= Gymnastics at the 2014 Asian Games – Women's rhythmic team =

Women's team at the 2014 Asian Games
- Venue: Namdong Gymnasium
- Date: 1 October 2014
- Competitors: 24 from 6 nations

Medalists
gold medal	Uzbekistan; Valeriya Davidova, Ravilya Farkhutdinova, Djamila Rakhmatova, Anastasiya Serdyukova
silver medal	South Korea; Gim Yun-hee, Lee Da-ae, Lee Na-kyung, Son Yeon-jae
bronze medal	Kazakhstan; Sabina Ashirbayeva, Aliya Assymova, Viktoriya Gorbunova, Yekaterina Skorikova

The women's rhythmic team competition at the 2014 Asian Games in Incheon, South Korea was held on 1 October 2014 at the Namdong Gymnasium.

== Schedule ==
All times are Korea Standard Time (UTC+09:00)

Date	Time	Event
Wednesday, 1 October 2014	14:00	Final

== Results ==
Rank	Team	Hoop (rhythmic gymnastics)	Ball (rhythmic gymnastics)	Clubs (rhythmic gymnastics)	Ribbon (rhythmic gymnastics)	Total
1st place, gold medalist(s)	Uzbekistan (UZB)	34.133	34.332	51.116	50.549	170.130
	Valeriya Davidova	~~15.150~~		16.783	16.733	
	Ravilya Farkhutdinova		~~13.533~~			
	Djamila Rakhmatova	17.150	17.166	17.050	16.933	
	Anastasiya Serdyukova	16.983	17.166	17.283	16.883	
2nd place, silver medalist(s)	South Korea (KOR)	47.733	33.049	48.865	34.399	164.046
	Gim Yun-hee	15.083	15.166	16.183	16.416	
	Lee Da-ae	14.800	~~14.450~~			
	Lee Na-kyung			14.666	~~14.300~~	
	Son Yeon-jae	17.850	17.883	18.016	17.983	
3rd place, bronze medalist(s)	Kazakhstan (KAZ)	48.965	32.750	49.016	32.400	163.131
	Sabina Ashirbayeva	16.566	16.250	16.800	16.500	
	Aliya Assymova	16.666	16.500	16.733	15.900	
	Viktoriya Gorbunova	15.733	~~15.050~~	15.483		
	Yekaterina Skorikova				~~15.350~~	
4	Japan (JPN)	49.082	49.016	48.349	16.383	162.830
	Sakura Hayakawa	17.166	17.150	16.466	~~14.750~~	
	Uzume Kawasaki	15.283			~~15.116~~	
	Maho Mikami		15.233	15.133		
	Kaho Minagawa	16.633	16.633	16.750	16.383	
5	China (CHN)	32.266	46.733	32.283	46.416	157.698
	Deng Senyue	17.633	17.550	17.700	17.300	
	Liu Jiahui	14.633	14.550	~~14.316~~	14.350	
	Ma Qianhui				14.766	
	Wang Yili	~~14.100~~	14.633	14.583		
6	Chinese Taipei (TPE)	39.065	38.900	27.433	26.066	131.464
	Hsu Tzu-chi	13.066	12.950	~~11.816~~		
	Ku Ni-chen	12.883	13.000	13.500	13.333	
	Kung Yun	13.116	12.950	13.933	12.733	
	Yang Chian-mei				~~11.450~~	
