= Gymnastics at the 2014 Asian Games – Women's rhythmic individual all-around =

Women's individual all-around at the 2014 Asian Games
- Venue: Namdong Gymnasium
- Date: 1–2 October 2014
- Competitors: 28 from 8 nations

Medalists
gold medal	Son Yeon-jae	South Korea
silver medal	Deng Senyue	China
bronze medal	Anastasiya Serdyukova	Uzbekistan

The women's rhythmic individual all-around competition at the 2014 Asian Games in Incheon, South Korea was held on 1 and 2 October 2014 at the Namdong Gymnasium.

== Schedule ==
All times are Korea Standard Time (UTC+09:00)

Date	Time	Event
Wednesday, 1 October 2014	14:00	Qualification
Thursday, 2 October 2014	18:00	Final

== Results ==
=== Qualification ===
Rank	Athlete	Hoop (rhythmic gymnastics)	Ball (rhythmic gymnastics)	Clubs (rhythmic gymnastics)	Ribbon (rhythmic gymnastics)	Total
1	Son Yeon-jae (KOR)	~~17.850~~	17.883	18.016	17.983	53.882
2	Deng Senyue (CHN)	17.633	17.550	17.700	~~17.300~~	52.883
3	Anastasiya Serdyukova (UZB)	16.983	17.166	17.283	~~16.883~~	51.432
4	Djamila Rakhmatova (UZB)	17.150	17.166	17.050	~~16.933~~	51.366
5	Sakura Hayakawa (JPN)	17.166	17.150	16.466	~~14.750~~	50.782
6	Kaho Minagawa (JPN)	16.633	16.633	16.750	~~16.383~~	50.016
7	Aliya Assymova (KAZ)	16.666	16.500	16.733	~~15.900~~	49.899
8	Sabina Ashirbayeva (KAZ)	16.566	~~16.250~~	16.800	16.500	49.866
9	Valeriya Davidova (UZB)	15.150		16.783	16.733	48.666
10	Gim Yun-hee (KOR)	~~15.083~~	15.166	16.183	16.416	47.765
11	Viktoriya Gorbunova (KAZ)	15.733	15.050	15.483		46.266
12	Liu Jiahui (CHN)	14.633	14.550	~~14.316~~	14.350	43.533
13	Wang Yili (CHN)	14.100	14.633	14.583		43.316
14	Kung Yun (TPE)	13.116	12.950	13.933	~~12.733~~	39.999
15	Ku Ni-chen (TPE)	~~12.883~~	13.000	13.500	13.333	39.833
16	Hsu Tzu-chi (TPE)	13.066	12.950	11.816		37.832
17	Saltanat Kiiazova (KGZ)	12.300	~~10.950~~	12.750	12.416	37.466
18	Panjarat Prawatyotin (THA)	11.900	~~11.733~~	12.183	12.600	36.683
19	Manatsanan Chaiteerapattarapong (THA)	11.333	~~11.266~~	11.850	11.300	34.483
20	Firuza Sadykova (KGZ)	11.166	10.066	10.450	~~10.000~~	31.682
	Ma Qianhui (CHN)				14.766	
	Uzume Kawasaki (JPN)	15.283			15.116	
	Maho Mikami (JPN)		15.233	15.133		
	Yekaterina Skorikova (KAZ)				15.350	
	Lee Da-ae (KOR)	14.800	14.450			
	Lee Na-kyung (KOR)			14.666	14.300	
	Yang Chian-mei (TPE)				11.450	
	Ravilya Farkhutdinova (UZB)		13.533			

=== Final ===
Rank	Athlete	Hoop (rhythmic gymnastics)	Ball (rhythmic gymnastics)	Clubs (rhythmic gymnastics)	Ribbon (rhythmic gymnastics)	Total
1st place, gold medalist(s)	Son Yeon-jae (KOR)	18.216	17.300	18.100	18.083	71.699
2nd place, silver medalist(s)	Deng Senyue (CHN)	17.583	17.400	17.866	17.483	70.332
3rd place, bronze medalist(s)	Anastasiya Serdyukova (UZB)	17.133	17.183	16.900	17.133	68.349
4	Djamila Rakhmatova (UZB)	17.050	17.133	17.116	16.500	67.799
5	Kaho Minagawa (JPN)	16.883	17.116	17.050	16.300	67.349
6	Sakura Hayakawa (JPN)	16.866	16.616	16.816	17.033	67.331
7	Sabina Ashirbayeva (KAZ)	16.666	16.216	16.383	16.200	65.465
8	Aliya Assymova (KAZ)	16.366	16.150	16.116	15.333	63.965
9	Gim Yun-hee (KOR)	16.300	16.450	15.516	15.400	63.666
10	Liu Jiahui (CHN)	15.583	15.166	15.266	15.850	61.865
11	Ku Ni-chen (TPE)	12.833	13.066	13.316	13.033	52.248
12	Kung Yun (TPE)	13.516	11.350	14.066	12.833	51.765
13	Panjarat Prawatyotin (THA)	11.950	12.283	12.000	12.466	48.699
14	Manatsanan Chaiteerapattarapong (THA)	11.800	11.466	11.583	11.950	46.799
15	Saltanat Kiiazova (KGZ)	11.600	9.700	12.866	12.066	46.232
16	Firuza Sadykova (KGZ)	10.033	10.216	11.416	9.866	41.531
