= Selina Zhumatayeva =

Khazakh rhythmic gymnast

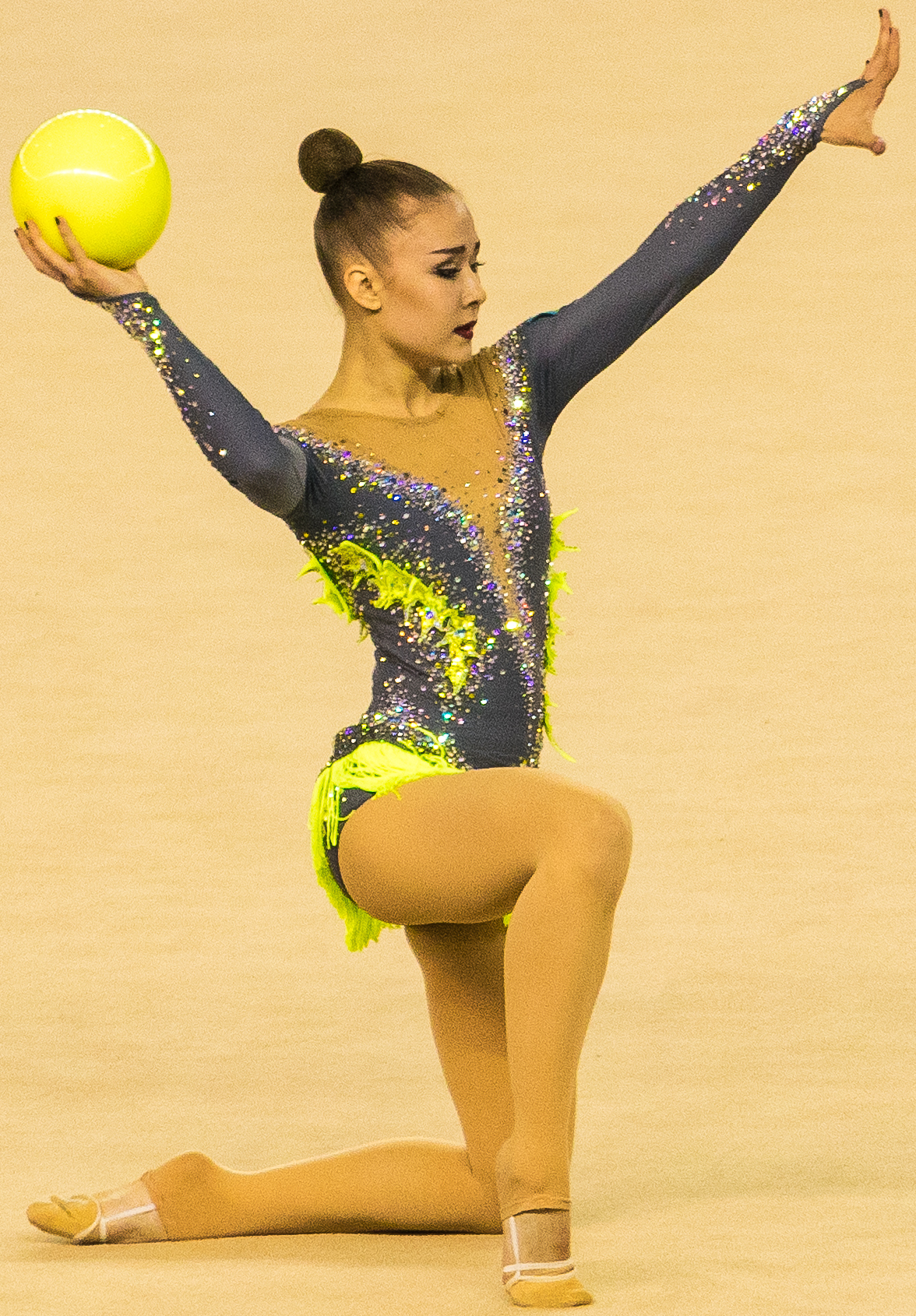

Personal information
- Born: 16 August 1998 (age 28) Tashkent, Uzbekistan

Gymnastics career
- Discipline: Rhythmic gymnastics
- Country represented: Kazakhstan; (2014-2018)
- Club: Zhuldyz School of Rhythmic Gymnastics
- Head coach: Ekaterina Panchenko
- Retired: yes
Medal record
Representing Kazakhstan
Rhythmic Gymnastics
Asian Championships
Silver medal – second place	2018 Kuala Lumpur	Team
Bronze medal – third place	2015 Jecheon	Team

Selina Zhumatayeva (born 16 August 1998) is a retired Kazakhstani rhythmic gymnast of Uzbekistan origin. She is a two time Asian Championships medalist.

== Career ==
Zhumatayeva began training in 2003 at age five in her native Tashkent.

In May 2014 she made her international debut for Kazakhstan at the World Cup in Tashkent, being 22nd in the All-Around, 24th with hoop, 17th with ball, 23rd with clubs and 21st with ribbon. In September she was selected for her maiden World Championships in Izmir, being 58th overall, 80th with hoop, 65th with ball, 44th with clubs and 19th in teams (along Aliya Assymova and Aidana Sarybay).

In 2015 she competed in the World Cup in Tashkent, finishing 17th in the All-Around, 16th with hoop, 15th with ball, 13th with clubs and 18th with ribbon. In June she took part in her first Asian Championships in Jecheon, winning bronze in teams along Sabina Ashirbayeva and Aliya Assymova. In August she participated in the World Cup stage in Budapest, taking 32nd place in the All-Around, 28th with hoop, 33rd with ball, 31st with clubs and 30th with ribbon. A month later she was selected for the World Championships in Stuttgart, competing with clubs and ribbon she was 46th and 43rd with the apparatuses and 13th in teams.

At the 2016 World Cup in Baku she was 22nd in the All-Around, 19th with hoop, 21st with ball, 23rd with clubs and 21st with ribbon.

In 2017 she took part in the World Cup in Tashkent, being 19th in the All-Around, 19th with hoop, 17th with ball, 18th with clubs and 19th with ribbon. In June she competed with ball and with clubs at the Asian Championships in Astana, being 6th with ball, 7th with clubs and won gold in teams along Alina Adilkhanova, Anna Afuxenidi and Sabina Ashirbayeva. In early August she took 23rd place overall, 32nd with hoop, 22nd with ball, 20th with clubs and 17th with ribbon at the World Cup in Minsk. Days later she competed in the University Games in Taipei, finishing 8th in the All-Around, 5th with ball and 7th with ribbon.

In April 2018 she participated in the World Cup in Pesaro, being 31st in the All-Around, 21st with hoop, 31st with ball, 28th with clubs and 40th with ribbon. In Tashkent she took 14th place overall, 18th with hoop, 15th with ball, 15th with clubs and 14th with ribbon. At the Asian Championships in Kuala Lumpur she won silver in teams along Alina Adilkhanova, Adilya Tlekenova and Aidana Sarybay.

In June 2019 she received a four-year suspension due to a doping test positive to furosemide in 2017. She then retired from the sport.
