= Kaho Minagawa =

Japanese rhythmic gymnast

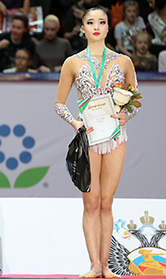

Personal information
- Full name: Kaho Minagawa
- Born: 20 August 1997 (age 29) Chiba, Japan
- Height: 170 cm (5 ft 7 in)

Gymnastics career
- Discipline: Rhythmic gymnastics
- Country represented: Japan; (2009–2021)
- College team: Kokushikan University
- Club: Aeon
- Gym: Novogorsk
- Head coach: Oka Kurumi
- Assistant coach: Nadezda Kholodkova
- Retired: 2021
- World ranking: 14 WC 13 WCC (2017 Season); 25 (2016 Season); 13 (2015 Season); 18 (2014 Season); 61 (2013 Season)
Medal record
Representing Japan
Rhythmic Gymnastics
World Championships
Bronze medal – third place	2017 Pesaro	Hoop
Asian Championships
Gold medal – first place	2017 Astana	Ball
Gold medal – first place	2017 Astana	Hoop
Silver medal – second place	2016 Tashkent	Ball
Silver medal – second place	2017 Astana	All-around
Silver medal – second place	2017 Astana	Team
Bronze medal – third place	2015 Jecheon	Clubs
Bronze medal – third place	2015 Jecheon	Ribbon
Bronze medal – third place	2017 Astana	Clubs

Kaho Minagawa (Japanese: 皆川夏穂; born 20 August 1997) is a retired Japanese individual rhythmic gymnast. She is the 2017 Asian Championships All-around silver medalist. She trained in Novogorsk in Moscow, Russia. She is the first Japanese individual rhythmic gymnast to win a medal at the World Cup series.

== Career ==
Minagawa appeared in international junior competitions in 2010. She won silver in all-around at the World Club Cup, the 2011 Aeon Cup in Tokyo, Japan.

Minagawa appeared in Senior competitions in the 2013 Season, she competed in the Grand Prix and World Cup Rhythmic Gymnastics Series. On June 5–08, Minagawa competed with Japanese Team at the 2013 Asian Championships. At the 2013 World Cup Final in St.Petersburg, she placed 23rd in the all-around qualifications. Minagawa then competed at the 2013 World Championships in Kyiv, Ukraine finishing 36th in the qualifications, she did not advance into the finals.

In 2014, Minagawa started her season competing at the 2014 Grand Prix Moscow where she finished 9th in all-around (tied with Georgia's Salome Phajava) and qualified to 4 event finals for the first time in the Grand Prix finishing 7th in hoop, ball and 8th clubs, ribbon. At the 2014 Lisboa World Cup she had her highest placement finishing 11th in All-around finals. On May 9–11, Minagawa competed at the 2014 Corbeil-Essonnes World Cup and finished 20th in all-around. She then competed at the 2014 Tashkent World Cup and finished 8th in clubs and 6th in ribbon final. She finished 24th in all-around at the 2014 Minsk World Cup. At the 2014 World Cup Final in Kazan, Russia, Minagawa finished 14th in all-around behind American gymnast Jasmine Kerber. On September 22–28, Minagawa competed at the 2014 World Championships in İzmir, Turkey where she qualified for the all-around finals finishing in 23rd position ahead of Canada's Patricia Bezzoubenko. She then competed at the 2014 Asian Games and finished 5th in all-around ahead of teammate Sakura Hayakawa. On October 17–19, Minagawa competed in Tokyo for the 2014 Aeon Cup, where she finished 10th in the All-around finals behind Ukraine's Eleonora Romanova.

In 2015, Minagawa competed at the senior international division at the Moscow Grand Prix and won the all-around silver medal. On March 27–29, Minagawa competed at the 2015 Lisboa World Cup finishing 8th in the all-around ahead of Victoria Veinberg Filanovsky, she qualified to 3 event finals (hoop, ball, and ribbon). she then competed at the 2015 Bucharest World Cup and finished 11th in the all-around. On April 10–12, Hayakawa finished 14th in the all-around behind Neta Rivkin at the 2015 Pesaro World Cup. Nazarenkova finished 6th in all-around at the 2015 Asian Championships, she qualified to 3 apparatus finals: she won bronze in clubs, ribbon and finished 4th in hoop. In August, Minagawa competed at the 2015 Budapest World Cup, finishing 13th in all-around ahead of Israeli Neta Rivkin. At the 2015 World Cup Final in Kazan, Minagawa finished 15th in the all-around. On September 9–13, Minagawa (together with teammates Sakura Hayakawa and Uzume Kawasaki) competed at the 2015 World Championships in Stuttgart were Team Japan finished 6th. Minagawa qualified in the All-around finals finishing in 15th place with a total of 69.399 points. On October 2–4, Minagawa together with teammates Sakura Hayakawa and junior Ruriko Shibayama represented Aeon at the 2015 Aeon Cup in Tokyo Japan, Minagawa finished 11th in the all-around finals with a total of 68.248points and with Team Japan finishing 4th in the overall standings.

In 2016, Minagawa started her season competing at the 2016 Grand Prix Moscow finishing 11th in the all-around. On February 26–28, she competed at the 2016 Espoo World Cup finishing 15th in the all-around and qualified to ball final. On April 1–3, Minagawa competed at the 2016 Pesaro World Cup where she finished 22nd in the all-around, she qualified to ball and ribbon final. On May 8–10, Minagawa finished 4th in the all-around with a total of 69.950 points at the 2016 Asian Championships ahead of China's Shang Rong. On June 3–5, Minagawa then finished 7th in the all-around with a total of 71.350 points at the 2016 Guadalajara World Cup and qualified to ball final. On July 1–3, Minagawa competed at the 2016 Berlin World Cup finishing 12th in the all-around and qualified to the ribbon final. On July 8–10, Minagawa then finished 17th in the all-around at the 2016 Kazan World Cup. On August 19–20, Minagawa competed at the 2016 Summer Olympics held in Rio de Janeiro, Brazil. She finished 16th in the rhythmic gymnastics individual all-around qualifications and did not advance into the top 10 finals.

In 2017, On April 7–9, Minagawa competed at the 2017 Pesaro World Cup finishing 22nd in the all-around and qualified to 1 apparatus final in hoop. She then competed at the 2017 Tashkent World Cup finishing 7th in the all-around behind Katsiaryna Halkina, Minagawa qualified 2 apparatus final placing 5th in hoop and 4th in ball. On May 5–7, Minagawa competed at the 2017 Sofia World Cup finishing 18th in the all-around and qualified in apparatus finals in hoop and ball. Minagawa's next event was at the 2017 World Challenge Cup Guadalajara where she finished 6th in the all-around, she qualified in 2 apparatus finals and won bronze in hoop – her first World Cup medal and Japan's first individual World Cup medal, she finished 8th in ribbon. Minagawa competed at the quadrennial held 2017 World Games in Wrocław, Poland from July 20–30, she qualified in 2 apparatus finals finishing 6th in hoop and 5th in ribbon. On August 11–13, Minagawa competed at the 2017 Kazan World Challenge Cup finishing 7th in the all-around, she qualified in 2 apparatus finals and finished 4th in ball, 6th in hoop. On August 30, Minagawa won a bronze medal in hoop at the 2017 World Championships in Pesaro, becoming the first Japanese medalist in a world championship individual event in 42 years since Mitsuru Hiraguchi won a gold medal in the individual hoop final at the 1975 World Championships in Madrid, Spain. Minagawa finished 5th in the all-around final equaling Yoko Morino who also finished 5th in all-around at the 1975 Worlds, although the competition was not attended by rhythmic powerhouses Bulgaria, East Germany, and the Soviet Union.

In 2018 season, on March 30-April 1, Minagawa began the world cup events competing at the 2018 Sofia World Cup finishing 10th in the all-around, she qualified in ball final finishing in 7th. on April 13–15, Minagawa competed at the 2018 Pesaro World Cup finishing 10th in the all-around, she then qualified in the hoop final. On April 27–29, Minagawa participated at the 2018 Baku World Cup where she won finished 7th in the all-around, she qualified in 1 apparatus final and won bronze medal in ball. On May 11–13, Kaho then competed at the 2018 Portimão World Challenge Cup finishing 5th in the all-around, she qualified in 3 apparatus finals where she won silver in ribbon behind Maria Sergeeva of Russia, she finished 8th with hoop and ball.

Kaho has not been chosen to represent Japan at the Olympic Games in Tokyo, after being beaten by her two younger teammates Sumire Kita and Chisaki Oiwa. Kaho was selected to compete 2021 World Championships in Kitakyushu, Japan with ribbon : she finished in 15th place and didn't qualify to the final. She retired from the sport after the competition.

== Routine music information ==
Year	Apparatus	Music title
2019	Hoop	View of Silence by Joe Hisaishi
2019	Ball	Never Enough by Loren Allred
2019	Clubs	Macavity The Mystery Cat by Sarah Brightman
2019	Ribbon	Pas de Deux from The Nutcracker by Tchaikovsky
2018	Hoop	Rhapsody on a Theme of Paganini Op.4 by Sergei Rachmaninoff
2018	Ball	Le Temps Des Cathédrales by Josh Groban
2018	Clubs	Macavity The Mystery Cat by Sarah Brightman
2018	Ribbon	Pas de Deux from The Nutcracker by Tchaikovsky
2017	Hoop	All By Myself by Larry Dalton
2017	Ball	Le Temps des cathédrales by Josh Groban
2017	Clubs	Love Is a Gift by Kentucky Thunder
2017	Ribbon	A Dream by Charles Gerhardt, Christian Steiner, RCA Symphony Orchestra
2016	Hoop	All By Myself by Larry Dalton
2016	Ball	I Will Always Love You (jazz version)
2016	Clubs	Cabaret Sata by Cirque du Soleil
2016	Ribbon	7 Beauties, Ballet Suite: I.Waltz by Royal Philharmonic Orchestra
2015	Hoop	Overture, Requiem (The Fifth), Fate by Trans-Siberian Orchestra
2015	Ball	I Will Always Love You (jazz version)
2015	Clubs	Swing, Brother Swing by Billie Holiday
2015	Ribbon	7 Beauties, Ballet Suite: I.Waltz by Royal Philharmonic Orchestra
2014	Hoop	Overture / Requiem (The Fifth) / Fate by Trans-Siberian Orchestra
2014	Ball	Tango by Sultan Ali
2014	Clubs	La Danse Nouvelle/Jeanne Avril /Bruant music from Formidable by Grand Orchestre du Moulin Rouge
2014	Ribbon	Son Isik by Bilen Yildirir
2013	Hoop	Flamenco by Didulya
2013	Ball	Tango / Resurgence by Sultan Ali
2013	Clubs	La Danse Nouvelle/Jeanne Avril /Bruant music from Formidable by Grand Orchestre du Moulin Rouge
2013	Ribbon	Piano Sonata No.17 “Tempest” in D minor, Op.31 No.2 III Movement : Allegretto by Ludwig van Beethoven
