= Sabina Ashirbayeva =

Kazakhstani rhythmic gymnast

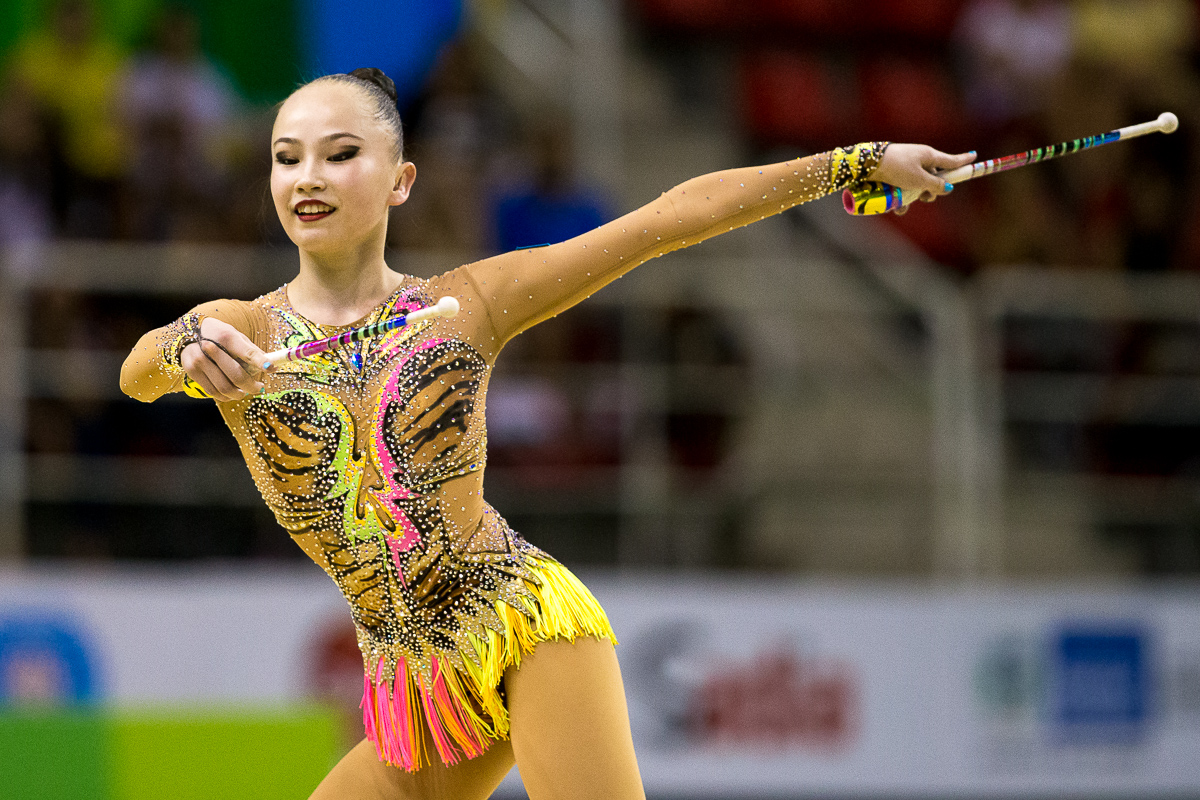
- Ashirbayeva performing with the clubs at the 2016 Gymnastics Olympic Test Event

Personal information
- Born: November 5, 1998 (age 27) Shymkent, Kazakhstan
- Height: 163 cm (5 ft 4 in)

Gymnastics career
- Discipline: Rhythmic gymnastics
- Country represented: Kazakhstan; (2010–2018)
- Club: Aliya Yusupova School
- Head coach: Aliya Yussupova
- World ranking: 14 WC 5 WCC (2017 Season); 18 (2016 Season); 34 (2015 Season); 45 (2014 Season)
Medal record
Representing Kazakhstan
Rhythmic Gymnastics
Asian Games
Bronze medal – third place	2014 Incheon	Team
Asian Championships
Disqualified	2017 Astana	Hoop
Disqualified	2017 Astana	Ball
Disqualified	2017 Astana	Team
Silver medal – second place	2016 Tashkent	Hoop
Silver medal – second place	2016 Tashkent	Ribbon
Bronze medal – third place	2016 Tashkent	All-around
Bronze medal – third place	2016 Tashkent	Clubs
Bronze medal – third place	2015 Jecheon	Team
Bronze medal – third place	2015 Jecheon	Clubs
Bronze medal – third place	2015 Jecheon	Ball

Sabina Ashirbayeva (Kazakh: Сабина Әшірбаева, Sabina Äşırbaeva; Russian: Сабина Аширбаева, born November 5, 1998) is a retired individual Kazakh rhythmic gymnast. She is the 2016 Asian Championships All-around bronze medalist.

== Personal life ==
Ashirbayeva speaks Kazakh and Russian. Her idols in rhythmic gymnastics are Yana Kudryavtseva and Yanina Batyrchina. She holds the title of Master of Sport of International Class in Kazakhstan.

== Career ==
=== Junior ===
Ashirbayeva has won junior competitions in Kazakhstan for ages 1998–1999, she trains at the Aliya Yusupova School in Shymkent. Her coach, Yussupova was a competitive elite rhythmic gymnast who has placed 4th at the 2004 Olympics and 5th at the 2008 Olympics. Ashirbayeva began appearing in junior international competitions in 2010. In 2012, she competed at the 2012 Moscow Junior Grand Prix and Schmiden International.

In 2013, Ashirbayeva was again at the 2013 Moscow Junior Grand Prix. At the 2013 Valentine Junior World Cup, Ashirbayeva won silver in clubs, bronze medals in hoop, ball and ribbon. She finished 4th in all-around at the 2013 Holon Junior Grand Prix.

=== Senior ===
In 2014 Season, Ashirbayeva began competing in senior tournaments appearing at the 2014 Holon Grand Prix, she finished 4th in the all-around. She also competed at the FIG World Cup Series, finishing 19th in the all-around in Pesaro, 27th in Sofia and at the 2014 World Cup Final in Kazan, she finished 27th in the all-around. She was member of the Kazakh team that won team bronze at the 2014 Asian Games and finished 7th in the all-around finals behind Japan's Sakura Hayakawa.

In 2015, Ashirbayeva started her season at the 2015 Moscow Grand Prix, competing in the international tournament division finishing 5th in all-around behind Israel's Linoy Ashram. She won the all-around gold at the 2015 Zhuldyz Cup in Astana. At the 2015 Lisboa World Cup, she finished 17th in the all-around. Ashirbayeva won 2 bronze medals (hoop, clubs) at the 2015 Asian Championships in Jecheon, South Korea. in August, at the 2015 World Cup Final in Kazan, Ashirbayeva finished 17th in all-around with a total of 67.550 points. On September 9–13, Ashirbayeva competed in her first Worlds at the 2015 World Championships where she qualified to the all-around finals finishing in 18th place with a total score of 68.931 points.

In 2016, Ashirbayeva kept all her routines from 2015; she began her season competing at the 2016 Gracia Cup in Budapest and finished 9th in the all-around, she qualified to 1 event finals and finished 7th in ribbon. On February 17–22, she competed at the 2016 Grand Prix Moscow finishing 20th in the all-around and qualified to ribbon final. On February 26–28, she competed at the 2016 Espoo World Cup finishing 11th in the all-around with a total of 69.300, she qualified to ribbon final. On March 17–20, Ashirbayeva then competed at the 2016 Lisboa World Cup where she finished 10th in the all-around with a total of 69.700 and qualified to ball, ribbon finals. On April 1–3, she competed at the 2016 Pesaro World Cup where she finished 12th in the all-around with a total of 70.250 points. On April 21–22, Ashirbayeva won an Olympics license by finishing first amongst a top 8 selection of highest score for non qualified gymnasts at the 2016 Gymnastics Olympic Test Event held in Rio de Janeiro. Ashirbayeva won the all-around bronze medal at the 2016 Asian Championships in Tashkent with a total of 70.500 points. On July 1–3, Ashirbayeva competed at the 2016 Berlin World Cup finishing 8th in the all-around with a total of 70.250 points, she qualified for the hoop, ball and clubs final. On July 8–10, Ashirbayeva then finished 13th in the all-around at the 2016 Kazan World Cup with a total of 70.250 points. On July 22–24, culminating the World Cup of the season in 2016 Baku World Cup, Ashirbayeva finished 16th in the all-around. On August 19–20, Ashirbayeva competed at the 2016 Summer Olympics held in Rio de Janeiro, Brazil. She finished 12th in the rhythmic gymnastics individual all-around qualifications and did not advance into the top 10 finals.

In 2017, Ashirbayeva started the post-Olympics season competing at the Miss Valentine Cup, finishing 6th in the all-around. She then competed at the 2017 Grand Prix Moscow finishing 11th in the all-around and qualified to the hoop final. On March 31 – April 2, Ashirbayeva competed at the 2017 Grand Prix Marbella finishing 19th in the all-around and qualified to 1 apparatus final. On April 7–9, Ashirbayeva competed at the 2017 Pesaro World Cup finishing 9th in the all-around and qualified to 1 apparatus final in clubs. She then competed at the 2017 Tashkent World Cup finishing 11th in the all-around. Ashirbayeva's next event was at the 2017 World Challenge Cup Guadalajara where she finished 4th in the all-around behind Alina Harnasko, she qualified in all 4 apparatus finals. On June 24–27, Ashirbayeva competed at the 2017 Asian Championships where she finished a disappointing 5th place in the all-around behind Japan's Sumire Kita. However, Ashirbayeva qualified to all apparatus finals and took gold in hoop, ball, finished 5th in clubs and 6th in ribbon. Ashirbayeva along with the Kazakh Team also won gold in Team event. On July 7–9, Ashirbayeva finished 5th in the all-around at the 2017 Berlin World Challenge Cup, she qualified in all apparatus final and won a silver in ball, finished 5th in hoop, 6th in clubs, 7th in ribbon. On August 11–13, Ashirbayeva competed at the 2017 Kazan World Challenge Cup finishing 12th in the all-around, she qualified in ribbon final and finished in 8th place. On August 30 – September 3, at the 2017 World Championships in Pesaro, Italy; Ashirbayeva finished 16th in the all-around final, she did not advance into any apparatus finals.

Ashirbayeva tested positive for the prohibited substances furosemide, hydrochlorothiazide and chlorothiazide at four competitions between April and June 2017. Consequently, she was banned from competition for two years, beginning June 7, 2018. Her results in competitions from April 1 to June 30, 2017, including her results from the Asian Championships, were disqualified. Ashirbayeva's appeal to the Court of Arbitration for Sport (CAS) was dismissed on 6 March 2019.

In 2018, Ashirbayeva announced retirement in her career from competitive rhythmic gymnastics.

== Gymnastic skills ==
Ashirbayeva has executed a quadruple penchee turn and a triple Kanaeva ring pivot.

== Routine music information ==
Year	Apparatus	Music title
2017	Hoop	Arise by E. S. Posthumus
2017	Ball	Cry Me a River music from Justin Timberlake by Eklipse
2017	Clubs	Me Too by Meghan Trainor
2017	Ribbon	The Mirror by Alexandre Desplat
2016	Hoop	Tango Kumparsita by DJ Valer
2016	Ball	Scheherazade: Young Prince And Princess by Nikolai Rimsky-Korsakov
2016	Clubs	Latin Mix by Alessandro Olivato
2016	Ribbon	Monster Bossa music from Doctor Who by Murray Gold,
2015	Hoop	Tango Kumparsita by DJ Valer
2015	Ball	Scheherazade: Young Prince And Princess by Nikolai Rimsky-Korsakov
2015	Clubs	Latin Mix by Alessandro Olivato
2015	Ribbon	Monster Bossa music from Doctor Who by Murray Gold,
2014	Hoop	La danza by Mantovani
2014	Ball	My Way by André Rieu
2014	Clubs	That Man by Caro Emerald
2014	Ribbon	Lela Lela by Reg Project
2013	Hoop	Differente by Gotan Project
2013	Ball	Собирая Желтые Листья (Collect Yellow Leaves) by Andrei Dani
2013	Clubs	?
2013	Ribbon	Perhaps, Perhaps, Perhaps by Mantovani
