= Lee Da-ae =

South Korean rhythmic gymnast (born 1991)

- 이다애
- Born: 23 December 1994 (age 31) Gimpo, South Korea
- Height: 160 cm (5 ft 3 in)

Gymnastics career
- Discipline: Rhythmic gymnastics
- Country represented: South Korea (2011–2016)
- Club: Sejong University
- Head coach: Song Hee
- Retired: yes
Medal record
Representing South Korea
Asian Championships
Silver medal – second place	2013 Tashkent	Team
Silver medal – second place	2015 Jecheon	Team
Asian Games
Silver medal – second place	2014 Incheon	Team

Lee Da-ae (Korean: 이다애; born 23 December 1994) is a South Korean retired rhythmic gymnast. She represented her country in international competitions.

== Biography ==
Da-ae began rhythmic gymnastics in her third year of primary school after participating in an extracurricular activity. In 2011 she competed in the World Championships in Montpellier as part of the Korean senior group along Choi Hyeon-hee, Kim Hye-jin, Lee Kyung-un and Seol Hee-moon. There they took 21st place in the All-Around.

In 2013 she won team silver along Chun Song E, Gim Yun-hee and Son Yeon-Jae, at the Asian Championships in Tashkent. In early September 2014 she took part in the World Cup in Kazan, being 37th overall. She then participated in the 2014 World Championships in Izmir, finishing 95th with hoop, 89th with ball and 10th in teams. Shortly later she won team silver with Gim Yun-hee, Lee Nakyung and Son Yeon-jae at the 2014 Asian Games in Incheon.

In June 2015 she competed in the Asian Championships in Jecheon, winning silver in teams along Cheon Song-Yi and Son Yeon-Jae, also being 8th with ribbon. At the Universiade in Gwangju, ending 14th overall and 8th with clubs. In August she took 39th place in the All-Around, 35th with hoop, 35th with ball, 33rd with clubs and 42nd with ribbon at the World Cup in Budapest. A month later she was selected for the World Championships in Stuttgart, 75th with clubs, 78th with ribbon and 12th in teams along Chun Song E and Son Yeon-jae.

In 2016 Lee was ranked third in the internal competition to decide which gymnast would compete in the Olympic Games. In May she took 10th place in the Asian Championships, weeks later she was 17th in the All-Around, 18th with hoop, 19th with ball, 16th with clubs and 18th with ribbon at the World Cup in Tashkent. She retired shortly after sue to injury in her ankles, particularly a damaged left ankle ligament, that had been troubled her all her career.
