= Anastasiya Serdyukova =

Uzbekistani rhythmic gymnast

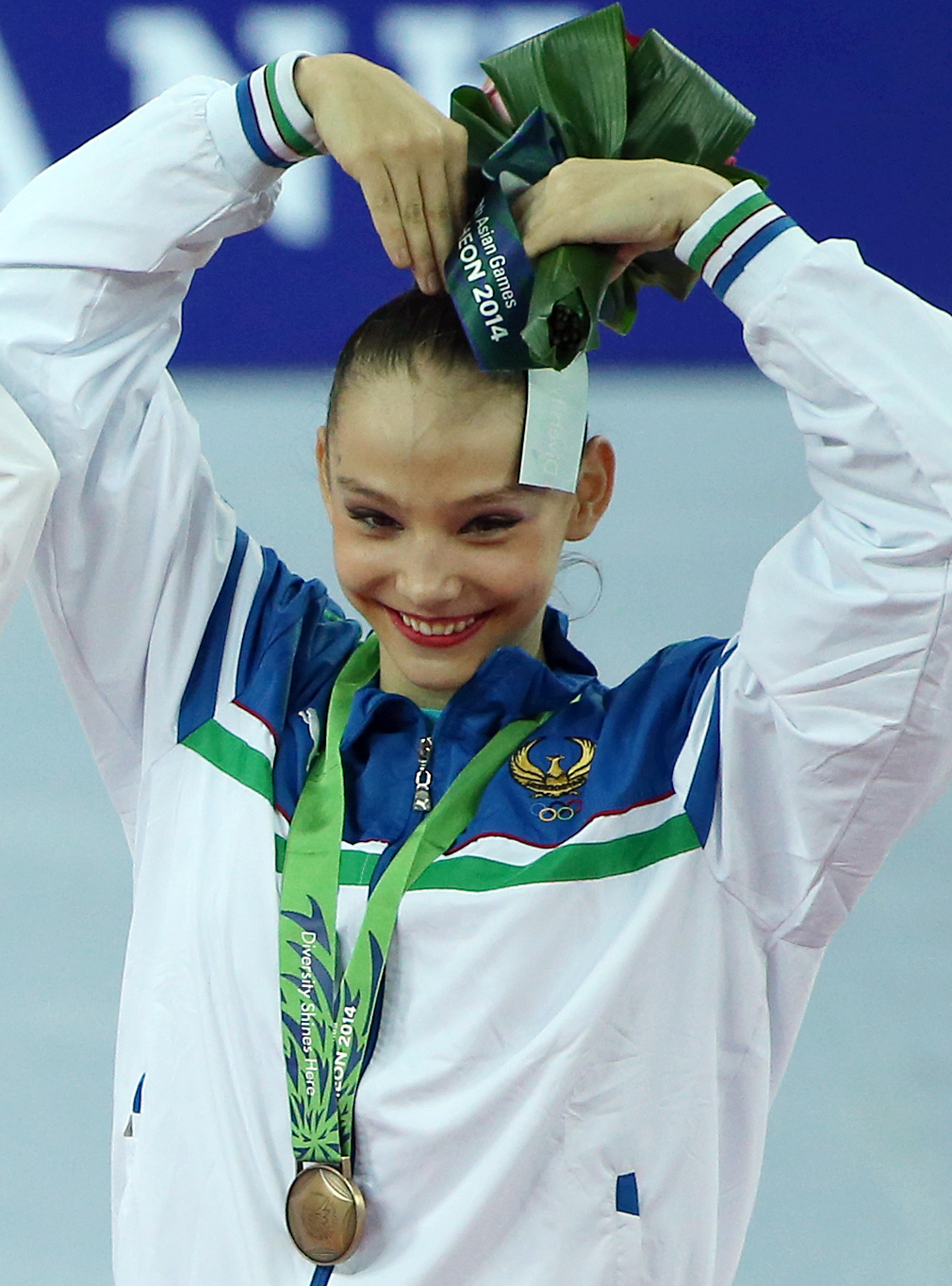

Personal information
- Full name: Anastasiya Evgenievna Serdyukova
- Nickname: Nastya
- Born: 29 May 1997 (age 29) Tashkent
- Height: 170 cm (5 ft 7 in)

Gymnastics career
- Discipline: Rhythmic gymnastics
- Country represented: Uzbekistan (2008)
- Club: Ruvshsm
- Head coach: Sevara Karimova
- Choreographer: Ildar Kolesyanov
- World ranking: 13 WC 17 WCC (2017 Season); 24 (2016 Season)); 18 (2015 Season); 57 (2013 Season)
Medal record
Representing Uzbekistan
Rhythmic Gymnastics
Asian Games
Gold medal – first place	2014 Incheon	Team
Bronze medal – third place	2014 Incheon	All-around
Grand Prix Final
Gold medal – first place	2015 Brno	Ribbon
Silver medal – second place	2015 Brno	Clubs
Bronze medal – third place	2015 Brno	Ball
Bronze medal – third place	2015 Brno	Hoop
Asian Championships
Gold medal – first place	2014 Incheon	Team
Gold medal – first place	2015 Jecheon	Team
Gold medal – first place	2017 Astana	All-around
Gold medal – first place	2017 Astana	Clubs
Gold medal – first place	2017 Astana	Ribbon
Gold medal – first place	2017 Astana	Team
Silver medal – second place	2015 Jecheon	Hoop
Silver medal – second place	2015 Jecheon	Ribbon
Bronze medal – third place	2014 Incheon	All-around
Bronze medal – third place	2017 Astana	Ball
Islamic Solidarity Games
Gold medal – first place	2017 Baku	Clubs
Silver medal – second place	2017 Baku	Team
Silver medal – second place	2017 Baku	Hoop
Silver medal – second place	2017 Baku	Ball

Anastasiya Evgenievna Serdyukova (Russian: Анастасия Евгеньевна Сердюкова; born 29 May 1997) is an Uzbekistani former individual rhythmic gymnast. She is the All-around bronze medalist at the 2014 Asian Games and the 2017 Asian Championships All-around gold medalist.

== Personal life ==
Serdyukova's favorite athletes and gymnastic idols are Alina Kabaeva and Uzbek Ulyana Trofimova. She is ethnic Russian.

== Career ==
Serdyukova started training gymnastics in 2000 through the encouragement of her sister in her hometown in Tashkent, she appeared in international junior competitions in 2009. She competed in the Junior World Cup series. She won silver in the junior all-around at the 2011 Tashkent World Cup. She began competing in the senior division in 2013.

Serdyukova competed at the 2013 World Championships in Kyiv, Ukraine and finished 53rd in all-around qualifications. In 2014, she competed at the 2014 World Cup series in Stuttgart, Germany finishing 19th in all-around. From 22 to 28 September Serdyukova, (along with teammates Elizaveta Nazarenkova and Djamila Rakhmatova), competed at the 2014 World Championships, where Team Uzbekistan took 8th place. She then competed at the 2014 Asian Games in Incheon, Korea where Team Uzbekistan won gold and she took the bronze medal in the individual all-around finals beating compatriot Djamila Rakhmatova.

In 2015 season, Serdyukova competed at the 2015 Baltic Hoop finishing 4th in all-around and won bronze in ball finals. Her next competition was in the Senior International tournament at the 2015 Moscow Grand Prix where she won the all-around bronze. Serdyukova competed at the 2015 Bucharest World Cup finishing 15th in all-around. On 10–12 April Hayakawa finished 12th in the all-around at the 2015 Pesaro World Cup. On 22–24 May Serdyukova competed at the 2015 Tashkent World Cup finishing 9th in the all-around with a total of 68.400 points. She qualified to 3 apparatus finals: she won bronze in clubs. Serdyukova finished 4th in all-around at the 2015 Asian Championships behind Japanese gymnast Sakura Hayakawa, in apparatus finals, she won silver in hoop, ribbon, placed 4th in ball and 6th in clubs. In August, Serdyukova finished 17th in all-around at the 2015 Budapest World Cup. At the 2015 World Cup Final in Kazan, Serdyukova finished 19th in the all-around. On 9–13 September Serdyukova (together with teammates Elizaveta Nazarenkova and Anora Davlyatova) competed at the 2015 World Championships in Stuttgart where Team Uzbekistan finished 8th. Serdyukova finished 28th in all-around qualifications and did not advance into the Top 24 all-around finals. On 16–18 October Serdyukova competed at the 2015 Grand Prix Final in Brno, where she finished 4th in the all-around with a total of 68.250 points. She qualified to all apparatus finals taking bronze in hoop, ball and in the last two apparatus, due to Margarita Mamun's withdrawal in the last 2 events, Serdyukova won gold in ribbon and silver in clubs behind Linoy Ashram.

In 2016, Serdyukova began her season competing at the 2016 Grand Prix Moscow finishing 10th in the all-around and qualified to ball finals. On 26–28 February she competed at the 2016 Espoo World Cup finishing 8th in the all-around with a total of 69.900 points. At the 30th Thiais Grand Prix event in Paris, she finished 12th in the all-around with a total of 69.700. On 1–3 April Serdyukova competed at the 2016 Pesaro World Cup where she finished 26th in the all-around. On 21–22 April Serdyukova won an Olympics license by finishing fifth amongst a top 8 selection of highest score for non qualified gymnasts at the 2016 Gymnastics Olympic Test Event held in Rio de Janeiro. On 13–15 May Serdyukova competed at the 2016 Tashkent World Cup finishing 6th in the all-around. On 13–15 May Serdyukova competed at the 2016 Tashkent World Cup finishing 6th in the all-around with a total of 70.100 points, she qualified to 3 apparatus finals: winning 2 bronze in ribbon, ball (tied with Linoy Ashram) and 5th in hoop. On 8–10 July Serdyukova then finished 15th in the all-around at the 2016 Kazan World Cup.

On 19–20 August Serdyukova competed at the 2016 Summer Olympics held in Rio de Janeiro, Brazil. She finished 17th in the rhythmic gymnastics individual all-around qualifications and did not advance into the top 10 finals.

In 2017, Serdyukova started her Post Olympics season competing at the Thiais Grand Prix where she finished 17th in the all-around after multiple drops in her apparatus. Her next competition was at the 2017 Tashkent World Cup where she finished 5th in the all-around and qualified to 3 apparatus finals taking bronze in ribbon, placed 4th in clubs and 5th in ball. At the 2017 Baku World Cup, Serdyukova finished 11th in the all-around and qualified to the clubs final. On 5–7 May Serdyukova competed at the 2017 Sofia World Cup finishing 9th in the all-around behind Eleni Kelaiditi, she qualified in 1 apparatus final in ball. Serdyukova's next event was at the 2017 World Challenge Cup Guadalajara where she finished 5th in the all-around behind Sabina Ashirbayeva, she qualified in 3 apparatus finals: taking 2 silver medals in clubs, ribbon and finished 6th in hoop. On 24–27 June Serdyukova competed at the 2017 Asian Championships and won gold in the all-around, she also won silver in team event. She won 2 gold medals in the apparatus finals in clubs and ribbon and finished 4th in ball. Serdyukova competed at the quadrennial held 2017 World Games in Wrocław, Poland from 20 to 30 July however she did not advance to any of the apparatus finals. On 5–7 August Serdyukova finished 11th in the all-around behind Japan's Sumire Kita at the 2017 Minsk World Challenge Cup, she advanced to 1 apparatus final finishing in 7th place. On 30 August - 3 September, at the 2017 World Championships in Pesaro, Italy, Serdyukova finished 18th in the all-around finals.

== Achievements ==
- First Uzbek gymnast to win a gold medal at the Grand Prix Final

First Uzbek gymnast to win a gold medal at the Asian Championship individual All around rhythmic gymnastics

== Routine music information ==
Year	Apparatus	Music title
2017	Hoop	Barigal by Nasiba Abdullayeva (Uzbek music)
2017	Ball	Spartacus, Act I, Scene I "The Triumph of Rome" by Rafael Baghdasaryan, Algis Zhuraitis, USSR State Symphony Orchestra
2017	Clubs	We Go On Snoopy, Elevator Chase by Christophe Beck
2017	Ribbon	Confessa by Adriano Celentano
2016	Hoop	Boat Chase, Bull Run by John Powell
2016	Ball	Sway by Rosemary Clooney
2016	Clubs	Ring Ring Ring by Kurd Maverick & RuDee
2016	Ribbon	Vokaliz by Brilliant Dadashova
2015	Hoop	Criminal by Gotan Project
2015	Ball	Is It Right by Elaiza
2015	Clubs	Ring Ring Ring by Kurd Maverick & RuDee
2015	Ribbon	Vokaliz by Brilliant Dadashova
2015	Gala	Bust In Windows by Jazmine Sullivan
2014	Hoop	Look at Me by Geri Halliwell
2014	Ball	Game On music from Madagascar 3 by Hans Zimmer
2014	Clubs	Gold Rush By Christophe Beck
2014	Ribbon	Horizon Part I, Hey Pachuco, My Humps by Safri Duo, DJ Ruslan Nigmatullin, Black Eyed Peas
