= Sakura Hayakawa =

Japanese rhythmic gymnast

- Born: 17 March 1997 (age 29) Osaka, Japan
- Height: 171 cm (5 ft 7 in)

Gymnastics career
- Discipline: Rhythmic gymnastics
- Country represented: Japan; (2009–present)
- Club: Aeon
- Head coach: Oka Kurumi
- Assistant coaches: Elena Nefedova, Haruyo Amano
- Eponymous skills: Sakura: Penché: body bent at the horizontal or below, rotation on flat foot with ring
- World ranking: 27 (2016 Season); 19 (2015 Season); 22 (2014 Season); 52 (2013 Season)
Medal record
Rhythmic gymnastics
Representing Japan
Asian Championships
Gold medal – first place	2015 Jecheon	Ribbon
Silver medal – second place	2015 Jecheon	Clubs
Bronze medal – third place	2015 Jecheon	All-around
Bronze medal – third place	2015 Jecheon	Hoop

Sakura Hayakawa (早川さくら, Hayakawa Sakura; born 17 March 1997 in Osaka, Japan) is a Japanese former individual rhythmic gymnast. She is the 2015 Asian Championships all-around bronze medalist. After retiring, she has worked as a coach.

== Career ==
Hayakawa appeared in international junior competitions in 2010. Hayakawa has competed at the World Club Cup, the Aeon Cup in Tokyo, Japan. She has also competed in the Grand Prix and World Cup series.

Hayakawa appeared in Senior competitions in the 2013 season. She competed in the Grand Prix and World Cup Rhythmic Gymnastics Series. On 5–8 June, Hayakawa competed with the Japanese Team at the 2013 Asian Championships. At the 2013 World Cup Final in Saint Petersburg, she placed 16th in the all-around ahead of American Jasmine Kerber. Hayakawa then competed at the 2013 World Championships in Kyiv, Ukraine finishing 40th in the qualifications. She did not advance into the finals.

In 2014, Hayakawa competed in the 2014 Grand and 2014 World Cup series. Her highest placement was 14th in all-around at the 2014 World Cup in Pesaro. Italy. On 22–28 September, Hayakawa competed at the 2014 World Championships in İzmir, Turkey, where she qualified for the all-around finals after finishing in 16th position behind Elizaveta Nazarenkova of Uzbekistan. She then competed at the 2014 Asian Games and finished 6th in all-around behind of teammate Kaho Minagawa. On 17–19 October, Hayakawa competed in Tokyo at the 2014 Aeon Cup, where she finished 7th in the all-around finals.

In 2015, Hayakawa began the season competing at the 2015 Moscow Grand Prix, finishing 12th in the all-around and qualifying to three event finals. On 27–29 March, Hayakawa competed at the 2015 Lisbon World Cup, where she was 20th in the all-around and qualified to one event final. She then competed at the 2015 Bucharest World Cup and finished 9th in the all-around behind Nazarenkova. On 10–12 April, Hayakawa finished 21st in the all-around at the 2015 Pesaro World Cup. On 22–24 May, Hayakawa competed at the 2015 Tashkent World Cup, finishing 12th in the all-around.

Hayakawa won the all-around bronze at the 2015 Asian Championships behind Uzbek gymnast Elizaveta Nazarenkova. In the apparatus finals, she won gold in hoop, silver in clubs, and bronze in hoop, and she finished 6th in ball. Hayakawa then finished 7th in all-around at the 2015 Summer Universiade and qualified to three event finals. In August, Hayakawa finished 16th in the all-around at the 2015 Sofia World Cup behind American Laura Zeng. At the 2015 World Cup Final in Kazan, Hayakawa finished 23rd in the all-around. On 9–13 September, Hayakawa (together with teammates Kaho Minagawa and Uzume Kawasaki) competed at the 2015 World Championships in Stuttgart, where Team Japan finished 6th. Hayakwa qualified for the all-around finals and ended in 17th place with a total of 69.065 points. On October 2–4, Hayakawa, together with teammates Kaho Minagawa and junior Ruriko Shibayama, represented Aeon at the 2015 Aeon Cup in Tokyo, Japan. Hayakawa finished 6th in the all-around finals with a total of 69.466 points and Team Japan was 4th in the overall standings.

In 2016, the Japanese gymnastics federation used the 2016 World Cup series to decide whether Hayakawa or Minagawa should compete at the 2016 Summer Olympics, as Japan could only send one individual. Hayakawa started her season competing at the Espoo World Cup, where she finished 10th in the all-around and qualified to the hoop, ball finals. On April 1–3, she competed at the Pesaro World Cup. She was 15th in the all-around and 5th in the clubs final. She missed the 2016 Asian Championships due to an arm injury. Hayakawa then competed at the Sofia World Cup and finished 16th in the all-around. On 3–5 June, Hayakawa finished 14th in the all-around at her last competition, the Guadalajara World Cup, with a total of 69.300 points. Minagawa placed over her at three of the four events and was thus chosen for the Olympics over Hayakawa.

== Eponymous skill ==
Hayakawa has one eponymous skill listed in the code of points, a turn on a flat foot in penché with a ring position (foot bent toward head). Her skill was added to the code in 2015.

Name	Description	Difficulty (Note: Valid for the 2022-2024 Code of Points)
Sakura	Penché: body bent at the horizontal or below, rotation on flat foot with ring	0.5 base value

== Routine music information ==
Year	Apparatus	Music title
2016	Hoop	Love Story Theme by Arthur Fiedler
2016	Ball	Notte Stellata (The Swan) by Il Volo
2016	Clubs	La cumparsita by Danny Malando
2016	Ribbon	Monologue: Nurida, Schahriar's Variation, Orgy, Duet: Schahriar And Scheherazade, Mardshana's Dance by Fikret Amirov
2015	Hoop	Dicitencello Vuje by Renzo Arbore
2015	Ball	And The Waltz Goes On by André Rieu
2015	Clubs	Historia de un Amor by Carlos Eleta Almarán
2015	Ribbon	La Bayadere by London Symphony Orchestra
2014	Hoop	Dicitencello Vuje by Renzo Arbore
2014	Ball	Brindisi music by André Rieu
2014	Clubs	Primavera Tango by Gustavo Montesano & Royal Philharmonic Orchestra & Carlos Gomez
2014	Ribbon	La Bayadere by London Symphony Orchestra
2013	Hoop	?
2013	Ball	Brindisi music by André Rieu
2013	Clubs	Primavera Tango by Royal Philharmonic Orchestra, Gustavo Montesanos Gonzales, Carlos Gome
2013	Ribbon	Volt by Ikegawa Brothers
