= Uzume Kawasaki =

Japanese rhythmic gymnast (born 1997)

- 河崎 羽珠愛
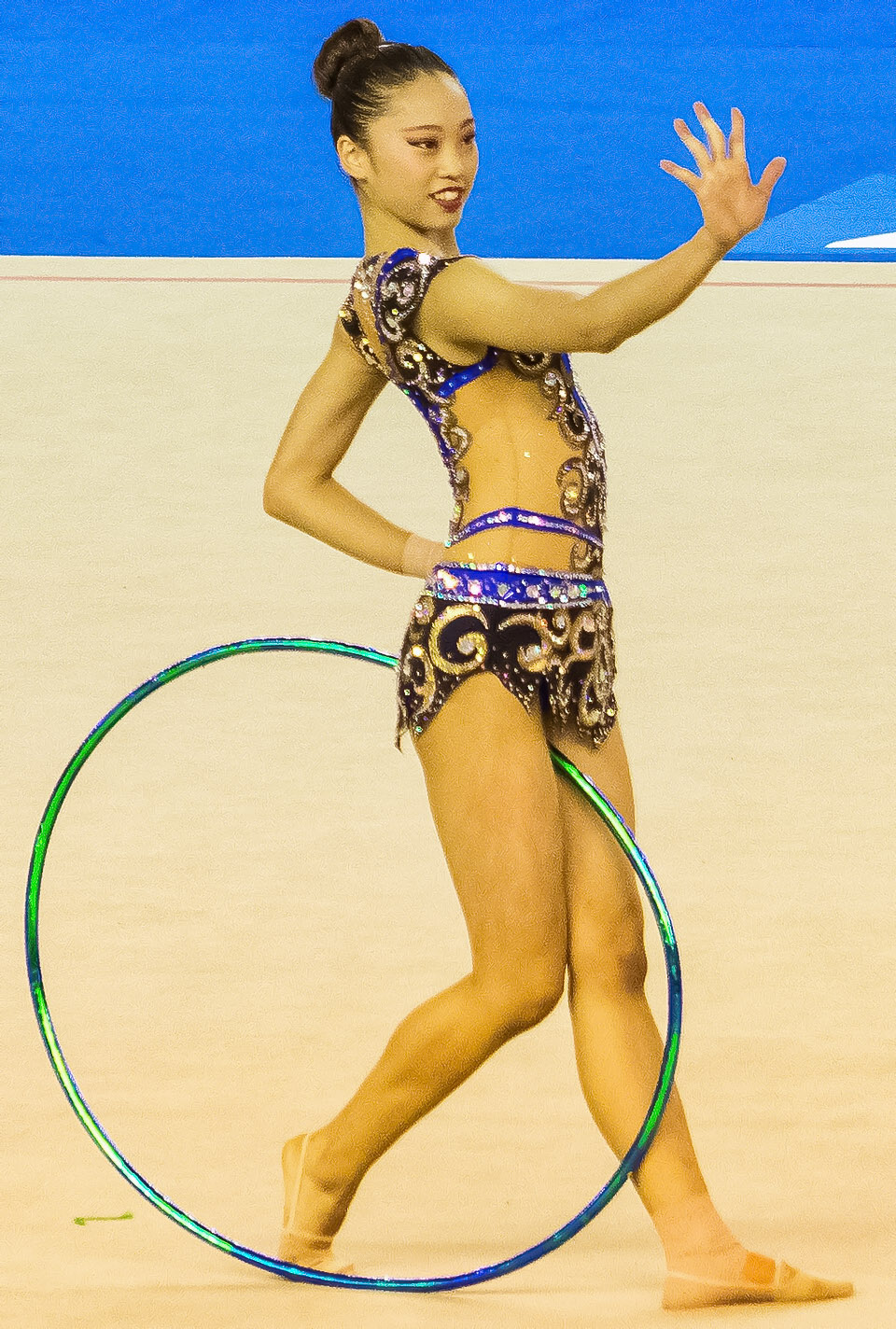
- Kawasaki at the 2017 Summer Universiade

Personal information
- Born: 26 September 1997 (age 29) Chiba Prefecture
- Height: 165 cm (5 ft 5 in)

Gymnastics career
- Discipline: Rhythmic gymnastics
- Country represented: Japan; (2015-2018)

Uzume Kawasaki (河崎 羽珠愛; born 26 September 1997) is a Japanese retired individual rhythmic gymnast. She is a 3-time (2014–2016) Japanese champion, and she competed at the 2014 and 2018 Asian Games.

== Early and personal life ==
Kawasaki was named for Ame-no-Uzume, a goddess known for dancing, as her father liked Japanese mythology. She began gymnastics at age 5 and started competing at age 10. Her favorite apparatus was the clubs.

Kawasaki studied sports science at Waseda University.

== Career ==
Kawasaki was not considered an exceptional gymnast through middle school, and she considered quitting the sport as she felt that she did not measure up to other gymnasts her age. However, in her first year of high school in 2013, she won a youth championship with clean routines, which grew her confidence.

The next year, she won the All-Japan High School Championships. In October, she represented Japan at the 2014 Asian Games, along with Sakura Hayakawa, Kaho Minagawa, and Maho Mikami. She competed with only two apparatuses, hoop and ribbon, and placed 4th in the team competition with her teammates. In November, she won her first all-around title at the Japanese Championships. Kawasaki said she had always performed in a lively way, no matter what music she used, but that she had begun to perform to dramatic music like that used by figure skaters Mao Asada and Daisuke Takahashi. She also said she had studied the movements of figure skaters to improve her expressiveness.

In 2015, Kawasaki was second at the selection competition for the World Championships and was therefore chosen for the team. At the World Championships, she performed with clubs, where she ranked 36th, and ribbon, where she ranked 28th. The Japanese team placed 6th. In November, she won her second consecutive Japanese title.

At the 2016 Asian Championships, Kawasaki placed 7th and qualified for three apparatus finals. She finished 8th with ball and clubs and 7th with ribbon. She won her third consecutive title in November after recovering from mistakes such as dropping her apparatus. In December, she had surgery on her foot.

In 2017, Kawasaki competed in the All-Japan University Championships, where she placed second. She also competed at the 2017 Summer Universiade, where she was 13th in the all-around and 5th in the ribbon final. At the Japanese Championships, she tied for second with Chisaki Oiwa.

In 2018, she competed at her second Asian Games. She finished 12th in the qualification round and 4th in the team event. Kawasaki recalled that her strong desire to medal in international competition worked against her, and she did not feel she was able to give as dynamic a performance as usual. Her disappointment caused her to lose confidence heading into the Japanese Championships. In addition, she struggled with recent rule changes that removed the limit on routine difficulty; Kawasaki considered herself to have less flexibility than usual for a rhythmic gymnast, and she struggled to incorporate more difficulty, including moves that required lower back flexibility. She finished the Championships in 6th place.

Kawasaki competed at the national team selection trials in 2019, but she felt nervous and made several mistakes. Although she had dreamed of competing in the 2020 Summer Olympics, she began to accept that it was unlikely she would be selected and began to focus on enjoying her participation in gymnastics. She planned to begin coaching in her former club after she graduated. At the Japanese Championships, she tied for 5th with Aino Yamada.
