= 2015 Asian Rhythmic Gymnastics Championships =

International rhythmic gymnastics competition

The 7th Rhythmic Gymnastics Asian Championships was held in Jecheon, South Korea from 10–13 June 2015.

== Medal winners ==
Event	Gold	Silver	Bronze
All-around Finals
Team	Uzbekistan; Elizaveta Nazarenkova; Anastasiya Serdyukova; Anora Davlyvatova	South Korea; Cheon Song-Yi; Son Yeon-Jae; Lee Da-ae	Kazakhstan; Sabina Ashirbayeva; Aliya Assymova; Selina Zhumatayeva
Individual	Son Yeon-Jae; South Korea	Elizaveta Nazarenkova; Uzbekistan	Sakura Hayakawa; Japan
Apparatus Finals
Hoop	Son Yeon-Jae; South Korea	Anastasiya Serdyukova; Uzbekistan	Sakura Hayakawa; Japan
Ball	Son Yeon-Jae; South Korea	Elizaveta Nazarenkova; Uzbekistan	Sabina Ashirbayeva; Kazakhstan
Clubs	Elizaveta Nazarenkova; Uzbekistan	Sakura Hayakawa; Japan	Kaho Minagawa; Japan
Clubs	Elizaveta Nazarenkova; Uzbekistan	Sakura Hayakawa; Japan	Sabina Ashirbayeva; Kazakhstan
Ribbon	Sakura Hayakawa; Japan	Anastasiya Serdyukova; Uzbekistan	Kaho Minagawa; Japan
Ribbon	Sakura Hayakawa; Japan	Anastasiya Serdyukova; Uzbekistan	Son Yeon-Jae; South Korea
Group Finals
Group All-around	China	Japan	Uzbekistan
5 Ribbons	China	Japan	Uzbekistan
3 Clubs + 2 Hoops	Japan	China	Kazakhstan

== Medal table ==
Rank	Nation	Gold	Silver	Bronze	Total
1	South Korea (KOR)	3	1	1	5
2	Uzbekistan (UZB)	2	4	2	8
3	Japan (JPN)	2	3	4	9
4	China (CHN)	2	1	0	3
5	Kazakhstan (KAZ)	0	0	4	4
Totals (5 entries)		9	9	11	29
