= Salome Pazhava =

Georgian rhythmic gymnast

- Alternative name: Salome Phajava
- Nickname: Sali
- Born: 3 September 1997 (age 29) Moscow, Russia
- Height: 158 cm (5 ft 2 in)

Gymnastics career
- Discipline: Rhythmic gymnastics
- Country represented: Georgia; (2010 - 2021)
- Club: Neli Saladze Academy
- Head coach: Eliso Bedoshvili
- Assistant coach: Lali Dolidze
- Choreographer: Inesa Meladze
- Retired: 2021
- World ranking: 30 WCC (2017 Season); 13 (2016 Season); 17 (2015 Season); 20 (2014 Season); 34 (2013 Season)
Medal record
Representing Georgia
Rhythmic gymnastics
Event	1st	2nd	3rd
FIG World Cup	0	0	4
Total	0	0	4
European Games
Bronze medal – third place	2015 Baku	Ribbon
Junior European Championships
Bronze medal – third place	2012 Nizhny Novgorod	Team

Salome Pazhava (Georgian: სალომე ფაჟავა; born 3 September 1997) is a Georgian former individual rhythmic gymnast. She finished 4th in All-around at the 2015 World Championships.

== Personal life ==
Pazhava was born to Georgian parents in Moscow, Russia. She began gymnastics at age one, after participating in dance and swimming. In 2008, she moved to Georgia with her grandmother. She speaks Georgian, Russian, and English.

== Junior career ==
Pazhava started appearing in international junior competitions in 2005. She was a member of the Georgian junior team that won the team bronze medal at the 2012 European Junior Championships in Nizhny Novgorod, Russia. She finished 6th in the ribbon final.

== Senior career ==
=== 2013 ===
In 2013, Pazhava debuted as a senior and competed in the World Cup and Grand Prix Series. At the 2013 World Cup series in Corbeil-Essonnes, France, she was 17th, in St.Petersburg, Russia, she finished 13th in All-Around. In June she was selected for the European Championships in Vienna, being 14th in teams. She competed in her first Worlds at the 2013 World Championships in Kyiv, Ukraine where she finished 20th in the All-around final. She has appeared in the show Georgia's Got Talent!, performing a traditional Georgian dance.

=== 2014 ===
In 2014, Pazhava started her season at the 2014 Moscow Grand Prix, finishing 9th in all-around, qualifying for event finals in clubs and ribbon. She then competed at the 2014 Stuttgart World Cup where she finished 14th in the all-around. At the 2014 MTM International Tournament, Pazhava won the all-around bronze medal behind France's Kseniya Moustafaeva. On 9–11 May she competed at the 2014 Corbeil-Essonnes World Cup and finished 9th in all-around with an overall score of 67.666 points.

At the 2014 Minsk World Cup, Pazhava finished 15th in all-around. In June, she competed at the 2014 European Championships and finished 9th in all-around with a total of 68.316 points. In September, at the 2014 World Cup series in Kazan, Russia, she placed 16th in all-around and qualified to two event finals, finishing 6th in ribbon and 8th in clubs. On 22–28 September she represented Georgia at the 2014 World Championships, finishing 13th in the all-around finals with a total score 67.182 points. On 17–19 October she finished 6th in the all-around finals behind Katsiaryna Halkina at the 2014 Aeon Cup in Tokyo, Japan.

=== 2015 ===
In 2015, Pazhava began the season at the 2015 Moscow Grand Prix, finishing 11th in the all-around. She qualified to two event finals taking the bronze in clubs. On 10–12 April she placed 8th in all-around at the 2015 Pesaro World Cup with a score of 69.500 points, and qualified to two apparatus finals, placing 7th in ball and clubs.

At the 2015 European Championships, Team Georgia finished 8th and Pazhava qualified to all four event finals – placing 4th in hoop, 6th in ball, 7th in clubs and 6th in ribbon. At the 2015 Holon Grand Prix, she finished 6th in all-around with a total of 71.683 points. She qualified to all four event finals. At the 2015 Grand Prix Berlin, Pazhava finished 6th in all-around with a total of 70.900 points and qualified to all four event finals.

On 15–21 June Pazhava competed at the inaugural 2015 European Games where she finished 5th in the all-around with a total score of 71.900 points. She qualified to all four apparatus finals, taking a historic bronze medal in ribbon (a first for a Georgian rhythmic gymnast in any continental competition); she finished 4th in hoop, ball and clubs. At the 2015 World Cup series in Kazan, Pazhava finished 6th in the all-around with a total of 69.950 points and qualified to three apparatus finals. She placed 8th in hoop after a drop and finishing the routine without apparatus, and 7th in ball with two drops. Performing her last routine, she won the bronze medal in clubs, becoming the first Georgian gymnast to win a medal at a World Cup stage.

In September, Pazhava qualified to two apparatus finals at the 2015 World Championships in Stuttgart; she finished 7th in hoop (17.766) and 5th in clubs (18.000). In the all-around finals, she narrowly missed the bronze medal, scoring a total of 71.782 points and finishing in 4th place behind Belarusian Melitina Staniouta. At the 2015 Aeon Cup, held in October in Tokyo, Pazhava finished 5th in the individual all-around finals with a total of 71.099 points.

=== 2016 ===
In 2016, Pazhava began her season at the 2016 Grand Prix Moscow, finishing 7th in the all-around with a total of 71.748 and winning the bronze medal in the hoop final. After recovering from a minor leg injury, Pazhava returned to competition in May at the Brno Grand Prix. She finished 6th in the all-around with a total of 70.750 points and she qualified to three apparatus finals, taking bronze in clubs, and placing 4th in ball and hoop.

In May, Pazhava finished 4th in the all-around with a total of 72.850 points at the 2016 Grand Prix Bucharest behind Russian Dina Averina. Having qualified to all apparatus finals, she won gold in clubs ahead of Averina and two silver medals (hoop and ribbon), and placed 5th in ball. At the 2016 Guadalajara World Cup, she finished 6th in the all-around and qualified to all four apparatus finals.

In June, Pazhava finished fifth at the 2016 European Championships, scoring a new personal best total of 73.433 points. At the 2016 Berlin World Cup in July, she won the all-around bronze with a total of 73.150 (tied with Katsiaryna Halkina) and qualified to all apparatus finals; she won bronze in ball and ribbon (tied with Staniouta) and placed 7th in hoop and clubs. Pazhava then finished 8th in the all-around behind Marina Durunda at the 2016 Kazan World Cup with a total of 72.000 points. She qualified to all apparatus finals; during her last event in ribbon, Pazhava scored 0 points as her music stopped halfway even as she performed her ribbon routine twice.

On 19–20 August Pazhava competed at the 2016 Summer Olympics held in Rio de Janeiro, Brazil. She finished in 14th place with a score of 69.115 in the rhythmic gymnastics individual all-around qualifications, thus was unable to get into the top 10 finals. She competed at the Olympics with an injury.

=== 2017 ===
In 2017 Season, recovering from her previous injury, Pazhava suffered another setback injuring her arm, thus withdrawing her name in the entry list for the 2017 World Cup events. On 11–13 August Pazhava was able to recover and competed in the last event of the World Cup series, at the 2017 Kazan World Challenge Cup where she finished 8th in the all-around. She qualified in 2 apparatus finals and finished 8th in clubs, 6th in ribbon. On 30 August - 3 September Pazhava was able to compete at the 2017 World Championships in Pesaro, Italy. She qualified in the clubs final and finished in 8th place, and also finished a disappointing 15th place in the all-around final after multiple errors and drops of her apparatus. On 5–6 November Pazhava competed at the 2017 Dalia Kutkaite Cup finishing 7th in the all-around.

=== 2018 ===
Pazhava started the season with a competition at the 2018 Moscow Grand Prix finishing 6th in the all-around behind Belarusian Katsiaryna Halkina, she qualified into the hoop, ball and ribbon finals. On 7–8 April she competed at the RG Tournament Irina Cup in Warsaw, Poland where she won bronze medal in the all-around. On 27–29 April Pazhava returned to competition in a World Cup event at the 2018 Baku World Cup where she won finished 14th in the all-around. On 16–17 May Pazhava competed at the 2018 Holon Grand Prix, finishing 6th in the all-around, she qualified in 2 apparatus finals and won her first Grand Prix medal gold (in clubs), she finished 5th in the hoop final. In September she was selected for the World Championships in Sofia, she was 21st in the All-Around and took 7th place in the clubs final.

=== 2019 ===
Salome started her season at the World Cup in Pesaro, being 7th overall, 7th with clubs and 4th with ribbon. In June she took 10th place in the All-Around at the European Games in Minsk. A month later she ended 7th overall, 6th with ball, 5th with clubs and 4th with ribbon at the University Games in Naples. In August she was 19th at the World Cup in Minsk, also being 4th with clubs. In Cluj-Napoca she ended 6th in the All-Around, 7th with hoop, 8th with clubs and 6th with ribbon. Selected for the World Championships in Baku Salome ended 18th in the All-Around, a place short of the direct qualification for the Olympic Games.

=== 2021 ===
In May Salome was 35th at the World Cup in Baku and at the end of the month she was 17th. Competing at the European Championships in Varna she took 20th place in the All-Around. In Minsk she was 7th overall, 8th with hoop, 7th with ball and clubs and 4th with ribbon. At the 2020 Olympic Games, after earning a quota thanks to reallocation, Pazhava finished seventeenth in the qualification round for the individual all-around.

She ended her career after the Olympics.

== Routine music information ==
Year	Apparatus	Music title
2021	Hoop	Unstoppable by E.S. Posthumus
2021	Ball	Обійми by Okean Elzy
2021	Clubs	Rachuli, Mokle Kaba by Jgufi Bani
2021	Ribbon (first)	Xap by The Hit House
2021	Ribbon (second)	Supremacy by Muse
2020	Hoop	Poeta en el viento by Vicente Amigo
2020	Ball	Обійми by Okean Elzy
2020	Clubs	Bohemian Rhapsody by Queen
2020	Ribbon	Xap by The Hit House
2019	Hoop	Run Boy Run by Woodkid
2019	Ball	The Untold by Secession Studios
2019	Clubs	Carlifornia Dreamin by 33 Tours
2019	Ribbon	Bohemian Rhapsody by Queen
2018	Hoop	In This Shirt by The Irrepressibles
2018	Ball	Megi Gogitidze by Nu Geshinia
2018	Clubs	Hero With A Red Mask by Rok Nardin
2018	Ribbon	Fuyu no Samu - Sa by Martin Barra
2017	Hoop	In This Shirt by The Irrepressibles
2017	Ball	Nu Geshinia by Megi Gogitidze
2017	Clubs	Hero with a Red Mask by Rok Nardin
2017	Ribbon	Epilogue, The End (La La Land OST) by Justin Hurwitz
2016	Hoop	Unstoppable by E.S. Posthumus
2016	Ball	Chalkboard by Jóhann Jóhannsson
2016	Clubs	Rachuli, Mokle Kaba by Jgufi Bani
2016	Ribbon	Supremacy by Muse
2015	Hoop	Unstoppable by E.S. Posthumus
2015	Ball	Taka Yak Ty by Okean Elzy
2015	Clubs	Rachuli, Mokle Kaba by Jgufi Bani
2015	Ribbon	Hit the Road Jack by Ray Charles
2014	Hoop	Pango Pango by The Atomic Fireballs
2014	Ball	Taka Yak Ti by Okean Elzy
2014	Clubs	Rachuli, Mokle Kaba by Jgufi Bani
2014	Ribbon	Black Or White by Michael Jackson
2013	Hoop	Pango Pango by The Atomic Fireballs
2013	Ball	Taka Yak Ti by Okean Elzy
2013	Clubs	Rachuli, Mokle Kaba by Jgufi Bani
2013	Ribbon	Black Or White by Michael Jackson
