= Gymnastics at the 2016 Summer Olympics – Women's rhythmic individual all-around =

Women's rhythmic individual all-around at the Games of the XXXI Olympiad
- Venue: HSBC Arena
- Date: 19 August 2016 (qualification); 20 August 2016 (final)
- Competitors: 26 from 24 nations
- Winning total: 76.483 points

Medalists
1st place, gold medalist(s)		Margarita Mamun	Russia
2nd place, silver medalist(s)		Yana Kudryavtseva	Russia
3rd place, bronze medalist(s)		Ganna Rizatdinova	Ukraine

The Women's rhythmic individual all-around competition at the 2016 Summer Olympics was held at the Arena Olímpica do Rio.

The medals were presented by Russians Alexander Zhukov, an IOC member, and Nataliya Kuzmina, president of the Rhythmic Gymnastics Technical Committee of the FIG.

== Competition format ==
The competition consisted of a qualification round and a final round. The top ten gymnasts in the qualification round advanced to the final round. In each round, the gymnasts performed four routines (ball, hoop, clubs, and ribbon), with the scores added to give a total.

== Qualification ==
Rank	Name	Hoop (rhythmic gymnastics)	Ball (rhythmic gymnastics)	Clubs (rhythmic gymnastics)	Ribbon (rhythmic gymnastics)	Total	Qualification
1	Margarita Mamun (RUS)	18.833	19.000	17.500	19.050	74.383	Q
2	Yana Kudryavtseva (RUS)	18.166	18.616	19.000	18.216	73.998	Q
3	Ganna Rizatdinova (UKR)	18.400	18.566	18.466	18.500	73.932	Q
4	Melitina Staniouta (BLR)	18.400	17.650	18.350	18.175	72.575	Q
5	Son Yeon-jae (KOR)	17.466	18.266	18.358	17.866	71.956	Q
6	Neviana Vladinova (BUL)	17.666	17.700	17.800	17.800	70.966	Q
7	Carolina Rodríguez (ESP)	17.566	17.750	17.833	17.366	70.515	Q
8	Marina Durunda (AZE)	17.466	17.466	17.683	17.733	70.348	Q
9	Katsiaryna Halkina (BLR)	17.733	17.733	17.200	17.466	70.132	Q
10	Kseniya Moustafaeva (FRA)	17.600	17.516	17.500	17.366	69.982	Q
11	Laura Zeng (USA)	17.650	17.666	17.700	16.825	69.841	R
12	Sabina Ashirbayeva (KAZ)	17.183	17.283	17.400	17.366	69.232	R
13	Neta Rivkin (ISR)	17.041	17.866	17.533	16.783	69.223	
14	Salome Pazhava (GEO)	17.233	17.783	17.433	16.666	69.115	
15	Varvara Filiou (GRE)	17.208	17.333	17.333	16.750	68.624	
16	Kaho Minagawa (JPN)	16.666	17.341	17.500	17.016	68.523	
17	Anastasiya Serdyukova (UZB)	17.166	17.100	17.316	16.908	68.490	
18	Jana Berezko-Marggrander (GER)	17.100	16.983	17.100	17.066	68.249	
19	Veronica Bertolini (ITA)	17.516	16.550	17.541	16.400	68.007	
20	Nicol Ruprecht (AUT)	16.833	16.666	17.166	17.033	67.698	
21	Ekaterina Volkova (FIN)	16.916	16.966	17.000	16.633	67.515	
22	Ana Luiza Filiorianu (ROU)	16.850	16.800	16.808	17.000	67.458	
23	Natália Gaudio (BRA)	16.566	16.300	16.450	16.216	65.532	
24	Shang Rong (CHN)	16.566	16.766	15.716	15.966	65.014	
25	Danielle Prince (AUS)	14.500	15.250	15.716	15.550	61.016	
26	Elyane Boal (CPV)	9.833	10.033	9.991	8.783	38.640	

== Final ==
Rank	Name	Hoop (rhythmic gymnastics)	Ball (rhythmic gymnastics)	Clubs (rhythmic gymnastics)	Ribbon (rhythmic gymnastics)	Total
1st place, gold medalist(s)	Margarita Mamun (RUS)	19.050 (2)	19.150 (2)	19.050 (1)	19.233 (2)	76.483
2nd place, silver medalist(s)	Yana Kudryavtseva (RUS)	19.225 (1)	19.250 (1)	17.883 (5)	19.250 (1)	75.608
3rd place, bronze medalist(s)	Ganna Rizatdinova (UKR)	18.200 (4)	18.450 (3)	18.450 (2)	18.483 (3)	73.583
4	Son Yeon-jae (KOR)	18.216 (3)	18.266 (4)	18.300 (3)	18.116 (4)	72.898
5	Melitina Staniouta (BLR)	18.200 (4)	18.250 (5)	16.633 (10)	18.050 (5)	71.133
6	Katsiaryna Halkina (BLR)	17.966 (6)	17.966 (6)	17.650 (8)	17.350 (7)	70.932
7	Neviana Vladinova (BUL)	17.883 (7)	17.750 (7)	18.050 (4)	17.050 (8)	70.733
8	Carolina Rodríguez (ESP)	17.616 (9)	17.683 (8)	17.700 (7)	16.950 (9)	69.949
9	Marina Durunda (AZE)	16.950 (10)	17.541 (9)	17.716 (6)	17.541 (6)	69.748
10	Kseniya Moustafaeva (FRA)	17.700 (8)	16.883 (10)	16.916 (9)	16.741 (10)	68.240
