= Elizaveta Nazarenkova =

Russian rhythmic gymnast

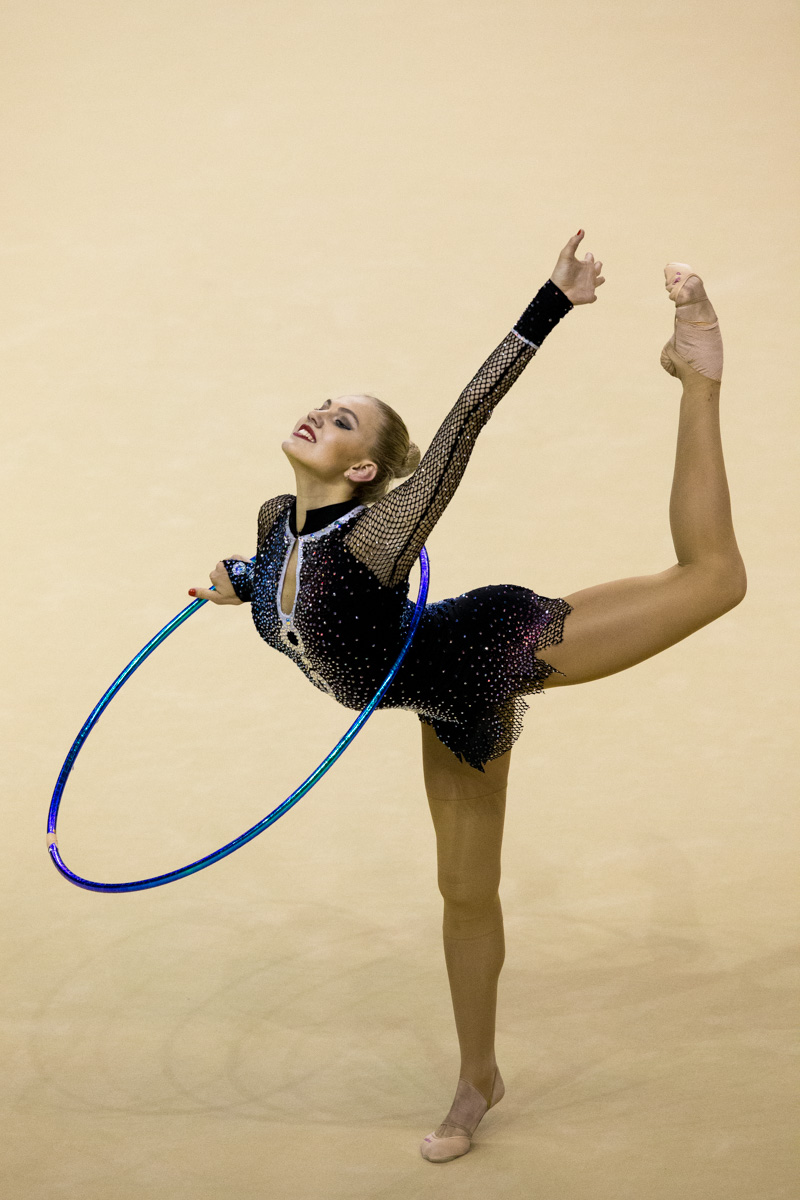
- Nazarenkova performing with the hoop at the 2016 Gymnastics Olympic Test Event

Personal information
- Full name: Elizaveta Sergeyevna Nazarenkova
- Nickname: Lizzy
- Born: 27 August 1995 (age 31) Murmansk, Russia

Gymnastics career
- Discipline: Rhythmic gymnastics
- Country represented: Uzbekistan; (2010 - present)
- Former countries represented: Russia
- College team: Lesgaft National State University, St. Petersburg
- Club: Gazprom
- Gym: Novogorsk
- Head coach: Irina Viner
- Assistant coach: Natalia Gorbulina
- Retired: yes
- World ranking: 32 (2016 Season); 11 (2015 Season); 11 (2014 Season)
Medal record
Rhythmic gymnastics
Representing Uzbekistan
Asian Championships
Gold medal – first place	2015 Jecheon	Clubs
Gold medal – first place	2015 Jecheon	Team
Silver medal – second place	2016 Tashkent	All-around
Silver medal – second place	2016 Tashkent	Clubs
Silver medal – second place	2015 Jecheon	All-around
Silver medal – second place	2015 Jecheon	Ball
Bronze medal – third place	2016 Tashkent	Hoop
Bronze medal – third place	2016 Tashkent	Ball
Bronze medal – third place	2016 Tashkent	Ribbon
Representing Russia
World Games
Bronze medal – third place	2013 Cali	Hoop

Elizaveta Sergeyevna Nazarenkova (Russian: Елизавета Сергеевна Назаренкова; born 27 August 1995) is a retired Russian individual rhythmic gymnast who competed for Uzbekistan. She is a two-time all-around silver medalist at the Asian Championships.

== Gymnastics career ==
Nazerenkova's parents are both athletes; Nazarenkova's father is a master of sports in swimming, and her mother has the same title in rhythmic gymnastics. At first, Nazarenkova trained under the guidance of her mother in Murmansk Sports School of Olympic Reserve for Children and Youth-13, but she was later invited to train under the Russian training center in Novogorsk.

In 2013, Nazarenkova won the bronze medal in hoop at the 2013 World Games in Cali, Colombia. She competed in her first World Cup event at the 2014 Debrecen World Cup and won bronze in the all-around and clubs, a silver in ribbon.

=== Competing for Uzbekistan ===
==== 2014 season ====
In May 2014, Nazarenkova switched nationality to compete for Uzbekistan.

On 22–24 May, she competed at the 2014 Tashkent World Cup, where she finished 8th in the all-around. She won her first World Cup medal representing Uzbekistan, a bronze medal in clubs final (tied with Azerbaijan's Marina Durunda). She then competed at the 2014 Minsk World Cup and finished 16th in the all-around.

On 4–6 July, Nazarenkova competed at the Izmir Tournament Cup and won the all-around bronze medal behind Maria Titova. In the event finals, she won gold in clubs, silver in ribbon and bronze in hoop. On 8–10 August, Nazarenkova competed at the 2014 Sofia World Cup where she placed 8th in the all-around with a total of 67.950 points and qualified to three event finals. She finished 5th with both clubs and ball and 7th in ribbon behind Varvara Filiou. On 5–7 September, Nazarenkova competed at the 2014 World Cup Final in Kazan. There she placed 8th in the all-around and qualified for three apparatus finals.

On 22–28 September, Nazarenkova (along with her teammates Djamila Rakhmatova and Anastasiya Serdyukova) represented Uzbekistan at the 2014 World Championships. Team Uzbekistan finished in 8th place in the team competition, and she placed 15th in the all-around finals with a total of 65.524 points.

==== 2015 season ====
In 2015, Nazarenkova began the season by competing at the 2015 Moscow Grand Prix, where she was 19th in the all-around. On 21–22 March, she competed at the 2015 Thiais Grand Prix and placed 6th in the all-around.

She then competed at the 2015 Bucharest World Cup, and she finished 8th in the all-around. She also finished 9th in the all-around at the 2015 Pesaro World Cup and 7th at the Tashkent World Cup and qualified for two apparatus finals at each event. At the 2015 Grand Prix Berlin, she placed 7th with a total of 70.450 points and qualified to three event finals.

Nazarenkova won the all-around silver at the 2015 Asian Championships behind Korean Son Yeon-Jae, and in the apparatus finals, she won gold in clubs and silver in ball. At the 2015 Summer Universiade, she placed 7th and qualified for three event finals.

In August, she competed at the 2015 Budapest World Cup, where she was 9th in the all-around and qualified to all four apparatus finals. She placed 5th in ribbon, 6th in clubs, ball and 8th in hoop. She then finished 12th in the all-around at the 2015 Sofia World Cup behind Israeli Victoria Veinberg Filanovsky. At the 2015 World Cup Final in Kazan, Nazarenkova finished 11th in the all-around and qualified to the ball finals.

On 9–13 September, Nazarenkova (together with her teammates Anastasiya Serdyukova and Anora Davlyatova) competed at the 2015 World Championships in Stuttgart. The team once again finished 8th in the team competition. Nazarenkova qualified for the all-around finals, where she finished in 16th place with a total of 69.282 points.

==== 2016 season ====
Nazarenkova suffered a leg injury early in the season. On 1–3 April, she returned to competition at the 2016 Pesaro World Cup, where she finished 21st in the all-around. On 21–22 April, she competed at the 2016 Gymnastics Olympic Test Event held in Rio de Janeiro; however, she finished a disappointing 11th place and did not qualify in top 8 highest score for gymnasts who had not qualified for the Olympics, which would have allowed her to compete there. Her teammate Anastasiya Serdyukova, who finished 5th, won an Olympics quota for the 2016 Rio Olympics.

At the 2016 Asian Championships, held in Tashkent, Nazarenkova repeated as silver medalist in the all-around with 71.450 points. On 13–15 May, she competed at the 2016 Tashkent World Cup, finishing 8th in the all-around. She qualified for three apparatus finals and won bronze in clubs.

== Routine music information ==
Year	Apparatus	Music title
2016	Hoop	Grand Guignol by Bajofondo
2016	Ball	Fever by Bette Midler
2016	Clubs	Burned Letter by James Newton
2016	Ribbon	Chopin Impression by Jan Vayne
2015	Hoop	Grand Guignol by Bajofondo
2015	Ball	Walk Away by Christina Aguilera
2015	Clubs	Burned Letter by James Newton
2015	Ribbon	Concerto Grosso No. 1 by Alfred Schnittke
2014	Hoop	Grand Guignol by Bajofondo
2014	Ball	La Vie En Rose
2014	Clubs	Tout Dit & Paris By Camille
2014	Ribbon	Concierto De Aranjuez by André Rieu
2013	Hoop	Fantasy - Overture for Orchestra in B minor music from Romeo and Juliet by Pyotr Tchaikovsky
2013	Ball	Caruso by Katherine Jenkins
2013	Clubs	Love by B-Tribe
2013	Ribbon	Liebesträume by Franz Liszt
2012	Hoop	Who's That Creepin'? by Big Bad Voodoo Daddy
2012	Ball	
2012	Clubs	Malaguena by Caterina Valente
2012	Ribbon	Feeling Good music from Origin of Symmetry by Muse

== See also ==
- Nationality changes in gymnastics
