= Djamila Rakhmatova =

Uzbekistani rhythmic gymnast (born 1990)

- Born: September 19, 1990 (age 36) Tashkent

Gymnastics career
- Discipline: Rhythmic gymnastics
- Country represented: Uzbekistan; (2002)
- Club: Ruvshsm
- Head coach: Valentina Shevchenko
- Assistant coach: Talia Abduramanova
- Choreographer: Ildar Kolesyanov
- Retired: 2015
- World ranking: 16 (2014 Season); 15 (2013 Season); 21 (2012 Season); 37 (2011 Season)
Medal record
Representing Uzbekistan
Rhythmic Gymnastics
Asian Games
Gold medal – first place	2014 Incheon	Team
Silver medal – second place	2010 Guangzhou	Team
Grand Prix Final
Silver medal – second place	2013 Berlin	Ribbon
Asian Championships
Gold medal – first place	2013 Tashkent	Team
Silver medal – second place	2011 Astana	Clubs
Silver medal – second place	2013 Tashkent	All-around
Silver medal – second place	2013 Tashkent	Ball
Bronze medal – third place	2009 Astana	Team
Bronze medal – third place	2011 Astana	Team
Bronze medal – third place	2013 Tashkent	Hoop
Bronze medal – third place	2013 Tashkent	Ribbon
Bronze medal – third place	2013 Tashkent	Clubs

Djamila Rakhmatova (Russian: Джамиля Рахматова; born 19 September 1990) is a retired individual Uzbekistani rhythmic gymnast.

== Career ==
A member of the Uzbek National gymnastics team since 2002, Rakhmatova has competed in 5 World Championships, she had her highest placement at the 2013 World Championships in Kyiv, Ukraine finishing 18th in the All-around.

She and the Uzbek Team won Team silver medal at the 2010 Asian Games. She won silver in the All-around at the 2013 Asian Championships. She finished 10th in all-around at the 2013 Grand Prix Final in Berlin and won silver medal in ribbon final.

In 2014 season, Rakhmatova competed at the 2014 Stuttgart World Cup and finished 15th in the all-around. She then competed at the 2014 Lisboa World Cup where he finished 10th in the all-around. On May 9–11, Rakhmatova competed at the 2014 Corbeil-Essonnes World Cup and finished 17th in all-around. On May 22–24, Rakhmatova competed at the 2014 Tashkent World Cup where she finished 9th in all-around behind teammate Elizaveta Nazarenkova. Rakhmatova then competed at the 2014 Minsk World Cup where she finished 8th in all-around behind Marina Durunda, she qualified to 1 event final finishing 5th place in ribbon. On August 8–10, Rakhmatova competed at the 2014 Sofia World Cup finishing 12th in all-around and qualified to event final in ribbon finishing 8th behind teammate Elizaveta Nazarenkova. On September 5–7, at the 2014 World Cup Final in Kazan, Rakhmatova competed and finished 10th in all-around. At the 2014 World Championships, Rakhmatova finished 21st in all-around finals and Team Uzbekistan taking 8th place. She then competed at the 2014 Asian Games in Incheon, Korea where she finished 4th in all-around behind compatriot Anastasiya Serdyukova. She completed her career in 2015.

== Routine music information ==
Year	Apparatus	Music title
2014	Hoop	Carmen, music by Georges Bizet
2014	Ball	Feeling Good, music by Muse
2014	Clubs	Uzbek traditional
2014	Ribbon	A New Swan Queen, Night Of Terror, Perfection music from The Black Swan by Clint Mansell
2013	Hoop	Gone with the Wind Suite, music by Max Steiner
2013	Ball	?
2013	Clubs	Uzbek traditional
2013	Ribbon	Dark Eyes, music by André Rieu
2012	Hoop	Etude in D-sharp minor, Op. 8, No. 12, music from Alexander Scriabin by Maksim Mrvica
2012	Ball	La Morocha, music by Hector Varela
2012	Clubs	?
2012	Ribbon	Otchi Tchornia (Dark Eyes), music from Deer Hunter, (Russian traditional)
2011	Hoop	Etude in D-sharp minor, Op. 8, No. 12, music from Alexander Scriabin by Maksim Mrvica
2011	Ball	?
2011	Clubs	?
2011	Ribbon	Tarareando, music by Orchestra di Piazza Vittorio
