= Katsiaryna Halkina =

Belarusian rhythmic gymnast (born 1997)

- Full name: Katsiaryna Aliaksandraŭna Halkina
- Alternative name: Ekaterina Alexandrovna Galkina
- Nickname: Katya
- Born: 25 February 1997 (age 29) Minsk, Belarus
- Height: 168 cm (5 ft 6 in)

Gymnastics career
- Discipline: Rhythmic gymnastics
- Country represented: Belarus; (2009-2021)
- College team: Belarusian State University of Physical Education
- Club: Dinamo
- Head coach: Irina Leparskaya
- Assistant coaches: Liubov Charkashyna, Yuliya Kamarova
- Choreographer: Elena Manzalevskaya, Galina Ryzhaknova
- Retired: 18 June 2021
- World ranking: 7 WC (2019); 12 WC 6 WCC (2018); 7 WC 1 WCC (2017); 9 (2016); 7 (2015); 9 (2014); 11 (2013)
Medal record
Representing Belarus
Rhythmic gymnastics
World Championships
Silver medal – second place	2014 Izmir	Team
Silver medal – second place	2015 Stuttgart	Team
Silver medal – second place	2017 Pesaro	Clubs
Silver medal – second place	2018 Sofia	Clubs
Bronze medal – third place	2019 Baku	Team
European Championships
Silver medal – second place	2015 Minsk	Team
Silver medal – second place	2017 Budapest	Team
Silver medal – second place	2019 Baku	Team
Silver medal – second place	2019 Baku	Hoop
Bronze medal – third place	2013 Vienna	Team
Bronze medal – third place	2015 Minsk	Hoop
Bronze medal – third place	2015 Minsk	Clubs
Bronze medal – third place	2018 Guadalajara	All-Around
World Games
Bronze medal – third place	2017 Wrocław	Ball
Bronze medal – third place	2017 Wrocław	Ribbon
European Games
Silver medal – second place	2019 Minsk	Hoop
Bronze medal – third place	2019 Minsk	All-around
Junior European Championships
Silver medal – second place	2012 Nizhy Novgorod	Ball
Silver medal – second place	2012 Nizhy Novgorod	Ribbon
Silver medal – second place	2012 Nizhy Novgorod	Team

Katsiaryna Aliaksandraŭna Halkina (Belarusian: Кацярына Аляксандраўна Галкіна; Russian: Екатерина Александровна Галкина; born 25 February 1997) is a retired Belarusian individual rhythmic gymnast. She is the 2018 European all-around bronze medalist. She competed at the 2016 Summer Olympics in Rio, and finished 6th in the all-around final.

== Personal life ==
Halkina had heart surgery in 2011 and missed 12 months of competition. She announced her retirement from rhythmic gymnastics in June 2021. On 11 October 2021, she announced to fans via her Instagram account that she had moved to Moscow to begin a master's degree program at Moscow State Institute of International Relations. She is employed by the Embassy of Belarus in Moscow as of 2021.

== Career ==
=== Junior ===
Halkina began competing in the junior international scene in 2009, she won many medals as a junior, at the 2010 Pesaro Junior World Cup where she won gold in ball, hoop and silver in Team Event. At the 2010 Junior Grand Prix she won the all-around bronze medal. She won gold in hoop at the 2012 Pesaro Junior World Cup. At the 2012 European Junior Championships she and Team Belarus won the Team silver medal, she won silver in ribbon and ball final.

=== Senior ===
2013

In the 2013 season, Halkina debuted as a senior competing L.A. Lights. At the senior international division at the 2013 Holon Grand Prix she won silver in all-around and gold in ribbon and hoop final. She competed in her first World Cup at the 2013 Lisboa. At the 2013 Pesaro World Cup, Halkina qualified for all event finals, she finished 5th in hoop, 6th in ball and clubs, 7th in ball. At the 2013 Minsk World Cup, she finished 8th in all-around and finished 5th in ball and clubs final.

Halkina appeared in her first senior Europeans at the 2013 European Championships together with her teammates (Melitina Staniouta and Arina Charopa) where Team Belarus won the bronze medal. At the 2013 World Cup series in St.Petersburg, Russia, Halkina finished 7th in all-around behind Azeri gymnast Marina Durunda and again qualified to all 4 event finals. She then competed at the 2013 World Championships in Kyiv, Ukraine where she qualified and finished 8th in ball final. Halkina finished 15th at the 2013 World Championships All-around final. On October 25–27, Halkina competed at the World Club Championship, the 2013 Aeon Cup in Tokyo, Japan representing team Dinamo (together with teammate Melitina Staniouta) won the team silver. She finished 5th in the All-around finals ahead of Azeri gymnast Marina Durunda.

2014

In 2014, Halkina began her season by competing at the 2014 L.A. Lights and finished 6th in all-around. She qualified to 3 event finals and won a bronze medal in hoop. Halkina then competed in the first World Cup event of the season at the 2014 Debrecen World Cup where she finished 4th in the all-around and won bronze in hoop. At the 2014 Stuttgart World Cup, Halkina finished 12th in all-around and qualified to 2 event finals where she placed 7th in hoop and ball. Halkina then competed at the 2014 Baltic Hoop and won the all-around bronze behind Arina Averina, she won silver in hoop, ball and bronze in clubs, ribbon. Halkina's next World Cup event was at the 2014 Pesaro World Cup, where she finished 9th in all-around and qualified to 2 event finals finishing 5th in clubs and 6th in ribbon. Halkina then won the all-around gold at the 2014 MTM International Tournament with an overall score of 69.550 points. On May 3–5, Halkina then competed at the 2014 Kalamata Cup and won the all-around bronze behind. On May 9–11, Halkina finished 5th in all-around at the 2014 Corbeil-Essonnes World Cup, she qualified to 3 event finals and won silver in ball. On May 30-June 1, Halkina competed at the 2014 Minsk World Cup and finished 6th in all-around, she qualified to 3 event finals.

On June 10–15, Halkina competed at the 2014 European Championships and finished 7th in all-around. On August 8–10, Halkina finished 13th in all-around at the 2014 Sofia World Cup and qualified to 2 event finals, taking bronze in clubs and placing 4th in ribbon behind Maria Titova. On September 5–7, Halkina competed at the 2014 World Cup series in Kazan, finishing 4th in all-around with a total of 70.400 points, just behind teammate Melitina Staniouta, she qualified to all 4 event finals and won her 2 bronze medals (clubs, ribbon), 4th in ball and 6th in hoop. On September 22–28, Halkina (along with teammates Melitina Staniouta and Arina Charopa) represented Belarus at the 2014 World Championships where they took the Team silver with a total of 136.073 points. She qualified to 2 event finals (6th in ball, 8th in hoop) and finished 8th in the all-around behind compatriot Staniouta. On October 17–19, Halkina traveled in Tokyo for the 2014 Aeon Cup, representing team Dinamo club (together with teammates Melitina Staniouta and junior Mariya Trubach) won the team silver. She finished 5th in the All-around finals behind Ganna Rizatdinova of Ukraine.

2015

Halkina's first competition of the year was at the 2015 L.A. Lights where she won the all-around bronze medal behind Belarusian teammate Melitina Staniouta. On March 14–15, Halkina competed at the 2015 Baltic Hoop finishing 7th in all-around and taking silver in ribbon and bronze in clubs finals. Her next event was at the 2015 Thiais Grand Prix where she finished 13th in the all-around and qualified to 1 event final finishing 5th in ribbon. On March 27–29, Halkina then competed at the 2015 Lisboa World Cup finishing 6th in all-around, she qualified to all 4 event finals: bronze (hoop, clubs), and 4th in (ball, ribbon). On April 10–12, Halkina placed 7th in all-around at the 2015 Pesaro World Cup and qualified to 3 apparatus finals.

Halkina and teammate Melitina Staniouta represented Belarus at the 2015 European Championships, where she won 3 medals: team silver and 2 individual bronzes for hoop and clubs. Halkina then competed at the 2015 Holon Grand Prix where she finished 16th in all-around after a drop and roll out of carpet from her hoop apparatus. She qualified to 3 event finals: placing 4th in clubs, ball and ribbon. On May 22–24, Halkina competed at the 2015 Tashkent World Cup finishing 5th in the all-around with a total of 70.400 points. She qualified to 3 apparatus finals: she won silver in clubs and 2 bronze in ribbon, ball. Halkina finished 11th in all-around at the 2015 Grand Prix Berlin, she qualified to 2 event finals: won bronze in ribbon (tied with Margarita Mamun) and 4th in ball. On June 15–21, Halkina competed at the inaugural 2015 European Games where she finished 6th in the all-around behind Georgia's Salome Pazhava. Halkina then finished 8th in all-around at the 2015 Summer Universiade, she qualified to 3 apparatus finals placing 4th in clubs, and 8th in ribbon, hoop. In August, Halkina competed at the 2015 Budapest World Cup finishing 6th in all-around behind Ukrainian Ganna Rizatdinova, she qualified to all 4 apparatus finals taking bronze in ribbon, 5th in hoop, and 8th in clubs and ball. In her next competition at the 2015 Sofia World Cup, Halkina finished 9th in the all-around behind Marina Durunda of Azerbaijan. She qualified to 2 apparatus finals finishing 6th in ball and 8th in ribbon. At the 2015 World Cup series in Kazan, Halkina finished 12th in the all-around after a disastrous ball routine, she qualified to 3 apparatus finals finishing 6th in hoop, 5th in clubs, 4th in ribbon.

On September 9–13, Halkina (together with teammates Melitina Staniouta, Hanna Bazhko and Arina Charopa) competed at the 2015 World Championships in Stuttgart, with Team Belarus winning the silver. Halkina qualified to 1 apparatus final finishing 8th in ball. and in the all-around finals; she finished in 13th place behind Kseniya Moustafaeva of France.

2016

In 2016, Halkina started her season at the 2016 L.A. Lights where she won the all-around silver medal behind Ukrainian Ganna Rizatdinova. She then finished 12th in the all-around at the 2016 Grand Prix Moscow. On February 26–28, she competed at the 2016 Espoo World Cup finishing 7th in the all-around with a total of 70.350 points. On March 12–13, Halkina competed at the MTM Tournament in Ljubljana, Slovenia finishing 5th in the all-around with a total of 70.300 points, At the 30th Thiais Grand Prix event in Paris, Halkina finished 6th in the all-around and qualified for 3 apparatus finals. On April 1–3, Halkina competed at the 2016 Pesaro World Cup where she finished 13th in the all-around and qualified for hoop, ball finals. On May 14–16, Halkina then finished 5th in the all-around with a total of 72.700 points at the 2016 Grand Prix Bucharest behind Georgia's Salome Pazhava, she qualified to all apparatus finals and won bronze in ball (tied with Dina Averina). She finished 4th in the all-around at the 2016 Minsk World Cup and qualified to all 4 apparatus finals, finishing (4th in hoop, clubs, ribbon) and 8th in ball. Halkina finished 11th in the all-around at the 2016 Guadalajara World Cup and qualified to 3 apparatus finals.

On June 17–19, Halkina competed at the 2016 European Championships where she finished in 11th place with a total of 71.156 points. On July 1–3, Halkina competed at the 2016 Berlin World Cup winning the All-around bronze with a total of 73.150 (tied with Salome Pazhava), Halkina qualified to all apparatus finals winning bronze in hoop and clubs, 4th in ball and 8th in ribbon. On July 8–10, Halkina then finished 6th in the all-around at the 2016 Kazan World Cup with a total of 72.700 points, she finished 4th in hoop, 5th in ball, 6th in clubs and 7th in ribbon finals.

On August 19–20, Halkina competed at the 2016 Summer Olympics held in Rio de Janeiro, Brazil. She qualified to the rhythmic gymnastics individual all-around final where she finished in 6th place with a total of 70.932 points.

On September 9–11, Halkina together with teammates Hanna Bazhko and junior Alina Harnasko represented team Dinamo at the annual 2016 Aeon Cup in Tokyo, where they won the team silver and Halkina finished 4th in the all-around.

2017

In 2017, Halkina competed at the 2017 Grand Prix Moscow finishing 5th in the all-around and qualified to all the apparatus finals. She won bronze medals in hoop, ball and ribbon and placed 4th in clubs. On March 24–26, Halkina then competed at the Thiais Grand Prix where she won the silver medal in the all-around ahead of Russia's Iuliia Bravikova. She qualified to all event finals and finished 4th in hoop and clubs, 6th in ball, and 8th in ribbon. On April 7–9, Halkina competed at the 2017 Pesaro World Cup winning bronze in the all-around, she qualified to all 4 apparatus finals and won 2 medals: silver in clubs and bronze in ball. She then competed at the 2017 Tashkent World Cup finishing 6th in the all-around. She advanced to clubs and ribbon finals however she did not medal in either of them. On May 5–7, Halkina competed at the 2017 Sofia World Cup finishing 5th in the all-around behind teammate Alina Harnasko after a drop in Halkina's ball routine. She qualified in 3 apparatus finals and won silver in ribbon, bronze in hoop and placed 4th in clubs.

Then, Halkina competed at the 2017 European Championships in Budapest and won the team all around silver medal with Alina Harnasko and the junior group. She qualified to the ribbon, ball and hoop finals and did not win any medal due to several mistakes. On July 7–9, Halkina competed at the World Challenge Cup at the 2017 World Challenge Cup Berlin where she won the all-around gold, beating Russians Iuliia Bravikova and Ekaterina Selezneva. She qualified to all the apparatus finals, taking gold in ribbon, 2 bronze medals in clubs and ball and finishing 8th in hoop.

On July 20–22, Halkina competed at the quadrennial event the 2017 World Games held in Wrocław, Poland. She placed 5th in hoop, 4th in clubs and won bronze in ribbon and ball finals. On August 4–6, Halkina competed at the 2017 Minsk World Challenge Cup winning a bronze in the all-around behind teammate Alina Harnasko, she qualified in all 4 apparatus finals taking gold in ball, bronze in hoop, finished 4th in clubs and 6th in ribbon. On August 11–13, Halkina competed at the 2017 Kazan World Challenge Cup and won bronze in the all-around behind Arina Averina, she qualified in all the apparatus finals and won a silver in ball, finished 4th in hoop, clubs and ribbon.

On August 30-September 3, Halkina competed at the 2017 World Championships where she won her first individual medal at a worlds, a silver in clubs with a score of 18.050 points, behind Dina Averina of Russia. She also finished 4th in hoop and 5th in ball finals. Halkina was close to medaling in the all-around; however a mistake with ball took her out of medal contention. She finished 4th with Israel's Linoy Ashram taking the bronze medal. On Sep 29-Oct 1, Halkina then won bronze in the all-around at the Aeon Cup in Tokyo, Japan. On November 5–6, Halkina competed at the Dalia Kutkaite Cup winning the silver medal in all-around with a total of 74.350 points, less than 0.5 behind gold medalist Aleksandra Soldatova.

2018

In 2018, Halkina began the season at the 2018 Grand Prix Moscow finishing 5th in the all-around and qualified to all the apparatus finals. She won gold with ribbon and bronze in hoop and ball with a 4th place in clubs. After skipping a few international events due to a minor injury, Halkina returned in competition at the 2018 Pesaro World Cup finishing 5th in the all-around, she qualified in 3 apparatus finals placing 7th in hoop, ball and 4th in ribbon. On April 27–29, Halkina competed at the 2018 Baku World Cup where she finished 10th in the all-around after a series of mistakes in all her routines. She won a bronze medal in the hoop final behind Russia's Maria Sergeeva. On May 4–6, she finished 7th in all-around at the 2018 Guadalajara World Challenge Cup. She qualified in 3 apparatus finals finishing 6th in ball and 7th in clubs and ribbon. On May 16–17, Halkina competed at the 2018 Holon Grand Prix finishing just out of the medals in the all-around by placing 4th behind Ekaterina Selezneva. She qualified for all apparatus finals and won gold in ball and bronze in hoop. She finished 5th in clubs and 8th in ribbon. In June at the 2018 European Championships Halkina produced what probably was the best, most consistent competition of her life. Hitting one routine after the other she came close to the silver medal but had to settle for bronze medal in the all-around.

==== 2019 ====
In April, Halkina won hoop bronze at the Pesaro World Cup. In September at the World Championships in Baku Halkina, along with Alina Harnasko and Anastasiia Salos, won team bronze.

==== After 2020 ====
Halkina confirmed that she tested positive for COVID-19 on 8 May 2020. She accept surgery to treat right foot in Germany in the same year.

She won all-around silver at the FIG Rhythmic Gymnastics World Cup 2021 in Sofia, Bulgaria.

She announced her retirement on 18 June 2021.

== Routine music information ==
Year	Apparatus	Music title
2021	Hoop	"The Night King" from Game of Thrones by Ramin Djawadi
2021	Ball	"The Chairman's Waltz" from Memoirs of a Geisha by John Williams
2021	Clubs	Vihma by Värttinä
2021	Ribbon	Как молоды мы были (How Young We Were) by Alexander Gradsky
2020	Hoop	"The Night King" from Game of Thrones by Ramin Djawadi
2020	Ball	"The Chairman's Waltz" from Memoirs of a Geisha by John Williams
2020	Clubs	Vihma by Värttinä
2020	Ribbon	Как молоды мы были (How Young We Were) by Alexander Gradsky
2019	Hoop	Freedom by Pharrell Williams
2019	Ball	Vyhozhu Odin Ya Na Dorogu (I go out alone on the road) by Anna German
2019	Clubs	Primavera Portena (Spring in Buenos Aires) by Astor Piazzolla
2019	Ribbon	Danube by Abel Korzeniowski
2019	Gala	Поговори со мной (Talk to me) by Maria Tchaikovskaya
2018	Hoop	Moonlight Rumba (Moonlight Sonata) by Gustavo Montesano, Carlos Gomez, Royal Philharmonic Orchestra
2018	Ball	Elegie Opus 3 No. 1 by Rachmaninoff
2018	Clubs	Down by Kevin K. O. Olusola
2018	Ribbon	Sentimental Waltz (from A Hunting Accident) by Eugen Doga
2018	Gala	Revolving Door by Abel Korzeniowski
2017	Hoop	Забери Меня (Take Me) by Maria Tchaikovskaya
2017	Ball	Glinka (la separation) nocturne in F minor by Ensemble of Soloists Concertino, Victor Kozodov
2017	Clubs	Becoming a Geisha music from Memoirs of a Geisha by John Williams
2017	Ribbon	Song for the Little Sparrow by Abel Korzeniowski
2017	Gala	One Dove by Antony & The Johnsons
2016	Hoop	Ondeia by Dulce Pontes
2016	Ball	Carol Of The Bells by The Piano Guys
2016	Clubs	Leningrad by William Joseph
2016	Ribbon	Tchiki Tchiki Tchiki by Little Barrie, Make the Girl Dance
2016	Gala	Забери Меня(Take Me) by Maria Tchaikovskaya
2015	Hoop	Architect of the mind by Kerry Muzzey
2015	Ball	Stella's Theme by William Joseph
2015	Clubs	La Alegria by Yasmin Levy
2015	Ribbon	Beethoven Scherzo by David Garrett
2015	Gala	Lose Yourself by Eminem
2014	Hoop	Black Orpheus by Aziza Mustafa Zadeh
2014	Ball	Charms by Abel Korzeniowski
2014	Clubs	Swing Baby by Park Jin-young
2014	Ribbon	Beethoven Scherzo by David Garrett
2013	Hoop	Black Orpheus by Aziza Mustafa Zadeh
2013	Ball	La Cumparsita by Ensemble Contraste
2013	Clubs	Swing Baby by Park Jin-young
2013	Ribbon	Spanish Dance by Taro Hakase
2012	Hoop	?
2012	Ball	Bellini Portreyi Yaparken by Can Atilla
2012	Clubs	?
2012	Ribbon	Romance by Georgy Sviridov
