= 2016 Asian Rhythmic Gymnastics Championships =

International rhythmic gymnastics competition

The 8th Rhythmic Gymnastics Asian Championships was held in Tashkent, Uzbekistan from 8–10 May 2016.

== Medal winners ==
Event	Gold	Silver	Bronze
All-around Finals
Individual	Son Yeon-Jae; South Korea	Elizaveta Nazarenkova; Uzbekistan	Sabina Ashirbayeva; Kazakhstan
Apparatus Finals
Hoop	Son Yeon-Jae; South Korea	Sabina Ashirbayeva; Kazakhstan	Elizaveta Nazarenkova; Uzbekistan
Ball	Son Yeon-Jae; South Korea	Kaho Minagawa; Japan	Elizaveta Nazarenkova; Uzbekistan
Clubs	Son Yeon-Jae; South Korea	Elizaveta Nazarenkova; Uzbekistan	Sabina Ashirbayeva; Kazakhstan
Ribbon	Son Yeon-Jae; South Korea	Sabina Ashirbayeva; Kazakhstan	Elizaveta Nazarenkova; Uzbekistan
Group Finals
Group All-around	Japan	China	Kazakhstan
5 Ribbons	China	Japan	Kazakhstan
6 Clubs + 2 Hoops	Japan	China	North Korea

== Medal table ==
Rank	Nation	Gold	Silver	Bronze	Total
1	South Korea (KOR)	5	0	0	5
2	Japan (JPN)	2	2	0	4
3	China (CHN)	1	2	0	3
4	Kazakhstan (KAZ)	0	2	4	6
5	Uzbekistan (UZB)	0	2	3	5
6	North Korea (PRK)	0	0	1	1
Totals (6 entries)		8	8	8	24
