= 2016 FIG Rhythmic Gymnastics World Cup series =

International rhythm gymnastics competition

The 2016 FIG World Cup circuit in Rhythmic Gymnastics includes ten category B events.

With nine stopovers in Europe and one in Asia, the competitions are slated for February 26–28 in Espoo (FIN), March 17–20 in Lisbon (POR), April 1–3 in Pesaro (ITA), May 13–15 in Tashkent (UZB), May 20–22 in Minsk (BLR), May 27–29 in Sofia (BUL), June 3–5 in Guadalajara (ESP), July 1–3 in Berlin (GER), July 9–10 in Kazan (RUS), and July 22–24 in Baku (AZE).

The world ranking points collected by the competitors at their best four World Cup events will add up to a total, and the top scorers in each discipline will be crowned winners of the overall series at the final event in Baku, Azerbaijan.

== Formats ==
Date	Levels	Location	Type
February 26–28	Cat. B	(Finland) Espoo	Individuals & Groups
March 17–20	Cat. B	(Portugal) Lisbon	Individuals & Groups
April 1–3	Cat. B	(Italy) Pesaro	Individuals & Groups
May 13–15	Cat. B	(Uzbekistan) Tashkent	Individuals & Groups
May 20–22	Cat. B	(Belarus) Minsk	Individuals & Groups
May 27–29	Cat. B	(Bulgaria) Sofia	Individuals & Groups
June 3–5	Cat. B	(Spain) Guadalajara	Individuals & Groups
July 1–3	Cat. B	(Germany) Berlin	Individuals & Groups
July 9–10	Cat. B	(Russia) Kazan	Individuals & Groups
July 22–24	Cat. B	(Azerbaijan) Baku	Individuals & Groups

== Medal winners ==
=== All-around ===
==== Individual ====
Competitions	Gold	Silver	Bronze
Category B
Espoo	(Russia) Aleksandra Soldatova	(South Korea) Son Yeon-Jae	(Ukraine) Ganna Rizatdinova
Lisbon	(Russia) Aleksandra Soldatova	(Ukraine) Ganna Rizatdinova	(Israel) Neta Rivkin
Pesaro	(Russia) Yana Kudryavtseva	(Russia) Margarita Mamun	(Ukraine) Ganna Rizatdinova
Tashkent	(Russia) Yana Kudryavtseva	(Russia) Aleksandra Soldatova	(Israel) Linoy Ashram
Minsk	(Russia) Margarita Mamun	(Russia) Aleksandra Soldatova	(Belarus) Melitina Staniouta
Sofia	(Russia) Yana Kudryavtseva	(Ukraine) Ganna Rizatdinova	(South Korea) Son Yeon-Jae
Guadalajara	(Russia) Margarita Mamun	(Russia) Aleksandra Soldatova	(Ukraine) Ganna Rizatdinova
Berlin	(Russia) Dina Averina	(Belarus) Melitina Staniouta	(Georgia (country)) Salome Pazhava
Berlin	(Russia) Dina Averina	(Belarus) Melitina Staniouta	(Belarus) Katsiaryna Halkina
Kazan	(Russia) Margarita Mamun	(Russia) Yana Kudryavtseva	(Russia) Aleksandra Soldatova
Baku	(Russia) Margarita Mamun	(Russia) Yana Kudryavtseva	(Russia) Aleksandra Soldatova

==== Group all-around ====
Competitions	Gold	Silver	Bronze
Category B
Espoo	Russia	Israel	Spain
Lisbon	Russia	Israel	Bulgaria
Lisbon	Russia	Israel	Spain
Pesaro	Italy	Bulgaria	Israel
Tashkent	Russia	Belarus	Israel
Minsk	Belarus	Russia	Israel
Sofia	Russia	Bulgaria	Belarus
Guadalajara	Spain	Belarus	Ukraine
Berlin	Japan	Finland	None Awarded
Berlin	Japan	Ukraine	None Awarded
Kazan	Russia	Belarus	Israel
Baku	Russia	Israel	Italy

=== Apparatus ===
==== Hoop ====
Competitions	Gold	Silver	Bronze
Category B
Espoo	(Ukraine) Ganna Rizatdinova	(Russia) Aleksandra Soldatova	(South Korea) Son Yeon-Jae
Lisbon	(Russia) Aleksandra Soldatova	(Ukraine) Ganna Rizatdinova	(South Korea) Son Yeon-Jae
Pesaro	(Russia) Margarita Mamun	(Ukraine) Ganna Rizatdinova	(Russia) Dina Averina
Tashkent	(Russia) Yana Kudryavtseva	(Russia) Aleksandra Soldatova	(Israel) Neta Rivkin
Minsk	(Russia) Margarita Mamun	(Belarus) Melitina Staniouta	(United States) Laura Zeng
Sofia	(Ukraine) Ganna Rizatdinova	(South Korea) Son Yeon-Jae	(Russia) Arina Averina
Guadalajara	(Russia) Margarita Mamun	(Russia) Aleksandra Soldatova	(Ukraine) Ganna Rizatdinova
Berlin	(Belarus) Melitina Staniouta	None Awarded	(Belarus) Katsiaryna Halkina
Berlin	(Ukraine) Ganna Rizatdinova	None Awarded	(Belarus) Katsiaryna Halkina
Kazan	(Russia) Yana Kudryavtseva	(South Korea) Son Yeon-Jae	(Russia) Margarita Mamun
Baku	(Russia) Yana Kudryavtseva	(Russia) Margarita Mamun	(France) Kseniya Moustafaeva

==== Ball ====
Competitions	Gold	Silver	Bronze
Category B
Espoo	(South Korea) Son Yeon-Jae	(Russia) Dina Averina	(Ukraine) Ganna Rizatdinova
Lisbon	(Russia) Aleksandra Soldatova	(South Korea) Son Yeon-Jae	(Israel) Neta Rivkin
Pesaro	(Ukraine) Ganna Rizatdinova	(Russia) Dina Averina	None Awarded
Pesaro	(Ukraine) Ganna Rizatdinova	(Belarus) Melitina Staniouta	None Awarded
Tashkent	(Russia) Yana Kudryavtseva	(Israel) Neta Rivkin	(Uzbekistan) Anastasiya Serdyukova
Tashkent	(Russia) Yana Kudryavtseva	(Israel) Neta Rivkin	(Israel) Linoy Ashram
Minsk	(Russia) Margarita Mamun	(Russia) Aleksandra Soldatova	(Belarus) Melitina Staniouta
Sofia	(Russia) Yana Kudryavtseva	(Ukraine) Ganna Rizatdinova	(South Korea) Son Yeon-Jae
Guadalajara	(Russia) Aleksandra Soldatova	(Ukraine) Ganna Rizatdinova	(South Korea) Son Yeon-Jae
Berlin	(Russia) Dina Averina	(Belarus) Melitina Staniouta	(Georgia (country)) Salome Pazhava
Kazan	(Russia) Yana Kudryavtseva	(Russia) Margarita Mamun	(Belarus) Melitina Staniouta
Baku	(Russia) Margarita Mamun	(Russia) Aleksandra Soldatova	(Israel) Neta Rivkin

==== Clubs ====
Competitions	Gold	Silver	Bronze
Category B
Espoo	(Russia) Aleksandra Soldatova	(Ukraine) Ganna Rizatdinova	(Belarus) Melitina Staniouta
Lisbon	(Ukraine) Ganna Rizatdinova	(South Korea) Son Yeon-Jae	(Russia) Aleksandra Soldatova
Pesaro	(Russia) Margarita Mamun	(South Korea) Son Yeon-Jae	(Russia) Dina Averina
Tashkent	(Russia) Yana Kudryavtseva	(Russia) Aleksandra Soldatova	(Uzbekistan) Elizaveta Nazarenkova
Minsk	(Russia) Margarita Mamun	(Russia) Aleksandra Soldatova	(Belarus) Melitina Staniouta
Sofia	(South Korea) Son Yeon-Jae	(Ukraine) Ganna Rizatdinova	(Russia) Arina Averina
Guadalajara	(Russia) Margarita Mamun	(Russia) Aleksandra Soldatova	(Ukraine) Ganna Rizatdinova
Berlin	(Ukraine) Ganna Rizatdinova	(Belarus) Melitina Staniouta	(Belarus) Katsiaryna Halkina
Kazan	(Russia) Margarita Mamun	(Russia) Aleksandra Soldatova	(Belarus) Melitina Staniouta
Baku	(Russia) Yana Kudryavtseva	None Awarded	(France) Kseniya Moustafaeva
Baku	(Russia) Margarita Mamun	None Awarded	(France) Kseniya Moustafaeva

==== Ribbon ====
Competitions	Gold	Silver	Bronze
Category B
Espoo	(Ukraine) Ganna Rizatdinova	(South Korea) Son Yeon-Jae	(Russia) Aleksandra Soldatova
Espoo	(Ukraine) Ganna Rizatdinova	(South Korea) Son Yeon-Jae	(Belarus) Melitina Staniouta
Lisbon	(Ukraine) Ganna Rizatdinova	(Russia) Aleksandra Soldatova	None Awarded
Lisbon	(Ukraine) Ganna Rizatdinova	(Russia) Arina Averina	None Awarded
Pesaro	(Ukraine) Ganna Rizatdinova	(Russia) Dina Averina	None Awarded
Pesaro	(Ukraine) Ganna Rizatdinova	(South Korea) Son Yeon-Jae	None Awarded
Tashkent	(Russia) Yana Kudryavtseva	(Russia) Aleksandra Soldatova	(Uzbekistan) Anastasiya Serdyukova
Minsk	(Russia) Margarita Mamun	(Russia) Aleksandra Soldatova	(United States) Laura Zeng
Sofia	(Russia) Yana Kudryavtseva	(South Korea) Son Yeon-Jae	(Bulgaria) Neviana Vladinova
Guadalajara	(Russia) Margarita Mamun	(Belarus) Melitina Staniouta	(Russia) Aleksandra Soldatova
Berlin	(Russia) Dina Averina	(Ukraine) Ganna Rizatdinova	(Georgia (country)) Salome Pazhava
Berlin	(Russia) Dina Averina	(Ukraine) Ganna Rizatdinova	(Belarus) Melitina Staniouta
Kazan	(Russia) Margarita Mamun	(Belarus) Melitina Staniouta	(South Korea) Son Yeon-Jae
Baku	(Russia) Margarita Mamun	None Awarded	(Azerbaijan) Marina Durunda
Baku	(Russia) Yana Kudryavtseva	None Awarded	(Azerbaijan) Marina Durunda

==== 5 Ribbons ====
Competitions	Gold	Silver	Bronze
Category B
Espoo	Spain	Israel	Ukraine
Lisbon	Russia	Bulgaria	None Awarded
Lisbon	Russia	Israel	None Awarded
Pesaro	Italy	Israel	Bulgaria
Tashkent	Russia	Belarus	Spain
Minsk	Russia	Belarus	Israel
Sofia	Bulgaria	Russia	Belarus
Guadalajara	Belarus	Bulgaria	Spain
Berlin	Japan	Finland	Germany
Kazan	Bulgaria	Russia	Israel
Baku	Israel	Russia	Spain

==== 2 Hoops and 6 Clubs ====
Competitions	Gold	Silver	Bronze
Category B
Espoo	Israel	Spain	Ukraine
Lisbon	Russia	Bulgaria	Spain
Pesaro	Italy	Belarus	Israel
Tashkent	Belarus	Spain	Russia
Minsk	Belarus	Italy	Israel
Sofia	Bulgaria	Belarus	Italy
Guadalajara	Belarus	Bulgaria	Spain
Berlin	Ukraine	Germany	Finland
Kazan	Russia	Belarus	Italy
Baku	Russia	Italy	Spain

== Overall medal table ==
Rank	Nation	Gold	Silver	Bronze	Total
1	Russia (RUS)	53	28	11	92
2	Ukraine (UKR)	10	10	9	29
3	Belarus (BLR)	5	15	13	33
4	Bulgaria (BUL)	3	6	3	12
5	Italy (ITA)	3	2	3	8
6	South Korea (KOR)	2	9	6	17
7	Israel (ISR)	2	7	14	23
8	Spain (ESP)	2	2	8	12
9	Japan (JPN)	2	0	0	2
10	Finland (FIN)	0	2	1	3
11	Germany (GER)	0	1	1	2
12	Georgia (GEO)	0	0	3	3
12	Uzbekistan (UZB)	0	0	3	3
14	France (FRA)	0	0	2	2
14	United States (USA)	0	0	2	2
16	Azerbaijan (AZE)	0	0	1	1
Totals (16 entries)		82	82	80	244

== See also ==
- 2016 FIG Artistic Gymnastics World Cup series
- 2016 Rhythmic Gymnastics Grand Prix circuit
