= 2015 FIG Rhythmic Gymnastics World Cup series =

International rhythm gymnastics competition

The 2015 FIG World Cup circuit in Rhythmic Gymnastics includes seven category B events. Except for Bucharest, which is a competition for individuals only, all tournaments feature Individual and Group competitions. The All-around medal event also serves as qualification for the apparatus finals.

With six stopovers in Europe and one in Asia, the competitions took place on March 26–29 in Lisbon (POR), April 3–5 in Bucharest (ROU), April 10 – 12 in Pesaro (ITA), May 22 – 24 in Tashkent (UZB), August 7 – 9 in Budapest (HUN), August 14–16 in Sofia (BUL), and August 21–23 in Kazan (RUS).

The world ranking points collected by the competitors at their best four World Cup events added up to a total, and the top scorers in each discipline were crowned winners of the overall series at the final event in Kazan, Russia.

== Formats ==
Date	Levels	Location	Type
March 26–29	Cat. B	(Portugal) Lisbon	Individuals & Groups
April 3–5	Cat. B	(Romania) Bucharest	Individuals
April 10–12	Cat. B	(Italy) Pesaro	Individuals & Groups
May 22–24	Cat. B	(Uzbekistan) Tashkent	Individuals & Groups
August 7–9	Cat. B	(Hungary) Budapest	Individuals & Groups
August 15–16	Cat. B	(Bulgaria) Sofia	Individuals & Groups
August 21–23	Cat. B	(Russia) Kazan	Individuals & Groups

== Medal winners ==
=== All-around ===
==== Individual ====
Competitions	Gold	Silver	Bronze
Category B
Lisbon	(Russia) Aleksandra Soldatova	(Russia) Margarita Mamun	(Russia) Yana Kudryavtseva
Bucharest	(Russia) Yana Kudryavtseva	(Russia) Margarita Mamun	(Belarus) Melitina Staniouta
Pesaro	(Russia) Yana Kudryavtseva	(Russia) Margarita Mamun	(Russia) Aleksandra Soldatova
Tashkent	(Russia) Margarita Mamun	(Russia) Aleksandra Soldatova	(South Korea) Son Yeon-Jae
Budapest	(Russia) Yana Kudryavtseva	(Russia) Margarita Mamun	(Belarus) Melitina Staniouta
Sofia	(Russia) Yana Kudryavtseva	(Russia) Margarita Mamun	(Ukraine) Ganna Rizatdinova
Kazan	(Russia) Margarita Mamun	(Russia) Yana Kudryavtseva	(Russia) Aleksandra Soldatova

==== Group all-around ====
Competitions	Gold	Silver	Bronze
Category B
Lisbon	Italy	Israel	Spain
Pesaro	Russia	Italy	Spain
Tashkent	Bulgaria	Spain	Israel
Budapest	Russia	Israel	Italy
Sofia	Russia	Bulgaria	Belarus
Kazan	Russia	Belarus	Bulgaria
Kazan	Russia	Belarus	Israel

=== Apparatus ===
==== Hoop ====
Competitions	Gold	Silver	Bronze
Category B
Lisbon	(Russia) Margarita Mamun	(South Korea) Son Yeon-Jae	(Belarus) Katsiaryna Halkina
Bucharest	(Russia) Yana Kudryavtseva	(Russia) Margarita Mamun	(Belarus) Melitina Staniouta
Pesaro	(Russia) Margarita Mamun	(Russia) Yana Kudryavtseva	(Belarus) Melitina Staniouta
Tashkent	(Russia) Margarita Mamun	(Russia) Aleksandra Soldatova	(South Korea) Son Yeon-Jae
Budapest	(Russia) Yana Kudryavtseva	(Russia) Margarita Mamun	(Belarus) Melitina Staniouta
Sofia	(Russia) Yana Kudryavtseva	(Russia) Margarita Mamun	(Belarus) Melitina Staniouta
Sofia	(Russia) Yana Kudryavtseva	(Russia) Margarita Mamun	(Ukraine) Ganna Rizatdinova
Kazan	(Russia) Margarita Mamun	(Russia) Aleksandra Soldatova	(South Korea) Son Yeon-Jae

==== Ball ====
Competitions	Gold	Silver	Bronze
Category B
Lisbon	(Russia) Margarita Mamun	(Russia) Aleksandra Soldatova	(Azerbaijan) Marina Durunda
Bucharest	(Russia) Yana Kudryavtseva	(Russia) Margarita Mamun	(Belarus) Melitina Staniouta
Pesaro	(Russia) Aleksandra Soldatova	(Belarus) Melitina Staniouta	(Russia) Margarita Mamun
Tashkent	(Russia) Margarita Mamun	(Russia) Aleksandra Soldatova	(Belarus) Katsiaryna Halkina
Budapest	(Russia) Yana Kudryavtseva	(Russia) Margarita Mamun	(Belarus) Melitina Staniouta
Sofia	(Russia) Yana Kudryavtseva	(Belarus) Melitina Staniouta	(Ukraine) Ganna Rizatdinova
Kazan	(Russia) Margarita Mamun	(Russia) Aleksandra Soldatova	(Belarus) Melitina Staniouta

==== Clubs ====
Competitions	Gold	Silver	Bronze
Category B
Lisbon	(Russia) Aleksandra Soldatova	(Russia) Yana Kudryavtseva	(Belarus) Katsiaryna Halkina
Bucharest	(Russia) Yana Kudryavtseva	(Russia) Aleksandra Soldatova	(France) Kseniya Moustafaeva
Pesaro	(Russia) Yana Kudryavtseva	(Russia) Margarita Mamun	(Ukraine) Ganna Rizatdinova
Tashkent	(Russia) Margarita Mamun	(Belarus) Katsiaryna Halkina	(Uzbekistan) Anastasiya Serdyukova
Budapest	(Russia) Margarita Mamun	(Ukraine) Ganna Rizatdinova	(Belarus) Melitina Staniouta
Sofia	(Russia) Yana Kudryavtseva	(Russia) Aleksandra Soldatova	(Ukraine) Ganna Rizatdinova
Kazan	(Russia) Margarita Mamun	(Russia) Aleksandra Soldatova	(Georgia (country)) Salome Pazhava

==== Ribbon ====
Competitions	Gold	Silver	Bronze
Category B
Lisbon	(Russia) Margarita Mamun	(Israel) Neta Rivkin	(Azerbaijan) Marina Durunda
Bucharest	(Russia) Yana Kudryavtseva	(Russia) Aleksandra Soldatova	(Belarus) Melitina Staniouta
Bucharest	(Russia) Yana Kudryavtseva	(Russia) Aleksandra Soldatova	(Azerbaijan) Marina Durunda
Pesaro	(Russia) Yana Kudryavtseva	(Ukraine) Ganna Rizatdinova	(Belarus) Melitina Staniouta
Pesaro	(Russia) Yana Kudryavtseva	(Ukraine) Ganna Rizatdinova	(Russia) Aleksandra Soldatova
Tashkent	(Russia) Margarita Mamun	(Russia) Aleksandra Soldatova	(Belarus) Katsiaryna Halkina
Budapest	(Ukraine) Ganna Rizatdinova	(Russia) Margarita Mamun	(Belarus) Katsiaryna Halkina
Sofia	(Russia) Yana Kudryavtseva	(Russia) Margarita Mamun	(Ukraine) Ganna Rizatdinova
Kazan	(Russia) Margarita Mamun	(Russia) Aleksandra Soldatova	(Belarus) Melitina Staniouta

==== 5 Ribbons ====
Competitions	Gold	Silver	Bronze
Category B
Lisbon	Russia	Israel	Japan
Pesaro	Israel	Ukraine	Bulgaria
Tashkent	Israel	Bulgaria	Belarus
Budapest	Russia	Belarus	Israel
Sofia	Russia	Bulgaria	Israel
Kazan	Russia	Bulgaria	Japan
Kazan	Russia	Bulgaria	Belarus

==== 2 Hoops and 6 Clubs ====
Competitions	Gold	Silver	Bronze
Category B
Lisbon	Italy	Bulgaria	Israel
Lisbon	Italy	Bulgaria	Spain
Pesaro	Italy	Belarus	Israel
Tashkent	Bulgaria	Spain	Belarus
Tashkent	Bulgaria	Spain	Italy
Budapest	Italy	Belarus	Russia
Sofia	Russia	Israel	None awarded
Sofia	Russia	Bulgaria	None awarded
Kazan	Russia	Belarus	Bulgaria

== Overall medal table ==
Rank	Nation	Gold	Silver	Bronze	Total
1	Russia (RUS)	44	28	6	78
2	Italy (ITA)	4	1	2	7
3	Bulgaria (BUL)	2	6	3	11
4	Israel (ISR)	2	5	6	13
5	Ukraine (UKR)	1	3	6	10
6	Belarus (BLR)	0	8	22	30
7	Spain (ESP)	0	2	3	5
8	South Korea (KOR)	0	1	3	4
9	Azerbaijan (AZE)	0	0	3	3
10	Japan (JPN)	0	0	2	2
11	France (FRA)	0	0	1	1
11	Georgia (GEO)	0	0	1	1
11	Uzbekistan (UZB)	0	0	1	1
Totals (13 entries)		53	54	59	166

== See also ==
- 2015 FIG Artistic Gymnastics World Cup series
- 2015 Rhythmic Gymnastics Grand Prix circuit
