= 2014 FIG Rhythmic Gymnastics World Cup series =

International rhythm gymnastics competition

The 2014 FIG World Cup circuit in Rhythmic Gymnastics includes one category A event (Stuttgart) and eight category B events. Except for Corbeil-Essones, which is a competition for individuals only, all tournaments feature Individual and Group competitions. The All-around medal event also serves as qualification for the apparatus finals.

With eight stopovers in Europe and one in Asia, the competitions took place on March 14 – 16 in Debrecen (HUN), March 22 – 23 in Stuttgart (GER), April 3 – 6 in Lisbon (POR), April 11 – 13 in Pesaro (ITA), May 9 – 11 in Corbeil-Essonnes (FRA), May 22 – 24 in Tashkent (UZB), May 30 – June 1 in Minsk (BLR), August 9 – 10 in Sofia (BUL), and September 5 – 7 in Kazan (RUS).

The world ranking points collected by the competitors at their best four World Cup events added up to a total, and the top scorers in each discipline were crowned winners of the overall series at the final event in Kazan, Russia.

Yana Kudryavtseva became the all-around winner at the last stage of the World Cup Series ahead of teammate Margarita Mamun, who took the all-around silver. Melitina Staniouta of Belarus won the all-around bronze medal. Katsiaryna Halkina of Belarus finished 4th, and Son Yeon-Jae of South Korea, 5th.

== Formats ==
Date	Levels	Location	Type
14–16 March 2014	Cat. B	(Hungary) Debrecen	Individuals & Groups
22–23 March 2014	Cat. A	(Germany) Stuttgart	Individuals & Groups
3–6 April 2014	Cat. B	(Portugal) Lisbon	Individuals & Groups
11–13 April 2014	Cat. B	(Italy) Pesaro	Individuals & Groups
9–11 May 2014	Cat. B	(France) Corbeil-Essonnes	Individuals
22–24 May 2014	Cat. B	(Uzbekistan) Tashkent	Individuals & Groups
30 May–1 June 2014	Cat. B	(Belarus) Minsk	Individuals & Groups
9–10 August 2014	Cat. B	(Bulgaria) Sofia	Individuals & Groups
5–7 September 2014	Cat. B	(Russia) Kazan	Individuals & Groups

== Medal winners ==
=== All-around ===
==== Individual ====
Competitions	Gold	Silver	Bronze
Category A
Stuttgart	(Russia) Yana Kudryavtseva	(Russia) Margarita Mamun	(Russia) Maria Titova
Category B
Debrecen	(Russia) Aleksandra Soldatova	(Ukraine) Ganna Rizatdinova	(Russia) Elizaveta Nazarenkova
Lisbon	(South Korea) Son Yeon-Jae	(Belarus) Melitina Staniouta	(Russia) Dina Averina
Pesaro	(Russia) Yana Kudryavtseva	(Russia) Margarita Mamun	(Ukraine) Ganna Rizatdinova
Corbeil-Essonnes	(Russia) Margarita Mamun	(Russia) Yana Kudryavtseva	(Ukraine) Ganna Rizatdinova
Tashkent	(Russia) Margarita Mamun	(Russia) Yana Kudryavtseva	(Russia) Aleksandra Soldatova
Minsk	(Russia) Yana Kudryavtseva	(Belarus) Melitina Staniouta	(Russia) Margarita Mamun
Sofia	(Russia) Yana Kudryavtseva	(Russia) Margarita Mamun	(South Korea) Son Yeon-Jae
Kazan	(Russia) Yana Kudryavtseva	(Russia) Margarita Mamun	(Belarus) Melitina Staniouta

==== Group all-around ====
Competitions	Gold	Silver	Bronze
Category A
Stuttgart	Russia	Italy	Bulgaria
Category B
Debrecen	Azerbaijan	China	Israel
Lisbon	Spain	Azerbaijan	Japan
Lisbon	Spain	Azerbaijan	Ukraine
Pesaro	Italy	Belarus	Bulgaria
Tashkent	Russia	Israel	Azerbaijan
Minsk	Bulgaria	Spain	Japan
Minsk	Bulgaria	Spain	Israel
Sofia	Russia	Bulgaria	Italy
Kazan	Russia	Belarus	Spain

=== Apparatus ===
==== Hoop ====
Competitions	Gold	Silver	Bronze
Category A
Stuttgart	(Russia) Yana Kudryavtseva	Not awarded	(Belarus) Melitina Staniouta
Stuttgart	(Russia) Margarita Mamun	Not awarded	(Belarus) Melitina Staniouta
Category B
Debrecen	(Azerbaijan) Marina Durunda	(Ukraine) Viktoria Mazur	(Russia) Aleksandra Soldatova
Lisbon	(Belarus) Melitina Staniouta	(Russia) Maria Titova	(South Korea) Son Yeon-Jae
Pesaro	(Russia) Yana Kudryavtseva	(Russia) Margarita Mamun	(Ukraine) Ganna Rizatdinova
Corbeil-Essonnes	(Ukraine) Ganna Rizatdinova	(Russia) Yana Kudryavtseva	(France) Kseniya Moustafaeva
Tashkent	(Russia) Yana Kudryavtseva	(Belarus) Melitina Staniouta	(Israel) Neta Rivkin
Minsk	(Russia) Yana Kudryavtseva	(South Korea) Son Yeon-Jae	(Azerbaijan) Marina Durunda
Sofia	(Russia) Yana Kudryavtseva	(Belarus) Melitina Staniouta	(South Korea) Son Yeon-jae
Kazan	(Russia) Margarita Mamun	(Russia) Yana Kudryavtseva	(South Korea) Son Yeon-jae

==== Ball ====
Competitions	Gold	Silver	Bronze
Category A
Stuttgart	(Russia) Yana Kudryavtseva	(Belarus) Melitina Staniouta	(Russia) Margarita Mamun
Stuttgart	(Russia) Yana Kudryavtseva	(Belarus) Melitina Staniouta	(Ukraine) Ganna Rizatdinova
Category B
Debrecen	(Ukraine) Ganna Rizatdinova	(Russia) Aleksandra Soldatova	(Belarus) Katsiaryna Halkina
Lisbon	(South Korea) Son Yeon-Jae	(Belarus) Melitina Staniouta	(Azerbaijan) Marina Durunda
Pesaro	(Russia) Yana Kudryavtseva	(Russia) Margarita Mamun	(South Korea) Son Yeon-Jae
Corbeil-Essonnes	(Ukraine) Ganna Rizatdinova	(Russia) Aleksandra Soldatova	Not awarded
Corbeil-Essonnes	(Ukraine) Ganna Rizatdinova	(Belarus) Katsiaryna Halkina	Not awarded
Tashkent	(Russia) Yana Kudryavtseva	(Russia) Margarita Mamun	(Belarus) Melitina Staniouta
Minsk	(Russia) Yana Kudryavtseva	(Russia) Margarita Mamun	(Belarus) Melitina Staniouta
Sofia	(Russia) Yana Kudryavtseva	(Russia) Margarita Mamun	(South Korea) Son Yeon-Jae
Kazan	(Russia) Yana Kudryavtseva	(Russia) Margarita Mamun	(Belarus) Melitina Staniouta

==== Clubs ====
Competitions	Gold	Silver	Bronze
Category A
Stuttgart	(Russia) Yana Kudryavtseva	Not awarded	(Belarus) Melitina Staniouta
Stuttgart	(Russia) Margarita Mamun	Not awarded	(Belarus) Melitina Staniouta
Category B
Debrecen	(Russia) Aleksandra Soldatova	(Ukraine) Ganna Rizatdinova	(Russia) Elizaveta Nazarenkova
Lisbon	(South Korea) Son Yeon-Jae	(Russia) Dina Averina	(Spain) Carolina Rodriguez
Pesaro	(Russia) Yana Kudryavtseva	(South Korea) Son Yeon-Jae	(Belarus) Melitina Staniouta
Corbeil-Essonnes	(Russia) Margarita Mamun	(Russia) Yana Kudryavtseva	(China) Deng Senyue
Tashkent	(Russia) Margarita Mamun	(Belarus) Melitina Staniouta	(Uzbekistan) Elizaveta Nazarenkova
Tashkent	(Russia) Margarita Mamun	(Belarus) Melitina Staniouta	(Azerbaijan) Marina Durunda
Minsk	(Russia) Yana Kudryavtseva	(Russia) Margarita Mamun	(Belarus) Melitina Staniouta
Sofia	(Russia) Yana Kudryavtseva	(Russia) Margarita Mamun	(Belarus) Katsiaryna Halkina
Kazan	(Russia) Yana Kudryavtseva	(Belarus) Melitina Staniouta	(Belarus) Katsiaryna Halkina

==== Ribbon ====
Competitions	Gold	Silver	Bronze
Category A
Stuttgart	(Russia) Margarita Mamun	(South Korea) Son Yeon-Jae	(Belarus) Melitina Staniouta
Category B
Debrecen	(Russia) Aleksandra Soldatova	(Russia) Elizaveta Nazarenkova	(Belarus) Arina Charopa
Lisbon	(South Korea) Son Yeon-Jae	(Belarus) Arina Charopa	(Russia) Dina Averina
Pesaro	(Russia) Yana Kudryavtseva	(Russia) Maria Titova	(Ukraine) Ganna Rizatdinova
Corbeil-Essonnes	(Russia) Yana Kudryavtseva	(Russia) Margarita Mamun	(Ukraine) Ganna Rizatdinova
Tashkent	(Russia) Margarita Mamun	(Belarus) Melitina Staniouta	(Azerbaijan) Marina Durunda
Minsk	(Belarus) Melitina Staniouta	(Russia) Margarita Mamun	(South Korea) Son Yeon-Jae
Sofia	(Russia) Yana Kudryavtseva	(Belarus) Melitina Staniouta	(Russia) Maria Titova
Kazan	(Russia) Yana Kudryavtseva	(Belarus) Melitina Staniouta	(Belarus) Katsiaryna Halkina

==== 10 Clubs ====
Competitions	Gold	Silver	Bronze
Category A
Stuttgart	Russia	Italy	Azerbaijan
Category B
Debrecen	Israel	China	Finland
Lisbon	Ukraine	Japan	Not awarded
Lisbon	Ukraine	Spain	Not awarded
Pesaro	Italy	Belarus	Israel
Tashkent	Azerbaijan	Israel	Russia
Minsk	Bulgaria	Belarus	Israel
Sofia	Russia	Bulgaria	Spain
Kazan	Russia	Belarus	Bulgaria

==== 3 Balls 2 Ribbons ====
Competitions	Gold	Silver	Bronze
Category A
Stuttgart	Russia	Israel	Italy
Category B
Debrecen	China	Israel	Azerbaijan
Lisbon	Japan	Spain	Ukraine
Pesaro	Italy	Israel	Japan
Tashkent	Russia	Not awarded	Japan
Tashkent	Israel	Not awarded	Japan
Minsk	Bulgaria	Israel	Spain
Sofia	Russia	Bulgaria	Italy
Kazan	Belarus	Not awarded	Russia
Kazan	Bulgaria	Not awarded	Russia

== Overall medal table ==
Rank	Nation	Gold	Silver	Bronze	Total
1	Russia (RUS)	47	25	12	84
2	Ukraine (UKR)	4	3	8	15
3	South Korea (KOR)	4	3	7	14
4	Bulgaria (BUL)	4	3	3	10
5	Belarus (BLR)	3	18	14	35
6	Italy (ITA)	3	2	3	8
7	Azerbaijan (AZE)	3	1	7	11
8	Israel (ISR)	2	6	5	13
9	Spain (ESP)	1	3	4	8
10	China (CHN)	1	2	1	4
11	Japan (JPN)	1	1	4	6
12	Finland (FIN)	0	0	1	1
12	France (FRA)	0	0	1	1
12	Uzbekistan (UZB)	0	0	1	1
Totals (14 entries)		73	67	71	211

== See also ==
- 2014 FIG Artistic Gymnastics World Cup series
- 2014 Rhythmic Gymnastics Grand Prix circuit
