= Yanika Vartlaan =

Estonian-Ukrainian rhythmic gymnast

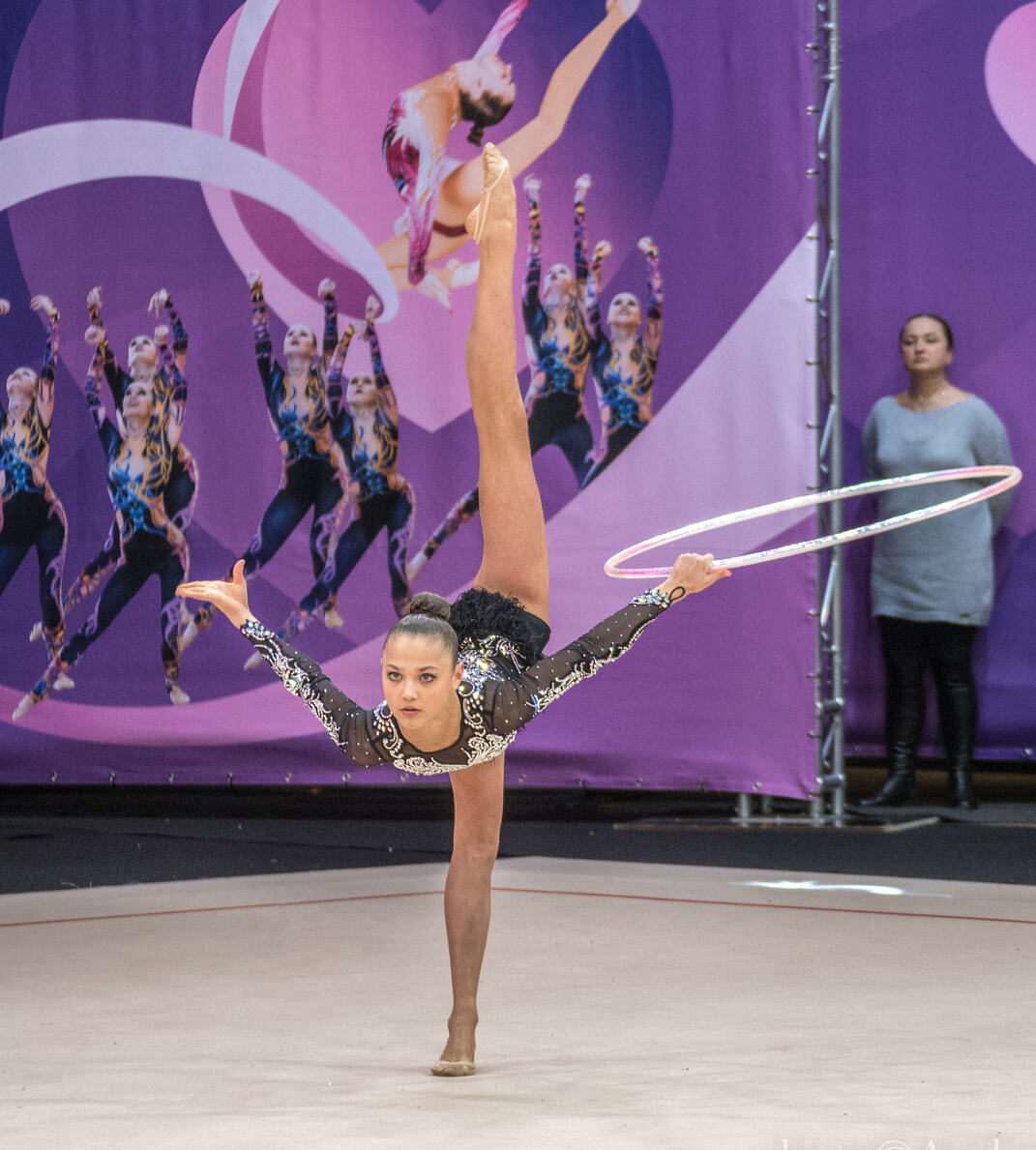
- Vartlaan competing in 2016

Personal information
- Alternative name: Janika Vartlaan
- Born: 30 March 1999 (age 27) Donetsk, Ukraine

Gymnastics career
- Discipline: Rhythmic gymnastics
- Country represented: Ukraine (2018-2020)
- Former countries represented: Estonia (until 2018)
- Training location: Kyiv, Ukraine
- Gym: Deriugins School
- Head coach: Irina Deriugina
- Retired: 2020
Medal record
Representing Ukraine
Rhythmic Gymnastics
Grand Prix Final
Bronze medal – third place	2018 Marbella	Hoop

Yanika Vartlaan (Ukrainian: Яніка Вартлан; born 30 March 1999) is a retired Estonian-Ukrainian rhythmic gymnast. She is the 2018 Grand Prix Final hoop bronze medalist.

== Personal life ==
Yanika Vartlaan was born on 30 March 1999 in Donetsk. Her mother is Ukrainian, and her father is Estonian.

== Gymnastics career ==
Vartlaan initially competed for Estonia, but she did not live or train in Estonia. She trained in Moscow and eventually wanted to compete for the Russian national team. She competed at the 2015 World Cup in Bucharest and finished 33rd in the all-around, and she finished 45th at the World Cup in Kazan. At the European Championships, the Estonian team of Vartlaan, Olga Bogdanova, and Viktoria Bogdanova finished 15th. She competed at the 2016 World Cup in Espoo and finished 27th in the all-around. She also competed at the World Cup in Minsk and finished 17th in the all-around. She won the all-around gold medal at the 2016 Estonian Championships.

At the end of 2017, Vartlaan decided to switch from competing for Estonia to her native country, Ukraine, and she moved from Moscow to Kyiv to train at the Deriugins School. She competed at three events during the 2018 World Cup series. In Tashkent, she finished 21st in the all-around. In Portimao, she finished 10th in the all-around, and she qualified to the event finals in hoop where she finished 6th, clubs where she finished seventh, and ribbon where she finished sixth. Then in Minsk, she finished 15th in the all-around. She won the bronze medal in hoop at the 2018 Grand Prix Final in Marbella. She competed at the 2018 World Championships with Yeva Meleshchuk, and Vlada Nikolchenko, and they finished fifth as a team, and Vartlaan finished 22nd in the all-around final.

Vartlaan competed at the 2019 World Cup in Portimao where she finished 19th in the all-around. She competed at the Italian Serie A and B events in 2019, but she fell during her ribbon routine and injured her leg.

Vartlaan announced her retirement from the sport in August 2020.

== Routine music information ==
Year	Apparatus	Music Title
2018	Hoop	"Nyah and Ethan", "La Cavalera" by Hans Zimmer, Elliot Goldenthal
2018	Ball	El Tango de Roxanne from Moulin Rouge! OST by Ewan McGregor, José Feliciano and Jacek Koman
2018	Clubs	Giselle No. 12 - Allegro Mosso and Giselle: Andante by Adolphe Adams
2018	Ribbon	Swan Lake by Pyotr Ilyich Tchaikovsky

== See also ==
- Nationality changes in gymnastics

== Extrernal links ==
- Yanika Vartlaan at World Gymnastics
- Janika Vartlaan on Instagram
