= List of medalists at the Rhythmic Gymnastics Grand Prix circuit (2014–2023) =

Medalists at the Rhythmic Gymnastics Grand Prix circuit (2014–2023)

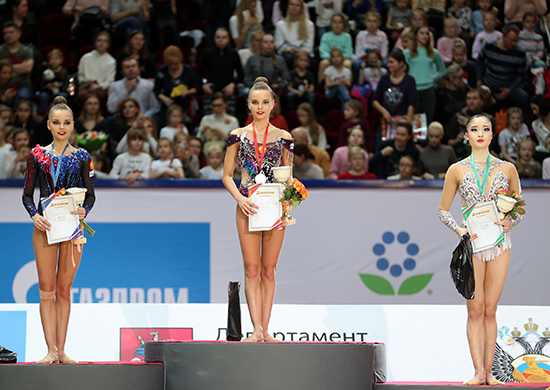
Dina Averina, Arina Averina and Kaho Minagawa at the 2019 Moscow Grand Prix

This is a list of medalists in senior individual events at every stage of the Rhythmic Gymnastics Grand Prix circuit from 2014 to 2023. The circuit has been established in 1994 and earning medals in the different stages of the circuit is considered a prestigious achievement in the sport of rhythmic gymnastics. The list includes senior medalists in the regular stages of the circuit, as well as the Grand Prix Final. Group events, either at official Grand Prix competitions or international tournaments held alongside Grand Prix stages, are not covered in this article.

== 2014 ==
=== Events ===
| Date | Event | Location | Ref. |
|---|---|---|---|
| February 28–March 2 | Gazprom Grand Prix | (Russia) Moscow | |
| March 8–10 | Thiais Grand Prix | (France) Thiais | |
| March 28–30 | Holon Grand Prix | (Israel) Holon | |
| October 16–17 | Berlin Masters Grand Prix | (Germany) Berlin | |
| October 31–November 2 | Grand Prix Brno | (Czech Republic) Brno | |
| November 14–15 | Grand Prix Final: Grand Prix Innsbruck | (Austria) Innsbruck | |

=== Medalists ===
==== Individual all-around ====
| Competitions | Gold | Silver | Bronze |
|---|---|---|---|
| Moscow | (Russia) Margarita Mamun | (Russia) Maria Titova | (Russia) Yana Kudryavtseva |
| Thiais | (Russia) Yana Kudryavtseva | (Russia) Margarita Mamun | (Israel) Neta Rivkin |
| Holon | (Russia) Margarita Mamun | (Russia) Yana Kudryavtseva | (Russia) Maria Titova |
| Berlin | (Russia) Maria Titova | (Israel) Victoria Filanovsky | (Germany) Jana Berezko-Marggrander |
| Brno | (Russia) Margarita Mamun | (Israel) Neta Rivkin | (Israel) Victoria Filanovsky |
| Innsbruck | (Russia) Margarita Mamun | (Israel) Neta Rivkin | (Bulgaria) Neviana Vladinova |

==== Hoop ====
| Competitions | Gold | Silver | Bronze |
|---|---|---|---|
| Moscow | (Russia) Margarita Mamun | (Russia) Yana Kudryavtseva | (South Korea) Son Yeon-jae |
| Thiais | (Russia) Yana Kudryavtseva | (Russia) Margarita Mamun | (Ukraine) Hanna Rizatdinova |
| Holon | (Israel) Neta Rivkin (Russia) Margarita Mamun | None awarded | (Ukraine) Viktoria Mazur |
| Berlin | (Russia) Maria Titova | (Israel) Victoria Filanovsky | (Germany) Laura Jung |
| Brno | (Russia) Margarita Mamun | (Israel) Neta Rivkin | (Russia) Maria Titova |
| Innsbruck | (Russia) Margarita Mamun | (Israel) Neta Rivkin | (Austria) Nicol Ruprecht |

==== Ball ====
| Competitions | Gold | Silver | Bronze |
|---|---|---|---|
| Moscow | (Russia) Margarita Mamun | (Russia) Maria Titova | (Belarus) Melitina Staniouta |
| Thiais | (Russia) Yana Kudryavtseva | (Ukraine) Hanna Rizatdinova | (France) Kseniya Moustafaeva |
| Holon | (Russia) Margarita Mamun | (Israel) Neta Rivkin | (Russia) Yana Kudryavtseva |
| Berlin | (Russia) Maria Titova | (Germany) Jana Berezko-Marggrander | (Kazakhstan) Aliya Assymova |
| Brno | (Russia) Margarita Mamun | (Israel) Neta Rivkin | (Israel) Victoria Filanovsky |
| Innsbruck | (Russia) Margarita Mamun | (Israel) Victoria Filanovsky | (Bulgaria) Neviana Vladinova |

==== Clubs ====
| Competitions | Gold | Silver | Bronze |
|---|---|---|---|
| Moscow | (Russia) Margarita Mamun | (Russia) Yana Kudryavtseva | (South Korea) Son Yeon-jae |
| Thiais | (Russia) Margarita Mamun | (Russia) Yana Kudryavtseva | (Ukraine) Hanna Rizatdinova |
| Holon | (Russia) Yana Kudryavtseva | (Israel) Neta Rivkin | (Russia) Maria Titova |
| Berlin | (Germany) Jana Berezko-Marggrander | (Israel) Victoria Filanovsky | (Belarus) Hanna Bazhko |
| Brno | (Russia) Margarita Mamun | (Russia) Maria Titova | (Israel) Neta Rivkin |
| Innsbruck | (Russia) Margarita Mamun | (Bulgaria) Neviana Vladinova | (Israel) Victoria Filanovsky |

==== Ribbon ====
| Competitions | Gold | Silver | Bronze |
|---|---|---|---|
| Moscow | (Russia) Maria Titova | (Russia) Margarita Mamun | (South Korea) Son Yeon-jae |
| Thiais | (Belarus) Melitina Staniouta (Ukraine) Hanna Rizatdinova | None awarded | (Russia) Maria Titova |
| Holon | (Russia) Yana Kudryavtseva | (Russia) Margarita Mamun | (Israel) Neta Rivkin |
| Berlin | (Russia) Maria Titova | (Israel) Victoria Filanovsky | (Belarus) Hanna Bazhko |
| Brno | (Russia) Margarita Mamun | (Israel) Neta Rivkin | (Russia) Maria Titova |
| Innsbruck | (Russia) Margarita Mamun | (Bulgaria) Neviana Vladinova | (Israel) Victoria Filanovsky |

== 2015 ==
=== Events ===
| Date | Event | Location | Ref. |
|---|---|---|---|
| February 20–22 | Gazprom Grand Prix | (Russia) Moscow | |
| March 20–23 | Thiais Grand Prix | (France) Thiais | |
| May 15–16 | Holon Grand Prix | (Israel) Holon | |
| May 29–30 | Grand Prix Berlin | (Germany) Berlin | |
| October 15–19 | Grand Prix Final: Brno Grand Prix | (Czech Republic) Brno | |

=== Medalists ===
==== Individual all-around ====
| Competitions | Gold | Silver | Bronze |
|---|---|---|---|
| Moscow | (Russia) Margarita Mamun | (Russia) Yana Kudryavtseva | (Belarus) Melitina Staniouta |
| Thiais | (Ukraine) Hanna Rizatdinova | (France) Kseniya Moustafaeva | (Israel) Neta Rivkin |
| Holon | (Russia) Yana Kudryavtseva | (Russia) Margarita Mamun | (Russia) Aleksandra Soldatova |
| Berlin | (Russia) Margarita Mamun | (Belarus) Melitina Staniouta | (Russia) Aleksandra Soldatova |
| Brno | (Russia) Margarita Mamun | (Israel) Linoy Ashram | (Belarus) Elena Bolotina |

==== Hoop ====
| Competitions | Gold | Silver | Bronze |
|---|---|---|---|
| Moscow | (Russia) Margarita Mamun | (Belarus) Melitina Staniouta | (Israel) Neta Rivkin |
| Thiais | (Israel) Neta Rivkin | (Ukraine) Hanna Rizatdinova | (Azerbaijan) Marina Durunda |
| Holon | (Russia) Yana Kudryavtseva | (Russia) Margarita Mamun | (Israel) Neta Rivkin |
| Berlin | (Russia) Margarita Mamun | (Russia) Aleksandra Soldatova | (Belarus) Melitina Staniouta |
| Brno | (Russia) Margarita Mamun | (Israel) Linoy Ashram | (Uzbekistan) Anastasiya Serdyukova |

==== Ball ====
| Competitions | Gold | Silver | Bronze |
|---|---|---|---|
| Moscow | (Russia) Aleksandra Soldatova | (Belarus) Melitina Staniouta | (Russia) Margarita Mamun |
| Thiais | (Ukraine) Hanna Rizatdinova | (Israel) Neta Rivkin | (France) Kseniya Moustafaeva |
| Holon | (Russia) Yana Kudryavtseva | (Russia) Aleksandra Soldatova | (Israel) Neta Rivkin |
| Berlin | (Russia) Margarita Mamun | (Israel) Neta Rivkin | (Belarus) Melitina Staniouta |
| Brno | (Russia) Margarita Mamun | (Israel) Linoy Ashram | (Uzbekistan) Anastasiya Serdyukova |

==== Clubs ====
| Competitions | Gold | Silver | Bronze |
|---|---|---|---|
| Moscow | (Belarus) Melitina Staniouta | (Russia) Yana Kudryavtseva | (Georgia (country)) Salome Pazhava |
| Thiais | (Azerbaijan) Marina Durunda | (Ukraine) Hanna Rizatdinova | (France) Kseniya Moustafaeva |
| Holon | (Russia) Yana Kudryavtseva | (Ukraine) Hanna Rizatdinova | (Russia) Margarita Mamun |
| Berlin | (Russia) Margarita Mamun | (Russia) Aleksandra Soldatova | (Belarus) Melitina Staniouta |
| Brno | (Israel) Linoy Ashram | (Uzbekistan) Anastasiya Serdyukova | (Belarus) Elena Bolotina |

==== Ribbon ====
| Competitions | Gold | Silver | Bronze |
|---|---|---|---|
| Moscow | (Russia) Margarita Mamun | (Russia) Yana Kudryavtseva | (Belarus) Melitina Staniouta |
| Thiais | (Ukraine) Hanna Rizatdinova | (Azerbaijan) Marina Durunda | (France) Kseniya Moustafaeva |
| Holon | (Ukraine) Hanna Rizatdinova | (Russia) Aleksandra Soldatova | (Russia) Margarita Mamun |
| Berlin | (Belarus) Melitina Staniouta | (Russia) Aleksandra Soldatova | (Belarus) Katsiaryna Halkina (Russia) Margarita Mamun |
| Brno | (Uzbekistan) Anastasiya Serdyukova | (Israel) Linoy Ashram | (Belarus) Elena Bolotina |

== 2016 ==
=== Events ===
| Date | Event | Location | Ref. |
|---|---|---|---|
| February 17–22 | Gazprom Grand Prix | (Russia) Moscow | |
| March 24–27 | Thiais Grand Prix | (France) Thiais | |
| May 5–8 | Grand Prix Brno | (Czech Republic) Brno | |
| May 13–15 | Grand Prix Bucharest | (Romania) Bucharest | |
| September 23–24 | Grand Prix Final: Grand Prix Eilat | (Israel) Eilat | |

=== Medalists ===
==== Individual all-around ====
| Competitions | Gold | Silver | Bronze |
|---|---|---|---|
| Moscow | (Russia) Aleksandra Soldatova | (South Korea) Son Yeon-jae | (Russia) Arina Averina |
| Thiais | (Russia) Margarita Mamun | (Russia) Aleksandra Soldatova | (Belarus) Melitina Staniouta |
| Brno | (Russia) Margarita Mamun | (Belarus) Melitina Staniouta | (Russia) Dina Averina |
| Bucharest | (Belarus) Melitina Staniouta | (Russia) Arina Averina | (Russia) Dina Averina |
| Eilat | (Russia) Aleksandra Soldatova | (Russia) Dina Averina | (Russia) Arina Averina |

==== Hoop ====
| Competitions | Gold | Silver | Bronze |
|---|---|---|---|
| Moscow | (Russia) Aleksandra Soldatova | (South Korea) Son Yeon-jae | (Georgia (country)) Salome Pazhava |
| Thiais | (Russia) Margarita Mamun | (Russia) Aleksandra Soldatova | (Belarus) Melitina Staniouta |
| Brno | (Russia) Margarita Mamun | (Russia) Dina Averina | (Belarus) Melitina Staniouta |
| Bucharest | (Belarus) Melitina Staniouta | (Georgia (country)) Salome Pazhava | (Russia) Dina Averina |
| Eilat | (Russia) Aleksandra Soldatova | (Russia) Arina Averina | (Israel) Victoria Filanovsky |

==== Ball ====
| Competitions | Gold | Silver | Bronze |
|---|---|---|---|
| Moscow | (Russia) Margarita Mamun (Russia) Aleksandra Soldatova | None awarded | (South Korea) Son Yeon-jae |
| Thiais | (Russia) Aleksandra Soldatova | (Russia) Margarita Mamun | (Belarus) Melitina Staniouta |
| Brno | (Russia) Margarita Mamun | (Belarus) Melitina Staniouta | (Israel) Victoria Filanovsky |
| Bucharest | (Belarus) Melitina Staniouta | (Belarus) Katsiaryna Halkina (Russia) Arina Averina (Russia) Dina Averina | None awarded |
| Eilat | (Russia) Aleksandra Soldatova | (Russia) Dina Averina | (Israel) Victoria Filanovsky |

==== Clubs ====
| Competitions | Gold | Silver | Bronze |
|---|---|---|---|
| Moscow | (Russia) Margarita Mamun | (Russia) Arina Averina | (Belarus) Melitina Staniouta |
| Thiais | (Russia) Margarita Mamun | (Ukraine) Hanna Rizatdinova | (Belarus) Melitina Staniouta |
| Brno | (Russia) Margarita Mamun | (Belarus) Melitina Staniouta | (Georgia (country)) Salome Pazhava |
| Bucharest | (Georgia (country)) Salome Pazhava | (Russia) Dina Averina | (Russia) Arina Averina |
| Eilat | (Russia) Aleksandra Soldatova | (Israel) Victoria Filanovsky | (Israel) Linoy Ashram |

==== Ribbon ====
| Competitions | Gold | Silver | Bronze |
|---|---|---|---|
| Moscow | (Russia) Arina Averina | (Russia) Aleksandra Soldatova | (South Korea) Son Yeon-jae |
| Thiais | (Russia) Aleksandra Soldatova | (Belarus) Melitina Staniouta | (Ukraine) Hanna Rizatdinova |
| Brno | (Russia) Margarita Mamun | (Russia) Dina Averina | (Israel) Victoria Filanovsky |
| Bucharest | (Belarus) Melitina Staniouta | (Georgia (country)) Salome Pazhava | (Russia) Arina Averina |
| Eilat | (Russia) Aleksandra Soldatova | (Russia) Arina Averina | (Israel) Victoria Filanovsky |

== 2017 ==
=== Events ===
| Date | Event | Location | Ref. |
|---|---|---|---|
| February 15–20 | Gazprom Grand Prix | (Russia) Moscow | |
| March 16–19 | Kyiv Grand Prix | (Ukraine) Kyiv | |
| March 23–27 | Thiais Grand Prix | (France) Thiais | |
| March 30–April 2 | Marbella Grand Prix | (Spain) Marbella | |
| ~~June 16–18~~ | ~~Saint Petersburg Grand Prix~~; Canceled due to conflicting dates with a football match in Saint Petersburg | ~~(Russia) Saint Petersburg~~ | |
| June 22–26 | Holon Grand Prix | (Israel) Holon | |
| October 19–23 | Grand Prix Brno | (Czech Republic) Brno | |
| November 22–25 | Grand Prix Final: Grand Prix Eilat | (Israel) Eilat | |

=== Medalists ===
==== Individual all-around ====
| Competitions | Gold | Silver | Bronze |
|---|---|---|---|
| Moscow | (Russia) Dina Averina | (Russia) Aleksandra Soldatova | (Russia) Arina Averina |
| Kyiv | (Russia) Polina Khonina | (Russia) Yulia Bravikova | (Israel) Victoria Filanovsky |
| Thiais | (Russia) Dina Averina | (Belarus) Katsiaryna Halkina | (Russia) Yulia Bravikova |
| Marbella | (Russia) Aleksandra Soldatova | (Russia) Arina Averina | (Russia) Yulia Bravikova |
| Holon | (Russia) Arina Averina | (Russia) Dina Averina | (Russia) Yulia Bravikova |
| Brno | (Russia) Yulia Bravikova | (Russia) Polina Khonina | (Belarus) Julia Evchik |
| Eilat | (Russia) Yulia Bravikova | (Belarus) Julia Evchik | (Ukraine) Kateryna Lutsenko |

==== Hoop ====
| Competitions | Gold | Silver | Bronze |
|---|---|---|---|
| Moscow | (Russia) Dina Averina | (Russia) Aleksandra Soldatova | (Belarus) Katsiaryna Halkina |
| Kyiv | (Israel) Victoria Filanovsky | (Russia) Yulia Bravikova | (Ukraine) Viktoria Mazur |
| Thiais | (Russia) Dina Averina | (Russia) Yulia Bravikova | (France) Kseniya Moustafaeva |
| Marbella | (Russia) Aleksandra Soldatova | (Russia) Yulia Bravikova | (Bulgaria) Neviana Vladinova |
| Holon | (Russia) Yulia Bravikova | (Israel) Victoria Filanovsky | (France) Kseniya Moustafaeva |
| Brno | (Russia) Yulia Bravikova | (Russia) Polina Khonina | (Italy) Alessia Russo |
| Eilat | (Russia) Yulia Bravikova | (Belarus) Julia Evchik | (Ukraine) Olena Diachenko |

==== Ball ====
| Competitions | Gold | Silver | Bronze |
|---|---|---|---|
| Moscow | (Russia) Aleksandra Soldatova | (Russia) Dina Averina | (Belarus) Katsiaryna Halkina |
| Kyiv | (Bulgaria) Katrin Taseva | (Russia) Polina Khonina | (Israel) Victoria Filanovsky |
| Thiais | (Russia) Dina Averina | (Ukraine) Viktoria Mazur | (Russia) Yulia Bravikova |
| Marbella | (Russia) Aleksandra Soldatova | (Bulgaria) Neviana Vladinova | (Russia) Arina Averina |
| Holon | (Russia) Dina Averina | (Russia) Arina Averina | (France) Kseniya Moustafaeva |
| Brno | (Russia) Yulia Bravikova | (Russia) Polina Khonina | (Italy) Alessia Russo |
| Eilat | (Russia) Yulia Bravikova | (Georgia (country)) Elina Valieva | (Ukraine) Olena Diachenko |

==== Clubs ====
| Competitions | Gold | Silver | Bronze |
|---|---|---|---|
| Moscow | (Russia) Dina Averina | (Russia) Yulia Bravikova | (Israel) Linoy Ashram |
| Kyiv | (Russia) Yulia Bravikova | (Russia) Polina Khonina | (Israel) Victoria Filanovsky |
| Thiais | (Russia) Dina Averina | (Russia) Yulia Bravikova | (Belarus) Alina Harnasko |
| Marbella | (Russia) Aleksandra Soldatova | (Bulgaria) Neviana Vladinova | (Russia) Arina Averina |
| Holon | (Russia) Yulia Bravikova | (Russia) Dina Averina | (Israel) Victoria Filanovsky |
| Brno | (Russia) Yulia Bravikova | (Russia) Polina Khonina | (Belarus) Julia Evchik |
| Eilat | (Russia) Yulia Bravikova | (Belarus) Julia Evchik | (Belarus) Yuljya Isachanka |

==== Ribbon ====
| Competitions | Gold | Silver | Bronze |
|---|---|---|---|
| Moscow | (Russia) Dina Averina | (Russia) Arina Averina | (Belarus) Katsiaryna Halkina |
| Kyiv | (Russia) Yulia Bravikova | (Russia) Polina Khonina | (Israel) Victoria Filanovsky (Ukraine) Olena Diachenko |
| Thiais | (Russia) Yulia Bravikova | (Russia) Dina Averina | (France) Kseniya Moustafaeva |
| Marbella | (Russia) Aleksandra Soldatova | (Bulgaria) Neviana Vladinova | (Belarus) Alina Harnasko |
| Holon | (Russia) Arina Averina | (Israel) Victoria Filanovsky | (Russia) Yulia Bravikova |
| Brno | (Russia) Yulia Bravikova | (Belarus) Julia Evchik | (Russia) Polina Khonina |
| Eilat | (Russia) Yulia Bravikova | (Belarus) Julia Evchik | (Georgia (country)) Elina Valieva |

== 2018 ==
=== Events ===
| Date | Event | Location | Ref. |
|---|---|---|---|
| February 14–18 | Moscow Grand Prix | (Russia) Moscow | |
| March 14–18 | Kyiv Grand Prix | (Ukraine) Kyiv | |
| March 22–25 | Thiais Grand Prix | (France) Thiais | |
| May 16–17 | Holon Grand Prix | (Israel) Holon | |
| October 11–15 | Grand Prix Brno | (Czech Republic) Brno | |
| October 27–28 | Grand Prix Final: Marbella Grand Prix | (Spain) Marbella | |

=== Medalists ===
==== Individual all-around ====
| Competitions | Gold | Silver | Bronze |
|---|---|---|---|
| Moscow | (Russia) Dina Averina | (Russia) Arina Averina | (Russia) Yulia Bravikova |
| Kiyv | (Russia) Ekaterina Selezneva | (Bulgaria) Katrin Taseva | (Russia) Maria Sergeeva |
| Thiais | (Russia) Dina Averina | (Russia) Ekaterina Selezneva | (Bulgaria) Boryana Kaleyn |
| Holon | (Russia) Arina Averina | (Russia) Aleksandra Soldatova | (Russia) Ekaterina Selezneva |
| Brno | (Russia) Ekaterina Selezneva | (Belarus) Anastasiia Salos | (Russia) Maria Sergeeva |
| Marbella | (Ukraine) Vlada Nikolchenko | (Belarus) Alina Harnasko | (Russia) Ekaterina Selezneva |

==== Hoop ====
| Competitions | Gold | Silver | Bronze |
|---|---|---|---|
| Moscow | (Russia) Dina Averina | (Bulgaria) Boryana Kaleyn | (Belarus) Katsiaryna Halkina |
| Kiyv | (Russia) Maria Sergeeva | (Russia) Ekaterina Selezneva | (Ukraine) Olena Diachenko |
| Thiais | (Ukraine) Vlada Nikolchenko | (Russia) Arina Averina | (Russia) Ekaterina Selezneva |
| Holon | (Russia) Arina Averina | (Ukraine) Vlada Nikolchenko | (Belarus) Katsiaryna Halkina |
| Brno | (Russia) Ekaterina Selezneva | (Russia) Maria Sergeeva | (Ukraine) Olena Diachenko |
| Marbella | (Russia) Maria Sergeeva | (Russia) Ekaterina Selezneva | (Ukraine) Yanika Vartlaan |

==== Ball ====
| Competitions | Gold | Silver | Bronze |
|---|---|---|---|
| Moscow | (Bulgaria) Boryana Kaleyn | (Russia) Dina Averina | (Belarus) Katsiaryna Halkina |
| Kiyv | (Russia) Ekaterina Selezneva | (Bulgaria) Katrin Taseva | (Russia) Maria Sergeeva |
| Thiais | (Russia) Dina Averina | (Israel) Nicol Zelikman | (Bulgaria) Boryana Kaleyn |
| Holon | (Belarus) Katsiaryna Halkina | (Russia) Arina Averina | (Italy) Milena Baldassarri |
| Brno | (Russia) Ekaterina Selezneva | (Russia) Maria Sergeeva | (Ukraine) Olena Diachenko |
| Marbella | (Russia) Ekaterina Selezneva | (Ukraine) Vlada Nikolchenko | (Belarus) Alina Harnasko |

==== Clubs ====
| Competitions | Gold | Silver | Bronze |
|---|---|---|---|
| Moscow | (Russia) Dina Averina | (Russia) Aleksandra Soldatova | (Israel) Yuliana Telegina |
| Kiyv | (Russia) Maria Sergeeva | (Russia) Ekaterina Selezneva | (Bulgaria) Katrin Taseva |
| Thiais | (Russia) Arina Averina | (Russia) Dina Averina | (Bulgaria) Boryana Kaleyn |
| Holon | (Georgia (country)) Salome Pazhava | (Ukraine) Vlada Nikolchenko | (Russia) Ekaterina Selezneva |
| Brno | (Russia) Ekaterina Selezneva | (Israel) Nicol Voronkov | (Ukraine) Yanika Vartlaan |
| Marbella | (Ukraine) Vlada Nikolchenko | (United States) Nastasya Generalova | (Russia) Polina Khonina |

==== Ribbon ====
| Competitions | Gold | Silver | Bronze |
|---|---|---|---|
| Moscow | (Belarus) Katsiaryna Halkina | (Russia) Aleksandra Soldatova | (Bulgaria) Boryana Kaleyn |
| Kiyv | (Russia) Ekaterina Selezneva | (Bulgaria) Katrin Taseva | (Belarus) Julia Evchik |
| Thiais | (Russia) Dina Averina | (Russia) Ekaterina Selezneva | (Bulgaria) Katrin Taseva |
| Holon | (Italy) Milena Baldassarri | (Russia) Ekaterina Selezneva | (Ukraine) Yeva Meleshchuk |
| Brno | (Russia) Maria Sergeeva | (Ukraine) Olena Diachenko | (Ukraine) Yanika Vartlaan |
| Marbella | (Ukraine) Vlada Nikolchenko | (Russia) Ekaterina Selezneva | (Russia) Polina Khonina |

== 2019 ==
=== Events ===
| Date | Event | Location | Ref. |
|---|---|---|---|
| February 14–18 | Moscow Grand Prix | (Russia) Moscow | |
| February 28–March 3 | Marbella Grand Prix | (Spain) Marbella | |
| March 13–19 | Kyiv Grand Prix | (Ukraine) Kyiv | |
| March 28–April 1 | Thiais Grand Prix | (France) Thiais | |
| May 29–June 2 | Holon Grand Prix | (Israel) Holon | |
| June 6–10 | Grand Prix Final: Brno Grand Prix | (Czech Republic) Brno | |

=== Medalists ===
==== Individual all-around ====
| Competitions | Gold | Silver | Bronze |
|---|---|---|---|
| Moscow | (Russia) Dina Averina | (Russia) Arina Averina | (Russia) Aleksandra Soldatova |
| Marbella | (Russia) Dina Averina | (Russia) Aleksandra Soldatova | (Belarus) Anastasiia Salos |
| Kiyv | (Ukraine) Vlada Nikolchenko | (Bulgaria) Katrin Taseva | (Russia) Ekaterina Selezneva |
| Thiais | (Russia) Arina Averina | (Israel) Linoy Ashram | (Russia) Dina Averina |
| Holon | (Belarus) Anastasiia Salos | (Russia) Irina Annenkova | (Russia) Anastasia Guzenkova |
| Brno | (Russia) Daria Trubnikova | (Russia) Arina Averina | (Bulgaria) Katrin Taseva |

==== Hoop ====
| Competitions | Gold | Silver | Bronze |
|---|---|---|---|
| Moscow | (Russia) Dina Averina | (Russia) Arina Averina | (Japan) Kaho Minagawa |
| Marbella | (Israel) Linoy Ashram | (Russia) Dina Averina | (Ukraine) Vlada Nikolchenko |
| Kiyv | (Ukraine) Vlada Nikolchenko | (Russia) Ekaterina Selezneva | (Bulgaria) Katrin Taseva |
| Thiais | (Israel) Linoy Ashram | (Russia) Arina Averina | (Ukraine) Vlada Nikolchenko |
| Holon | (Russia) Irina Annenkova | (Ukraine) Vlada Nikolchenko | (Bulgaria) Katrin Taseva |
| Brno | (Russia) Arina Averina | (Bulgaria) Boryana Kaleyn | (United States) Laura Zeng |

==== Ball ====
| Competitions | Gold | Silver | Bronze |
|---|---|---|---|
| Moscow | (Russia) Arina Averina | (Russia) Ekaterina Selezneva | (Bulgaria) Neviana Vladinova |
| Marbella | (Russia) Dina Averina | (Belarus) Katsiaryna Halkina | (Russia) Arina Averina |
| Kiyv | (Russia) Ekaterina Selezneva | (Ukraine) Vlada Nikolchenko | (Russia) Anastasia Guzenkova |
| Thiais | (Russia) Arina Averina | (Israel) Linoy Ashram | (Belarus) Katsiaryna Halkina |
| Holon | (Belarus) Anastasiia Salos | (Slovenia) Ekaterina Vedeneeva | (Russia) Anastasia Guzenkova |
| Brno | (Russia) Arina Averina | (Bulgaria) Katrin Taseva | (Bulgaria) Boryana Kaleyn |

==== Clubs ====
| Competitions | Gold | Silver | Bronze |
|---|---|---|---|
| Moscow | (Russia) Aleksandra Soldatova | (Russia) Dina Averina | (Georgia (country)) Salome Pazhava |
| Marbella | (Israel) Linoy Ashram | (Russia) Arina Averina | (Russia) Dina Averina |
| Kiyv | (Georgia (country)) Salome Pazhava | (Ukraine) Khrystyna Pohranychna | (Russia) Daria Trubnikova |
| Thiais | (Russia) Dina Averina | (Russia) Arina Averina | (Belarus) Katsiaryna Halkina |
| Holon | (Bulgaria) Katrin Taseva | (Russia) Irina Annenkova | (Belarus) Anastasiia Salos |
| Brno | (Belarus) Alina Harnasko | (Bulgaria) Katrin Taseva | (Ukraine) Viktoriia Onopriienko |

==== Ribbon ====
| Competitions | Gold | Silver | Bronze |
|---|---|---|---|
| Moscow | (Russia) Arina Averina | (Russia) Dina Averina | (Belarus) Anastasiia Salos |
| Marbella | (Israel) Linoy Ashram | (Russia) Dina Averina | (Russia) Aleksandra Soldatova |
| Kiyv | (Bulgaria) Katrin Taseva | (Ukraine) Yeva Meleshchuk | (Ukraine) Vlada Nikolchenko |
| Thiais | (Russia) Arina Averina | (Bulgaria) Boryana Kaleyn | (Israel) Linoy Ashram |
| Holon | (Russia) Anastasia Guzenkova | (Belarus) Anastasiia Salos | (Bulgaria) Neviana Vladinova |
| Brno | (Russia) Arina Averina | (Belarus) Alina Harnasko | (Bulgaria) Katrin Taseva |

== 2020 ==
=== Events ===
| Date | Event | Location | Ref. |
|---|---|---|---|
| February 7–9 | Moscow Grand Prix | (Russia) Moscow | |
| February 29–March 1 | Miss Valentine Grand Prix | (Estonia) Tartu | |
| March 7–8 | Grand Prix Brno | (Czech Republic) Brno | |
| ~~March 13–15~~ | ~~Marbella Grand Prix~~; Canceled due to the 2020 coronavirus pandemic in Europe | ~~(Spain) Marbella~~ | |
| ~~March 26–30~~ | ~~Thiais Grand Prix~~; Canceled due to the 2020 coronavirus pandemic in Europe | ~~(France) Thiais~~ | |
| September 10–13 | Deriugina Cup Grand Prix | (Ukraine) Kyiv | |

=== Medalists ===
==== Individual all-around ====
| Competitions | Gold | Silver | Bronze |
|---|---|---|---|
| Moscow | (Russia) Dina Averina | (Russia) Daria Trubnikova | (Russia) Lala Kramarenko |
| Tartu | (Russia) Arina Averina | (Russia) Lala Kramarenko | (Russia) Ekaterina Selezneva |
| Brno | (Belarus) Alina Harnasko | (Ukraine) Khrystyna Pohranychna | (Bulgaria) Boryana Kaleyn |
| Kiyv | (Ukraine) Viktoriia Onopriienko | (Belarus) Alina Harnasko | (Belarus) Anastasiia Salos |

==== Hoop ====
| Competitions | Gold | Silver | Bronze |
|---|---|---|---|
| Moscow | (Russia) Ekaterina Selezneva | (Belarus) Anastasiia Salos | (Russia) Daria Trubnikova |
| Tartu | (Russia) Arina Averina | (Belarus) Katsiaryna Halkina | (Bulgaria) Tatyana Volozhanina |
| Brno | (Belarus) Alina Harnasko | (Ukraine) Khrystyna Pohranychna | (Ukraine) Vlada Nikolchenko |
| Kiyv | (Ukraine) Viktoriia Onopriienko | (Ukraine) Yeva Meleshchuk | (Belarus) Anastasiia Salos |

==== Ball ====
| Competitions | Gold | Silver | Bronze |
|---|---|---|---|
| Moscow | (Russia) Dina Averina | (Belarus) Anastasiia Salos | (Russia) Lala Kramarenko |
| Tartu | (Russia) Arina Averina | (Russia) Ekaterina Selezneva | (Ukraine) Khrystyna Pohranychna |
| Brno | (Ukraine) Vlada Nikolchenko | (Ukraine) Yeva Meleshchuk | (United States) Evita Griskenas |
| Kiyv | (Belarus) Alina Harnasko | (Belarus) Anastasiia Salos | (Ukraine) Yeva Meleshchuk |

==== Clubs ====
| Competitions | Gold | Silver | Bronze |
|---|---|---|---|
| Moscow | (Russia) Daria Trubnikova | (Russia) Dina Averina | (Georgia (country)) Salome Pazhava |
| Tartu | (Russia) Arina Averina | (Russia) Lala Kramarenko | (Ukraine) Vlada Nikolchenko |
| Brno | (Bulgaria) Boryana Kaleyn | (Ukraine) Yeva Meleshchuk | (Latvia) Jelizaveta Polstjanaja |
| Kiyv | (Ukraine) Vlada Nikolchenko | (Belarus) Anastasiia Salos | (Belarus) Alina Harnasko |

==== Ribbon ====
| Competitions | Gold | Silver | Bronze |
|---|---|---|---|
| Moscow | (Russia) Dina Averina | (Russia) Ekaterina Selezneva | (Slovenia) Ekaterina Vedeneeva |
| Tartu | (Russia) Arina Averina | (Russia) Lala Kramarenko | (Bulgaria) Tatyana Volozhanina |
| Brno | (Ukraine) Vlada Nikolchenko | (Bulgaria) Boryana Kaleyn | (Belarus) Alina Harnasko |
| Kiyv | (Belarus) Alina Harnasko | (Ukraine) Viktoriia Onopriienko | (Belarus) Anastasiia Salos |

== 2021 ==
=== Events ===
| Date | Event | Location | Ref. |
|---|---|---|---|
| February 17–21 | Moscow Grand Prix | (Russia) Moscow | |
| ~~June 17–20~~ | ~~Miss Valentine Grand Prix~~; Canceled due to the 2020 coronavirus pandemic in Europe | ~~(Estonia) Tartu~~ | |
| July 17–21 | Grand Prix Israel | (Israel) Tel Aviv | |
| October 15–17 | Grand Prix Marbella | (Spain) Marbella | |

=== Medalists ===
==== Individual all-around ====
| Competitions | Gold | Silver | Bronze |
|---|---|---|---|
| Moscow | (Russia) Dina Averina | (Russia) Arina Averina | (Russia) Lala Kramarenko |
| Tel Aviv | (Israel) Linoy Ashram | (Belarus) Alina Harnasko | (Belarus) Anastasiia Salos |
| Marbella | (Russia) Lala Kramarenko | (Ukraine) Viktoriia Onopriienko | (Russia) Anastasia Simakova |

==== Hoop ====
| Competitions | Gold | Silver | Bronze |
|---|---|---|---|
| Moscow | (Russia) Arina Averina | (Russia) Dina Averina | (Bulgaria) Boryana Kaleyn |
| Tel Aviv | (Israel) Linoy Ashram | (Belarus) Anastasiia Salos | (Belarus) Alina Harnasko |
| Marbella | (Russia) Lala Kramarenko | (Russia) Ekaterina Selezneva | (Ukraine) Viktoriia Onopriienko |

==== Ball ====
| Competitions | Gold | Silver | Bronze |
|---|---|---|---|
| Moscow | (Russia) Dina Averina | (Russia) Arina Averina | (Bulgaria) Boryana Kaleyn |
| Tel Aviv | (Israel) Linoy Ashram | (Belarus) Alina Harnasko | (Belarus) Anastasiia Salos |
| Marbella | (Russia) Lala Kramarenko | (Russia) Anastasia Simakova | (Italy) Sofia Raffaeli |

==== Clubs ====
| Competitions | Gold | Silver | Bronze |
|---|---|---|---|
| Moscow | (Bulgaria) Boryana Kaleyn | (Russia) Arina Averina | (Russia) Dina Averina |
| Tel Aviv | (Israel) Linoy Ashram | (Belarus) Alina Harnasko | (Belarus) Anastasiia Salos |
| Marbella | (Italy) Sofia Raffaeli | (Russia) Lala Kramarenko | (Ukraine) Viktoriia Onopriienko |

==== Ribbon ====
| Competitions | Gold | Silver | Bronze |
|---|---|---|---|
| Moscow | (Russia) Dina Averina | (Bulgaria) Boryana Kaleyn | (Slovenia) Ekaterina Vedeneeva |
| Tel Aviv | (Israel) Linoy Ashram | (Belarus) Alina Harnasko | (Belarus) Anastasiia Salos |
| Marbella | (Russia) Lala Kramarenko | (Ukraine) Viktoriia Onopriienko | (Italy) Sofia Raffaeli |

== 2022 ==
=== Events ===
| Date | Event | Location | Ref. |
|---|---|---|---|
| February 18–20 | Grand Prix Moscow 2022 | (Russia) Moscow | |
| February 26–27 | Miss Valentine Tartu Grand Prix 2022 | (Estonia) Tartu | |
| March 26–27 | Grand Prix Marbella 2022 | (Spain) Marbella | |
| October 15–16 | Grand Prix Brno Tart Cup 2022 | (Czech Republic) Brno | |

=== Medalists ===
==== Individual all-around ====
| Competitions | Gold | Silver | Bronze |
|---|---|---|---|
| Moscow | (Russia) Dina Averina | (Russia) Lala Kramarenko | (Russia) Arina Averina |
| Tartu | (Belarus) Alina Harnasko | (Canada) Carmel Kallemaa | (Belarus) Arina Krasnorutskaia |
| Marbella | (Bulgaria) Eva Brezalieva | (Bulgaria) Boryana Kaleyn | (Bulgaria) Stiliana Nikolova |
| Brno | (Slovenia) Ekaterina Vedeneeva | (France) Lily Ramonatxo | (Israel) Michelle Segal |

==== Hoop ====
| Competitions | Gold | Silver | Bronze |
|---|---|---|---|
| Moscow | (Russia) Dina Averina | (Russia) Arina Averina | (Latvia) Jelizaveta Polstjanaja |
| Tartu | (Belarus) Alina Harnasko | (Estonia) Melany Keler | (Canada) Carmel Kallemaa |
| Marbella | (Bulgaria) Stiliana Nikolova | (Bulgaria) Eva Brezalieva | (France) Maelle Millet |
| Brno | (Slovenia) Ekaterina Vedeneeva | (Bulgaria) Tatyana Volozhanina | (Israel) Michelle Segal |

==== Ball ====
| Competitions | Gold | Silver | Bronze |
|---|---|---|---|
| Moscow | (Russia) Lala Kramarenko | (Russia) Arina Averina | (Latvia) Jelizaveta Polstjanaja |
| Tartu | (Belarus) Alina Harnasko | (Greece) Panagiota Lytra | (Canada) Carmel Kallemaa |
| Marbella | (Spain) Teresa Gorospe | (Bulgaria) Stiliana Nikolova | (Canada) Tatiana Cocsanova |
| Brno | (Slovenia) Ekaterina Vedeneeva | (Bulgaria) Tatyana Volozhanina | (France) Lily Ramonatxo |

==== Clubs ====
| Competitions | Gold | Silver | Bronze |
|---|---|---|---|
| Moscow | (Russia) Lala Kramarenko | (Kazakhstan) Elzhana Taniyeva | (Russia) Dina Averina |
| Tartu | (Greece) Panagiota Lytra | (Belarus) Alina Harnasko | (Canada) Carmel Kallemaa |
| Marbella | (Bulgaria) Stiliana Nikolova | (Bulgaria) Eva Brezalieva | (Kazakhstan) Elzhana Taniyeva |
| Brno | (Slovenia) Ekaterina Vedeneeva | (France) Lily Ramonatxo | (Israel) Michelle Segal |

==== Ribbon ====
| Competitions | Gold | Silver | Bronze |
|---|---|---|---|
| Moscow | (Russia) Dina Averina | (Russia) Lala Kramarenko | (Slovenia) Ekaterina Vedeneeva |
| Tartu | (Belarus) Alina Harnasko | (Belarus) Arina Krasnorutskaia | (Greece) Panagiota Lytra |
| Marbella | (Bulgaria) Eva Brezalieva | (Bulgaria) Boryana Kaleyn | (Canada) Tatiana Cocsanova |
| Brno | (Slovenia) Ekaterina Vedeneeva | (France) Lily Ramonatxo | (Kazakhstan) Sabina Bakatova |

== 2023 ==
=== Events ===
| Date | Event | Location | Ref. |
|---|---|---|---|
| February 25–26 | Miss Valentine Tartu Grand Prix 2023 | (Estonia) Tartu | |
| March 9–10 | Grand Prix Marbella 2023 | (Spain) Marbella | |
| April 8–9 | Grand Prix Thiais 2023 | (France) Thiais | |
| ~~April or June~~ | ~~Grand Prix Holon 2023~~; Canceled | ~~(Israel) Holon~~ | |
| June 3–4 | Grand Prix Brno Tart Cup 2023 | (Czech Republic) Brno | |

=== Medalists ===
==== Individual all-around ====
| Competitions | Gold | Silver | Bronze |
|---|---|---|---|
| Tartu | (Ukraine) Viktoriia Onopriienko | (Bulgaria) Stiliana Nikolova | (Ukraine) Polina Horodnycha |
| Marbella | (Italy) Sofia Raffaeli | (Bulgaria) Stiliana Nikolova | (Bulgaria) Eva Brezalieva |
| Thiais | (France) Hélène Karbanov | (Azerbaijan) Zohra Aghamirova | (Hungary) Fanni Pigniczki |
| Brno | (Ukraine) Khrystyna Pohranychna | (Bulgaria) Lachezara Pekova | (Ukraine) Polina Horodnycha |

==== Hoop ====
| Competitions | Gold | Silver | Bronze |
|---|---|---|---|
| Tartu | (Ukraine) Viktoriia Onopriienko | (Kazakhstan) Elzhana Taniyeva | (Bulgaria) Eva Brezalieva |
| Marbella | (Ukraine) Viktoriia Onopriienko | (Bulgaria) Eva Brezalieva | (Bulgaria) Stiliana Nikolova |
| Thiais | (Hungary) Fanni Pigniczki | (Azerbaijan) Zohra Aghamirova | (Spain) Polina Berezina |
| Brno | (Germany) Melanie Dargel | (Ukraine) Khrystyna Pohranychna | (France) Lily Ramonatxo |

==== Ball ====
| Competitions | Gold | Silver | Bronze |
|---|---|---|---|
| Tartu | (Bulgaria) Stiliana Nikolova | (Bulgaria) Tatyana Volozhanina | (Ukraine) Viktoriia Onopriienko |
| Marbella | (Bulgaria) Stiliana Nikolova | (Bulgaria) Eva Brezalieva | (Kazakhstan) Elzhana Taniyeva |
| Thiais | (Spain) Polina Berezina | (Azerbaijan) Zohra Aghamirova | (Spain) Alba Bautista |
| Brno | (Ukraine) Khrystyna Pohranychna | (Bulgaria) Lachezara Pekova | (Hungary) Eva Blanka Gyulai |

==== Clubs ====
| Competitions | Gold | Silver | Bronze |
|---|---|---|---|
| Tartu | (Bulgaria) Stiliana Nikolova | (Ukraine) Viktoriia Onopriienko | (Bulgaria) Boryana Kaleyn |
| Marbella | (Bulgaria) Stiliana Nikolova | (Italy) Sofia Raffaeli | (Ukraine) Polina Horodnycha |
| Thiais | (Azerbaijan) Zohra Aghamirova | (Hungary) Fanni Pigniczki | (United States) Alexandria Kautzman |
| Brno | (Ukraine) Khrystyna Pohranychna | (Ukraine) Polina Horodnycha | (Spain) Cristina Korniychuk |

==== Ribbon ====
| Competitions | Gold | Silver | Bronze |
|---|---|---|---|
| Tartu | (Bulgaria) Boryana Kaleyn | (Ukraine) Viktoriia Onopriienko | (Ukraine) Polina Horodnycha |
| Marbella | (Italy) Sofia Raffaeli | (Spain) Alba Bautista | (Bulgaria) Stiliana Nikolova |
| Thiais | (Brazil) Bárbara Domingos | (Hungary) Fanni Pigniczki | (France) Hélène Karbanov |
| Brno | (Ukraine) Khrystyna Pohranychna | (Ukraine) Polina Horodnycha | (Bulgaria) Lachezara Pekova |

== See also ==
- List of medalists at the Rhythmic Gymnastics Grand Prix circuit (1994–2003)
- List of medalists at the Rhythmic Gymnastics Grand Prix circuit (2004–2013)
- List of medalists at the Rhythmic Gymnastics Grand Prix circuit (2024–2033)
