= Polina Khonina =

Russian rhythmic gymnast

- Full name: Polina Sergeevna Khonina
- Nickname: Polya
- Born: 15 December 1998 (age 27) Kirov, Kirov Oblast, Russia

Gymnastics career
- Discipline: Rhythmic gymnastics
- Country represented: Russia (2014-2019)
- Club: Burtasy, Penza
- Gym: Novogorsk
- Head coach: Irina Viner
- Assistant coach: Natalia Gorbulina
- Choreographer: Olga Stebeneva
- Retired: 2019 (due to back injury)
Medal record
Representing Russia
Rhythmic Gymnastics
Grand Prix Final
Bronze medal – third place	2018 Marbella	Clubs
Bronze medal – third place	2018 Marbella	Ribbon

Polina Sergeyevna Khonina (Russian: Полина Сергеевна Хонина, born December 15, 1998, in Kirov, Russia) is a retired Russian individual rhythmic gymnast. She is now working as a coach and has coached gymnasts from national team of Korea, Hong Kong, Denmark and The Netherlands.

== Personal life ==
Polina's idols in rhythmic gymnastics are Yevgeniya Kanayeva and Margarita Mamun. Her favourite gymnasts during her childhood were Oxana Kostina, Kateryna Serebrianska and Larissa Loukianenko. Her favourite apparatus is a ball. Polina always wanted to become a trainer in rhythmic gymnastics. She is the Master of Sports of International Class.

== Career ==
Khonina was a member of the Russian National Reserve Team since 2014, and was moved to the Russian National Team in 2018.

She won all-around in the Russian Rhythmic Gymnastics Cup in 2016.

She finished 9th in the all-around at the 2016 Russian Championships and 4th at the 2017 Russian Championships. She won the bronze medal in clubs and the bronze medal in ribbon at the 2017 Russian Championships.

Khonina made her breakthrough in the 2017 Season. She won two bronze medals at the 2017 Russian Championships with clubs and ribbon.

She debuted in the Grand Prix series at the 2017 Kiev Grand Prix where she won the all-around gold medal ahead of teammate Iuliia Bravikova, she also qualified to all apparatus finals winning 3 silver medals in ribbon, clubs, ball and finished 4th in hoop.

On June 2–4 Khonina competed at her first World Challenge Cup at the 2017 Guadalajara World Cup where she won the gold medal in the all-around ahead of teammate Ekaterina Selezneva, she qualified to all apparatus finals taking gold medals in ball, clubs, finished 4th in ribbon and 8th in hoop.

On June 23–25 Khonina competed at the 2017 Grand Prix Holon finishing 5th in the all-around. On October 20–22 she competed at the 2017 Brno Grand Prix where she won the silver medal in the all-around and she also qualified to all apparatus finals winning 3 silver medals in hoop, ball and clubs and the bronze medal in ribbon.

In 2018, Khonina started the season with a competition at the 2018 Moscow Grand Prix finishing 7th in the all-around behind Japan's Sumire Kita, she qualified into the clubs and ribbon finals. On March March 24–25, Khonina finished 8th in the all-around at the 2018 Thiais Grand Prix. On May 11–13, Khonina competed at the 2018 Portimao World Challenge Cup where she won bronze in the all-around behind Nicol Zelikman, she qualified in all apparatus finals taking 2 silver in medals with ball, clubs, a bronze with hoop and finished 5th in ribbon.

== Routine music information ==
Year	Apparatus	Music title
2018	Hoop	Professional by Samvel Yervinyan
2018	Ball	Ti Na Svete Est' (Ты на свете есть) by Mark Minkov, Alla Pugacheva
2018	Clubs	First Be A Woman by Gloria Gaynor
2018	Ribbon	New York Tango/ Opale concerto troisième movement by Richard Galliano
2017	Hoop	La forza del destino by Giuseppe Verdi
2017	Ball	Liebesträume by Daniel Barenboim
2017	Clubs	Concierto de Aranjuez by Herb Alpert
2017	Ribbon	Mademoiselle chante le blues by Patricia Kaas
