= Nicol Zelikman =

Israeli rhythmic gymnast

- ניקול זליקמן
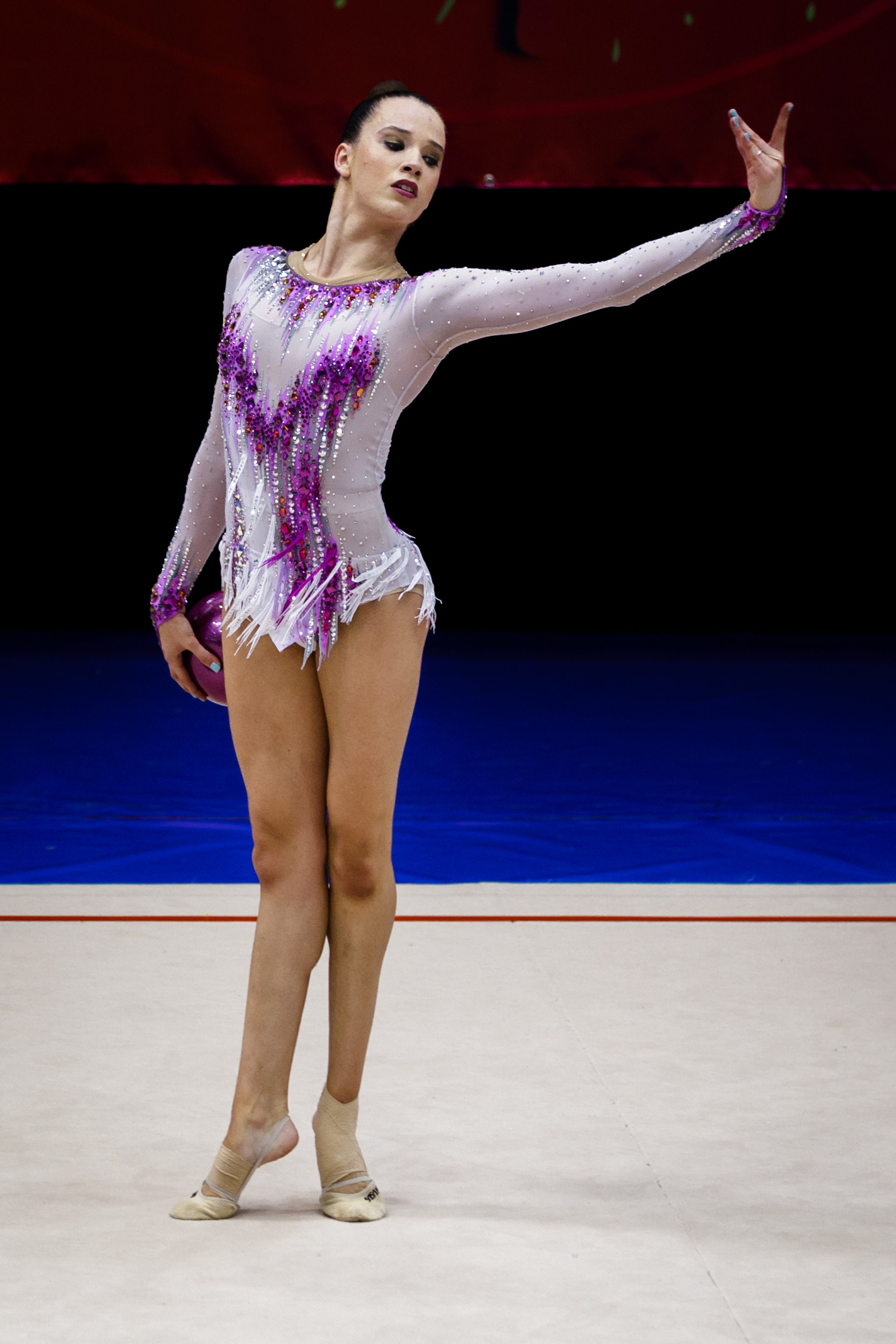
- Nicol Zelikman in 2019

Personal information
- Full name: Nicol Zelikman Ovadia
- Born: January 30, 2001 (age 25) Kfar Saba, Israel
- Height: 173 cm (5 ft 8 in)

Gymnastics career
- Discipline: Rhythmic gymnastics
- Country represented: Israel; (2014-2022)
- Club: Maccabi Tel Aviv
- Head coach: Ella Samofalov
- Assistant coach: Elena Zelikman
- Retired: yes
- World ranking: 9 WC 8 WCC (2019); 17 WC 5 WCC (2018); 10 WC (2017 Season)
Medal record
Representing Israel
Rhythmic gymnastics
World Championships
Silver medal – second place	2019 Baku	Team
European Championships
Bronze medal – third place	2019 Baku	Hoop
Bronze medal – third place	2021 Varna	Team
Junior European Championships
Silver medal – second place	2016 Holon	Hoop
Bronze medal – third place	2016 Holon	Ball
Bronze medal – third place	2015 Minsk	Group All-around

Nicol Zelikman (Hebrew: ניקול זליקמן; born January 30, 2001) is a former Israeli individual rhythmic gymnast. She is a two-time medalist at the 2016 European Junior Championships.

== Personal life ==
Zelikman was born and raised in Kfar Saba, Israel. Her grandparents, father, and mother were born in Baku, Soviet Azerbaijan. They had lived there, met and married; and in 1993 they moved to Russia, and then immigrated to Israel. She has a twin brother and two older brothers.

She was introduced to rhythmic gymnastics by her mother; Elena "Lena" Zelikman, who is also her personal assistant coach. In 2019, Zelikman was enlisted to the Israel Defense Forces, but also continued practicing professionally. Her head coach was Ella Samofalov.

She got married in later 2025 and gave birth to a baby boy on 17 August 2026.

In February 2022, Zelikman announced her retirement from rhythmic gymnastics to study advertising and marketing communication at Ono Academic College.

== Rhythmic gymnastics career ==
=== Junior ===
Zelikman began appearing in international junior competitions in 2012; at the Miss Valentine and Vitry Cup. She has competed in numerous competitions since 2014 at the Junior Grand Prix and World Cup series. In 2015, Zelikman competed at the Yoldyz Cup in Kazan. Zelikman finished 4th in team and won silver in hoop, bronze in ball at the 2016 Moscow Junior Grand Prix. She won silver in ball and 4th in rope at the 2016 Lisboa Junior World Cup. Zelikman competed at the 2016 European Junior Championships where Israel finished 4th in Team event, she qualified in 2 apparatus finals where she won silver in hoop and bronze in ball.

=== Senior ===
In 2017 season Zelikman made her senior debut at the Moscow International tournament where she won the all-around bronze medal. On March 24–26, Zelikamn competed at the Thiais Grand Prix finishing 7th in the all-around, she qualified to 3 event finals placing 5th in ribbon and 6th in hoop, clubs. On March 31 - April 2, Zelikman competed at the 2017 Grand Prix Marbella finishing 5th in the all-around and qualified to all the apparatus finals. On April 7–9, Zelikman competed in her first World Cup event at the 2017 Pesaro World Cup finishing 10th in the all-around and qualified in the Clubs final finishing in 4th place. Her next competition was at the 2017 Baku World Cup where she finished 8th in the all-around and qualified in the hoop final. On May 5–7, Zelikman competed at the 2017 Sofia World Cup finishing 6th in the all-around behind Katsiaryna Halkina of Belarus, she qualified in 2 apparatus finals and finished 5th in clubs and 6th in ribbon. Zelikman suffered an arm injury where she broke 2 bones which will require a surgery, thus she was not selected to compete at the European Championships.

In 2018, Zelikman returned to competition at the 2018 Grand Prix Thiais finishing 6th in the all-around behind Arina Averina, she qualified in 3 apparatus finals taking silver in ball, finished 4th in ribbon and 5th in clubs. On April 6–8, she won the gold medal in the all-around at the MTM Ljubljana tournament. On April 20–22, at the 2018 Tashkent World Cup, Zelikman finished 5th in the all-around, she qualified in all the apparatus finals: finishing 4th in ball, clubs and 7th in hoop, ribbon. On May 4–6, she then competed at the 2018 Guadalajara World Challenge Cup finishing 11th in the all-around, she qualified into the ball final where she won her first world cup medal, a bronze behind Italian Milena Baldassarri. On May 11–13, Zelikman continued her success at the 2018 Portimao World Challenge Cup, where she won silver in the all-around behind Russia's Maria Sergeeva, she qualified in all apparatus finals and won gold in ball, silver in hoop, bronze in clubs and finished 7th in ribbon.

In 2019, during the European Championships which were held in Baku, Zelikman has won the bronze medal in hoop.

In 2021, Zelikman competed in the Baku World Cup, where she came in twenty-sixth place behind Chisaki Oiwa and seventh in the ball final. At the Pesaro World Cup, she came in sixth place behind Anastasia Salos and in the finals she was seventh in the hoop and fifth in ball. From June 9–13, she competed in the 2021 European Rhythmic Gymnastics Championships in Varna, Bulgaria, where she placed ninth in the individual overall final behind Sofía Raffaeli. In the apparatus finals, she placed eighth in ribbon and fifth in ball. The Israeli team also won the bronze medal which was represented by herself, Linoy Ashram and the Israeli group gymnasts. At the beginning of July, she returned to the Minsk Challenge World Cup, where she came in fifth place overall behind Daría Trubnikova. She also placed fifth in the hoop and ball and ribbon finals, and won bronze in clubs. Two weeks later, she participated in the Tel Aviv Grand Prix, in her home country - the last competition before the Tokyo Olympic Games. She finished fourth behind Anastasia Salos. She also gained fourth place in the hoop final, sixth in the ball and ribbon finals, and fifth in the club final. From August 6–8, Zelikman and her teammate, Linoy Ashram, competed in the individual competition of the Tokyo 2020 Olympic Games. Having made the top ten, both Zelikman (who finished seventh in qualifications) and Ashram (who finished third) advanced to the individual overall final. In the individual overall competition, Zelikman repeated the seventh place behind Milena Baldassarri. Ashram won the gold medal becoming the first athlete from a non-former Soviet country to do so at an Olympics. Following the Games, the Israeli Gymnastics Federation announced Zelikman has retired as an individual gymnast and will instead move to competing as a group rhythmic gymnast in the Israeli team.

In early 2022, she announced her retirement from competitive sport.

== Routine music information ==
Year	Apparatus	Music Title
2021	Hoop	Anya by Deep Purple
2021	Ball	Humanity by Scorpions
2021	Clubs	Devil Inside Me (feat. KARRA) by Kshmr Kazza
2021	Ribbon	Concerto De Espania by Michael Lides
2019	Hoop	Dark Avenger by Phantom Power Music
2019	Ball	When You Came Into My Life by Scorpions
2019	Clubs	The Look by The Baseballs
2019	Ribbon	Fantastic Beasts: The Crimes of Grindelwald main theme by James Newton Howard
2018	Hoop	Paint it Black by Ramin DJawadi
2018	Ball	Je n'attendais que vous by Garou
2018	Clubs	Proud Mary by Tina Turner
2018	Ribbon	Miserlou by Caroline Campbell, William Joseph & Tina Guo
2017	Hoop	The Children of Captain Grant (Ouverture) by Isaak Dunayevsky
2017	Ball	Si tu etais by Salvatore Adamo
2017	Clubs	Remains Of The Day by Danny Elfman
2017	Ribbon	?
2016	Hoop	Perdóname by David Civera
2016	Ball	And The Waltz Goes On by André Rieu
2016	Clubs	?
2016	Ribbon	?
2015	Hoop	Perdóname by David Civera
2015	Ball	And The Waltz Goes On by André Rieu
2015	Clubs	?
2015	Ribbon	?

== Detailed Olympic results ==
Year	Competition Description	Location	Music	Apparatus	Rank-Final	Score-Final	Rank-Qualifying	Score-Qualifying
2020	Olympics	Tokyo		All-around	7th	95.600	7th	95.900
2020	Olympics	Tokyo	Anya by Deep Purple	Hoop	10th	23.700	8th	24.350
2020	Olympics	Tokyo	Humanity by Scorpions	Ball	7th	24.150	9th	25.500
2020	Olympics	Tokyo	Devil Inside Me (feat. KARRA) by Kshmr Kazza	Clubs	8th	25.600	8th	24.950
2020	Olympics	Tokyo	Concerto De Espania by Michael Lides	Ribbon	5th	22.150	9th	21.100

== See also ==
- Sports in Israel
- Linoy Ashram
- List of medalists at the Rhythmic Gymnastics Junior European Championships
