= 2018 FIG Rhythmic Gymnastics World Cup series =

International rhythm gymnastics competition

The 2018 FIG World Cup circuit in Rhythmic Gymnastics is a series of competitions officially organized and promoted by the International Gymnastics Federation.

With stopovers in Europe and Asia, the World Cup competitions are scheduled for March 30–April 1 in Sofia (BUL), April 13-15 in Pesaro (ITA), April 20–22 in Tashkent (UZB), April 27–29 in Baku (AZE). World Challenge Cup competitions are scheduled for May 4-6 in Guadalajara (ESP), May 11–13 in Portimão (POR), August 17–19 in Minsk (BLR), and August 24–26 in Kazan (RUS).

== Formats ==
World Cup
Date	Event	Location	Type
March 30–April 1	FIG World Cup 2018	(Bulgaria) Sofia	Individuals and groups
April 13–15	FIG World Cup 2018	(Italy) Pesaro	Individuals and groups
April 20–22	FIG World Cup 2018	(Uzbekistan) Tashkent	Individuals and groups
April 27–29	FIG World Cup 2018	(Azerbaijan) Baku	Individuals and groups

World Challenge Cup
Date	Event	Location	Type
May 4–6	FIG World Challenge Cup 2018	(Spain) Guadalajara	Individuals and groups
May 11–13	FIG World Challenge Cup 2018	(Portugal) Portimão	Individuals and groups
August 17–19	FIG World Challenge Cup 2018	(Belarus) Minsk	Individuals and groups
August 24–26	FIG World Challenge Cup 2018	(Russia) Kazan	Individuals and groups

== Medal winners ==
=== All-around ===
==== Individual ====
Competitions	Gold	Silver	Bronze
World Cup
Sofia	(Russia) Aleksandra Soldatova	(Russia) Ekaterina Selezneva	(Israel) Linoy Ashram
Pesaro	(Russia) Dina Averina	(Bulgaria) Katrin Taseva	(Israel) Linoy Ashram
Tashkent	(Russia) Aleksandra Soldatova	(Israel) Linoy Ashram	(Russia) Ekaterina Selezneva
Baku	(Russia) Mariia Sergeeva	(Ukraine) Vlada Nikolchenko	(Belarus) Anastasiia Salos
World Challenge Cup
Guadalajara	(Israel) Linoy Ashram	(Russia) Aleksandra Soldatova	(Russia) Arina Averina
Portimão	(Russia) Mariia Sergeeva	(Israel) Nicol Zelikman	(Russia) Polina Khonina
Minsk	(Israel) Linoy Ashram	(Russia) Aleksandra Soldatova	(Belarus) Katsiaryna Halkina
Kazan	(Russia) Aleksandra Soldatova	(Russia) Dina Averina	(Israel) Linoy Ashram

==== Group ====
Competitions	Gold	Silver	Bronze
World Cup
Sofia	Bulgaria	Japan	Italy
Pesaro	Italy	Belarus	Russia
Tashkent	Russia	Belarus	Estonia
Baku	Italy	Bulgaria	Japan
World Challenge Cup
Guadalajara	Bulgaria	Italy	Russia
Portimão	China	Finland	Azerbaijan
Minsk	Italy	Russia	Japan
Kazan	Italy	Russia	Bulgaria

=== Apparatus ===
==== Hoop ====
Competitions	Gold	Silver	Bronze
World Cup
Sofia	(Russia) Aleksandra Soldatova	(Bulgaria) Katrin Taseva	(Bulgaria) Boryana Kaleyn
Pesaro	(Russia) Arina Averina	(Russia) Dina Averina	(Bulgaria) Katrin Taseva
Tashkent	(Russia) Aleksandra Soldatova	(Israel) Linoy Ashram	(Bulgaria) Boryana Kaleyn
Baku	(Russia) Mariia Sergeeva	(Belarus) Katsiaryna Halkina	(United States) Laura Zeng
World Challenge Cup
Guadalajara	(Russia) Arina Averina	(Israel) Linoy Ashram	(Belarus) Anastasiia Salos
Portimão	(Russia) Mariia Sergeeva	(Israel) Nicol Zelikman	(Russia) Polina Khonina
Minsk	(Belarus) Katsiaryna Halkina	(Russia) Aleksandra Soldatova	(Ukraine) Vlada Nikolchenko
Kazan	(Russia) Dina Averina	(Israel) Linoy Ashram	(Bulgaria) Boryana Kaleyn

==== Ball ====
Competitions	Gold	Silver	Bronze
World Cup
Sofia	(Russia) Aleksandra Soldatova	(Russia) Ekaterina Selezneva	(Bulgaria) Katrin Taseva
Pesaro	(Russia) Dina Averina	(Israel) Linoy Ashram	(Belarus) Anastasiia Salos
Tashkent	(Russia) Aleksandra Soldatova	(Israel) Linoy Ashram	(Russia) Ekaterina Selezneva
Baku	(Russia) Ekaterina Selezneva	(Russia) Mariia Sergeeva	(Japan) Kaho Minagawa
World Challenge Cup
Guadalajara	(Israel) Linoy Ashram	(Italy) Milena Baldassarri	(Israel) Nicol Zelikman
Portimão	(Israel) Nicol Zelikman	(Russia) Polina Khonina	(Russia) Mariia Sergeeva
Minsk	(Russia) Ekaterina Selezneva	(Belarus) Anastasiia Salos	(Israel) Linoy Ashram
Kazan	(Russia) Dina Averina	(Israel) Linoy Ashram	(Russia) Aleksandra Soldatova

==== Clubs ====
Competitions	Gold	Silver	Bronze
World Cup
Sofia	(Bulgaria) Katrin Taseva	(Ukraine) Vlada Nikolchenko	(Russia) Aleksandra Soldatova
Pesaro	(Israel) Linoy Ashram	(Ukraine) Vlada Nikolchenko	(Bulgaria) Katrin Taseva
Tashkent	(Russia) Aleksandra Soldatova	(Uzbekistan) Sabina Tashkenbaeva	(Israel) Linoy Ashram
Baku	(Ukraine) Vlada Nikolchenko	(Bulgaria) Boryana Kaleyn	(Russia) Mariia Sergeeva
World Challenge Cup
Guadalajara	(Russia) Arina Averina	(Russia) Aleksandra Soldatova	(Italy) Milena Baldassarri
Portimão	(Russia) Mariia Sergeeva	(Russia) Polina Khonina	(Israel) Nicol Zelikman
Minsk	(Israel) Linoy Ashram	(Russia) Aleksandra Soldatova	(Belarus) Anastasiia Salos
Kazan	(Russia) Dina Averina	(Israel) Linoy Ashram	(Russia) Aleksandra Soldatova

==== Ribbon ====
Competitions	Gold	Silver	Bronze
World Cup
Sofia	(Israel) Linoy Ashram	(Bulgaria) Katrin Taseva	(Russia) Ekaterina Selezneva
Pesaro	(Russia) Dina Averina	(Bulgaria) Katrin Taseva	(Russia) Arina Averina
Tashkent	(Russia) Aleksandra Soldatova	(Israel) Linoy Ashram	(Russia) Ekaterina Selezneva
Baku	(Russia) Mariia Sergeeva	(Bulgaria) Katrin Taseva	(Ukraine) Vlada Nikolchenko
World Challenge Cup
Guadalajara	(Russia) Aleksandra Soldatova	(Israel) Linoy Ashram	(Russia) Arina Averina
Portimão	(Russia) Mariia Sergeeva	(Japan) Kaho Minagawa	(Italy) Alessia Russo
Minsk	(Russia) Aleksandra Soldatova	(Bulgaria) Neviana Vladinova	(Belarus) Katsiaryna Halkina
Kazan	(Russia) Dina Averina	(Israel) Linoy Ashram	(Russia) Aleksandra Soldatova

==== 5 hoops ====
Competitions	Gold	Silver	Bronze
World Cup
Sofia	Bulgaria	Japan	Italy
Pesaro	Italy	China	Israel
Tashkent	Russia	Ukraine	Belarus
Baku	Bulgaria	Italy	Azerbaijan
World Challenge Cup
Guadalajara	Italy	Bulgaria	Belarus
Portimão	China	Azerbaijan	Finland
Minsk	Italy	Russia	Belarus
Kazan	Russia	Bulgaria	Italy

==== 3 balls and 2 ropes ====
Competitions	Gold	Silver	Bronze
World Cup
Sofia	Japan	Italy	Bulgaria
Pesaro	Italy	Russia	China
Tashkent	Russia	Israel	Ukraine
Baku	Bulgaria	Japan	Ukraine
World Challenge Cup
Guadalajara	Bulgaria	Italy	Azerbaijan
Portimão	Azerbaijan	China	Finland
Minsk	Japan	Russia	Belarus
Kazan	Russia	Italy	Japan

== Overall medal table ==
Rank	Nation	Gold	Silver	Bronze	Total
1	Russia (RUS)	35	17	17	69
2	Italy (ITA)	8	6	5	19
3	Israel (ISR)	7	14	8	29
4	Bulgaria (BUL)	7	10	8	25
5	Japan (JPN)	2	4	4	10
6	China (CHN)	2	2	1	5
7	Belarus (BLR)	1	4	10	15
8	Ukraine (UKR)	1	4	4	9
9	Azerbaijan (AZE)	1	1	3	5
10	Finland (FIN)	0	1	2	3
11	Uzbekistan (UZB)	0	1	0	1
12	Estonia (EST)	0	0	1	1
12	United States (USA)	0	0	1	1
Totals (13 entries)		64	64	64	192

== See also ==
- 2018 FIG Artistic Gymnastics World Cup series
- 2018 Rhythmic Gymnastics Grand Prix circuit
