= 2019 FIG Rhythmic Gymnastics World Cup series =

International rhythm gymnastics competition

The 2019 FIG World Cup circuit in Rhythmic Gymnastics is a series of competitions officially organized and promoted by the International Gymnastics Federation.

With stopovers in Europe and Asia, the World Cup competitions are scheduled for April 5–7 in Pesaro (ITA), April 12–14 in Sofia (BUL), April 19–21 in Tashkent (UZB), April 26–28 in Baku (AZE). World Challenge Cup competitions are scheduled for May 3–5 in Guadalajara (ESP), August 16–18 in Minsk (BLR), August 26–28 in Cluj Napoca (ROU), August 30–September 1 in Kazan (RUS), September 6–8 in Portimão (POR).

== Formats ==
World Cup
Date	Event	Location	Type
April 5–7	FIG World Cup 2019	(Italy) Pesaro	Individuals and groups
April 12–14	FIG World Cup 2019	(Bulgaria) Sofia	Individuals and groups
April 19–21	FIG World Cup 2019	(Uzbekistan) Tashkent	Individuals and groups
April 26–28	FIG World Cup 2019	(Azerbaijan) Baku	Individuals and groups

World Challenge Cup
May 3–5	FIG World Challenge Cup 2019	(Spain) Guadalajara	Individuals and groups
August 16–18	FIG World Challenge Cup 2019	(Belarus) Minsk	Individuals and groups
August 23–25	FIG World Challenge Cup 2019	(Romania) Cluj Napoca	Individuals and groups
August 30–September 1	FIG World Challenge Cup 2019	(Russia) Kazan	Individuals and groups
September 6–8	FIG World Challenge Cup 2019	(Portugal) Portimão	Individuals and groups

== Medal winners ==
=== All-around ===
==== Individual ====
Competitions	Gold	Silver	Bronze
World Cup
Pesaro	(Russia) Dina Averina	(Russia) Arina Averina	(Bulgaria) Boryana Kaleyn
Sofia	(Russia) Aleksandra Soldatova	(Israel) Linoy Ashram	(Bulgaria) Katrin Taseva
Tashkent	(Russia) Aleksandra Soldatova	(Bulgaria) Boryana Kaleyn	(Russia) Anastasia Guzenkova
Baku	(Russia) Dina Averina	(Russia) Arina Averina	(Ukraine) Vlada Nikolchenko
World Challenge Cup
Guadalajara	(Russia) Aleksandra Soldatova	(Russia) Ekaterina Selezneva	(Italy) Alexandra Agiurgiuculese
Minsk	(Russia) Dina Averina	(Russia) Arina Averina	(Israel) Linoy Ashram
Cluj Napoca	(Israel) Linoy Ashram	(Russia) Ekaterina Selezneva	(Israel) Nicol Zelikman
Kazan	(Russia) Dina Averina	(Russia) Arina Averina	(Bulgaria) Katrin Taseva
Portimão	(Russia) Aleksandra Soldatova	(Italy) Milena Baldassarri	(Belarus) Alina Harnasko

==== Group ====
Competitions	Gold	Silver	Bronze
World Cup
Pesaro	Russia	Bulgaria	Italy
Sofia	Bulgaria	Italy	Japan
Tashkent	Russia	Uzbekistan	Ukraine
Baku	Japan	Russia	Bulgaria
World Challenge Cup
Guadalajara	Italy	Bulgaria	Russia
Minsk	Russia	Bulgaria	Belarus
Cluj Napoca	Israel	Azerbaijan	Ukraine
Kazan	Russia	Bulgaria	Italy
Portimão	Italy	Japan	Belarus

=== Apparatus ===
==== Hoop ====
Competitions	Gold	Silver	Bronze
World Cup
Pesaro	(Russia) Arina Averina	(Russia) Dina Averina	(Belarus) Katsiaryna Halkina
Sofia	(Israel) Linoy Ashram	(Russia) Ekaterina Selezneva	(Russia) Aleksandra Soldatova
Tashkent	(Russia) Aleksandra Soldatova	(Russia) Anastasia Guzenkova	(Ukraine) Vlada Nikolchenko
Baku	(Russia) Dina Averina	(Israel) Linoy Ashram	(United States) Laura Zeng
World Challenge Cup
Guadalajara	(Russia) Aleksandra Soldatova	(Ukraine) Khrystyna Pohranychna	(Russia) Ekaterina Selezneva
Minsk	(Israel) Linoy Ashram	(Russia) Arina Averina	(Russia) Dina Averina
Cluj Napoca	(Israel) Linoy Ashram	(Russia) Ekaterina Selezneva	(Israel) Nicol Zelikman
Kazan	(Russia) Arina Averina	(Russia) Dina Averina	(Belarus) Alina Harnasko
Portimão	(Italy) Alexandra Agiurgiuculese	(Belarus) Anastasiia Salos	(Belarus) Alina Harnasko

==== Ball ====
Competitions	Gold	Silver	Bronze
World Cup
Pesaro	(Russia) Arina Averina	(Bulgaria) Boryana Kaleyn	(Russia) Dina Averina
Sofia	(Russia) Ekaterina Selezneva	(Bulgaria) Katrin Taseva	(Israel) Linoy Ashram
Tashkent	(Russia) Aleksandra Soldatova	(Bulgaria) Boryana Kaleyn	(Russia) Anastasia Guzenkova
Baku	(Israel) Linoy Ashram	(Russia) Dina Averina	(Belarus) Katsiaryna Halkina
World Challenge Cup
Guadalajara	(Russia) Aleksandra Soldatova	(Ukraine) Yeva Meleshchuk	(Italy) Alexandra Agiurgiuculese
Minsk	(Russia) Dina Averina	(Russia) Arina Averina	(Israel) Linoy Ashram
Cluj Napoca	(Russia) Ekaterina Selezneva	(Russia) Daria Trubnikova	(Israel) Nicol Zelikman
Kazan	(Russia) Dina Averina	(Russia) Arina Averina	(Bulgaria) Boryana Kaleyn
Portimão	(Italy) Milena Baldassarri	(Italy) Alexandra Agiurgiuculese	(Russia) Alexandra Soldatova

==== Clubs ====
Competitions	Gold	Silver	Bronze
World Cup
Pesaro	(Russia) Dina Averina	(Italy) Alexandra Agiurgiuculese	(Belarus) Alina Harnasko
Sofia	(Israel) Linoy Ashram	(Bulgaria) Katrin Taseva	(Russia) Aleksandra Soldatova
Tashkent	(Russia) Aleksandra Soldatova	(Bulgaria) Neviana Vladinova	(Ukraine) Vlada Nikolchenko
Baku	(Russia) Dina Averina	(Russia) Arina Averina	(Ukraine) Vlada Nikolchenko
World Challenge Cup
Guadalajara	(Russia) Aleksandra Soldatova	(Italy) Alexandra Agiurgiuculese	(Russia) Ekaterina Selezneva
Minsk	(Russia) Dina Averina	(Israel) Linoy Ashram	(Russia) Arina Averina
Cluj Napoca	(Ukraine) Vlada Nikolchenko	(Israel) Linoy Ashram	(Romania) Denisa Mailat
Kazan	(Russia) Dina Averina	(Russia) Arina Averina	(Belarus) Alina Harnasko
Portimão	(Italy) Alexandra Agiurgiuculese	(Italy) Milena Baldassarri	(Belarus) Anastasiia Salos

==== Ribbon ====
Competitions	Gold	Silver	Bronze
World Cup
Pesaro	(Russia) Dina Averina	(Bulgaria) Katrin Taseva	(Belarus) Alina Harnasko
Sofia	(Russia) Aleksandra Soldatova	(Bulgaria) Katrin Taseva	(Israel) Linoy Ashram
Tashkent	(Russia) Anastasia Guzenkova	(Bulgaria) Boryana Kaleyn	(Slovenia) Ekaterina Vedeneeva
Baku	(Belarus) Anastasiia Salos	(Russia) Arina Averina	(Russia) Dina Averina
World Challenge Cup
Guadalajara	(Russia) Aleksandra Soldatova	(Russia) Ekaterina Selezneva	(Italy) Alexandra Agiurgiuculese
Minsk	(Russia) Dina Averina	(Russia) Arina Averina	(Italy) Milena Baldassarri
Cluj Napoca	(Israel) Linoy Ashram	(Italy) Alexandra Agiurgiuculese	(Israel) Nicol Zelikman
Kazan	(Russia) Dina Averina	(Russia) Arina Averina	(Belarus) Katsiaryna Halkina
Portimão	(Italy) Milena Baldassarri	(Ukraine) Yeva Meleshchuk	(United States) Camilla Feeley

==== 5 balls ====
Competitions	Gold	Silver	Bronze
World Cup
Pesaro	Italy	Russia	Japan
Sofia	Belarus	Japan	Russia
Tashkent	Ukraine	Israel	Russia
Baku	Russia	Japan	Ukraine
World Challenge Cup
Guadalajara	Russia	Italy	Bulgaria
Minsk	Italy	Russia	Bulgaria
Cluj Napoca	Ukraine	Azerbaijan	Israel
Kazan	Russia	Bulgaria	Japan
Portimão	Italy	Japan	Belarus

==== 4 clubs and 3 hoops ====
Competitions	Gold	Silver	Bronze
World Cup
Pesaro	Bulgaria	Ukraine	Israel
Sofia	Ukraine	Bulgaria	Japan
Tashkent	Russia	Ukraine	Israel
Baku	Bulgaria	Russia	Ukraine
World Challenge Cup
Guadalajara	Bulgaria	Russia	Italy
Minsk	Bulgaria	Belarus	Ukraine
Cluj Napoca	Ukraine	Israel	Azerbaijan
Kazan	Bulgaria	Russia	Israel
Portimão	Belarus	Italy	Japan

== Overall medal table ==
Rank	Nation	Gold	Silver	Bronze	Total
1	Russia (RUS)	40	28	14	82
2	Italy (ITA)	9	9	7	25
3	Israel (ISR)	8	6	12	26
4	Bulgaria (BUL)	6	15	7	28
5	Ukraine (UKR)	5	5	9	19
6	Belarus (BLR)	3	2	13	18
7	Japan (JPN)	1	4	5	10
8	Azerbaijan (AZE)	0	2	1	3
9	Uzbekistan (UZB)	0	1	0	1
10	United States (USA)	0	0	2	2
11	Romania (ROU)	0	0	1	1
11	Slovenia (SLO)	0	0	1	1
Totals (12 entries)		72	72	72	216

== See also ==
- 2019 Rhythmic Gymnastics World Championships
- 2019 FIG Artistic Gymnastics World Cup series
- 2019 Rhythmic Gymnastics Grand Prix circuit
