= Jelizaveta Polstjanaja =

Latvian rhythmic gymnast

Jeļizaveta Polstjanaja
- Born: 12 March 2003 (age 23) Jūrmala, Latvia

Gymnastics career
- Discipline: Rhythmic gymnastics
- Country represented: Latvia
- Club: Rīgas vingrošanas skola
- Head coaches: Natālija Orlova, Gaļina Marjina
- Retired: yes
Medal record
Representing Latvia
Rhythmic gymnastics
Event	1st	2nd	3rd
FIG World Cup	0	1	2
Grand Prix	0	0	2
Total	0	1	4

Jeļizaveta Polstjanaja (born 12 March 2003) is a Latvian retired rhythmic gymnast. She is a Latvian national champion.

== Personal life ==
Polstjanaja was born in Jūrmala, Latvia, to Russian parents; her parents lived in Russia but traveled to Latvia often, and her godparents are Latvian. She has a younger sister. Several relatives of her were athletes: her grandfather was a professional hockey player, while her mother was also a rhythmic gymnast, and her father participated in several marine sports. Polstjanaja initially trained in synchronized swimming before switching to rhythmic gymnastics.

In 2018, Polstjanaja received Latvian citizenship for special merit and started competing for Latvia. She speaks Latvian, Russian, and English.

== Career ==
Polstjanaja began rhythmic gymnastics at the age of 7 in Moscow, Russia after seeing Evgeniya Kanaeva performing on television.

She initially competed in Russia as a junior gymnast. In 2016, she performed at a competition in Riga, although as she was not a member of the Russian national team, her score was not counted in the competition ranking. At the competition, she was approached by officials from Israel and Latvia seeking to recruit her, and her family decided on Latvia, which she began representing in spring 2018. She continued to train in Moscow, as there were better training conditions there, as well as in Latvia with another coach, and she participated in national training camps in Latvia.

=== 2018 ===
Polstjanaja participated in the Junior European Championship 2018 in Guadalajara, Spain.

=== 2019 ===
Polstjanaja was second in the all-around at the Latvian championships and won all four apparatus finals.

She competed at the European Championships in Baku, Azerbaijan and placed 8th in the all-around, a result she was "very happy" with. In September, she competed at the 2019 World Championships, also held in Baku, where she placed 32nd and did not advance to the top 24 all-around final. She also placed 26th in the team event with her Latvian teammates Alīna Baklagina and Karolīna Mizūne.

A month later, Polstjanaja ruptured a ligament in her ankle, but she continued to train and compete. She won the Latvian championship in December.

=== 2020 ===
Polstjanaja won her first senior medal at the Grand Prix stage in Brno, a bronze in the clubs final. Shortly afterward, the COVID-19 pandemic began, shutting down training halls and competitions. She continued to train at home.

In November, Polstjanaja participated in the European Championships in Kyiv, Ukraine, where she took 15th place in the all-around.

=== 2021 ===
Polstjanaja competed at all four stages of the 2021 World Cup series and reached two apparatus finals at the stage in Tashkent. Next, she competed at the 2021 European Championships, where she finished in 26th place after making mistakes, meaning that she did not advance to the all-around final and missed her last chance to win the Olympic quota for the 2020 Summer Olympics available there. While competing, she also suffered a serious hip injury, but she continued on to compete at two World Challenge Cups in July in Minsk and Moscow. At the Moscow stage, she was 4th in the all-around behind Ekaterina Vedeneeva and won bronze in the hoop final; this was the first time a Latvian gymnast had won a medal on the World Cup series.

At the 2021 World Championships, she qualified for the all-around final and placed 15th.

=== 2022 ===
Polstjanaja won two more medals on the 2022 World Cup circuit: a bronze in the hoop final in Pesaro, and a silver in the clubs final in Baku. At the stage in Tashkent, she was 5th in the all-around.

Her last competition was the 2022 European Championships in Tel Aviv. She finished 12th in the all-around final and reached the hoop final, where she placed 4th.

After this competition, she had conflicts with the Latvian Olympic Committee. Polstjanaja claimed that she received an ultimatum saying that in the wake of the Russian invasion of Ukraine, she must give up her Russian citizenship or be expelled from the national team. The Latvian Olympic Committee disputed her account and said that dual-nationals of Russia or Belarus could not apply for state funding, including Latvian Olympic Unit funding, but that she was not prevented from competing under the Latvian flag if she wanted to self-fund her costs for training and competing.

Polstjanaja said that because she still had close family and friends living in Russia, she could not renounce her citizenship. Although the Latvian Gymnastics Federation offered her the chance to compete at the 2022 World Championships with her own funding, she refused due to a poor mental state and said that she did not see a point in continuing to compete for Latvia. She also said that she had followed previous stipulations that she must not train in Russia and that she was grateful to those who had assisted her in Latvia. In October, she announced that she had finished her competitive career and would begin working as a coach.

== Routine music information ==
Year	Apparatus	Music title
2019	Hoop	Bolero by Dmitriy Khvorostovskiy
2019	Ball	Main Theme from Ladies in Lavender by Nigel Hess & Joshua Bell
2019	Clubs	Lolo by Sevda Alekper Zadeh
2019	Ribbon	Malagueña Salerosa by Chingón
2020	Hoop (first)	Bolero by Dmitriy Khvorostovskiy
2020	Hoop (second)	The Tsar's Bride: Overture by Евгений Светланов, Оркестр Большого театра
2020	Ball (first)	Main Theme from Ladies in Lavender by Nigel Hess & Joshua Bell
2020	Ball (second)	Theme From Schindler's List (Reprise) by John Williams
2020	Clubs	Raganu Nakts by Tautumeitas
2020	Ribbon	Hey Momma / Hit the Road Jack by Pentatonix
2021	Hoop	The Tsar's Bride: Overture by Евгений Светланов, Оркестр Большого театра
2021	Ball	Theme From Schindler's List (Reprise) by John Williams
2021	Clubs	Raganu Nakts by Tautumeitas
2021	Ribbon	Bolero by Dmitriy Khvorostovskiy
2022	Hoop	Jimmy Shake by Apashe
2022	Ball	Doin' Time by Lana Del Rey
2022	Clubs	Queen of the Night (Film Version) by Whitney Houston
2022	Ribbon	Grande Amore by Il Volo
