= Vlada Nikolchenko =

Ukrainian rhythmic gymnast

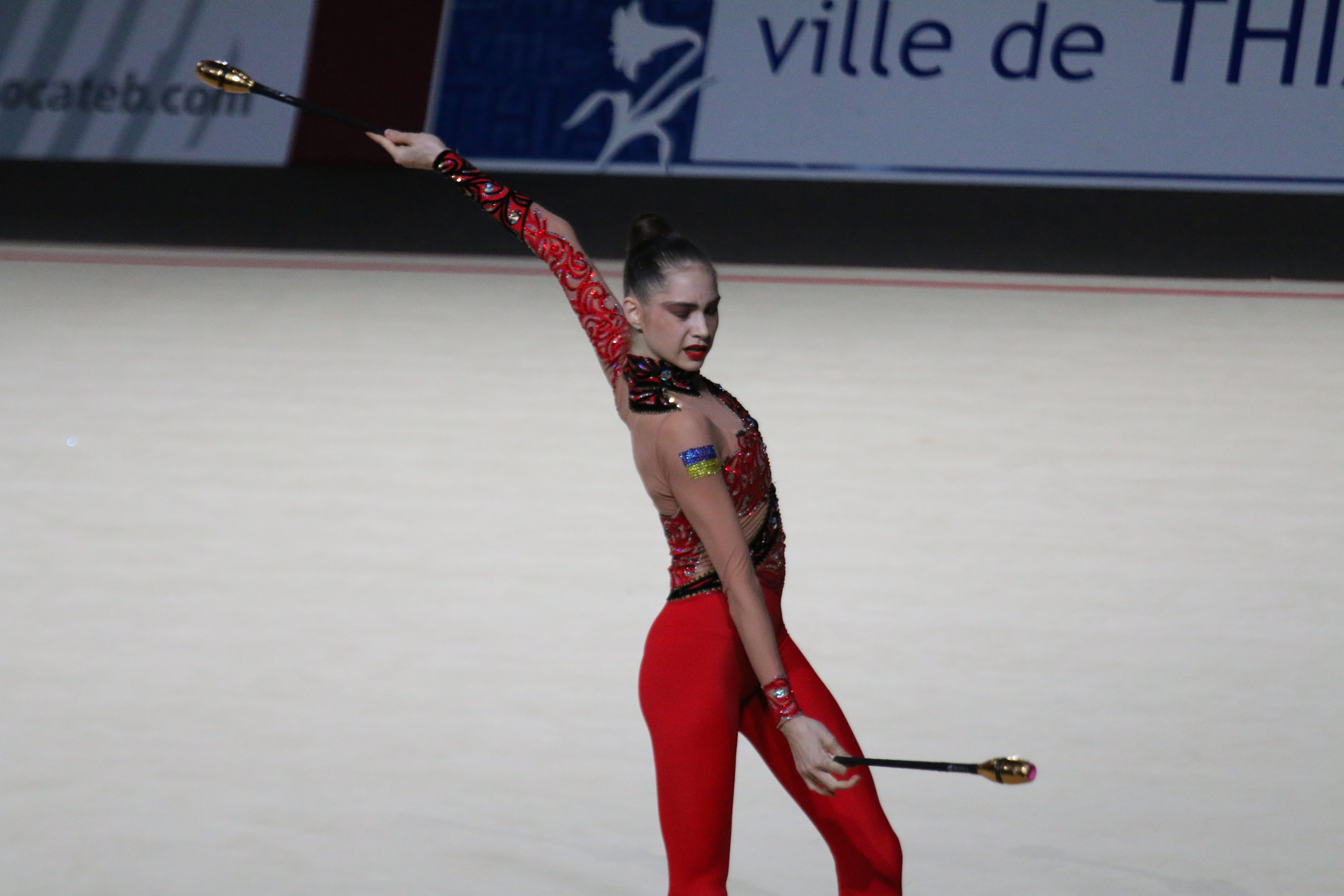

Personal information
- Full name: Vlada Ihorivna Nikolchenko
- Nicknames: Dusya, Vladusya
- Born: 9 December 2002 (age 23) Kharkiv, Kharkiv Oblast, Ukraine
- Height: 177 cm (5 ft 10 in)

Gymnastics career
- Discipline: Rhythmic gymnastics
- Country represented: Ukraine
- Head coach: Iryna Deriugina
- Former coach: Natalia Alexandrovna Kuznets
- Retired: yes
Medal record
Representing Ukraine
Rhythmic gymnastics
World Championships
Bronze medal – third place	2019 Baku	Clubs
European Championships
Bronze medal – third place	2019 Baku	Clubs
European Games
Bronze medal – third place	2019 Minsk	Hoop
Bronze medal – third place	2019 Minsk	Clubs
Grand Prix Final
Gold medal – first place	2018 Marbella	All-around
Gold medal – first place	2018 Marbella	Clubs
Gold medal – first place	2018 Marbella	Ribbon
Gold medal – first place	2020 Kiev	Clubs
Silver medal – second place	2018 Marbella	Ball

Vlada Ihorivna Nikolchenko (Ukrainian: Влада Ігорівна Нікольченко; born 9 December 2002) is a Ukrainian individual rhythmic gymnast. She is the 2019 Worlds clubs bronze medalist, the double (2018–19) World Cup Series winner with clubs and the Grand Prix Final 2018 Winner. She has won multiple medals at European Championships and European Games.

== Career ==
=== Junior ===
Before beginning rhythmic gymnastics, Nikolchenko participated in Aesthetic Group Gymnastics. She was part of the junior Ukrainian group at the 2017 European Championships, where they finished 8th in the 10 clubs final. Nikolchenko also participated as an individual at the International Tournament in Eilat, Israel and won it.

=== Senior ===
==== 2018 ====
Nikolchenko commenced her 2018 senior season at the LA Lights International Tournament in Los Angeles. She also competed at the Miss Valentine Tournament in Tartu, Estonia, where she won the all-around, hoop, ball and clubs finals and finished 4th in ribbon.

Nikolchenko participated at the Baltic Hoop Tournament and won the all-around and clubs final, as well as a bronze in hoop. She finished 7th in the ribbon and 8th in the ball final.

Her Grand Prix debut took place in Kyiv, where she finished 10th in the AA final, 5th in the clubs final and 8th in ribbon and ball. At the 2018 Grand Prix Thiais, she placed 9th in the all-around, won a gold in hoop ahead of Russians Arina Averina and Ekaterina Selezneva and placed 7th in clubs.

Nikolchenko’s first World Cup event was the 2018 Sofia World Cup, where she finished 7th in the AA and qualified to the ribbon and clubs final. In Sofia, she won her first World Cup medal, a silver in clubs, and finished 8th in ribbon. At the 2018 Pesaro World Cup, Nikolchenko placed 13th in the all-around final, won the silver medal for clubs and placed 8th in the ball final. At the 2018 Tashkent World Cup, she placed 10th in AA, 5th in ribbon and 8th in clubs. Nikolchenko’s final 2018 World Cup event was the Baku World Cup, where she won silver in the all-around, gold with clubs and bronze with ribbon. She also placed 5th in hoop and 6th in ball. Nikolchenko was the 2018 World Cup Series winner for clubs.

Nikolchenko made her World Cup Challenge debut at the 2018 Guadalajara World Challenge Cup, where she finished 5th in the all-around, 4th in hoop and 4th in ribbon. She also took part in the Holon Grand Prix, where she also placed 5th in all-around and won the silver medal for hoop and clubs. At the 2018 European Championships, Nikolchenko finished 11th. At the 2018 Minsk World Challenge Cup, she placed 5th in the all-around and qualified to three finals. She won bronze with hoop, finished 4th in ribbon and 6th in ball. At the 2018 Rhythmic Gymnastics World Championships, she placed 5th in the clubs final, 7th in ribbon, 8th in hoop and 4th in the all-around. Her team finished 5th for the team competition. Nikolchenko finished her 2018 season at the Grand Prix Final in Marbella, where she won the all-around gold. She also won gold in clubs, gold in ribbon and silver in ball.

==== 2019 ====
Her 2019 season commenced at the LA Lights Tournament, where she finished 2nd in all-around behind Alina Harnasko.

At the Grand Prix in Marbella, Nikolchenko finished 4th in the all-around, 3rd in hoop, 6th in ribbon, 7th in clubs and 8th in ball. At the Grand Prix Kyiv, she won the all-around gold, hoop gold, ball silver and ribbon bronze. Nikolchenko took part at the Thiais Grand Prix, placing 7th in all-around, 5th in clubs and 8th in ball. She also won the bronze in hoop. Her first World Cup event of the season was the 2019 Sofia World Cup, where she placed 5th in all-around, 6th in clubs and 8th in ribbon.

Nikolchenko participated at the 2019 Tashkent World Cup, finishing 6th in the all-around after several mistakes in her ball routine. She won bronze for hoop and clubs, and took 6th place in ribbon. The following week, she took part in the Baku World Cup and took the all-around bronze behind Russian twins Arina Averina and Dina Averina. She won bronze for clubs and placed 4th in ribbon, 5th in hoop and 7th in ball. Like in 2018, Nikolchenko was the World Cup winner for clubs; she was also the World Cup winner for clubs for the second year in a row.

At the Ukrainian National Championships, Nikolchenko won gold in the all-around. At the European Championships in Baku, she qualified for the hoop and clubs final, winning a quota place for the following year’s European Championship in Kyiv. She won bronze in clubs and finished 8th for hoop.

Nikolchenko participated at the Grand Prix Holon, finishing 11th in the all-around. She only qualified to one final for hoop, where she won silver. At the 2019 Cluj Napoca World Challenge Cup, Nikolchenko brought two new routines for ball and ribbon. She finished 4th in the all-around and qualified for the hoop, ball and clubs finals. She won gold in clubs and finished 5th for hoop and ball.

At the 2019 Rhythmic Gymnastics World Championships in Baku, she qualified for the ball, clubs and ribbon final. Nikolchenko won a bronze with clubs, her first world championship medal, and placed 4th for ribbon and ball. She finished 5th at the all-around final, her second year placed in the top five. Nikolchenko succeeded in winning an Olympic quota.

==== 2020-2021 ====
At the 2020 European Championships in Kyiv, Nikolchenko finished eighth in the all-around. She won gold in clubs at the 2020 Grand Prix Final in Kyiv. At the 2021 European Championships in Varna, she finished 13th in the all-around. In July 2021, she announced through her Instagram account that she was taking a break from gymnastics and would not attend the Olympic Games due to health issues after contracting COVID-19.

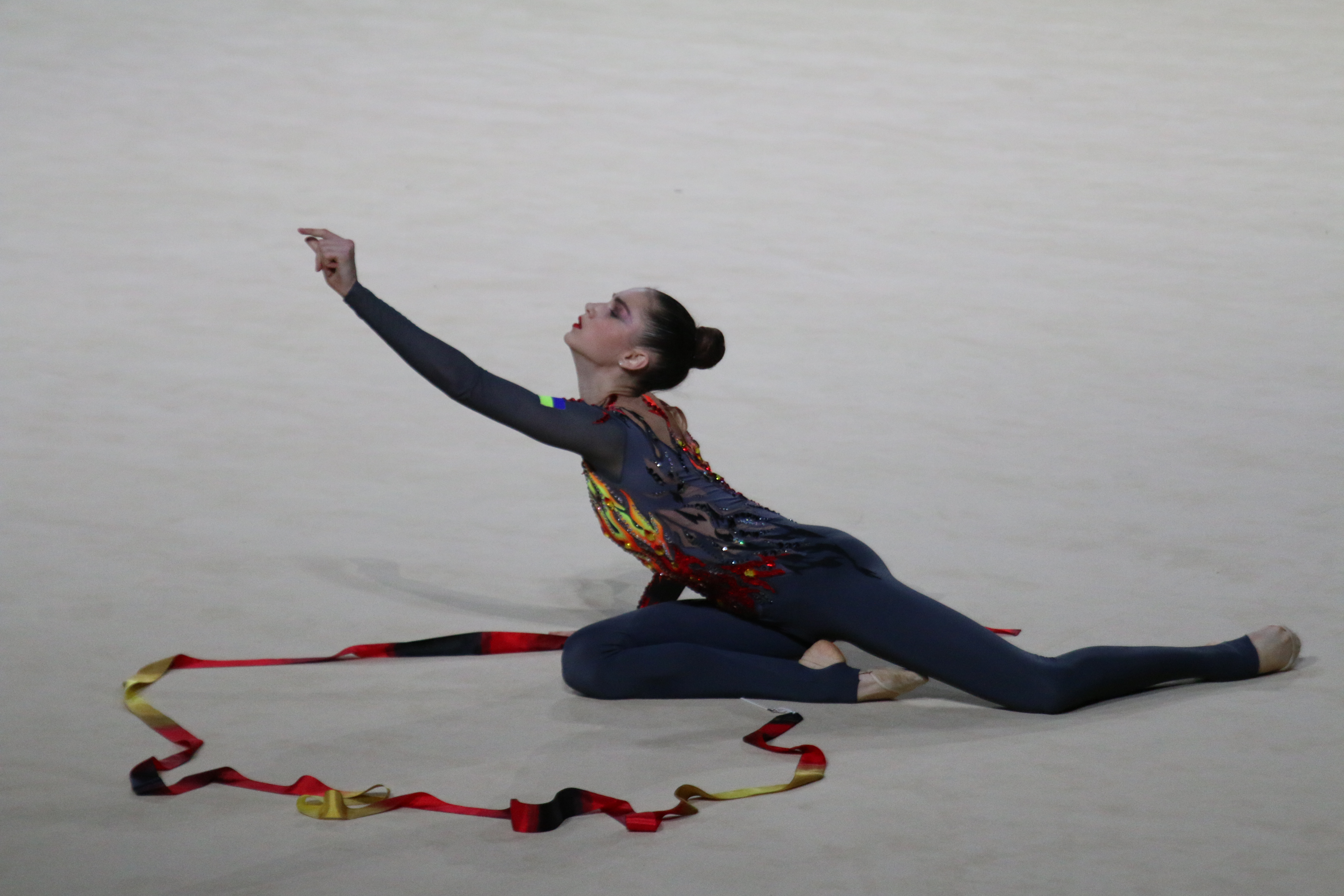
Nikolchenko in Thiais

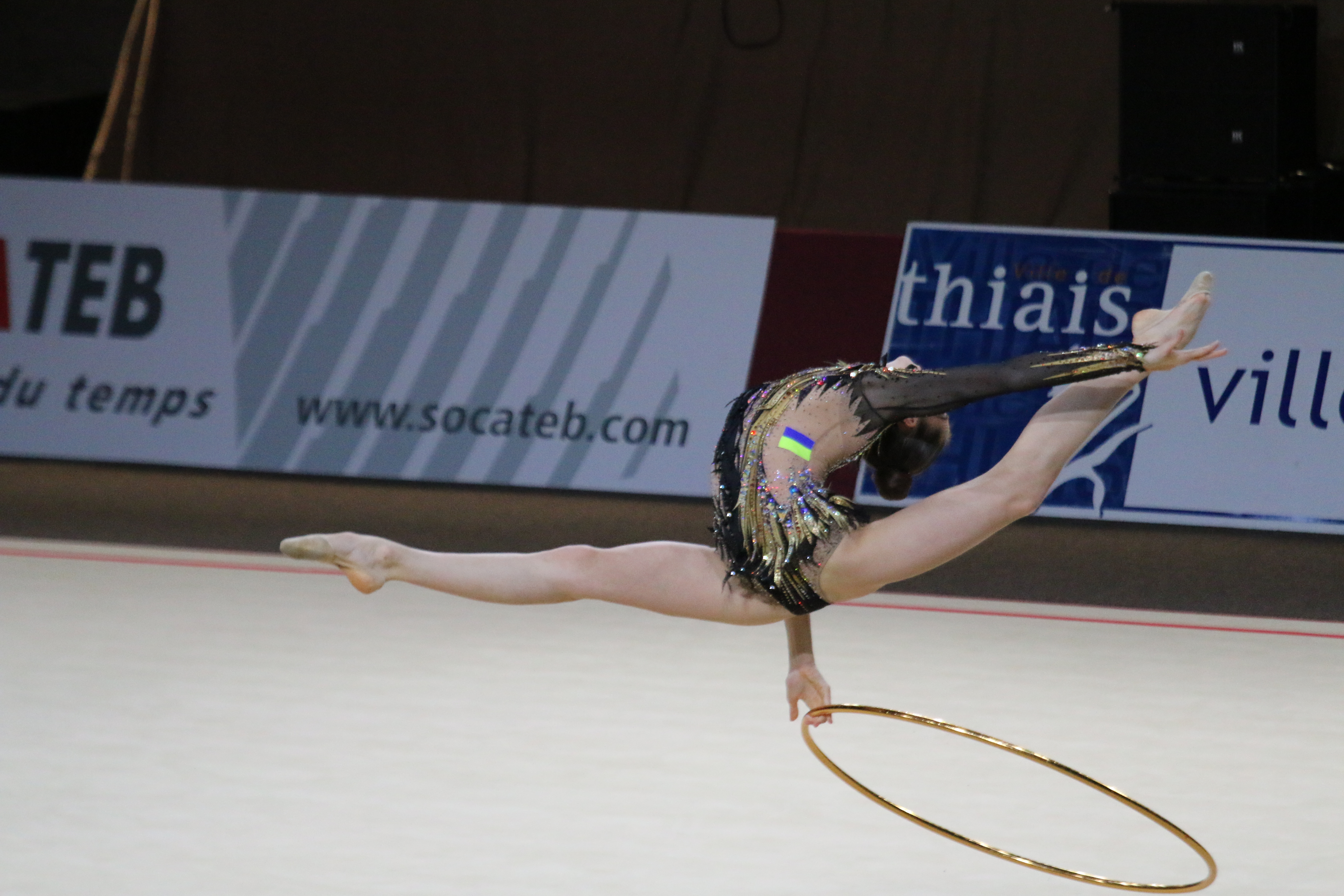
Grand Prix 2019

==== 2023 ====
In July 2023, Nikolchenko announced that she would be coming back to Ukraine after her stay in the United Arab Emirates. On July 4, Nikolchenko went back to competing and won bronze at the Championship of Ukraine.
On November 23, 2023, Nikolchenko was expelled from Ukrainian Gymnastics Federation following racist comment posted about Poles via Instagram.

== Routine music information ==
Year	Apparatus	Music title
2023	Hoop	Make-up by The Hardkiss
2023	Clubs	The Best by Tina Turner
2023	Ribbon	Is Paris Burning? by Takashi Kako
2021	Hoop	O Fortuna by Carl Orff
2021	Ball	Desert from Cirque Du Soleil's "O" by Benoit Jutras
2021	Clubs	Panda by Desiigner
2021	Ribbon	España cañí by Pascual Marquina Narro
2020	Hoop (first)	Swan Lake by Peter I. Tchaikovsky
2020	Hoop (second)	O Fortuna by Carl Orff
2020	Ball	Another One Bites the Dust by Queen
2020	Clubs	Fantasy Overture from Romeo and Juliet by Tchaikovsky
2020	Ribbon (first)	Come Together by the Beatles (cover by Gary Clark Jr. and Junkie XL)
2020	Ribbon (second)	España cañí by Pascual Marquina Narro
2019	Hoop (first)	Survivor by 2WEI from Tomb Raider
2019	Hoop (second)	Fantasy Overture from Romeo and Juliet by Tchaikovsky
2019	Ball (first)	Run This Town by Jay-Z feat. Rihanna and Kanye West
2019	Ball (second)	Another One Bites the Dust by Queen
2019	Clubs	Carmen Suite (Carmen's Entrance and Habanera) by Rodion Shchedrin
2019	Ribbon	Sarajevo by Max Richter
2019	Ribbon (second)	Come Together by the Beatles (cover by Gary Clark Jr. and Junkie XL)
2018	Hoop	Innuendo by Queen
2018	Ball	Private Investigations by Dire Straits
2018	Clubs	Leave no Witnesses by James Horner
2018	Ribbon	Carmina Burana: O Fortuna by Carl Orff
