= Maria Sergeeva (gymnast) =

Russian individual rhythmic gymnast

- Full name: Maria Yurievna Sergeeva
- Alternative name: Mariia Sergeeva
- Nickname: Masha
- Born: February 7, 2001 (age 25) St.Petersburg, Russia
- Height: 172 cm (5 ft 8 in)

Gymnastics career
- Discipline: Rhythmic gymnastics
- Country represented: Russia; (2015-present)
- Club: Gazprom
- Gym: Novogorsk
- Head coach: Irina Viner
- Assistant coach: Amina Zaripova
- Former coach: Irina Pomysova
Medal record
Grand Prix Final
Gold medal – first place	2018 Marbella	Hoop
World Cup
Gold medal – first place	2018 Baku	All-Around
Gold medal – first place	2018 Portimao	All-Around
Junior European Championships
Gold medal – first place	2016 Holon	Hoop
Gold medal – first place	2016 Holon	Team

Maria Yurievna Sergeeva (Russian: Мария Юрьевна Сергеева, born February 7, 2001, in St.Petersburg, Russia) is a Russian individual rhythmic gymnast. She is the 2018 Grand Prix Final All-around bronze medalist. On the junior level, she is the 2016 European Junior Hoop champion. At national level she is the 2016 Russian Junior all-around bronze medalist.

== Personal life ==
Maria has a twin sister, Anastasia Sergeeva, who is also a rhythmic gymnast.

== Career ==
=== Junior ===
Sergeeva and her twin sister were enrolled to a gymnastics club in St.Petersburg by their mother; her first coach was Irina Pomysova, later she would join the official team in St. Petersburg after being noticed by Amina Zaripova, not long after she was invited by Zaripova to train in Russia's national center in Novogorsk.

She competed in the prestigious Russian rhythmic gymnastics competition at the 2014 Hope of Russia, where she won the all-around bronze. Sergeeva made her junior international debut at the 2015 Moscow Junior Grand Prix. Sergeeva won silver in all-around at the 2015 Budapest Junior World Cup and with Team Russia winning the gold (with teammates Alina Ermolova, Daria Pridannikova and Anna Sokolova). She also won team gold (with Daria Pridannikova, Alina Ermolova, Anna Sokolova) at the Junior World Cup in Kazan. She finished 8th in the all-around at the 2015 Russian Junior Championships.

In 2016 Season, Sergeeva won the all-around bronze at the 2016 Russian Junior Championships. She competed at the Brno Junior Grand Prix winning team silver and at the Junior World Cup in Guadalajara, she won silver in team and event finals: gold in rope, clubs and silver in hoop. She was selected to compete at the 2016 European Junior Championships where she won team gold (with Alina Ermolova and Polina Shmatko), she qualified in hoop finals and won the gold medal. On September 9–11, Sergeeva together with seniors Margarita Mamun and Aleksandra Soldatova represented team Gazprom at the annual 2016 Aeon Cup in Tokyo, where they won the team gold and with Sergeeva winning the junior all-around title.

=== Senior ===
In 2017, Sergeeva made her senior debut in the season competing at the Moscow International tournament. She then competed at the MTM Ljubljana Tournament where she finished 4th in the all-around, Sergeeva qualified in the apparatus finals in ball: 4th place and ribbon: silver medal. On May 5–7, Sergeeva competed in her first World Cup event at the 2017 Sofia World Cup placing 12th in the all-around and qualifying in the hoop final finishing in 7th place.

In 2018, Sergeeva started the season with a competition at the 2018 Moscow Senior International tournament finishing 4th in the all-around behind Anastasiia Salos. Sergeeva placed 4th in the all-around behind Ekaterina Selezneva at the 2018 Russian Championships held in Sochi. She made her debut in the Grand Prix at the 2018 Kyiv Grand Prix where she won bronze in all-around. She qualified to all apparatus finals, winning won gold with hoop and clubs, bronze with ball and 4th in ribbon. On April 7–8, she competed at the RG Tournament Irina Cup in Warsaw, Poland where she won gold in the all-around with a total of 71.200 points. On April 27–29, Sergeeva made her World Cup debut at the 2018 Baku World Cup where she won with a total of 69.050 ahead of Ukraine's Vlada Nikolchenko. She qualified in all apparatus finals and won gold in hoop, ribbon, silver in ball and bronze in clubs. On May 11–13, Sergeeva continued building up her success at the 2018 Portimao World Challenge Cup where she won another gold in the all-around (69.300), she qualified in all apparatus finals and won 3 gold medals in hoop(18.750), clubs (17.900), ribbon(17.700) and bronze in ball(17.750).

== Routine music information ==
Year	Apparatus	Music title
2021	Hoop	Story of an Unknown Actor by Alfred Schnittke
2021	Ball	Primavera Portena by Astor Piazolla
2021	Clubs	Faradenza by Little Big
2021	Ribbon	Crazy in Love by Beyoncé
2020	Hoop	Story of an Unknown Actor by Alfred Schnittke
2020	Ball	Symphonic Dances by Sergei Rachmaninoff
2020	Clubs	Faradenza by Little Big
2020	Ribbon	El Anillo by Jennifer Lopez
2019	Hoop	La bohème by Giacomo Puccini
2019	Ball	Symphonic Dances by Sergei Rachmaninoff
2019	Clubs	Uptown Funk by Mark Ronson
2019	Ribbon	Qué Pena by Maluma, J Balvin
2018	Hoop	Romeo and Juliet, TH 42, ČW 39 by Pyotr Tchaikovsky
2018	Ball	The Last Time music from Damage by Zbigniew Preisner
2018	Clubs	Asturias by David Garrett
2018	Ribbon	María de Buenos Aires (Yo soy Maria) music from Ástor Piazzolla and libretto Horacio Ferrer by Sandra Rumolino
2017	Hoop	Romeo and Juliet, TH 42, ČW 39 by Pyotr Tchaikovsky
2017	Ball	The Last Time music from Damage by Zbigniew Preisner
2017	Clubs	A New Life music from The Truman Show by Burkhard Dallwitz
2017	Ribbon	María de Buenos Aires (Yo soy Maria) music from Ástor Piazzolla and libretto Horacio Ferrer by Sandra Rumolino
