= Michelle Segal =

Israeli rhythmic gymnast (born 2003)

- מישל סגל
- Born: 30 August 2003 (age 23) Israel

Gymnastics career
- Discipline: Rhythmic gymnastics
- Country represented: Israel (2017-)
Medal record
Rhythmic Gymnastics
Representing Israel
Event	1st	2nd	3rd
FIG World Cup	0	0	1
Junior European Championships	0	0	1
Total	0	0	2
Junior European Championships
Bronze medal – third place	2017 Budapest	10 Clubs

Michelle Segal (Hebrew: מישל סגל; born 30 August 2003) is an Israeli rhythmic gymnast. She won a European bronze with 10 clubs.

== Rhythmic gymnastics career ==
In 2017 she was part of the junior group that won bronze in the 10 clubs' apparatus final at the European Championships in Budapest, they were also 4th in teams.

At the Europeans in Guadalajara in 2018 she was 74th in the All-Around, 15th with clubs and 12th with ribbon.

In 2022 she made her senior World Cup debut in Athens, she was 3rd in the All-Around, 8th with hoop, 7th with ball, 6th with clubs, 4th with ribbon.

== Routine music information ==
Year	Apparatus	Music title
2023	Hoop	
2023	Ball	
2023	Clubs	
2023	Ribbon	
2022	Hoop	Natural by Imagine Dragons
2022	Ball	Tous les mêmes by Stromae
2022	Clubs	Temptation by Arash
2022	Ribbon	Sunny by Boney M
2018	Hoop	
2018	Ball	
2018	Clubs	Toy by Netta
2018	Ribbon	
2017	10 Clubs	Waka, Gangnam Style, Boom by ?, PSY,?

== See also ==
- List of medalists at the Rhythmic Gymnastics Junior European Championships
