= Ekaterina Selezneva =

Russian rhythmic gymnast (born 1995)

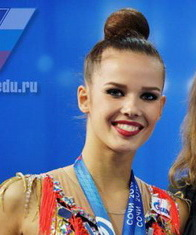
- Selezneva in 2018

Personal information
- Full name: Ekaterina Sergeevna Selezneva
- Nickname: Katya
- Born: 18 May 1995 (age 31) Pushkino, Pushkinsky District, Moscow Oblast
- Height: 170 cm (5 ft 7 in)

Gymnastics career
- Discipline: Rhythmic gymnastics
- Country represented: Russia; (2013-2023)
- Gym: Novogorsk
- Head coach: Irina Viner
- Assistant coach: Olga Nazarova
- World ranking: 25 WC (2019); 4 WC 30 WCC (2018); 4 WCC (2017)
Medal record
Representing Russia
Rhythmic Gymnastics
World Championships
Gold medal – first place	2019 Baku	Hoop
Gold medal – first place	2019 Baku	Team
Bronze medal – third place	2019 Baku	Ribbon
Grand Prix Final
Gold medal – first place	2018 Marbella	Ball
Silver medal – second place	2018 Marbella	Hoop
Silver medal – second place	2018 Marbella	Ribbon
Silver medal – second place	2021 Marbella	Hoop
Bronze medal – third place	2018 Marbella	All-around
Summer Universiade
Gold medal – first place	2017 Taipei	Ball
Gold medal – first place	2019 Naples	All-around
Gold medal – first place	2019 Naples	Hoop
Gold medal – first place	2019 Naples	Ball
Gold medal – first place	2019 Naples	Ribbon
Silver medal – second place	2017 Taipei	All-around
Silver medal – second place	2017 Taipei	Hoop
Silver medal – second place	2017 Taipei	Ribbon
Bronze medal – third place	2017 Taipei	Clubs
Bronze medal – third place	2019 Naples	Clubs

Ekaterina Sergeyevna Selezneva (Russian: Екатери́на Серге́евна Селезнёва, Yekaterina Sergeyevna Seleznyova, born 18 May 1995 in Pushkino, Pushkinsky District, Moscow Oblast) is a Russian individual rhythmic gymnast. She is the hoop world champion in the Rhythmic Gymnastics World Championships 2019. She is also the 2018 Grand Prix Final All-around champion and the 2019 Summer Universiade All-Around gold medalist. On the national level, she is the 2018 Russian National all around bronze medalist.

== Personal life ==
Selezneva married Russian TV Host Organizer and Sports journalist Sergey Gladun on 18 August 2021.

== Career ==
Ekaterina Selezneva was born in the city of Pushkino, in Moscow region, Russia. She is trained by her mother, Olga Nikolaevna Nazarova. She is a Master of Sports of International Class in Russia. A veteran in Russian rhythmic years, Selezneva has competed as a senior since 2011 and was member of the Russian individuals reserve.

=== 2013 season ===
In 2013, Selezneva got her breakthrough in Russia, she won the bronze medal in hoop apparatus in Russian Cup and in Russian Championships and was invited to be the member of the Russian National Team in January 2013. She graduated from No8 Pushkino secondary school with a gold medal the same year.

=== 2014 season ===
In 2014, at the 2014 Russian Championships, Selezneva won gold in Clubs ahead of Arina Averina who took the silver medal respectively. The same year, she competed in the Italian Serie A club championship.

=== 2015 season ===
In 2015, Selezneva had her highest placement finishing 4th in all-around at the 2015 Russian Championships, she won gold in the ribbon apparatus final. She then won the all around gold at the Holon International tournament. She again competed in the Italian Serie A club championship culminating the end of the season.

=== 2016 season ===
In February 2016, she won the all around gold at the Alina Cup in Moscow with overall score of 71.516 points. She finished 6th in the all-around at the 2016 Russian Championships. She took sixth place overall in Baltic Hoop International Rhythmic Gymnastics Tournament in Riga, Latvia.

=== 2017 season ===
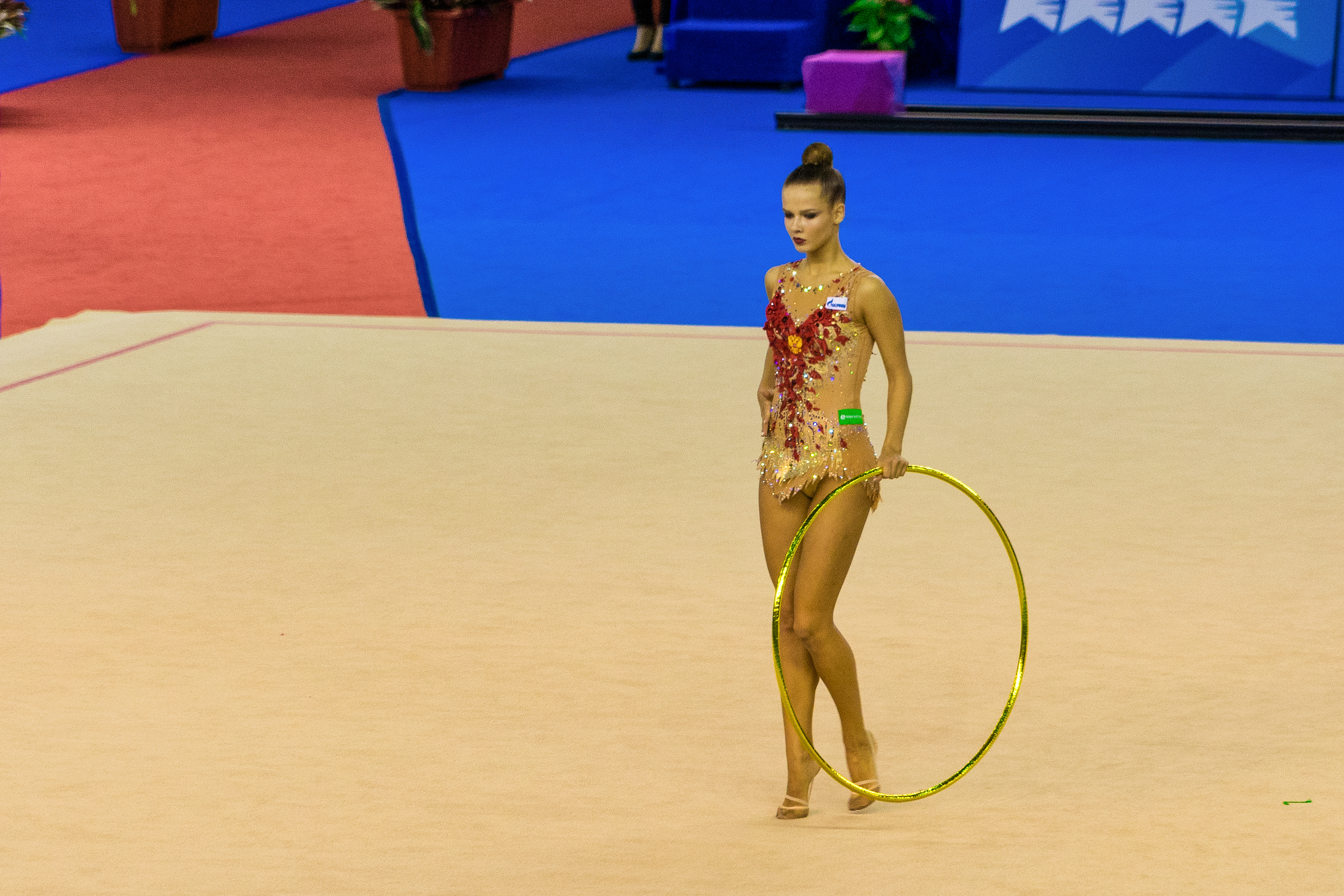
Selezneva at the 2017 Summer Universiade

In February 2017, Selezneva won the all around gold at Alina Cup in Moscow with overall score of 72.350 points. In March 2017, she competed at the 2017 Russian Championships finishing 7th in the all-around. She won the all-around bronze medal at the Corbeil-Essonnes tournament. On 2–4 June Selezneva competed in her first World Cup event at the 2017 Guadalajara World Cup where she won silver medal in the all-around behind teammate Polina Khonina. She qualified to 3 apparatus finals and won gold in hoop, ribbon and silver in ball. On 23–26 June Selezneva won the all-around gold at the Holon Senior International Tournament. On 7–9 July Selezneva competed at the World Challenge Cup at the 2017 World Cup Berlin where she won bronze in the all-around behind Iuliia Bravikova. She qualified to all the apparatus finals taking 2 gold medals in hoop, ball, silver in clubs and bronze in ribbon. On 9 August, during the control training selection process for the 2017 Summer Universiade, Selezneva and Iuliia Bravikova were selected to represent Russia in the rhythmic gymnastics universiade participants. On 27–29 August she won the all-around silver medal at the 2017 Summer Universiade in Taipei, in the apparatus finals: she took gold in ball, silver medals in hoop, ribbon and bronze in clubs.

=== 2018 season ===
In 2018, Selezneva participated for the first time at the 2018 Grand Prix Moscow, finishing eleventh in the all-around competition. At the 2018 Russian National Championships, Selezneva won the bronze medal in the all-around competition behind Dina Averina and Aleksandra Soldatova. She qualified in three apparatuses finals, and won gold with hoop, ball and clubs. At the 2018 Grand Prix Kiev, she won the gold medal in all-around with a total score of 72.350, ahead of Katrin Taseva and Maria Sergeeva. She qualified to all apparatuses finals and won gold with ball and ribbon and silver with hoop and clubs. At the 2018 Grand Prix Thiais, she won the silver medal in all-around, behind Dina Averina. She qualified in 2 apparatus finals winning bronze with hoop and silver with ribbon. Selezneva participated at the 2018 Sofia World Cup, finishing with a silver medal in the all-around competition, behind teammate Aleksandra Soldatova. At the events finals, she won a silver with ball and a bronze with ribbon; she finished 7th with hoop and 5th with clubs. On 20–22 April, at the 2018 Tashkent World Cup, Selezneva won bronze in the all-around, she qualified in all apparatus finals: she won two bronze with ball, ribbon, placed 4th in hoop and 5th in clubs. On 27–29 April Selezneva then competed in a World Challenge Cup event at the 2018 Baku World Cup where she won finished 11th in the all-around after a disastrous clubs and ribbon routine, she qualified in 1 apparatus winning the gold in hoop ahead of teammate Maria Sergeeva. On 16–17 May Selezneva competed at the 2018 Holon Grand Prix and won the all-around bronze medal with a total of 72.050 points, she qualified in 2 apparatus: ball and ribbon, however she took the placement qualification of Soldatova in hoop and clubs after she withdrew from competition in the event finals, Selezneva won silver in ribbon, bronze in clubs and finished 4th in hoop, ball. In 2018 Rhythmic Gymnastics World Championships she was in the reserve team but didn't participate.

=== 2019 season ===
In 2019, Selezneva started her International season with the 2019 Grand Prix Moscow, where she finished in 4th place, behind her teammates, Dina Averina, Arina Averina and Aleksandra Soldatova; she took the silver with ball. She won the gold medal with hoop and team, and bronze with ribbon in Baku in the 37th World Championships.

=== Routine music information ===
Year	Apparatus	Music title
2018	Hoop	"Piano Concerto No. 1 in E-Flat Major, S. 124, R. 458", by Philippe Entremont & The Philadelphia Orchestra
2018	Ball	"London", by Zemfira
2018	Clubs	El Verano, by Novak
2018	Ribbon	"Sex Bomb", by Tom Jones
2019	Hoop	"Meditation", "Rescue Me" from Atonement by Cirque du Soleil, Dario Marianelli
2019	Ball	Chopin, by Elena Vaenga
2019	Clubs (first)	"I'm a Dragon", by Apashe & Sway
2019	Clubs (second)	"Highway to Hell", by AC/DC
2019	Clubs (third)	"Take You Down", by Daniel Pemberton
2019	Ribbon (first)	Do You Only Wanna Dance, Sex and the City-Movie Theme by Julio Daviel Big Band, Pfeifer Broz Orchestra
2019	Ribbon (second)	Tico-Tico no fubá by Zequinha de Abreu
2020	Hoop	"Strange Birds", by Birdy
2020	Ball (second)	No One Ever Called Me That, by Dario Marianelli
2020	Ball (first)	"Elegy in E-Flat Minor", by Vladimir Ashkenazy, composed by Sergey Rachmaninoff
2020	Clubs	"Bad", "Billie Jean", by Michael Jackson
2020	Ribbon	"Bensonhurst Blues", by Oscar Benton
2020	Ribbon (second)	I Will Never Forget You, by Alexey Rybnikov

== Competitive highlights ==
(Team competitions in seniors are held only at the World Championships, Europeans and other Continental Games.)

International: Senior
Year	Event	AA	Team	Hoop	Ball	Clubs	Ribbon
2021	International Online Tournament (Finnish Gymnastics Federation)	10th					
2021	Final Liga de Clubes Iberdrola		1st		1st	1st	
2021	Grand Prix Moscow	6th		6th (Q)	5th (Q)	7th (Q)	7th (Q)
2020	3rd International Online Tournament (Russian Rhythmic Gymnastics Federation)	4th		3rd (Q)	3rd (Q)	8th (Q)	5th (Q)
2020	2nd International Online Tournament (Russian Rhythmic Gymnastics Federation)	DNS		5th (Q)	4th (Q)	DNS	DNS
2020	Russia-Belarus Friendly Match	DNS					
2020	Grand Prix Tartu	3rd		3rd (Q)	2nd	8th (Q)	3rd (Q)
2020	Grand Prix Moscow	4th		1st	5th (Q)	7th (Q)	2nd
2019	World Championships	4th (Q)	1st	1st		5th (Q)	3rd
2019	World Cup Cluj-Napoca	2nd		2nd	1st	7th	4th
2019	Summer Universiade	1st		1st	1st	3rd	1st
2019	Grand Prix Brno	6th		10th (Q)	7th (Q)	7th (Q)	6th (Q)
2019	Grand Prix Holon	8th		5th	11th (Q)	10th (Q)	16th (Q)
2019	World Cup Guadalajara	2nd		3rd	7th	3rd	2nd
2019	World Cup Sofia	9th		2nd	1st	14th (Q)	14th (Q)
2019	Grand Prix Thiais	5th		5th	4th	16th (Q)	4th (Q)
2019	Grand Prix Kyiv	3rd		2nd	1st	12th (Q)	5th
2019	Grand Prix Moscow	4th		5th (Q)	2nd	6th (Q)	7th (Q)
2018	Grand Prix Final: Marbella	3rd		2nd	1st	4th	2nd
2018	Grand Prix Brno	1st		2nd	1st	1st	8th
2018	World Cup Minsk	4th		11th (Q)	1st	7th	5th
2018	Grand Prix Holon	3rd		4th	4th	3rd	2nd
2018	World Cup Baku	11th		12th (Q)	1st	20th (Q)	15 (Q)
2018	World Cup Tashkent	3rd		4th	3rd	5th	3rd
2018	World Cup Sofia	2nd		7th	2nd	5th	3rd
2018	Grand Prix Thiais	2nd		3rd	6th (Q)	2nd	2nd
2018	Grand Prix Kyiv	1st		2nd	1st	2nd	1st
2018	Grand Prix Moscow	11th		10th (Q)	9th (Q)	12th (Q)	13th (Q)
2017	Aeon Cup	7th	4th				
2017	Summer Universiade	2nd		2nd	1st	3rd	2nd
2017	World Cup Berlin Masters	3rd		1st	1st	2nd	3rd
2017	International Tournament of Holon	1st	1st	1st	2nd	1st	2nd
2017	World Cup Guadalajara	2nd		1st	2nd	10th (Q)	1st
2017	International Tournament of Corbeil-Essonnes	3rd		1st	1st	2nd	2nd
2017	Luxembourg Trophy	2nd		2nd	2nd	2nd	1st
2017	International Tournament of Pesaro	2nd		1st		2nd	
2017	Aura Cup	1st				1st	1st
2017	Aphrodite Cup	2nd		3rd	2nd	WD	WD
2017	International Tournament of Moscow	1st					
2016	Aura Cup	1st		1st	1st	1st	1st
2016	Koop Cup	1st		2nd	2nd	4th	1st
2015	International Tournament of Holon	1st					
National
Year	Event	AA	Team	Hoop	Ball	Clubs	Ribbon
2021	Russian Championships	6th	1st	7th		5th	5th
2020	Russian Championships	4th	3rd				
2019	Russian Championships	4th	1st	9th (Q)	2nd	1st	3rd
2018	Russian Championships	3rd		1st	1st	1st	15th (Q)
2017	Russian Championships	7th	3rd	4th	2nd	4th	4th
2016	Russian Championships	6th	3rd	5th	6th	9th	24th (Q)
2015	Russian Championships	4th	3rd	4th	8th	8th	1st
2014	Russian Championships	5th		12th (Q)	4th	1st	4th
2012	Russian Championships	4th					
2011	Russian Championships	17th	2nd				
2010	Russian Championships	42nd (Q)					
2009	Russian Championships	47th	2nd				
Q = Qualifications (Did not advance to Event Final due to the 2 gymnast per country rule, only Top 8 highest score); WR = World Record; WD = Withdrew; NT = No Team Competition; DNS = Did Not Start
