= Rhythmic Gymnastics Grand Prix =

Competition for rhythmic gymnastics

- Sport: Rhythmic gymnastics
- Founded: 1994
- Countries: Worldwide
- Most titles: Russia

The Rhythmic Gymnastics Grand Prix circuit is an annual series of tournaments in rhythmic gymnastics open to gymnasts from around the world. The series consists of several stages held in different countries in Europe and is considered one of the major competition circuits outside those organized by the Fédération Internationale de Gymnastique (FIG) or European Gymnastics. Competitors include many of the world's leading gymnasts.

Each Grand Prix stage is conducted as an all-around qualification competition, followed by four apparatus finals in hoop, ball, clubs, and ribbon. The concluding event of the circuit is commonly referred to as the Grand Prix Final. The focus of each stage is on individual competition, although group events have also been included at some stages since at least 1995.

The Grand Prix circuit should not be confused with the Rhythmic Gymnastics World Cup series, which is officially organized by the FIG. In contrast, the Grand Prix is neither organized nor promoted by the FIG.

== History ==
The Grand Prix circuit was established in 1994. The idea for a series of events held across different cities was developed by then vice-president of the International Gymnastics Federation, Hans-Jürgen Zacharias, together with Robert Baur. The rules were subsequently drafted through a series of meetings with the European Gymnastics Union. The objective of the circuit was to bring together and rank the elite of international rhythmic gymnastics. Prize money was also introduced, marking the first time it was awarded in rhythmic gymnastics competitions.

Nations that have hosted Grand Prix stages include Austria, Belarus, Belgium, Bulgaria, Czech Republic, Estonia, France, Germany, Israel, Netherlands, Slovakia, Slovenia, Spain, Russia, and Ukraine.

== Grand Prix circuit ==
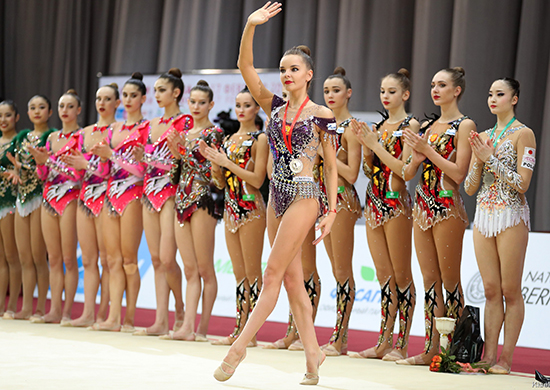
Gymnasts at the 2019 Moscow Grand Prix

Each year, a number of stages, ranging from a minimum of three to a maximum of twelve, are held across different countries in Europe. Individual gymnasts compete in an all-around competition, which also serves as qualification for the apparatus finals. In the early editions of the Grand Prix, a separate all-around final was also held. The concluding event of the circuit is commonly referred to as the Grand Prix Final. Until 2005, gymnasts accumulated points at each stage, and only the highest ranked athletes qualified to compete in the Grand Prix Final.

Grand Prix events are invitational competitions. Although they are not officially organized by the FIG, all participating gymnasts must hold valid FIG licenses and meet the age requirements for senior level competition. The current FIG Code of Points is used for judging, with performances evaluated according to the most recent rules and scoring system established by the Fédération Internationale de Gymnastique.

=== Events ===
Year	Number of stages	Grand Prix Final	Location
1994	4	Vienna Grand Prix	(Austria) Vienna
1995	4	Alfred Vogel Grand Prix	(Netherlands) Deventer
1996	5	Vienna Grand Prix	(Austria) Vienna
1997	6	Alfred Vogel Grand Prix	(Netherlands) Deventer
1998	6	Grand Prix Linz	(Austria) Linz
1999	7	Grand Prix Korneuburg	(Austria) Korneuburg
2000	5	Alfred Vogel Grand Prix	(Netherlands) Deventer
2001	6	Alfred Vogel Grand Prix	(Netherlands) Deventer
2002	8	Grand Prix Innsbruck	(Austria) Innsbruck
2003	9	Grand Prix Innsbruck	(Austria) Innsbruck
2004	7	Alfred Vogel Grand Prix	(Netherlands) Deventer
2005	8	Berlin Masters	(Germany) Berlin
2006	9	Berlin Masters	(Germany) Berlin
2007	10	Grand Prix Innsbruck	(Austria) Innsbruck
2008	8	Grand Prix Slovakia	(Slovakia) Bratislava
2009	8	Berlin Masters	(Germany) Berlin
2010	8	Berlin Masters	(Germany) Berlin
2011	5	Brno Grand Prix	(Czech Republic) Brno
2012	5	Brno Grand Prix	(Czech Republic) Brno
2013	5	Berlin Masters	(Germany) Berlin
2014	6	Grand Prix Innsbruck	(Austria) Innsbruck
2015	5	Brno Grand Prix	(Czech Republic) Brno
2016	5	Grand Prix Eilat	(Israel) Eilat
2017	7	Grand Prix Eilat	(Israel) Eilat
2018	6	Grand Prix Marbella	(Spain) Marbella
2019	6	Brno Grand Prix	(Czech Republic) Brno
2020	4	Deriugina Grand Prix	(Ukraine) Kyiv
2021	3	Grand Prix Marbella	(Spain) Marbella
2022	4	Grand Prix Brno Tart Cup	(Czech Republic) Brno
2023	4	Grand Prix Brno Tart Cup	(Czech Republic) Brno
2024	4	Grand Prix Brno Tart Cup	(Czech Republic) Brno
2025	4	Grand Prix Brno Tart Cup	(Czech Republic) Brno
2026	4	Grand Prix Brno Tart Cup	(Czech Republic) Brno

== All-time medal table ==
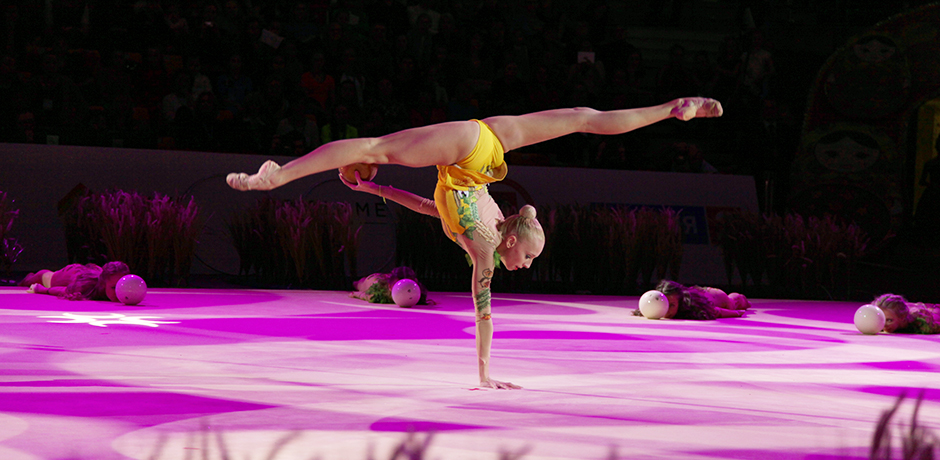
Yana Kudryavtseva at the 2015 Moscow Grand Prix

The following table summarizes the total number of individual medals won by gymnasts from each nation in all stages of the Rhythmic Gymnastics Grand Prix circuit from 1994 to 2026. Only senior-level medalists from official Grand Prix stages and the Grand Prix Final are included. Medals from group events, whether awarded as part of Grand Prix competitions or at international tournaments held alongside Grand Prix stages, are not counted.

This compilation highlights the most successful nations in individual rhythmic gymnastics within the Grand Prix circuit. Medal totals are organized by country and are initially presorted by the number of gold medals, followed by silver and bronze. The table reflects achievements in both apparatus finals and all-around competitions.

Senior individual events (1994–2026 after Thiais Grand Prix)
Rank	Nation	Gold	Silver	Bronze	Total
1	Russia (RUS)	623	423	218	1,264
2	Ukraine (UKR)	185	172	189	546
3	Belarus (BLR)	54	141	188	383
4	Bulgaria (BUL)	29	66	75	170
5	Israel (ISR)	13	35	73	121
6	Italy (ITA)	9	12	13	34
7	Slovenia (SLO)	7	3	6	16
8	Individual Neutral Athletes (AIN)	4	3	4	11
9	Kazakhstan (KAZ)	3	19	32	54
10	Uzbekistan (UZB)	3	9	7	19
11	Germany (GER)	3	4	8	15
12	Georgia (GEO)	3	3	6	12
13	Azerbaijan (AZE)	2	14	41	57
14	France (FRA)	2	6	15	23
15	Spain (ESP)	2	1	4	7
16	United States (USA)	1	3	8	12
17	Poland (POL)	1	2	6	9
18	Hungary (HUN)	1	2	3	6
19	Greece (GRE)	1	1	2	4
20	Brazil (BRA)	1	1	1	3
21	South Korea (KOR)	0	2	7	9
22	Estonia (EST)	0	2	1	3
23	Canada (CAN)	0	1	7	8
24	Czech Republic (CZE)	0	1	2	3
25	Austria (AUT)	0	0	4	4
26	Latvia (LAT)	0	0	3	3
27	Japan (JPN)	0	0	1	1
Totals (27 entries)		947	926	924	2,797

== Group events ==
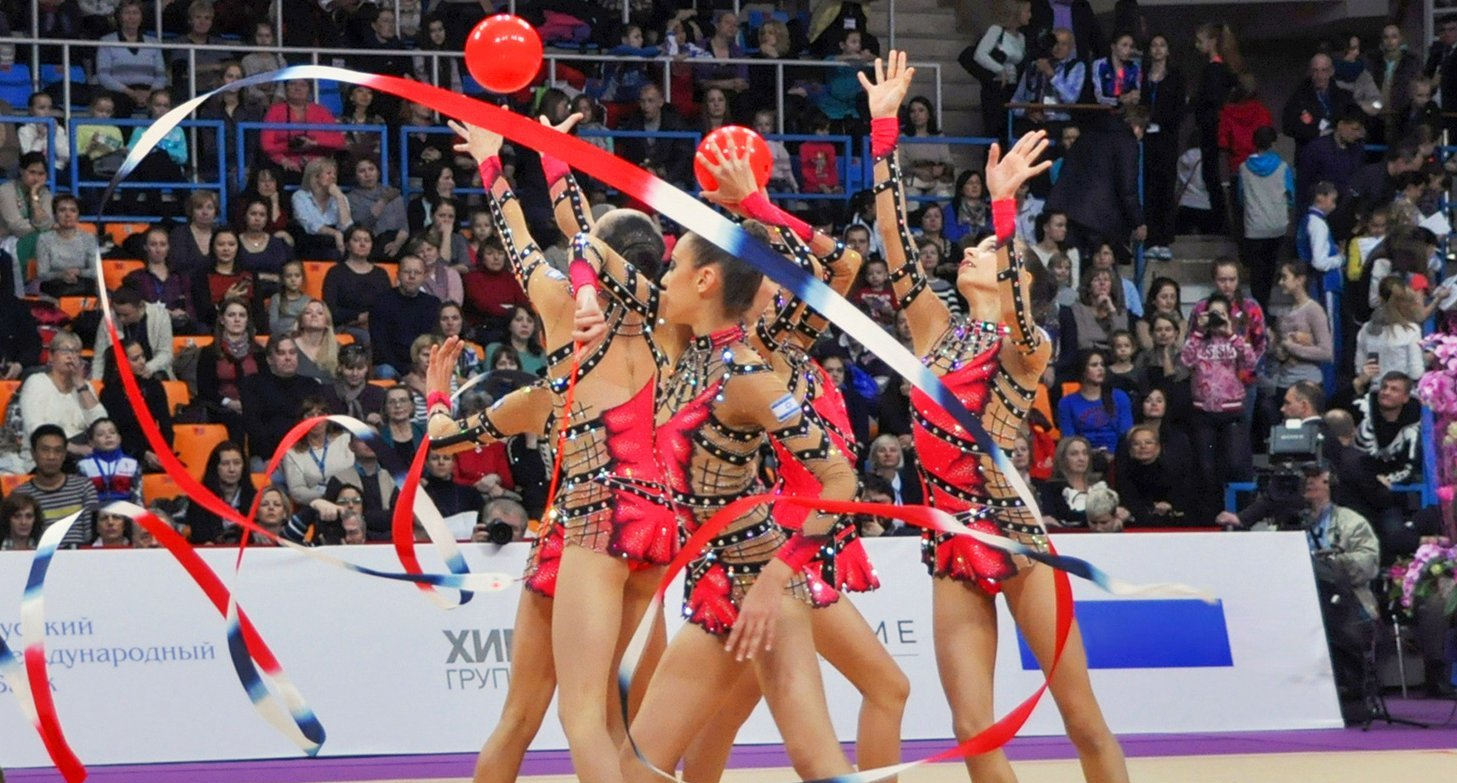
Israeli group at the 2014 Moscow Grand Prix

Organizers of Grand Prix events may also hold additional competitions for groups at the same venue. In the early editions, group competitions were staged as parallel events, usually in the form of international tournaments, and were conducted alongside individual performances during Grand Prix competitions. In 2003, an official Grand Prix event specifically for groups was held in Sofia, Bulgaria. Since 2016, organizers have also been permitted to stage official group competitions as part of Grand Prix events, although they are not required to do so. Nations that have earned at least one senior level group medal, either in international tournaments or official Grand Prix stages, since 1995 include:

- Azerbaijan
- Belarus
- Brazil
- Bulgaria
- Canada
- China
- Czech Republic
- Egypt
- Estonia
- Finland
- France
- Georgia
- Germany
- Greece
- Hungary
- Israel
- Italy
- Japan
- Latvia
- Lithuania
- Mexico
- Moldova
- Netherlands
- Norway
- Poland
- Portugal
- Russia
- Spain
- Sweden
- Switzerland
- Turkey
- Ukraine
- United States
- Uzbekistan

== See also ==
- List of medalists at the Rhythmic Gymnastics Grand Prix circuit (1994–2003)
- List of medalists at the Rhythmic Gymnastics Grand Prix circuit (2004–2013)
- List of medalists at the Rhythmic Gymnastics Grand Prix circuit (2014–2023)
- List of medalists at the Rhythmic Gymnastics Grand Prix circuit (2024–2033)
- Rhythmic Gymnastics World Cup
