= Victoria Veinberg Filanovsky =

Israeli rhythmic gymnast

Victoria Filanovsky
- ויקטוריה פילנובסקי
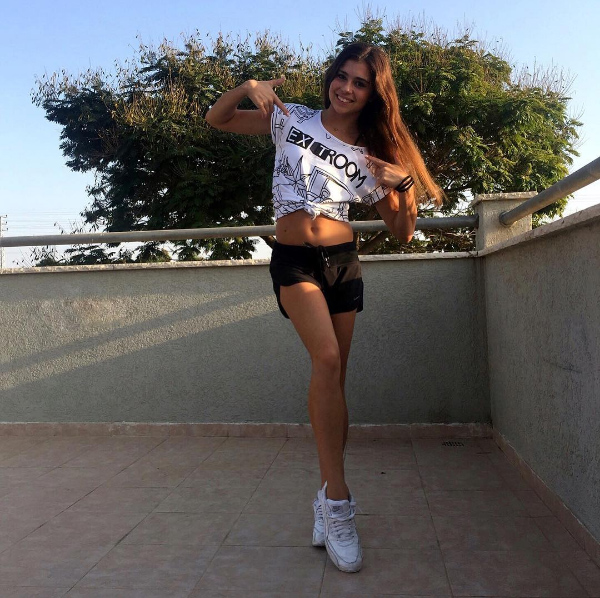

Personal information
- Full name: Victoria Filanovsky Veinberg
- Nickname: Tori
- Born: 23 February 1995 (age 31) Saint Petersburg, Russia
- Height: 162 cm (5 ft 4 in)

Gymnastics career
- Discipline: Rhythmic gymnastics
- Country represented: Israel; (2008 - 2017)
- Head coach: Natalia Asmolov
- Choreographer: Natalia Karalova
- Retired: yes
- World ranking: 9 WC 8 WCC (2017 Season); 17 (2016 Season); 9 (2015 Season); 12 (2014 Season); 16 (2013 Season); 29 (2012 Season)
Medal record
Representing Israel
Rhythmic Gymnastics
Grand Prix Final
Silver medal – second place	2016 Eilat	Clubs
Silver medal – second place	2014 Innsbruck	Ball
Bronze medal – third place	2016 Eilat	Hoop
Bronze medal – third place	2016 Eilat	Ball
Bronze medal – third place	2016 Eilat	Ribbon
Bronze medal – third place	2014 Innsbruck	Clubs
Bronze medal – third place	2014 Innsbruck	Ribbon

Victoria Filanovsky (Hebrew: ויקטוריה פילנובסקי ויינברג; born 23 February 1995 in Saint Petersburg, Russia) is a retired Israeli individual rhythmic gymnast.

== Personal life ==
Filanovsky speaks Hebrew, Russian and English. She is also a FIG brevet judge.

== Career ==
=== Junior ===
Veinberg Filanovsky became a member of the Israeli Gymnastics National Team in 2008. She competed at the 2010 European Junior Championships in Bremen where she qualified to two event finals, finishing 6th in rope and 5th in clubs, as well as qualifying in the 2010 Youth Olympic Games where she finished 6th in the all-around.

=== Senior ===
Veinberg Filanovsky's first senior international competition was in the 2011 season, competing in her first Worlds at the 2011 World Championships in Montpellier, France and placing 39th in qualifications. In 2012, she became the Israeli National Champion ahead of Neta Rivkin. She qualified for her first event final in the World Cup Series in Penza, Russia finishing 8th in ball. She competed at the 2012 London Olympics Test Event and placed 15th; she did not qualify for the 2012 Olympics.

In 2013, she competed in the World Cup and Grand Prix Series. At the 2013 Holon Grand Prix, Veinberg Filanovsky won her first Grand Prix medal, winning the bronze in all-around ahead of Russian Alexandra Merkulova. She competed at the 2013 European Championships with the Israeli team, finishing 5th in the team event. In the 2013 World Championships, she finished 21st in the all-around final behind Salome Phajava. She then competed at the 2013 World Games, finishing 8th in ball, 6th in hoop and 7th in the clubs final.

In 2014, Veinberg Filanovsky finished 7th in all-around at the 2014 Corbeil-Essonnes World Cup, and qualified to all four event finals for the first time in her World Cup competitions. On 30 May – 1 June she competed at the 2014 Minsk World Cup. On 10–15 June she competed at the 2014 European Championships and finished 12th in the all-around final. On 5–7 September, at the 2014 World World Cup Final in Kazan, Russia, Veinberg Filanovsky finished 9th in all-around behind Neta Rivkin, and qualified to one event final, finishing 7th in clubs. On 22–28 September Veinberg Filanovsky (along with teammates Neta Rivkin and Martina Poplinsky) represented Israel at the 2014 World Championships where Team Israel finished in 4th place. She finished 12th in the all-around finals behind Kseniya Moustafaeva of France. On 18–20 October Veinberg Filanovsky competed at the 2014 Grand Prix Berlin and won the all-around silver behind Russia's Maria Titova, while in event finals she won silver medals in hoop, clubs and ribbon. On 1–3 November Veinberg Filanovsky won the all-around bronze at the 2014 Grand Prix Brno behind compatriot Neta Rivkin. On 14–16 November, at the 2014 Grand Prix Final in Innsbruck, Austria, Veinberg Filanovsky finished 4th in the all-around behind Bulgaria's Neviana Vladinova. In event finals, she won silver in ball and two bronze (clubs, ribbon).

In 2015, Veinberg Filanovsky withdrew from her first event of the season at the Moscow Grand Prix because of injury. On 21–22 March she returned to competition at the 2015 Thiais Grand Prix, finishing 5th in the all-around and qualified to four event finals. On 27–29 March she competed at the 2015 Lisboa World Cup finishing 9th in the all-around and qualified to two event finals. She then competed at the 2015 Bucharest World Cup and finished 7th in the all-around. On 10–12 April she finished 10th in the all-around at the 2015 Pesaro World Cup. Veinberg Filanovsky and teammate Neta Rivkin competed at the 2015 European Championships where Team Israel finished 4th; she qualified to two event finals, finishing 5th in hoop and 8th in ball. Veinberg Filanovsky competed at the 2015 Holon Grand Prix finishing 7th in all-around, she qualified to 3 event finals. On 22–24 May Veinberg Filanovsky competed at the 2015 Tashkent World Cup finishing 4th in the all-around with a total of 70.450 points behind Korean Son Yeon-Jae; she qualified to all four apparatus finals. At the 2015 Grand Prix Berlin, Veinberg Filanovsky finished 5th in all-around (71.150) behind teammate Neta Rivkin; she again qualified to four apparatus finals. On 15–21 June Veinberg Filanovsky competed at the inaugural 2015 European Games where she finished 10th in the all-around. In August, Veinberg Filanovsky won the all-around gold at the 2015 Baltic Cup beating Azeri gymnast Marina Durunda. At the 2015 Budapest World Cup, Veinberg Filanovsky finished 8th in the all-around behind Durunda. She qualified to three apparatus finals, finishing 7th (clubs, ball) and 8th (ribbon). At the 2015 Sofia World Cup, Veinberg Filanovsky finished 13th in the all-around and qualified to the ribbon finals. At the 2015 World Cup Final in Kazan, Veinberg Filanovsky finished 16th in the all-around and qualified to the apparatus final in ribbon. On 9–13 September Veinberg Filanovsky (together with teammates Neta Rivkin and Linoy Ashram) competed at the 2015 World Championships in Stuttgart, with Team Israel finishing 4th. Veinberg Filanovsky qualified to the all-around finals, finishing in 21st place.

In 2016, Veinberg-Filanovsky competed at the 2016 Espoo World Cup finishing 13th in the all-around and qualified to the hoop final. On 17–20 March she competed at the 2016 Lisboa World Cup where she finished 12th in the all-around and qualified to three apparatus finals. At the 2016 Baltic Hoop, she won the all-around silver behind Russian Karina Kuznetsova. On 1–3 April she competed at the 2016 Pesaro World Cup where she finished 14th in the all-around. On 6–8 May Veinberg-Filanovsky competed at the Brno Grand Prix finishing 4th in the all-around with a total of 72.100 points; she qualified to all four apparatus finals and won a bronze in ball and ribbon. On 13–15 May Veinberg-Filanovsky finished 6th in the all-around at the 2016 Grand Prix Bucharest. She finished 6th in the all-around at the 2016 Minsk World Cup and qualified to three apparatus finals. On 17–19 June Veinberg-Filanovsky competed at the 2016 European Championships where she finished in 6th place, scoring a new personal best of 73.082 points. On 1–3 July she competed at the 2016 Berlin World Cup finishing 6th in the all-around with a total of 71.700 points; she qualified to all four apparatus finals. She withdrew from competition at the 2016 Kazan World Cup because of injury. On 23–24 September Veinberg-Filanovsky culminated her season with the 2016 Grand Prix Final in Eilat, where she finished 5th in the all-around with a total of 72.383 points behind teammate Linoy Ashram. She qualified to all the apparatus finals, winning a silver in clubs and bronze in hoop, ball and ribbon.

In the 2017 season, Veinberg-Filanovsky competed at the 2017 Grand Prix Moscow, finishing 10th in the all-around and qualified to the clubs and ribbon finals. She then competed at the 2017 Baltic Hoop, winning the all-around gold medal. On 17–19 March Veinberg-Filanovsky won the all-around bronze medal at the Grand Prix Kiev behind Yulia Bravikova. On 31 March – 2 April Filanovsky competed at the 2017 Grand Prix Marbella finishing 7th in the all-around and qualified to all the apparatus finals. On 7–9 April Veinberg-Filanovsky competed at the 2017 Pesaro World Cup, finishing 7th in the all-around and qualified to the final in ball. She then competed at the 2017 Tashkent World Cup, finishing 9th in the all-around and qualified to the hoop and ribbon finals. Her next competition was the 2017 Baku World Cup where she finished 5th in the all-around behind Alina Harnasko; she qualified to the apparatus finals and won her first gold medal in the World Cup – a gold in clubs. On 12–14 May Veinberg-Filanovsky competed at the 2017 World Challenge Cup in Portimao where she won her first all-around medal, a bronze behind Russia's Elizaveta Lugovskikh. Here she qualified to four event finals where she won a career best of three gold medals in hoop, ball and ribbon and finished 4th in clubs. On 19–21 May Filanovsky and teammate Linoy Ashram represented Israel at the 2017 European Championships in Budapest, Hungary. Her next event was at the 2017 World Challenge Cup Guadalajara where she finished 9th in the all-around, and qualified to two apparatus finals. Veinberg-Filanovsky's last competition was at the Holon Grand Prix where she finished 4th in the all-around. She announced her retirement a few days after that event.

== Routine music information ==
Year	Apparatus	Music title
2017	Hoop (2nd)	Granada by Caterina Valente
2017	Hoop (1st)	Carmen's Story by Edith Piaf
2017	Ball	Historia de un Amor (acoustic version)
2017	Clubs	Concerto for Sitar & Orchestra, Sholay Theme by Ravi Shankar, Terence Emery, DJ Vivek
2017	Ribbon	Lisa (Theme From) by Ferrante & Teicher
2016	Hoop	Theme From Goodbye Again by Ferrante & Teicher
2016	Ball	Guarda Che Luna by Petra Magoni, Ferruccio Spinetti
2016	Clubs	?
2016	Ribbon	Rumania, Oifn Pripitchik, Bai Mir Bistu Sheyn, Bublictchki by London Festival Orchestra & Chorus
2015	Hoop	Historia De Un Amor by Perez Prado
2015	Ball	Allegro by Rene Aubry
2015	Clubs	Golden Wedding by The Pasadena Roof Orchestra
2015	Ribbon	Malaguena by Connie Francis
2014	Hoop	The storm by Havasi
2014	Ball	Caravan
2014	Clubs	The Lord Is Back by Bernat Font Trio
2014	Ribbon	Malaguena by Connie Francis
2013	Hoop	Fast Boat music from Totem by Filippo Crotti
2013	Ball	Io Ci Saro by Andrea Bocelli & Lang Lang
2013	Clubs	?
2013	Ribbon	?
2012	Hoop	Sultana by Corner Stone Cues
2012	Ball	?
2012	Clubs	Mondo A Go Go! by Eat Static
2012	Ribbon	Shel me versty by Loyko
