= Julia Evchik =

Belarusian rhythmic gymnast (born 2001)

- Alternative name: Yulia Evchik
- Born: 2 January 2001 (age 25) Minsk, Belarus

Gymnastics career
- Discipline: Rhythmic gymnastics
- Country represented: Belarus; (2015-present)
- Head coach: Irina Leparskaya
- World ranking: 34 WC 30 WCC (2017 Season)
Medal record
Representing Belarus
Rhythmic Gymnastics
Grand Prix Final
Silver medal – second place	2017 Eilat	All-around
Silver medal – second place	2017 Eilat	Hoop
Silver medal – second place	2017 Eilat	Clubs
Silver medal – second place	2017 Eilat	Ribbon
Summer Universiade
Silver medal – second place	2019 Naples	Hoop
Silver medal – second place	2019 Naples	Ball
Junior European Championships
Silver medal – second place	2016 Holon	Rope
Silver medal – second place	2016 Holon	Team

Yulia Yevgeniyevna Evchik (Belarusian: Юлія Яўгенаўна Еўчык; Russian: Юлия Евгеньевна Евчик, born 2 January 2001) is a Belarusian individual rhythmic gymnast. She is the 2017 Grand Prix Final All-around silver medalist. On the junior level, she is the 2016 European Junior rope silver medalist.

== Career ==
=== Junior ===
Evchik began appearing internationally at the 2014 Miss Valentine Cup. In 2015, she competed at the 2015 Moscow Junior Grand Prix winning silver in the all-around behind Alina Ermolova. She also competed in the Junior World Cup series, she won team silver at the 2015 Lisboa Junior World Cup and individual silver medals in hoop, ball, and clubs. In 2016, Evchik won team silver at the 2016 Moscow Junior Grand Prix and won team gold at the 2016 Guadalajara Junior World Cup.

At the 2016 European Junior Championships in Holon, Evchik won two silver medals in team (together with Yulja Isachanka, Alina Harnasko) and individual rope final.

=== Senior ===
In the 2017 season, Evchik competed at the Baltic Hoop, winning the bronze medal in the all-around. She qualified to the all apparatus finals, winning gold in hoop and silver in clubs. She competed at the Marina Lobatch Cup in Minsk and won gold in the all-around. At the Tashkent World Cup she finished 13th in the all-around ahead of Olena Diachenko and qualified to ribbon final finishing 7th. At the 2017 Corbeil-Essonnes Tournament, Evchik finished 4th in the all-around, qualified in three apparatus finals and won three bronze medals in hoop, clubs, and ribbon. On June 2–4, Evchik competed in the World Challenge Cup challenger series at the 2017 Guadalajara World Cup, where she finished 8th in all-around, qualified in two event finals, and took bronze in ribbon and 5th in clubs. She won bronze in all-around at the 2017 Brno Grand Prix. On November 5–6, Evchik competed at the 2017 Dalia Kutkaite Cup, finishing 6th in the all-around behind Katrin Taseva.

In the 2018 season, On March 15–18, Evchik competed at the 2018 Grand Prix Kiev, finishing 6th in the all-around, In the event finals, she won bronze in the ribbon and finished 5th in hoop. On March March 24–25, she finished 11th in the all-around at the 2018 Thiais Grand Prix. On April 6–8, she won the bronze medal in the all-around at the MTM Ljubljana tournament, then she qualified in ball apparatus finals winning gold with hoop, bronze with ribbon, 5th with clubs and 7th with ball. On April 20–22, at the 2018 Tashkent World Cup, she finished 7th in the all-around behind Bulgaria's Neviana Vladinova. On May 16–17, Evchik competed at the 2018 Holon Grand Prix, finishing 5th in the all-around behind teammate Katsiaryna Halkina. She qualified in three apparatus finals, finishing 4th in clubs and 8th in hoop and ball.

== Routine music information ==
Year	Apparatus	Music title
2019
2019	Hoop	Tango (Instrumental) by Mgzavrebi
2019	Ball	L'amour Plus Fort Que La Mort (from Dracula, l'amour plus fort que la mort) by Florent Torres
2019	Clubs	Stampede (Feat. Lindsey Stirling) by Alexander Jean
2019	Ribbon	Last Light by Bilen Yildirir
2018
2018	Hoop	Gli zingari by Gilda Giuliani
2018	Ball	I Koupasti by George Perris
2018	Clubs	Flight of the Bumblebee by Bel Suono
2018	Ribbon	Roses of Istanbul by Bilen Yildirir
2017
2017	Hoop	Summer storm (4 seasons/ summer) by Ikuko Kawai
2017	Ball (first)	?
2017	Ball (second)	Kupalinka - Belarusian folk song
2017	Ball (three)	L'amour plus fort que la mort by Dracula, L'amour Plus Fort La Mort
Clubs	I wanna dance by Artem Uzunov	
Ribbon (first)	Kupalinka - Belarusian folk song	
Ribbon (second)	?	
Ribbon (three)	Roses of Istanbul by Bilen Yildirir	
