= Alina Harnasko =

Belarusian rhythmic gymnast (born 2001)

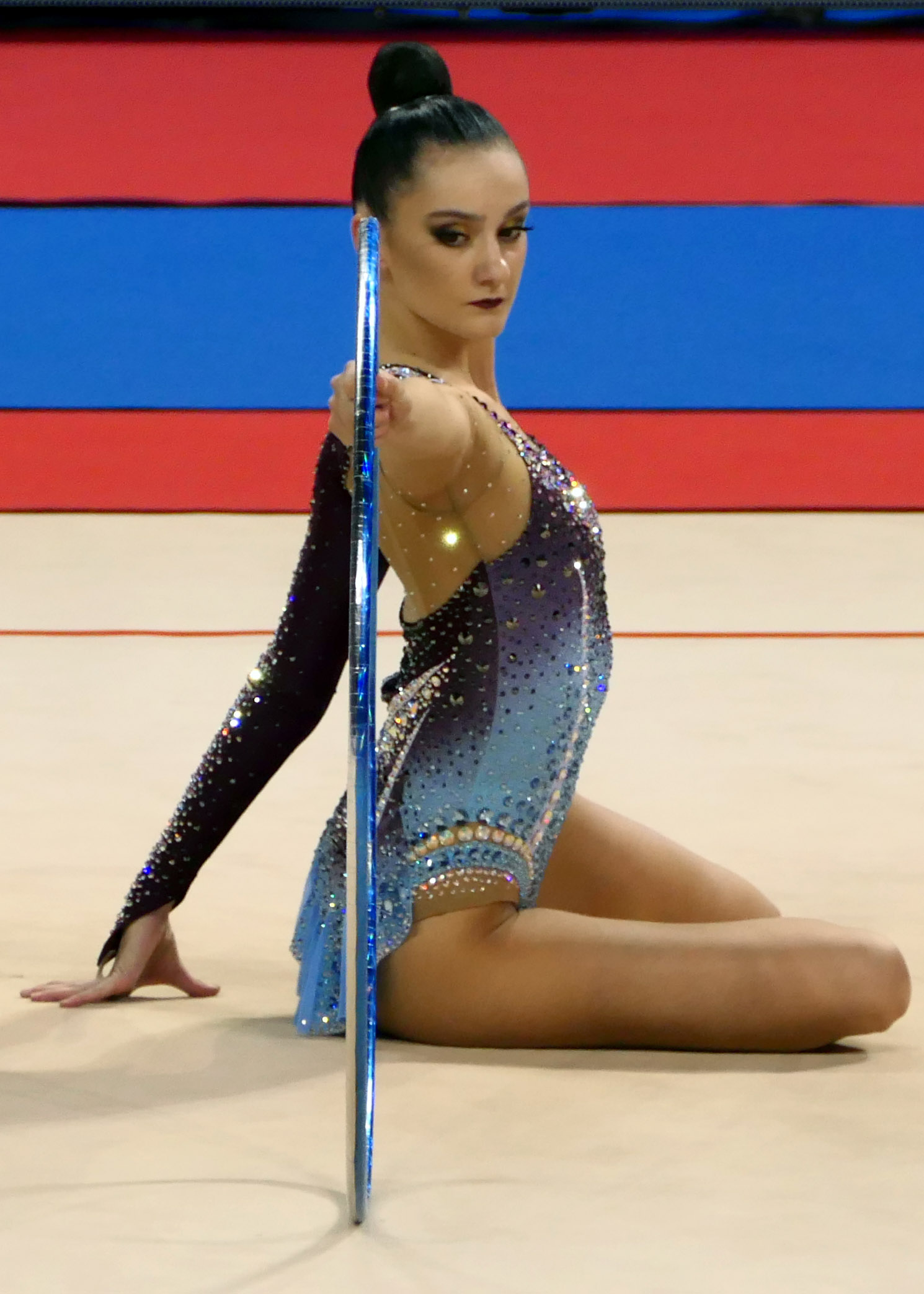
- Harnasko in 2024

Personal information
- Full name: Alina Aliaksandraŭna Harnasko
- Alternative name: Alina Aleksandrovna Gornosko
- Born: 9 August 2001 (age 25) Minsk, Belarus
- Height: 174 cm (5 ft 9 in)

Gymnastics career
- Discipline: Rhythmic gymnastics
- Country represented: Belarus Authorised Neutral Athletes (since 2024); (2015-present)
- Club: Dinamo
- Head coach: Irina Leparskaya
- Assistant coach: Marina Lobatch
- World ranking: 7 WC (2025); 18 WC 13 WCC (2019); 6 WC 3 WCC (2017)
Medal record
Rhythmic gymnastics
Representing Belarus and Authorised Neutral Athletes
Event	1st	2nd	3rd
Olympic Games	0	0	1
World Championships	1	2	3
European Championships	1	9	2
FIG World Cup	13	6	18
Summer Universiade	2	2	0
Grand Prix Final	3	3	2
Total	20	22	26
Olympic Games
Bronze medal – third place	2020 Tokyo	All-Around
World Championships
Gold medal – first place	2021 Kitakyushu	Ribbon
Silver medal – second place	2021 Kitakyushu	All-Around
Silver medal – second place	2021 Kitakyushu	Hoop
Bronze medal – third place	2019 Baku	Team
Bronze medal – third place	2021 Kitakyushu	Team
Bronze medal – third place	2021 Kitakyushu	Ball
European Championships
Silver medal – second place	2017 Budapest	Team
Silver medal – second place	2019 Baku	Team
Silver medal – second place	2020 Kyiv	All-around
Silver medal – second place	2021 Varna	Team
Silver medal – second place	2021 Varna	Ribbon
Silver medal – second place	2026 Varna	Hoop
Bronze medal – third place	2017 Budapest	Ball
Bronze medal – third place	2021 Varna	Ball
Grand Prix Final
Gold medal – first place	2019 Brno	Clubs
Gold medal – first place	2020 Kyiv	Ball
Gold medal – first place	2020 Kyiv	Ribbon
Silver medal – second place	2018 Marbella	All-around
Silver medal – second place	2019 Brno	Ribbon
Silver medal – second place	2020 Kyiv	All-around
Bronze medal – third place	2018 Marbella	Ball
Bronze medal – third place	2020 Kyiv	Clubs
Summer Universiade
Gold medal – first place	2025 Rhine-Rhur	All-around
Gold medal – first place	2025 Rhine-Rhur	Clubs
Silver medal – second place	2025 Rhine-Rhur	Ball
Silver medal – second place	2025 Rhine-Rhur	Ribbon
Junior European Championships
Gold medal – first place	2015 Minsk	5 Balls
Silver medal – second place	2015 Minsk	Group All-around
Silver medal – second place	2016 Holon	Hoop
Silver medal – second place	2016 Holon	Team
- Last updated on: 1 June 2026.

Alina Aliaksandraŭna Harnasko (Belarusian: Аліна Аляксандраўна Гарнасько; Russian: Али́на Александро́вна Горносько́; born 9 August 2001) is a Belarusian individual rhythmic gymnast. She is the 2020 Olympic all-around bronze medalist, 2021 World Championships all-around silver medalist and ribbon gold medalist, 2020 European all-around silver medalist, the 2025 Summer Universiade all-around gold medalist and twice Grand Prix final all-around silver medalist (2018 & 2020).

== Personal life ==
She studies coaching at Belarusian State University of Physical Culture in Minsk.

== Junior ==
=== 2015 ===
Harnasko has won numerous medals in the Junior World Cup and Junior Grand Prix series. She briefly competed as a member of the Belarusian Group that competed at the 2015 European Junior Championships where Belarus won Group silver in the all-around and gold in 5 Balls. Right after, she started competing as individual again. In October, she competed at her first individual competition that year, the International Tournament Tart Cup. She took the bronze medal in the Junior all-around (59.500) behind Anna Sokolova and Maria Sergeeva.

=== 2016 ===
In 2016, she started the competition season in Hungary at International Tournament Gracia Fair Cup, where she won gold all-around medal in junior category. At the International Tournament Alina Cup in Moscow, she won gold in clubs and rope, bronze in hoop and silver in Team competition. She also competed at International Tournament Baltic Hoop in Riga, Latvia, winning silver medal in Junior all-around.

At the 2016 European Junior Championships in Holon, Harnasko won two silver medals, one in teams (together with Yulia Isachanka and Julia Evchik) and one in the individual hoop final (tied with Israel's Nicol Zelikman). On 9–11 September, Harnasko, together with senior teammates Katsiaryna Halkina and Hanna Bazhko, represented team Dinamo at the annual 2016 Aeon Cup in Tokyo, where they won the team silver. Harnasko won silver in the junior all-around.

== Senior ==
=== 2017 ===
Harnasko made her senior international debut competing at the L.A. Lights. She then competed at the Senior International tournament in Moscow, the Alina Cup where she finished 4th in the all-around behind Israel's Nicol Zelikman. At the 2017 Grand Prix Kyiv she finished 10th in the all-around. She finished 5th in the all-around at the 2017 Grand Prix Thiais, she qualified to 3 apparatus finals and won a bronze in clubs. From 31 March – 2 April, Harnasko competed at the Grand Prix Marbella finishing 9th in the all-around and qualified 2 event finals, where she won bronze in ribbon.

She competed in her first World Cup meet at the Pesaro World Cup, where she finished 8th in the all-around behind Israel's Victoria Veinberg Filanovsky, she qualified to 2 apparatus finals finishing 5th in clubs and 7th in hoop. At the 2017 Baku World Cup, she finished 4th in the all-around finals, behind Bulgaria's Neviana Vladinova, and also won a bronze in the ribbon and hoop in the apparatus finals. On 5–7 May, Harnasko competed at the 2017 Sofia World Cup again finishing 4th in the all-around, she qualified in 3 apparatus finals and won gold in clubs ahead of hometown girl Neviana Vladinova, bronze in ball and placed 7th in ribbon.

On 19–21 May, Harnasko and her teammate Katsiaryna Halkina represented the individual seniors for Belarus at the 2017 European Championships. She qualified for all apparatus finals taking bronze in ball, finished 4th in clubs, 5th in ribbon and 7th in hoop. Harnasko's next event was at the 2017 World Challenge Cup Guadalajara where she won bronze in the all-around behind Ekaterina Selezneva. She qualified in 3 apparatus finals: taking silver in hoop, bronze in ball and placed 7th in clubs. On 7–9 July, Harnasko finished 16th in the all-around at the 2017 Berlin World Challenge Cup, she qualified in ribbon final.

Harnasko competed at the quadrennial held 2017 World Games in Wrocław, Poland from 20–30 July. She qualified for two apparatus finals, finishing 4th in hoop and ball. On 4–6 August, Harnasko competed at the 2017 Minsk World Challenge Cup, winning silver in the all-around behind Aleksandra Soldatova. She qualified for all four apparatus finals, taking two silver medals in ball and ribbon and a bronze in clubs. With hoop, she finished 7th. On 11–13 August, Harnasko competed at the 2017 Kazan World Challenge Cup finishing 9th in the all-around, she qualified in the hoop final and finished in 5th.

On 30 August – 3 September, Harnasko and Katsiaryna Halkina represented in the individual competitions for Belarus at the 2017 World Championships in Pesaro, Italy; she qualified in the clubs final and finished in 7th place. Harnasko finished 13th in the all-around final behind Japan's Sumire Kita On 29 September – 1 October, Harnasko was scheduled to compete at the annual World Club Cup known as the Aeon Cup in Tokyo, Japan; however, she withdrew before the start of competition because of injury. She underwent a knee surgery on 8 November in Berlin, Germany.

=== 2018 ===
Harnasko started the season at Baltic Hoop in Riga, Latvia where she took 9th place in the all-around and silver medal in the ball final. She then took silver medal in the all-around at the International Tournament Deriguina Cup in Kyiv and then sat out from competitions for the rest of the season recovering from an ankle surgery, which she had in April. She also suffered a back injury, which meant she could not compete for most of the year.

Near the end of the season, she competed at Grand Prix Marbella in Spain from 26–28 October. There she finished second in the all-around behind Ukraine's Vlada Nikolchenko. She qualified to all apparatus finals and placed 3rd in ball, 5th with hoop, and 7th in clubs and ribbon.

=== 2019 ===
In 2019, Harnasko started the season at L.A. Lights, where she won gold in the all-around and clubs, won bronze with hoop and ball, and placed 5th with ribbon. She scored 22,200 points with clubs, which was her personal best. Then she competed at Grand Prix Kyiv, in Ukraine, where she finished 9th in the all-around. She qualified to the ball and clubs finals and placed 4th in both.

Harnasko's next competition was an international tournament in Corbeil-Essonnes, France, where she won the all-around competition and qualified to all finals. She won three more medals there: bronze with hoop, silver with clubs and gold with ribbon. In April, she competed at World Cup Pesaro and took 12th place in the all-around. The next day, she won bronze medals in both the clubs and ribbon finals. She also qualified to two apparatus finals at World Cup Sofia, where she took 7th place in the all-around.

On 16–19 May, Harnasko competed at the 2019 European Championships in Baku, Azerbaijan with her teammates Katsiaryna Halkina and Anastasiia Salos. They won the silver medal in the team competition together with Belarusian junior group. Harnasko also qualified to the ball final, where she ended in 8th place (18.800). Her next competition was Grand Prix Holon in Israel, where she finished on 4th place in the all-around.

On 30 August – 1 September she competed at World Challenge Cup Kazan, in Russia. She placed 14th in the all-around and qualified to the hoop and clubs finals, where she won bronze medals. On 6–8 September, she took bronze medal in the all-around at World Challenge Cup in Portimão, Portugal. She took another bronze medal in the hoop final behind Alexandra Agiurgiuculese and teammate Anastasiia Salos the next day.

On 16–22 September, Harnasko, Katsiaryna Halkina and Anastasiia Salos represented Belarus in the individual competition at the 2019 World Championships in Baku, Azerbaijan. They won the bronze medal in the team competition. Harnasko placed 16th in the all-around qualifications but did not advance into the all-around finals due to the rule that only two gymnasts per country could do so. However, she qualified for the clubs and ribbon finals and finished in 6th place in both.

In October, she competed at the annual World Club Cup known as the Aeon Cup in Tokyo, Japan, representing Dinamo with Katsiaryna Halkina and junior Darya Tkatcheva. They took the bronze medal in the team competition behind Russia and Ukraine. She also won a silver medal in the all-around at the Belarusian Championships that year.

=== 2020 ===
Harnasko competed at Grand Prix Brno and won gold medal in all-around in front of Ukrainian Khrystyna Pohranychna and Bulgarian Boryana Kaleyn with the score of 89,950. She qualified to all four finals, winning gold medal in hoop final (23,700) and bronze medal in Ribbon final (20,250). She competed at International Tournament of Marina Lobatch and won gold medal in all-around (105.850) in front of teammate Anastasiia Salos. She won two more golds in the ball and clubs finals and two silver medals in the hoop and ribbon finals. In November, she competed at the 2020 European Championships in Kyiv, Ukraine and won silver medal in all-around, tied with Linoy Ashram (100,900) who took gold.

=== 2021: Olympic year ===
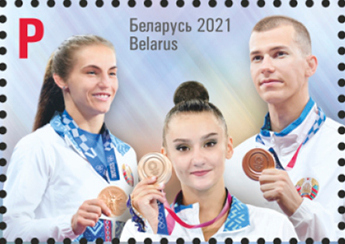
Harnasko on a 2021 stamp of Belarus

Harnasko competed at the Sofia World Cup, finishing 3rd in the all-around behind Boryana Kaleyn, and in the event finals she finished 4th in hoop, 2nd in ball, 7th in clubs and 5th in ribbon.

At the Tashkent World Cup, in April, where she finished 5th behind Sofía Raffaeli in the all-around, and in the event finals she finished 1st ribbon, 3rd in clubs and ball.

At the Baku World Cup, she finished sixth in the all-around behind Linoy Ashram. In the event finals she finished 2nd in ribbon, 3rd in hoop, 6th in ball.

At the Pesaro World Cup, she finished 3rd in the all-around behind Arina Averina, and in the event finals, she finished 5th in hoop, 6th in ball, 4th in clubs and 3rd in ribbon.

In June, she competed at the European Rhythmic Gymnastics Championships, in Varna, Bulgaria, finishing 6th in the all-around final, behind compatriot, Anastasiia Salos. In the event finals, she placed 4th in hoop, 3rd in ball, 6th in clubs and 2nd in ribbon. In the team finals, the Belarus team finished 2nd with Anastasiia Salos and the Belarusian group.

At the Minsk World Cup Challenge, she finished first in the all-around ahead of Lala Kramarenko and Anastasiia Salos. She also won the hoop, ball, and clubs finals.

At the Tel Aviv Grand Prix, she finished 2nd behind Linoy Ashram and ahead of Anastasiia Salos. In the event finals she finished 3rd in hoop and 2nd in ball, clubs, and ribbon.

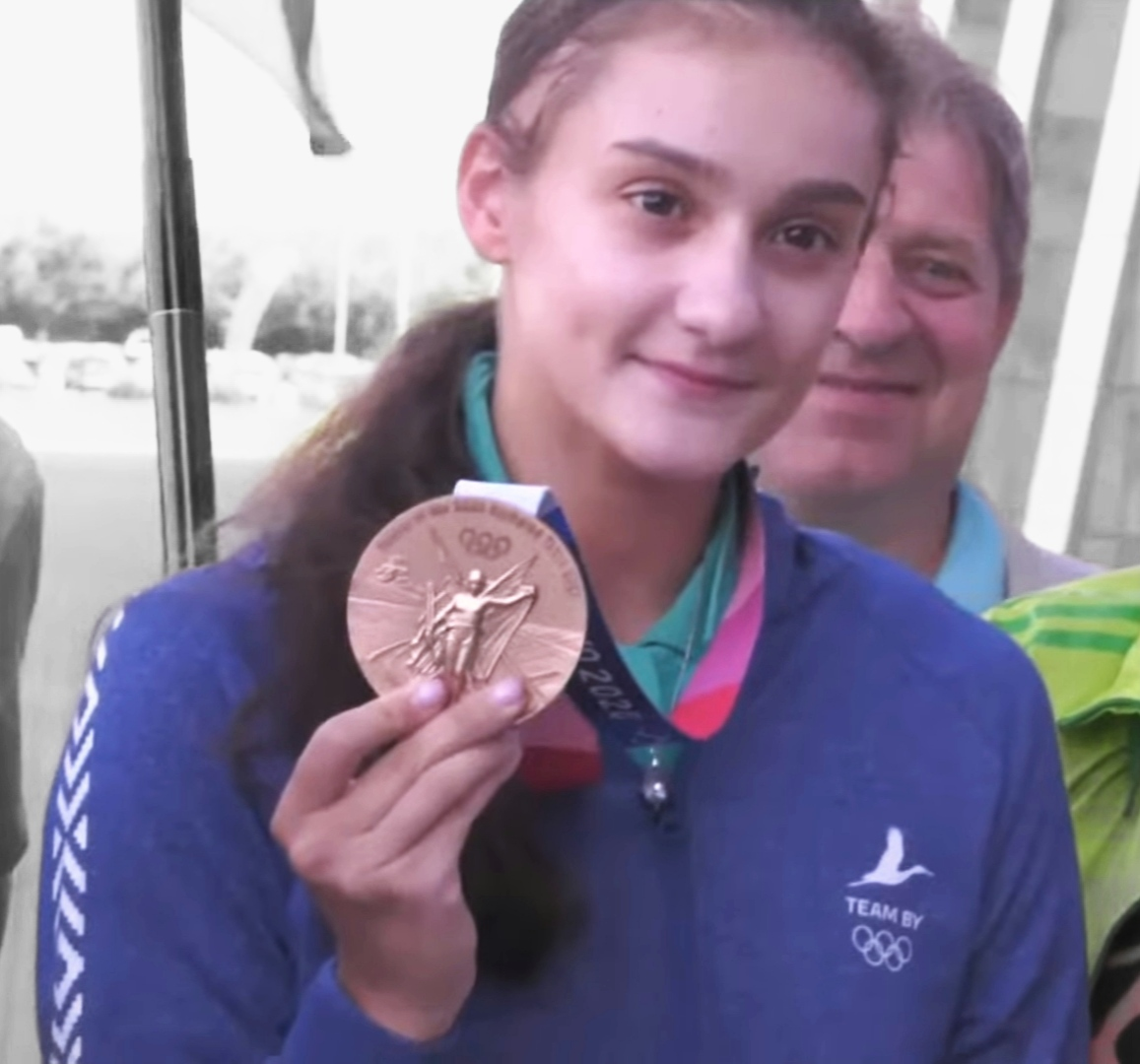
Harnasko holding her 2020 Olympic bronze medal

In August, Harnasko competed at the Tokyo 2020 Olympics. On 6 August, she qualified for the top 10 individual all-around finals after finishing fourth behind Linoy Ashram. On 7 August, Harnasko finished 3rd in the all-around finals behind Linoy Ashram and Dina Averina respectively, after Arina Averina had errors and inaccuracies with her Ribbon routine, she stayed in fourth place, giving Harnasko the opportunity to fight for the Olympic bronze. Harnasko became the fifth Belarusian rhythmic gymnast to medal at an Olympic Game, after Marina Lobatch (Seoul 1988), Yulia Raskina (Sydney 2000), Inna Zhukova (Beijing 2008) and Liubov Charkashyna (London 2012, being the last).

Harnasko withdrew from the Marbella Grand Prix that took place in October. She later confirmed that the reason she did not compete was that she was tested positive for COVID-19. Her compatriot Anastasiia Salos also withdrew her registration the day before due to an injury.

At the 2021 Rhythmic Gymnastics World Championships, Harnasko qualified to the all-around and event finals. She won the ribbon final, took silver with hoop, and won bronze with ball. She also placed 5th in the clubs final. Harnasko became the first non-Russian gymnast to win a gold medal in an event final at the World Championships since Ukraine's Ganna Rizatdinova in 2013 with the hoop. She is also the first Belarusian gymnast to win a gold medal in an event final since Larissa Lukyanenko in 1996 with the rope. She finished second in the individual all-around finals and together with teammate Anastasiia Salos and the Belarusian Senior group, they finished 3rd in the team event.

=== 2022 ===
In 2022, Harnasko started the season at Grand Prix Tartu, in Estonia. She won the gold medal in the all-around and the hoop, ball and ribbon finals, in addition to silver in the clubs final.

On 7 March, the International Gymnastics Federation (FIG) banned all Russian and Belarusian athletes from competing until further notice due to the Russian invasion of Ukraine.

=== 2023 ===
Though she was unable to compete internationally, Harnasko competed in Omsk, Russia at a tournament held by Evgeniya Kanaeva. In August, she competed at the 2023 CIS Games in her hometown Minsk, where she won the all-around silver medal and received an artistry award from Alina Kabaeva.

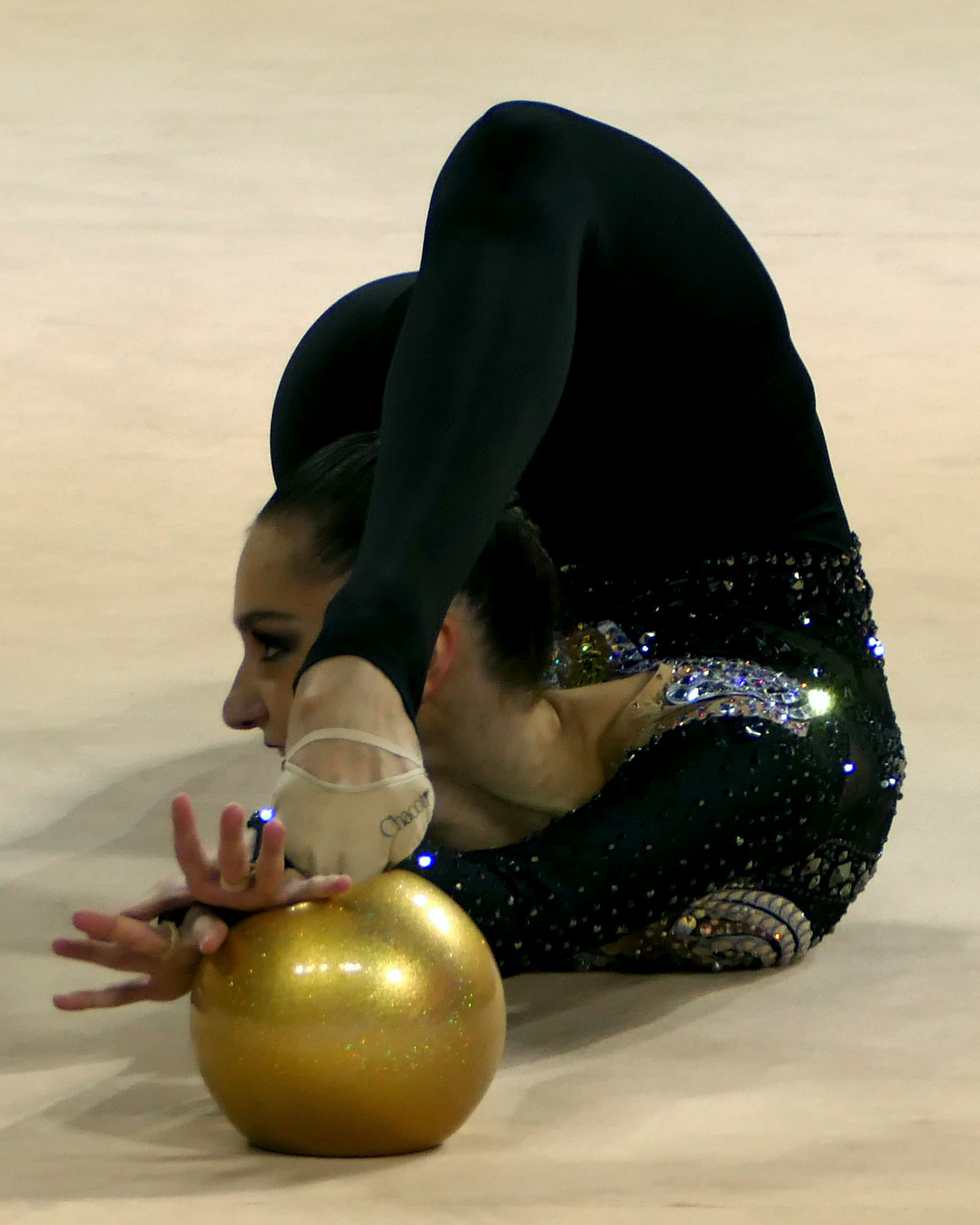
Harnasko at the 2024 Sofia World Cup

=== 2024 ===
In 2024, the FIG began to allow Belarusian athletes to compete under a neutral flag, but only as individual gymnasts, not in groups.

On 22–24 March, Harnasko made her first appearance at FIG World Cup series after two years in Palaio Faliro, Athens, Greece. She won the bronze medal in the all-around and qualified to the ribbon final, where she won gold. The next month, she competed at the World Cup in Sofia, where she finished 9th in the all-around. She qualified to the hoop, clubs, and ball finals, with her best placement being fourth in the hoop final.

=== 2025 ===
On 4–6 April, she competed at the Sofia World Cup, where she took 4th place in the all-around and won a silver medal in the ball final. On 18–20 April, she competed at the Baku World Cup and finished 5th in the all-around. She qualified to three apparatus finals. She won the bronze medal in the ball final and was 8th in hoop and 6th in clubs. On 9–11 May, she competed at the World Challenge Cup Portimão and won all five gold medals in the all-around and the apparatus finals.

On 17–19 July she won the all-around gold medal at the 2025 Summer Universiade in Essen. In the apparatus finals, she took gold in clubs and silver in ball and ribbon.

=== 2026 ===
Harnasko began her 2026 season by competing at the Marbella Grand Prix, where she took 6th place in the all-around. At the end of March, she competed at the Sofia World Cup, where she finished 4th in the all-around. In the apparatus finals, she won the silver medal in ribbon and took 6th place in the hoop final. In April, she won the all-around gold medal at Thiais Grand Prix, which was her first all-around gold since 2022. She also won gold medals in the ball and ribbon finals and a silver in the clubs final. Later in April, she took 16th place in the all-around at Baku World Cup. She was 5th in hoop and 7th in the clubs final. On 15–17 May, she competed at Portimao World Challenge Cup and took 5th place in all-around. She also won the bronze medal in the ribbon final behind Vera Tugolukova.

== Routine music information ==
Year	Apparatus	Music title
2026
2026	Hoop	Black Heart by Jake Warren & Dana Kelson
2026	Ball	La Última Curda by Yasmin Levy
2026	Clubs	Perpetuum by Jo Blankenburg
2026	Ribbon	Suite no.7 in G-minor: No. 6: Passacaglia - Arr. for Piano by Thomas Krüger, George Frideric Handel
2025
2025	Hoop	Black Heart by Jake Warren & Dana Kelson
2025	Ball	La Última Curda by Yasmin Levy
2025	Clubs	Perpetuum by Jo Blankenburg
2025	Ribbon	Le temps des cathédrales (From "Notre-Dame de Paris")
2024
2024	Hoop	T'es oú by Camille Lellouche
2024	Ball	Big Spender (from Sweet Charity) by Fosse Ensemble & Valarie Pettiford
2024	Clubs	Porto by Dulce Pontes
2024	Ribbon	Histoire du tango: Nightclub 1960 by Agustín Hadelich y Pablo Sainz Villegas
2023
2023	Hoop	We Are Justice by Gabriel Saban
2023	Ball	Le Di A la Caza Alcance by Estrella Morente
2023	Clubs	Porto by Dulce Pontes
2023	Ribbon	Histoire du tango: Nightclub 1960 by Agustín Hadelich y Pablo Sainz Villegas
2022
2022	Hoop	
2022	Ball	Le Di A la Caza Alcance by Estrella Morente
2022	Clubs	Yas mowed clover (Jackpot Hot Remix) by Misha FM
2022	Ribbon	Vanity by Brand X Music
2021
2021	Hoop	Moonlight Sonata by Tommee Profitt
2021	Ball	The Hardest Button to Button by The White Stripes
2021	Clubs	L'assasymphonie from Mozart, l'Opéra Rock by Florent Mothe
2021	Ribbon	Nocturne by Yuri Vesnyak
2020
2020	Hoop	Concerto in F by George Gershwin
2020	Ball	The Hardest Button to Button by The White Stripes
2020	Clubs	L'assasymphonie from Mozart, l'Opéra Rock by Florent Mothe
2020	Ribbon	Danu Dana by Aleksey Rybnikov
2019
2019	Hoop	Les Parapluies des Cherbourg by Susi Hyldgaard
2019	Ball	Il est où le bonheur by Christophe Maé
2019	Clubs	Rhapsody on a Theme of Paganini by Vladimir Ashkenazy, London Symphony Orchestra, André Previn
2019	Ribbon	Caravan by The Brian Setzer Orchestra
2018
2018	Hoop	Les Parapluies des Cherbourg by Susi Hyldgaard
2018	Ball	Historia de un amor by Brendon Stoun
2018	Clubs	Rhapsody on a Theme of Paganini by Vladimir Ashkenazy, London Symphony Orchestra, André Previn
2018	Ribbon	Caravan by The Brian Setzer Orchestra
2017	Hoop	Game On by Hans Zimmer
2017	Ball	Romance by Dmitri Shostakovich
2017	Clubs	Carmen's Story by Edith Piaf
2017	Ribbon	Korebeiniki
2016	Rope	Tschubtschik by Khoronko Orchestra
2016	Hoop	The Second Waltz by André Rieu
2016	Ball	Libertango by Astor Piazzola
2016	Clubs	Luna mezz'o mare by Patrizio Buanne

== Detailed Olympic results ==
Year	Competition Description	Location	Music	Apparatus	Rank-Final	Score-Final	Rank-Qualifying	Score-Qualifying
2020	Olympics	Tokyo		all-around	3rd	102.700	4th	99.250
2020	Olympics	Tokyo	Moonlight Sonata by Tommee Profitt	Hoop	4th	26.500	3rd	26.400
2020	Olympics	Tokyo	The Hardest Button to Button by The White Stripes	Ball	4th	27.500	4th	27.200
2020	Olympics	Tokyo	L'assasymphonie from Mozart, l'Opéra Rock by Florent Mothe	Clubs	4th	27.600	14th	23.900
2020	Olympics	Tokyo	Nocturne by Yuri Vesnyak	Ribbon	8th	21.100	5th	21.750

== Competitive highlights ==
(Team competitions in seniors are held only at the World Championships, Europeans and other Continental Games.)

International: Senior
Year	Event	AA	Team	Hoop	Ball	Clubs	Ribbon
2026	World Championships			20th (Q)		31st (Q)	
2026	World Cup Milan	17th		8th	14th (Q)	34th (Q)	20th (Q)
2026	European Championships	4th	7th	2nd	7th	17th (Q)	14th (Q)
2026	World Challenge Cup Portimão	5th		16th (Q)	7th	5th	3rd
2026	World Cup Baku	16th		5th	11th (Q)	7th	58th (Q)
2026	Grand Prix Thiais	1st		7th	1st	2nd	1st
2026	World Cup Sofia	4th		6th	10th (Q)	10th (Q)	2nd
2026	Grand Prix Marbella	6th			6th	4th	
2025	Summer Universiade	1st		5th	2nd	1st	2nd
2025	World Challenge Cup Portimao	1st		1st	1st	1st	1st
2025	World Cup Baku	5th		8th	3rd	19th (Q)	6th
2025	World Cup Sofia	4th		4th	2nd	5th	17th (Q)
2024	World Challenge Cup Cluj-Napoca	5th		8th	10th (Q)	11th (Q)	4th
2024	World Cup Milan	7th		2nd	4th	12th (Q)	10th (Q)
2024	World Challenge Cup Portimao	2nd		3rd	1st	2nd	16th (Q)
2024	World Cup Baku	7th		13th (Q)	12th (Q)	13th (Q)	4th
2024	World Cup Sofia	9th		4th	5th	8th	17th (Q)
2024	World Cup Palaio Faliro	3rd		17th (Q)	13th (Q)	9th (Q)	1st
2022	Grand Prix Tartu	1st		1st	1st	2nd	1st
2021	World Championships	2nd	3rd	2nd	3rd	5th	1st
2021	Olympic Games	3rd					
2021	Grand Prix Tel Aviv	2nd		3rd	2nd	2nd	2nd
2021	World Cup Minsk	1st		1st	1st	1st	
2021	European Championships	6th	2nd	4th	3rd	6th	2nd
2021	World Cup Pesaro	3rd		5th	6th	4th	3rd
2021	World Cup Baku	6th		3rd	6th	21st (Q)	2nd
2021	World Cup Tashkent	5th		16th (Q)	3rd	3rd	1st
2021	World Cup Sofia	3rd		4th	2nd	7th	5th
2020	European Championships	2nd					
2020	International Tournament of Marina Lobatch	1st		2nd	1st	1st	2nd
2020	Grand Prix Kyiv	2nd		4th	1st	3rd	1st
2020	Grand Prix Brno	1st		1st	9th	4th	3rd
2020	International Tournament Gracia Fair Cup	3rd		3rd (Q)	4th (Q)	2nd (Q)	3rd (Q)
2020	International Tournament Moscow	3rd					
2020	LA Lights Tournament	3rd		5th	3rd	1st	5th
2019	Aeon Cup		3rd				
2019	World Championships	16th (Q)	3rd		18th (Q)	6th	6th
2019	World Cup Portimao	3rd		3rd	4th	4th	7th
2019	World Cup Kazan	14th		3rd	25th (Q)	3rd	34th (Q)
2019	Grand Prix Brno	9th		17th (Q)	5th	1st	2nd
2019	Grand Prix Holon	4th		6th		9th	
2019	European Championships		2nd		8th	11th (Q)	
2019	World Cup Sofia	7th		16th (Q)	5th	4th	11th (Q)
2019	World Cup Pesaro	12th		30th (Q)	15th (Q)	3rd	3rd
2019	Grand Prix Kyiv	9th		11th (Q)	4th	4th	13th (Q)
2018	Grand Prix Marbella	2nd		5th	3rd	7th	7th
2018	International Tournament Deriugina Cup	2nd					
2018	International Tournament Baltic Hoop	9th		7th	2nd	4th	17th (Q)
2017	World Championships	13th		10th (Q)	11th (Q)	7th	14th (Q)
2017	World Cup Kazan	9th		6th (Q)	12th (Q)	9th (Q)	12th (Q)
2017	World Cup Minsk	2nd		7th	2nd	3rd	2nd
2017	World Games			4th	4th	11th (Q)	10th (Q)
2017	World Cup Berlin	18th		21st (Q)	26th (Q)	11th (Q)	6th
2017	World Cup Guadalajara	3rd		2nd	3rd	7th	18th (Q)
2017	European Championships		2nd	7th	3rd	4th	5th
2017	World Cup Sofia	4th		9th (Q)	3rd	1st	7th
2017	World Cup Baku	4th		3rd	4th	5th	3rd
2017	World Cup Pesaro	8th		7th	19th	5th	18th
2017	Grand Prix Marbella	9th		17th (Q)	5th	6th	3rd
2017	Grand Prix Thiais	5th		7th	4th	3rd	17th (Q)
2017	Grand Prix Kyiv	10th		13th (Q)	4th	14th (Q)	9th (Q)
2017	International Tournament Moscow	4th					
International: Junior
Year	Event	AA	Team	Hoop	Ball	Clubs	Ribbon
2016	Aeon Cup	2nd	2nd				
2016	Junior European Championships		2nd	5th (Q)	2nd		8th (Q)
2016	International Tournament Guadalajara		1st	2nd			1st
2016	International Tournament Irina Deleanu Cup		1st			1st	
2016	International Tournament Baltic Hoop	2nd					
2016	International Tournament Alina Cup		2nd	1st	3rd		1st
2016	International Tournament Gracia Fair Cup	1st					
National
Year	Event	AA	Team	Hoop	Ball	Clubs	Ribbon
2020	Belarusian Championships	2nd			1st	1st	1st
2019	Belarusian Championships	2nd		2nd	1st	1st	2nd
Q = Qualifications (Did not advance to Event Final due to the 2 gymnast per country rule, only Top 8 highest score); WR = World Record; WD = Withdrew; NT = No Team Competition; DNS = Did Not Start
