= 2017 FIG Rhythmic Gymnastics World Cup series =

International rhythm gymnastics competition

The 2017 FIG World Cup circuit in Rhythmic Gymnastics is a series of competitions officially organized and promoted by the International Gymnastics Federation.

The main difference introduced in 2017 is that the World Cup series is now split in: 1) the World Cup series; and 2) the World Challenge Cup series. Previously, events at the Rhythmic Gymnastics World Cup series were divided in Category A and Category B; Category A events were reserved for invited athletes, while Category B events were open to all athletes. Also, there was no limit for the number of Category A and Category B meets each year. Now, there is a maximum of four World Cup events. All of the World Cup and World Challenge Cup events are open to all athletes. Winners of the World Cup trophy were announced after the conclusion of the last event in the World Cup series, in Sofia, Bulgaria.

With stopovers in Europe and Asia, the World Cup competitions were scheduled for April 7–9 in Pesaro (ITA), April 21–23 in Tashkent (UZB), April 28–30 in Baku (AZE), and May 5–7 in Sofia (BUL). World Challenge Cup competitions are scheduled for May 12–14 in Portimão (POR), June 2–4 in Guadalajara (ESP), July 7–9 in Berlin (GER), August 5–6 in Minsk (BLR), and August 11–13 in Kazan (RUS).

== Formats ==
World Cup
Date	Event	Location	Type
April 7–9	FIG World Cup 2017	(Italy) Pesaro	Individuals and groups
April 21–23	FIG World Cup 2017	(Uzbekistan) Tashkent	Individuals and groups
April 28–30	FIG World Cup 2017	(Azerbaijan) Baku	Individuals and groups
May 5–7	FIG World Cup 2017	(Bulgaria) Sofia	Individuals and groups

World Challenge Cup
May 12–14	FIG World Challenge Cup 2017	(Portugal) Portimão	Individuals and groups
June 2–4	FIG World Challenge Cup 2017	(Spain) Guadalajara	Individuals and groups
July 7–9	FIG Berlin Masters World Challenge Cup 2017	(Germany) Berlin	Individuals and groups
August 5–6	FIG World Challenge Cup 2017	(Belarus) Minsk	Individuals and groups
August 11–13	FIG World Challenge Cup 2017	(Russia) Kazan	Individuals and groups

== Medal winners ==
=== All-around ===
==== Individual ====
Competitions	Gold	Silver	Bronze
World Cup
Pesaro	(Russia) Aleksandra Soldatova	(Russia) Dina Averina	(Belarus) Katsiaryna Halkina
Tashkent	(Russia) Dina Averina	(Russia) Arina Averina	(Bulgaria) Katrin Taseva
Baku	(Russia) Arina Averina	(Russia) Aleksandra Soldatova	(Bulgaria) Neviana Vladinova
Sofia	(Bulgaria) Neviana Vladinova	(Bulgaria) Katrin Taseva	(Israel) Linoy Ashram
World Challenge Cup
Portimão	(Russia) Yulia Bravikova	(Russia) Elizaveta Lugovskikh	(Israel) Victoria Filanovsky
Guadalajara	(Russia) Polina Khonina	(Russia) Ekaterina Selezneva	(Belarus) Alina Harnasko
Berlin	(Belarus) Katsiaryna Halkina	(Russia) Yulia Bravikova	(Russia) Ekaterina Selezneva
Minsk	(Russia) Aleksandra Soldatova	(Belarus) Alina Harnasko	(Belarus) Katsiaryna Halkina
Kazan	(Russia) Dina Averina	(Russia) Arina Averina	(Belarus) Katsiaryna Halkina

==== Group ====
Competitions	Gold	Silver	Bronze
World Cup
Pesaro	Bulgaria	Italy	Ukraine
Tashkent	Russia	Bulgaria	Belarus
Baku	Bulgaria	Italy	Ukraine
Sofia	Bulgaria	Ukraine	Belarus
World Challenge Cup
Portimão	Italy	Russia	United States
Guadalajara	Russia	Ukraine	Belarus
Berlin	Russia	Ukraine	Belarus
Minsk	Italy	Belarus	Japan
Kazan	Russia	Italy	Japan

=== Apparatus ===
==== Hoop ====
Competitions	Gold	Silver	Bronze
World Cup
Pesaro	(Russia) Aleksandra Soldatova	(Russia) Dina Averina	(United States) Laura Zeng
Tashkent	(Russia) Arina Averina	(Russia) Dina Averina	(Israel) Linoy Ashram
Baku	(Russia) Arina Averina	(Russia) Aleksandra Soldatova	(Belarus) Alina Harnasko
Sofia	(Bulgaria) Neviana Vladinova	(Israel) Linoy Ashram	(Belarus) Katsiaryna Halkina
World Challenge Cup
Portimão	(Israel) Victoria Filanovsky	(Russia) Yulia Bravikova	(Russia) Elizaveta Lugovskikh
Guadalajara	(Russia) Ekaterina Selezneva	(Belarus) Alina Harnasko	(Japan) Kaho Minagawa
Berlin	(Russia) Ekaterina Selezneva	(Italy) Alexandra Agiurgiuculese	(Ukraine) Olena Diachenko
Minsk	(Bulgaria) Neviana Vladinova	(Russia) Aleksandra Soldatova	(Belarus) Katsiaryna Halkina
Kazan	(Russia) Dina Averina	(Russia) Arina Averina	(Israel) Linoy Ashram

==== Ball ====
Competitions	Gold	Silver	Bronze
World Cup
Pesaro	(Russia) Dina Averina	(Russia) Aleksandra Soldatova	(Belarus) Katsiaryna Halkina
Tashkent	(Russia) Arina Averina	(Russia) Dina Averina	(Bulgaria) Katrin Taseva
Baku	(Russia) Aleksandra Soldatova	(Russia) Arina Averina	(Bulgaria) Neviana Vladinova
Sofia	(Bulgaria) Neviana Vladinova	(Italy) Alexandra Agiurgiuculese	(Belarus) Alina Harnasko
World Challenge Cup
Portimão	(Israel) Victoria Filanovsky	(Russia) Elizaveta Lugovskikh	(United States) Nastasya Generalova
Guadalajara	(Russia) Polina Khonina	(Russia) Ekaterina Selezneva	(Belarus) Alina Harnasko
Berlin	(Russia) Ekaterina Selezneva	(Kazakhstan) Sabina Ashirbayeva	(Belarus) Katsiaryna Halkina
Minsk	(Belarus) Katsiaryna Halkina	(Belarus) Alina Harnasko	(Italy) Alexandra Agiurgiuculese
Kazan	(Russia) Arina Averina	(Belarus) Katsiaryna Halkina	(Israel) Linoy Ashram

==== Clubs ====
Competitions	Gold	Silver	Bronze
World Cup
Pesaro	(Russia) Dina Averina	(Belarus) Katsiaryna Halkina	(United States) Laura Zeng
Tashkent	(Russia) Dina Averina	(Bulgaria) Katrin Taseva	(Bulgaria) Boryana Kaleyn
Baku	(Israel) Victoria Filanovsky	(Russia) Aleksandra Soldatova	(Russia) Arina Averina
Sofia	(Belarus) Alina Harnasko	(Bulgaria) Neviana Vladinova	(Israel) Linoy Ashram
World Challenge Cup
Portimão	(Russia) Elizaveta Lugovskikh	(Russia) Yulia Bravikova	(Bulgaria) Boryana Kaleyn
Guadalajara	(Russia) Polina Khonina	(Uzbekistan) Anastasiya Serdyukova	(Ukraine) Viktoria Mazur
Berlin	(Russia) Yulia Bravikova	(Russia) Ekaterina Selezneva	(Belarus) Katsiaryna Halkina
Minsk	(Russia) Yulia Bravikova	(Bulgaria) Neviana Vladinova	(Belarus) Alina Harnasko
Kazan	(Russia) Dina Averina	(Russia) Arina Averina	(Israel) Linoy Ashram

==== Ribbon ====
Competitions	Gold	Silver	Bronze
World Cup
Pesaro	(Russia) Dina Averina	(Russia) Aleksandra Soldatova	(Italy) Alexandra Agiurgiuculese
Tashkent	(Russia) Arina Averina	(Russia) Dina Averina	(Uzbekistan) Anastasiya Serdyukova
Baku	(Bulgaria) Neviana Vladinova	(Russia) Arina Averina	(Belarus) Alina Harnasko
Sofia	(Bulgaria) Neviana Vladinova	(Belarus) Katsiaryna Halkina	(Bulgaria) Katrin Taseva
World Challenge Cup
Portimão	(Israel) Victoria Filanovsky	(Bulgaria) Erika Zafirova	(Russia) Yulia Bravikova
Guadalajara	(Russia) Ekaterina Selezneva	(Uzbekistan) Anastasiya Serdyukova	(Belarus) Julia Evchik
Berlin	(Belarus) Katsiaryna Halkina	(Russia) Yulia Bravikova	(Russia) Ekaterina Selezneva
Minsk	(Russia) Yulia Bravikova	(Belarus) Alina Harnasko	(Bulgaria) Neviana Vladinova
Kazan	(Russia) Arina Averina	(Russia) Dina Averina	(Israel) Linoy Ashram

==== 5 hoops ====
Competitions	Gold	Silver	Bronze
World Cup
Pesaro	Italy	Bulgaria	China
Tashkent	Russia	Bulgaria	Ukraine
Baku	Italy	Belarus	Bulgaria
Sofia	Ukraine	Bulgaria	Belarus
World Challenge Cup
Portimão	Italy	Russia	Spain
Guadalajara	Japan	Belarus	Ukraine
Berlin	Russia	Ukraine	Belarus
Minsk	Bulgaria	Belarus	Japan
Kazan	Russia	Belarus	Japan

==== 3 balls and 2 ropes ====
Competitions	Gold	Silver	Bronze
World Cup
Pesaro	Italy	Russia	Ukraine
Tashkent	Bulgaria	Ukraine	Russia
Baku	Ukraine	Bulgaria	Belarus
Sofia	Ukraine	Bulgaria	Belarus
World Challenge Cup
Portimão	Italy	Russia	United States
Guadalajara	Russia	Ukraine	Japan
Berlin	Russia	Ukraine	Azerbaijan
Minsk	Belarus	Italy	Bulgaria
Kazan	Russia	Bulgaria	Belarus

== Overall medal table ==
Rank	Nation	Gold	Silver	Bronze	Total
1	Russia (RUS)	41	31	6	78
2	Bulgaria (BUL)	11	12	10	33
3	Italy (ITA)	7	6	2	15
4	Belarus (BLR)	5	12	24	41
5	Israel (ISR)	4	1	8	13
6	Ukraine (UKR)	3	7	7	17
7	Japan (JPN)	1	0	6	7
8	Uzbekistan (UZB)	0	2	1	3
9	Kazakhstan (KAZ)	0	1	0	1
10	United States (USA)	0	0	5	5
11	Azerbaijan (AZE)	0	0	1	1
11	China (CHN)	0	0	1	1
11	Spain (ESP)	0	0	1	1
Totals (13 entries)		72	72	72	216

== Overall winners ==
The overall winners of the World Cup trophy were announced after the conclusion of the final stage, in Sofia, on May 7, 2017. Neviana Vladinova (BUL) was the individual all-around overall winner with 115 points, the ball winner with 115 points and the ribbon winner with 135 points. Arina Averina (RUS) was the hoop winner with 100 points, and Alina Harnasko (BLR) was the clubs winner with 135 points.

== See also ==
- 2017 FIG Artistic Gymnastics World Cup series
- 2017 Rhythmic Gymnastics Grand Prix circuit
