= Shani Kataev =

Israeli rhythmic gymnast

- שני קטייב
- Born: April 12, 2003 (age 23) Israel

Gymnastics career
- Discipline: Rhythmic gymnastics
- Country represented: Israel
Medal record
Representing Israel
Rhythmic gymnastics
Junior European Championships
Bronze medal – third place	2017 Budapest	10 Clubs

Shani Kataev (Hebrew: שני קטייב; born April 12, 2003, in Israel) is an Israeli athlete competing in group rhythmic gymnastics.

== Rhythmic gymnastics career ==
=== Junior ===
In 2017, she joined Israeli junior group and competed at International Tournament Alina Cup in Moscow, where they took silver medal in Group All-around behind Russia. At the 2017 Junior European Championships in Budapest, Hungary they won silver medal in 10 Clubs final. She competed at the 2018 Junior European Championships in Guadalajara, Spain, where she placed 19th in Hoop and 16th in Ball Qualifications.

=== Senior ===
She competed at the 2019 World Cup Pesaro and ended on 33rd place in All-around.

== See also ==
- List of medalists at the Rhythmic Gymnastics Junior European Championships
