= Neviana Vladinova =

Bulgarian rhythmic gymnast (born 1994)

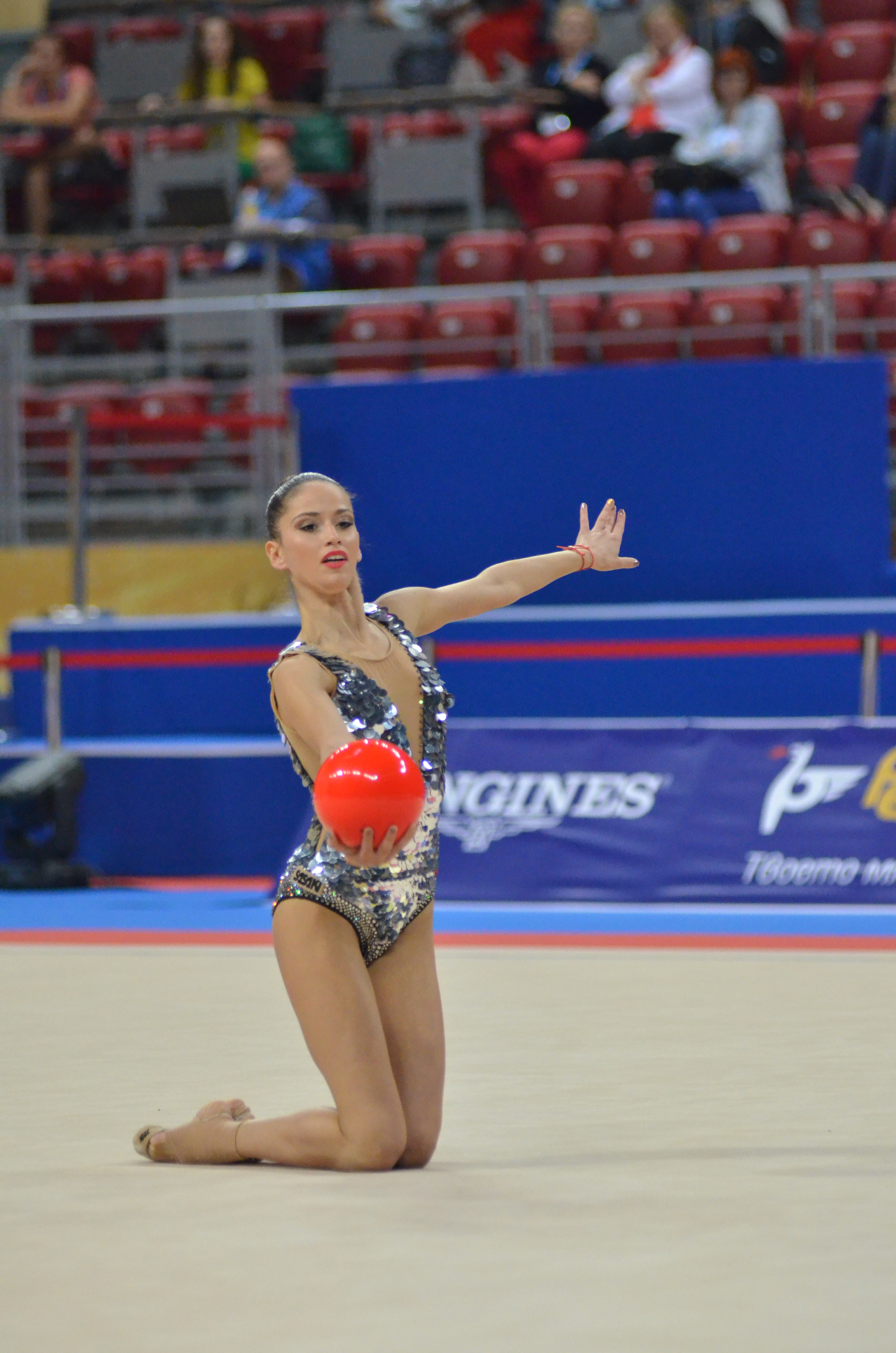

Personal information
- Full name: Neviana Stanimirova Vladinova
- Alternative name: Neviana
- Nickname: Nevi
- Born: 23 February 1994 (age 32) Pleven, Bulgaria
- Height: 166 cm (5 ft 5 in)

Gymnastics career
- Discipline: Rhythmic gymnastics
- Country represented: Bulgaria; (2013 - 2020)
- Former countries represented: Bulgaria
- Club: Levski
- Head coach: Branimira Markova
- Assistant coach: Silviya Stoyneva
- Choreographer: Gocha Budagashvili
- Retired: 2020
- World ranking: 1 WC 7 WCC (2017 Season); 10 (2016 Season); 12 (2015 Season); 15 (2014 Season); 25 (2013 Season)
Medal record
International Gymnastics Competitions
Event	1st	2nd	3rd
World Championships	0	1	1
European Championships	0	0	3
FIG World Cup	6	4	4
Grand Prix	0	5	4
Total	6	10	12
Representing Bulgaria
Rhythmic Gymnastics
World Championships
Silver medal – second place	2018 Sofia	Team
Bronze medal – third place	2017 Pesaro	Ball
European Championships
Bronze medal – third place	2017 Budapest	Ribbon
Bronze medal – third place	2017 Budapest	Team
Bronze medal – third place	2019 Baku	Team

Neviana Stanimirova Vladinova (Bulgarian: Невяна Станимирова Владинова, born 23 February 1994) is a retired Bulgarian individual rhythmic gymnast. She is the 2017 World bronze medalist with ball, and was seventh in the all-around at the Rio 2016 Olympics.

== Career ==
=== Career beginnings ===
Born in Pleven, Bulgaria, Vladinova began competitive gymnastics in 2000. She appeared in international junior competitions in 2006 and began competing as a senior in 2011 season. In 2013, Vladinova competed at the World Cup series and Grand Prix series. She was in the Bulgarian team that competed at the 2013 European Championships. Vladinova retired on November 17, 2020, due to a neck injury. She is now the second vice president of the BFHG

=== 2014 season ===
In 2014, Vladinova made her breakthrough season, her first event at the Moscow Grand Prix she took 4th place in hoop finals. She competed at the 2014 World Cup series in Debrecen, she finished 8th in all-around and qualified in hoop finals. In Stuttgart, she finished 9th in all-around, placed 18th in Pesaro all-around and In Sofia, where she placed 9th in all-around, and qualified to 2 event finals finishing 6th in clubs and 4th in hoop. She competed at the 2014 European Championships where she finished 13th in all-around behind Israeli gymnast Victoria Veinberg Filanovsky. Vladinova competed at the 2014 World Championships with Team Bulgaria finishing 7th, she finished 25th in all-around qualifications, missing out of the top 24 finals. She ended her season competing in the 2014 Grand Prix Final winning bronze in all-around and won 3 apparatus medals: (2 silver: clubs, ribbon), (bronze: ball).

=== 2015 season ===
On March 21–22, 2015, Vladinova competed at the 2015 Thiais Grand Prix finishing 21st in the all-around. On March 27–29, Vladinova competed at the 2015 Lisboa World Cup finishing 12th in the all-around. On April 10–12, Vladinova finished 24th in the all-around at the 2015 Pesaro World Cup. Vladinova competed at the 2015 Holon Grand Prix finishing 10th in all-around. On May 22–24, Vladinova competed at the 2015 Tashkent World Cup finishing 8th in the all-around. She qualified to 2 apparatus finals. On June 15–21, Vladinova competed at the inaugural 2015 European Games where she finished 12th in the all-around. On August 15–17, Vladinova competed at the 2015 Sofia World Cup and finished 7th in the all-around ahead of Azeri gymnast Marina Durunda. She qualified to all apparatus finals, finishing 5th in ball, 7th in hoop, clubs and 6th in ribbon. At the 2015 World Cup Final in Kazan, Vladinova finished 8th in the all-around. On September 9–13, Vladinova competed at the 2015 World Championships in Stuttgart and finished 10th in the All-around finals with a total of 70.115 points.

=== 2016 season ===
In 2016, Vladinova began her season competing at the 2016 Grand Prix Moscow finishing 13th in the all-around. On March 17–20, she then competed at the 2016 Lisboa World Cup where she finished 6th in the all-around with a total of 70.250 points, she also qualified to hoop, ribbon and clubs final. On April 1–3, Vladinova competed at the 2016 Pesaro World Cup where she finished 9th in the all-around with a total of 70.550 points. She finished 8th in the all-around (total: 70.500) at the 2016 Minsk World Cup and qualified to all 4 apparatus finals. On May 27–29, Vladinova finished 6th in the all-around at the 2016 Sofia World Cup with a total of 71.250 points, she qualified in 3 apparatus finals finishing 5th in hoop, 6th in ball and won bronze in ribbon, her first World Cup medal. Vladinova then finished 9th in the all-around at the 2016 Guadalajara World Cup and qualified to hoop final. On June 17–19, Vladinova competed at the 2016 European Championships where she finished in 10th place with a total of 71.807 points. On July 22–24, culminating the World Cup of the season in 2016 Baku World Cup, Vladinova finished 6th in the all-around with a total of 71.750 points, she qualified to 3 apparatus finals.

==== 2016 Rio de Janeiro Olympics ====
On August 19–20, Vladinova competed at the 2016 Summer Olympics held in Rio de Janeiro, Brazil. She qualified to the rhythmic gymnastics individual all-around final where she finished in 7th place with a total of 70.733 points.

=== 2017 season ===
In 2017, Vladinova competed at the 2017 Grand Prix Moscow finishing 4th in the all-around and qualified to all the apparatus finals, placing 4th in hoop, ribbon, 5th in ball and 7th in clubs. On March 31 - April 2, Vladinova competed at the 2017 Grand Prix Marbella finishing 4th in the all-around behind Russia's Iuliia Bravikova, she qualified to all the apparatus finals winning 3 silver medal in clubs, ribbon, ball and a bronze in hoop. At the 2017 Pesaro World Cup, Valdinova finished 6th in the all-around behind teammate Katrin Taseva. She also qualified in 2 apparatus finals finishing 4th in ribbon and 6th in ball. In April Vladinova participated in the 2017 Baku World Cup where she won her first all-around medal from a world cup, a bronze. She qualified for all 4 finals, finishing 4th in hoop and clubs, taking another bronze with ball and her first ever title from a WC - a gold with ribbon. A week later Vladinova dominated in the all-around at the 2017 Sofia World Cup claiming her first all-around title, she won 3 more gold medals in the apparatus finals - with hoop, ball and ribbon, and a silver with clubs, thus becoming the winner of the 2017 FIG World Cup in the All-Around, with ball and ribbon. At the same competition, Neviana was also voted "Queen of the world cup" by all the accredited journalists present and was awarded a special tiara. At the 2017 European Championships, Vladinova, along with Katrin Taseva and the Bulgarian junior group (Maria Spasova, Bilyana Vezirska, Bilyana Pisova, Boyana Gelova and Galateya Gerova) won the team all-around bronze medal, behind Russia and Belarus. She qualified in all the apparatus finals finishing 8th in hoop, 4th in ball, 5th in clubs and a bronze in ribbon. Vladinova competed at the quadrennial held 2017 World Games in Wrocław, Poland from July 20–30, she qualified in all the apparatus finals finishing 8th in hoop, 5th in ball, 7th in clubs and 4th in ribbon. On August 5–7, Vladinova finished 5th in the all-around behind Russia's Iuliia Bravikova at the 2017 Minsk World Challenge Cup, she qualified in all apparatus finals and won gold medal in hoop ahead of Aleksandra Soldatova, she also won silver in clubs, a bronze in ribbon and finished 7th in ball. On August 11–13, Vladinova competed at the 2017 Kazan World Challenge Cup finishing 5th in the all-around behind Linoy Ashram, she qualified in 3 apparatus finals and finished 7th in hoop, ball and ribbon. On August 30 - September 3, Vladinova and Katrin Taseva represented in the individual competitions for Bulgaria at the 2017 World Championships in Pesaro, Italy; she qualified in 3 apparatus finals: finishing 4th in clubs, 5th in hoop and won a bronze medal in ball. Vladinova finished 7th in the all-around final behind Laura Zeng. On November 5–6, Vladinova competed at the 2017 Dalia Kutkaite Cup finishing 4th in the all-around.

=== 2018 season ===
In 2018, Vladinova sustained an injury early in the season. On April 13–15; she returned to competition at the 2018 Pesaro World Cup finishing 7th in the all-around; she qualified in 3 event finals placing 8th in hoop, 5th in ball and 7th in clubs. On April 20–22, at the 2018 Tashkent World Cup, Vladinova finished 6th in the all-around behind Israel's Nicol Zelikman, she qualified to 3 apparatus finals.

=== 2019 season ===
Vladinova finished fourth with hoop at the 2019 European Championships in Baku. At the 2019 World Championships she helped the Bulgarian team to a sixth-place finish.

=== Retirement ===
Vladinova retired from competition in November 2020 due to a neck injury. She is now a vice president of the Bulgarian gymnastics federation.

== Detailed Olympic results ==
Year	Competition Description	Location	Music	Apparatus	Rank-Finals	Score-Finals	Rank-Qualifying	Score-Qualifying
2016	Olympics	Rio de Janeiro		All-around	7th	70.733	6th	70.966
2016	Olympics	Rio de Janeiro	"Schindler's List" by John Williams	Hoop	7th	17.883	6th	17.666
2016	Olympics	Rio de Janeiro	"Tanguera" by Sexteto Mayor	Ball	7th	17.750	6th	17.700
2016	Olympics	Rio de Janeiro	"Mixed - Ouverture, Nostalic, Extreme, Delirium" by Les Tambours du Bronx	Clubs	4th	18.050	6th	17.800
2016	Olympics	Rio de Janeiro	"Buleria" by David Bisbal	Ribbon	8th	17.050	6th	17.800

== Routine music information ==
Year	Apparatus	Music title
2019	Hoop	Verdi: Requiem, Dies irae
2019	Ball	"In The Army Now" by Captain Jack
2019	Clubs	"Flamenco" by Timmy Trumpet & Jetfire & Rage
2019	Ribbon	"It's a Man's World" by Luciano Pavarotti & James Brown
2018	Hoop	Light of the Seven by Srod Almenara feat. Alina Lesnik
2018	Ball	In The Army Now by Captain Jack
2018	Clubs	Festivo by Keiichi Suzuki
2018	Ribbon	Yovano, Yovanke by Slavi Trifonov And Ku-Ku Band
2017	Hoop	"Yozdole Ide, Petrunka" by Kaufmann Project
2017	Ball	"Paco de Lucía Concierto Aranjuez - Adagio" by Paco de Lucia
2017	Clubs	"Mixed - Ouverture, Nostalic, Extreme, Delirium" by Les Tambours du Bronx
2017	Ribbon	"Buleria" by David Bisbal
2016	Hoop	"Schindler's List" by John Williams
2016	Ball	"Tanguera" by Sexteto Mayor
2016	Clubs	"Mixed - Ouverture, Nostalic, Extreme, Delirium" by Les Tambours du Bronx
2016	Ribbon	"Buleria" by David Bisbal
2015	Hoop	"Guerrilleros" by Maxime Rodriguez
2015	Ball	"Eniovden" by Desi Dobreva, Zvezdomir Keremidchiev
2015	Clubs	"Played Alive" by Safri Duo
2015	Ribbon	"Gipsy House" by Boban & Marko Markovic Orchestra
2014	Hoop	"Guerrilleros" by Maxime Rodriguez
2014	Ball	
2014	Clubs	African samba
2014	Ribbon	"Bre Petrunko" by Banda DelPadre
2013	Hoop	"Guerrilleros" by Maxime Rodriguez
2013	Ball	"Queremos Paz" by Gotan Project
2013	Clubs	"Samba Vocalizado" by Luciano Perrone
2013	Ribbon	

== Competitive highlights ==
(Team competitions in seniors are held only at the World Championships, Europeans and other Continental Games.)

International: Senior
Year	Event	AA	Team	Hoop	Ball	Clubs	Ribbon
2019
2019	Grand Prix Brno	4th				4th	6th
2019	Grand Prix Holon	9th			4th	6th	3rd
2019	European Championships		3rd	4th		14th (Q)	
2019	World Cup Tashkent	5th		5th	5th	2nd	5th
2019	World Cup Sofia	8th		4th	6th		
2019	International Tournament Lisbon	1st		2nd	1st	1st	1st
2018
2018	World Championships	15th	2nd		7th	6th	
2018	World Cup Minsk	8th		5th		4th	2nd
2018	World Cup Tashkent	6th			8th	6th	4th
2018	World Cup Pesaro	7th		8th	5th	7th	
2017
2017	Dalia Kutkaite Cup	4th					
2017	World Championships	7th		5th	3rd	4th	
2017	World Cup Kazan	5th		7th	7th	7th	
2017	World Cup Minsk	5th		1st	7th	2nd	3rd
2017	World Games			8th	5th	7th	4th
2017	European Championships		3rd	8th	4th	5th	3rd
2017	World Cup Sofia	1st		1st	1st	2nd	1st
2017	World Cup Baku	3rd		4th	3rd	4th	1st
2017	World Cup Pesaro	6th			6th		4th
2017	Grand Prix Marbella	4th		3rd	2nd	2nd	2nd
2017	Grand Prix Moscow	4th		4th	5th	7th	4th
2016
2016	Olympic Games	7th					
2016	World Cup Baku	6th					
2016	European Championships	10th					
2016	World Cup Guadalajara	9th					
2016	World Cup Sofia	6th		5th	6th		3rd
2016	World Cup Minsk	8th					
2016	World Cup Pesaro	9th					
2016	World Cup Lisboa	6th					
2016	Grand Prix Moscow	13th					
2014
2014	Grand Prix	3rd			3rd	2nd	2nd|
2014	World Championships	25th	7th	5th	3rd	4th	
2014	European Championships	13th					
2014	World Cup Sofia	9th		4th		6th	
2014	World Cup Pesaro	18th					
2014	Grand Prix Moscow			4th			
National
Year	Event	AA	Team	Hoop	Ball	Clubs	Ribbon
2019	Bulgarian Championships	3rd		2nd	3rd	5th	1st
2018	Bulgarian Championships	3rd		1st	4nd	2nd	3rd
2017	Bulgarian Championships	1st		1st	1st	2nd	3rd
Q = Qualifications (Did not advance to Event Final due to the 2 gymnast per country rule, only Top 8 highest score); WR = World Record; WD = Withdrew; NT = No Team Competition; OC = Out of Competition(competed but scores not counted for qualifications/results)
