= Aleksandra Soldatova =

Russian rhythmic gymnast (born 1998)

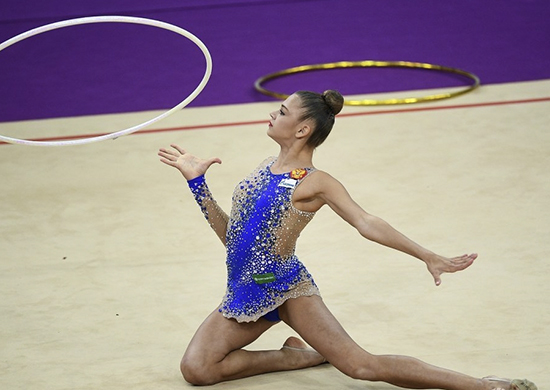
- Soldatova at the 2017 Grand Prix Moscow performing her hoop routine, in a middle of an element.

Personal information
- Full name: Aleksandra Sergeyevna Soldatova
- Alternative name: Alexandra Soldatova
- Nickname: Sasha
- Born: 1 June 1998 (age 28) Sterlitamak, Bashkortostan, Russia
- Height: 174 cm (5 ft 9 in)

Gymnastics career
- Discipline: Rhythmic gymnastics
- Country represented: Russia; (2012–2020)
- Club: Gazprom
- Gym: Novogorsk
- Head coach: Irina Viner
- Assistant coach: Anna Shumilova
- Choreographer: Lyudmila Dimitrova, Tatiiana Pomerantseva
- Retired: 24th of December 2020
- World ranking: 2 WC (2019); 3 WC 1 WCC (2018); 2 WC 9 WCC (2017); 3 (2016); 3 (2015); 8 (2014)
Medal record
Representing Russia
Rhythmic Gymnastics
World Championships
Gold medal – first place	2014 Izmir	Team
Gold medal – first place	2015 Stuttgart	Team
Gold medal – first place	2018 Sofia	Team
Gold medal – first place	2018 Sofia	Ribbon
Silver medal – second place	2015 Stuttgart	Clubs
Silver medal – second place	2015 Stuttgart	Hoop
Silver medal – second place	2018 Sofia	Ball
Bronze medal – third place	2018 Sofia	All-Around
European Championships
Gold medal – first place	2015 Minsk	Team
Gold medal – first place	2017 Budapest	Team
Gold medal – first place	2019 Baku	Team
Silver medal – second place	2017 Budapest	Hoop
Silver medal – second place	2017 Budapest	Ball
Silver medal – second place	2019 Baku	Ball
Silver medal – second place	2019 Baku	Ribbon
Grand Prix Final
Gold medal – first place	2016 Eilat	All-around
Gold medal – first place	2016 Eilat	Hoop
Gold medal – first place	2016 Eilat	Ball
Gold medal – first place	2016 Eilat	Clubs
Gold medal – first place	2016 Eilat	Ribbon
Junior European Championships
Gold medal – first place	2012 Nizhy Novgorod	Ribbon
Gold medal – first place	2012 Nizhy Novgorod	Team

Aleksandra Sergeyevna Soldatova (Russian: Александра Сергеевна Солдатова; born 1 June 1998) is a retired Russian individual rhythmic gymnast. She is the 2018 World All-around bronze medalist, 2018 World ribbon champion, the 2016 Grand Prix Final All-around champion and the 2016 Russian National All-around champion. On the junior level, she is the 2012 European Junior ribbon champion and two-time Russian Junior National All-around medalist.

She was coached by Anna Shumilova-Dyachenko. On 24 December 2020, Soldatova announced that she had retired from competitive gymnastics.

== Career ==
=== Junior ===
Soldatova began training in rhythmic gymnastics at age five. She burst onto the junior international scene at the 2011 Junior Irina Deleanu Cup where she won gold medal in the all-around and event finals in hoop and ribbon, silver medal in ball. She then competed at the World Club Cup, the 2011 Aeon Cup in Tokyo, Japan, where she won the junior all-around gold together with Team Gazprom (seniors Evgenia Kanaeva and Daria Kondakova). At the Russian National Junior Championships, she won the bronze in 2012 and silver in 2013 in the all-around.

In 2012, Soldatova started her season at the 2012 Moscow Grand Prix. She won the all-around gold at the Schmiden International Tournament and all event finals before winning Team gold with Dina Averina and Arina Averina at the 2012 MTM Ljubljana. After winning gold in ribbon at the 2012 Pesaro Junior World Cup, she then won the all-around title at the 2012 Sofia Junior World Cup and the event finals. At the 2012 European Junior Championships, Soldatova won the gold medal in ribbon as well as helping the Russian junior team (with Yana Kudryavtseva, Julia Sinitsina and Diana Borisova) win the junior team gold medal.

Competing at the 2013 Russian Spartakiada's 6th Summer Student Games, Soldatova won the all-around gold ahead of the Averina twins, as well as gold in ribbon and silver in clubs and hoop.

=== Senior ===
==== 2014 season ====
In the 2014 season, due to Russia's repository of rhythmic gymnasts, Soldatova was part of the reserve team, and nevertheless made her senior debut competing in the senior international tournament division at the 2014 Moscow Grand Prix where she won the bronze medal in the All-around behind the Averina Twins (Dina and Arina). Soldatova was assigned to her first World Cup event after replacing Yulia Sinitsina in the entry list for the 2014 Debrecen World Cup where Soldatova finished 1st place in the all-around with a total score of 70.750 points, beating 2013 World Silver medalist Ganna Rizatdinova for the gold. In event finals, she won gold in clubs (18.067) and ribbon (17.633), silver in ball (17.583) and bronze in hoop (17.283) points. In 4–6 April, Soldatova competed at the 2014 Baltic Hoop where she won the all-around gold medal, teammate Arina Averina took the silver medal and bronze to Belarusian Katsiaryna Halkina. She won 3 gold medals in event finals: (in hoop, clubs, ribbon) and finished 4th in ball. In 23–27 April, Soldatova made her senior national appearance at the 2014 Russian Championships where she won the all-around bronze medal behind Yana Kudryavtseva (gold) and Margarita Mamun (silver). In 9–11 May, Soldatova competed in her second World Cup at the 2014 Corbeil-Essonnes World Cup where she finished 4th in all-around behind Ganna Rizatdinova, she qualified to 1 event final winning the silver medal in ball. Soldatova then competed at the 2014 Tashkent World Cup winning bronze in the all-around behind teammates Margarita Mamun and Yana Kudryavtseva who took the gold and silver medal respectively, she did not advance to the event finals due to the 2 gymnast per country rule, with Mamun and Kudryavtseva placing ahead of her in qualifications. In 4–6 July, Soldatova competed at the Izmir Tournament Cup and won the all-around gold ahead of teammate Maria Titova, she qualified to all 4 event finals and won gold in ribbon, 3 silver medals (hoop, ball and clubs). In 16–17 August, Soldatova was invited for an international competition meet in Vitoria, Brazil where she made a sweep of the gold medals with high scores in the all-around (71.500 points) and all event finals (Hoop:18.150, Ball: 17.650, Clubs: 18.200, Ribbon: 18.000). In 22–28 September, Soldatova (along with teammates Yana Kudryavtseva and Margarita Mamun) represented Russia at the 2014 World Championships, she competed in only 2 apparatus, contributing scores of 17.675 (ball) and 18.050 (hoop) helping Russia win the Team gold medal with a total of 147.914 points.

==== 2015 season ====
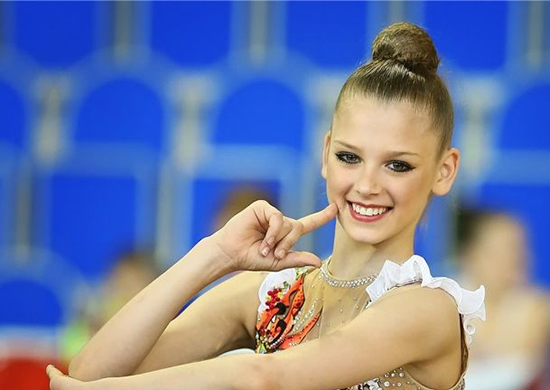
Soldatova in 2015

Soldatova started her season competing at the 2015 Moscow Grand Prix where she finished 4th in the all-around. She qualified to 2 event finals, taking the gold medal in ball ahead of Melitina Staniouta and finished 7th in clubs. In 27–29 March, Soldatova competed at the 2015 Lisboa World Cup where she won the all-around gold with a total score of 73.600 points beating compatriots Margarita Mamun (silver) and Yana Kudryavtseva (bronze). She qualified to 3 event finals: won gold in clubs, silver in ball and placed 6th in hoop. Her next event, at the 2015 Lisboa World Cup, Soldatova finished 6th in all-around after mistakes and drop from her hoop routine, she qualified to 2 apparatus finals winning gold in ribbon (tied with Kudryavtseva) and silver in clubs. In 10–12 April, Soldatova won the all-around bronze at the 2015 Pesaro World Cup, she qualified to 2 event finals taking gold in ball and bronze in ribbon. Soldatova was selected as member of the Russian team to compete at the 2015 European Championships where they won Team gold (together with teammates Kudryavtseva and Margarita Mamun). Soldatova qualified to 2 apparatus however only placed 7th in hoop and 8th in clubs finals. In 15–26 May, Soldatova competed at the 2015 Holon Grand Prix, she won silver in ball and ribbon finals. At the 2015 Tashkent World Cup, Soldatova won the all-around silver behind Margarita Mamun, she qualified to all 4 apparatus finals, taking silver (in hoop, ball, ribbon) and placed 6th in clubs. Soldatova's next competition was at the 2015 Grand Prix Berlin where she won bronze in all-around behind Melitina Staniouta, she qualified to 3 event finals and won silver in (hoop, clubs, ribbon). In August, Soldatova competed at the 2015 Budapest World Cup finishing 4th in all-around behind Belarusian Melitina Staniouta, Soldatova only qualified to 1 event final placing 7th in ribbon. In her next competition, Soldatova finished 6th in the all-around at the 2015 Sofia World Cup and qualified to 1 event final taking silver in clubs behind teammate Kudryavtseva. At the 2015 World Cup series in Kazan, Soldatova won the all-around bronze medal with a total of 74.300 points. Soldatova qualified to clubs final, but was given the remaining apparatus finals being the 3rd Russian qualifier in scores, after Kudryavtseva's withdrawal from an ankle inflammation sustained in her clubs routine. Soldatova competed in the events suffering from a flu, nevertheless, she only made a few mistakes and won silver medals in Hoop (18.500), Ball (18.450), Clubs (18.300) and Ribbon (18.400) right behind teammate Margarita Mamun who won all the apparatus finals. In 9–13 September, At the 2015 World Championships in Stuttgart, Soldatova (together with teammates Kudryavtseva and Mamun) represented Russia where they won the Team gold. She competed in 3 apparatus in qualifications and qualified to 2 finals, winning the silver medal in hoop and clubs, she was ranked 3rd for the all-around; however she did not advance into the all-around finals because of the two-per country rule and with Kudryavsteva and Mamun ahead of her in qualification scores. In 2–4 October, Soldatova together with teammates Margarita Mamun and junior Alina Ermolova represented Team Gazprom at the 2015 Aeon Cup in Tokyo, Japan, Soldatova won bronze in the individual all-around finals behind Ganna Rizatdinova and with Team Russia winning the gold medal in the overall standings.

==== 2016 season ====
In 2016, Soldatova started her season at the 2016 Moscow Grand Prix where she won the all-around gold medal with a total of 74.066 points, she qualified to 3 apparatus finals taking gold in hoop, ball and a silver in ribbon. In 26–28 February, Soldatova competed in the first World Cup of the season at the 2016 Espoo World Cup where she won the all-around gold. In apparatus finals; she won gold in clubs, silver in hoop, bronze in ribbon, placed 4th in ball. On 17–20 March, Soldatova then competed at the 2016 Lisboa World Cup where she won the all-around gold with a total of 75.650 points (a new Personal Best). In event finals, she won gold in hoop, ball, silver in ribbon (tied with teammate Arina Averina) and bronze in clubs. At the 30th Thiais Grand Prix event in Paris, Soldatova won the all-around silver behind teammate Margarita Mamun, she qualified 3 apparatus finals: taking gold in ball, ribbon and silver in hoop. Soldatova won the all-around gold at the 2016 Russian Championships held in Sochi. On 13–15 May, Soldatova competed at the 2016 Tashkent World Cup where she won the all-around silver medal behind Yana Kudryavtseva, she qualified to 3 apparatus finals taking silver in hoop, clubs and ribbon. She won another silver medal in the all-around at the 2016 Minsk World Cup with a total of 74.200 points, in the event finals: she won 3 silver medals (ball, ribbon, clubs) and placed 7th in hoop. On 3–5 June, Soldatova then won silver in the all-around at the 2016 Guadalajara World Cup with a new PB score of 75.700 points, in apparatus finals: she won gold in ball, silver in hoop, clubs and bronze in ribbon. On 8–10 July, Soldatova won bronze in the all-around at the 2016 Kazan World Cup with a total of 75.500 points, she qualified to 1 apparatus final taking silver in clubs. On 22–24 July, culminating the World Cup of the season in 2016 Baku World Cup, Soldatova won another all-around bronze medal with a total of 75.850 points - updating her Personal Best, she qualified to 1 apparatus final; winning a silver in ball behind Margarita Mamun. Soldatova traveled as a reserve/alternate individual athlete in Russia's rhythmic gymnastics at the 2016 Summer Olympics held in Rio de Janeiro. On 9–11 September, Soldatova together with teammates Margarita Mamun and junior Maria Sergeeva represented team Gazprom at the annual 2016 Aeon Cup in Tokyo, where they won the team gold and with Soldatova taking bronze in individual all-around behind Ganna Rizatdinova.

==== 2017 season ====
In 2017, Soldatova started her Post-Olympics season in competition at the 2017 Grand Prix Moscow where she won the all-around silver medal behind teammate Dina Averina, she qualified 2 apparatus finals winning the gold in ball and silver in hoop. On 10–12 March, Soldatova competed as the defending champion at the 2017 Russian Championships where she won the all-around silver medal behind Dina. On 31 March – 2 April, Soldatova competed at the 2017 Grand Prix Marbella where she won the all-around gold and swept the gold in all the event finals in hoop (19.350), ball (19.250), clubs (19.500), and ribbon (19.200). On 7–9 April, Soldatova competed in the first World Cup of the season at the 2017 Pesaro World Cup where she won gold in the all-around ahead of teammate Dina Averina, she qualified to all the apparatus finals taking gold in hoop, silver medals in ball, ribbon and placed 5th in clubs. Her next event at the 2017 Baku World Cup, Soldatova won silver in the all-around behind Arina Averina, she qualified to all the apparatus finals taking gold in ball, silver medals in hoop, clubs and placed 5th in ribbon. On 19–21 May, at the 2017 European Championships in Budapest, Hungary, Soldatova was member of the Golden winning Russian Team (together with senior individuals Dina Averina, Arina Averina and the junior group) scoring a total of 182.175 points which was more than 11 points ahead of their nearest competitor team Belarus. Soldatova qualified to 3 apparatus finals taking 2 silver medals in hoop, ball and finished 4th in ribbon behind Neviana Vladinova. Recovering from an ankle injury; Soldatova returned to competition on 4–6 August at the 2017 Minsk World Challenge Cup, she won gold in the all-around, she qualified in all 4 apparatus finals however mistake ridden routines and imprecise elements, after taking a silver in hoop behind Neviana Vladinova, she finished 5th in ball, 6th in clubs, 4th in ribbon in her latter 3 apparatus. On 9 August, during the Russian team's control training selection process for the 2017 Summer Universiade, Soldatova was not selected to represent Russia in the rhythmic gymnastics universiade participants, the 2 representatives were Iuliia Bravikova and Ekaterina Selezneva. Irina Viner has also stated that Soldatova will not participate at the 2017 World Championships as she has not fully recovered from her injury, she is still heavily recovering not just physically, but mentally. On 5–6 November, Soldatova competed at the 2017 Dalia Kutkaite Cup winning the all-around gold with a total of 74.850 points, a 0.5 ahead of silver medalist Katsiaryna Halkina.

==== 2018 season ====
In 2018, Soldatova started the season at the 2018 Grand Prix Moscow, where she placed 4th in all-around. She qualified to two apparatus finals, where she won silver with clubs and ribbon.

On 30 March – 1 April, Soldatova began with the world cup events competing at the 2018 Sofia World Cup where she won the gold medal at the all-around. She qualified in all the apparatus finals, winning gold with hoop and ball, a bronze with clubs and finishing 4th with ribbon. On 20–22 April, at the 2018 Tashkent World Cup, Soldatova won gold in the all-around posting a new personal best total of 77.050 points. She swept all the gold medals in the apparatus finals with high scores in hoop(19.900), ball(19.600), clubs(18.000) and ribbon(18.300). On 4–6 May, Soldatova competed at the 2018 Guadalajara World Challenge Cup where she won silver in the all-around (72.750) behind Linoy Ashram. She qualified in all apparatus finals however mistakes with hoop and ball led to 6th and 7th place respectively in those finals.

On 16–17 May, Soldatova competed at the 2018 Holon Grand Prix and won silver in the all-around with a total of 75.750 points behind teammate Arina Averina. She qualified for the hoop and clubs finals. However she withdrew from the events schedule due to injury, and it was later revealed she sustained a fracture in her left leg.

==== 2019 season ====
Soldatova won four gold medals at the Tashkent World Cup in April 2019, and five gold medals at the 2019 Guadalajara World Challenge Cup in early May. On 19 May 2019, she won two silver medals - in ball and ribbon - at the European Championships in Baku. In September at the Portimão World Challenge Cup, Soldatova won the all-around gold.

==== 2020 season ====
Russian media reported that on 5 February Soldatova was taken to the Sklifosovskiy Institute in Moscow due to injuries on her left arm from a suicide attempt. At the hospital she was diagnosed with bulimia. Soldatova later stated through her coach's Instagram account that she had accidentally cut herself with a knife while making breakfast and gone to the hospital. In February 2020, she revealed that she would take time off to receive treatment for bulimia, which she had been suffering from for the past two years, and wanted to begin training again once she became healthy.

Soldatova did not compete during the 2020 season, which was curtailed due to the coronavirus pandemic. She announced her retirement from gymnastics on 24 December 2020.

== Gymnastics technique ==
Soldatova was known for her flexible body difficulties and pivot turns, she has executed a quintuple penchee turn and a quadruple ring pivot in competitions.

== Routine music information ==
Year	Apparatus	Music title
2021	Gala (Grand Prix Moscow opening)	"The Promise", by Secret Garden
2021	Gala (Grand Prix Moscow closing)	"I Like the Way You're Not Ill With Me" (Russian: Мне нравится, что Вы больны не мной), by Alla Pugacheva, lyrics by Marina Tsvetaeva
2020	Gala	"Mama", by Dalida
2019	Hoop	The Gypsies; Journey Across Europe / Fanatico Master music from Oxford / KOi by John Corigliano / Edvin Marton & Ari Zakaryan
2019	Ball	"The Love of the Tired Swans" (Russian: Любовь уставших лебедей), by Dimash Kudaibergen, composed by Igor Krutoy
2019	Clubs	"Always", by AySel feat. Arash
2019	Ribbon	"Scheherazade", by Nikolai Rimsky-Korsakov
2019	Gala	"The Love of the Tired Swans" (Russian: Любовь уставших лебедей), by Dimash Kudaibergen, composed by Igor Krutoy
2018	Hoop (first)	"Granada" by Stanley Black
2018	Hoop (second)	"Malagueña", by Stanley Black
2018	Ball (first)	"Carmen Suite", by Moscow Virtuosi Chamber Orchestra, composed by Georges Bizet
2018	Ball (second)	"Don Quixote", by Ludwig Minkus
2018	Clubs (first)	"Eyes Like Yours", by Shakira
2018	Clubs (second)	"The Second Waltz", by Dmitri Shostakovich
2018	Ribbon	"You Don't Give Up On Love" (Russian: Не отрекаются любя), by Alla Pugacheva, composed by Mark Minkov
2018	Gala (first)	"Blizzard", by Quatro
2018	Gala (second)	"Por Fin", by Pablo Alborán
2017	Hoop	"Prelude in C-sharp minor", by Pierre-Yves Plat, composed by Sergei Rachmaninoff
2017	Ball (first)	"The Dying Swan", music from The Carnival of the Animals by Camille Saint-Saëns
2017	Ball (second)	"Aria", by Giorgia Fumanti, from The Carnival of the Animals by Camille Saint-Saëns
2017	Clubs (fist)	"Girl's Dance" from The Path of Thunder, by Gara Garayev
2017	Clubs (second)	"Russian Dance" from Swan Lake, Act III, Op. 20, by Pyotr Ilyich Tchaikovsky
2017	Ribbon	"Spartacus" (The Triumph of Rome, Adagio of Spartacus and Phrygia, Spartacus' Death), by Aram Khachaturian
2017	Gala	"Russian Dance" from Swan Lake, Act III, Op. 20, by Pyotr Ilyich Tchaikovsky
2016	Hoop	"Phantasia" from The Phantom of the Opera, by Sarah Chang, Julian Lloyd Webber
2016	Ball	"Mama", by Dalida
2016	Clubs	"Kadril Veselaya" (Russian: Весёлая кадриль), by Kravtet Sisters and Anna Litvinenko
2016	Ribbon	"Piano Concerto no. 1 in B flat minor, op. 23" by Maksim Mrvica, composed by Pyotr Ilyich Tchaikovsky
2016	Gala	"Fantasie-tableaux Op. 5 Barcarolle", by Sergei Rachmaninoff
2015	Hoop (first)	"Concerto in F", by George Gershwin
2015	Hoop (second)	"Danse de Phryne" from Faust, by Charles Gounod
2015	Ball	"Swan Lake" by David Garrett, composed by Pyotr Ilyich Tchaikovsky
2015	Clubs	"Straight To Memphis", by Club des Belugas
2015	Ribbon	"Polovtsian Dances" (Russian: Половецкие пляски), by Alexandr Borodin
2015	Gala	"Worth It", by Fifth Harmony feat. Kid Ink
2014	Hoop	"Mazurka" from Masquerade, by Aram Khachaturian
2014	Ball	"La donna è mobile", by Luciano Pavarotti, composed by Giuseppe Verdi
2014	Clubs	"My Fair Lady", by Frederick Loewe
2014	Ribbon	"Dillo Ancora", by Carmelo Zappulla
2014	Gala	"Goodbye" from Hachi: A Dog's Tale, by Jan A. P. Kaczmarek
2013	Hoop	"La Gorda", by Roberto Polisano
2013	Ball	"Casta Diva", by Filippa Giordano
2013	Clubs	"Que Bonita Eres", by Latino Tres
2013	Ribbon	"Dillo Ancora", by Carmelo Zappulla
2012	Hoop	"Tango Cumparsita", by Bulevard Tango Club
2012	Ball	"Schedrivochka" (Russian: Щедривочка), by Pelageya
2012	Clubs	—
2012	Ribbon	"La Maritza", by Sylvie Vartan
2011	Hoop	"Cheburashka's Song" (Russian: Песня Чебурашки), by Vladimir Shainsky (arranged)
2011	Ball	"Badinerie", by Johann Sebastian Bach (arranged)
2011	Clubs	"Sole Love", by Nachum Heiman
2011	Ribbon	"On the Boat" (Russian: На катере), by Eugen Doga

== Competitive highlights ==
(Team competitions in seniors are held only at the World Championships, Europeans and other Continental Games.)

International: Senior
Year	Event	AA	Team	Hoop	Ball	Clubs	Ribbon
2019	World Cup Portimão	1st		8th	3rd	WD	WD
2019	European Championships		1st		2nd		2nd
2019	World Cup Guadalajara	1st		1st	1st	1st	1st
2019	World Cup Tashkent	1st		1st	1st	1st	4th
2019	World Cup Sofia	1st		3rd	4th	3rd	1st
2019	Grand Prix Marbella	2nd		4th	4th (Q)	4th (Q)	3rd
2019	Grand Prix Moscow	3rd		4th (Q)	9th (Q)	1st	3rd (Q)
2018	World Championships	3rd	1st	3rd (Q)	2nd		1st
2018	World Cup Kazan	1st		8th	3rd	3rd	3rd
2018	World Cup Minsk	2nd		2nd	5th	2nd	1st
2018	Grand Prix Holon	2nd		WD	3rd (Q)	WD	WD
2018	World Cup Guadalajara	2nd		6th	7th	2nd	1st
2018	World Cup Tashkent	1st		1st	1st	1st	1st
2018	World Cup Sofia	1st		1st	1st	3rd	4th
2018	Grand Prix Moscow	4th		5th (Q)	6th (Q)	2nd	2nd
2017	Dalia Kutkaite Cup	1st					
2017	Gracia Fair Cup	1st					
2017	World Cup Minsk	1st		2nd	5th	6th	4th
2017	European Championships		1st	2nd	2nd		4th
2017	World Cup Baku	2nd		2nd	1st	2nd	5th
2017	World Cup Pesaro	1st		1st	2nd	5th	2nd
2017	Grand Prix Marbella	1st		1st	1st	1st	1st
2017	Grand Prix Moscow	2nd		2nd	1st	3rd (Q)	4th (Q)
2016	Grand Prix Final: Eilat	1st		1st	1st	1st	1st
2016	Aeon Cup	3rd	1st				
2016	World Cup Baku	3rd		3rd (Q)	2nd	3rd (Q)	3rd (Q)
2016	Italia-Russia Match		1st				
2016	World Cup Kazan	3rd		3rd (Q)	3rd (Q)	2nd	3rd (Q)
2016	World Cup Guadalajara	2nd		2nd	1st	2nd	3rd
2016	World Cup Minsk	2nd		7th	2nd	2nd	2nd
2016	World Cup Tashkent	2nd		2nd	18th (Q)	2nd	2nd
2016	Grand Prix Thiais	2nd		2nd	1st	7th (Q)	1st
2016	World Cup Lisbon	1st		1st	1st	3rd	2nd
2016	World Cup Espoo	1st		2nd	5th	1st	3rd
2016	Grand Prix Moscow	1st		1st	1st	6th (Q)	2nd
2015	Grand Prix Final	WD					
2015	Aeon Cup	3rd	1st				
2015	World Championships	3rd (Q)	1st	2nd		2nd	5th (Q)
2015	World Cup Kazan	3rd		2nd	2nd	2nd	2nd
2015	World Cup Sofia	6th		6th (Q)	6th (Q)	2nd	7th (Q)
2015	World Cup Budapest	4th		4th (Q)	3rd (Q)	5th (Q)	7th
2015	Grand Prix Berlin	3rd		2nd	16th (Q)	2nd	2nd
2015	World Cup Tashkent	2nd		2nd	2nd	6th	2nd
2015	Grand Prix Holon	3rd		5th (Q)	2nd	3rd (Q)	2nd
2015	European Championships		1st	7th		8th	
2015	World Cup Pesaro	3rd		8th (Q)	1st	3rd (Q)	3rd
2015	World Cup Bucharest	6th		20th (Q)	4th (Q)	2nd	1st
2015	World Cup Lisbon	1st		6th	2nd	1st	4th (Q)
2015	Grand Prix Moscow	4th		13th (Q)	1st	7th	4th (Q)
2014	Italian Serie A		1st				
2014	World Championships		1st	4th (Q)	4th (Q)		
2014	IV International Brazil Meet	1st		1st	1st	1st	1st
2014	Izmir Tournament Cup	1st		2nd	2nd	2nd	1st
2014	Tashkent World Cup	3rd		4th (Q)	4th (Q)	3rd (Q)	3rd (Q)
2014	Corbeil-Essonnes World Cup	4th		4th (Q)	2nd	12th (Q)	3rd (Q)
2014	Baltic Hoop	1st		1st	4th	1st	1st
2014	Debrecen World Cup	1st		3rd	2nd	1st	1st
2014	Gazprom International Tournament	3rd					
International: Junior
Year	Event	AA	Team	Hoop	Ball	Clubs	Ribbon
2013	Italian Serie A	1st					
2012	European Championships		1st				1st
2012	Penza World Cup		1st				1st
2012	Tashkent World Cup		1st				1st
2012	Sofia World Cup	1st		1st	1st	1st	1st
2012	Pesaro World Cup		1st				1st
2012	MTM Ljubljana		1st				
2012	Schmiden International	1st		1st	1st	1st	1st
2011	Aeon Cup	1st	1st				
2011	Irina Deleanu Cup	1st		1st	2nd	1st	1st
National
Year	Event	AA	Team	Hoop	Ball	Clubs	Ribbon
2019	Russian Championships	9th	1st				
2018	Russian Championships	2nd	1st				
2017	Russian Championships	2nd	3rd	1st	5th	2nd	2nd
2016	Russian Championships	1st	3rd	4th	10th	2nd	3rd
2014	Russian Championships	3rd		1st	2nd	6th	2nd
2013	Russian Junior Championships	2nd					
2012	Russian Junior Championships	3rd					
2011	Russian Junior Championships	8th					
Q = Qualifications (Did not advance to Event Final due to the 2 gymnast per country rule, only Top 8 highest score); WD = Withdrew; NT = No Team Competition
