= Les Tambours du Bronx =

French percussion band

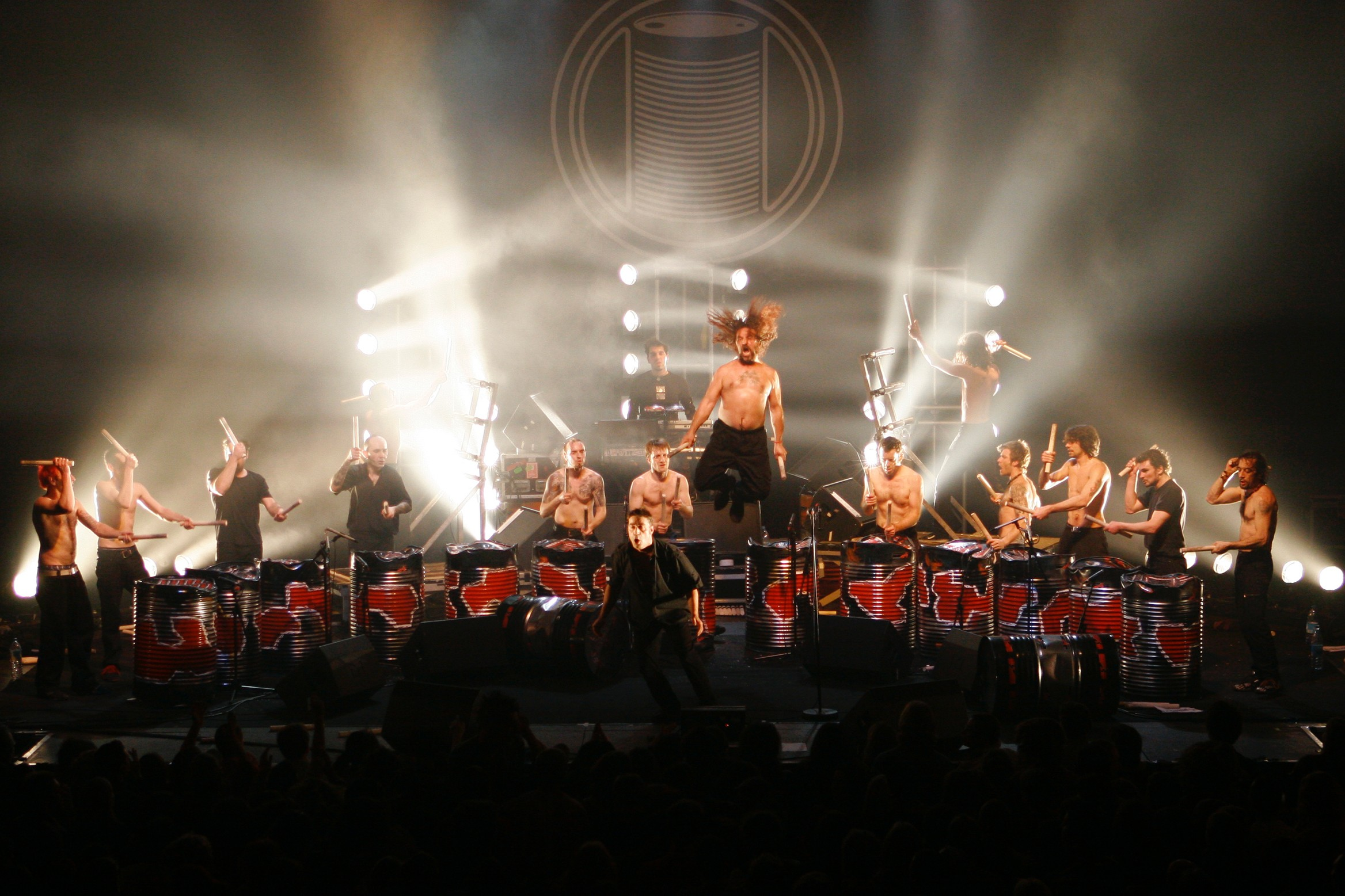
The band performing in 2005

Les Tambours du Bronx (French pronunciation: [le tɑ̃buʁ dy bʁɔ̃ks], lit. 'The Drums from The Bronx') are a French industrial percussion band, formed in 1987.

Les Tambours du Bronx stage show features 18 musicians surrounded by synthetic sounds, samples, and vocals, with heavy use of rhythm. The group play a percussion-focused combination of industrial music, afrobeat, drum and bass, hip hop, rock, metal, hardcore and techno.

== History ==
Les Tambours du Bronx formed in 1987 in Varennes-Vauzelles, a suburb of Nevers, Nièvre, France. Their name is taken from a Varennes-Vauzelles district named "The Bronx" because of its square-patterned streets and rows of identical dark houses. At the time, the district was inhabited by workers from SNCF, where the first drums used by the band were from.

The band's first performance was intended as a one-off event as part of the Nevers a Vif festival in 1987. In 1992, under the direction of Philippe Poustis, the band recorded an album, Grand Mix, with a philharmonic orchestra and Bulgarian voice choir. In 2008, they worked with Jaz Coleman of Killing Joke on three tracks, yet unreleased.

The band has performed in the United States, Brazil, the Middle East, Morocco, Tunisia, Greece, Reunion Island, Djibouti, Slovenia and across western Europe, and at events including the bicentenary of the French Revolution on the Champs-Élysées in 1989, Johnny Hallyday's 40-year anniversary concert under the Eiffel Tower, a six-week tour of the United States in 2000, the Sziget Festival in Budapest in 2005, and the Roskilde Festival in Denmark in 1992 and 1995. The band have performed more than 1,100 concerts and has included over 120 different musicians, all of them from Nevers and the surrounding area. Only a few musicians from the band's formation are still in the line-up.

The band's records are self-produced, via Sarl Tambours du Bronx Productions. They are distributed by the independent French label Naïve Records, who released their first DVD in March 2006. In October 2009, they released a studio album, MMIX, based on a live show. This record was distributed by the French independent label At(h)ome. In 2012 Les Tambours du Bronx appeared at Rock In Rio and Wacken Open Air festivals.

== Equipment ==
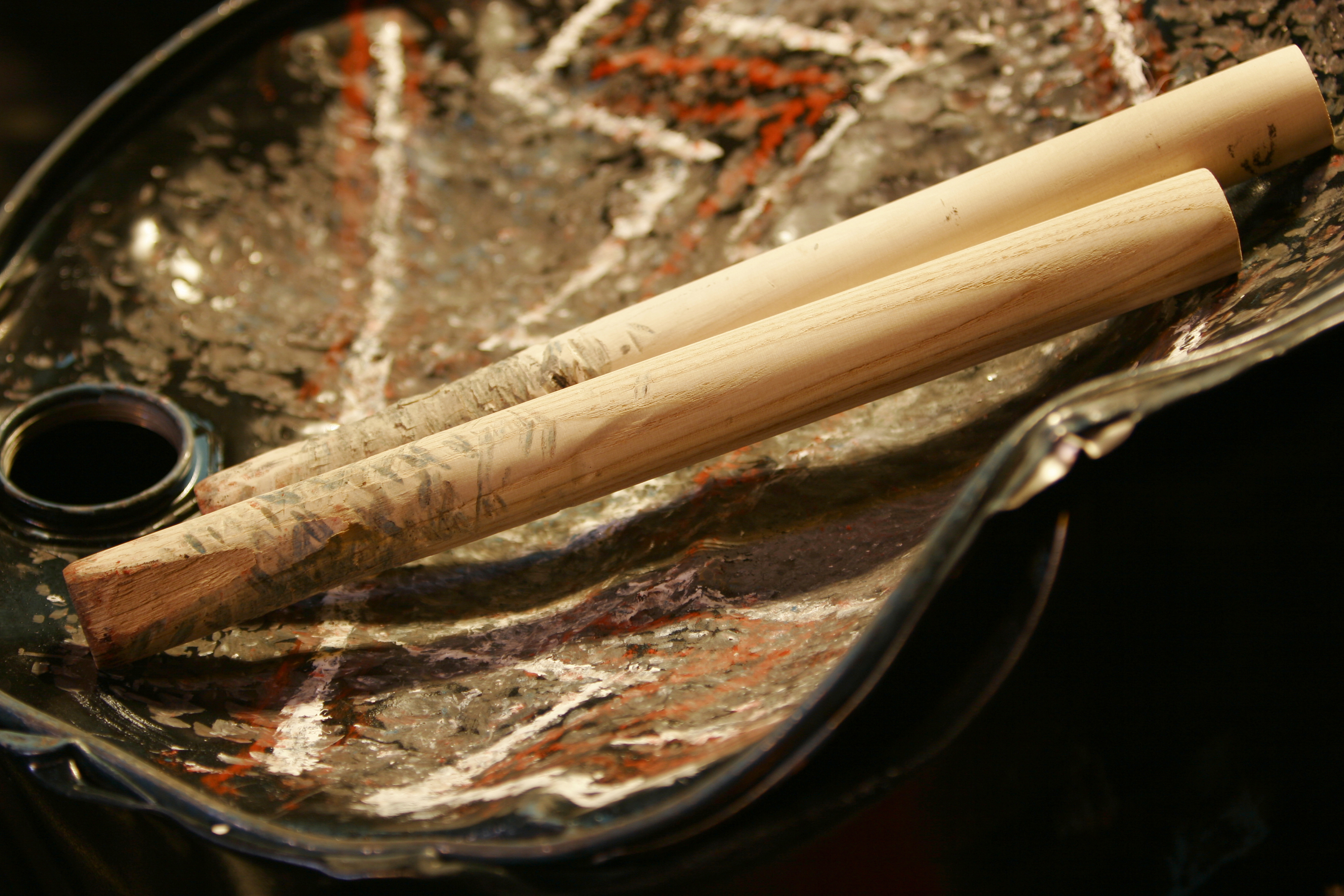

The drummers have used 225 litre "Monostress" drums since the band's inception, chosen for their resonance and flexibility. The drums arrive by truck, then are painted by band members using their own designs. Each drum is used for two concerts, one for each end, before being given away. Their sticks are made of beech wood and are 40 cm (16") long with a diameter of 3 cm (1.2"). Each musician breaks about two pairs per concert. In the band's lifetime, they have used about 16,000 oil drums and 110,000 sticks.

There are 14 drums on stage, two musicians on sampling stands, and one playing keyboards. One singer, or even two, perform a few songs. The drums circle arc is divided into three parts called "bases", "middles" and "rhythmics".

The electronic sounds, set off by the metal pipe stands, were introduced in the mid-1990s. The keyboards were added in 2003, with the album Stereostress Remixes. This allowed the band to explore other musical styles alongside their industrial roots. Until then, the concerts were acoustic only, with up to 28 musicians on stage. The present set still retains pieces with only drums. The band still occasionally plays 20-minute acoustic shows, instead of the complete 90 minute sets.

Since the new show launched in February 2009, the metal tubes have been also used to trigger real time video in addition to the sounds.

== Discography ==
=== Studio albums ===
- Ça sonne pas beau un bidon? (1989)
- Monostress 225L (1992)
- Grandmix (1993)
- Silence (1999)
- Stereostress Remixes (2003)
- MMIX (2009)
- CORROS (2015)
- W.O.M.P. (2018)
- EVILUTION (2023)

=== Extended Plays ===
- Vol.1: Lost & Found (2024)
- The Wild Pack (2025)
- We Need Godz (2025)

=== Live albums ===
- Live (2001)
- DVD Live (2006)
- BRONX Live (2006)
- Fukushima Mon Amour (2011)
- Metal Veins: Alive at Rock in Rio (2014) (with Sepultura)

=== Guest appearances ===
- Sepultura - Kairos (2011) - percussion on "Structure Violence (Azzes)"
