= Elizaveta Lugovskikh =

Russian rhythmic gymnast (born 2000)

- Full name: Elizaveta Aleksandrovna Lugovskikh
- Nicknames: Liza, ELIZA
- Born: 26 May 2000 (age 26) Voronezh, Russia

Gymnastics career
- Discipline: Rhythmic gymnastics
- Country represented: Montenegro (Russia 2017—2019; Montenegro 2022—2024)
- Former countries represented: Russia
- Club: Gimnasticki Klub Budva
- Gym: Novogorsk
- Head coaches: Vesna Radonić, Irina Viner
- Former coaches: Irina Viner, Tatiana Vasileva, Olga Stebeneva, Tatiana Safonova, Veronika Soshnina
- Choreographer: Irina Zemzova, Mikhail Pervykh, Tatyana Pomerantseva
- Retired: 2024

Elizaveta Aleksandrovna Lugovskikh (Russian: Елизавета Александровна Луговских; born 26 May 2000) is a Russian-Montenegrin individual rhythmic gymnast who represented Montenegro at international competitions.

== Personal life ==
Elizaveta currently lives in Singapore, where she works as a coach.

== Gymnastics career ==
In 2015, she participated in the N.D. Lifirenko memorial KMS tournament and took first place.

Lugovskikh debuted in the senior international scene at the 2017 Moscow Senior International tournament. She finished 17th in the all-around at the 2017 Russian Championships, and she took second place in the team competition. On 31 March – 2 April, Lugovskikh won silver in the all-around at the 2017 Irina Deleanu Cup. She then competed at tournament the "2017 Citta di Pesaro" where she won the all-around gold medal, she also qualified 2 apparatus finals taking gold in ribbon and ball. On 12–14 May, Lugovskikh competed in her first World Challenge Cup at the 2017 Portimao World Cup where she won silver in the all-around behind teammate Iuliia Bravikova, she qualified to all the apparatus finals taking gold in clubs, silver in ball, bronze in hoop and 4th in ribbon. On 23–25 June, Lugovskikh competed at the International Tournament of Holon finishing 5th in the all-around behind Mariya Trubach.

During the 2018 Russian Championships in Sochi, Elizaveta Lugovskikh won second place in the final of the ribbon exercise. At the same Championship, she took second place in the team competition.

She participated in the 2019 Happy Cup international tournament and won first place in the all-around and hoop, as well as second place in the ball and clubs.

=== Moving to Montenegro ===
After the disappointing results at the 2021 Russian Championships (25th in All-around), Liza competed at multiple tournaments in Montenegro, competing for Budva Club. She eventually moved to Montenegro.

Won first place at the FIG International tournament San Marino Cup 2022 in San Marino.

On 22 July 2022, International Gymnastics Federation confirmed her change of nationality and allowed her to compete at official events under Montenegro flag.

She won 5 gold medals at the 3rd FIG International tournament Montenegro Wild Beauty Cup 2023 in Budva.

In the 2023 Balkan Athletics Championships, she took 3rd place in the final of the hoop, ball and clubs exercise.

She represented Montenegro at the 2023 European Championships in Baku, Azerbaijan and placed 54th in All-around Qualifications. Later that year, she competed at the 2023 World Championships in Valencia, Spain, her first one. She finished on 60th place in All-around Qualifications.

She became a ten-time champion of Montenegro.

The last performance in Lugovskikh's sports career took place in March 2024 at the international Grand Prix 2024 Moscow, where she was injured during her performance. After that, Lugovskikh announced her retirement from gymnastics in August 2024.

== Musical career ==
After completing her sports career, she began singing and songwriting.

Under the nickname «ELIZA», on August 8, 2024, the first premiere of the track «Memories» took place on all major music venues, and later a music video for this song was published.

In an interview, Elizaveta Lugovskikh stated that she initially combined sports with studying at a music school. At the age of 12, she graduated from a music school with a master's degree in folklore singing.

The singer herself notes that her tracks «Memories» and «Spread Your Wings» were inspired by her sports career.

== See also ==
- Nationality changes in gymnastics
