= 2017 Rhythmic Gymnastics European Championships =

- Venue: László Papp Budapest Sports Arena
- Location: Budapest, Hungary
- Start date: 19 May 2017
- End date: 21 May 2017

The 2017 Rhythmic Gymnastics European Championships was the 33rd edition of the Rhythmic Gymnastics European Championships, which took place on 19–21 May 2017 at the László Papp Budapest Sports Arena. in Budapest, Hungary.

== Participating countries ==
- Andorra
- Armenia
- Austria
- Azerbaijan
- Belarus
- Bulgaria
- Croatia
- Cyprus
- Czech Republic
- Denmark
- Estonia
- France
- Finland
- Georgia
- Germany
- Greece
- Hungary
- Israel
- Italy
- Latvia
- Lithuania
- Moldova
- Netherlands
- Norway
- Poland
- Portugal
- Romania
- Russia
- Slovenia
- Serbia
- Spain
- Switzerland
- Slovakia
- Sweden
- Turkey
- Ukraine
- Great Britain

== Competition schedule ==
- Friday May 19
  - 10:00-12:00 CI junior groups 1st presentation
  - 13:00-15:00 CI seniors individual hoop and ball Group A
  - 15:15-17:15 CI seniors individual hoop and ball Group B
  - 18:30-20:15 CI seniors individual hoop and ball Group C
- Saturday May 20
  - 11:00-12:10 CII junior groups and senior individual round I
  - 12:20-13:40 CII junior groups and senior individual round II
  - 13:50-15:10 CII junior groups and senior individual round III
  - 15:20-16:40 CII junior groups and senior individual round IV
  - 17:00-18:00 CII junior groups and senior individual round V
  - 18:10-19:10 CII junior groups and senior individual round VI
  - 19:20-20:20 CII junior groups and senior individual round VII
- Sunday May 21
  - 11:00-11:45 CIII Apparatus finals junior groups
  - 12:20-13:10 CIII Apparatus finals seniors hoop and ball
  - 13:15-14:05 CIII Apparatus finals seniors clubs and ribbon

== Medal winners ==
Event	Gold	Silver	Bronze
Team
Team	Russia; Senior Individual; Dina Averina; Arina Averina; Aleksandra Soldatova; Junior Group; Diana Menzhinskaya; Olga Sadomskaia; Elizaveta Bogatckova; Kristina Telianikova; Ksenia Markova; Daria Perevozchikova	Belarus; Senior Individual; Katsiaryna Halkina; Alina Harnasko; Junior Group; Veranika Bialiayeva; Nastassiya Makutsevich; Daryia Yuruts; Dziyana Misiuchenka; Hanna Kalina; Kseniya Yaromenka	Bulgaria; Senior Individual; Neviana Vladinova; Katrin Taseva; Junior Group; Maria Spasova; Galateya Gerova; Boyana Gelova; Bilyana Pisova; Bilyana Vezirska
Senior Individual Finals
Hoop	Dina Averina; Russia	Aleksandra Soldatova; Russia	Linoy Ashram; Israel
Ball	Arina Averina; Russia	Aleksandra Soldatova; Russia	Alina Harnasko; Belarus
Clubs	Arina Averina; Russia	Dina Averina; Russia	Linoy Ashram; Israel
Ribbon	Dina Averina; Russia	Katrin Taseva; Bulgaria	Neviana Vladinova; Bulgaria
Junior Group Final
10 Clubs	Russia; Diana Menzhinskaya; Olga Sadomskaia; Elizaveta Bogatckova; Kristina Telianikova; Ksenia Markova; Daria Perevozchikova	Italy; Anna Paola Cantatore; Nina Corradini; Melissa Girelli; Francesca Pellegrini; Talisa Torretti; Rebecca Vinti	Israel; Yana Kramarenko; Shani Kataev; Michelle Segal; Yuliana Telegina; Lizi El-Ad; Shai Ben Ruby

== Results ==
=== Team ===
Rank	Nation	Hoop (rhythmic gymnastics)	Ball (rhythmic gymnastics)	Clubs (rhythmic gymnastics)	Ribbon (rhythmic gymnastics)	10	10	Total
1st place, gold medalist(s)	Russia	36.225	37.600	38.625	35.525	17.000	17.200	182.175
2nd place, silver medalist(s)	Belarus	35.050	35.650	34.950	32.900	16.200	16.700	171.450
3rd place, bronze medalist(s)	Bulgaria	34.100	34.500	35.200	34.350	15.700	16.450	170.300
4	Israel	34.700	33.650	34.300	32.000	16.350	16.700	167.700
5	Italy	32.150	33.175	29.750	32.150	16.100	16.500	159.825
6	Ukraine	31.950	31.650	32.050	28.050	16.000	16.400	156.100
7	Azerbaijan	32.850	31.450	30.300	27.750	15.150	15.000	152.500
8	Hungary	30.750	30.700	33.000	27.700	14.150	15.750	152.050
9	Estonia	29.850	28.800	29.800	29.250	14.900	15.550	148.150
10	Greece	30.600	30.200	31.350	28.200	13.200	13.100	146.650
11	Finland	29.750	29.450	29.500	28.450	13.400	15.350	145.900
12	Spain	31.550	29.050	29.750	26.700	13.350	13.900	144.300
13	Poland	27.800	27.100	29.550	25.350	14.650	15.100	139.550
14	Georgia	31.150	29.900	29.750	26.100	10.250	11.600	138.750
15	Austria	25.950	27.350	28.700	26.500	14.100	14.050	136.650
16	Latvia	27.300	27.050	27.100	24.750	13.250	15.100	134.550
17	Turkey	26.600	27.400	28.600	24.600	13.450	13.850	134.500
18	Germany	26.450	23.850	26.950	25.500	14.200	14.900	131.850
19	Slovakia	22.450	27.850	25.350	24.750	14.200	14.850	129.450
20	Lithuania	26.950	24.050	24.400	22.600	14.700	15.500	128.200
21	Slovenia	24.050	26.000	26.000	24.900	12.800	13.850	127.600
22	Norway	25.350	25.950	26.000	23.950	12.500	11.550	125.300
23	Czech Republic	26.100	22.350	24.650	22.250	14.600	13.100	123.050
24	Serbia	27.050	25.050	22.550	20.225	8.450	11.450	114.775
25	Andorra	21.550	18.850	18.550	17.750	10.200	11.450	98.350

=== Senior Individual ===
==== Hoop ====
Rank	Gymnast	Nation	D Score	E Score	Pen.	Total
1st place, gold medalist(s)	Dina Averina	Russia	9.2	9.000		18.200
2nd place, silver medalist(s)	Aleksandra Soldatova	Russia	8.9	9.250		18.150
3rd place, bronze medalist(s)	Linoy Ashram	Israel	9.3	8.675		17.975
4	Katrin Taseva	Bulgaria	8.9	8.550		17.450
5	Katsiaryna Halkina	Belarus	8.5	8.300		16.800
6	Marina Durunda	Azerbaijan	8.3	8.150		16.450
7	Alina Harnasko	Belarus	8.2	7.925		16.125
8	Neviana Vladinova	Bulgaria	7.9	8.150		16.050

==== Ball ====
Rank	Gymnast	Nation	D Score	E Score	Pen.	Total
1st place, gold medalist(s)	Arina Averina	Russia	9.6	9.250		18.850
2nd place, silver medalist(s)	Aleksandra Soldatova	Russia	8.7	9.425		18.125
3rd place, bronze medalist(s)	Alina Harnasko	Belarus	8.7	8.850		17.550
4	Neviana Vladinova	Bulgaria	7.9	8.900		16.800
5	Linoy Ashram	Israel	8.6	7.950	-0,300	16.250
6	Katsiaryna Halkina	Belarus	8.2	8.000		16.200
7	Viktoria Mazur	Ukraine	7.9	7.800		15.700
8	Alexandra Agiurgiuculese	Italy	7.7	7.400	-0,350	14.750

==== Clubs ====
Rank	Gymnast	Nation	D Score	E Score	Pen.	Total
1st place, gold medalist(s)	Arina Averina	Russia	9.9	9.175		19.075
2nd place, silver medalist(s)	Dina Averina	Russia	9.7	9.300		19.000
3rd place, bronze medalist(s)	Linoy Ashram	Israel	9.4	8.350		17.750
4	Alina Harnasko	Belarus	8.4	8.850		17.250
5	Neviana Vladinova	Bulgaria	8.2	8.700		16.900
6	Kseniya Moustafaeva	France	8.0	8.100		16.100
7	Viktoria Mazur	Ukraine	8.0	7.950		15.950
8	Eleni Kelaiditi	Greece	7.8	8.050		15.850

==== Ribbon ====
Rank	Gymnast	Nation	D Score	E Score	Pen.	Total
1st place, gold medalist(s)	Dina Averina	Russia	8.8	8.825		17.625
2nd place, silver medalist(s)	Katrin Taseva	Bulgaria	8.4	8.750		17.150
3rd place, bronze medalist(s)	Neviana Vladinova	Bulgaria	8.2	8.775		16.975
4	Aleksandra Soldatova	Russia	8.1	8.700		16.800
5	Alina Harnasko	Belarus	8.2	8.350		16.550
6	Linoy Ashram	Israel	7.4	8.650		16.050
7	Milena Baldassarri	Italy	7.5	8.300		15.800
8	Katsiaryna Halkina	Belarus	6.7	7.950		14.650

=== Junior Group ===
==== 10 Clubs ====
Rank	Nation	D Score	E Score	Pen.	Total
1st place, gold medalist(s)	Russia	8.0	8.950		16.950
2nd place, silver medalist(s)	Italy	8.0	8.700		16.700
3rd place, bronze medalist(s)	Israel	8.0	8.600		16.600
4	Belarus	8.0	8.300		16.300
5	Bulgaria	8.0	8.100		16.100
5	Lithuania	8.0	7.850		15.850
7	Estonia	8.0	7.250		15.250
8	Ukraine	8.0	7.200		15.200

== Medal count ==
Pos.	Country	Gold	Silver	Bronze	Total
1	Russia	6	3	0	9
2	Bulgaria	0	1	2	3
3	Belarus	0	1	1	2
4	Italy	0	1	0	1
5	Israel	0	0	3	3
Total		6	6	6	18
