= Katrin Taseva =

Bulgarian rhythmic gymnast (born 1997)

- Full name: Katrin Yankova Taseva
- Nicknames: Kati, Kate
- Born: November 24, 1997 (age 28) Samokov, Bulgaria
- Height: 164 cm (5 ft 5 in)

Gymnastics career
- Discipline: Rhythmic gymnastics
- Country represented: Bulgaria; (2010-2021)
- Club: Levski - Iliana
- Head coach: Branimira Markova
- Retired: yes
- World ranking: 2 WC 9 WCC (2017 Season); 20 (2016 Season)
Medal record
International Gymnastics Competitions
Event	1st	2nd	3rd
World Championships	0	1	0
European Championships	0	1	2
European Games	0	1	1
FIG World Cup	1	11	8
Grand Prix	2	5	5
Total	3	19	15
Representing Bulgaria
Rhythmic Gymnastics
World Championships
Silver medal – second place	2018 Sofia	Team
European Championships
Silver medal – second place	2017 Budapest	Ribbon
Bronze medal – third place	2017 Budapest	Team
Bronze medal – third place	2019 Baku	Team
European Games
Silver medal – second place	2019 Minsk	Ball
Bronze medal – third place	2019 Minsk	Ribbon
Grand Prix Final
Silver medal – second place	2019 Brno	Ball
Silver medal – second place	2019 Brno	Clubs
Bronze medal – third place	2019 Brno	All-Around
Bronze medal – third place	2019 Brno	Ribbon

Katrin Yankova Taseva (Bulgarian: Катрин Янкова Тасева; born November 24, 1997) is a retired Bulgarian individual rhythmic gymnast. She is the 2017 European Silver medalist with Ribbon, 2019 Grand-Prix Final All-around bronze medalist, the 2019 World Cup series All-around and Ball winner and the double (2018, 2019) World Cup series Ribbon winner. Taseva had won multiple medals at the European Games and is also the 2018 Bulgarian National Champion and a four-time (2016, 2017, 2019, 2020) Bulgarian National All-around silver medalist.

== Personal life ==
Taseva announced her engagement to her partner, Bulgarian pastry chef, Stanislav Sivkov, on her personal Instagram account in December 2022. Her first child, a son called Nikolay, was born in Plovdiv on 9 June 2023. She was previously engaged to Bulgarian wrestler, Nikolai Shterev, who died of COVID-19 in 2020. Taseva sold medals from previous world competitions to help raise money for his hospital care. Her son is named in Shterev's memory. After retiring from rhythmic gymnastics in 2021, she revealed that she gained ten kg. She previously struggled with an eating disorder as a gymnast and was vegetarian to maintain her weight. She resides in Asenovgrad and works as a rhythmic gymnastics coach for children, where she organizes master classes and training camps.

== Career ==
Taseva was born in Samokov. A member of the Bulgarian National team since 2010, she appeared in international junior competitions in 2008. Taseva began competing at the 2015 FIG Rhythmic Gymnastics World Cup Series in Bucharest, Romania and Budapest, Hungary.

=== 2016 season ===
In 2016, Taseva competed in several World Cup and Grand Prix Series. She had her highest placement finishing 9th in the all-around at the 2016 Baku World Cup. She then finished 13th in the all-around at the 2016 European Championships. She was unable to compete at the 2016 Rio Olympics as Bulgaria qualified only one individual rhythmic gymnast that went to Neviana Vladinova who earned her Olympic qualifications at the 2015 World Championships.

=== 2017 season ===
In 2017 Season, Taseva made her breakthrough at the 2017 Kyiv Grand Prix where she finished 4th in the all-around and won the gold medal in ball final. She then competed at the 2017 Marbella Grand Prix where she finished 6th in the all-around and qualified to 3 apparatus final. At the 2017 Pesaro World Cup, Taseva finished 5th in the all-around ahead of teammate Neviana Vladinova. She also qualified to all the event finals finishing 4th in hoop, 5th in ball, 6th in ribbon and 8th in clubs. The following week, at the 2017 Tashkent World Cup, Taseva made her World Cup breakthrough, where she won her first all-around medal, a bronze, and in addition, a silver with clubs and a bronze with ball. At the 2017 Sofia World Cup, Taseva won another all-around medal, a silver, behind teammate Neviana Vladinova. In the finals, she also won a bronze with ribbon. At the 2017 European Championships, Taseva, along with Vladinova and the Bulgarian junior group (Maria Spasova, Bilyana Vezirska, Bilyana Pisova, Boyana Gelova and Galateya Gerova) won the team all-around bronze medal, behind Russia and Belarus. In the finals she also won a silver with ribbon and placed fourth with hoop. On August 5–7, Taseva finished 6th in the all-around behind teammate Neviana Vladinova at the 2017 Minsk World Challenge Cup, she qualified in 3 apparatus finals and won finished 6th in ball, 5th in both ribbon, and clubs. On August 11–13, Taseva again finished 6th in the all-around behind Vladinova at the 2017 Kazan World Challenge Cup, she qualified in 3 apparatus finals and finished 6th in ball, 5th in clubs, ribbon. On August 30 - September 3, Taseva and Neviana Vladinova represented in the individual competitions for Bulgaria at the 2017 World Championships in Pesaro, Italy; she placed 8th in qualifications and finished 10th in the all-around final. On November 5–6, Taseva competed at the 2017 Dalia Kutkaite Cup finishing 5th in the all-around.

=== 2018 season ===
In 2018 season, due to Vladinova's injury; Taseva became Bulgaria's leading rhythmic gymnast. She began her season at Baltic Hoop International Rhythmic Gymnastics Tournament in Riga, Latvia, finishing 3rd in all-around. She won gold with hoop and ribbon at the events finals. On March 17–19, Taseva competed at the 2018 Kyiv Grand Prix where she won the silver medal in the all-around behind Ekaterina Selezneva, she qualified in 3 apparatus finals: taking the silver with ball, ribbon and bronze with clubs. On March March 24–25, Taseva finished 4th in the all-around at the 2018 Thiais Grand Prix behind teammate Boryana Kaleyn. on March 30-April 1, Taseva began the world cup events competing at the 2018 Sofia World Cup finishing 4th in the all-around behind Israel's Linoy Ashram, she qualified in all the finals and bagged individual medals with gold in clubs, silver in hoop, ribbon and bronze in ball. On April 13–15, Taseva won the silver medal in the all-around at the 2018 Pesaro World Cup behind Dina Averina, she qualified to all apparatus finals; taking silver with ribbon, bronze with hoop, clubs and finished 4th in ball. On April 27–29, Taseva competed in a World Challenge Cup event at the 2018 Baku World Cup where she won finished 4th in the all-around behind Belarusian newcomer Anastasiia Salos, she qualified in 2 apparatus finals finishing 4th in ball and 7th in hoop.

=== 2021 season ===
Taseva represented Bulgaria at the 2020 Summer Olympics and finished first in the qualification for the individual all-around, making her the fourth reserve for the all-around final. On August 6, right after her Olympic performance, Katrin announced her retirement from competitive sport on her Instagram profile.

== Routine music information ==
Year	Apparatus	Music title
2020/2021	Hoop	Eye Of The Tiger by 2Cellos
2020/2021	Ball	Fallin' by Nicola Cavallaro
2020/2021	Clubs	Malagueña by Stanley Black
2020/2021	Ribbon	A Little Party Never Killed Nobody (All We Got) by Fergie ft. Q-Tip, GoonRock
2019	Hoop	Lovers in Paris by Jacob Gurevitsch
2019	Ball	Elea by Worakls (Jimmy Sax' Rework)
2019	Clubs	Think by Aretha Franklin
2019	Ribbon	I'll Never Love again (from A Star Is Born) by Lady Gaga
2019	Ribbon (Second)	Mayas by Hanine
2018	Hoop	"Camino" by Lili Ivanova / Ivan Peev
2018	Ball	"Epilogue (La La Land)" by Justin Hurwitz
2018	Clubs	"Overture (from Jesus Christ Superstar)" by Andrew Lloyd Webber
2018	Ribbon	"Uptown Funk" by Mark Ronson, Bruno Mars
2017	Hoop	"La Voce Del Silenzio / Se Bruciasse La Citta" by Massimo Ranieri, Silvia Mezzanotte, Linda Valor
2017	Ball	"The Beauty" by Beloslava (Белослава - Красотата)
2017	Clubs (2nd)	"Danza Ritual del Fuego" by Paco de Lucía, Carlos Montoya
2017	Clubs (1st)	"Rozov Kadilak" by Kolio Gilan Band
2017	Ribbon	"Djelem Djelem" by Barcelona Gipsy Klezmer Orchestra

== Competitive highlights ==
(Team competitions in seniors are held only at the World Championships, Europeans and other Continental Games.)

International: Senior
Year	Event	AA	Team	Hoop	Ball	Clubs	Ribbon
2021	Olympic Games	14th (Q)					
2021	European Championships	7th	4th	6th	7th	5th	5th
2019	World Cup Kazan	3rd		5th	5th	7th	4th
2019	European Games	6th		11th (Q)	2nd	4th	3rd
2019	Grand Prix Brno	3rd		4th	2nd	2nd	3rd
2019	Grand Prix Holon	6th		3rd	6th	1st	
2019	European Championships		3rd		7th	4th	8th
2019	World Cup Sofia	3rd		6th	2nd	2nd	2nd
2019	World Cup Pesaro	5th		6th	4th	18th (Q)	2nd
2018
2018	World Championships	6th	2nd	7th	8th	8th	
2018	Kazan World Cup	5th		4th	4th	7th	4th
2018	World Cup Minsk	5th		4th	4th		7th
2018	World Cup Baku	4th		7th	4th		2nd
2018	World Cup Pesaro	2nd		3rd	4th	3rd	2nd
2018	World Cup Sofia	4th		2nd	3rd	1st	2nd
2018	Grand Prix Thiais	4th					3rd
2018	Grand Prix Kyiv	2nd			2nd	3rd	2nd
2018	Baltic Hoop	3rd			1st		1st
2017	Dalia Kutkaite Cup	5th					
2017	World Championships	10th					
2017	World Cup Kazan	6th			6th	5th	5th
2017	World Cup Minsk	6th			6th	5th	5th
2017	European Championships		3rd	4th			2nd
2017	World Cup Sofia	2nd			4th	7th	3rd
2017	World Cup Tashkent	3rd		4th	3rd	2nd	5th
2017	World Cup Pesaro	5th		4th	5th	8th	6th
2017	Grand Prix Marbella	6th					
2017	Grand Prix Kyiv	4th			1st		
2016
2016	European Championships	13th					
2016	World Cup Baku	9th					
National
Year	Event	AA	Team	Hoop	Ball	Clubs	Ribbon
2020	Bulgarian Championships	2nd		3rd	3rd	1st	8th
2019	Bulgarian Championships	2nd		3rd	1st	2nd	2nd
2018	Bulgarian Championships	1st		2nd	2nd	1st	1st
2017	Bulgarian Championships	2nd		8th	2nd	1st	2nd
2016	Bulgarian Championships	2nd					
Q = Qualifications (Did not advance to Event Final due to the 2 gymnast per country rule, only Top 8 highest score); WR = World Record; WD = Withdrew; NT = No Team Competition; OC = Out of Competition(competed but scores not counted for qualifications/results)
