= Rhythmic gymnastics at the 2017 World Games =

- Venue: Centennial Hall
- Dates: 21–22 July 2017
- No. of events: 4
- Competitors: 24 from 19 nations

The rhythmic gymnastics competition at the 2017 World Games took place from July 21 to July 22, in Wrocław in Poland, at the Centennial Hall.

== Participating nations ==
- Australia (1)
- Austria (1)
- Azerbaijan (1)
- Belarus (1)
- Bulgaria (2)
- France (1)
- Greece (1)
- Israel (1)
- Italy (1)
- Japan (1)
- Kazakhstan (1)
- Poland (1)
- Russia (2)
- South Africa (1)
- South Korea (1)
- Spain (1)
- Ukraine (2)
- United States (1)
- Uzbekistan (1)

== Medal table ==
Rank	Nation	Gold	Silver	Bronze	Total
1	Russia	4	3	1	8
2	Israel	0	1	1	2
3	Belarus	0	0	2	2
Totals (3 entries)		4	4	4	12

=== Events ===
Event	Gold	Silver	Bronze
Ball	Arina Averina; Russia	Dina Averina; Russia	Katsiaryna Halkina; Belarus
Clubs	Dina Averina; Russia	Linoy Ashram; Israel	Arina Averina; Russia
Hoop	Arina Averina; Russia	Dina Averina; Russia	Linoy Ashram; Israel
Ribbon	Arina Averina; Russia	Dina Averina; Russia	Katsiaryna Halkina; Belarus
