= 2021 FIG Rhythmic Gymnastics World Cup series =

International rhythm gymnastics competition

The 2021 FIG World Cup circuit in Rhythmic Gymnastics is a series of competitions officially organized and promoted by the International Gymnastics Federation. The events had originally been scheduled to be held in 2020, but were postponed to 2021 due to the COVID-19 pandemic.

With stopovers in Europe and Asia, the World Cup competitions are scheduled for March 26–28 in Sofia (BUL), April 16–18 in Tashkent (UZB), May 7–9 in Baku (AZE), May 28–30 in Pesaro (ITA). World Challenge Cup competitions are scheduled for July 2–4 in Minsk (BLR), July 9–11 in Moscow (RUS), October 15–17 in Cluj Napoca (ROU). Originally, the Cluj Napoca stage was scheduled to be held June, but it was postponed to October, and the World Challenge Cup stage in Portimão, Portugal, was eventually cancelled.

This year's World Cup series also served as qualifications for the 2020 Summer Olympics, with the top 3 ranked gymnasts (max. 1 per NOC), not already qualified at the 2019 Rhythmic Gymnastics World Championships, achieving a quota for their NOC at the individual all-around event.

== Formats ==
World Cup
Date	Event	Location	Type
March 26–28	FIG World Cup 2021	(Bulgaria) Sofia	Individuals and groups
April 16–18	FIG World Cup 2021	(Uzbekistan) Tashkent	Individuals and groups
May 7–9	FIG World Cup 2021	(Azerbaijan) Baku	Individuals and groups
May 28–30	FIG World Cup 2021	(Italy) Pesaro	Individuals and groups

World Challenge Cup
Date	Event	Location	Type
July 2–4	FIG World Challenge Cup 2021	(Belarus) Minsk	Individuals and groups
July 9–11	FIG World Challenge Cup 2021	(Russia) Moscow	Individuals and groups
~~October 8–10~~	~~FIG World Challenge Cup 2021~~	~~(Portugal) Portimão~~	~~Individuals and groups~~
~~June 25–27~~; October 15–17	FIG World Challenge Cup 2021	(Romania) Cluj Napoca	Individuals and groups

== Medal winners ==
=== All-around ===
==== Individual ====
Competitions	Gold	Silver	Bronze
World Cup
Sofia	(Israel) Linoy Ashram	(Bulgaria) Boryana Kaleyn	(Belarus) Alina Harnasko
Tashkent	(Russia) Dina Averina	(Russia) Arina Averina	(Belarus) Anastasiia Salos
Baku	(Russia) Daria Trubnikova	(Bulgaria) Boryana Kaleyn	(Russia) Lala Kramarenko
Pesaro	(Russia) Dina Averina	(Russia) Arina Averina	(Belarus) Alina Harnasko
World Challenge Cup
Minsk	(Belarus) Alina Harnasko	(Russia) Lala Kramarenko	(Belarus) Anastasiia Salos
Moscow	(Russia) Dina Averina	(Russia) Lala Kramarenko	(Slovenia) Ekaterina Vedeneeva
Cluj Napoca	(Bulgaria) Boryana Kaleyn	(Italy) Milena Baldassarri	(Russia) Daria Trubnikova

==== Group ====
Competitions	Gold	Silver	Bronze
World Cup
Sofia	Bulgaria	Azerbaijan	Japan
Tashkent	Uzbekistan	Israel	Belarus
Baku	Bulgaria	Italy	Belarus
Pesaro	Russia	Bulgaria	Belarus
World Challenge Cup
Minsk	Israel	Bulgaria	Uzbekistan
Moscow	Russia	Japan	Uzbekistan
Cluj Napoca	Italy	Germany	France

=== Apparatus ===
==== Hoop ====
Competitions	Gold	Silver	Bronze
World Cup
Sofia	(Bulgaria) Boryana Kaleyn	(Belarus) Anastasiia Salos	(Israel) Linoy Ashram
Tashkent	(Russia) Dina Averina	(Italy) Sofia Raffaeli	(Belarus) Anastasiia Salos
Baku	(Israel) Linoy Ashram	(Russia) Lala Kramarenko	(Belarus) Alina Harnasko
Pesaro	(Russia) Dina Averina	(Israel) Linoy Ashram	(Russia) Arina Averina
World Challenge Cup
Minsk	(Belarus) Alina Harnasko	(Belarus) Anastasiia Salos	(Russia) Lala Kramarenko
Moscow	(Russia) Dina Averina	(Russia) Lala Kramarenko	(Latvia) Jelizaveta Polstjanaja
Cluj Napoca	(Bulgaria) Boryana Kaleyn	(Russia) Irina Annenkova	(Russia) Daria Trubnikova

==== Ball ====
Competitions	Gold	Silver	Bronze
World Cup
Sofia	(Israel) Linoy Ashram	(Belarus) Alina Harnasko	(Bulgaria) Boryana Kaleyn
Tashkent	(Russia) Arina Averina	(Russia) Dina Averina	(Belarus) Alina Harnasko
Baku	(Italy) Alexandra Agiurgiuculese	(Russia) Daria Trubnikova	(Bulgaria) Boryana Kaleyn
Pesaro	(Israel) Linoy Ashram	(Russia) Dina Averina	(Russia) Arina Averina
World Challenge Cup
Minsk	(Belarus) Alina Harnasko	(Russia) Lala Kramarenko	(Belarus) Anastasiia Salos
Moscow	(Russia) Dina Averina	(Russia) Lala Kramarenko	(Slovenia) Ekaterina Vedeneeva
Cluj Napoca	(Bulgaria) Boryana Kaleyn	(Russia) Daria Trubnikova	(Italy) Alexandra Agiurgiuculese

==== Clubs ====
Competitions	Gold	Silver	Bronze
World Cup
Sofia	(Bulgaria) Boryana Kaleyn	(Italy) Sofia Raffaeli	(Bulgaria) Katrin Taseva
Tashkent	(Russia) Arina Averina	(Russia) Dina Averina	(Belarus) Alina Harnasko
Baku	(Israel) Linoy Ashram	(Bulgaria) Boryana Kaleyn	(Russia) Lala Kramarenko
Pesaro	(Russia) Arina Averina	(Israel) Linoy Ashram	(Russia) Dina Averina
World Challenge Cup
Minsk	(Belarus) Alina Harnasko	(Russia) Lala Kramarenko	(Israel) Nicol Zelikman
Moscow	(Russia) Dina Averina	(Russia) Lala Kramarenko	(Slovenia) Ekaterina Vedeneeva
Cluj Napoca	(Bulgaria) Boryana Kaleyn	(Russia) Irina Annenkova	(Russia) Daria Trubnikova

==== Ribbon ====
Competitions	Gold	Silver	Bronze
World Cup
Sofia	(Bulgaria) Boryana Kaleyn	(Belarus) Anastasiia Salos	(Italy) Sofia Raffaeli
Tashkent	(Belarus) Alina Harnasko	(Italy) Sofia Raffaeli	(Russia) Dina Averina
Baku	(Bulgaria) Boryana Kaleyn	(Belarus) Alina Harnasko	(Bulgaria) Katrin Taseva
Pesaro	(Russia) Arina Averina	(Russia) Dina Averina	(Belarus) Alina Harnasko
World Challenge Cup
Minsk	(Russia) Lala Kramarenko	(Belarus) Anastasiia Salos	(Ukraine) Khrystyna Pohranychna
Moscow	(Russia) Dina Averina	(Russia) Lala Kramarenko	(Slovenia) Ekaterina Vedeneeva
Cluj Napoca	(Bulgaria) Boryana Kaleyn	(Italy) Milena Baldassarri	(Italy) Alexandra Agiurgiuculese

==== 5 balls ====
Competitions	Gold	Silver	Bronze
World Cup
Sofia	Bulgaria	Japan	Russia
Tashkent	Uzbekistan	Belarus	Israel
Baku	Bulgaria	Italy	Azerbaijan
Pesaro	Italy	Russia	Japan
World Challenge Cup
Minsk	Bulgaria	Israel	Belarus
Moscow	Russia	Uzbekistan	Japan
Cluj Napoca	Italy	Germany	France

==== 4 clubs and 3 hoops ====
Competitions	Gold	Silver	Bronze
World Cup
Sofia	Bulgaria	Japan	Azerbaijan
Tashkent	Belarus	Uzbekistan	Israel
Baku	Bulgaria	Italy	Belarus
Pesaro	Italy	Russia	Israel
World Challenge Cup
Minsk	Israel	Bulgaria	Uzbekistan
Moscow	Russia	Uzbekistan	Japan
Cluj Napoca	Italy	Germany	Finland

== Overall medal table ==
Rank	Nation	Gold	Silver	Bronze	Total
1	Russia (RUS)	19	21	11	51
2	Bulgaria (BUL)	16	7	4	27
3	Israel (ISR)	7	4	5	16
4	Italy (ITA)	6	8	3	17
5	Belarus (BLR)	6	6	15	27
6	Uzbekistan (UZB)	2	3	3	8
7	Japan (JPN)	0	3	4	7
8	Germany (GER)	0	3	0	3
9	Azerbaijan (AZE)	0	1	2	3
10	Slovenia (SLO)	0	0	4	4
11	France (FRA)	0	0	2	2
12	Finland (FIN)	0	0	1	1
12	Latvia (LAT)	0	0	1	1
12	Ukraine (UKR)	0	0	1	1
Totals (14 entries)		56	56	56	168

== See also ==
- Gymnastics at the 2020 Summer Olympics
- 2021 FIG Artistic Gymnastics World Cup series
- 2021 Rhythmic Gymnastics Grand Prix circuit
- 2021 Rhythmic Gymnastics World Championships
