= Linoy Ashram =

Israeli rhythmic gymnast (born 1999)

- לינוי אשרם
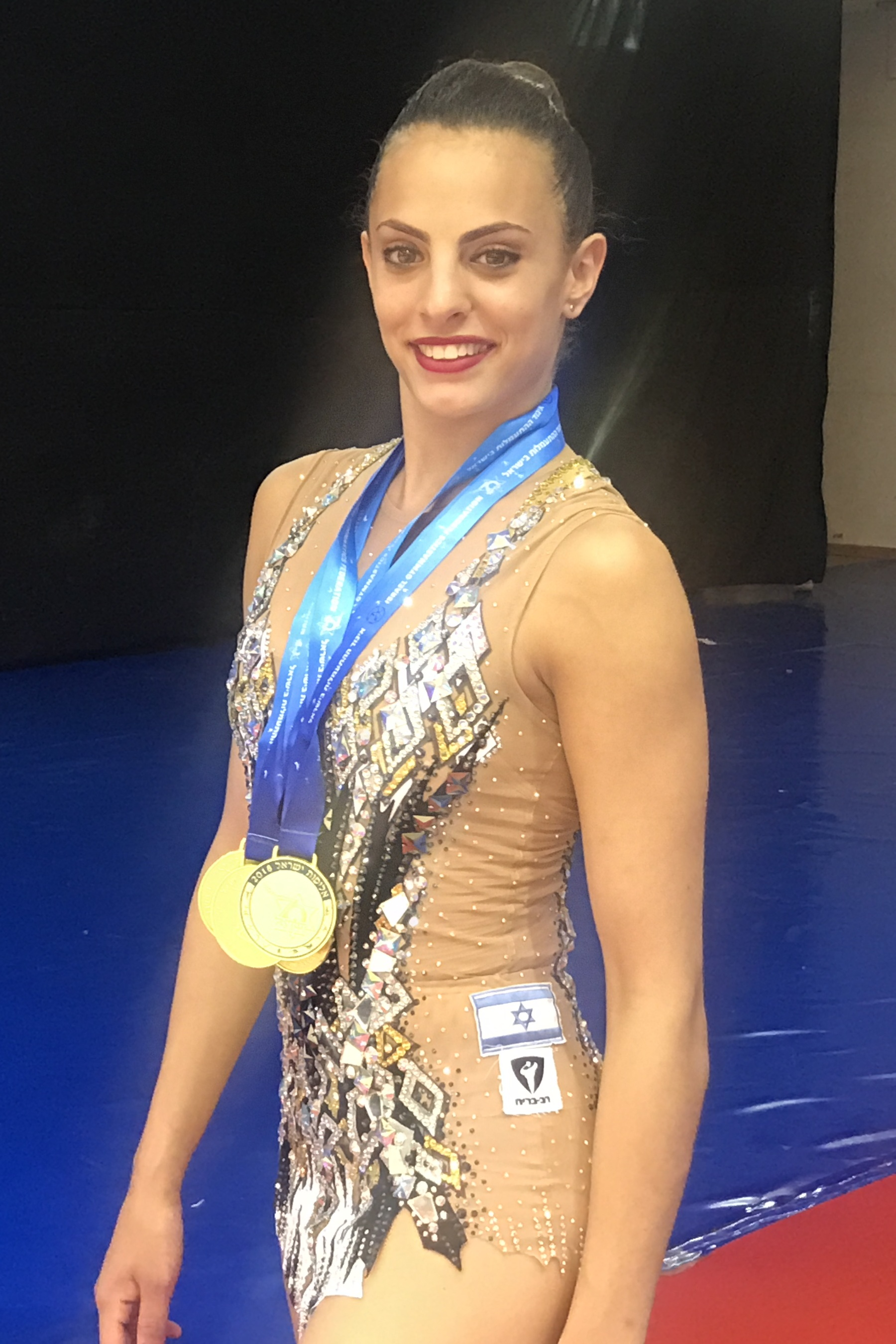
- Ashram in 2018

Personal information
- Full name: Linoy Ashram
- Born: 13 May 1999 (age 27) Rishon LeZion, Israel
- Height: 1.65 m (5 ft 5 in)

Gymnastics career
- Discipline: Rhythmic gymnastics
- Country represented: Israel; (2014–2022)
- Club: Hapoel Rishon LeZion
- Head coach: Ayelet Zussman
- Choreographer: Ayelet Zussman
- Eponymous skills: "The Ashram" — back-bend turn on floor with help
- Retired: 4 April 2022
- World ranking: 7 WC 5 WCC (2019); 1 WC 2 WCC (2018); 8 WC 19 WCC (2017); 13 (2016)
Medal record
Event	1st	2nd	3rd
Olympic Games	1	0	0
World Championships	0	6	5
World Games	0	1	1
European Games	2	2	0
European Championships	2	2	3
Grand Prix Final	1	4	1
FIG World Cup	18	17	20
Total	24	32	30
Representing Israel
Rhythmic Gymnastics
Olympic Games
Gold medal – first place	2020 Tokyo	All-Around
World Championships
Silver medal – second place	2018 Sofia	All-Around
Silver medal – second place	2018 Sofia	Hoop
Silver medal – second place	2019 Baku	Hoop
Silver medal – second place	2019 Baku	Clubs
Silver medal – second place	2019 Baku	Ribbon
Silver medal – second place	2019 Baku	Team
Bronze medal – third place	2017 Pesaro	All-around
Bronze medal – third place	2017 Pesaro	Ribbon
Bronze medal – third place	2018 Sofia	Ribbon
Bronze medal – third place	2019 Baku	All-around
Bronze medal – third place	2019 Baku	Ball
European Championships
Gold medal – first place	2020 Kyiv	All-around
Gold medal – first place	2021 Varna	Clubs
Silver medal – second place	2021 Varna	Hoop
Silver medal – second place	2021 Varna	Ball
Bronze medal – third place	2017 Budapest	Hoop
Bronze medal – third place	2017 Budapest	Clubs
Bronze medal – third place	2021 Varna	Team
World Games
Silver medal – second place	2017 Wroclaw	Clubs
Bronze medal – third place	2017 Wroclaw	Hoop
European Games
Gold medal – first place	2019 Minsk	Ball
Gold medal – first place	2019 Minsk	Clubs
Silver medal – second place	2019 Minsk	All-around
Silver medal – second place	2019 Minsk	Ribbon
Grand Prix Final
Gold medal – first place	2015 Brno	Clubs
Silver medal – second place	2015 Brno	All-around
Silver medal – second place	2015 Brno	Hoop
Silver medal – second place	2015 Brno	Ball
Silver medal – second place	2015 Brno	Ribbon
Bronze medal – third place	2016 Eilat	Clubs
Maccabiah Games
Gold medal – first place	2017 Tel Aviv	All-around
Gold medal – first place	2017 Tel Aviv	Hoop
Gold medal – first place	2017 Tel Aviv	Clubs
Gold medal – first place	2017 Tel Aviv	Ribbon
Gold medal – first place	2017 Tel Aviv	Ball
Junior European Championships
Bronze medal – third place	2014 Baku	Clubs
Bronze medal – third place	2014 Baku	Ribbon
- Last updated on: 4 August 2021.

Linoy Ashram (Hebrew: לינוי אשרם; born 13 May 1999) is a retired Israeli individual rhythmic gymnast. She is the 2020 Olympic All-around Champion, the 2018 World All-around silver medalist, two-time (2017, 2019) World All-around bronze medalist, the 2020 European All-around champion, and the 2019 European Games All-around silver medalist. She is the third Israeli athlete and first Israeli woman to win an Olympic gold medal in any sport, and the first Israeli rhythmic gymnast to win an Olympic medal. She became the first rhythmic gymnast from outside a post-Soviet republic to win a gold medal at an Olympics where former Soviet states participated.

Ashram announced her retirement from competitive gymnastics at a press conference in Tel Aviv on 4 April 2022.

== Early life ==
Ashram was born in Rishon LeZion, Israel, to Israeli-born parents of both Yemeni Jewish and Greek Jewish descent. Her father Oren is a standing army soldier in the IDF and her mother Hedva is a kindergarten teacher assistant. She has an older sister, Chen, an older brother, Idan, and a younger sister, Hila.

In November 2017, at the age of 18, Ashram enrolled in the Israel Defense Forces as a soldier, where she worked as an administrative assistant. She had an honorable discharge in December 2019 after serving her mandatory enlistment.

As of 2018, Ashram resides in her Israeli hometown of Rishon LeZion.

In 2019, she started studying education and society at the Ono Academic College in Kiryat Ono, Israel. She completed her studies in 2022. She works as a member of the training staff for the Israeli national rhythmic gymnastics team as of mid-2022.

== Sports career ==
Her head coach and choreographer is Israeli former national champion Ayelet Zussman.

=== Junior ===
Ashram appeared in international competitions in 2011. In 2014, Ashram started her season competing in the 2014 Miss Valentine Cup in Tartu, Estonia, then in the junior division at the 2014 Moscow Grand Prix where she finished 9th in the all-around; following her placement she earned a qualification for Israel to compete for the Youth Olympic Games. Ashram competed in the World Cup series Pesaro, and in Tashkent where she won silver medal in clubs and hoop. In her next event at the Minsk World Cup, she took silver for Team Israel and finished 4th in the all-event finals.

On 10–16 June 2014, Ashram competed at the 2014 European Junior Championships and qualified to all four event finals, taking the bronze medal in clubs and ribbon, placing 4th in ball, and 5th in hoop. Ashram then competed at the World Cup in Sofia, where she finished 4th in all-around. Ashram went on to represent Israel at the 2014 Youth Olympic Games in Nanjing, China, where she finished 5th in all-around finals behind Romania's Ana Luiza Filiorianu. She was the flag bearer of the closing ceremony in the Youth Olympic Games. In November, Ashram won the all-around gold at the 2014 JGP Final in Innsbruck, Austria, ahead of Moldova's Nicoleta Dulgheru.

=== Senior ===
==== 2015 ====
In the 2015 season, Ashram debuted as a senior competing in the international tournament at the 2015 Moscow Grand Prix, finishing 4th in the all-around. On 15–16 May, Ashram competed at the 2015 Holon Grand Prix, finishing 11th in all-around. In August, Ashram competed at the MTK Budapest Cup, finishing 5th in the all-around and qualifying to three apparatus finals. She won the all-around bronze at the Yoldyz Cup International in Kazan, Russia. On 9–13 September, Ashram (together with teammates Neta Rivkin and Victoria Veinberg Filanovsky) competed at the 2015 World Championships in Stuttgart, with Team Israel finishing 4th. On 16–18 October, Ashram competed at the 2015 Grand Prix Final in Brno, where she won the all-around silver medal with a total of 70.000 points. She qualified to all apparatus finals, taking silver in hoop, ball, and in the last two apparatus, due to Margarita Mamun's withdrawal in the last two events, Ashram won gold in clubs and another silver in ribbon behind Uzbekistani Anastasiya Serdyukova. Ashram became the second-youngest Grand Prix Final medalist since Yanina Batyrchina. In November, Ashram won the all-around gold at the 2015 Happy Cup in Asker, Norway, ahead of Moldova's Nicoleta Dulgheru.

==== 2016 ====
Ashram began her season competing at the 2016 Grand Prix Moscow, finishing 16th in the all-around and qualifying for the hoop, ball, and ribbon finals. On 12–13 March, Ashram competed at the MTM Tournament in Ljubljana, Slovenia, where she won the all-around bronze with a total of 71.350 points, in the apparatus finals; she won bronze in hoop, ribbon placed 4th in ball and 7th in clubs. At the 30th Thiais Grand Prix event in Paris, Ashram finished 8th in the all-around with a total of 71.100 points; she qualified for three apparatus finals. On 1–3 April, Ashram then competed at the 2016 Pesaro World Cup, where she finished 9th in the all-around and qualified for the ribbon final, placing 8th. She won the all-around silver medal at the 2016 Israeli Championships behind Victoria Veinberg Filanovsky. On 13–15 May, Ashram competed at the 2016 Tashkent World Cup, where she won bronze in the all-around (71.800) edging out teammate Neta Rivkin, Ashram qualified for all four apparatus finals: winning bronze in ball (tied with Anastasiya Serdyukova), 4th in hoop and clubs, and 6th in ribbon. On 27–29 May, Ashram finished 7th in the all-around at the 2016 Sofia World Cup, with a total of 70.800 points; she qualified in hoop, ball and ribbon finals. On 17–19 June, Ashram competed at the 2016 European Championships where she finished in 8th place with a total of 72.074 points. On 23–24 September, Ashram culminated her season with her competition at the 2016 Grand Prix Final in Eilat, where she finished 4th in the all-around with a total of 72.850 points behind Russian Arina Averina. She qualified for all the apparatus finals; winning a bronze in clubs, placed 4th in hoop and ball, and 5th in ribbon.

==== 2017 ====
Ashram competed at the 2017 Grand Prix Moscow, finishing 6th in the all-around and qualifying for all the apparatus finals; she won bronze in clubs, placed 4th in ball, and 5th in hoop and ribbon. She then competed at the 2017 Tashkent World Cup, finishing 8th in the all-around and qualified for three apparatus finals, taking bronze in hoop, and finishing 6th in ball and 5th in clubs. On 5–7 May, Ashram competed at the 2017 Sofia World Cup, and took bronze in the all-around with a total of 70.300 points; she qualified for all the apparatus finals and won silver in hoop, bronze in clubs, and placed 4th in ribbon and 8th in ball. On 19–21 May, Ashram together with teammate Victoria Veinberg Filanovsky represented the individual senior for Israel at the 2017 European Championships; she qualified for all the apparatus finals and won bronze medals in clubs, and finished 5th in ball and 6th in ribbon. At the 2017 Maccabiah Games, she won all five gold medals (the all-around, ball, ribbon, hoop, and clubs). Ashram competed at the quadrennial-held 2017 World Games in Wrocław, Poland, from 20 to 30 July; she qualified for all the apparatus finals, winning a silver medal in clubs ahead of Arina Averina, a bronze in hoop behind Russian Dina Averina, and finished 8th in ball and 6th in ribbon. On 11–13 August, Ashram competed at the 2017 Kazan World Challenge Cup, and finished 4th in the all-around behind Katsiaryna Halkina; she qualified in all the apparatus finals and won four bronze medals, in hoop, ball, clubs and ribbon. From 30 August to 3 September, at the 2017 World Championships in Pesaro, Italy, she qualified in three apparatus finals, finishing 6th in hoop, 4th in ball, and winning bronze in ribbon. In the all-around, Ashram made history by becoming the first Israeli rhythmic gymnast to podium in the all-around by winning bronze at the Worlds; previously Neta Rivkin was the only Israeli to win a medal, but it was in an apparatus final (a bronze medal in hoop).

==== 2018 ====
Ashram's season began on 30 March – 1 April with a competition at the 2018 Sofia World Cup finishing with a bronze medal in the all-around, in the event finals, she won her first World Cup gold with ribbon, and finishing 4th in ball, clubs and 8th with hoop. On 13–15 April, Ashram won the bronze medal in the all-around at the 2018 Pesaro World Cup, she qualified to all apparatus finals; she won the gold with clubs, silver with ball, placed 5th in hoop and ribbon. On 20–22 April, at the 2018 Tashkent World Cup, Ashram won silver in the all-around (73.100 points) behind Aleksandra Soldatova, she qualified in all event finals taking silver in hoop, ball, ribbon and a bronze in clubs. She was the overall 2018 World Cup Series all-around winner based on her results in Sofia, Pesaro, and Tashkent. On 4–6 May, Ashram won her first gold medal in all-around (72.800 points) at the 2018 Guadalajara World Cup edging out Russians Aleksandra Soldatova and Arina Averina, in the apparatus finals: she took gold in ball, earned silver with hoop and ribbon and finished 6th in clubs.

==== 2019 ====
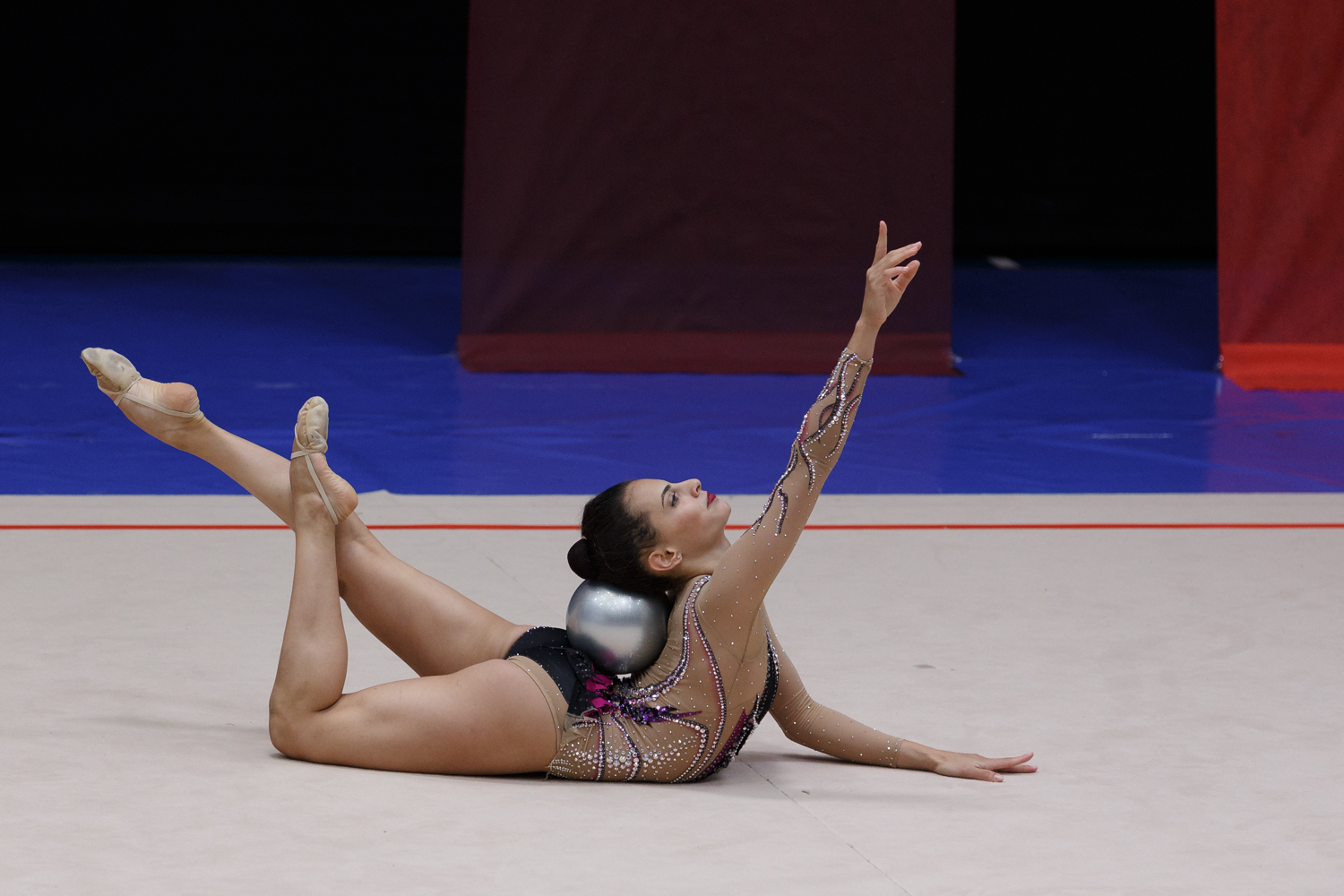
Ashram performing her ball exercise at Israel's 2019 national championships

She competed at the Sofia World Cup, winning silver in the all around behind Alexandra Soldatova and in the apparatus finals she won gold in hoop and clubs, and bronze in ball and ribbon. At the World Cup in Baku, she placed 6th behind Katrin Taseva in the all-around and only made it to 2 apparatus finals, where she took silver in hoop and gold in ball. In maces I occupy the tenth place and in tape the twenty-second. Ashram did not participate in the European Rhythmic Gymnastics Championships, in Baku, Azerbaijan, due to injury. She was replaced by her partner Yuliana Telegina. At the World Challenge Cup Minsk she won bronze in the all around behind Arina Averina, and in the apparatus finals she won gold in hoop, bronze in ball, silver in clubs and fourth place in ribbon. from Cluj-Napoca, won the all-around gold ahead of Ekaterina Selezneva and Nicol Zeliman, in the apparatus finals she won gold in hoop, ribbon, silver in clubs and fourth place in ball.

In June 2019, Ashram competed at the European Games, in Minsk, Belarus, winning gold in ball and clubs, and silver in ribbon and all-around. She finally competed at the 2019 World Championships Rhythmic Gymnastics, in Baku, Azerbaiyán, her most successful. She helped the Israeli team to win its first silver team medal (Nicol Zelikman, Yuliana Telegina, Nicol Voronkov) she won a bronze with ball and in the All-Around (despite a drop with hoop) and silver with hoop, clubs and ribbon.

==== 2020 ====
Ashram won a gold medal at the Gymnastic European championships in Kyiv on 29 September. She narrowly beat Alina Harnasko, her Belarusian competitor in the all-around competition with a total score of 100.9.

This last success placed Ashram as one of the main Israeli hopes for the 2020 Tokyo Olympics, which were postponed to 2021 due to the COVID-19 pandemic.

==== 2021 ====
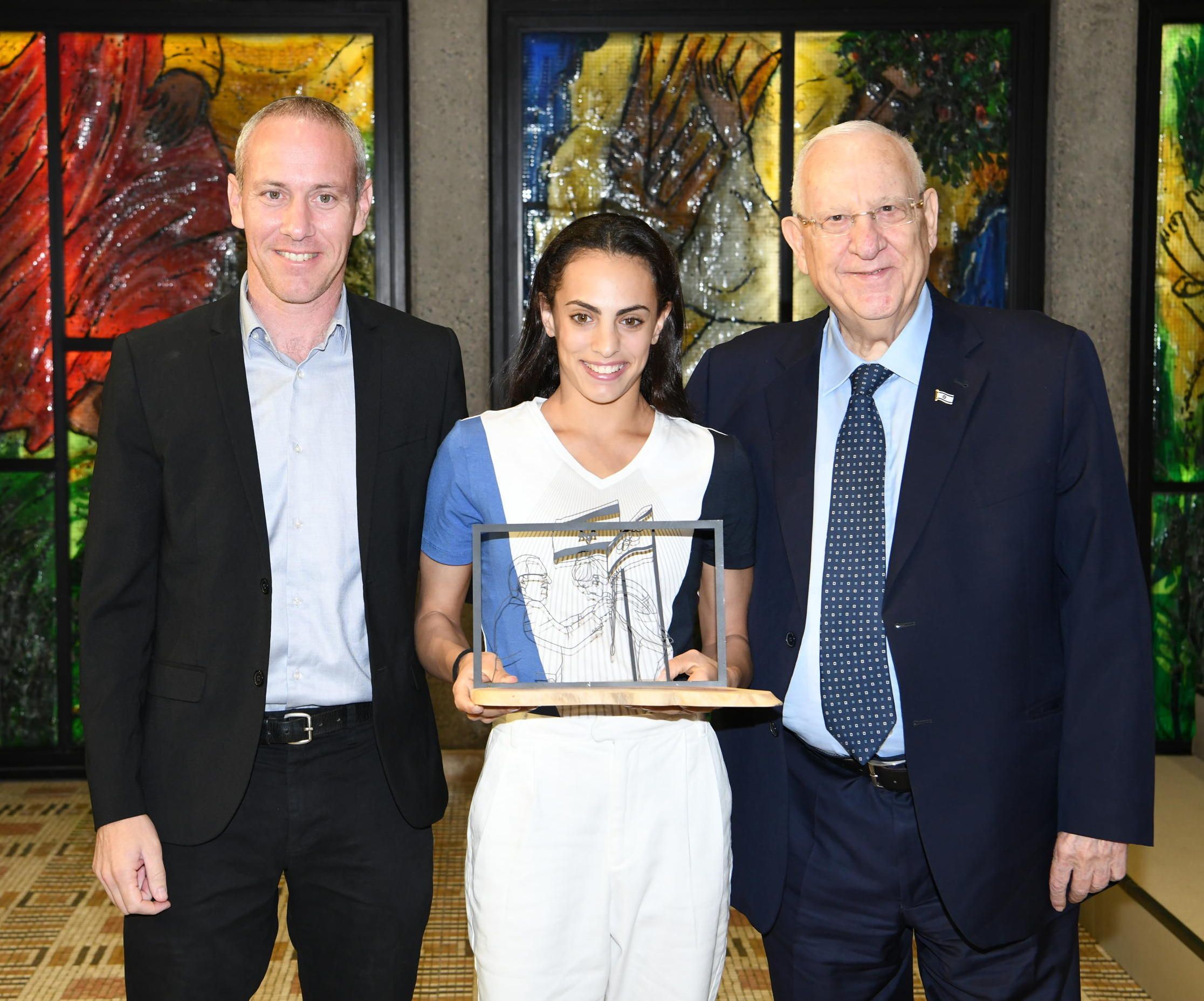
Ashram with the former President of Israel Reuven Rivlin (right) in 2021

In March 2021 she won two gold medals and one bronze medal in the Rhythmic Gymnastics World Cup in Sofia, Bulgaria. She also won 5 gold medal in the all-around individual, hoop, clubs, ribbon and ball on the Grand Prix Tel Aviv.

===== 2020 Tokyo Summer Olympics =====
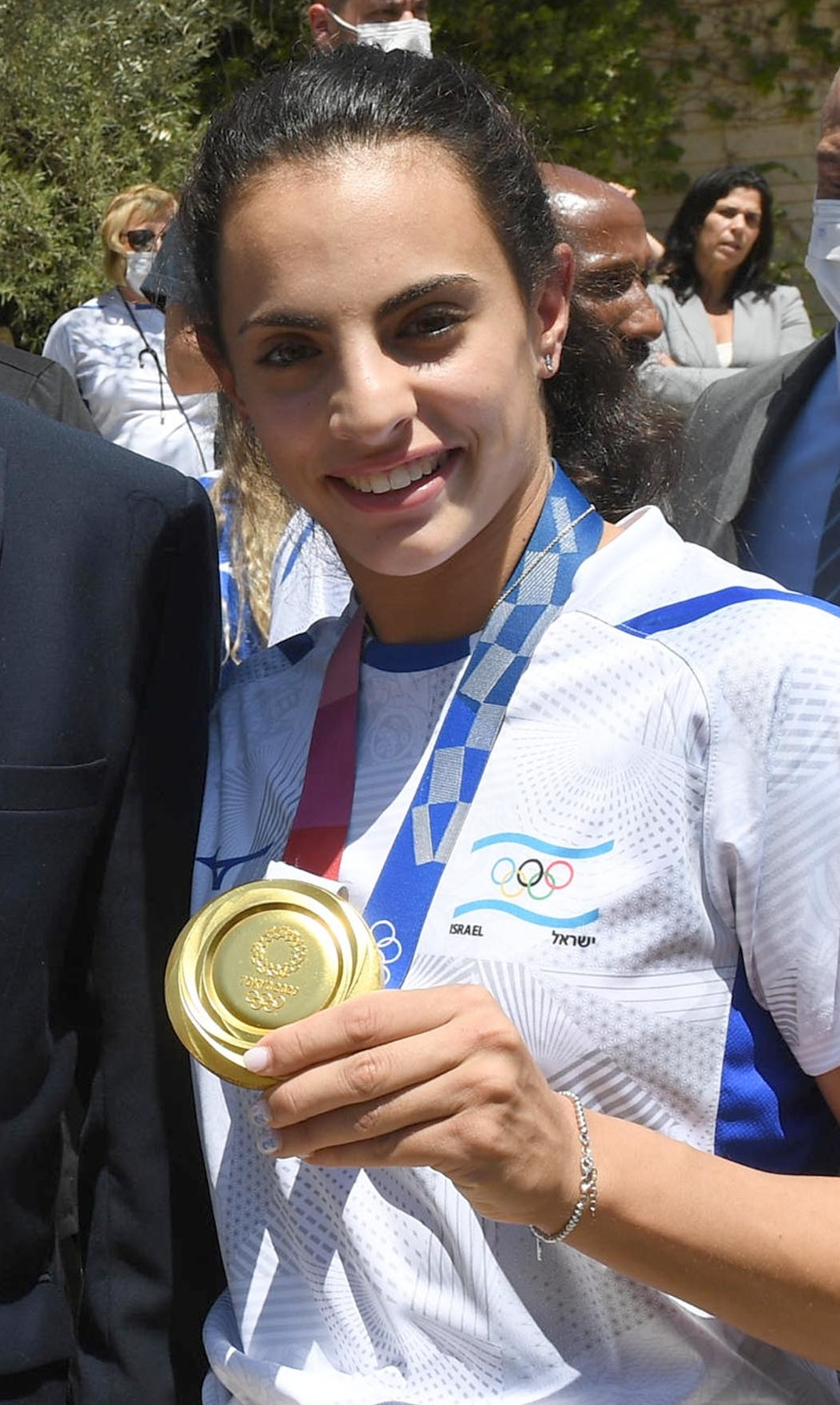
Linoy Ashram with her Olympic gold medal

On 7 August 2021, Ashram competed for Israel at the 2020 Summer Olympics. She won the gold medal in the rhythmic individual all-around competition.

It was the first time a non-Russian athlete won the gold medal since 1996, and the first time an athlete from outside the former Soviet Union won in an Olympics where the traditionally-dominant former Eastern Bloc states participated.

She qualified to the finals in 3rd place after receiving a combined score of 103.100 on all four apparatus. In the finals, she finished in first place after scoring 107.800 (27.550 on hoop, 28.300 on ball, 28.650 on clubs and 23.300 on ribbon), ahead of the qualifying-round favorite, ROC's (Russian Olympic Committee's) gymnast Dina Averina, by 0.150 points. Despite a 0.700 penalty for dropping the ribbon, Ashram led by a wide margin in both the clubs and hoop exercises, giving her the total higher score.

Some Russian newscasters, politicians and athletes had a hard time accepting Ashram's victory over Averina, claiming that the Israeli win was due to "unfair refereeing" towards the Russian gymnasts (similar claims were made regarding the group all-around contest in the 2020 Tokyo Olympics, where Bulgaria's team won gold while ROC's team finished second). Their claims were dismissed by the international governing body, the FIG (International Gymnastics Federation).

==== 2022 ====
On 4 April, Ashram announced her retirement at a press conference.

== Eponymous skill ==
Ashram has one eponymous skill listed in the code of points, a 180 degree turn on the stomach with the legs held in a stag split position with help from a hand or arm.

Name	Description	Difficulty (Note: Valid for the 2022-2024 Code of Points)
Ashram	180 degree rotation on the stomach, legs in stag position with help	0.3 base value

== Awards and recognition ==
- First Israeli rhythmic gymnast to win an individual all-around medal (bronze) at the 2017 World Championships.
- First Israeli to win gold in the all-around in the World Cup series which she won at the 2018 Guadalajara World Cup.
- First Israeli rhythmic gymnast to win gold at the Grand Prix Final.
- First Israeli to win gold in a World Cup series apparatus final.
- First Israeli rhythmic gymnast to win a European All-Around title, which she won at the 2020 European Championships.
- Second-youngest rhythmic gymnast to medal at the Grand Prix Final, after Yanina Batyrchina of the Russian Federation.
- First gymnast to win two consecutive All-Around titles in a World Challenge Cup circuit (Guadalajara and Minsk) in 2018.
- First Israeli rhythmic gymnast, the first rhythmic gymnast from outside a post-Soviet republic to win a gold medal at an Olympics where former Soviet states participated and the first non-Russian rhythmic gymnast since 1996, to become Olympic gold medalist in the individual all-around.
- First Israeli female Olympian to win a gold medal. Third Israeli Olympian to become a gold medalist.

== Musical scores ==
Year	Apparatus	Music title
2021	Hoop	Haste by Really Slow Motion, Giant Apes
2021	Ball	Big in Japan by Ane Brun
2021	Clubs	Crazy in Love, Diva, Run The World by Beyoncé, Level Up by Ciara
2021	Ribbon	Hava Nagila an Israeli folk song
2020	Hoop	Haste by Really Slow Motion, Giant Apes
2020	Ball	Hurt by Christina Aguilera
2020	Clubs	Crazy in Love, Diva, Run The World by Beyoncé, Level Up by Ciara
2020	Ribbon	Hava Nagila an Israeli folk song
2019	Hoop	Battle of the Kings by Audiomachine
2019	Ball	Im Ele HaHaim by Keren Peles
2019	Clubs	Istanbullu Gelin by Kobi Shaltiel, Mash & Matan
2019	Ribbon	One Night Only (Disco Version) by Dreamgirls
2018	Hoop	Obsidian by Audiomachine
2018	Ball	Encore Un Soir by Celine Dion
2018	Clubs	Footloose (Glee cast version)
2018	Ribbon	The Mask of Zorro soundtrack medley
2017	Hoop	Star Fusion by Really Slow Motion
2017	Ball	Hoy Tengo Ganas de Ti by Alejandro Fernández, Christina Aguilera
2017	Clubs	Don't Stop Me Now by Queen
2017	Ribbon	Suite Mignone, Holding Out for a Hero by Joop Celis, Silver Screen Superstars
2016	Hoop	Henry's Death' by BT
2016	Ball	Mi Amor by Benise
2016	Clubs	Run the World (Girls) by Beyoncé, I Am the Best by 2NE1
2016	Ribbon	Moon Trance by Lindsey Stirling
2015	Hoop	Albinoni in Rock by Claudio Simonetti
2015	Ball	Mi Amor by Benise
2015	Clubs	What a Feeling by Irene Cara
2015	Ribbon	Moon Trance by Lindsey Stirling

== Detailed Olympic results ==
Year	Competition Description	Location	Music	Apparatus	Rank-Final	Score-Final	Rank-Qualifying	Score-Qualifying
2020	Olympics	Tokyo		All-around	1st	107.800	3rd	103.100
2020	Olympics	Tokyo	Haste by Really Slow Motion, Giant Apes	Hoop	1st	27.550	13th	23.500
2020	Olympics	Tokyo	Big in Japan by Ane Brun	Ball	2nd	28.300	1st	28.250
2020	Olympics	Tokyo	Crazy in Love, Diva, Run The World by Beyoncé, Level Up by Ciara	Clubs	1st	28.650	3rd	27.850
2020	Olympics	Tokyo	Hava Nagila (Israeli folk song)	Ribbon	2nd	23.300	2nd	23.500

== Competitive highlights ==
(Team competitions in seniors are held only at the World Championships, Europeans and other Continental Games.)

International: Senior
Year	Event		AA	Team	Hoop	Ball	Clubs	Ribbon
2021	Olympic Games		1st					
2021	European Championships		4th	3rd	2nd	2nd	1st	4th
2021	World Cup	Pesaro	4th		2nd	1st	2nd	6th
2021	World Cup	Baku	5th		1st	5th	1st	16th (Q)
2021	World Cup	Sofia	1st		3rd	1st	4th	4th
2020	European Championships		1st					
2019
2019	World Championships		3rd	2nd	2nd	3rd	2nd	2nd
2019	World Challenge Cup	Cluj-Napoca	1st		1st	4th	2nd	1st
2019	World Challenge Cup	Minsk	3rd		1st	3rd	2nd	4th
2019	World Cup	Baku	6th		2nd	1st	10th (Q)	22nd (Q)
2019	World Cup	Sofia	2nd		1st	3rd	1st	3rd
2018
2018	World Championships		2nd	4th	2nd	24th (Q)	15th (Q)	3rd
2018	World Challenge Cup	Kazan	3rd		2nd	2nd	2nd	3rd
2018	World Challenge Cup	Minsk	1st		6th	3rd	1st	6th
2018	World Challenge Cup	Guadalajara	1st		2nd	1st	6th	2nd
2018	European Championships		4th					
2018	World Cup Tashkent	Tashkent	2nd		2nd	2nd	3rd	2nd
2018	World Cup Tashkent	Pesaro	3rd		5th	2nd	1st	5th
2018	World Cup Tashkent	Sofia	3rd		8th	4th	4th	1st
2017	World Championships		3rd		6th	4th	11th (Q)	3rd
2017	World Games				3rd	8th	2nd	6th
2017	World Challenge Cup	Kazan	4th		3rd	3rd	3rd	3rd
2017	European Championships				3rd	5th	3rd	6th
2017	World Cup Sofia	Sofia	3rd		2nd	8th	3rd	4th
2017	World Cup Sofia	Tashkent	8th		3rd	6th	5th	18th (Q)
2016	World Cup Sofia	Sofia	7th		6th	5th	13th (Q)	5th
2016	World Cup Sofia	Tashkent	3rd		4th	3rd	4th	6th
2016	World Cup Sofia	Pesaro	9th		11th (Q)	17th (Q)	11th (Q)	8th
2016	European Championships		8th					
Q = Qualifications (Did not advance to Event Final due to the 2 gymnast per country rule, only Top 8 highest score); WR = World Record; WD = Withdrew; NT = No Team Competition; OC = Out of Competition(competed but scores not counted for qualifications/results)

== Media appearances ==
In 2024, Ashram competed in the 10th season of Israel's Rokdim Im Kokhavim (Dancing with the Stars).

== Honors ==
At the 2022 Maccabiah Games, Ashram and fellow Olympic champion Artem Dolgopyat were honored as the final torchbearers who jointly lit the flame to officially open the event.

== See also ==
- List of select Jewish gymnasts
- List of Jewish Olympic medalists
- Sports in Israel
- Nicol Zelikman
- List of medalists at the Rhythmic Gymnastics Junior European Championships
- List of medalists at the Rhythmic Gymnastics World Championships
