= Zelikman =

Zelikman is a Yiddish surname. Notable people with the surname include:

- Nicol Zelikman, Israeli individual rhythmic gymnast
- Tatiana Zelikman (born 1939), Soviet and Russian pianist an music professor

== See also ==
- Zelikhman
