= Gymnastics at the 2020 Summer Olympics – Women's rhythmic individual all-around =

Women's rhythmic individual all-around at the Games of the XXXII Olympiad
- Venue: Ariake Gymnastics Centre
- Date: 6 August 2021 (qualification); 7 August 2021 (final)
- Competitors: 26 from 18 nations
- Winning total: 107.800

Medalists
1st place, gold medalist(s)		Linoy Ashram	Israel
2nd place, silver medalist(s)		Dina Averina	ROC
3rd place, bronze medalist(s)		Alina Harnasko	Belarus

The Women's rhythmic individual all-around competition at the 2020 Summer Olympics was held at the Ariake Gymnastics Centre in Tokyo, Japan, with the qualification taking place on 6 August and the final on 7 August.

Linoy Ashram became the first Israeli athlete to win a medal in the individual all-around competition and the first Israeli woman to win an Olympic gold medal. It was the first time a non-Russian athlete won the gold medal since 1996, and the first time an athlete from outside the former Soviet Union won in an Olympics where the traditionally-dominant former Eastern Bloc states participated.

== Competition format ==
The competition consisted of a qualification round and a final round. The top ten gymnasts in the qualification round advanced to the final round. In each round, the gymnasts performed four routines (ball, hoop, clubs, and ribbon), with the scores added to give a total.

== Qualification ==
Rank	Name	Hoop (rhythmic gymnastics)	Ball (rhythmic gymnastics)	Clubs (rhythmic gymnastics)	Ribbon (rhythmic gymnastics)	Total	Qualification
1	Dina Averina (ROC)	**27.625 (1)**	27.600 (2)	**28.275 (1)**	22.800 (3)	106.300	Q
2	Arina Averina (ROC)	27.225 (2)	27.250 (3)	28.100 (2)	**23.600 (1)**	106.175	Q
3	Linoy Ashram (ISR)	23.500 (13)	**28.250 (1)**	27.850 (3)	23.500 (2)	103.100	Q
4	Alina Harnasko (BLR)	26.400 (3)	27.200 (4)	23.900 (14)	21.750 (5)	99.250	Q
5	Anastasiia Salos (BLR)	25.700 (4)	26.300 (5)	24.550 (11)	22.600 (4)	99.150	Q
6	Milena Baldassarri (ITA)	24.550 (6)	25.700 (7)	25.650 (7)	20.150 (14)	96.050	Q
7	Nicol Zelikman (ISR)	24.350 (8)	25.500 (9)	24.950 (8)	21.100 (9)	95.900	Q
8	Boryana Kaleyn (BUL)	24.100 (9)	25.800 (6)	26.600 (4)	19.150 (18)	95.650	Q
9	Viktoriia Onopriienko (UKR)	23.800 (10)	24.300 (11)	26.100 (5)	21.250 (6)	95.450	Q
10	Khrystyna Pohranychna (UKR)	24.600 (5)	23.800 (13)	25.700 (6)	19.000 (19)	93.100	Q
11	Sumire Kita (JPN)	23.150 (14)	23.900 (12)	24.550 (10)	21.200 (8)	92.800	R
12	Evita Griskenas (USA)	23.675 (11)	23.400 (16)	23.850 (15)	20.775 (12)	91.700	R
13	Laura Zeng (USA)	22.000 (20)	23.700 (14)	24.700 (9)	21.000 (10)	91.400	R
14	Katrin Taseva (BUL)	24.450 (7)	24.600 (10)	24.400 (12)	17.650 (22)	91.100	R
15	Alexandra Agiurgiuculese (ITA)	22.050 (19)	25.600 (8)	24.150 (13)	19.250 (17)	91.050	
16	Ekaterina Vedeneeva (SLO)	22.800 (17)	23.550 (15)	22.550 (18)	20.800 (11)	89.700	
17	Salome Pazhava (GEO)	23.550 (12)	21.950 (22)	23.500 (17)	20.650 (13)	89.650	
18	Zohra Aghamirova (AZE)	23.000 (16)	23.400 (17)	21.500 (21)	19.900 (15)	87.800	
19	Chisaki Oiwa (JPN)	23.100 (15)	19.600 (24)	23.600 (16)	21.250 (7)	87.550	
20	Fanni Pigniczki (HUN)	21.200 (22)	22.400 (20)	21.350 (23)	19.450 (16)	84.400	
21	Alina Adilkhanova (KAZ)	20.550 (24)	22.450 (19)	22.200 (20)	18.600 (20)	83.800	
22	Rut Castillo (MEX)	22.350 (18)	22.700 (18)	21.500 (22)	16.200 (23)	82.750	
23	Lidiia Iakovleva (AUS)	20.600 (23)	19.800 (23)	22.325 (19)	16.050 (24)	78.775	
24	Ekaterina Fetisova (UZB)	19.800 (25)	19.400 (25)	17.950 (25)	18.350 (21)	75.500	
25	Habiba Marzouk (EGY)	21.700 (21)	22.150 (21)	21.100 (24)	8.400 (26)	73.350	
26	Márcia Lopes (CPV)	7.550 (26)	13.200 (26)	12.550 (26)	9.550 (25)	42.850	

- **Bold** — top score in each of the four routines.
- Italics — top score of all four routines.

== Final ==
Rank	Name	Hoop (rhythmic gymnastics)	Ball (rhythmic gymnastics)	Clubs (rhythmic gymnastics)	Ribbon (rhythmic gymnastics)	Total
1st place, gold medalist(s)	Linoy Ashram (ISR)	**27.550 (1)**	**28.300 (1)**	**28.650 (1)**	23.300 (2)	107.800
2nd place, silver medalist(s)	Dina Averina (ROC)	27.200 (2)	**28.300 (1)**	28.150 (2)	**24.000 (1)**	107.650
3rd place, bronze medalist(s)	Alina Harnasko (BLR)	26.500 (4)	27.500 (4)	27.600 (4)	21.100 (8)	102.700
4	Arina Averina (ROC)	26.850 (3)	27.900 (3)	27.800 (3)	19.550 (10)	102.100
5	Boryana Kaleyn (BUL)	25.900 (5)	25.625 (5)	26.650 (5)	22.450 (3)	100.625
6	Milena Baldassarri (ITA)	25.100 (7)	25.625 (5)	26.500 (6)	22.400 (4)	99.625
7	Nicol Zelikman (ISR)	23.700 (10)	24.150 (7)	25.600 (8)	22.150 (5)	95.600
8	Anastasiia Salos (BLR)	25.425 (6)	23.000 (10)	24.950 (9)	21.800 (6)	95.175
9	Khrystyna Pohranychna (UKR)	24.500 (8)	24.100 (8)	24.900 (10)	21.600 (7)	95.100
10	Viktoriia Onopriienko (UKR)	24.000 (9)	23.550 (9)	26.100 (7)	19.700 (9)	93.350

- **Bold** — top score in each of the four routines.
- Italics — top score of all four routines.

== Controversy in Russia ==
The final result of the competition was considered controversial in Russia, as Israeli gold medalist Linoy Ashram dropped her apparatus during her ribbon routine. The Russian Olympic Committee (ROC) claims that she did not receive a significant deduction (despite the fact that she did get a 0.700 deduction), which would have otherwise changed the standing due to the narrow score difference between Ashram and Russian silver medalist Dina Averina. Meanwhile, Olympic judges and supporters of Ashram note that Ashram's combined overall difficulty was over a point (+1.000) higher than Averina's, allowing Ashram to score well even had she received a 1.000 point deduction for dropping the apparatus.

After the results were in, the Russian Olympic Committee (ROC) coaches submitted an inquiry on Dina Averina's ribbon score, but the score was left unchanged. Averina commented that she believed the judges were supporting Ashram and punishing her, and she considers herself the champion. This position was universally supported by the Russian state-controlled media, which stated that Averina was the victim of "political games" and was purposefully denied gold, referring to it as "the conspiracy against Russia".

Their claims were dismissed by the international governing body, the FIG (International Gymnastics Federation), which confirmed that the FIG Rhythmic Gymnastics Technical Committee carried out a post-competition review of all evaluation components in every phase of the rhythmic gymnastics competition at Tokyo 2020. They stated:

"Following this process, we can confirm that no bias or irregularities were identified in the judging panels. The Rhythmic Gymnastics Technical Committee, therefore, confirms that the rankings and results of the Tokyo 2020 Olympic Games competitions in rhythmic gymnastics for both individuals and groups are fair and impartial. The FIG has set up strict criteria for objective selection of the most qualified and unbiased judges for the Olympic Games and we are pleased by their work."
