= Dina Averina =

Russian rhythmic gymnast (born 1998)

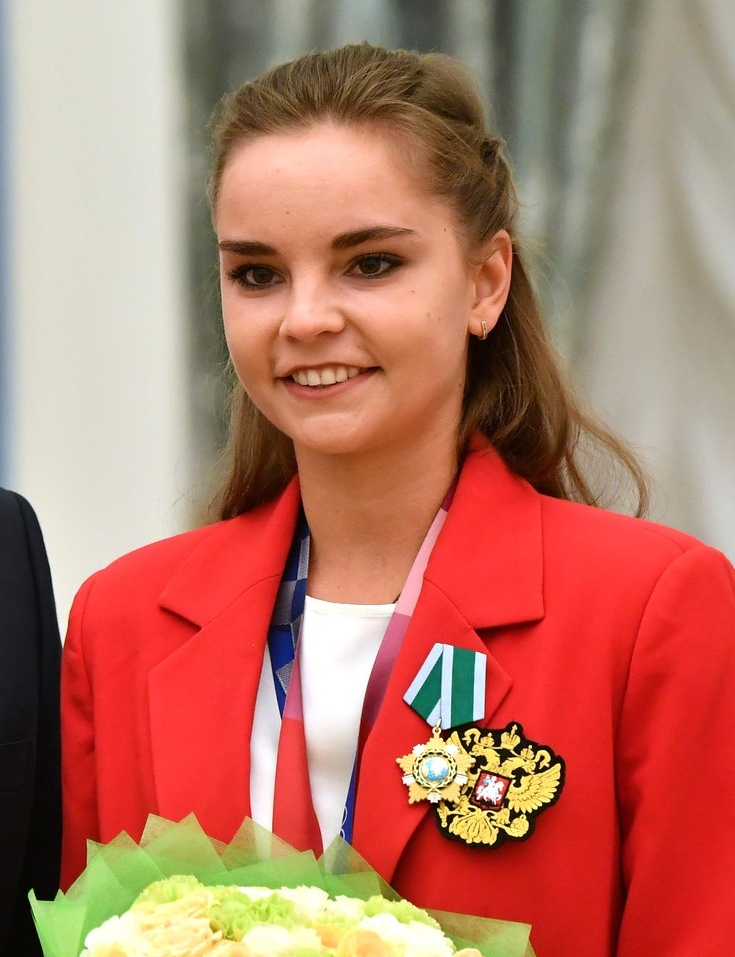
- Averina in 2021

Personal information
- Full name: Dina Alexeevna Averina
- Born: 13 August 1998 (age 28) Zavolzhye, Nizhny Novgorod Oblast, Russia
- Height: 165 cm (5 ft 5 in)
- Spouse: Dmitri Soloviev

Gymnastics career
- Discipline: Rhythmic gymnastics
- Country represented: Russia
- College team: Lesgaft National State University of Physical Education, Sport and Health
- Club: CSKA Moscow
- Gym: Novogorsk
- Head coach: Irina Viner
- Assistant coach: Yulia Barsukova
- Former coaches: Larisa Belova, Vera Shatalina
- Choreographer: Irina Zenovka, Tatiana Pomerantseva
- Retired: February 2024
- World ranking: 1 WC (2019); 8 WC 11 WCC (2018); 2 WC 9 WCC (2017); 8 (2016); 16 (2014)
Medal record
Rhythmic Gymnastics
Representing Russia, ROC and RGF
Event	1st	2nd	3rd
Olympic Games	0	1	0
World Championships	18	3	1
European Championships	10	4	1
European Games	3	1	1
World Games	1	3	0
Grand Prix Final	0	2	0
Total	32	14	3
Representing (Russia) ROC
Olympic Games
Silver medal – second place	2020 Tokyo	All-Around
World Championships
Gold medal – first place	2017 Pesaro	All-around
Gold medal – first place	2017 Pesaro	Hoop
Gold medal – first place	2017 Pesaro	Clubs
Gold medal – first place	2018 Sofia	All-Around
Gold medal – first place	2018 Sofia	Hoop
Gold medal – first place	2018 Sofia	Ball
Gold medal – first place	2018 Sofia	Clubs
Gold medal – first place	2018 Sofia	Team
Gold medal – first place	2019 Baku	All-Around
Gold medal – first place	2019 Baku	Ball
Gold medal – first place	2019 Baku	Clubs
Gold medal – first place	2019 Baku	Ribbon
Gold medal – first place	2019 Baku	Team
Gold medal – first place	2021 Kitakyushu	All-Around
Gold medal – first place	2021 Kitakyushu	Team
Gold medal – first place	2021 Kitakyushu	Hoop
Gold medal – first place	2021 Kitakyushu	Ball
Gold medal – first place	2021 Kitakyushu	Clubs
Silver medal – second place	2017 Pesaro	Ball
Silver medal – second place	2017 Pesaro	Ribbon
Silver medal – second place	2021 Kitakyushu	Ribbon
Bronze medal – third place	2019 Baku	Hoop
European Championships
Gold medal – first place	2017 Budapest	Team
Gold medal – first place	2017 Budapest	Hoop
Gold medal – first place	2017 Budapest	Ribbon
Gold medal – first place	2019 Baku	Team
Gold medal – first place	2019 Baku	Hoop
Gold medal – first place	2019 Baku	Ribbon
Gold medal – first place	2021 Varna	Team
Gold medal – first place	2021 Varna	Hoop
Gold medal – first place	2021 Varna	Ball
Gold medal – first place	2021 Varna	Ribbon
Silver medal – second place	2017 Budapest	Clubs
Silver medal – second place	2018 Guadalajara	All-around
Silver medal – second place	2019 Baku	Clubs
Silver medal – second place	2021 Varna	Clubs
Bronze medal – third place	2021 Varna	All-around
European Games
Gold medal – first place	2019 Minsk	All-around
Gold medal – first place	2019 Minsk	Hoop
Gold medal – first place	2019 Minsk	Ribbon
Silver medal – second place	2019 Minsk	Clubs
Bronze medal – third place	2019 Minsk	Ball
World Games
Gold medal – first place	2017 Wroclaw	Clubs
Silver medal – second place	2017 Wroclaw	Ribbon
Silver medal – second place	2017 Wroclaw	Hoop
Silver medal – second place	2017 Wroclaw	Ball
Grand Prix Final
Silver medal – second place	2016 Eilat	All-around
Silver medal – second place	2016 Eilat	Ball

Dina Alekseyevna Averina (Russian: Дина Алексеевна Аверина, IPA: [ˈdʲinə ɐˈvʲerʲɪnə]; born 13 August 1998) is a Russian former individual rhythmic gymnast. She was the 2020 Olympic All-around silver medalist, the only four-time (2021, 2019, 2018, 2017) World All-around Champion, the 2018 silver and 2021 European All-around bronze medalist and the 2016 Grand Prix Final All-around silver medalist.

On a national level, she was the 2017, 2018 and 2022 Russian National All-around champion and the 2013 Russian Junior All-around bronze medalist. Her identical twin sister, Arina Averina, was also a competitive rhythmic gymnast.

== Personal life ==
Born to parents Ksenia Averina and Alexey Averin, Dina and identical twin sister Arina started gymnastics at four years old. The girls were born on 13 August 1998. Arina was born 20 minutes ahead of Dina, while both have moles on the upper cheekbone (near the right ear), Dina has it on the lower right compared to Arina's upper right. Arina has a scar above her right eye, caused after an accident with a club.

In 2020, Averina sustained a serious back injury that required surgery; however, she chose to postpone the procedure in order to prepare for the rescheduled Olympic Games. As a result, she limited the body difficulty of her routines to avoid further aggravating the injury. She announced her retirement from competitive sport in February 2024. In April 2024, she underwent wrist surgery.

On 18 March 2022, Dina, as well as her sister Arina, participated in the Moscow rally in support of the Russian invasion of Ukraine.

In 2025, she started dating Russian figure skater Dmitri Soloviev. They got married on July 7th, at a private ceremony in Moscow. On June 6, 2026 the couple announced that they are expecting their first child together. On August 26, she gave birth to a baby boy, Lyova.

== Career ==
=== Junior ===
The Averinas first trained under their first coach Larisa Belova until they became members of the Russian national team and began training in Olympic Training Center in Moscow where they were coached by Vera Shatalina.

The Averinas began appearing in international competitions in 2011 competing at the 2011 Russian-Chinese Youth Games where Averina won the gold and Arina finishing 5th in the all-around. In 2012, Averina finished 4th at the Russian Junior Championships. Averina and Arina both competed at the Venera Cup in Eilat, Israel where Averina won the all-around gold, she also won gold in hoop and silver medals in ball, clubs and ribbon. She then competed at International MTM Cup in Ljubljana (along with teammates Aleksandra Soldatova and Arina Averina) won the Team gold medal.

In 2013 season, Averina won bronze in all-around at the 2013 Russian Junior Championships behind Soldatova, she competed in Junior division at Happy Caravan Cup in Tashkent and won Team gold with Arina Averina. At the 2013 Russian Spartakiada's 6th Summer Student Games, Averina won the all-around bronze medal.

=== Senior ===
==== 2014 ====
In 2014 season, Averina debuted at the 2014 Moscow Grand Prix competing in the senior international tournament division. Averina appeared in her first World Cup competition at the 2014 Lisboa World Cup where she won the all-around bronze medal behind Melitina Staniouta. In the event finals: she won silver in clubs and bronze in ribbon. On 23–27 April, Averina competed in senior nationals at the 2014 Russian Championships where she finished 6th in the all-around.

==== 2015 ====
In 2015 season, Averina started her season at the 2015 Moscow Grand Prix, she then competed at the Corbeil-Essonnes International Rhythmic Gymnastics Tournament where she won the all-around silver medal behind twin sister Arina Averina, she qualified to 4 event finals, taking gold in ribbon (tied with Arina), silver medals in hoop, ball and placed 6th in clubs. On 7–9 August, Averina competed at the MTK Budapest taking gold in the all-around, hoop, ball, clubs and a silver in ribbon. Averina followed another gold medal win in the all-around at the 2015 Dundee International Tournament in Sofia, ahead of twin sister Arina. She won bronze medal at the 2015 Russian Championships behind Yana Kudryavtseva and Arina Averina.

==== 2016 ====
In 2016, Averina began her season competing at the 2016 Grand Prix Moscow finishing 6th in the all-around and qualified to the hoop final. On 26–28 February, Averina competed in the first World Cup of the season at the 2016 Espoo World Cup finishing 6th in the all-around; she won bronze in ball, placed 4th in hoop, clubs and 6th in ribbon. Averina then competed in the senior division at the International tournament in Lisbon where she won the all-around gold and all apparatus finals. At the 30th Thiais Grand Prix event in Paris, Averina finished 9th in the all-around. On 1–3 April, Averina competed at the 2016 Pesaro World Cup where she finished 5th in the all-around with a total of 73.500 points, she qualified in all apparatus after teammate Yana Kudryavtseva withdrew from the event finals, Averina won silver in ball, ribbon and bronze in hoop, clubs. Averina won the all-around bronze at the 2016 Russian Championships held in Sochi. On 6–8 May, Averina competed at the Brno Grand Prix taking bronze in the all-around with a total of 72.850 points; she qualified to 3 apparatus taking silver in hoop, ribbon and placed 4th in clubs. On 13–15 May, Averina won the all-around bronze at the Bucharest Grand Prix with a total of 73.100 points, she qualified to all apparatus finals: taking silver in clubs behind Salome Pazhava, bronze in hoop, ball (tied with Katsiaryna Halkina) and 7th in ribbon. On 27–29 May, Averina finished 5th in the all-around at the 2016 Sofia World Cup with a total of 72.900 points, she qualified in hoop finals placing 4th behind sister Arina Averina. On 1–3 July, Dina competed at the 2016 Berlin World Cup where she won the All-around gold medal with a total of 74.050 points, she qualified to all apparatus taking gold in Ball, Ribbon, placed 4th in Hoop and 8th in Clubs. On 22–24 September, Averina competed at the 2016 Grand Prix Final in Eilat, Israel where she won the all-around bronze medal with a new personal best total of 74.450 points, she qualified in 2 apparatus finals taking silver medal in ball and placed 5th in clubs.

==== 2017: First World Title ====
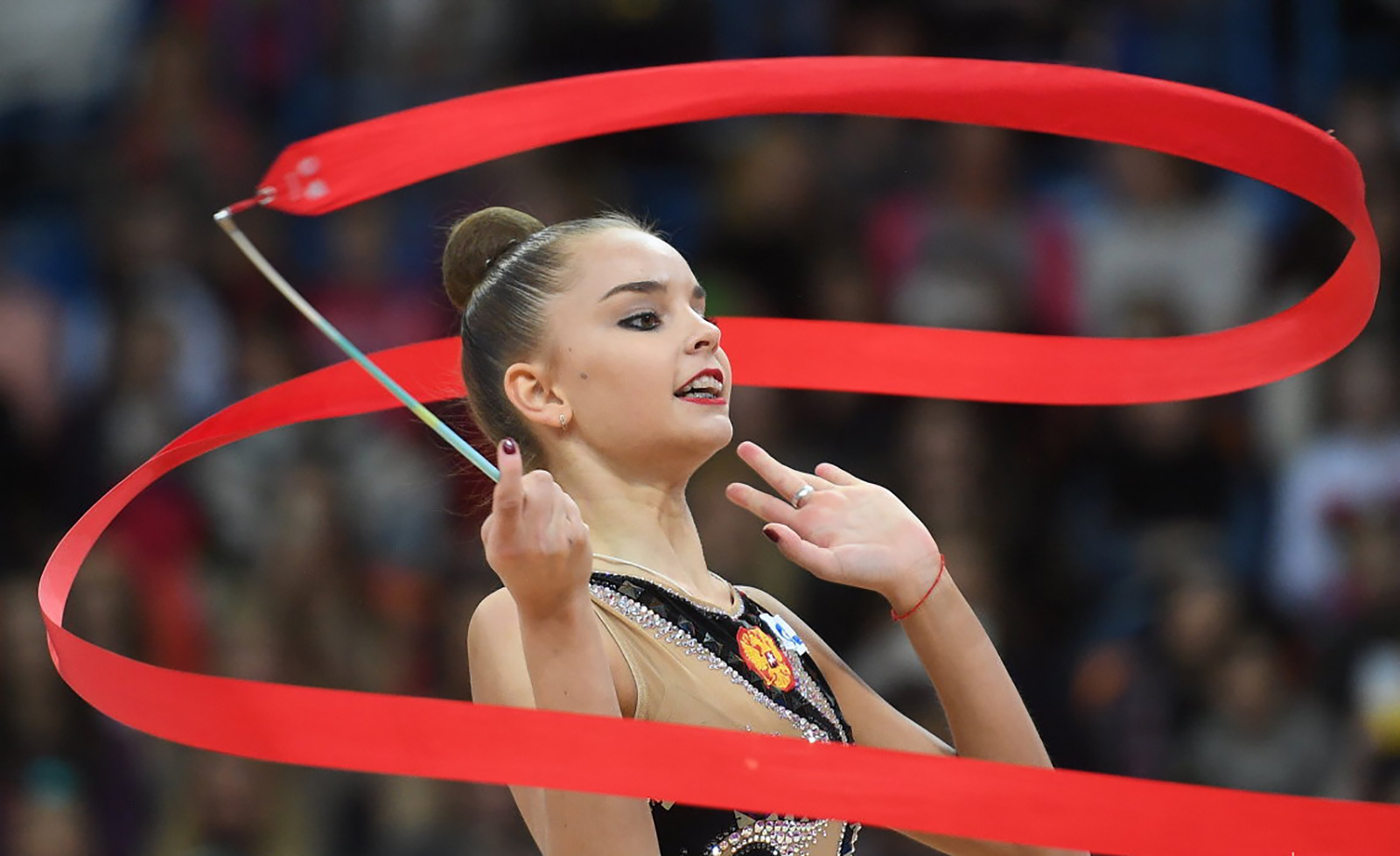
A close-up shot of Dina Averina, at the 2017 Grand Prix Moscow performing her ribbon routine

In 2017, Averina's season began in competition at the 2017 Grand Prix Moscow where she won the all-around gold medal with a new personal best total score of 76.050 points, she qualified to all the apparatus finals taking gold in hoop, clubs, ribbon and a silver medal in ball behind Aleksandra Soldatova. Averina then participated in the organized Desio-Italia Trophy where she won the All-around and team gold medal (together with Twin Sister Arina). On 10–12 March, Averina became the All-around champion at the 2017 Russian Championships ahead of defending champion Aleksandra Soldatova who finished in 2nd place respectively. On 24–26 March, Averina then competed at the Thiais Grand Prix where she won the all-around gold with a total of 74.500 points, she qualified to all the event finals taking gold in hoop, ball, clubs and silver in ribbon. On 7–9 April, Averina competed in the first World Cup of the season at the 2017 Pesaro World Cup where she won silver in the all-around behind teammate Aleksandra Soldatova, she qualified to all the apparatus finals winning 3 gold medals in ball, clubs, ribbon and a silver in hoop. Her next event was at the 2017 Tashkent World Cup where Averina won gold in the all-around ahead of sister Arina Averina, she qualified to all the apparatus finals taking gold in clubs, and 3 silver medals in ball, hoop and ribbon. On 19–21 May, at the 2017 European Championships in Budapest, Hungary, Averina was member of the Golden winning Russian Team (together with senior individuals: twin sister Arina Averina, Aleksandra Soldatova and the junior group) scoring a total of 182.175 points which was more than 11 points ahead of their nearest competitor team Belarus. Averina qualified to 3 apparatus finals taking 2 gold medals in hoop, ribbon and a silver medal in clubs behind Arina Averina. On 23–26 June, Averina then competed at the 2017 Holon Grand Prix taking silver in the all-around behind Arina, she qualified 3 apparatus finals winning gold in ball, silver in clubs and placed 6th in hoop. At the quadrennial 2017 World Games which was held in Wrocław, Poland from 20 to 30 July, Averina won the gold medal in clubs and three silver medals in hoop, ball, ribbon. On 11–13 August, Averina competed at the 2017 Kazan World Challenge Cup and won the all-around gold medal edging out sister Arina who won the silver medal, Averina qualified in all the apparatus finals and won 2 gold medals in hoop, clubs, a silver in ribbon and finished 8th in ball. At the 2017 World Championships held on 30 August – 3 September in Pesaro, Italy, in the first day of the apparatus finals; Averina won Gold in Hoop (19.100) and Silver in Ball (18.700). The following day, she won another Gold in Clubs (19.000) and Silver in Ribbon (17.200). During the individual all-around finals, she accumulated scores in (Hoop: 18.850, Ball: 18.550, Clubs: 18.850, Ribbon: 18.450) scoring a total of 74.700 points to become the new All-around Champion edging out twin sister Arina Averina who took the silver medal respectively.

==== 2018: Second AA World title ====
In 2018, Averina's season began in competition at the 2018 Grand Prix Moscow, where she won the all-around gold, she qualified to 3 apparatus finals taking gold with hoop, clubs and silver with ball. On 24–25 March, Averina took gold in the all-around at the 2018 Thiais Grand Prix; she qualified in 3 apparatus finals where she won gold in ball, ribbon and silver in clubs. On 13–15 April, Averina then competed at the 2018 Pesaro World Cup, winning gold in the all-around; in the event finals, she won gold in ball and clubs, a silver in hoop and placed 4th in ribbon. She competed at the 2018 World Championships in Sofia, winning Gold in the All-Around, Hoop, Ball and Clubs.

==== 2019 ====
Averina won gold in team, hoop and ribbon at the 2019 European Championships. She also competed at the 2019 European Games, winning gold in all-around, hoop and ribbon, silver in clubs and bronze in ball. At the 2019 World Championships in Baku, she won the All-Around Gold for the third year in a row, as well as gold in the ball, clubs and ribbon final and bronze in the hoop final. She also won Team Gold, together with Ekaterina Selezneva and her sister Arina Averina.

==== 2021: Controversial Silver at Tokyo Olympics ====
Averina started the season at the Moscow Grand Prix, where she won gold ahead of her silver and bronze compatriots Arina Averina and Lala Kramarenko. In the finals of apparatus, she won gold in ball and ribbon, silver in hoop and bronze in clubs. At the Tashkent World Cup, she also won gold ahead of Arina Averina and Anastasiia Salos, and gold on hoop, silver on ball and clubs, and bronze on ribbon in the finals. In the Pesaro World Cup, she also achieved full gold ahead of Arina Averina and Alina Harnasko, and in the finals, she achieved gold in hoop, silver in ball and ribbon, and bronze in clubs. From 9–13 June, she competed in the European Rhythmic Gymnastics Championships, in Varna, Bulgaria, achieving bronze in the all around final, behind Boryana Kaleyn, and in the apparatus finals she achieved gold in hoop, ball and ribbon, and silver in clubs. She, along with Lala Kramarenko, Arina Averina, and the Russian group, they achieved first place. At the Moscow Challenge World Cup, the last competition prior to the Olympic Games, she achieved all around gold ahead of Lala Kramarenko and Ekaterina Vedeneeva, and took gold in all apparatus finals. Her sister Arina, was removed from the competition list the day before, and was replaced by Kramarenko.

At the 2020 Tokyo Olympics, Averina was the top qualifier, ahead of her sister Arina Averina who was second. In the all around final, Averina lost to Linoy Ashram from Israel and finished second with a silver medal, with a total score of 107.650. Thus, Russia finished for the first time without a gold medal in the sport since 1996. The results of the competition were controversial, mainly because Ashram had a drop in her ribbon routine. The ROC and the head coach of the Russian team, Irina Viner accused the judges of bias towards Linoy Ashram and called the results an "injustice". They also requested several inquiries during the all-around final.

The Russian Olympic Committee (ROC) officially launched a complaint to the International Gymnastics Federation (FIG) over the all-around rhythmic result at Tokyo 2020, with a Foreign Ministry spokeswoman calling the outcome a "forgery". The FIG responded to this, stating that "Following this process, we can confirm that no bias or irregularities were identified in the judging panels." and that "The FIG has set up strict criteria for objective selection of the most qualified and unbiased judges for the Olympic Games and we are pleased by their work." Ashram was the first non-Russian gymnast to win the gold since Ukraine's Ekaterina Serebrianskaya at Atlanta 1996.

==== After the Olympic Games ====
Later, the Averina twins returned to competition after the Olympic Games with their new coach Yulia Barsukova, at the international Olympico Cup tournament in Moscow, where Averina launched a new club routine, and her sister a new club and ribbon routine. Averina was champion ahead of Arina Averina and Elzhana Taniyeva. Averina competed in the Rhythmic Gymnastics World Championships in Kitakyushu, Japan, where in the apparatus finals she won gold in hoop, ball and clubs, and in ribbon she won silver, surpassed by Alina Harnasko. In the all-around final, Averina again took the all-around gold and the title of World Champion for the fourth time in a row, becoming the gymnast with the most world titles (Beating the record of Maria Gigova, Maria Petrova, Evgenia Kanaeva, and Yana Kudryatseva). She also achieved team gold with Arina Averina and the Russian Group. She and her sister kept competing (although limited due to the FIG ban on Russian Belarusian athletes due to the Invasion of Ukraine) until 2023.

==== 2024 Retirement from the Sport ====
On February 23, 2024, Averina (exactly like her sister Arina) announced her retirement from sports.

== Gymnastics technique ==
Averina is known for her fast routines and dynamic apparatus handling. She has maintained a Difficulty value of 10 which was scored in her clubs routine; the last rhythmic gymnast before Averina to score a 10 in Difficulty was Evgenia Kanaeva.

== Routine music information ==
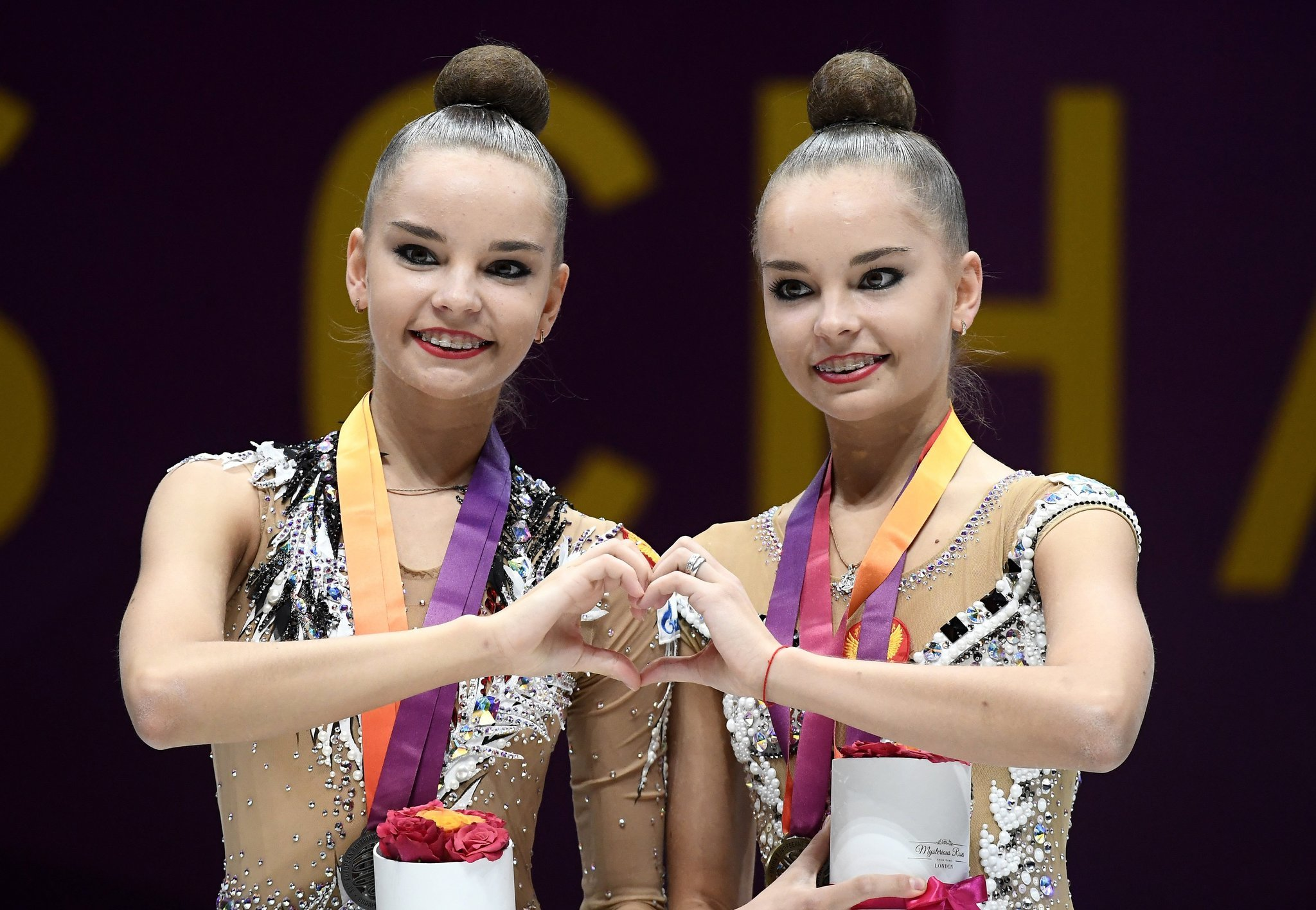
Averina with Arina at the 2017 European Championships podium.

Year	Apparatus	Music title
2023	Hoop	"Butterflies and Hurricanes" by Muse
2023	Ball	"Toxic" by 2WEI
2023	Clubs	"Bolero"
2023	Ribbon	
2022	Hoop	"How You Like That" by Blackpink
2022	Ball (first)	"So Far" by Ólafur Arnalds feat. Arnór Dan Arnarson
2022	Ball (second)	A Life for the Tsar: Final Chorus "Slav'sya" as composed by Mikhail Glinka, conducted by Peter Feranec
2022	Ball (third)	"lovely" by Billie Eilish, Khalid
2022	Clubs	"Ritmo de Bom Bom/Samba Vocalizado" by Jubaba/Luciano Perrone
2022	Ribbon	String Quartet No. 8 in C Minor Op. 110: II. Allegro Molto as composed by Dmitri Shostakovich
2021	Hoop	"Thunderstruck" by David Garrett
2021	Ball	"Symphony No. 6 in B minor, Op. 74" by Pyotr Tchaikovsky
2021	Clubs	"FOGO" by Garmiani feat. Julimar Santos
2021	Clubs (second)	"Call Me Mother" by RuPaul
2021	Ribbon	"La Cumparsita" by Yasmin Levy
2021	Gala	"you should see me in a crown" by Billie Eilish
2020	Hoop (first)	Fantasie Brillante sur Gounod's "Faust", Op. 20 by Henryk Wieniawski
2020	Hoop (second)	"Thunderstruck" by David Garrett
2020	Ball (first)	"L'Adoration De La Terre", "Le Sacrifice" from The Rite of Spring as composed by Igor Stravinsky
2020	Ball (second)	Symphony No. 6 in B minor, Op. 74 as composed by Pyotr Ilyich Tchaikovsky
2020	Clubs (first)	"Chiquito" by Los Chiquitos
2020	Clubs (second)	"Двигаться", "Kick It (Stephan F Trumpet Remix)", "Breaking it Down" by Raim, Village Girls, Rockin' Nation
2020	Clubs (third)	"FOGO" by Garmiani feat. Julimar Santos
2020	Ribbon	"La Cumparsita" by Yasmin Levy
2020	Gala (Grand Prix Moscow)	"Time, Forward!" by Alexander Vedernikov & Russian Philharmonic Symphony Orchestra, composed by Georgy Sviridov
2020	Gala	"Lash Out" by Alice Merton
2019	Hoop	Piano Concerto No.1 in B Flat Minor: 3rd Movement by Maksim Mvrica
2019	Ball	Polovetsian Dances by Alexander Borodin
2019	Clubs	Baladi Asena, Vostochnie Skazki by Asena, Arash
2019	Ribbon	Un Vie D'amour by Charles Aznavour & Mireille Mathieu
2019	Gala	"Lash Out" by Alice Merton
2019	Gala (Euskalgym)	"Call Me Mother" by RuPaul
2018	Hoop	"Spartacus", composed by Aram Khachaturian by Royal Philharmonic Orchestra, Yuri Simonov
2018	Ball	"Petrushka - The Shrovetide Fair", composed by Igor Stravinsky by Philharmonia Slavonica & Hanspeter Gmür
2018	Clubs	"Hey! Pachuco!" from The Mask (film) by Royal Crown Revue
2018	Ribbon (first)	"Concerto No. 1 in G for Cello and Orchestra, Op. 49: I. Allegro" by Yo-Yo Ma, Dmitri Kabalevsky & Dmitry Shostakovich
2018	Ribbon (second)	"Kalinka" by Nikolay Baskov
2018	Gala	"Call Me Mother" by RuPaul
2017	Hoop	"Swan Lake (Act IV Allegro)" by Smolensk Symphonic Orchestra
2017	Ball	"Volare", from Circus album by DJ BoBo
2017	Clubs	"Unharness The Horses, Lads (Ukrainian folk)" by Kuban Cossack Choir
2017	Ribbon	"Dance of the Basques" from Flames of Paris by Boris Asafyev
2017	Gala (first)	"Me Too" by Meghan Trainor
2017	Gala (second)	"The Firebird" by Igor Stravinsky
2016	Hoop	"One Thousand and One Nights" from Scheherazade
2016	Ball	"Zima" by Eduard Khil
2016	Clubs	"Caravan" by Antonella Ruggiero
2016	Ribbon	"Tsigany" by Moiseyev Dance Ensemble
2015	Hoop	"Giselle, Act I: No. 8, Waltz" by Pyotr Tchaikovsky
2015	Ball	"Zima" by Eduard Khil
2015	Clubs	"Kalinka" by André Rieu
2015	Ribbon	"Tsigany" by Moiseyev Dance Ensemble
2014	Hoop	"Song about Bears (Песня о Медведях)" by Alsou
2014	Ball	"Jamaica" by Vitas
2014	Clubs	"Ciocârlia (Romanian folk tune)" by George Enescu
2014	Ribbon	"Sabre Dance" by Aram Khachaturian

== Detailed Olympic results ==
Year	Competition Description	Location	Music	Apparatus	Rank-Final	Score-Final	Rank-Qualifying	Score-Qualifying
2020	Olympics	Tokyo		All-around	2nd	107.650	1st	106.300
2020	Olympics	Tokyo	"Thunderstruck" by David Garrett	Hoop	2nd	27.200	1st	27.625
2020	Olympics	Tokyo	"Symphony No. 6 in B minor, Op. 74" by Pyotr Tchaikovsky	Ball	1st	28.300	2nd	27.600
2020	Olympics	Tokyo	"FOGO" by Garmiani feat. Julimar Santos	Clubs	2nd	28.150	1st	28.275
2020	Olympics	Tokyo	"La Cumparsita" by Yasmin Levy	Ribbon	1st	24.000	3rd	22.800

== Competitive highlights ==
(Team competitions in seniors are held only at the World Championships, Europeans and other Continental Games.)

International: Senior
Year	Event	AA	Team	Hoop	Ball	Clubs	Ribbon
2023	1st Stage Strongest Cup	3rd		DNS	DNS	DNS	DNS
2022	Spartakiad	2nd					
2022	Crystal Rose	5th	1st	6th (Q)	3rd	5th (Q)	4th
2022	1st Stage Strongest Cup	1st		2nd	2nd	2nd	1st
2022	Grand Prix Moscow	1st		1st	3rd (Q)	3rd	1st
2021	World Championships	1st	1st	1st	1st	1st	2nd
2021	Olympico Cup	1st		2nd	1st	2nd	2nd
2021	Olympic Games	2nd					
2021	World Cup Moscow	1st		1st	1st	1st	1st
2021	European Championships	3rd	1st	1st	1st	2nd	1st
2021	World Cup Pesaro	1st		1st	2nd	3rd	2nd
2021	World Cup Tashkent	1st		1st	2nd	2nd	3rd
2021	International Online Tournament (Finnish Gymnastics Federation)	1st					
2021	Schmiden Gymnastik International Online	1st					
2021	Grand Prix Moscow	1st		2nd	1st	3rd	1st
2020	3rd International Online Tournament (Russian Rhythmic Gymnastics Federation)	1st		2nd (Q)	2nd (Q)	1st	1st
2020	2nd International Online Tournament (Russian Rhythmic Gymnastics Federation)	1st		2nd (Q)	1st	1st	2nd (Q)
2020	Russia-Belarus Friendly Match	1st					
2020	Grand Prix Moscow	1st		4th (Q)	1st	2nd	1st
2019	Aeon Cup	1st	1st				
2019	World Championships	1st	1st	3rd	1st	1st	1st
2019	World Cup Kazan	1st		2nd	1st	1st	1st
2019	World Cup Minsk	1st		3rd	1st	1st	1st
2019	European Games	1st		1st	3rd	2nd	1st
2019	European Championships		1st	1st		2nd	1st
2019	World Cup Baku	1st		1st	2nd	1st	3rd
2019	World Cup Pesaro	1st		2nd	3rd	1st	1st
2019	Grand Prix Thiais	3rd		5th (Q)	4th (Q)	1st	1st
2019	Grand Prix Marbella	1st		2nd	1st	3rd	2nd
2019	Grand Prix Moscow	1st		1st	1st	2nd	2nd
2018	Aeon Cup	1st	1st				
2018	World Championships	1st	1st	1st	1st	1st	
2018	World Cup Kazan	2nd		1st	1st	1st	1st
2018	European Championships	2nd	NT				
2018	World Cup Pesaro	1st		2nd	1st	4th	1st
2018	Grand Prix Thiais	1st		6th (Q)	1st	2nd	1st
2018	Grand Prix Moscow	1st		1st	2nd	1st	5th (Q)
2017	Aeon Cup	1st	1st				
2017	World Championships	1st	NT	1st	2nd	1st	2nd
2017	World Cup Kazan	1st		1st	8th	1st	2nd
2017	World Games			2nd	2nd	1st	2nd
2017	Grand Prix Holon	2nd		6th	1st	2nd	3rd (Q)
2017	European Championships		1st	1st		2nd	1st
2017	World Cup Tashkent	1st		2nd	2nd	1st	2nd
2017	World Cup Pesaro	2nd		2nd	1st	1st	1st
2017	Grand Prix Thiais	1st		1st	1st	1st	2nd
2017	Desio Italia Trophy	1st	1st				
2017	Grand Prix Moscow	1st		1st	2nd	1st	1st
2016	Dalia Kutkaite Cup	1st					
2016	Grand Prix Final: Eilat	2nd		3rd (Q)	2nd	5th	3rd (Q)
2016	World Cup Berlin	1st		4th	1st	8th	1st
2016	World Cup Sofia	5th		4th	5th (Q)	4th (Q)	7th (Q)
2016	Grand Prix Bucharest	3rd		3rd	3rd	2nd	7th
2016	Grand Prix Brno	3rd		2nd	9th (Q)	4th	2nd
2016	World Cup Pesaro	5th		3rd	2nd	3rd	2nd
2016	Grand Prix Thiais	9th		18th (Q)	4th (Q)	11th (Q)	5th (Q)
2016	International Tournament of Lisbon	1st		1st	1st	1st	1st
2016	World Cup Espoo	6th		4th	2nd	4th	6th
2016	Grand Prix Moscow	6th		6th	4th (Q)	12th (Q)	5th (Q)
2015	Dundee Cup	1st					
2015	MTK Budapest Cup	1st		1st	1st	1st	2nd
2015	Corbeil-Essonnes International	2nd		2nd	2nd	6th	1st
2015	International Tournament of Pesaro		1st	1st		1st	
2014	EWUB Luxembourg Trophy	1st		1st			1st
2014	World Cup Lisbon	3rd		4th	6th	2nd	3rd
2014	Holon International Tournament	2nd (OC)		2nd (OC)	2nd (OC)	1st	3rd (OC)
2014	Alina International Tournament	1st					
International: Junior
Year	Event	AA	Team	Hoop	Ball	Clubs	Ribbon
2013	Happy Caravan Cup		1st			1st	
2012	MTM Ljubljana		1st				
2012	Venera Cup	1st		2nd	1st	2nd	2nd
2012	Junior Grand Prix Moscow		4th (OC)				
2011	Russian-Chinese Youth Games	1st					
National
Year	Event	AA	Team	Hoop	Ball	Clubs	Ribbon
2022	Russian Championships	1st	2nd	1st	11th	DNS	DNS
2021	Russian Championships	3rd	3rd	3rd	2nd	1st	3rd
2020	Russian Championships	3rd	2nd				
2019	Russian Championships	2nd	2nd				
2018	Russian Championships	1st	1st				
2017	Russian Championships	1st	1st				
2016	Russian Championships	3rd	1st	2nd	3rd	4th	2nd
2015	Russian Championships	3rd	1st	2nd	1st	6th	3rd
2014	Russian Championships	6th	1st	2nd	6th	4th	3rd
2013	Russian Junior Championships	3rd					
2012	Russian Junior Championships	4th					
2011	Russian Junior Championships	6th					
Q = Qualifications (Did not advance to Event Final due to the 2 gymnast per country rule, only Top 8 highest score); WR = World Record; WD = Withdrew; NT = No Team Competition; OC = Out of Competition (competed but scores not counted for qualifications/results)

== See also ==
- Arina Averina
