= Arina Averina =

Russian rhythmic gymnast (born 1998)

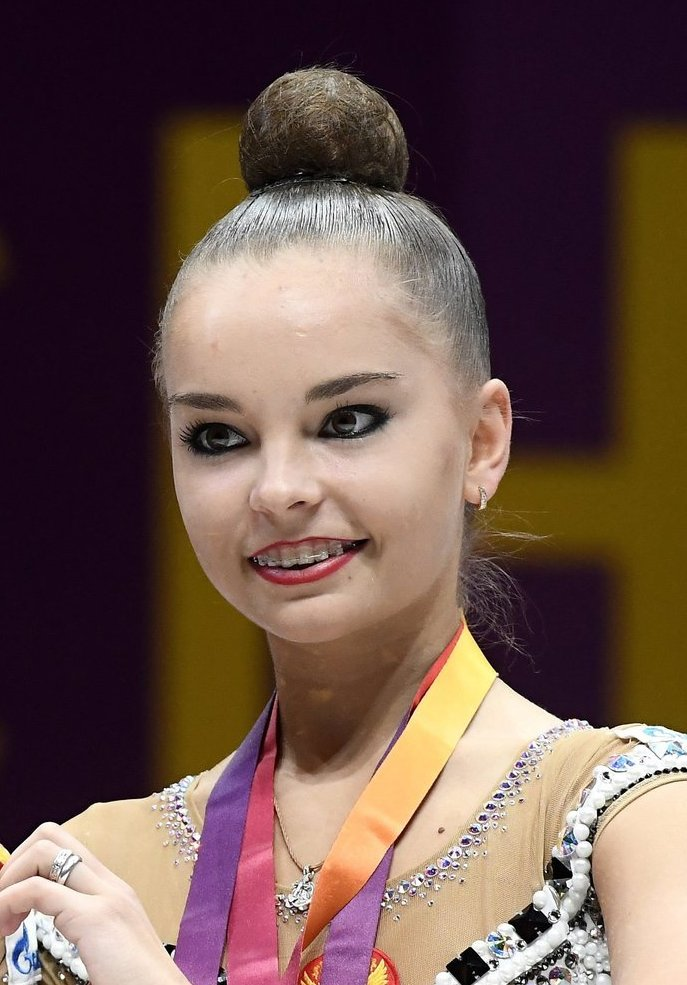
- Arina Averina at the 2017 European Championships

Personal information
- Full name: Arina Alexeevna Averina
- Nicknames: Tiger cub, Arisha
- Born: 13 August 1998 (age 28) Zavolzhye, Nizhny Novgorod Oblast

Gymnastics career
- Country represented: Russia
- Club: CSKA
- Head coach: Irina Viner
- Assistant coach: Yulia Barsukova
- Former coach: Vera Shatalina Larisa Belova
- Choreographer: Irina Zenovka, Tatiana Pomerantseva
- Retired: 2024
- World ranking: 6 WC (2019); 14 WC 13 WCC (2018); 2 WC 13 WCC (2017); 12 (2016)
Medal record
Rhythmic Gymnastics
Representing Russia and RGF
Event	1st	2nd	3rd
World Championships	5	6	5
European Championships	9	0	1
Grand Prix Final	3	3	1
World Games	3	0	1
Total	20	9	8
World Championships
Gold medal – first place	2017 Pesaro	Ball
Gold medal – first place	2017 Pesaro	Ribbon
Gold medal – first place	2018 Sofia	Team
Gold medal – first place	2019 Baku	Team
Gold medal – first place	2021 Kitakyushu	Team
Silver medal – second place	2017 Pesaro	All-around
Silver medal – second place	2017 Pesaro	Hoop
Silver medal – second place	2019 Baku	Ball
Silver medal – second place	2019 Baku	All-around
Silver medal – second place	2021 Kitakyushu	Ball
Silver medal – second place	2021 Kitakyushu	Clubs
Bronze medal – third place	2017 Pesaro	Clubs
Bronze medal – third place	2018 Sofia	Hoop
Bronze medal – third place	2018 Sofia	Clubs
Bronze medal – third place	2021 Kitakyushu	Ribbon
Bronze medal – third place	2021 Kitakyushu	All-around
European Championships
Gold medal – first place	2017 Budapest	Team
Gold medal – first place	2017 Budapest	Ball
Gold medal – first place	2017 Budapest	Clubs
Gold medal – first place	2018 Guadalajara	All-around
Gold medal – first place	2019 Baku	Team
Gold medal – first place	2019 Baku	Ball
Gold medal – first place	2019 Baku	Clubs
Gold medal – first place	2021 Varna	All-around
Gold medal – first place	2021 Varna	Team
Bronze medal – third place	2021 Varna	Ribbon
Grand Prix Final
Gold medal – first place	2019 Brno	Ball
Gold medal – first place	2019 Brno	Hoop
Gold medal – first place	2019 Brno	Ribbon
Silver medal – second place	2016 Eilat	Ribbon
Silver medal – second place	2016 Eilat	Hoop
Silver medal – second place	2019 Brno	All-around
Bronze medal – third place	2016 Eilat	All-around
World Games
Gold medal – first place	2017 Wroclaw	Hoop
Gold medal – first place	2017 Wroclaw	Ball
Gold medal – first place	2017 Wroclaw	Ribbon
Bronze medal – third place	2017 Wroclaw	Clubs

Arina Alekseyevna Averina (Russian: Арина Алексеевна Аверина; born 13 August 1998) is a Russian former individual rhythmic gymnast. She was a 2020 Summer Olympics finalist, a two-time (2017, 2019) world all-around silver medalist, a two-time European all-around champion (2018, 2021) and the 2016 Grand Prix Final all-around bronze medalist. She was a three-time (2019–2021) Russian national all-around champion and a three-time (2015, 2017, 2022) Russian national all-around medalist. Her identical twin sister, Dina Averina, was also a competitive rhythmic gymnast.

== Personal life ==
Arina Averina was born to Ksenia Averina and her husband Alexey Averin on August 13, 1998, twenty minutes before her identical twin sister Dina. The twins began gymnastic training at the age of four. Arina‘s mole on her right cheekbone near her ear is slightly higher than her sister Dina’s. A scar above Arina‘s right eye is the result of an accident with a club.

On 18 March 2022, Averina, as well as her sister, participated in the Moscow rally in support of the Russian invasion of Ukraine.

Since 2025, she has been dating Russian figure skater Dmitriy Aliev.

== Career ==
=== Junior ===
The Averina twins trained under their first coach Larisa Belova until they became members of the Russian national team.

The Averinas began appearing in international competitions in 2011. They competed at the 2011 Russian-Chinese Youth Games, where Arina finished 5th in the all-around and Dina won the all-around gold medal. In 2012, Arina finished 11th at the Russian Junior Championships. Arina and Dina both competed at the Venera Cup in Eilat, Israel where Arina won bronze in the all-around; she also took silver in hoop and bronze medals in ball, clubs, and ribbon.

In 2013, Arina finished 5th at the 2013 Russian Junior Championships. She competed in the Junior division at the Happy Caravan Cup in Tashkent and won Team gold with Dina Averina. At the 2013 Russian Spartakiada's 6th Summer Student Games, Arina won the all-around silver medal.

=== Senior ===
==== 2014 ====
In 2014 Season, Arina debuted at the 2014 Moscow Grand Prix competing in the senior international tournament division where she won the all-around silver medal behind her twin sister Dina . Arina then competed at the 2014 Grand Prix Holon international tournament and won the all-around gold. Her next competition was at the 2014 Baltic Hoop where she won the all-around silver behind Aleksandra Soldatova. In the event finals: she won gold in ball, 2 silver medals (clubs, ribbon) and bronze in hoop.

==== 2015 ====
In 2015 season, Arina started her season at the 2015 Moscow Grand Prix. she then competed at the Corbeil-Essonnes International Rhythmic Gymnastics Tournament where she won the all-around gold medal ahead of twin sister Dina Averina, she won gold in all 4 of the event finals (hoop, ball, clubs, ribbon). On August 7–9, Arina competed at the MTK Budapest placing 3rd in the all-around behind Maria Titova. In apparatus finals, she won a silver in ball and bronze in hoop.

==== 2016 ====
In 2016, Arina began her season competing at the 2016 Grand Prix Moscow taking third place in the all-around, in apparatus finals: she won gold in ribbon and silver in clubs. On March 17–20, Arina then competed at the 2016 Lisboa World Cup where she finished 5th in the all-around with a total of 70.400 points, she qualified 2 event finals taking silver in ribbon (tied with teammate Aleksandra Soldatova) and placed 4th in ball. At the 30th Thiais Grand Prix event in Paris, Arina finished 5th in the all-around and qualified 2 apparatus finals finishing 4th in clubs and ribbon. Arina finished 4th in the all-around at the 2016 Russian Championships held in Sochi. On May 6–8, Arina competed at the Brno Grand Prix where she finished 5th in the all-around behind Victoria Veinberg Filanovsky. On May 13–15, Arina won the all-around silver at the Bucharest Grand Prix with a total of 73.600 points, she qualified to all apparatus finals: taking silver in ball, bronze in clubs, ribbon and 4th in hoop. On May 27–29, Arina finished 4th in the all-around at the 2016 Sofia World Cup with a total of 73.450 points, she qualified to all apparatus finals and won bronze in hoop, clubs, placed 4th in ball, 7th in ribbon. On July 1–3, Arina competed at the 2016 Berlin World Cup however, she withdrew after the first day of qualifications because she suffered a hand injury.

==== 2017 ====
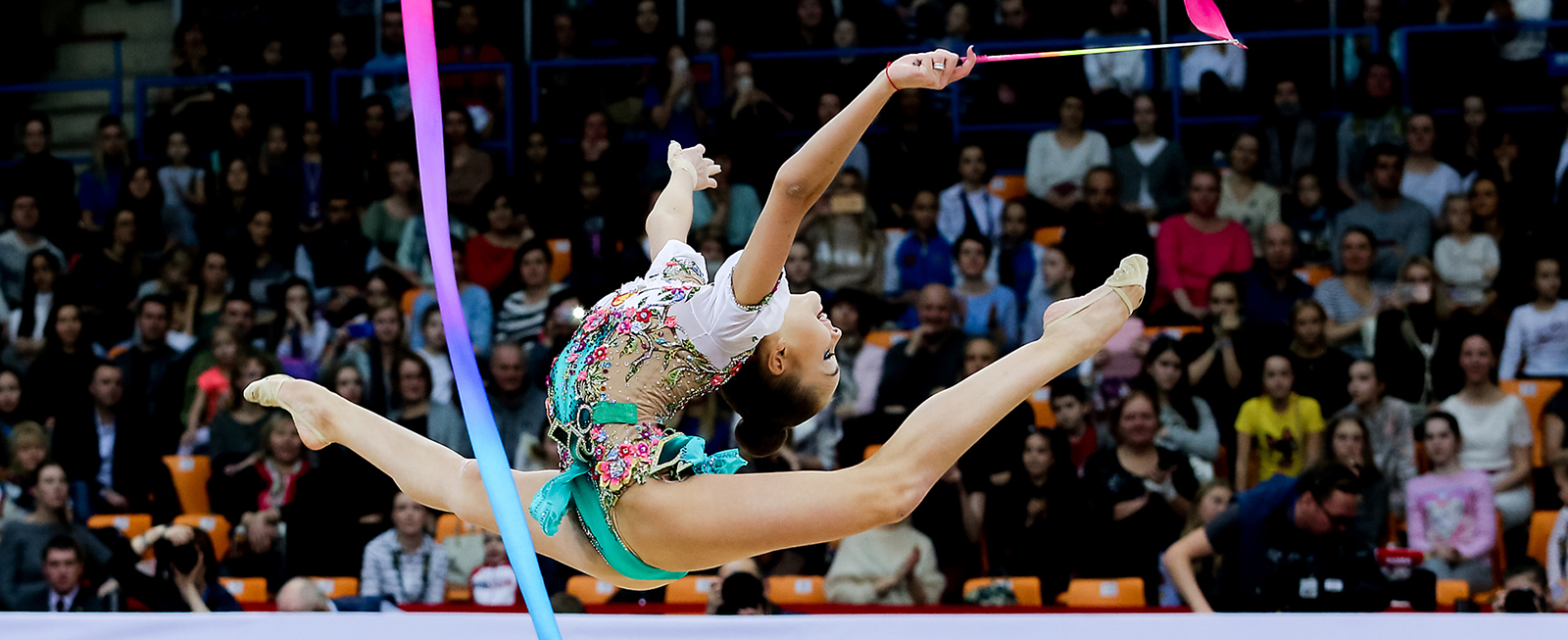
Arina at the 2017 Grand Prix Moscow

In 2017, Arina's season began in competition at the 2017 Grand Prix Moscow where she won the all-around bronze medal, she qualified to 1 apparatus final winning the silver medal in ribbon behind her twin sister Dina. Arina then participated in the organized Desio-Italia Trophy where she won silver in the all-around and team gold medal (together with Twin Sister Dina). On March 10–12, Arina won the all-around bronze medal at the 2017 Russian Championships behind Aleksandra Soldatova. On March 31 - April 2, Arina competed at the 2017 Grand Prix Marbella where she won silver in the all-around, she won 2 bronze medals in the ball and clubs. On April 21–23, Arina competed in her first World Cup of the season at the 2017 Tashkent World Cup where she won silver in the all-around behind Dina Averina, she qualified 3 apparatus finals winning gold in hoop, ball and ribbon. Her next event was at the 2017 Baku World Cup where she won her first gold medal in the all-around, she qualified to all apparatus finals taking gold in hoop, silver medals in ball, ribbon and bronze in clubs. On May 19–21, at the 2017 European Championships in Budapest, Hungary, Arina was member of the Golden winning Russian Team (together with senior individuals: twin sister Dina Averina, Aleksandra Soldatova and the junior group) scoring a total of 182.175 points which was more than 11 points ahead of their nearest competitor team Belarus. Arina qualified to 2 apparatus finals taking the gold medals in ball and clubs. On June 23–26, Arina then competed at the 2017 Holon Grand Prix taking gold in the all-around ahead of sister Dina, she qualified two apparatus finals winning gold in ribbon and silver in ball. At the quadrennial 2017 World Games which was held in Wrocław, Poland from July 20–30, Arina won 3 gold medals in hoop, ball, ribbon and a bronze medal in clubs. On August 11–13, Arina competed at the 2017 Kazan World Challenge Cup and won silver in the all-around behind Dina, she qualified in all the apparatus finals and won 2 gold medals in ball, ribbon and 2 silver medals in hoop, clubs. At the 2017 World Championships held on August 30 - September 3 in Pesaro, Italy, in the first day of the apparatus finals; Arina won gold in ball (18.950) and silver in hoop (19.000). During the individual all-around finals, she accumulated scores in (hoop:18.150, ball:18.500, clubs:18.550, ribbon:18.250) scoring a total of 73.450 points to win the silver medal behind twin sister Dina Averina.

==== 2018 ====
In 2018, recovering from an off season injury, Arina's season began in competition at the 2018 Grand Prix Moscow where she won the all-around silver medal, she qualified to 3 apparatus finals but withdrew due to a hand injury.

On March 24–25, Arina returned to competition at the 2018 Grand Prix Thiais where she finished 5th in all-around competition after big mistakes with ball. She qualified to two apparatus finals winning gold with clubs and silver with hoop. On April 13–15, she then competed at the 2018 Pesaro World Cup where she placed 4th in the all-around behind Linoy Ashram. She qualified to 3 apparatus finals and won gold with hoop, bronze with ribbon and placed 4th with clubs. On May 4–6, Arina's next event was 2018 Guadalajara World Challenge Cup where she won bronze in the all-around, she qualified to 3 apparatus finals winning gold with hoop and clubs and bronze with ribbon. On May 16–17, Arina competed at the 2018 Holon Grand Prix and won the all-around gold medal with a total of 76.700 points ahead of teammate Aleksandra Soldatova, she qualified in all apparatus finals.

==== 2019 ====
At the 2019 European Championships, she performed in qualifying with a hoop, ball and clubs and took gold medals in the finals with a ball and clubs, as well as gold in the team event.

At the 2019 Russian Championship, Arina Averina for the first time in her sports career became the absolute champion of the country in the all-around final, showing all exercises at the highest level and receiving record marks in exercises with a ball of 24.000 and clubs of 24.200, as well as 23.300 for a hoop and 22.300 for a ribbon. On the sum of the four exercises, her score was 93.800. Her sister Dina finished second with a total of 89,400.

At the World championship 2019 In Baku, Arina won All-around Silver behind her Sister Dina. She also won Silver in the Ball Final and Team Gold. She shared the Team Gold with Dina Averina and Ekaterina Selezneva.

==== 2020 ====
In 2020, at the first stage of the Grand Prix in Moscow, she withdrew from the competition due to injury. At the Russian Championship in February, she became the absolute champion in the individual standings. In the Estonian city of Tartu, at the second stage of the Grand Prix, Arina Averina became the absolute champion, having won four gold medals in exercises with a ribbon, ball, hoop and clubs. The remaining 2020 competitive season was curtailed by the coronavirus pandemic.

==== 2021 ====
Averina participated in two 2021 World Cups prior to the Olympics, Tashkent and Pesaro. At the Tashkent World Cup Averina won gold in ball and clubs, but did not make the podium for all-around, ribbon and hoop. At the Pesaro World Cup, she won gold in ribbon and clubs, silver in all-around behind her twin, and bronze in hoop and ball. At the European Championships in June, Averina won all-around gold. Her final competition prior to the Olympics was supposed to be the Moscow World Challenge Cup in July, but she withdrew and Lala Kramarenko took her place.

In August at the 2020 Olympic Games in Tokyo, Averina qualified to the rhythmic gymnastics individual all-around final in second place, behind her twin by 0.125 points, and ahead of Israel's Linoy Ashram. In the all-around final, Averina scored 102.100 overall after a ribbon routine with obvious errors. During her routine, a knot in her ribbon appeared after she stepped on it, which is why she had to grab the replacement Ribbon. Arina Averina finished fourth, behind champion Linoy Ashram, silver medalist Dina Averina, and bronze medalist Alina Harnasko. This was the first time since the 1996 Olympic Games that a Russian rhythmic gymnast did not win gold. After Russian allegations of judging bias in rhythmic gymnastics at the Olympics, FIG investigated and confirmed that the judging panels were fair and impartial.

In October, Averina competed at the World Championships in Kitakyushu, winning silver in ball behind her sister and finishing sixth with hoop.

==== 2022 ====
Following the Russian invasion of Ukraine the FIG banned all Russian and Belarusian Gymnasts until further notice, which is why Averina could only compete in domestic competitions.

==== 2024 ====
On February 23, 2024, Arina Averina, like her sister Dina, announced the end of their sports career at age of 25.

== Gymnastics technique ==
Arina Averina is known for her pivot turns and clean apparatus handling. She can execute a quadruple ring pivot and a triple Kanaeva ring pivot.

== Routine music information ==
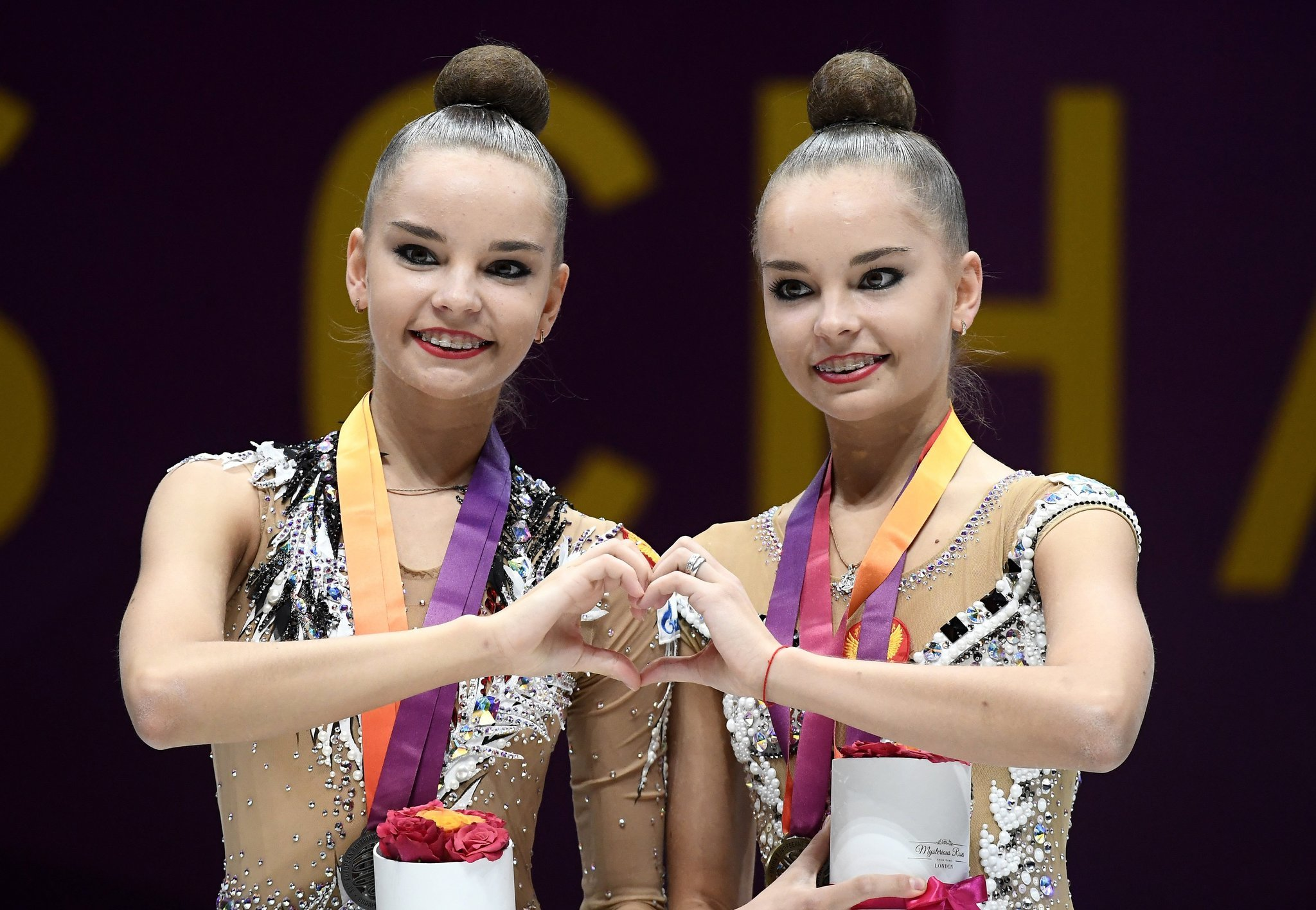
Arina with Dina at the 2017 European Championships podium.

Year	Apparatus	Music title
2023	Hoop	"Another One Bites The Dust" by Alexander Jean
2023	Ball	Skyfall by Jaimee Paul
2023	Clubs	"All That There Had Been" by Kvatro
2023	Ribbon	"Grande Amore" by Il Volo
2022	Hoop	"Ego", by Willy William
2022	Ball	"Kálmán: Die Csárdásfürstin / Act I - "Heia, heia, in den Bergen ist mein Heimatland" ", by Anna Netrebko, Emmanuel Villaume, Prague Philharmonia and Phillharmonic Choir
2022	Ball (second)	"Skyfall"by Jaimee Paul
2022	Clubs	"Eugene Onegin, Op. 24, TH 5: Polonaise", by Pyotr Ilyich Tchaikovsky
2022	Ribbon	"Voilà", by Barbara Pravi
2021	Hoop	"The Firebird", by Igor Stravinsky
2021	Ball	"Ironside", "Crane/White Lightning", "Don't Let Me Be Misunderstood" from Kill Bill, by Quincy Jones, Charles Bernstein & RZA, Santa Esmeralda
2021	Clubs (first)	"Bella Ciao (Música Original de la Serie la Casa de Papel/Money Heist)", by Manu Pilas
2021	Clubs (second)	"Bella Ciao", by Goran Bregovic and His Wedding and Funeral Orchestra
2021	Ribbon (first)	"Seguidilla" from Carmen, by Georges Bizet
2021	Ribbon (second)	"Time, Forward!", by Alexander Vedernikov & Russian Philharmonic Symphony Orchestra, composed by Georgy Sviridov
2021	Gala	"you should see me in a crown", by Billie Eilish
2020	Hoop (first)	"Largo Al Factotum", by Denis Matsuev & Filippa Giordano
2020	Hoop (second)	"España Cañi", by Andre Rieu & Johann Strauss Orchestra, composed by Pascual Marquina Narro
2020	Hoop (third)	"The Firebird", by Igor Stravinsky
2020	Ball	"Ironside", "Crane/White Lightning", "Don't Let Me Be Misunderstood" from Kill Bill, by Quincy Jones, Charles Bernstein & RZA, Santa Esmeralda
2020	Clubs (first)	"Shema (Hava Nagila)", by London Festival Orchestra, London Festival Chorus, composed by Stanley Black
2020	Clubs (second)	"Bella Ciao (Música Original de la Serie la Casa de Papel/Money Heist)", by Manu Pilas
2020	Ribbon (first)	"Time, Forward!", by Alexander Vedernikov & Russian Philharmonic Symphony Orchestra, composed by Georgy Sviridov
2020	Ribbon (second)	"Seguidilla" from Carmen, by Georges Bizet
2020	Gala	"Lash Out", by Alice Merton
2019	Hoop	"Don Quixote" (Street Dancer, The Toreador, Moderato, Moreno), by Nayden Todorov & Sofia National Opera Orchestra
2019	Ball	"Funiculi, Funicula", by Russell Watson
2019	Clubs	"Summer Wenzel", by Moiseyev Ballet
2019	Ribbon	"No. 12 in C Minor Revolutionary Etude", by Maurizio Pollini, composed by Frédéric Chopin
2019	Gala	"Lash Out", by Alice Merton
2018	Hoop	"La Bayadere (Act 2 No. 29)", by Richard Bonynge & English Chamber Orchestra
2018	Ball (second)	"Toy", by Netta
2018	Ball	"Architect of the Mind", by Kerry Muzzey
2018	Clubs	"Largo Al Factotum", by Pietro Spagnoli
2018	Ribbon	"The Firebird", by Igor Stravinsky
2018	Gala	"The Firebird", by Igor Stravinsky
2017	Hoop	"Taming of the Fire", by Andrey Petrov
2017	Ball	"La Felicità", by Simona Molinari, Peter Cincotti
2017	Clubs	"Live Is Life", by Opus
2017	Ribbon	"Csárdás (Hungarian Folk dance)", by Roby Lakatos
2017	Gala (first)	"Me Too", by Meghan Trainor
2017	Gala (second)	"The Firebird", by Igor Stravinsky
2016	Hoop	"Soul Sacrifice" by Santana
2016	Ball	"Hava Nagila" by London Festival Orchestra & Chorus
2016	Clubs	"Akh Vy Seni Moi Seni" by Marina Devyatova
2016	Ribbon	"Paquita: Pas De Deux" by London Symphony Orchestra
2015	Hoop	"Asturias" by Isaac Albéniz
2015	Ball	"ACT III": (Quiteria's Variation)
2015	Clubs	"Akh Vy Seni Moi Seni" by Marina Devyatova
2015	Ribbon	"Rio Rita" by Dj Valer Orchestra
2014	Hoop	"Volare", "Bang Bang", "Quien Como Tu" by JJ Vianello, Tito Nieves, Enzo Diaz
2014	Ball	"Capone", by Ronan Hardiman
2014	Clubs	"Livin' la Vida Loca" by Ricky Martin
2014	Ribbon	"Rio Rita" by Dj Valer Orchestra

== Detailed Olympic results ==
Year	Competition Description	Location	Music	Apparatus	Rank-Final	Score-Final	Rank-Qualifying	Score-Qualifying
2020	Olympics	Tokyo		All-around	4th	102.100	2nd	106.175
2020	Olympics	Tokyo	"The Firebird" by Igor Stravinsky	Hoop	3rd	26.850	2nd	27.225
2020	Olympics	Tokyo	"Ironside", "Crane/White Lightning", "Don't Let Me Be Misunderstood" from Kill Bill, by Quincy Jones, Charles Bernstein & RZA, Santa Esmeralda	Ball	3rd	27.900	3rd	27.250
2020	Olympics	Tokyo	"Bella Ciao (Música Original de la Serie la Casa de Papel/Money Heist)", by Manu Pilas	Clubs	3rd	27.800	2nd	28.100
2020	Olympics	Tokyo	"Seguidilla" from Carmen, by Georges Bizet	Ribbon	10th	19.550	1st	23.600

== Competitive highlights ==
(Team competitions in seniors are held only at the World Championships, Europeans and other Continental Games.)

International: Senior
Year	Event	AA	Team	Hoop	Ball	Clubs	Ribbon
2021	World Championships	3rd	1st	6th	2nd	2nd	3rd
2021	Olympico Cup	2nd		1st	2nd	1st	3rd (OC)
2021	Olympic Games	4th					
2021	European Championships	1st	1st		4th	9th (Q)	3rd
2021	World Cup Pesaro	2nd		3rd	3rd	1st	1st
2021	World Cup Tashkent	2nd		4th	1st	1st	38th (Q)
2021	International Online Tournament (Finnish Gymnastics Federation)	2nd					
2021	Schmiden Gymnastik International Online	2nd					
2021	Grand Prix Moscow	2nd		1st	2nd	2nd	5th
2020	3rd International Online Tournament (Russian Rhythmic Gymnastics Federation)	2nd		1st	1st	2nd (Q)	2nd (Q)
2020	2nd International Online Tournament (Russian Rhythmic Gymnastics Federation)	2nd (Q)		1st	2nd (Q)	2nd (Q)	1st
2020	Russia-Belarus Friendly Match	2nd					
2020	Grand Prix Tartu	1st		1st	1st	1st	1st
2020	Grand Prix Moscow	WD		3rd (Q)	6th (Q)	DNS	DNS
2019	Aeon Cup	2nd	1st				
2019	World Championships	2nd	1st		2nd	4th	6th (Q)
2019	World Cup Kazan	2nd		1st	2nd	2nd	2nd
2019	World Cup Minsk	2nd		2nd	2nd	3rd	2nd
2019	Grand Prix Brno	2nd		1st	1st	7th (Q)	1st
2019	European Championships		1st	14th (Q)	1st	1st	
2019	World Cup Baku	2nd		22nd (Q)	5th	2nd	2nd
2019	World Cup Pesaro	2nd		1st	1st	6th	6th
2019	Grand Prix Thiais	1st		2nd	1st	2nd	6th
2019	Grand Prix Marbella	6th		16th (Q)	3rd	2nd	15th (Q)
2019	Grand Prix Moscow	2nd		2nd	10th (Q)	4th (Q)	1st
2018	Aeon Cup	2nd	1st				
2018	World Championships	3rd (Q)	1st	3rd	3rd (Q)	3rd	49th (Q)
2018	European Championships	1st	NT				
2018	Grand Prix Holon	1st		1st	2nd	7th	5th
2018	World Cup Guadalajara	3rd		1st	10th (Q)	1st	3rd
2018	World Cup Pesaro	4th		1st	9th (Q)	5th	2nd
2018	Grand Prix Thiais	5th		2nd	20th (Q)	1st	5th (Q)
2018	Grand Prix Moscow	2nd		WD	WD	3rd (Q)	WD
2017	World Championships	2nd	NT	2nd	1st	3rd	1st
2017	World Cup Kazan	2nd		2nd	1st	2nd	1st
2017	World Games			1st	1st	3rd	1st
2017	Grand Prix Holon	1st		3rd (Q)	2nd	3rd (Q)	1st
2017	European Championships		1st		1st	1st	
2017	World Cup Baku	1st		1st	2nd	3rd	2nd
2017	World Cup Tashkent	2nd		1st	1st	9th (Q)	1st
2017	Grand Prix Marbella	2nd		5th (Q)	3rd	3rd	8th (Q)
2017	Desio Italia Trophy	2nd	1st				
2017	Grand Prix Moscow	3rd		8th (Q)	3rd (Q)	4th (Q)	2nd
2016	Dalia Kutkaite Cup	2nd					
2016	Grand Prix Final	3rd		2nd	3rd (Q)	6th (Q)	2nd
2016	World Cup Berlin	WD		11th (Q)	5th (Q)	DNS	DNS
2016	World Cup Sofia	4th		3rd	4th	3rd	6th
2016	Grand Prix Bucharest	2nd		4th	2nd	3rd	3rd
2016	Grand Prix Brno	5th		4th (Q)	12th (Q)	4th (Q)	6th (Q)
2016	Grand Prix Thiais	5th		11th (Q)	5th (Q)	4th	4th
2016	World Cup Lisbon	5th		17th (Q)	4th	12th (Q)	2nd
2016	Grand Prix Moscow	3rd		7th (Q)	6th (Q)	2nd	1st
2015	Dundee Cup	2nd					
2015	MTK Budapest Cup	3rd		2nd	3rd	6th (Q)	5th (Q)
2015	Corbeil-Essonnes International	1st		1st	1st	1st	1st
2015	International Tournament of Pesaro		1st		1st		1st
2014	EWUB Luxembourg Trophy	2nd		2nd (Q)			2nd (Q)
2014	Baltic Hoop	2nd		3rd	1st	2nd	2nd
2014	Holon International Tournament	1st		1st	1st	2nd (OC)	2nd
2014	Alina International Tournament	2nd					
International: Junior
Year	Event	AA	Team	Hoop	Ball	Clubs	Ribbon
2013	Happy Caravan Cup		1st		1st		
2012	MTM Ljubljana		1st				
2012	Venera Cup	3rd		3rd	2nd	3rd	3rd
2012	Junior Grand Prix Moscow		4th (OC)				
2011	Russian-Chinese Youth Games	5th					
National
Year	Event	AA	Team	Hoop	Ball	Clubs	Ribbon
2021	Russian Championships	1st	3rd	1st	1st	2nd	2nd
2020	Russian Championships	1st	2nd				
2019	Russian Championships	1st	2nd				
2018	Russian Championships	WD					
2017	Russian Championships	3rd	1st	2nd	1st	1st	1st
2016	Russian Championships	4th	1st	3rd	2nd	3rd	4th
2015	Russian Championships	2nd	1st	1st	2nd	1st	2nd
2014	Russian Championships	7th	1st	3rd	1st	2nd	4th
2013	Russian Junior Championships	5th					
2012	Russian Junior Championships	11th					
2011	Russian Junior Championships	9th					
Q = Qualifications (Did not advance to Event Final due to the 2 gymnast per country rule, only Top 8 highest score); WR = World Record; WD = Withdrew; NT = No Team Competition; OC = Out of Competition(competed but scores not counted for qualifications/results)

== See also ==
On 03/22/18, they performed on the main stage of the Luzhniki Stadium in honor of the anniversary of the annexation of Crimea. On the clothes you can see the symbols Z (the symbol of Putin's war in Ukraine). Thus, they supported the invasion of the occupation forces in Ukraine

https://sportrbc.ru/news/6239add49a7947d0d4457548

- Dina Averina
