= 2023 Rhythmic Gymnastics World Championships =

- Venue: Feria Valencia
- Location: Valencia, Spain
- Dates: 23–27 August 2023
- Competitors: 232 from 62 nations

The 2023 Rhythmic Gymnastics World Championships were held in Valencia, Spain at the Feria Valencia.

The championships is a qualification event for the 2024 Olympic Games in Paris. The 14 highest-ranked individuals from the all-around competition (qualification), with a maximum of two gymnasts per NOC, and the top 5 groups, not including teams that qualified at the previous year's World Championships, will obtain one quota place for their country.

== Participating countries ==
Participants	Nations
Group + 3 individuals	Azerbaijan Bulgaria Hungary
Group + 2 individuals	Brazil China Spain France Germany Greece Israel Italy Japan Kazakhstan Ukraine United States Uzbekistan
Group + 1 individual	Australia Czech Republic Estonia Finland Georgia Mexico Poland
Group	Turkey
3 individuals	Egypt Philippines Slovenia
2 individuals	Canada New Zealand Romania
1 individual	Andorra Angola Argentina Austria Belgium Bosnia and Herzegovina Colombia Croatia Cyprus Great Britain Indonesia Kyrgyzstan South Korea Latvia Laos Lithuania Luxembourg Malaysia Moldova Mongolia Montenegro Norway Portugal South Africa Singapore San Marino Serbia Sri Lanka Switzerland Slovakia Sweden Chinese Taipei

== Schedule ==
- Wednesday, August 23
  - All Day: Individual Qualification - Hoop and Ball
  - Evening; Individual Hoop and Ball Final
- Thursday, August 24
  - All Day: Individual Qualification - Clubs and Ribbon
  - Evening; Individual Clubs and Ribbon Final
- Friday, August 25
  - All Day: Group All Around
- Saturday, August 26
  - Individual All Around Final
- Sunday, August 27
  - Group 5 Hoops Final & 3 Ribbons + 2 Balls Final
  - Closing Ceremony

== Medal summary ==
Event	Gold	Silver	Bronze
Team Competition
Team All-Around	Bulgaria; Individuals; Eva Brezalieva; Boryana Kaleyn; Stiliana Nikolova; Group; Sofia Ivanova; Kamelia Petrova; Rachel Stoyanov; Radina Tomova; Zhenina Trashlieva	Germany; Individuals; Margarita Kolosov; Darja Varfolomeev; Group; Anja Kosan; Daniella Kromm; Alina Oganesyan; Hannah Vester; Emilia Wickert	Italy; Individuals; Milena Baldassarri; Sofia Raffaeli; Group; Martina Centofanti; Agnese Duranti; Alessia Maurelli; Daniela Mogurean; Laura Paris; Alessia Russo
Individual Finals
All-Around	(Germany) Darja Varfolomeev	(Italy) Sofia Raffaeli	(Israel) Daria Atamanov
Hoop	(Germany) Darja Varfolomeev	(Italy) Sofia Raffaeli	(Hungary) Fanni Pigniczki
Ball	(Germany) Darja Varfolomeev	(Italy) Sofia Raffaeli	(Bulgaria) Stiliana Nikolova
Clubs	(Germany) Darja Varfolomeev	(Bulgaria) Boryana Kaleyn	(Ukraine) Viktoriia Onopriienko
Ribbon	(Germany) Darja Varfolomeev	(Bulgaria) Boryana Kaleyn	(Slovenia) Ekaterina Vedeneeva
Groups Finals
Group All-Around	Israel; Shani Bakanov; Eliza Banchuk; Adar Friedmann; Romi Paritzki; Ofir Shaham; Diana Svertsov	China; Ding Xinyi; Guo Qiqi; Hao Ting; Huang Zhangjiayang; Pu Yanzhu; Wang Lanjing	Spain; Ana Arnau; Inés Bergua; Mireia Martínez; Patricia Pérez; Salma Solaun
5 Hoops	China; Ding Xinyi; Guo Qiqi; Hao Ting; Huang Zhangjiayang*; Pu Yanzhu; Wang Lanjing	Spain; Ana Arnau; Inés Bergua; Mireia Martínez; Patricia Pérez; Salma Solaun	Italy; Martina Centofanti; Agnese Duranti; Alessia Maurelli; Daniela Mogurean; Laura Paris; Alessia Russo*
3 Ribbons + 2 Balls	Israel; Shani Bakanov; Eliza Banchuk; Adar Friedmann*; Romi Paritzki; Ofir Shaham; Diana Svertsov	China; Ding Xinyi*; Guo Qiqi; Hao Ting; Huang Zhangjiayang; Pu Yanzhu; Wang Lanjing	Ukraine; Yelyzaveta Azza; Diana Baieva; Daryna Duda; Alina Melnyk; Mariia Vysochanska*; Oleksandra Yushchak

* reserve gymnast

== Individual ==
=== Individual Qualification ===
- The top 8 scores in individual apparatus qualify to the apparatus finals and the top 18 in overall qualification scores advance to the all-around final.

Rank	Gymnast	Nation	Hoop (rhythmic gymnastics)	Ball (rhythmic gymnastics)	Clubs (rhythmic gymnastics)	Ribbon (rhythmic gymnastics)	Total	
1	Stiliana Nikolova	Bulgaria	34.700 (2)	35.150 (1)	34.450 (1)		104.300	Q
2	Darja Varfolomeev	Germany	34.300 (3)	35.000 (2)	33.300 (4)	32.850 (1)	102.600	Q
3	Sofia Raffaeli	Italy	35.850 (1)	34.250 (3)	30.500 (15)	31.700 (4)	101.800	Q
4	Boryana Kaleyn	Bulgaria	33.900 (4)	34.100 (4)	33.450 (2)	32.050 (3)	101.450	Q
5	Ekaterina Vedeneeva	Slovenia	33.350 (5)	32.600 (7)	31.600 (9)	31.000 (7)	97.550	Q
6	Polina Berezina	Spain	32.900 (9)	32.100 (11)	32.450 (6)	30.950 (9)	97.450	Q
7	Daria Atamanov	Israel	31.400 (17)	32.950 (5)	31.550 (10)	32.500 (2)	97.000	Q
8	Viktoriia Onopriienko	Ukraine	32.500 (13)	30.950 (20)	33.350 (3)	30.650 (12)	96.800	Q
9	Takhmina Ikromova	Uzbekistan	32.200 (14)	27.600 (50)	32.800 (5)	31.600 (5)	96.600	Q
10	Margarita Kolosov	Germany	33.100 (7)	31.050 (19)	31.800 (7)	30.550 (14)	95.950	Q
11	Fanni Pigniczki	Hungary	33.100 (8)	31.550 (18)	29.900 (22)	31.050 (6)	95.700	Q
12	Zohra Aghamirova	Azerbaijan	32.500 (12)	32.400 (9)	29.000 (28)	30.350 (16)	95.250	Q
13	Hélène Karbanov	France	32.650 (11)	31.650 (16)	30.600 (13)	30.150 (17)	94.900	Q
14	Bárbara Domingos	Brazil	29.800 (32)	32.100 (12)	31.700 (8)	30.700 (11)	94.500	Q
15	Milena Baldassarri	Italy	32.800 (10)	30.700 (22)	30.750 (11)	29.150 (25)	94.250	Q
16	Alba Bautista	Spain	33.350 (6)	32.000 (13)	28.700 (35)	26.800 (36)	94.050	Q
17	Annaliese Dragan	Romania	31.200 (19)	32.350 (10)	30.000 (21)	28.750 (26)	93.550	Q
18	Wang Zilu	China	31.700 (16)	28.050 (43)	30.700 (12)	31.000 (8)	93.400	Q
19	Erika Zhailauova	Kazakhstan	31.100 (20)	31.550 (17)	30.300 (19)	28.250 (29)	92.950	R1
20	Andreea Verdes	Romania	31.250 (18)	30.800 (21)	30.400 (17)	28.050 (32)	92.450	R2
21	Geovanna Santos	Brazil	32.150 (15)	31.800 (14)	27.300 (48)	28.050 (31)	92.000	R3
22	Panagiota Lytra	Greece	30.800 (22)	32.750 (6)	28.300 (39)	28.450 (28)	92.000	R4
23	Evelina Atalyants	Uzbekistan	25.800 (56)	31.700 (15)	30.100 (20)	29.900 (19)	91.700	
24	Hanna Panna Wiesner	Hungary	30.950 (21)	30.250 (30)	28.650 (36)	30.400 (15)	91.600	
25	Polina Karika	Ukraine	30.050 (27)	30.700 (23)	28.950 (30)	30.700 (10)	91.450	
26	Elzhana Taniyeva	Kazakhstan	29.100 (36)	32.450 (8)	29.400 (27)	29.550 (23)	91.400	
27	Adi Asya Katz	Israel	30.000 (28)	30.600 (25)	30.450 (16)	29.600 (22)	91.050	
28	Evita Griskenas	United States	29.900 (29)	30.600 (26)	30.500 (14)	29.250 (24)	91.000	
29	Marina Malpica	Mexico	30.400 (23)	28.700 (37)	29.800 (24)	30.600 (13)	90.800	
30	Emmi Piiroinen	Finland	30.250 (24)	30.350 (28)	29.750 (25)	24.000 (67)	90.350	
31	Emilia Heichel	Poland	29.200 (35)	30.700 (24)	30.350 (18)	28.700 (27)	90.250	
32	Lili Mizuno	United States	30.150 (25)	29.950 (32)	29.850 (23)	30.100 (18)	90.200	
33	Mirano Kita	Japan	30.050 (26)	30.150 (31)	29.600 (26)	26.250 (42)	89.800	
34	Zhao Yating	China	29.800 (33)	30.300 (29)	29.950 (32)	29.700 (20)	89.800	
35	Maelle Millet	France	29.850 (30)	30.500 (27)	27.150 (49)	28.200 (30)	88.550	
36	Ketevan Arbolishvili	Georgia	28.600 (42)	28.200 (42)	28.950 (29)	26.050 (42)	85.750	
37	Alexandra Kiroi-Bogatyreva	Australia	28.800 (38)	27.100 (52)	28.750 (33)	25.200 (54)	84.650	
38	Celeste D'Arcangelo	Argentina	27.900 (47)	27.900 (47)	28.750 (34)	25.550 (49)	84.550	
39	Havana Hopman	New Zealand	27.900 (46)	27.950 (46)	28.450 (37)	26.150 (43)	84.300	
40	Fausta Šostakaitė	Lithuania	28.750 (40)	27.700 (49)	27.750 (45)	27.050 (35)	84.200	
41	Tatiana Cocsanova	Canada	29.800 (31)	28.800 (35)	25.100 (67)	25.250 (53)	83.850	
42	Sohn Ji-in	South Korea	28.100 (44)	28.600 (40)	26.900 (52)	26.700 (38)	83.600	
43	Norah Demierre	Switzerland	28.800 (39)	25.600 (67)	27.950 (43)	26.550 (40)	83.300	
44	Carmel Kallemaa	Canada	27.500 (49)	28.700 (38)	27.000 (51)	26.700 (37)	83.200	
45	Marfa Ekimova	Great Britain	25.750 (57)	28.450 (41)	28.050 (41)	26.600 (39)	83.100	
46	Mikayla Angeline Yang	Singapore	28.700 (41)	28.600 (39)	25.750 (63)	25.550 (48)	83.050	
47	Rita Araujo	Portugal	26.350 (53)	28.000 (45)	28.400 (38)	24.750 (59)	82.750	
48	Josephine Juul Møller	Norway	23.150 (74)	28.800 (36)	26.400 (57)	27.250 (33)	82.450	
49	Ester Kreitsman	Estonia	28.900 (37)		28.050 (42)	25.300 (51)	82.250	
50	Emily Beznos	Moldova	27.300 (50)	27.550 (51)	26.600 (54)	24.150 (63)	81.450	
51	Ilona Zeynalova	Azerbaijan	25.100 (65)	28.000 (44)	28.100 (40)		81.200	
52	Aliaa Saleh	Egypt		27.050 (53)	26.850 (53)	27.100 (34)	81.000	
53	Ng Joe Ee	Malaysia	28.050 (45)	24.850 (70)	27.800 (44)	25.050 (57)	80.900	
54	Maria Dervisi	Greece	23.800 (70)	29.400 (34)	27.650 (46)	23.150 (71)	80.850	
55	Habiba Marzouk	Egypt	29.550 (34)	26.800 (57)		24.100 (64)	80.450	
56	Breanna Labadan	Philippines	27.650 (48)	26.350 (60)	26.200 (59)	26.400 (41)	80.400	
57	Aino Yamada	Japan	28.400 (43)	23.350 (77)	26.250 (58)	25.150 (55)	79.800	
58	Li Tzu-Wen	Chinese Taipei	23.750 (71)	26.950 (54)	27.450 (47)	25.250 (52)	79.650	
59	Michaela Zaťková	Slovakia	25.300 (62)	27.900 (48)	24.950 (68)	25.850 (47)	79.050	
60	Elizaveta Lugovskikh	Montenegro	25.200 (64)	26.200 (61)	27.000 (50)	24.500 (61)	78.400	
61	Luana Gomes	Angola	25.300 (63)	26.150 (62)	26.600 (55)	25.350 (50)	78.100	
62	Denisa Štěpánková	Czech Republic	25.700 (58)	26.900 (55)	24.700 (70)	24.000 (66)	77.300	
63	Evelina Orphanou	Cyprus	25.550 (59)	25.750 (65)	25.950 (61)	24.540 (62)	77.250	
64	Oriana Viñas	Colombia	27.300 (51)	25.350 (69)	24.500 (73)	22.300 (74)	77.150	
65	Undram Khashbat	Mongolia	22.750 (76)	26.550 (58)	26.450 (56)	24.050 (65)	77.050	
66	Julia Neumann	Austria	26.150 (54)	23.200 (78)	25.550 (64)	25.050 (56)	76.750	
67	Tamara Artić	Croatia	24.750 (67)	26.450 (59)	25.350 (65)	23.400 (70)	76.550	
68	Masa Tosic	Serbia	23.250 (73)	26.100 (63)	26.150 (60)	23.850 (68)	76.100	
69	Alva Svennbeck	Sweden	25.350 (61)	25.500 (68)	22.300 (79)	24.850 (58)	75.700	
70	Alessia Verstappen	Belgium	25.500 (60)	24.050 (73)	25.950 (62)	21.500 (77)	75.500	
71	Santa Stepulāne	Latvia	24.700 (69)	25.700 (66)	24.700 (71)	24.550 (60)	75.100	
72	Stephanie Dimitrova	South Africa	24.850 (66)	24.800 (71)	24.700 (72)	20.300 (81)	74.350	
73	Berta Miquel	Andorra	22.600 (78)	26.850 (56)	21.500 (83)	23.850 (69)	73.300	
74	Anna-Marie Ondaatje	Sri Lanka	24.750 (68)	23.400 (76)	24.700 (69)	20.200 (82)	72.850	
75	Paris Chin	New Zealand	23.300 (72)	24.000 (64)	23.300 (78)	21.600 (76)	72.600	
76	Matilde Tamgnini	San Marino	22.600 (79)	24.450 (72)	24.300 (74)	22.500 (73)	71.350	
77	Praewa Misato Philaphandeth	Laos	22.300 (80)	24.050 (74)	23.950 (75)	23.000 (72)	71.000	
78	Sophie Turpel	Luxembourg	22.700 (77)	23.850 (75)	23.450 (77)	20.950 (79)	70.000	
79	Daniela Reggie Dela Pisa	Philippines	21.900 (81)	22.350 (82)	23.800 (76)		68.050	
80	Tri Wahyuni	Indonesia	22.900 (75)	22.700 (80)	22.200 (80)	21.900 (75)	67.800	
81	Amila Bećirović	Bosnia and Herzegovina	18.450 (83)	23.000 (79)	21.800 (81)	18.450 (83)	66.000	
82	Albina Kozubaeva	Kyrgyzstan	21.500 (82)	20.950 (82)	21.600 (82)	20.300 (80)	64.050	

=== All-Around Final ===
Rank	Gymnast	Nation	Hoop (rhythmic gymnastics)	Ball (rhythmic gymnastics)	Clubs (rhythmic gymnastics)	Ribbon (rhythmic gymnastics)	Total
1st place, gold medalist(s)	Darja Varfolomeev	Germany	35.100 (3)	35.650 (1)	34.250 (1)	32.450 (2)	137.450
2nd place, silver medalist(s)	Sofia Raffaeli	Italy	35.500 (2)	34.450 (2)	32.700 (7)	33.050 (1)	135.700
3rd place, bronze medalist(s)	Daria Atamanov	Israel	34.150 (5)	33.450 (3)	33.550 (3)	30.250 (10)	131.400
4	Stiliana Nikolova	Bulgaria	35.550 (1)	32.000	33.500 (4)	29.600	130.650
5	Takhmina Ikromova	Uzbekistan	32.800 (8)	32.500	33.200 (5)	31.900 (4)	130.400
6	Boryana Kaleyn	Bulgaria	31.950	31.900	33.800 (2)	32.300 (3)	129.950
7	Viktoriia Onopriienko	Ukraine	34.500 (4)	32.350	33.150 (6)	29.850	129.850
8	Alba Bautista	Spain	32.500 (10)	33.050 (6)	31.650	31.600 (5)	128.800
9	Ekaterina Vedeneeva	Slovenia	32.700 (9)	33.300 (4)	30.350	31.300 (6)	127.650
10	Wang Zilu	China	32.400	32.850 (9)	32.500 (8)	29.350	127.100
11	Bárbara Domingos	Brazil	32.350	31.750	30.800	31.200 (7)	126.100
12	Margarita Kolosov	Germany	33.500 (7)	29.650	31.600	31.050 (8)	125.800
13	Milena Baldassarri	Italy	31.600	32.200	31.100	30.800 (9)	125.700
14	Polina Berezina	Spain	31.650	33.000 (7)	32.350 (9)	28.500	125.500
15	Annaliese Dragan	Romania	31.350	31.400	32.100 (10)	29.900	124.750
16	Fanni Pigniczki	Hungary	33.650 (6)	32.800 (10)	30.100	27.800	124.350
17	Hélène Karbanov	France	30.450	33.100 (5)	29.150	30.050	122.750
18	Zohra Aghamirova	Azerbaijan	32.050	32.900 (8)	28.550	28.950	122.450

=== Hoop ===
Rank	Gymnast	Nation	D Score	E Score	A Score	Pen.	Total
1st place, gold medalist(s)	Darja Varfolomeev	Germany	18.900	8.450	8.400		35.750
2nd place, silver medalist(s)	Sofia Raffaeli	Italy	18.300	8.400	8.550		35.250
3rd place, bronze medalist(s)	Fanni Pigniczki	Hungary	17.900	8.050	8.100		34.050
4	Boryana Kaleyn	Bulgaria	17.400	8.250	8.300		33.950
5	Margarita Kolosov	Germany	17.100	8.150	8.100		33.350
6	Ekaterina Vedeneeva	Slovenia	16.200	8.250	8.200		32.650
7	Alba Bautista	Spain	16.200	8.000	8.200		32.400
8	Stiliana Nikolova	Bulgaria	16.600	7.700	8.050		32.350

=== Ball ===
Rank	Gymnast	Nation	D Score	E Score	A Score	Pen.	Total
1st place, gold medalist(s)	Darja Varfolomeev	Germany	18.900	8.550	8.350		35.800
2nd place, silver medalist(s)	Sofia Raffaeli	Italy	18.200	8.450	8.550		35.200
3rd place, bronze medalist(s)	Stiliana Nikolova	Bulgaria	18.500	8.250	8.400		35.150
4	Boryana Kaleyn	Bulgaria	17.000	8.400	8.400		33.800
5	Daria Atamanov	Israel	16.600	8.300	8.300		33.200
6	Ekaterina Vedeneeva	Slovenia	15.900	8.200	8.200		32.300
7	Elzhana Taniyeva	Kazakhstan	15.200	8.250	8.000		31.450
8	Panagiota Lytra	Greece	15.500	7.300	7.600		30.400

=== Clubs ===
Rank	Gymnast	Nation	D Score	E Score	A Score	Pen.	Total
1st place, gold medalist(s)	Darja Varfolomeev	Germany	17.200	8.550	8.600		34.350
2nd place, silver medalist(s)	Boryana Kaleyn	Bulgaria	16.500	8.450	8.600		33.550
3rd place, bronze medalist(s)	Viktoriia Onopriienko	Ukraine	16.700	8.300	8.600	0.050	33.550
4	Takhmina Ikromova	Uzbekistan	16.700	8.350	8.400		33.450
5	Polina Berezina	Spain	15.600	8.250	8.250		32.100
6	Stiliana Nikolova	Bulgaria	15.800	7.950	8.300		32.050
7	Bárbara Domingos	Brazil	14.700	8.150	8.250	0.050	31.050
8	Margarita Kolosov	Germany	15.200	7.850	8.000	0.300	30.750

=== Ribbon ===
Rank	Gymnast	Nation	D Score	E Score	A Score	Pen.	Total
1st place, gold medalist(s)	Darja Varfolomeev	Germany	16.400	8.450	8.500		33.350
2nd place, silver medalist(s)	Boryana Kaleyn	Bulgaria	15.300	8.100	8.450		31.850
3rd place, bronze medalist(s)	Ekaterina Vedeneeva	Slovenia	14.600	8.300	8.250	0.050	31.100
4	Sofia Raffaeli	Italy	14.900	7.900	8.250		31.050
5	Wang Zilu	China	14.700	7.950	7.850		30.500
6	Fanni Pigniczki	Hungary	14.600	7.850	7.650	0.100	30.000
7	Daria Atamanov	Israel	14.400	7.300	8.100	0.050	29.750
8	Takhmina Ikromova	Uzbekistan	12.900	7.650	8.050		28.600

== Groups ==
=== Squads ===
Team	Australia (AUS)	Azerbaijan (AZE)	Brazil (BRA)	Bulgaria (BUL)	China (CHN)	Czech Republic (CZE)
Members	Ainsey Barker; Laura Gosling; Ashleigh Law; Tahlya Smith; Charlotte Wong	Gullu Aghalarzade; Laman Alimuradova; Kamilla Aliyeva; Zeynab Hummatova; Yelyzaveta Luzan	Duda Arakaki; Déborah Medrado; Giovanna Oliveira; Sofia Pereira; Nicole Pircio; Barbara Urquiza	Sofia Ivanova; Kamelia Petrova; Rachel Stoyanov; Radina Tomova; Zhenina Trashlieva	Ding Xinyi; Guo Qiqi; Hao Ting; Huang Zhangjiayang; Pu Yanzhu; Wang Lanjing	Isabela Hortová; Anita Lencová; Tereza Staňková; Nikola Stieblerová; Tereza Suchá
Team	Estonia (EST)	Finland (FIN)	France (FRA)	Georgia (GEO)	Germany (GER)	Greece (GRE)
Members	Maria Muravjova; Kiara Oja; Ksenja Ozigina; Victoria Puusepp; Vanessa Vulf	Elisabeth Jamil; Lia Kallio; Nea Kapiainen; Alisa Karpenko; Anni Olkkonen; Anastasiia Polishchuk	Eleonore Caburet; Emma Delaine; Ainhoa Dot; Manelle Inaho; Justine Lavit; Lozea Vilarino	Ana Bejiashvili; Mariam Kupunia; Magda Meskhi; Darya Ragimova; Mariam Tskhomaria	Anja Kosan; Daniella Kromm; Alina Oganesyan; Hannah Vester; Emilia Wickert	Elpida Englezou; Eira Laura Gkikoka; Kalomoira Karoki; Eirini Chrysovalanto Konisti; Christina Ourania Riga; Marieta Topollai
Team	Hungary (HUN)	Israel (ISR)	Italy (ITA)	Japan (JPN)	Kazakhstan (KAZ)	Mexico (MEX)
Members	Lilla Jurca; Gyöngyvirág Kajner; Mandula Virag Meszaros; Dalma Pesti; Dora Szabados; Monika Urban-Szabo	Shani Bakanov; Eliza Banchuk; Adar Friedmann; Romi Paritzki; Ofir Shaham; Diana Svertsov	Martina Centofanti; Agnese Duranti; Alessia Maurelli; Daniela Mogurean; Laura Paris; Alessia Russo	Rina Imaoka; Rinako Inaki; Chihana Nakamura; Megumi Nishimoto; Ayuka Suzuki; Hisano Taguchi	Aksungkar Abdirakhman; Ayaulym Kadir; Aruzhan Kalsayeva; Aruzhan Kassenova; Bayan Koibakar; Aidana Shayakhmetova	Dalia Alcocer; Sofia Flores; Julia Gutierrez; Kimberly Salazar; Adirem Tejeda; Karen Villanueva
Team	Poland (POL)	Spain (ESP)	Turkey (TUR)	Ukraine (UKR)	United States (USA)	Uzbekistan (UZB)
Members	Milena Górska; Madoka Przybylska; Małgorzata Roszatycka; Magdalena Szewczuk; Julia Wojciechowska	Ana Arnau; Inés Bergua; Mireia Martínez; Patricia Pérez; Salma Solaun	Işıl Alaş; Yeliz Gunes; Neriman Aleyna Kocamaz; Nehir Serap Ozdemir; Melisa Sert; Victoria Sidorova	Yelyzaveta Azza; Diana Baieva; Daryna Duda; Alina Melnyk; Mariia Vysochanska; Oleksandra Yushchak	Isabelle Connor; Gergana Petkova; Karolina Saverino; Hana Starkman; Katerine Sakhnov	Rukhshona Dekhkonova; Nargiza Djumaniyazova; Shakhzoda Ibragimova; Mumtozabonu Iskhokzoda; Mariya Pak; Irodakhon Sadikova

=== All-Around ===
The top 8 scores in the apparatus qualifies to the group apparatus finals.

Place	Nation	5	3 + 2	Total
1st place, gold medalist(s)	Israel	38.150 (1)	32.650 (4)	70.800
2nd place, silver medalist(s)	China	36.900 (3)	33.150 (2)	70.050
3rd place, bronze medalist(s)	Spain	35.600 (4)	33.000 (3)	68.600
4	Italy	37.650 (2)	30.500 (10)	68.150
5	Ukraine	34.800 (8)	32.600 (5)	67.400
6	Brazil	34.900 (6)	30.100 (11)	65.000
7	France	35.350 (5)	29.350 (12)	64.700
8	Germany	33.450 (10)	30.950 (9)	64.400
9	Azerbaijan	31.700 (12)	32.300 (6)	63.900
10	Poland	34.850 (7)	28.850 (13)	63.700
11	Greece	34.150 (9)	28.550 (15)	62.700
12	Bulgaria	28.600 (19)	34.100 (1)	62.700
13	Japan	31.650 (13)	31.050 (7)	62.700
14	Mexico	31.200 (14)	31.050 (8)	62.250
15	Uzbekistan	30.650 (15)	28.750 (14)	59.400
16	Hungary	32.000 (11)	22.350 (21)	54.350
17	Finland	29.350 (18)	23.300 (20)	52.650
18	United States	25.850 (24)	26.700 (16)	52.550
19	Czech Republic	26.650 (20)	25.850 (17)	52.500
20	Kazakhstan	30.300 (16)	21.450 (23)	51.750
21	Georgia	26.050 (23)	24.850 (18)	50.900
22	Turkey	26.250 (22)	24.500 (19)	50.750
23	Australia	26.400 (21)	21.800 (22)	48.200
24	Estonia	29.700 (17)	17.600 (24)	47.300

=== 5 Hoops ===
Rank	Nation	D Score	E Score	A Score	Pen.	Total
1st place, gold medalist(s)	China	20.200	7.700	8.650		36.550
2nd place, silver medalist(s)	Spain	20.200	7.550	8.350		36.100
3rd place, bronze medalist(s)	Italy	19.500	7.750	8.600		35.850
4	Brazil	20.300	7.350	8.250	0.050	35.850
5	Israel	19.700	7.200	8.400		35.300
6	Poland	19.400	7.150	8.200	0.050	34.700
7	Ukraine	17.200	6.550	8.050		31.800
8	France	16.400	5.650	7.300	0.100	29.250

=== 3 Ribbons + 2 Balls ===
Rank	Nation	D Score	E Score	A Score	Pen.	Total
1st place, gold medalist(s)	Israel	18.300	7.950	8.550		34.800
2nd place, silver medalist(s)	China	16.400	7.900	8.500		32.800
3rd place, bronze medalist(s)	Ukraine	17.100	7.050	8.150		32.300
4	Spain	15.700	7.050	8.000		30.750
5	Azerbaijan	15.800	6.850	7.950	0.300	30.300
6	Japan	16.000	6.350	7.900	0.600	29.650
7	Bulgaria	15.700	6.300	7.950	0.300	29.650
8	Mexico	13.500	5.500	7.350	0.900	25.450

== Team ==
=== Combined Team Ranking ===
Place	Nation	Hoop (rhythmic gymnastics)	Ball (rhythmic gymnastics)	Clubs (rhythmic gymnastics)	Ribbon (rhythmic gymnastics)	5	3 + 2	Total
1st place, gold medalist(s)	Bulgaria	68.600	69.250	67.900	61.700	28.600	34.100	330.150
2nd place, silver medalist(s)	Germany	67.400	66.050	65.100	63.400	33.450	30.950	326.350
3rd place, bronze medalist(s)	Italy	68.650	64.950	61.250	60.850	37.650	30.500	323.850
4	Israel	61.400	63.550	62.000	62.100	38.150	32.650	319.850
5	Spain	66.250	64.100	61.150	57.750	35.600	33.000	317.850
6	Ukraine	62.550	61.650	62.300	61.350	34.800	32.600	315.250
7	China	61.500	58.350	59.550	60.700	36.900	33.150	310.150
8	Brazil	61.950	63.900	59.000	58.750	34.900	30.100	308.600
9	France	62.500	62.150	57.750	58.350	35.350	29.350	305.450
10	Uzbekistan	58.000	59.300	62.900	61.500	30.650	28.750	301.100
11	Hungary	64.050	61.800	58.550	61.450	32.000	22.350	300.200
12	Azerbaijan	57.600	60.400	57.100	56.250	31.700	32.200	295.250
13	Kazakhstan	60.200	64.000	59.700	57.800	30.300	21.450	293.450
14	United States	60.050	60.550	60.350	59.350	25.850	26.700	292.850
15	Greece	54.600	62.150	55.950	51.600	34.150	28.550	287.000
16	Japan	58.450	53.500	55.850	51.400	31.650	31.050	281.900

== Olympic quotas ==
The top 14 individual and 5 groups in the all-around earned group quotas for the 2024 Olympic Games.

Nation	Women's		Quotas	Athletes
Nation	Individual	Group	Quotas	Athletes
Bulgaria	1	0	1	1
Slovenia	1	0	1	1
Spain	2	0	2	2
Israel	1	0	1	1
Ukraine	1	1	2	6
Uzbekistan	1	0	1	1
Germany	1	0	1	1
Hungary	1	0	1	1
Azerbaijan	1	0	1	1
France	1	1	2	6
Brazil	1	1	2	6
Italy	1	1	2	6
Romania	1	0	1	1
China	0	1	1	5
Total:	14	5	19	39

== Medal table ==
* Host nation (Spain)

Rank	Nation	Gold	Silver	Bronze	Total
1	Germany	5	1	0	6
2	Israel	2	0	1	3
3	Bulgaria	1	2	1	4
4	China	1	2	0	3
5	Italy	0	3	2	5
6	Spain*	0	1	1	2
7	Ukraine	0	0	2	2
8	Hungary	0	0	1	1
8	Slovenia	0	0	1	1
Totals (9 entries)		9	9	9	27
