= Anja Kosan =

German rhythmic gymnast (born 2002)

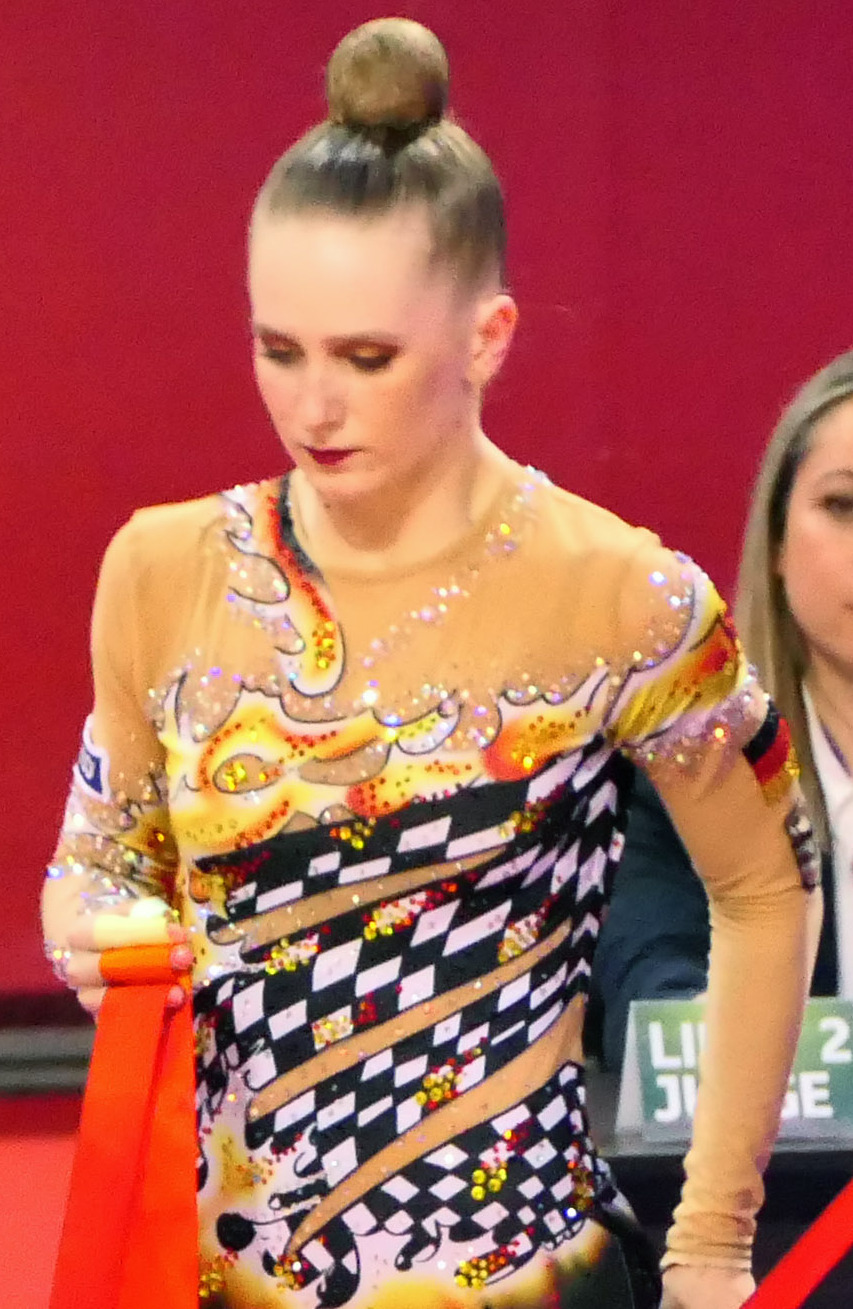

Personal information
- Full name: Anja Kosan
- Born: 12 December 2002 (age 23) Berlin, Germany

Gymnastics career
- Discipline: Rhythmic gymnastics
- Country represented: Germany; (2022-)
- Club: Berliner TSC
- Gym: Bundesstützpunkt Schmiden
- Head coach: Camilla Pfeffer
Medal record
Event	1st	2nd	3rd
World Championships	0	2	0
FIG World Cup	0	3	1
FIG World Challenge Cup	1	3	0
Total	1	8	1
Rhythmic Gymnastics
Representing Germany
World Championships
Gold medal – first place	2025 Rio de Janeiro	Team
Silver medal – second place	2022 Sofia	Team
Silver medal – second place	2023 Valencia	Team

Anja Kosan (born 12 December 2002) is a German rhythmic gymnast. She won silver in the senior team category at the 2022 World Championships.

== Personal life ==
In mid-2021 she moved from Berlin to Schmiden in Germany in order to train and study at the national gymnastics training centre, trying to achieve her dream of competing at the 2024 Olympic Games. "I didn't have to worry about finding accommodation either. I moved into a shared flat provided by the STB. The move was a little less stressful for me thanks to the help of my family. The new life at university was a bit difficult for me at first, as it is very different from school. In the meantime, however, I find my way around very well."

== Career ==
=== 2022 ===
Kosan was selected as a for the 2022 Rhythmic Gymnastics European Championships in Tel Aviv, Israel, the group came in 12th place in the all-around. In the team ranking (individual and group), the German team placed 5th. In late August Anja debuted in competition at the World Cup in Cluj-Napoca, winning bronze in the 3 ribbons + 2 balls' final.

The following month she participated at the 2022 World Championships in Sofia, Bulgaria, the group made mistakes in the 5 hoops routine (that was scored 25.950) relegated them in 14th place in the All-Around, but they qualified for the 3 ribbons + 2 balls' final with the 6th score, the same place they ended up in the final. Following Bulgaria and Israel's withdrawal Germany was able to medal in the team competition, Anja and her teammates Francine Schöning, Daniella Kromm, Alina Oganesyan, Hannah Vester and the two individuals Margarita Kolosov and Darja Varfolomeev were awarded silver for their results.

=== 2023 ===
In 2023, the group debuted at the World Cup in Athens, where they were 11th in the All-Around and 5th with 5 hoop. In Sofia they ended 9th in the All-Around. In April, the girls competed in Tashkent, where they won two silver medals in the All-Around and with 3 ribbons and 2 balls.

In August, she was selected for the 2023 World Championships in Valencia, Spain, helping the group earn a spot for the 2024 Olympics with an eighth-place all-around finish. Additionally, the group won a silver medal in the team event alongside Germany's individuals.

=== 2024 ===
In 2024, Kosan competed with the German group at the Sofia World Cup where they finished ninth in the all-around and seventh in the 3 ribbons and 2 balls final. Then at the World Cup stage in Tashkent, they finished eighth in the all-around and seventh in the 3 ribbons and 2 balls final. At the 2024 European Championships in Budapest, she and the German group placed seventh in the all-around, sixth in 5 hoops, and seventh in 3 ribbons and 2 balls. In June, the group competed at the final World Cup stage in Milan and finished sixth in the all-around. They also qualified for both event finals- placing sixth in 5 hoops and seventh in the 3 ribbons and 2 balls. They then competed at the Cluj-Napoca World Challenge Cup where they once again finished sixth in 5 hoops and seventh in the 3 ribbons and 2 balls.

Kosan was selected to represent Germany at the 2024 Summer Olympics alongside Emilia Wickert, Daniella Kromm, Alina Oganesyan, and Hannah Vester. The group finished 13th in the qualification round due to major mistakes in the 3 ribbons and 2 balls routine, failing to advance to the group all-around final.

=== 2025 ===
In August 2025, Kosan competed at the World Championships in Rio de Janeiro, Brazil, alongside Melanie Dargel, Olivia Falk, Helena Ripken, Anna-Maria Shatokhin and Emilia Wickert, where they took 8th place in all-around. Together with Darja Varfolomeev and Anastasia Simakova, they won the gold medal in team competition.

=== 2026 ===
In 2026, the group started its season competing at World Cup in Sofia, winning silver medal in the all-around. They were 5th in 5 balls and 4th in 3 hoops + 4 clubs final. In May, at the World Challenge Cup in Portimão they won silver in the all-around. In finals they won silver with 5 balls and gold with 3 hoops + 4 clubs. In the end of May, Kosan and her teammates competed at the 2026 European Championships in Varna, Bulgaria, where they placed 5th in all-around. They took 5th place in team competition together with individuals and 6th place in 3 hoops + 4 clubs due to loss of apparatus.

In June, they won silver in the all-around and 5 balls final at World Challenge Cup in Cluj-Napoca. They finished fourth in 3 hoops + 4 clubs final. In July, they competed at the World Cup Milan and ended in 10th place in the all-around and won silver medal in 3 hoops + 4 clubs final. In August, she was selected to compete alongside Alisa Datsenko, Alina Ott, Helena Ripken and Anna-Maria Shatokhin at the 2026 World Championships in Frankfurt. They took 4th place in group all-around and 4th place in team competition alongside Varfolomeev, Pusch and Simakova. They qualified to both apparatus finals, finishing 6th in 3 hoops + 4 clubs and 8th in 5 balls.
