= Hannah Vester =

German rhythmic gymnast (born 2006)

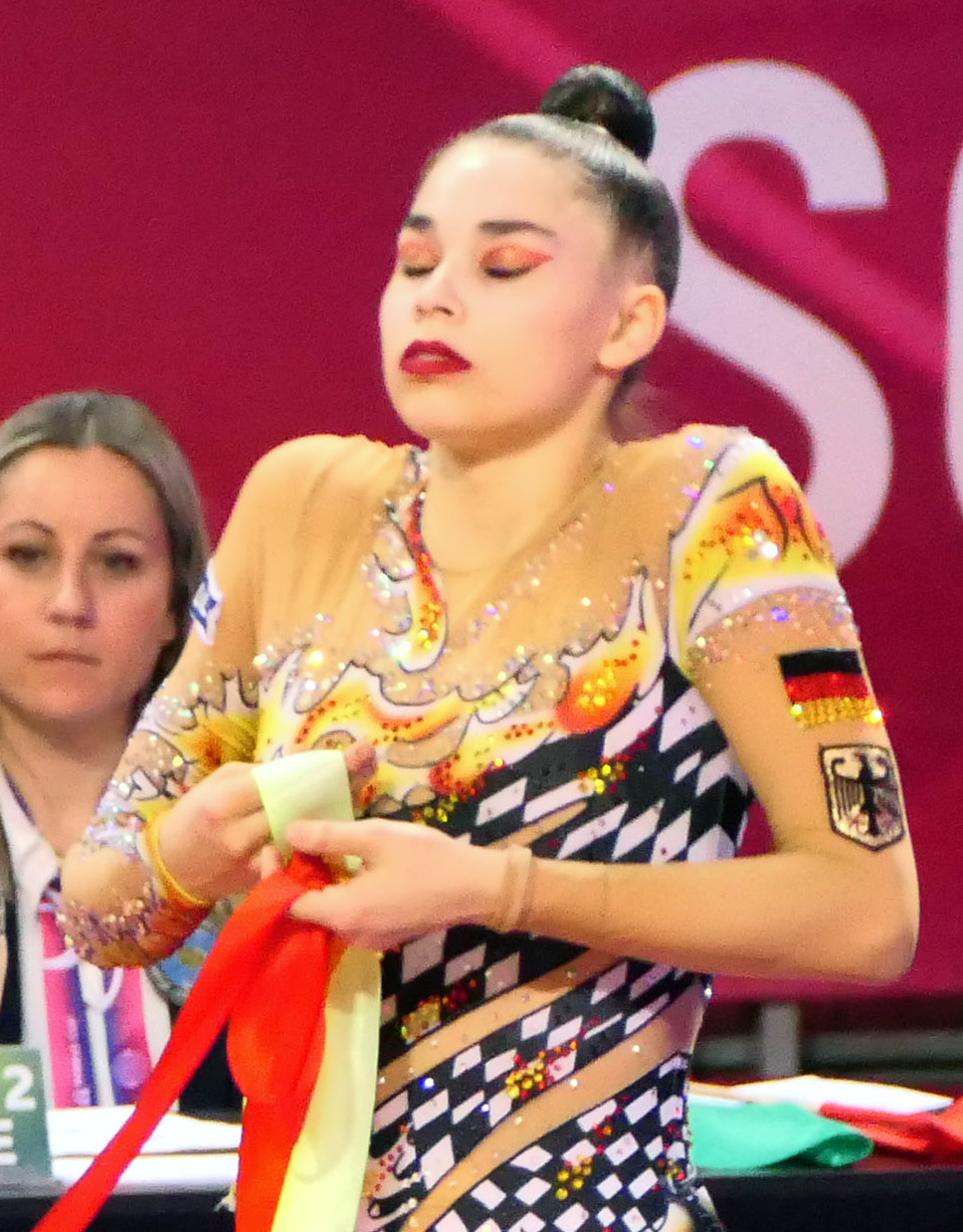

Personal information
- Born: 2 May 2006 (age 20) Zornheim, Germany

Gymnastics career
- Discipline: Rhythmic gymnastics
- Country represented: Germany; (2022-)
- Club: TB 1889 Oppau
- Head coach: Camilla Pfeffer
- Former coach: Judith Hauser
Medal record
Event	1st	2nd	3rd
World Championships	0	1	0
FIG World Cup	0	2	1
Total	0	3	1
Rhythmic Gymnastics
Representing Germany
World Championships
Silver medal – second place	2022 Sofia	Team
Silver medal – second place	2023 Valencia	Team

Hannah Vester (born 2 May 2006) is a German rhythmic gymnast. She won silver in the senior team category at the 2022 World Championships.

== Career ==
Vester made the move from being an individual training at TB 1889 Oppau to the rooster of the national group in February 2022, her first senior year. She was selected to perform in the 5 hoops exercise at the 2022 Rhythmic Gymnastics European Championships in Tel Aviv, Israel, scoring 30.150, the group came in 12th place in the all-around. In the team ranking (individual and group), the German team placed 5th. In late August she competed at the World Cup in Cluj-Napoca, winning bronze in the 3 ribbons + 2 balls' final. The following month she participated at the 2022 World Championships in Sofia, Bulgaria, the group made mistakes in the 5 hoops routine (that was scored 25.950) relegated them in 14th place in the All-Around, but they qualified for the 3 ribbons + 2 balls' final with the 6th score, the same place they ended up in the final. Following Bulgaria and Israel's withdrawal Germany was able to medal in the team competition, Hannah and her teammates Anja Kosan, Daniella Kromm, Alina Oganesyan, Francine Schöning and the two individuals Margarita Kolosov and Darja Varfolomeev were awarded silver for their results.

In 2023 the group debuted at the World Cup in Athens where they were 11th in the All-Around and 5th with 5 hoop. In Sofia they ended 9th in the All-Around. In April the girls competed in Tashkent where they won two silver medals in the All-Around and with 3 ribbons and 2 balls. In August, she was selected for the 2023 World Championships in Valencia, helping the group earn a spot for the 2024 Olympics with an eighth-place all-around finish. Additionally, the group won a silver medal in the team event alongside Germany's individuals.

Lester was selected to represent Germany at the 2024 Summer Olympics alongside Anja Kosan, Daniella Kromm, Alina Oganesyan, and Emilia Wickert. The group finished 13th in the qualification round due to major mistakes in the 3 ribbons and 2 balls routine, failing to advance to the group all-around final.

In 2025, she switched back to training in TB 1889 Oppau. She and her group won silver medal in group all-around and 5 ribbons and gold in 3 balls + 2 hoops at German National Championships.
