= Francine Schöning =

German rhythmic gymnast

- Born: 15 April 2005 (age 21) Berlin, Germany

Gymnastics career
- Discipline: Rhythmic gymnastics
- Country represented: Germany (2022-2024)
- Club: Berliner TSC
- Head coach: Camilla Pfeffer
Medal record
Event	1st	2nd	3rd
World Championships	0	1	0
FIG World Cup	0	2	1
Total	0	3	1
Rhythmic Gymnastics
Representing Germany
World Championships
Silver medal – second place	2022 Sofia	Team

Francine Schöning (born 15 April 2005) is a German rhythmic gymnast. She won silver in the senior team category at the 2022 World Championships.

== Personal life ==
In mid-2021 she moved from Berlin to Schmiden in Germany in order to train and study at the national gymnastics training centre. "I had no worries about looking for an apartment because I moved into the RSG boarding school. The move to Schmiden, like any other move, was of course stressful. Saying goodbye to the Poelchau High School in Berlin was very difficult for me, but I slowly got used to the school system here."

== Career ==
She was selected as a reserve for the 2022 Rhythmic Gymnastics European Championships in Tel Aviv, Israel, the group came in 12th place in the all-around. In the team ranking (individual and group), the German team placed 5th. In late August Schöning debuted in competition at the World Cup in Cluj-Napoca, winning bronze in the 3 ribbons + 2 balls' final. The following month Francine participated at the 2022 World Championships in Sofia, Bulgaria, the group made mistakes in the 5 hoops routine (that was scored 25.950) relegated them in 14th place in the All-Around, but they qualified for the 3 ribbons + 2 balls' final with the 6th score, the same place they ended up in the final. Following Bulgaria and Israel's withdrawal Germany was able to medal in the team competition, Francine and her teammates Anja Kosan, Daniella Kromm, Alina Oganesyan, Hannah Vester and the two individuals Margarita Kolosov and Darja Varfolomeev were awarded silver for their results.

In 2023 the group debuted at the World Cup in Athens where they were 11th in the All-Around and 5th with 5 hoop. In Sofia they ended 9th in the All-Around. In April the girls competed in Tashkent where they won two silver medals in the All-Around and with 3 ribbons and 2 balls.
