= Kromm =

Kromm is a surname. Notable people with the surname include:

- Bobby Kromm (1928–2010), Canadian ice hockey player
- Daniella Kromm (born 2004), German rhythmic gymnast
- Richard Kromm (born 1964), Canadian-born American ice hockey player
- Robert Kromm (born 1984), German volleyball player

== See also ==
- Fromm
