= Daniella Kromm =

German rhythmic gymnast (born 2004)

- Full name: Daniella Kromm
- Born: 17 February 2004 (age 22) Waiblingen, Germany

Gymnastics career
- Discipline: Rhythmic gymnastics
- Country represented: Germany; (2019-2024)
- Club: TSV Schmiden
- Gym: Bundesstützpunkt Schmiden
- Head coach: Camilla Pfeffer
- Retired: yes
Medal record
Event	1st	2nd	3rd
World Championships	0	2	0
FIG World Cup	0	2	1
Total	0	3	1
Rhythmic Gymnastics
Representing Germany
World Championships
Silver medal – second place	2022 Sofia	Team
Silver medal – second place	2023 Valencia	Team

Daniella Kromm (born 17 February 2004) is a retired German rhythmic gymnast. She won silver in the senior team category at the 2022 World Championships.

== Personal life ==
Her younger sister Leonille is also a rhythmic gymnast in the German national team.

== Career ==
=== Junior ===
Kromm was part of the German junior group that competed at both the 2019 European and World Championships, finishing 12th in Baku and 10th in Moscow.

=== Senior ===
Daniela integrated the senior group in 2021, training seven hours a day at the Fellbach-Schmiden federal training centre, competing at the World Championships, finishing 7th in the All-Around.

In 2022 she was selected to perform at the 2022 Rhythmic Gymnastics European Championships in Tel Aviv, Israel, the group came in 12th place in the all-around. In the team ranking (individual and group), the German team placed 5th. In late August she competed at the World Cup in Cluj-Napoca, winning bronze in the 3 ribbons + 2 balls' final. The following month she participated at the 2022 World Championships in Sofia, Bulgaria, the group made mistakes in the 5 hoops routine (that was scored 25.950) relegated them in 14th place in the All-Around, but they qualified for the 3 ribbons + 2 balls' final with the 6th score, the same place they ended up in the final. Following Bulgaria and Israel's withdrawal Germany was able to medal in the team competition, Daniela and her teammates Anja Kosan, Alina Oganesyan, Hannah Vester, Francine Schöning and the two individuals Margarita Kolosov and Darja Varfolomeev were awarded silver for their results.

In 2023 the group debuted at the World Cup in Athens where they were 11th in the All-Around and 5th with 5 hoop. In Sofia they ended 9th in the All-Around. In April the girls competed in Tashkent where they won two silver medals in the All-Around and with 3 ribbons and 2 balls.

Kromm was selected to represent Germany at the 2024 Summer Olympics alongside Anja Kosan, Emilia Wickert, Alina Oganesyan, and Hannah Vester. The group finished 13th in the qualification round due to major mistakes in the 3 ribbons and 2 balls routine, failing to advance to the group all-around final.
