= Emilia Wickert =

German rhythmic gymnast (born 2007)

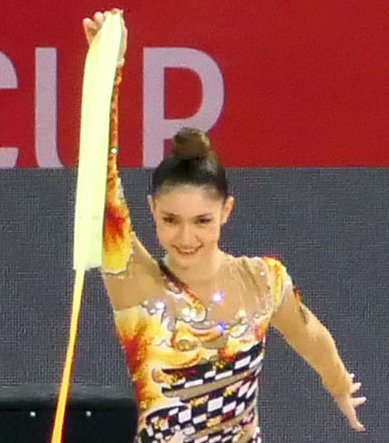
- Wickert in 2024

Personal information
- Nickname: Emi
- Born: 25 January 2007 (age 19) Ulm, Germany

Gymnastics career
- Discipline: Rhythmic gymnastics
- Country represented: Germany; (2023 - present)
- Club: TSG Söflingen
- Head coach: Camilla Pfeffer
Medal record
Rhythmic Gymnastics
Representing Germany
Event	1st	2nd	3rd
FIG World Cup	0	1	0
FIG World Challenge Cup	1	3	0
Total	1	4	0
World Championships
Gold medal – first place	2025 Rio de Janeiro	Team
Silver medal – second place	2023 Valencia	Team
European Championships
Bronze medal – third place	2025 Tallinn	3 Balls + 2 Hoops

Emilia Wickert (born 25 January 2007) is a German rhythmic gymnast. She is the 2025 World team gold medalist and represented Germany at the 2024 Summer Olympics in group event.

== Early life ==
Wickert was born in Ulm to parents Heinrich and Yi. Her mother, Yi, competed in rhythmic gymnastics at the Asian Championships. She was inspired by her mother to begin rhythmic gymnastics in 2013. She speaks German, Latin, Mandarin and Shanghai dialect.

In 2026 she has enrolled at Jinan University in Guangzhou as undergraduate in International journalism and communication.

== Career ==
After competing for TSG Söflingen, Wickert joined the senior national group in 2023. She debuted at the World Cup in Cluj-Napoca where Germany was sixth in the all-around, fourth with 5 hoops, and fifth with 3 ribbons and 2 balls. Later that month, the group was seventh in the all-around and eighth in both finals at the stage in Milan. In August, she was selected for the 2023 World Championships in Valencia, helping the group earn a spot for the 2024 Olympics with an eighth-place all-around finish. Additionally, the group won a silver medal in the team event alongside Germany's individuals.

Wickert competed with the German group at the 2024 Sofia World Cup where they finished ninth in the all-around and seventh in the 3 ribbons and 2 balls final. Then at the World Cup stage in Tashkent, they finished eighth in the all-around and seventh in the 3 ribbons and 2 balls final. At the 2024 European Championships, Wickert and the German group placed seventh in the all-around, sixth in 5 hoops, and seventh in 3 ribbons and 2 balls. In June, the group competed at the final World Cup stage in Milan and finished sixth in the all-around. They also qualified for both event finals- placing sixth in 5 hoops and seventh in the 3 ribbons and 2 balls. They then competed at the Cluj-Napoca World Challenge Cup where they once again finished sixth in 5 hoops and seventh in the 3 ribbons and 2 balls. Wickert was selected to represent Germany at the 2024 Summer Olympics alongside Anja Kosan, Daniella Kromm, Alina Oganesyan, and Hannah Vester. The group finished 13th in the qualification round due to major mistakes in the 3 ribbons and 2 balls routine, failing to advance to the group all-around final.

At the 2025 European Championships in Tallinn, Wickert and the German group placed 10th in the all-around and won bronze medail in 3 balls + 2 hoops final. In August, Wickert competed at the 2025 World Championships in Rio de Janeiro, Brazil, alongside Melanie Dargel, Anja Kosan, Helena Ripken, Anna-Maria Shatokhin and Olivia Falk, where they took 8th place in all-around. Together with Darja Varfolomeev and Anastasia Simakova, they won the gold medal in team competition.

In 2026 the group started its season at the World Cup in Sofia, winning silver in the all-around. They were 5th in 5 balls and 4th in 3 hoops + 4 clubs final. At the World Challenge Cup in Portimão she won silver in the All-Around and with 5 balls as well as gold with 3 hoops & 4 clubs. In the end of May, Wickert and her teammates competed at the 2026 European Championships in Varna, Bulgaria, where they placed 5th in all-around. They took 5th place in team competition together with individuals and 6th place in 3 hoops + 4 clubs due to loss of apparatus. In Cluj-Napoca they won silver in the All-Around. In July, they competed at the World Cup Milan and ended in 10th place in the all-around and won silver medal in 3 hoops + 4 clubs final.
