= Fausta Šostakaitė =

Lithuanian rhythmic gymnast

- Born: June 22, 2004 (age 22) Vilnius, Lithuania

Gymnastics career
- Discipline: Rhythmic gymnastics
- Country represented: Lithuania; (2018-)
- Club: EM Talents
- Head coach: Erika Cipkiene
- Last updated on: 23 July 2025.

Fausta Šostakaitė (born 22 June 2004) is Lithuanian rhythmic gymnast. She represents her country in international competitions.

On national level, she is a four-time (2021–2024) Lithuanian National All-around champion in senior category.

== Career ==
Born in Vilnius.

=== Junior ===
She competed at the 2018 Junior European Championships in Guadalajara, Spain, where she placed 27th in Hoop, 36th in Ball, 42nd in Clubs and 38th in Ribbon Qualifications. A year later, she took part in the 2019 Junior World Championships as a part of Lithuanian team, which took 10th place in Team ranking. She was competing with Rope (18th place) and Ribbon (31st place).

=== Senior ===
She debuted as a senior in 2020. In October, she was chosen to represent Lithuania at the 2020 European Championships in Kyiv, Ukraine. She took 19th place in All-around.

In 2021, she made her World Cup debut at World Cup Sofia in March, where she ended on 49th place in All-around. One month later she competed at World Cup Baku and took 54th place in All-around. On July 2–4, she competed at World Challenge Cup Minsk and placed 16th in All-around. Her best apparatus was Ribbon (13th place). Fausta represented Lithuania at the 2021 European Championships in Varna, Bulgaria. She ended on 43rd place in All-around Qualifications. She competed at International Tournament “Gdynia Rhythmic Stars” in Gdynia, Poland. She scored 76.100 points and took 7th place in All-around. Later that year, she competed at the 2021 MTM FIG Tournament in Ljubljana, Slovenia and won bronze medal in All-around. She also won gold medals in Ball (20.900 points) and Clubs (21.350). In Ribbon Final, she was 6th (14.850), and in Hoop 7th (18.000). At her first World Championships, held in Kitakyushu, Japan, she ended on 39th place in All-around.

In 2022, she competed at Miss Valentine Grand Prix held in Tartu, Estonia and ended on 6th place in All-around. She was 4th in Hoop (26.300), 5th in Clubs (27.500), 6th in Ribbon (23.100), and 8th in Ball Final (25.100). She took 50th place in All-around Qualifications at the 2022 World Championships in Sofia, Bulgaria. Sostakaite took 10th place in All-around at Grand Prix Brno.

In 2023, she again competed at Miss Valentine Grand Prix held in Tartu, Estonia and ended on 11th place in All-around. Fausta took part in the 35th MTM FIG Tournament in Ljubljana, Slovenia and won bronze medal in All-around behind Italian Tara Dragas and Isabelle Tavano. She competed at the 2023 European Championships in Baku, Azerbaijan and took 35th place in All-around. She was most successful with Ribbon (25th place in Qualifications). She represented Lithuania at the 2023 World Championships in Valenia, Spain, and ended on 40th place in All-around Qualifications.

In 2024, she once again became a National all-around champion in senior category, tied with Diana Artiomova. They both scored 109.467 points in All-around. At Miss Valentine Grand Prix held in Tartu, Estonia she placed 14th in All-around. She represented Lithuania at the 2024 European Championships in Budapest, Hungary, together with teammates Skaiste Razokaite and Milana Tricolici. She competed with Hoop (42nd) and Ball (36th place) in Qualifications.

In 2025, she won silver medal in All-around behind Milana Tricolici at the 2025 Lithuanian Championships in Gargždai. On 17–19 July, she took 32nd place in the all-around at the 2025 Summer Universiade in Essen.

== Routine music information ==
Year	Apparatus	Music title
2023	Hoop	Royal Blood (The Redeem Team) by Caleb Swift
2023	Ball	Alcoba Azul by Elliot Goldenthal
2023	Clubs	Athena, Samb-Adagio by Safri Duo
2023	Ribbon	The Illusionist by Maxime Rodriguez
2022	Hoop	Carol of the Bells by Libera (Christmas album)
2022	Ball	Runnin' (Lose It All) by Naughty Boy, Beyonce, Arrow Benjamin
2022	Clubs	Mechanisms by Kirill Richter
2022	Ribbon	The Illusionist by Maxime Rodriguez
2020/2021	Hoop	Come, Gentle Night (from Romeo and Juliet) by Abel Korzeniowski
2020/2021	Ball	Strange Birds by Birdy
2020/2021	Clubs	Daft Punk by Pentatonix
2020/2021	Ribbon	The Plaza Of Execution, Stealing The Map (from The Mask of Zorro) by James Horner
2019	Rope	Ma fiancée, elle est partie by Dany Brillant
2019	Ball	Wolf Pack by Bachar Mar-Khalifé
2019	Clubs	unknown
2019	Ribbon	Carmen Suite: Carmen's Entrance and Habanera by Gennady Rozhdestvensky, String Section of Bolshoi Theatre Orchestra
