= Alma Pedersen =

Danish rhythmic gymnast (born 2005)

- Full name: Alma Sofie Højgaard Pedersen
- Born: July 6, 2005 (age 21) Egedal, Denmark

Gymnastics career
- Discipline: Rhythmic gymnastics
- Country represented: Denmark; (2017-)
- Club: TIK-Gymnastik

Alma Sofie Pedersen (born 6 July 2005) is a Danish rhythmic gymnast. She represents her country in international competitions.

== Personal life ==
Pedersen took up rhythmic gymnastics at age 4, as of 2022 she trains 22 hours a week. Her idol are Russian rhythmic gymnast Yana Kudryavtseva. Outside the gym, Alma's hobbies are spending time with friends and family and playing with her dog. She and her Danish teammate Isabella Schultz won the Taastrup Trophy at the 2022 Taastrup Sports Club [TIK] Awards for their performances at the previous year's Nordic championships.

== Career ==
In 2019 Alma was the Danish representative at the 1st Junior Rhythmic Gymnastics Championships in Moscow, she was 58th with rope, 45th with ball, 37th with clubs and 53rd with ribbon.

In 2022 she made her senior international debut at the World Championships in Sofia where she finished 77th in the All-Around, 79th with hoop, 61st with ball, 79th with clubs and 78th with ribbon.
