= 2022 Rhythmic Gymnastics World Championships =

- Venue: Armeets Arena
- Location: Sofia, Bulgaria
- Dates: 14–18 September 2022
- Competitors: 234 from 62 nations
- Website: Official website

The 2022 Rhythmic Gymnastics World Championships were held from 14 to 18 September 2022 in Sofia, Bulgaria.

The competition was used to determine the first quotas given for the 2024 Summer Olympics. The three medalists in the individual and group all-around won quotas for their countries.

Notable absences included all Russian and Belarusian gymnasts, who were not allowed to compete after the 2022 Russian invasion of Ukraine. Both countries were traditionally dominant in rhythmic gymnastics; a Russian gymnast had won every World all-around title since 2007, when Ukrainian Anna Bessonova won. In addition, two favorites for the individual event, the European champion, Daria Atamanov, and the European silver medalist, Boryana Kaleyn, both withdrew shortly before the event for health reasons. Atamanov broke her leg performing a jump during her warm-up a few minutes before she was to compete, while Kaleyn was hospitalized with a high fever.

In part due to the absence of Russian and Belarusian gymnasts, several gymnasts won the first World medals for their countries at the competition. In the individual event, victor Sofia Raffaeli from Italy became the first Italian individual gymnast to win an all-around medal at the World Championships as well as the first Italian all-around champion. Darja Varfolomeev, the silver medalist, was the first German gymnast to win an all-around medal since the reunification of Germany; in the event finals, she won the first gold medal by a German gymnast. Bronze medalist Stiliana Nikolova was the first Bulgarian individual to win an all-around medal in over twenty years.

Ekaterina Vedeneeva won Slovenia's first World medal, a bronze in the ribbon final. Marina Malpica was the first Mexican gymnast to compete in the all-around final. In the group event, the Israeli group won their country's first group medal with silver in the all-around, and the Azerbaijani group also won their country's first World group medal, a bronze in the mixed apparatus event.

Neviana Vladinova was the ambassador for the event.

== Participating countries ==
Based on the results at the previous continental championships, each International Gymnastics Federation member could submit either one individual, or two or three individuals, with all quotas being non-nominative. The quotas allocated differed per continent, with Europe having the most allocated quotas and Oceania the least. The maximum number of entries was 105 gymnasts. Every member nation could enter one group.

Participants	Nations
Group + 3 individuals	Australia Azerbaijan China South Korea Ukraine Uzbekistan
Group + 2 individuals	Brazil Spain France Germany Greece Hungary Italy Japan Kazakhstan United States
Group + 1 individual	Armenia Bulgaria Czech Republic Estonia Finland Georgia Israel Mexico Poland Portugal Chinese Taipei Turkey
Group	Venezuela
3 individuals	Canada
2 individuals	Latvia Romania
1 individual	Andorra Angola Argentina Austria Belgium Bosnia and Herzegovina Colombia Croatia Cyprus Denmark Egypt Great Britain Hong Kong Kyrgyzstan Lithuania Luxembourg Moldova Mongolia New Zealand Philippines South Africa Singapore Slovenia San Marino Serbia Sri Lanka Switzerland Slovakia Sweden Thailand

== Schedule ==
- Wednesday, September 14
  - 09:30 - 19:10 Individual Qualification - Hoop and Ball
  - 20:20 - 21:00 Opening Ceremony
  - 21:00 - 21:35 Individual Hoop Final
  - 21:42 - 22:17 Individual Ball Final
- Thursday, September 15
  - 09:30 - 19:16 Individual Qualification - Clubs and Ribbon
  - 21:00 - 21:35 Individual Clubs Final
  - 21:42 - 22:17 Individual Ribbon Final
- Friday, September 16
  - 14:30 - 18:55 Group All Around
- Saturday, September 17
  - 14:45 - 19:31 Individual All Around Final
- Sunday, September 18
  - 15:00 - 15:43 Group 5 Hoops Final
  - 15:48 - 16:31 Group 3 Ribbons + 2 Balls Final
  - 17:15 - 18:00 Closing Ceremony

== Medal summary ==
Event	Gold	Silver	Bronze
Team Competition
Team All-Around	Italy; Individuals; Milena Baldassarri; Sofia Raffaeli; Group; Martina Centofanti; Agnese Duranti; Alessia Maurelli; Daniela Mogurean; Laura Paris; Martina Santandrea	Germany; Individuals; Margarita Kolosov; Darja Varfolomeev; Group; Anja Kosan; Daniella Kromm; Alina Oganesyan; Francine Schöning; Hannah Vester	Spain; Individuals; Alba Bautista; Polina Berezina; Group; Ana Arnau; Inés Bergua; Valeria Márquez; Mireia Martínez; Patricia Pérez; Salma Solaun
Individual Finals
All-Around	(Italy) Sofia Raffaeli	(Germany) Darja Varfolomeev	(Bulgaria) Stiliana Nikolova
Hoop	(Italy) Sofia Raffaeli	(Bulgaria) Stiliana Nikolova	(Germany) Darja Varfolomeev
Ball	(Italy) Sofia Raffaeli	(Germany) Darja Varfolomeev	(Italy) Milena Baldassarri
Clubs	(Germany) Darja Varfolomeev	(Bulgaria) Stiliana Nikolova	(Italy) Sofia Raffaeli
Ribbon	(Italy) Sofia Raffaeli	(Bulgaria) Stiliana Nikolova	(Slovenia) Ekaterina Vedeneeva
Groups Finals
Group All-Around	Bulgaria; Sofia Ivanova; Kamelia Petrova; Rachel Stoyanov; Radina Tomova; Zhenina Trashlieva; Margarita Vasileva	Israel; Shani Bakanov; Adar Friedmann; Romi Paritzki; Ofir Shaham; Diana Svertsov	Spain; Ana Arnau; Inés Bergua; Valeria Márquez; Mireia Martínez; Patricia Pérez; Salma Solaun
5 Hoops	Italy; Martina Centofanti; Agnese Duranti; Alessia Maurelli; Daniela Mogurean; Laura Paris; Martina Santandrea*	Israel; Shani Bakanov; Adar Friedmann; Romi Paritzki; Ofir Shaham; Diana Svertsov	Spain; Ana Arnau; Inés Bergua; Valeria Márquez*; Mireia Martínez; Patricia Pérez; Salma Solaun
3 Ribbons + 2 Balls	Bulgaria; Sofia Ivanova; Kamelia Petrova; Rachel Stoyanov; Radina Tomova; Zhenina Trashlieva; Margarita Vasileva*	Italy; Martina Centofanti; Agnese Duranti; Alessia Maurelli; Daniela Mogurean; Laura Paris*; Martina Santandrea	Azerbaijan; Gullu Aghalarzade; Laman Alimuradova; Kamilla Aliyeva*; Zeynab Hummatova; Yelyzaveta Luzan; Darya Sorokina

* reserve gymnast

== Individual ==
=== Individual Qualification ===
- The top 8 scores in individual apparatus qualify to the apparatus finals and the top 18 in overall qualification scores advance to the all-around final.

Rank	Gymnast	Nation	Hoop (rhythmic gymnastics)	Ball (rhythmic gymnastics)	Clubs (rhythmic gymnastics)	Ribbon (rhythmic gymnastics)	Total	
1	Sofia Raffaeli	Italy	32.450 (3)	33.900 (1)	31.000 (7)	32.500 (1)	98.850	Q
2	Stiliana Nikolova	Bulgaria	34.150 (1)	30.300 (11)	32.650 (1)	31.400 (2)	98.200	Q
3	Darja Varfolomeev	Germany	32.300 (4)	32.650 (2)	31.100 (4)	29.150 (10)	96.050	Q
4	Margarita Kolosov	Germany	32.450 (2)	30.100 (12)	30.800 (8)	28.850 (14)	93.350	Q
5	Viktoriia Onopriienko	Ukraine	30.250 (13)	32.000 (4)	31.050 (6)	28.750 (16)	93.300	Q
6	Ekaterina Vedeneeva	Slovenia	30.800 (9)	30.700 (7)	31.600 (2)	29.750 (5)	93.100	Q
7	Adi Asya Katz	Israel	31.200 (5)	30.850 (5)	30.650 (9)	29.650 (7)	92.700	Q
8	Milena Baldassarri	Italy	31.200 (6)	32.100 (3)	29.350 (15)	28.000 (20)	92.650	Q
9	Alba Bautista	Spain	28.950 (17)	30.750 (6)	30.500 (10)	30.400 (3)	91.650	Q
10	Zohra Aghamirova	Azerbaijan	30.850 (8)	29.400 (17)	30.450 (11)	29.950 (4)	91.250	Q
11	Takhmina Ikromova	Uzbekistan	30.700 (10)	29.350 (19)	31.050 (5)	29.100 (11)	91.100	Q
12	Annaliese Dragan	Romania	28.600 (22)	29.800 (13)	31.300 (3)	29.600 (8)	90.700	Q
13	Fanni Pigniczki	Hungary	28.500 (23)	30.550 (10)	29.250 (16)	29.700 (6)	89.500	Q
14	Elzhana Taniyeva	Kazakhstan	30.650 (11)	29.400 (18)	29.450 (13)	26.950 (29)	89.500	Q
15	Evita Griskenas	United States	31.050 (7)	29.300 (22)	28.050 (26)	29.050 (12)	89.400	Q
16	Lili Mizuno	United States	28.950 (19)	30.700 (9)	29.350 (14)	26.700 (31)	89.000	Q
17	Marina Malpica	Mexico	29.400 (14)	29.650 (14)	28.500 (22)	26.250 (35)	87.550	Q
18	Zhao Yating	China	29.200 (15)	29.400 (16)	28.750 (19)	21.250 (67)	87.350	Q
19	Andreea Verdes	Romania	28.450 (24)	30.700 (8)	28.050 (26)	26.100 (38)	87.200	R1
20	Polina Berezina	Spain	26.350 (44)	29.300 (21)	28.800 (18)	28.850 (14)	86.950	R2
21	Yosmina Rakhimova	Uzbekistan	28.400 (25)	29.200 (23)		29.300 (9)	86.900	R3
22	Helene Karbanov	France	30.400 (12)	28.650 (26)	26.650 (40)	27.250 (27)	86.300	R4
23	Geovanna Santos	Brazil	27.850 (33)	27.100 (42)	29.700 (12)	28.550 (18)	86.100	
24	Aibota Yertaikyzy	Kazakhstan	28.950 (18)	28.450 (29)	28.400 (24)	28.700 (17)	86.100	
25	Panagiota Lytra	Greece	29.050 (16)	28.050 (33)	28.500 (21)	27.700 (25)	85.600	
26	Maelle Millet	France	28.650 (21)	28.950 (24)	27.550 (30)	27.900 (22)	85.500	
27	Hanna Panna Wiesner	Hungary	28.200 (27)	27.150 (41)	29.000 (17)	27.700 (24)	84.900	
28	Małgorzata Roszatycka	Poland	25.400 (47)	28.550 (27)	27.000 (33)	29.050 (13)	84.600	
29	Polina Karika	Ukraine	27.950 (30)	29.350 (20)	26.900 (34)		84.200	
30	Alexandra Kiroi-Bogatyreva	Australia	26.850 (41)	28.950 (25)	27.700 (29)	26.250 (34)	83.500	
31	Anna Sokolova	Cyprus	27.950 (29)	28.500 (28)	26.850 (36)	26.050 (39)	83.300	
32	Sumire Kita	Japan	26.900 (40)	26.600 (47)	28.400 (23)	27.900 (23)	83.200	
33	Aino Yamada	Japan	27.900 (31)	27.650 (38)	25.650 (46)	27.550 (26)	83.100	
34	Sol Martinez Fainberg	Argentina	28.950 (20)	25.650 (50)	28.250 (25)	25.450 (45)	82.850	
35	Suzanna Shahbazian	Canada	27.700 (35)	28.250 (30)	26.800 (38)		82.750	
36	Carmel Kallemaa	Canada	27.050 (37)	27.050 (43)	28.500 (20)	26.500 (33)	82.600	
37	Elisabeth Jamil	Finland	26.450 (43)	28.200 (31)	27.750 (28)	24.200 (52)	82.400	
38	Kamelya Tuncel	Turkey	28.100 (28)	27.350 (40)	26.800 (39)	26.800 (30)	82.250	
39	Livia Maria Chiariello	Switzerland	27.500 (36)	27.950 (34)	25.700 (44)	26.050 (40)	81.500	
40	Yue Zhao	China	27.900 (32)	29.450 (15)		24.050 (54)	81.400	
41	Barbara Domingos	Brazil	24.500 (54)	28.100 (32)	25.150 (50)	27.950 (21)	81.200	
42	Melany Keler	Estonia	28.400 (26)	26.750 (45)	25.700 (45)	26.050 (41)	81.200	
43	Sohn Ji-in	Korea	25.800 (46)	27.700 (36)	25.400 (48)		78.900	
44	Maria Dervisi	Greece	22.950 (70)	27.500 (39)	26.850 (35)	24.450 (50)	78.800	
45	Aliaa Saleh	Egypt	26.600 (42)	27.700 (37)	24.250 (56)	23.750 (58)	78.550	
46	Rita Araujo	Portugal	23.250 (69)	25.800 (49)	26.250 (42)	25.800 (43)	77.850	
47	Nikola Vasiljeva	Latvia	25.100 (51)	21.600 (77)	26.100 (43)	26.550 (32)	77.750	
48	Ketevan Arbolishvili	Georgia	23.450 (65)	26.800 (44)	24.350 (54)	26.200 (36)	77.350	
49	Michaela Zatkova	Slovakia	23.750 (62)	25.150 (54)	26.450 (41)	25.300 (46)	76.900	
50	Fausta Sostakaite	Lithuania	25.150 (49)	25.350 (52)	23.450 (61)	25.550 (44)	76.050	
51	Tamara Artic	Croatia	23.300 (68)	24.850 (56)	25.400 (47)	25.250 (47)	75.500	
52	Lina Dussan	Colombia	25.200 (48)	26.600 (46)	23.100 (64)	22.000 (65)	74.900	
53	Havana Hopman	New Zealand	22.650 (72)	23.950 (62)	25.300 (49)	24.950 (48)	74.200	
54	Valentina Domenig-Ozimic	Austria	24.300 (57)	25.250 (53)	24.650 (51)	22.100 (64)	74.200	
55	Yewon Lee	Korea		26.500 (48)	23.300 (63)	24.300 (51)	74.100	
56	Nikolina Lekovic	Serbia	24.050 (59)	24.700 (58)	24.500 (52)	21.650 (66)	73.250	
57	Santa Stepulane	Latvia	23.300 (67)	24.900 (55)	22.950 (65)	24.800 (49)	73.000	
58	Alessia Verstappen	Belgium	25.050 (52)	23.450 (65)	24.450 (53)	22.300 (62)	72.950	
59	Denisa Stepankova	Czechia	24.400 (56)	24.850 (57)	23.650 (58)	18.500 (77)	72.900	
60	Sophie Turpel	Luxembourg	22.750 (71)	23.850 (63)	24.300 (55)	23.850 (56)	72.000	
61	Piyada Peeramatukorn	Thailand	23.500 (63)	24.150 (60)	23.600 (59)	24.200 (53)	71.950	
62	Alva Svennbeck	Sweden	25.150 (50)	23.000 (69)	22.150 (69)	23.750 (57)	71.900	
63	Katelin Wie Qi Heng	Singapore	24.750 (53)	22.650 (70)	23.300 (62)	22.850 (60)	70.900	
64	Undram Khashbat	Mongolia	24.150 (58)	24.400 (59)	21.650 (70)	20.800 (70)	70.200	
65	Tzu-Wen Li	Chinese Taipei	23.400 (66)	22.600 (73)	24.150 (57)	20.150 (74)	70.150	
66	Breanna Labadan	Philippines	23.950 (60)	22.450 (75)	20.650 (76)	23.450 (59)	69.850	
67	Anna-Marie Ondaatje	Sri Lanka	23.450 (64)	23.400 (66)	22.300 (67)	20.000 (75)	69.150	
68	Sevara Khaitova	Kyrgyzstan	23.750 (61)	23.300 (68)	21.650 (71)	20.150 (73)	68.700	
69	Veronica Sturmilova	Moldova	24.450 (55)	22.500 (74)	21.050 (73)	15.600 (79)	68.000	
70	Berta Miquel	Andorra	21.750 (75)	23.750 (64)	22.300 (68)	21.150 (68)	67.800	
71	Luana Gomes	Angola	20.350 (77)	22.600 (72)	18.500 (78)	23.950 (55)	66.900	
72	Lai Chun Cheng	Hong Kong	22.400 (73)	22.600 (71)	20.800 (75)	20.400 (72)	65.800	
73	Matilde Tamagnini	San Marino	22.150 (74)	18.950 (79)	22.450 (66)	20.650 (71)	65.250	
74	Yulia Galukhin	South Africa	20.100 (78)	21.250 (78)	20.950 (74)	22.200 (63)	64.400	
75	Amila Becirovic	Bosnia and Herzegovina	20.650 (76)	18.000 (80)	19.000 (77)	22.700 (61)	62.350	
76	Meri Poghosyan	Armenia	18.600 (80)	21.750 (76)	21.450 (72)	18.650 (76)	61.850	
77	Alma Pedersen	Denmark	19.450 (79)	24.000 (61)	18.250 (79)	18.350 (78)	61.800	
–	Ilona Zeynalova	Azerbaijan			27.000 (32)	27.050 (28)	54.050	
–	Joowon Kim	Korea	27.700 (34)			26.000 (42)	53.700	
–	Alina Gozalova	Azerbaijan	27.000 (39)	25.550 (51)			52.550	
–	Asya Seker	Australia	26.150 (45)		23.500 (60)		49.650	
–	Isabella Wang	Australia		23.300 (67)		21.050 (69)	44.350	
–	Polina Horodnycha	Ukraine				28.250 (19)	28.250	
–	Li Huilin	China			27.400 (31)		27.400	
–	Asal Akhmedova	Uzbekistan			26.850 (37)		26.850	
–	Tatiana Cocsanova	Canada				26.100 (37)	26.100	
DNF	Marfa Ekimova	Great Britain	27.050 (38)	27.800 (35)			DNF	
DNS	Daria Atamanov	Israel					DNS	
DNS	Boryana Kaleyn	Bulgaria					DNS	

=== All-Around ===
Rank	Gymnast	Nation	Hoop (rhythmic gymnastics)	Ball (rhythmic gymnastics)	Clubs (rhythmic gymnastics)	Ribbon (rhythmic gymnastics)	Total
1st place, gold medalist(s)	Sofia Raffaeli	Italy	33.800 (1)	34.250 (1)	32.250 (3)	32.950 (1)	133.250
2nd place, silver medalist(s)	Darja Varfolomeev	Germany	32.850 (4)	33.400 (2)	33.750 (1)	32.450 (2)	132.450
3rd place, bronze medalist(s)	Stiliana Nikolova	Bulgaria	33.450 (2)	32.600 (4)	32.600 (2)	30.150 (4)	128.800
4	Viktoriia Onopriienko	Ukraine	33.050 (3)	31.100 (7)	32.000 (4)	28.900 (7)	125.050
5	Milena Baldassarri	Italy	31.500 (8)	31.300 (6)	31.800 (5)	30.300 (3)	124.900
6	Adi Asya Katz	Israel	31.900 (5)	31.300 (5)	31.500 (7)	29.750 (6)	124.450
7	Ekaterina Vedeneeva	Slovenia	31.650 (7)	30.600 (9)	31.150 (8)	29.750 (5)	123.150
8	Elzhana Taniyeva	Kazakhstan	29.700	32.850 (3)	31.650 (6)	26.800	121.000
9	Fanni Pigniczki	Hungary	30.950 (9)	31.100 (8)	30.150 (10)	28.100	120.300
10	Evita Griskenas	United States	31.900 (6)	29.550	29.700	28.800 (8)	119.950
11	Takhmina Ikromova	Uzbekistan	30.850 (10)	30.350	28.950	28.400 (10)	118.550
12	Lili Mizuno	United States	29.950	30.400	29.400	28.100	117.850
13	Zohra Aghamirova	Azerbaijan	30.500	29.500	29.550	26.900	116.450
14	Marina Malpica	Mexico	29.250	28.900	29.450	28.500 (9)	116.100
15	Margarita Kolosov	Germany	28.900	29.250	30.550 (9)	26.950	115.650
16	Yating Zhao	China	29.450	28.900	28.750	28.200	115.300
17	Alba Bautista	Spain	28.100	30.400	29.750	26.550	114.800
18	Annaliese Dragan	Romania	28.600	30.550 (10)	27.600	26.750	113.500

=== Hoop ===
Rank	Gymnast	Nation	D Score	E Score	A Score	Pen.	Total
1st place, gold medalist(s)	Sofia Raffaeli	Italy	17.500	8.750	8.600		34.850
2nd place, silver medalist(s)	Stiliana Nikolova	Bulgaria	16.200	8.700	8.500		33.400
3rd place, bronze medalist(s)	Darja Varfolomeev	Germany	15.500	8.500	8.150		32.150
4	Adi Asya Katz	Israel	15.400	8.300	8.050		31.750
5	Margarita Kolosov	Germany	15.100	8.550	8.000		31.650
6	Zohra Aghamirova	Azerbaijan	15.300	8.000	7.850		31.150
7	Evita Griskenas	United States	14.000	8.200	8.250		30.450
8	Milena Baldassarri	Italy	14.100	7.550	7.950	-0.30	29.300

=== Ball ===
Rank	Gymnast	Nation	D Score	E Score	A Score	Pen.	Total
1st place, gold medalist(s)	Sofia Raffaeli	Italy	17.600	8.650	8.650		34.900
2nd place, silver medalist(s)	Darja Varfolomeev	Germany	17.100	8.700	8.300		34.100
3rd place, bronze medalist(s)	Milena Baldassarri	Italy	15.600	8.400	8.400		32.400
4	Viktoriia Onopriienko	Ukraine	14.300	8.250	8.250		30.800
5	Alba Bautista	Spain	14.600	7.900	8.150		30.650
6	Ekaterina Vedeneeva	Slovenia	14.000	8.550	7.900	-0.05	30.400
7	Adi Asya Katz	Israel	13.600	7.950	8.050		29.600
8	Andreea Verdes	Romania	13.400	7.800	8.000		29.200

=== Clubs ===
Rank	Gymnast	Nation	D Score	E Score	A Score	Pen.	Total
1st place, gold medalist(s)	Darja Varfolomeev	Germany	16.800	8.350	8.400		33.550
2nd place, silver medalist(s)	Stiliana Nikolova	Bulgaria	16.400	7.950	8.250		32.600
3rd place, bronze medalist(s)	Sofia Raffaeli	Italy	16.300	7.350	8.200		31.850
4	Takhmina Ikromova	Uzbekistan	15.400	8.250	7.900		31.550
5	Margarita Kolosov	Germany	15.000	8.250	8.100		31.350
6	Viktoriia Onopriienko	Ukraine	15.300	7.450	8.100		30.850
7	Annaliese Dragan	Romania	14.100	8.150	8.000		30.250
8	Ekaterina Vedeneeva	Slovenia	13.200	8.150	8.150	-0.05	29.450

=== Ribbon ===
Rank	Gymnast	Nation	D Score	E Score	A Score	Pen.	Total
1st place, gold medalist(s)	Sofia Raffaeli	Italy	15.600	8.350	8.700		32.650
2nd place, silver medalist(s)	Stiliana Nikolova	Bulgaria	14.700	8.500	8.650		31.850
3rd place, bronze medalist(s)	Ekaterina Vedeneeva	Slovenia	13.200	8.400	8.350	-0.05	29.900
4	Adi Asya Katz	Israel	13.400	8.300	8.200		29.900
5	Zohra Aghamirova	Azerbaijan	13.400	7.900	7.700		29.000
6	Annaliese Dragan	Romania	12.600	8.100	8.050		28.750
7	Alba Bautista	Spain	11.700	7.450	7.700	-0.05	26.800
8	Fanni Pigniczki	Hungary	11.000	7.000	7.250		25.250

== Groups ==
=== Squads ===
Team	Armenia (ARM)	Australia (AUS)	Azerbaijan (AZE)	Brazil (BRA)	Bulgaria (BUL)	Canada (CAN)
Members	Erika Davidyan; Maria Gevorgjans; Anahit Khachatryan; Hasmik Manukyan; Alina Pogosian	Ainsley Barker; Laura Gosling; Ashleigh Law; Tahlya Smith; Charlotte Wong	Gullu Aghalarzade; Laman Alimuradova; Kamilla Aliyeva; Zeynab Hummatova; Yelyzaveta Luzan; Darya Sorokina	Maria Arakaki; Deborah Medrado; Gabrielle Moraes; Giovanna Oliveira; Nicole Pircio; Barbara Urquiza	Sofia Ivanova; Kamelia Petrova; Rachel Stoyanov; Radina Tomova; Zhenina Trashlieva; Margarita Vasileva	Pari Goyal; Hanna Kalashnikava; Stephania Medetbayeva; Julia Oprea; Veronika Trublina
Team	China (CHN)	Chinese Taipei (TPE)	Czech Republic (CZE)	Estonia (EST)	Finland (FIN)	France (FRA)
Members	Guo Qiqi; Hao Ting; Huang Zhangjiayang; Pu Yanzhu; Wang Lanjing	Chan Ting-Chen; Lai Hsin-Ya; Lo Yu-Ching; Peng Fan-Xi; Tsai Jui-Shan	Kristina Charvátová; Isabela Hortová; Berenika Kouřilová; Táňa Krištofová; Adéla Podlahová	Adelina Beljajeva; Mirtel Korbelainen; Evelin Naptal; Kiara Oja; Arina Okamanchuk; Alina Vesselova	Thea Haiba; Assi Johansson; Vera Jokinen; Aurora Pohjanvirta; Erika Raesaenen; Vilina Sipilae	Eleonore Caburet; Emma Delaine; Ainhoa Dot; Manelle Inaho; Ashley Julien; Lozea Vilarino
Team	Georgia (GEO)	Germany (GER)	Greece (GRE)	Hungary (HUN)	Israel (ISR)	Italy (ITA)
Members	Gvantsa Bakuradze; Ana Bejiashvili; Mariam Kupunia; Elizabeth Anna Odikadze; Darya Ragimova; Mariam Tskhomaria	Anja Kosan; Daniella Kromm; Alina Oganesyan; Francine Schöning; Hannah Vester	Elpida Englezou; Kalomoira Karoki; Aikaterini Pagoulatou; Christina Ourania Riga; Marieta Topollai	Lilla Jurca; Alexa Amina Meszaros; Mandula Virag Meszaros; Dora Szabados; Monika Urban-Szabo; Lujza Varga	Shani Bakanov; Adar Friedmann; Romi Paritzki; Ofir Shaham; Diana Svertsov	Martina Centofanti; Agnese Duranti; Alessia Maurelli; Daniela Mogurean; Laura Paris; Martina Santandrea
Team	Japan (JPN)	Kazakhstan (KAZ)	Mexico (MEX)	Poland (POL)	Portugal (POR)	South Korea (KOR)
Members	Mirika Hayashi; Fuka Ikuno; Rinako Inaki; Chihana Nakamura; Ayuka Suzuki; Nanami Takenaka	Aruzhan Kassenova; Sagina Muratkyzy; Aidana Shakenova; Assel Shukirbay; Renata Zholdinova	Dalia Alcocer; Nicole Cejudo; Sofia Flores; Kimberly Salazar; Adirem Tejeda	Milena Gorska; Liwia Krzyzanowska; Madoka Przybylska; Magdalena Szewczuk; Julia Wojciechowska	Margarida Ferreira; Beatriz Freitas; Clara Melo; Felicia Oprea; Clara Paiva; Bruna Simoes	Jun Yeo-jin; Ko Ye-jin; Lee So-yun; Park Dog-yeong; Ye Eun-mi
Team	Spain (ESP)	Turkey (TUR)	Ukraine (UKR)	United States (USA)	Uzbekistan (UZB)	Venezuela (VEN)
Members	Ana Arnau; Inés Bergua; Valeria Márquez; Mireia Martínez; Patricia Pérez; Salma Solaun	Işıl Alaş; Yeliz Gunes; Nehir Serap Özdemir; Melisa Sert; Duru Duygu Usta	Yelyzaveta Azza; Diana Baieva; Daryna Duda; Nikol Krasiuk; Anastasiya Voznyak; Oleksandra Yushchak	Gergana Petkova; Katrine Sakhnov; Karolina Saverino; Hana Starkman; Emily Wilson	Khurshidabonu Abduraufova; Nilufar Azamova; Nargiza Djumaniyazova; Shakhzoda Ibragimova; Mumtozabonu Iskhokzoda; Mariya Pak	Maria Dominguez; Maria Waleska Odeja; Rocelyn Palencia; Dahilin Parra; Juliette Quiroz; Yelbery Rodriguez

=== All-Around ===
The top 8 scores in the apparatus qualifies to the group apparatus finals.

Place	Nation	5	3 + 2	Total
1st place, gold medalist(s)	Bulgaria	33.800 (3)	32.800 (1)	66.600
2nd place, silver medalist(s)	Israel	33.850 (2)	30.800 (2)	64.650
3rd place, bronze medalist(s)	Spain	33.450 (6)	29.750 (3)	63.200
4	Italy	34.150 (1)	27.900 (8)	62.050
5	Brazil	33.550 (5)	27.150 (10)	60.700
6	Mexico	32.150 (7)	28.000 (7)	60.150
7	China	31.900 (8)	28.100 (5)	60.000
8	Japan	33.750 (4)	26.050 (13)	59.800
9	Azerbaijan	30.000 (14)	29.250 (4)	59.250
10	Greece	30.950 (11)	27.850 (9)	58.800
11	France	31.400 (9)	26.550 (12)	57.950
12	Ukraine	30.800 (12)	27.100 (11)	57.900
13	Poland	30.950 (10)	25.850 (14)	56.800
14	Germany	25.950 (21)	28.050 (6)	54.000
15	United States	28.650 (15)	25.250 (16)	53.900
16	Hungary	28.500 (16)	25.350 (15)	53.850
17	Finland	27.600 (19)	25.100 (17)	52.700
18	Uzbekistan	30.000 (13)	22.250 (20)	52.250
19	Georgia	28.150 (18)	21.600 (22)	49.750
20	Estonia	29.250 (15)	24.500 (18)	53.750
21	Turkey	28.200 (17)	17.750 (27)	45.950
22	Australia	24.750 (24)	20.500 (23)	45.250
23	Czech Republic	25.600 (22)	19.600 (25)	45.200
24	Kazakhstan	23.250 (26)	21.850 (21)	45.100
25	Portugal	20.750 (28)	24.300 (19)	45.050
26	South Korea	25.600 (23)	19.400 (26)	45.000
27	Venezuela	23.450 (25)	20.350 (24)	43.800
28	Chinese Taipei	26.400 (20)	17.400 (28)	43.800
29	Armenia	16.200 (29)	8.200 (29)	24.400
DNS	Canada			DNS

=== 5 Hoops ===
Rank	Nation	D Score	E Score	A Score	Pen.	Total
1st place, gold medalist(s)	Italy	17.800	8.450	8.700		34.950
2nd place, silver medalist(s)	Israel	17.500	8.400	8.150		34.050
3rd place, bronze medalist(s)	Spain	17.100	8.300	8.400		33.800
4	Brazil	17.600	7.650	8.100		33.350
5	Japan	17.100	7.500	8.250		32.850
6	Mexico	16.700	7.750	7.750		32.200
7	China	16.000	7.350	8.300		31.650
8	Bulgaria	15.500	7.550	8.350		31.400

=== 3 Ribbons + 2 Balls ===
Rank	Nation	D Score	E Score	A Score	Pen.	Total
1st place, gold medalist(s)	Bulgaria	16.500	8.200	8.600		33.300
2nd place, silver medalist(s)	Italy	15.100	7.800	8.550		31.450
3rd place, bronze medalist(s)	Azerbaijan	15.600	7.450	7.700		30.750
4	China	14.700	7.050	7.600		29.350
5	Spain	14.800	6.500	7.450	-0.30	28.450
6	Germany	14.100	7.050	7.450	-0.65	27.950
7	Israel	13.500	6.500	7.450	-0.30	27.150
8	Mexico	13.700	6.050	7.050	-0.30	26.500

== Team ==
=== Combined Team Ranking ===
Place	Nation	Hoop (rhythmic gymnastics)	Ball (rhythmic gymnastics)	Clubs (rhythmic gymnastics)	Ribbon (rhythmic gymnastics)	5	3 + 2	Total
1st place, gold medalist(s)	Italy	63.650	66.000	60.350	60.500	34.150	27.900	312.550
2nd place, silver medalist(s)	Germany	64.750	62.750	61.900	58.000	25.950	28.050	301.400
3rd place, bronze medalist(s)	Spain	55.300	60.050	59.300	59.250	33.450	29.750	297.100
4	Ukraine	58.200	61.350	57.950	57.000	30.800	27.100	292.400
5	United States	60.000	60.000	57.400	55.750	25.250	28.650	287.050
6	Azerbaijan	57.850	54.950	57.450	57.000	30.000	29.250	286.500
7	Uzbekistan	59.100	58.550	57.900	58.400	30.000	22.250	286.200
8	France	59.050	57.600	54.200	55.150	31.400	26.550	283.950
9	Hungary	56.700	57.700	58.250	57.400	28.500	25.350	283.900
10	Brazil	52.350	55.200	54.850	56.500	33.550	27.150	279.600
11	Japan	54.800	54.250	54.050	55.450	33.750	26.050	278.340
12	China	57.100	58.850	56.150	45.300	31.900	28.100	277.400
13	Kazakhstan	59.600	57.850	57.850	55.650	23.250	21.850	276.050
14	Greece	52.000	55.550	55.350	52.150	30.950	27.850	273.850
15	South Korea	53.500	54.200	48.700	50.300	25.600	19.400	251.700
16	Australia	53.000	52.250	51.200	47.300	24.750	20.500	249.000

== Olympic quotas ==
The top three groups in the group all-around earned group quotas for the 2024 Olympic Games.

Nation	Women's		Quotas	Athletes
Nation	Individual	Group	Quotas	Athletes
Bulgaria	1	1	2	6
Israel	0	1	1	5
Spain	0	1	1	5
Germany	1	0	1	1
Italy	1	0	1	1
Total: 5 countries	3	3	6	18

== Medal table ==
* Host nation (Bulgaria)

Rank	Nation	Gold	Silver	Bronze	Total
1	Italy	6	1	2	9
2	Bulgaria*	2	3	1	6
3	Germany	1	3	1	5
4	Israel	0	2	0	2
5	Spain	0	0	3	3
6	Azerbaijan	0	0	1	1
6	Slovenia	0	0	1	1
Totals (7 entries)		9	9	9	27
