= Işıl Alaş =

Turkish rhythmic gymnast

- Born: 19 February 2006 (age 20) Antalya, Turkey

Gymnastics career
- Discipline: Rhythmic gymnastics
- Country represented: Turkey (2020-present)
- Club: Ozel Antalya Koleji
- Head coach: Natalia Safonova
- Assistant coach: Elena Kholodova
Medal record
Rhythmic gymnastics
Representing Turkey
Event	1st	2nd	3rd
Islamic Solidarity Games	0	0	1
Total	0	0	1
Islamic Solidarity Games
Bronze medal – third place	2021 Konya	3 Ribbons + 2 Balls

Işıl Alaş (born 19 February 2006) is a Turkish rhythmic gymnast, member of the national group.

== Career ==
In 2020 Işıl debuted at the 2020 European Championships in Kyiv as a junior gymnast, competing with ball and clubs and finishing 17th and 24th.

After becoming a senior in 2022 Işıl entered the national group and competed at the 2021 Islamic Solidarity Games in Konya where the group won bronze with 3 ribbons and 2 balls. In September Alaş took part in the World Championships in Sofia along Yeliz Gunes, Nehir Serap Özdemir, Melisa Sert, Duru Duygu Usta, and the individual Kamelya Tuncel, taking 21st place in the All-Around, 17th with 5 hoops and 27th with 3 ribbons + 2 balls.
