= Yeliz Güneş =

Turkish rhythmic gymnast

Yeliz Gunes
- Born: 28 February 2006 (age 20) Almaty, Kazakhstan

Gymnastics career
- Discipline: Rhythmic gymnastics
- Country represented: Turkey; (2019-present)
- Head coach: Natalia Safonova
- Assistant coach: Elena Kholodova
Medal record
Rhythmic gymnastics
Representing Turkey
Event	1st	2nd	3rd
Islamic Solidarity Games	0	0	1
Total	0	0	1
Islamic Solidarity Games
Bronze medal – third place	2021 Konya	3 Ribbons + 2 Balls

Yeliz Gunes (born 28 February 2006) is a Turkish rhythmic gymnast competing as a member of the national group.

== Career ==
Yeliz debuted at the 1st Junior World Championships in Moscow, where she competed with a ball and finished 26th.

After becoming a senior in 2022, Gunes entered the national team and competed at the 2021 Islamic Solidarity Games in Konya, where the group won bronze with 3 ribbons and 2 balls. In September Yeliz took part in the World Championships in Sofia along with Işıl Alaş, Nehir Serap Ozdemir, Melisa Sert, Duru Duygu Usta, and the individual Kamelya Tuncel. The team took 21st place in the all-around, 17th with 5 hoops and 27th with 3 ribbons + 2 balls.
