= Margarita Kolosov =

German rhythmic gymnast (born 2004)

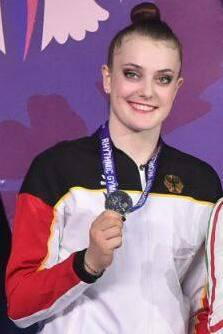
- Kolosov in 2023

Personal information
- Full name: Margarita Kolosov
- Nickname: Marga
- Born: 11 March 2004 (age 22) Potsdam, Germany
- Height: 170 cm (5 ft 7 in)

Gymnastics career
- Discipline: Rhythmic gymnastics
- Country represented: Germany; (2017–present)
- Club: SC Potsdam/TSV Schmiden/Berlin TSC
- Gym: Bundesstützpunkt Schmiden
- Head coach: Yulia Raskina
- Choreographer: Gocha Budagashvili
- World ranking: 9 (2024 Season); 7 (2023 Season); 6 (2022 Season)
Medal record
Event	1st	2nd	3rd
World Championships	0	2	0
Summer Universiade	1	0	0
FIG World Cup	3	3	7
Total	4	5	7
Rhythmic Gymnastics
Representing Germany
World Championships
Silver medal – second place	2022 Sofia	Team
Silver medal – second place	2023 Valencia	Team
Summer Universiade
Gold medal – first place	2025 Rhine-Rhur	Ball
- Last updated on: 10 August 2025.

Margarita Kolosov (born 11 March 2004) is a German rhythmic gymnast. She is a two-time (2021, 2024) German all-around champion. She is also a two-time (2022, 2023) World team silver medalist. Kolosov competed at the 2024 Paris Olympics in the individual all-around, where she came in fourth place.

Kolosov has been training at the federal base in Fellbach with Yuliya Raskina since 2016.

== Personal life ==
She has two sisters, Alissa and Victoria. In 2020, Kolosov, together with numerous athletes, appeared in the music video by Tim Bendzko for the song "HOCH" (OLYMPIA TEAM D VERSION). She studies psychology at AKAD University in Stuttgart.

== Career ==
Together with her sister, Kolosov started training rhythmic gymnastics at SC Potsdam in 2010 at the age of 6. Her main ambition was to compete at the Olympics, like her idol Margarita Mamun, at the 2024 Paris Olympics.

=== Junior ===
In August 2016, Kolosov moved from SC Potsdam to the federal training base in Fellbach. From 2017 to 2019, she was German Junior Champion in the all-around. While she won only one final in 2017, she won all four gold medals in the following two years.

In 2018, she and Emeli Erbes competed at the 2018 European Championships in Guadalajara, Spain. Since the German senior group retired shortly before the competition, they could not participate in the team category, which required a senior group. Kolosov was 14th in the all-around among the juniors.

=== Senior ===
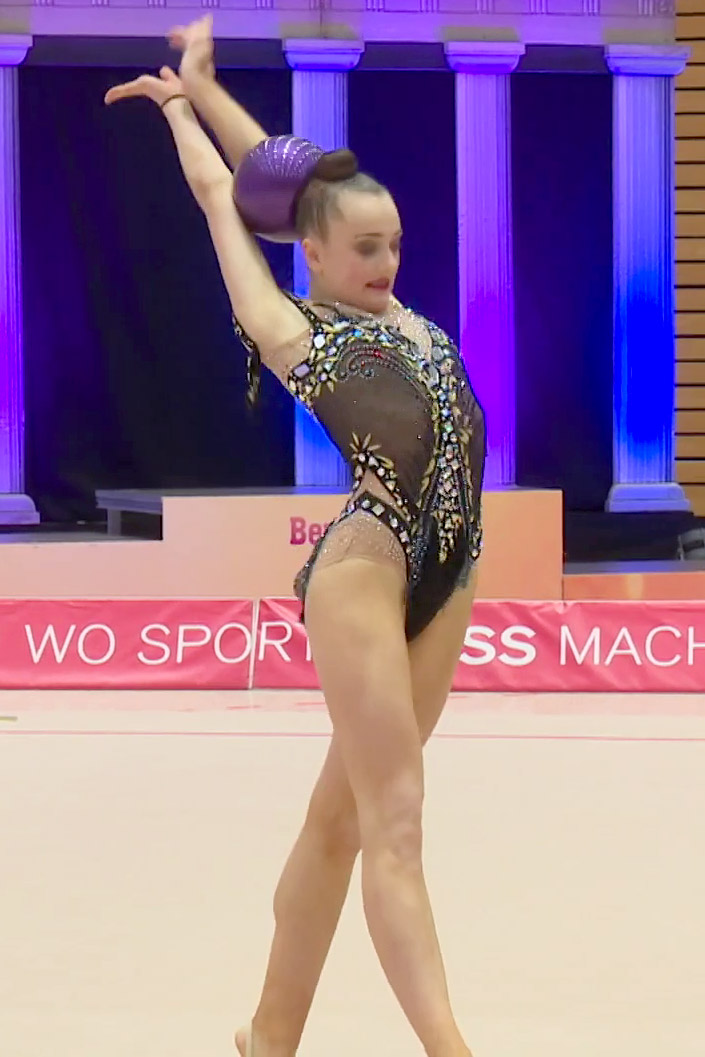
Kolosov performing with the ball in early 2020

In 2020, due to the COVID-19 pandemic, Kolosov was only able to take part in a few competitions in her first senior season. In 2021 she competed for the first time at the German Rhythmic Gymnastics Championships in the senior category and won all the gold medals in the individual competitions. At her first European Senior Championships in Varna, she qualified for the all-round final, finishing 24th. She also reached the all-around final at the World Championships in Kitakyūshū and finished 16th, the best result of a German individual gymnast since 2013. At the end of the year, she and the team of the Berlin TSC finished second in the rhythmic gymnastics bundesliga.

==== 2022 ====
She started the 2022 season competing at World Cup Athens, where she won bronze with ball and silver with ribbon. At the World Cup in Sofia, she finished 11th in the all-around and 8th in the ball final. In Tashkent, she was 4th in the all-around behind her teammate Darja Varfolomeev as well as in the hoop final. She won Germany's first World Cup gold medal in the ball final. She also earned silver with clubs and was 5th in the ribbon final. In Pamplona, she ended 9th in the all-around, qualifying only for the ball final, where she ended in 8th, and hoop, where she won gold. In June she competed alongside Helena Ripken in Pesaro, where she was 7th in the all-around and 4th in the ball final.

Kolosov then competed at the European Championships in Tel Aviv, along with Varfolomeev, the senior group and the two juniors Lada Pusch and Anna-Maria Shatokhin; she was 15th in the all-around, 7th with hoop, 5th with ball, and 29th with ribbon. At the World Cup in Cluj-Napoca, she was 18th in the all-around and didn't qualify for finals. Kolosov was also selected for the World Championships in Sofia along with Varfolomeev and the senior group, where she won silver in the team event.

==== 2023 ====
In 2023 she showed her clubs routine in the Italian clubs championship's first stage, where she competed for Pontevecchio Bologna. In March she won silver in the all-around at the Fellnach-Schmiden Tournament and qualified for all four apparatus finals. In the finals, she also won silver with ribbon and ball. At the first World Cup of the season in Athens, she made some mistakes and qualified only for the ribbon and clubs finals. She finished 8th in the ribbon final and won gold with the clubs.

At the 2023 World Championships, she was 12th in the all-around final and qualified for the hoop and ball finals, and she and the rest of the German team won silver in the team segment. Her all-around placement qualified Germany a second quota for the 2024 Summer Olympics.

==== 2024 ====
Kolosov competed at the 2024 European Championships in Budapest. She came in 7th in the all-around final and qualified for the clubs final; however, in the clubs final, she dropped her apparatus twice and finished in 8th place. At the 2024 German national championships, Kolosov became the all-around champion ahead of Varfolomeev, a result that was considered surprising as Varfolomeev was the 2023 World champion in every individual category. The next day, during the apparatus finals, she won gold in the ball final and silver medals in hoop, cubs and ribbon.

At the World Cup in Milan, Kolosov came in fifth overall after a loss of apparatus in her clubs routine. She competed in three of the four apparatus finals and came in fourth with clubs, fifth with ribbon, and eighth with ball.

In August, she competed at the 2024 Summer Olympics. She qualified for the final, where she came in fourth place after improving on her qualification scores. She ended narrowly behind Sofia Raffaeli, who won the bronze. Fellow German Darja Varfolomeev, the gold medalist, comforted her afterward.

==== 2025 ====
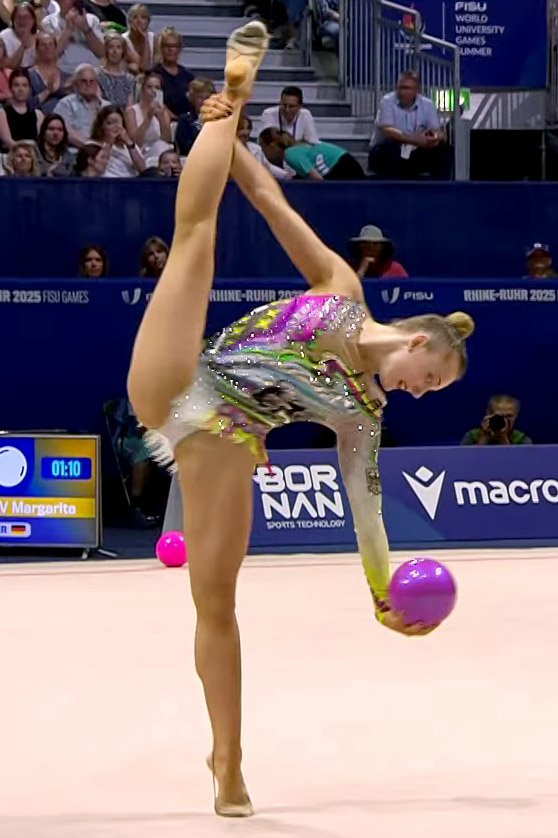
Kolosov performing a rotation in a side split position at the 2025 Summer World University Games

The next year, she competed at the Gdynia Rhythmic Stars in Poland, taking 9th place in all-around and silver medal in ribbon final. In May, she and Varfolomeev were awarded the German Gymnastics Federation's Flatow Medal, which honors the memories of Alfred Flatow and Gustav Flatow, at the Turnfest Festival in Leipzig, Germany.

Kolosov was selected to compete at the 2025 Summer World University Games along with her teammate Anastasia Simakova. This was the first time that Germany had sent a team of rhythmic gymnasts to the event. She took 15th place in the all-around due to many mistakes in her routines and was therefore not satisfied with the result. However, the next day, she won a historic gold medal in the ball final.

In August, she took fourth place behind Viktoria Steinfeld at the 2025 German National Championships. In the apparatus finals, she won silver with hoop and bronze with ribbon. She was initially selected to represent Germany at the 2025 World Championships in Rio de Janeiro, but she was later replaced by Anastasia Simakova.

==== 2026 ====
Kolosov competed at the World Cup in Baku, where she placed 44th. She attributed her performance to not having competed internationally for some time. She intended to again compete at the Gydnia Rhythmic Stars in early May; however, she withdrew after injuring her ankle, which required she rest it for at least a week. In July, she took 4th place in the all-around at the German National championships. She also took 4th place in all the apparatus finals but ball, where she won the silver medal.

== Achievements ==
- First German rhythmic gymnast to win a gold medal in an individual apparatus final at the FIG World Cup series.
- First German rhythmic gymnast to win a gold medal in an individual apparatus final at the FISU World University Games.

== Routine music information ==
Year	Apparatus	Music Title
2026	Hoop	If I Can Dream by Elvis Presley
2026	Ball	Boogie Wonderland by Earth, Wind & Fire
2026	Clubs	For the Departed by Shayfer James
2026	Ribbon	Smells Like Teen Spirit by Nirvana
2025	Hoop	If I Can Dream by Elvis Presley
2025	Ball	Yes Sir, I Can Boogie by The Fratellis
2025	Clubs	For the Departed by Shayfer James
2025	Ribbon	Unter den Wolken by Die Toten Hosen
2024	Hoop	Zitti e buoni by Måneskin
2024	Ball	Feeling Good by Muse
2024	Clubs	Party Rock Anthem by LMFAO
2024	Ribbon	Dream On by Aerosmith
2023	Hoop	Guerrilleros by Maxime Rodriguez
2023	Ball	Feeling Good by Muse
2023	Clubs	Party Rock Anthem by LMFAO
2023	Ribbon	I Wanna Be Your Slave by Måneskin
2022	Hoop (first)	Battle of the Kings by Audiomachine
2022	Hoop (second)	Guerrilleros by Maxime Rodriguez
2022	Ball	Ninja by Maxime Rodriguez
2022	Clubs	Pump It by Black Eyed Peas
2022	Ribbon	I Wanna Be Your Slave by Måneskin
2021	Hoop	Shame On Me by Avicii
2021	Ball	Ninja by Maxime Rodriguez
2021	Clubs	Swing Break by The McMash Clan feat. Kate Mullins
2021	Ribbon	Romani Holiday (Antonius Remix) by Hans Zimmer
2020	Hoop	Shame On Me by Avicii
2020	Ball	Ninja by Maxime Rodriguez
2020	Clubs	Swing Break by The McMash Clan feat. Kate Mullins
2020	Ribbon	Romani Holiday (Antonius Remix) by Hans Zimmer

== Competitive highlights ==
(Team competitions in seniors are held only at the World Championships, Europeans and other Continental Games.)

International: Senior
Year	Event	AA	Team	Hoop	Ball	Clubs	Ribbon
2026	World Cup Baku	44th		53th (Q)	33rd (Q)	49th (Q)	37th (Q)
2025	World Cup Challenge Cluj-Napoca	11th		16th (Q)	11th (Q)	9th (Q)	12th (Q)
2025	Summer Universiade	15th		32th (Q)	1st	24th (Q)	10th (Q)
2025	IT Gdynia Rhythmic Stars	9th		5th		6th	2nd
2025	Gymnastik International Fellbach-Schmiden			3rd			
2024	Olympic Games	4th					
2024	World Challenge Cup Cluj-Napoca	16th		3rd	21st (Q)	13th (Q)	22nd (Q)
2024	World Cup Milan	5th		12th (Q)	8th	4th	5th
2024	European Championships	7th	4th	10th (Q)	9th (Q)	8th	
2024	World Cup Tashkent	9th		25th (Q)	3rd	10th (Q)	7th
2024	World Cup Baku	5th		8th (Q)	7th	5th	9th (Q)
2024	World Cup Athens	14th		28th (Q)	9th (Q)	14th (Q)	9th (Q)
2024	Gymnastik International Fellbach-Schmiden					2nd	1st
2023	Aeon Cup	4th	1st				
2023	World Championships	12th	2nd	5th	19th (Q)	8th	14th (Q)
2023	World Challenge Cup Cluj-Napoca	8th		3rd	29th (Q)	11th (Q)	8th
2023	European Championships	9th	5th	11th (Q)	15th (Q)	14th (Q)	16th (Q)
2023	World Challenge Cup Portimão	5th		8th	9th (Q)	10th (Q)	7th
2023	World Cup Tashkent	3rd		2nd	2nd	8th	3rd
2023	World Cup Athens	6th		9th (Q)	10th (Q)	1st	8th
2023	Gymnastik International Fellbach-Schmiden	2nd		3rd	2nd	4th	2nd
2022	World Championships	15th	2nd	5th	12th (Q)	5th	14th (Q)
2022	World Challenge Cup Cluj-Napoca	18th		21st (Q)	20th (Q)	9th (Q)	20th (Q)
2022	European Championships	15th	5th	7th	5th		29th (Q)
2022	World Cup Pesaro	7th		11th (Q)	4th	11th (Q)	13th (Q)
2022	World Challenge Cup Pamplona	9th		1st	8th	23rd (Q)	14th (Q)
2022	World Cup Tashkent	4th		4th	1st	3rd	5th
2022	World Cup Sofia	11th		15th (Q)	9th (Q)	16th (Q)	7th
2022	World Cup Athens	4th		5th	3rd	8th	2nd
2021	World Championships	16th		19th (Q)	12th (Q)	15th (Q)	18th (Q)
2021	World Challenge Cup Cluj-Napoca	10th		14th (Q)	9th (Q)	14th (Q)	8th
2021	European Championships	24th	13th	23rd (Q)	21st (Q)	22nd (Q)	34th (Q)
2021	World Cup Pesaro	25th		34th (Q)	23rd (Q)	20th (Q)	27th (Q)
2021	World Cup Baku	48th		60th (Q)	28th (Q)	32nd (Q)	36th (Q)
2021	World Cup Sofia	25th		28th (Q)	27th (Q)	26th (Q)	26th (Q)
International: Junior
Year	Event	AA	Team	Rope	Ball	Clubs	Ribbon
2019	Junior World Championships		15th	31st (Q)	18th (Q)		17th (Q)
Year	Event	AA	Team	Hoop	Ball	Clubs	Ribbon
2018	Junior European Championships	14th		42 (Q)	30 (Q)	40 (Q)	24 (Q)
National: Senior
Year	Event	AA	Team	Hoop	Ball	Clubs	Ribbon
2026	German Championships	4th		4th	2nd	4th	4th
2025	German Championships	4th		2nd	4th	4th	3rd
2024	German Championships	1st		2nd	1st	2nd	2nd
2023	German Championships	2nd		4th	2nd	2nd	2nd
2022	German Championships	2nd		2nd	2nd	2nd	1st
2021	German Championships	1st		1st	1st	1st	1st
National: Junior
Year	Event	AA	Team	Rope	Ball	Clubs	Ribbon
2019	German Junior Championships	1st		1st	1st	1st	1st
Year	Event	AA	Team	Hoop	Ball	Clubs	Ribbon
2018	German Junior Championships	1st		1st	1st	1st	1st
Q = Qualifications (Did not advance to Event Final due to the 2 gymnast per country rule, only Top 8 highest score); WD = Withdrew
