= Darja Varfolomeev =

German rhythmic gymnast (born 2006)

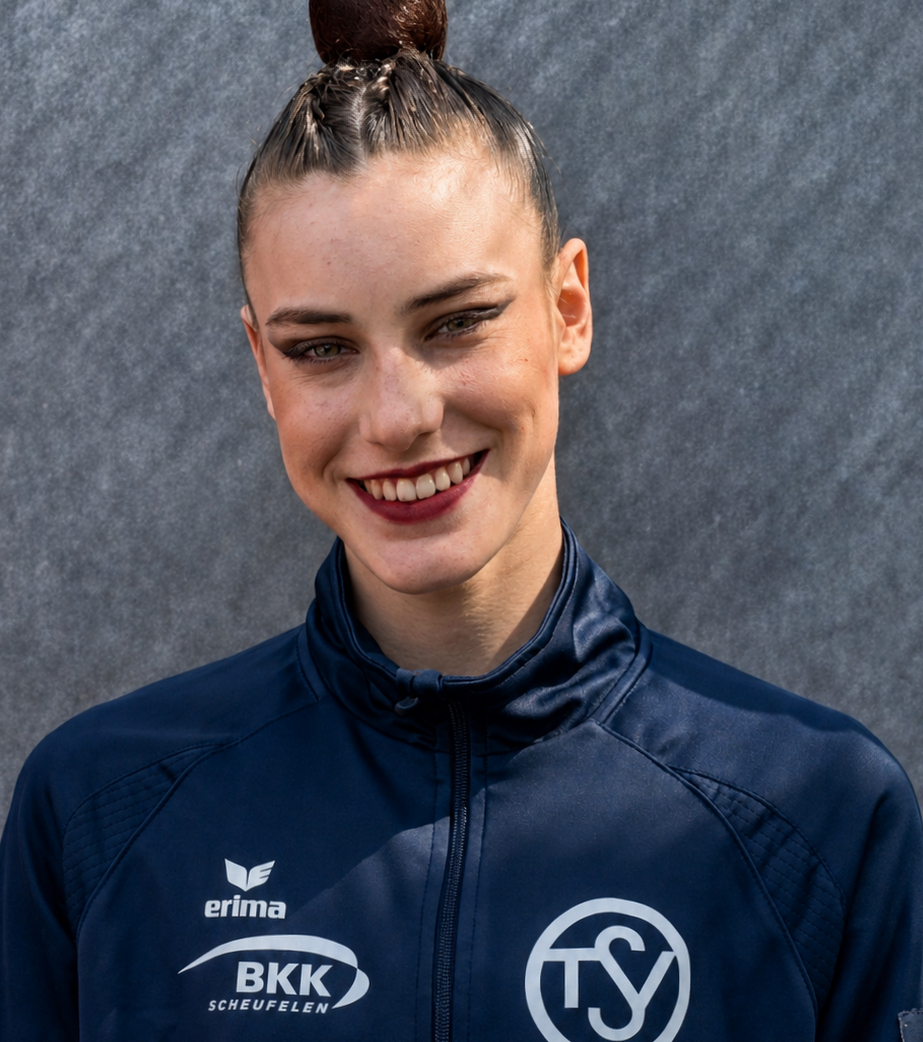
- Varfolomeev in 2025

Personal information
- Full name: Darja Dmitrievna Varfolomeeva
- Nickname: Dasha
- Born: 4 November 2006 (age 20) Barnaul, Russia
- Height: 175 cm (5 ft 9 in)

Gymnastics career
- Discipline: Rhythmic gymnastics
- Country represented: Germany; (2019 - present)
- Club: TSV Schmiden
- Gym: Bundesstützpunkt Schmiden
- Head coach: Yulia Raskina
- World ranking: 1 (2026 Season ) 2 (2025 Season ) 1 (2024 Season ) 4 (2023 Season); 14 (2022 Season)
Medal record
Rhythmic Gymnastics
Representing Germany
Event	1st	2nd	3rd
Olympic Games	1	0	0
World Championships	14	4	2
European Championships	6	0	4
FIG World Cup	28	11	7
FIG World Challenge Cup	19	6	3
Total	68	21	16
Olympic Games
Gold medal – first place	2024 Paris	All-Around
World Championships
Gold medal – first place	2022 Sofia	Clubs
Gold medal – first place	2023 Valencia	All-Around
Gold medal – first place	2023 Valencia	Hoop
Gold medal – first place	2023 Valencia	Ball
Gold medal – first place	2023 Valencia	Clubs
Gold medal – first place	2023 Valencia	Ribbon
Gold medal – first place	2025 Rio de Janeiro	All-Around
Gold medal – first place	2025 Rio de Janeiro	Team
Gold medal – first place	2025 Rio de Janeiro	Ball
Gold medal – first place	2025 Rio de Janeiro	Clubs
Gold medal – first place	2025 Rio de Janeiro	Ribbon
Gold medal – first place	2026 Frankfurt	All-Around
Gold medal – first place	2026 Frankfurt	Ball
Gold medal – first place	2026 Frankfurt	Ribbon
Silver medal – second place	2022 Sofia	All-Around
Silver medal – second place	2022 Sofia	Ball
Silver medal – second place	2022 Sofia	Team
Silver medal – second place	2023 Valencia	Team
Bronze medal – third place	2022 Sofia	Hoop
Bronze medal – third place	2026 Frankfurt	Hoop
European Championships
Gold medal – first place	2023 Baku	Ribbon
Gold medal – first place	2024 Budapest	Ribbon
Gold medal – first place	2025 Tallinn	Ribbon
Gold medal – first place	2026 Varna	All-Around
Gold medal – first place	2026 Varna	Ball
Gold medal – first place	2026 Varna	Ribbon
Bronze medal – third place	2022 Tel Aviv	Ball
Bronze medal – third place	2022 Tel Aviv	Clubs
Bronze medal – third place	2024 Budapest	All-Around
Bronze medal – third place	2025 Tallinn	All-Around

Darja Varfolomeev (Russian: Да́рья Дми́триевна Варфоломе́ева; born 4 November 2006) is a Russian-born German rhythmic gymnast. She is the 2024 Olympic all-around champion, a three-time consecutive (2023, 2025 and 2026) World all-around champion and the 2026 European all-around champion. She is also the 2022 World all-around silver medalist and a two-time (2024, 2025) European all-around bronze medalist.

At the national level, she is a four-time (2022, 2023, 2025, 2026) German all-around champion and a two-time all-around junior champion (in 2019 and 2021).

== Personal life ==
Varfolomeev was born in Barnaul, Russia, to father Dmitry and mother Tatiana. Her grandfather is an ethnic German who lives in Aschaffenburg, through whom she has German citizenship. She started rhythmic gymnastics at a young age after being brought to the gym by her mother, a former rhythmic gymnast. Her father is a chef.

Varfolomeev attended a training camp in Germany in 2018. She was asked to stay, and though her parents were uncertain, Varfolomeev said that she wanted to do so, which she later said "was the most difficult decision of my life, but also the greatest decision I made at the time". She moved to Germany in 2019 without her parents to be coached by Olympic silver medalist Yulia Raskina. Varfolomeev initially lived in a boarding school and was visited by her grandparents when they were able to do so. Her parents moved to Germany as well three years later.

She owns a chihuahua. Due to her training load ahead of the 2024 Summer Olympics, she reduced her schoolwork and delayed her graduation from secondary school.

She was criticized in Ukrainian media in 2024 for photos on her Instagram, some of which showed her competing in Russian-occupied Crimea in 2021, when she was 14, and one which showed a wooden map of the world apparently bought in Russia and depicting Ukrainian territories annexed in 2022 by Russia. The photos were removed a day later.

== Career ==
=== Junior ===
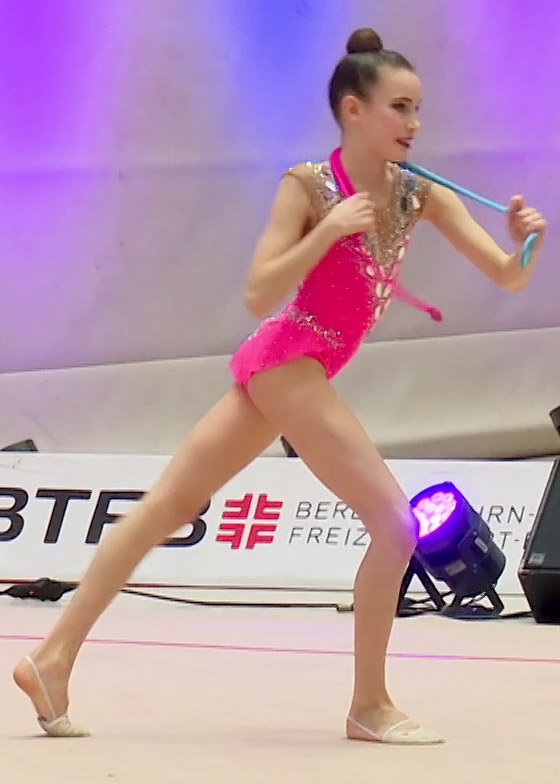
Varfolomeev performing with the rope in early 2020

At the first Junior World Championships in rhythmic gymnastics in Moscow in 2019, she placed 15th in the team event with Margarita Kolosov. She also placed 15th in qualifications for the clubs, which was the only apparatus she competed with.

=== Senior ===
==== 2022 season: Senior debut and World silver all-around medal ====
She debuted in the senior category in 2022, at World Cup Tashkent, where she won the bronze medal in the all-around. She took another bronze medal in the hoop final and two silver medals in the ball and ribbon finals, and she placed 4th with clubs. On May 20–22, she competed at the World Challenge Cup in Pamplona, where she took 4th place in the all-around. She also won two gold medals in the ball and ribbon finals and was 4th place in the clubs final. Varfolomeev continued collecting medals at World Challenge Cup Portimão, where she won silver in the all-around behind Israeli Adi Asya Katz. She took three more medals in the apparatus finals - two gold with ball and clubs and one silver with hoop.

In June she competed at the European Championships in Tel Aviv, along with Margarita Kolosov, the senior group, and the two juniors Lada Pusch and Anna-Maria Shatokhin; she won two bronze medals in the ball and clubs finals. In late August she took part in the World Cup in Cluj-Napoca, where she was 6th in the all-around, 4th with ball and 4th with clubs.

Varfolomeev was also selected for the World Championships in Sofia along with Kolosov and the senior group. There she won gold in the clubs final, silver in the all-around, team category, and ball, as well as bronze with hoop.

==== 2023 season: World all-around gold sweep ====
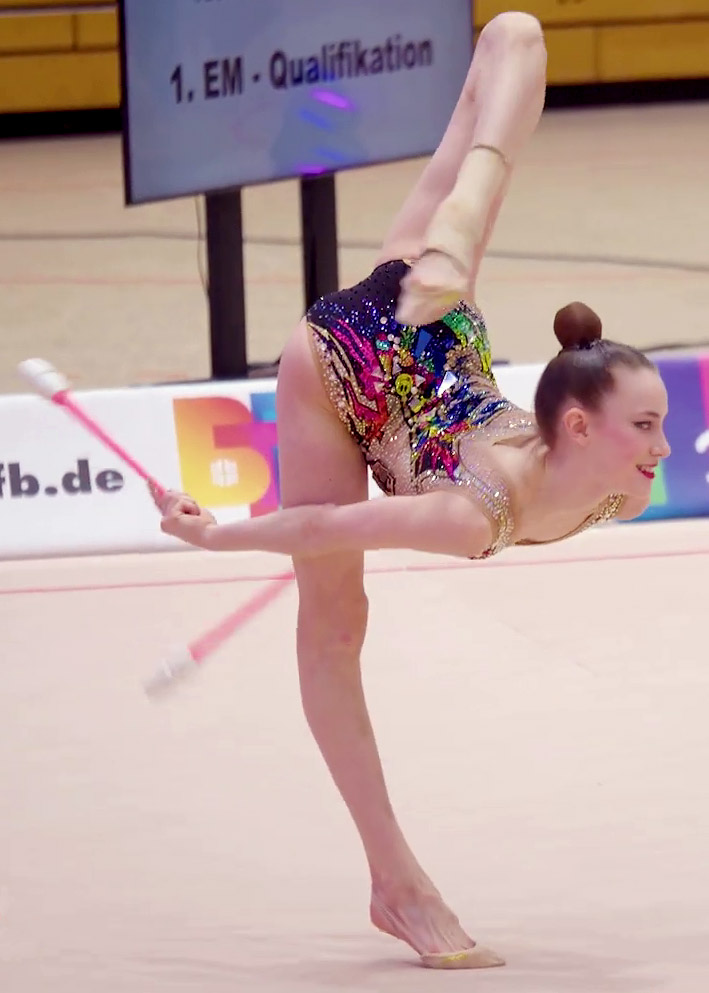
Varfolomeev performing a balance with the clubs in 2023

In 2023 she showed her clubs routine in the Italian clubs championship' first stage, where she competed for Motto Viareggio. Due to a foot operation in December 2022, Varfolomeev competed with only two apparatuses in the Fellbach-Schmiden Tournament, where she won gold in both the ball and clubs finals. She won one medal at the 2023 European Championships, the gold in ribbon.

At the 2023 World Championships held in late August, Varfolomeev won every gold medal available in the all-around and the four apparatus finals, making her the first rhythmic gymnast to do so since Evgeniya Kanaeva in 2009 and fourth to ever do so after Bianka Panova, Oksana Kostina, and Kanaeva. It was the first world all-around title for a German rhythmic gymnast in nearly 50 years, after Carmen Rischer won the 1975 World Championships.

Shortly afterward, in September, she spoke to the sports committee in the Bundestag to advocate for increased funding for the sport, noting that her parents personally paid thousands of euros for her to participate on the World Cup series. At the time, out of the 103 Summer Olympic disciplines, rhythmic gymnastics was ranked 99th for potential for a German athlete to medal by the German Olympic Sports Confederation.

In October, she was a co-winner of the Piotr Nurowski Prize awarded by the European Olympic Committees to athletes under 18, along with Turkish swimmer Kuzey Tunçelli. During the off-season, she traveled to give master classes in Spain and Poland.

==== 2024 season: Olympic champion ====
In March, Varfolomeev competed at the Rhythmic Gymnastics Grand Prix stage in Marbella, where she won the all-around bronze medal and qualified for the hoop, clubs, and ribbon finals. In the hoop final, she won gold.

The next month, she competed at the World Cup in Baku. She won the all-around gold ahead of Elvira Krasnobaeva and Sofia Raffaeli, and she then went on to win three of the four event final golds as well in the hoop, ball, and ribbon finals. In the clubs final, she dropped her apparatus and came in third behind Raffaeli and Taisiia Onofriichuk. The week after, she competed at the next World Cup in Tashkent, where she once again won the all-around, this time ahead of Takhmina Ikromova and Boryana Kaleyn. In the apparatus finals, she won two more golds in clubs and ribbon, and silver in the other two finals, hoop and ball.

In May, she represented Germany at the 2024 European Championships in Budapest, Hungary. She won the bronze medal in the all-around final behind Stiliana Nikolova and Sofia Raffaeli. She also placed fourth in the team competition with fellow Germans Anastasia Simakova, Margarita Kolosov, and the German senior group. In the apparatus finals, Varfolomeev won a gold medal in ribbon and placed fourth in the ball final. She did not advance into the clubs final after finishing 10th in qualifications.

On June 6–7, she competed at the German National Championships and won the silver medal in the all-around behind Margarita Kolosov. She had a drop during her hoop routine when the hoop hit a bar on the ceiling and at the end of the all-around, she was 0.3 point away from her teammate. The next day, during the event finals, she adjusted her routines for the ceiling of the venue and rebounded to win three of the four gold medals (hoop, clubs, and ribbon). She also won silver in the ball final behind Kolosov. Later in June, she competed at the World Cup in Milan. She won the all-around ahead of Sofia Raffaeli and Viktoriia Onopriienko and won three medals in the apparatus finals: gold with ball and clubs and silver with ribbon. In the hoop final, she dropped her apparatus and ended in fourth.

In August, she competed at the 2024 Summer Olympics. After dropping her hoop, she qualified for the final in second place behind Sofia Raffaeli. In the final, she was the only competitor with multiple scores above 36, and she won the competition, making her the first German rhythmic gymnast to win an Olympic gold medal and the first rhythmic gymnast to win a medal for Germany since Regina Weber won a bronze at the 1984 Summer Olympics. She said of her result, "It's difficult to say something right now. I'm really happy and I'm still not really believing it."

On November 4, her 18th birthday, she was awarded the Silbernes Lorbeerblatt (Silver Laurel Leaf), the highest sports award in Germany, by president Frank-Walter Steinmeier. Later in November, she competed in the final of the rhythmic gymnastics Bundesliga; she and Anna-Maria Shatokhin contributed the most points for their club, TSV Schmieden, which won the competition. Varfolomeev noted the size of the audience at the competition and said, "In most cases, we don't have such a full hall, which makes me even happier that so many are now interested in our sport".

==== 2025 season: Two-time World champion ====
Varfolomeev spent the first part of the season balancing training, finishing her secondary education, and working to attain her driver's license, which she described as a stressful workload, though she also said, "I try to solve every problem with a smile." She also grew another 6 centimeters (2.4 inches) over the year, which she said she continuously needed to adjust to.

She began her season in late February by competing for the Italian club Motto Viareggio during the first stage of the Italian Serie A1 club championship. She performed her clubs routine and received the highest score of the day, and Motto Viareggio won the competition. On April 18-20, she competed at Baku World Cup and took 4th place in the all-around. She failed to qualify for the hoop final, but she finished fifth in the ball final and took home gold medals in the clubs and ribbon finals. The week after, she competed at her next World Cup in Tashkent, where she won the all-around silver medal behind Takhmina Ikromova after a tiebreak; they both scored 112.25 points, but Ikromova had the higher execution score. Although she had issues with her apparatus during her qualifying hoop routine, she qualified to the ball, clubs, and ribbon apparatus finals and won gold in all three.

Ahead of the European Championships in June, Varfolomeev noted that she was still becoming used to her new routines and said that she was "maybe at 40 percent" in feeling confident with them. She won the bronze medal in the all-around final and took 4th place in the team competition with the German senior group, Anastasia Simakova and Lada Pusch. Of her performance, she noted that, "Not everything went according to plan today," but said she was happy to have won the bronze medal. In the apparatus finals, she placed fifth with hoop and won gold with her ribbon routine; she said that she was confident in the routine and that she was happy to have performed it as she did in training.

Varfolomeev won Germany's first qualifying event for the World Championships ahead of Margarita Kolosov. She returned to international competition on July 18, at the World Cup Milan, where she won the silver medal in the all-around behind Sofia Raffaeli. She won the gold medal in the ball final, while in the other finals she placed sixth in the hoop and fourth in both the clubs and ribbon after making several errors. A week later, she competed in the World Cup Challenge Cluj-Napoca, where she won the gold medal in the all-around. In the end of July, she won every gold medal in the all-around and all apparatus finals at the 2025 German National Championships. Afterward, she rated her preparation at "90 percent", and she credited the increase in her performance to being able to focus on training after having completed her school exams.

At the 2025 World Championships held in Rio de Janeiro, Brazil, Varfolomeev represented Germany along with her teammate Anastasia Simakova. She qualified to the all-around final in first place. During the final, after her first routine with the clubs, she did not look at her interim scores. She ultimately defended her title, winning gold above Stiliana Nikolova and Sofia Raffaeli. During the medal ceremony, the national anthem for Georgia was mistakenly played rather than that of Germany. In the event finals, Varfolomeev took all but one apparatus title, nearly repeating her result from 2023; she did not medal in hoop after she fell out of a turn onto her hands. She also won gold in the team event with the other German gymnasts, for a total of five gold medals.

In December, she competed one routine, hoop, in the final of the rhythmic gymnastics Bundesliga; she earned the highest score for her club, TSV Schmiden, which won the competition.

==== 2026 season: Three-time World Champion ====
Varfolomeev presented her new routines (hoop and clubs) in March at Gymnastik International Fellbach-Schmiden, and she won gold medals with both. Then she competed at the International Tournament MTM Cup in Ljubljana, winning gold in clubs and ribbon. On April 10-12, she competed at Tashkent World Cup and won the silver medal in the all-around behind Maria Borisova. She took gold in the clubs and ribbon finals and bronze in the hoop final. Later in April, she won the silver medal in the all-around behind Taisiia Onofriichuk at the Baku World Cup. In the finals, she won three more gold medals (ball, clubs, ribbon).

In May, at the 2026 European Championships, Varfolomeev was the dominant gymnast, winning the all-around title for the first time as well as the ball and ribbon finals. She placed 4th in the hoop final and missed qualifying for the clubs final. She said afterward, "I have already won all the big titles in the all-around - except at the European Championships. Now the gold medal is finally here. That makes me very happy and grateful." During the competition, she struggled with nausea and pain from a wisdom tooth.

In an interview released in May, Varfolomeev was critical of the level of funding given to athletes in Germany. She said that while she was grateful to have received funding since 2019, without the money she received being directly contingent on her competitive success, and that it had allowed her career to begin, as a top athlete, she received €800 a month, which was not enough to live independently. Varfolomeev stated that she felt lucky to be supported by her parents and to receive her leotards - which would normally cost €1000 each - for free, which she noted was the case for very few other gymnasts.

In June, she won gold medal in all-around at World Challenge Cup Cluj-Napoca. She qualified to all four apparatus finals, winning gold in clubs and silver in hoop. She placed 7th in ball and ribbon finals. In July, she competed at the Milan World Cup and ended in won gold medal in all-around. She also won gold medals in ball and clubs finals. After the conclusion of the World Cup series, Varfolomeev won four out of the five individual trophies for success over the course of the series; she lost only the hoop title, won by Taisiia Onofriichuk.

In July, she won the gold medal in the all-around at the 2026 German national championships. She also won gold in the hoop and ball finals and bronze with ribbon. A record number of spectators, more than 3,000, attended the championships, which was attributed to Varfolomeev popularizing the sport in Germany; the upcoming 2026 World Championships in Frankfurt were also sold out. She was selected to represent Germany alongside Lada Pusch and Anastasia Simakova at the World Championships.

At the World Championships, she placed first in the qualifying round and qualified for three of the four apparatus finals. She missed the clubs final, and so she was not able to defend the World clubs title she had held since 2022. Varfolomeev said "it's very, very annoying" but that she was happy she had made the other finals. In the all-around final, she began with mistakes in her hoop routine, but she delivered stronger performances with the other three apparatuses to win her third consecutive all-around World title.

== Achievements ==
- First German rhythmic gymnast to win a medal in an individual apparatus final at the European Championships since 1980, making her the first German rhythmic gymnast to medal in an individual apparatus final at European Championships after the reunification of Germany.
- First German rhythmic gymnast to win two medals in individual apparatus finals at the European Championships.
- First German rhythmic gymnast to win gold, or any medal, in an all-around final at the European Championships.
- First German rhythmic gymnast to win gold, or any medal, in an individual apparatus final at the World Championships since 1975, making her the first German rhythmic gymnast to become a World Champion after the reunification of Germany.
- First German rhythmic gymnast to win a medal in an all-around final at World Championships since 1975, making her the first German rhythmic gymnast to achieve this after the reunification of Germany.
- First German rhythmic gymnast to win an Olympic gold medal.

== Awards ==
- Piotr Nurowski Prize (2023)
- Runner-up in German Sportswoman of the Year (2023, 2025)
- Athlete of the Month (2023, 2025 and 2026)
- German Sportswoman of the Year (2024)
- German Sportswoman of the Year of the state capital of Stuttgart (2024)
- Silbernes Lorbeerblatt (2024)
- Sport Bild-Award: Star of the Year (2024)
- Flatow Medaille (2025)
- Carl-Schuhmann-Medaille (2025)
- AGF Trophy (2026)

== Detailed Olympic results ==
Year	Competition Description	Location	Music	Apparatus	Rank-Final	Score-Final	Rank-Qualifying	Score-Qualifying
2024	Olympics	Paris		All-around	1st	142.850	2nd	136.850
2024	Olympics	Paris	"Jackseye's Tale, Escape from East Berlin, Take You Down" by Daniel Pemberton	Hoop	1st	36.300	12th	32.500
2024	Olympics	Paris	"In the Closet" by Michael Jackson	Ball	1st	36.500	1st	36.450
2024	Olympics	Paris	"Batshit - Ilkay Sencan Remix" by Sofi Tukker	Clubs	1st	36.350	1st	35.250
2024	Olympics	Paris	"Generali" by HAVASI	Ribbon	2nd	33.700	3rd	32.650

== Routine music information ==
Year	Apparatus	Music Title
2026	Hoop (first)	Durch den Monsun by Tokio Hotel
2026	Hoop (second)	Lovely (Cover) by Lauren Babic & Jordan Radvansky
2026	Ball	Wrong Party by Elenoir
2026	Clubs	Dame Un Grrr (Provi Extended Remix) by Fantomel, KATE LINN & Provi
2026	Ribbon	Trouble by Jake Warren & Dana Kelson
2025	Hoop	Lovely (Cover) by Lauren Babic & Jordan Radvansky
2025	Ball	In the Closet by Michael Jackson
2025	Clubs	Batshit - Ilkay Sencan Remix by Sofi Tukker
2025	Ribbon	Trouble by Jake Warren & Dana Kelson
2025	Gala	Abracadabra by Lady Gaga
2025	Gala	I See Red by Everybody Loves an Outlaw
2024	Hoop	Jackseye's Tale, Escape from East Berlin, Take You Down by Daniel Pemberton
2024	Ball	In the Closet by Michael Jackson
2024	Clubs	Batshit - Ilkay Sencan Remix by Sofi Tukker
2024	Ribbon	Generali by HAVASI
2023	Hoop	Jackseye's Tale, Escape from East Berlin, Take You Down by Daniel Pemberton
2023	Ball	Mercy (Remix) by Duffy
2023	Clubs	Calabria /Destination Calabria by Alex Gaudino, Crystal Waters
2023	Ribbon	Generali by HAVASI
2022	Hoop	John Drops In by John Powell
2022	Ball	Mercy (Remix) by Duffy
2022	Clubs	Calabria /Destination Calabria by Alex Gaudino, Crystal Waters
2022	Ribbon	Doowit by Pharrell Williams
2021	Hoop	John Drops In by John Powell
2021	Ball	Ojos Así (Thunder Mix) by Shakira
2021	Clubs	On The Floor by Jennifer Lopez feat Pitbull
2021	Ribbons	The Duel by HAVASI
2020	Rope	Ride by ZZ WARD feat Gary Clark jr
2020	Ball	Ojos Así (Thunder Mix) by Shakira
2020	Clubs	On The Floor by Jennifer Lopez feat Pitbull
2020	Ribbon	
2019	Rope	
2019	Ball	Ojos Así (Thunder Mix) by Shakira
2019	Clubs	Tico Tico by Dalida
2019	Ribbon	

== Competitive highlights ==
(Team competitions in seniors are held only at the World Championships, Europeans and other Continental Games.)

International: Senior
Year	Event	AA	Team	Hoop	Ball	Clubs	Ribbon
2026	World Championships	1st	4th	3rd	1st	9th (Q)	1st
2026	World Cup Milan	1st		5th	1st	1st	7th
2026	World Challenge Cup Cluj-Napoca	1st		2nd	7th	1st	7th
2026	European Championships	1st	5th	4th	1st	11th (Q)	1st
2026	World Challenge Cup Portimão	9th		6th	28th (Q)	18th (Q)	8th
2026	World Cup Baku	2nd		8th	1st	1st	1st
2026	World Cup Tashkent	2nd		3rd	5th	1st	1st
2026	MTM Ljubljana					1st	1st
2026	Gymnastik International Fellbach-Schmiden			1st		1st	
2025	World Championships	1st	1st	5th	1st	1st	1st
2025	World Cup Challenge Cluj-Napoca	1st		2nd	1st	3rd	6th
2025	World Cup Milan	2nd		6th	1st	4th	4th
2025	European Championships	3rd	4th	5th		9th(Q)	1st
2025	World Cup Tashkent	2nd		11th (Q)	1st	1st	1st
2025	World Cup Baku	4th		15th (Q)	5th	1st	1st
2025	Gymnastik International Fellbach-Schmiden				3rd	2nd	
2024	Olympic Games	1st					
2024	World Challenge Cup Cluj-Napoca	2nd		4th	1st	1st	8th
2024	World Cup Milan	1st		4th	1st	1st	2nd
2024	European Championships	3rd	4th		4th	10th (Q)	1st
2024	World Challenge Cup Portimão	1st		1st	7th	1st	1st
2024	World Cup Tashkent	1st		2nd	2nd	1st	1st
2024	World Cup Baku	1st		1st	1st	3rd	1st
2024	Grand Prix Marbella	3rd		1st	12th (Q)	6th	7th
2024	Gymnastik International Fellbach-Schmiden				1st	1st	
2023	Aeon Cup	1st	1st				
2023	World Championships	1st	2nd	1st	1st	1st	1st
2023	World Cup Milan	1st		3rd	1st	1st	3rd
2023	World Challenge Cup Cluj-Napoca	3rd		5th	12th (Q)	2nd	1st
2023	European Championships	4th	5th	12th (Q)	5th	5th	1st
2023	World Challenge Cup Portimão	1st		1st	3rd	1st	1st
2023	World Cup Baku	4th		8th	1st	3rd	24th (Q)
2023	World Cup Tashkent	5th		6th	19th (Q)	2nd	2nd
2023	Gymnastik International Fellbach-Schmiden				1st	1st	
2022	World Championships	2nd	2nd	3rd	2nd	1st	10th (Q)
2022	World Challenge Cup Cluj-Napoca	6th		9th (Q)	4th	4th	9th (Q)
2022	European Championships	5th	5th	9th (Q)	3rd	3rd	6th
2022	World Challenge Cup Portimão	2nd		2nd	1st	1st	5th
2022	World Challenge Cup Pamplona	4th		12th (Q)	1st	4th	1st
2022	World Cup Tashkent	3rd		3rd	2nd	4th	2nd
International: Junior
Year	Event	AA	Team	Rope	Ball	Clubs	Ribbon
2019	Junior World Championships		15th			15th (Q)	
National: Senior
Year	Event	AA	Team	Hoop	Ball	Clubs	Ribbon
2026	German Championships	1st		1st	1st	5th	3rd
2025	German Championships	1st		1st	1st	1st	1st
2024	German Championships	2nd		1st	2nd	1st	1st
2023	German Championships	1st		1st	1st	1st	1st
2022	German Championships	1st		1st	1st	1st	3rd
National: Junior
Year	Event	AA	Team	Hoop	Ball	Clubs	Ribbon
2021	German Junior Championships	1st					
Year	Event	AA	Team	Rope	Ball	Clubs	Ribbon
2019	German Junior Championships	1st		2nd	1st	2nd	1st
Q = Qualifications (Did not advance to Event Final due to the 2 gymnast per country rule, only Top 8 highest score, no Event Finals held); WD = Withdrew

== See also ==
- List of medalists at the Rhythmic Gymnastics World Championships
