= List of people from Gdańsk =

This is a list of people from Gdańsk, Poland.

== Before 16th century ==
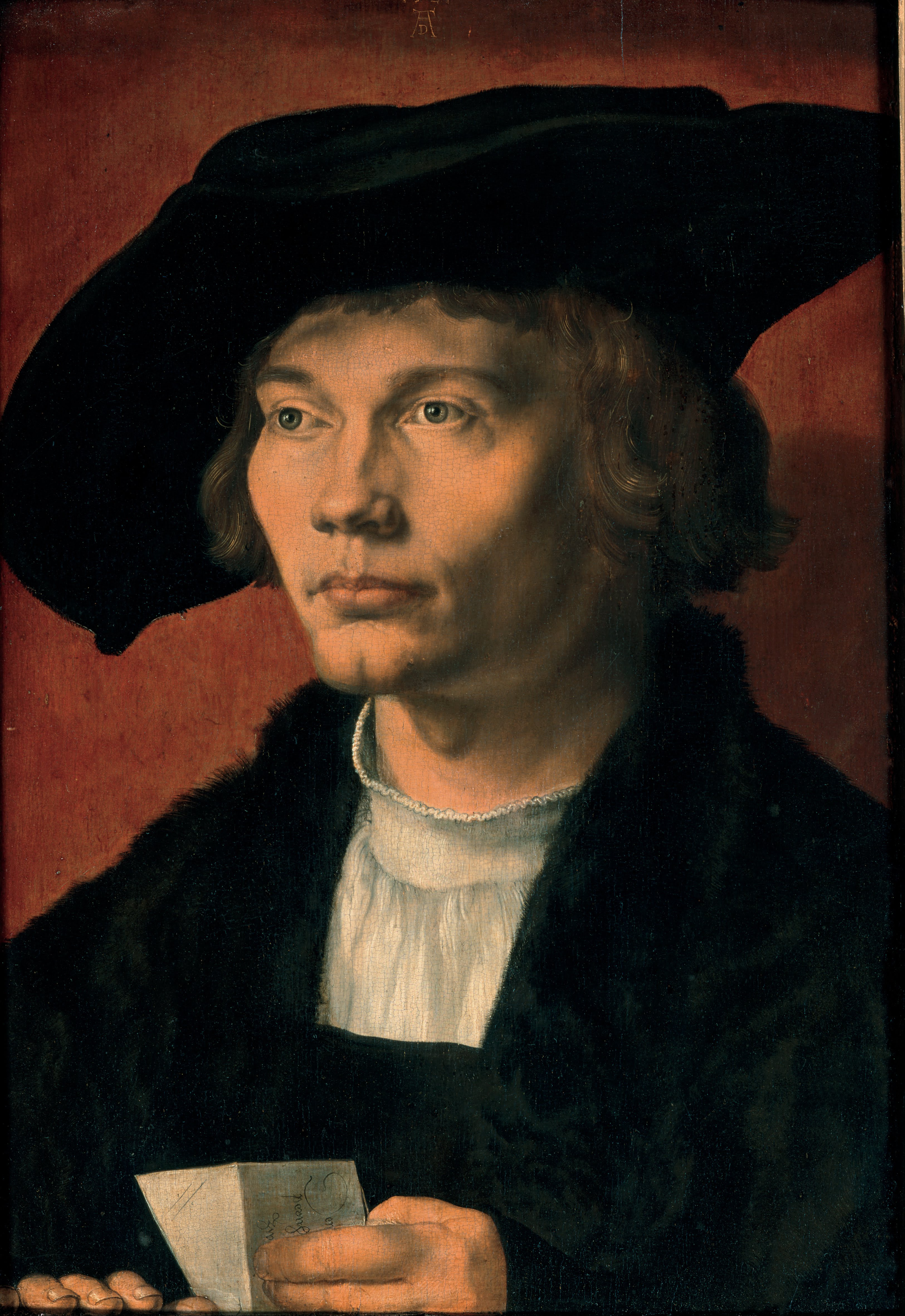
Portrait of Bernhard von Reesen, 1521

- Conrad Letzkau (ca. 1350 – 1411), mayor, executed by the Teutonic Knights
- Tiedemann Giese (1480–1550), bishop
- Johannes Dantiscus (1485–1548), poet, church canon and bishop
- Bernhard von Reesen (1491–1521), businessman painted by Albrecht Dürer

== 16th century ==
- Albrecht Giese (1524–1580), councillor and diplomat
- Caspar Schütz (c. 1540–1594), Prussian historian
- Anton Möller (1563–1611), painter
- Bartholomäus Keckermann (c. 1571–1608), writer and Calvinist theologist
- Regina Basilier (1572–1631), German-Swedish merchant banker
- Philipp Clüver (1580–1622) an Early Modern geographer and historian.

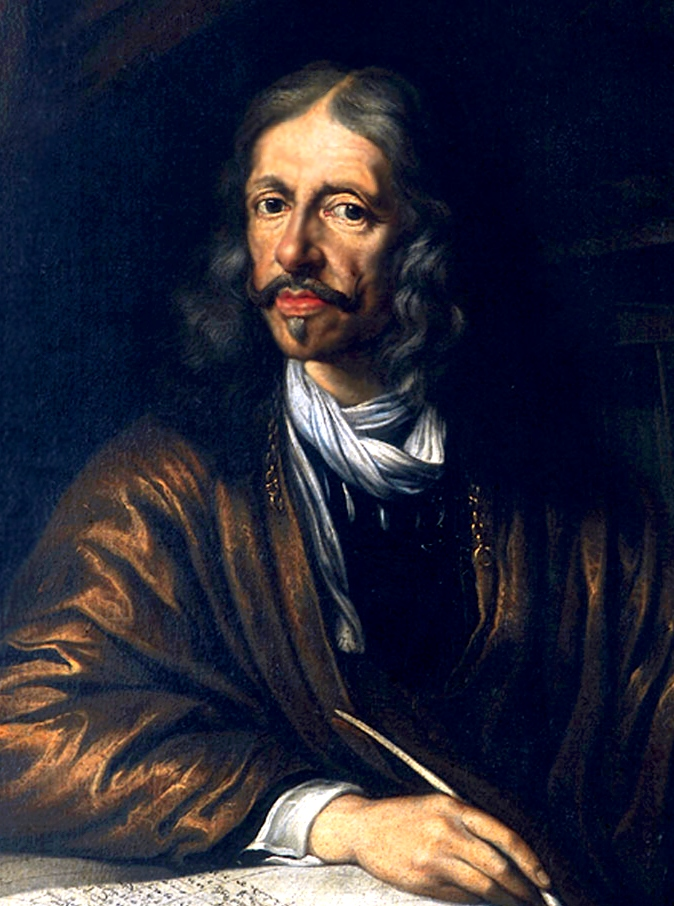
Portrait of Johannes Hevelius, 1683

== 17th century ==
- Constantia Zierenberg (1605–1653), a singer and musician; daughter of Danzig mayor
- Reinhold Curicke (1610–1667), jurist, historian
- Johannes Hevelius (1611–1687), astronomer.
- Georg Daniel Schultz (1615–1683), painter
- Bogusław Radziwiłł (1620–1669), Prince of Polish-Lithuanian Commonwealth, Reichsfürst of the HRE, governor of Ducal Prussia
- Andreas Schlüter (1659–c.1714), architect and sculptor
- Daniel Ernst Jablonski (1660–1741) a theologian.
- Jacob Theodor Klein (1685–1759), jurist, historian, botanist, mathematician and diplomat
- Daniel Gottlieb Messerschmidt (1685–1735) physician, naturalist, geographer
- Daniel Gabriel Fahrenheit (1686–1736) a physicist, inventor and scientific instrument maker.
- Gottfried Lengnich (1689–1774), jurist, historian

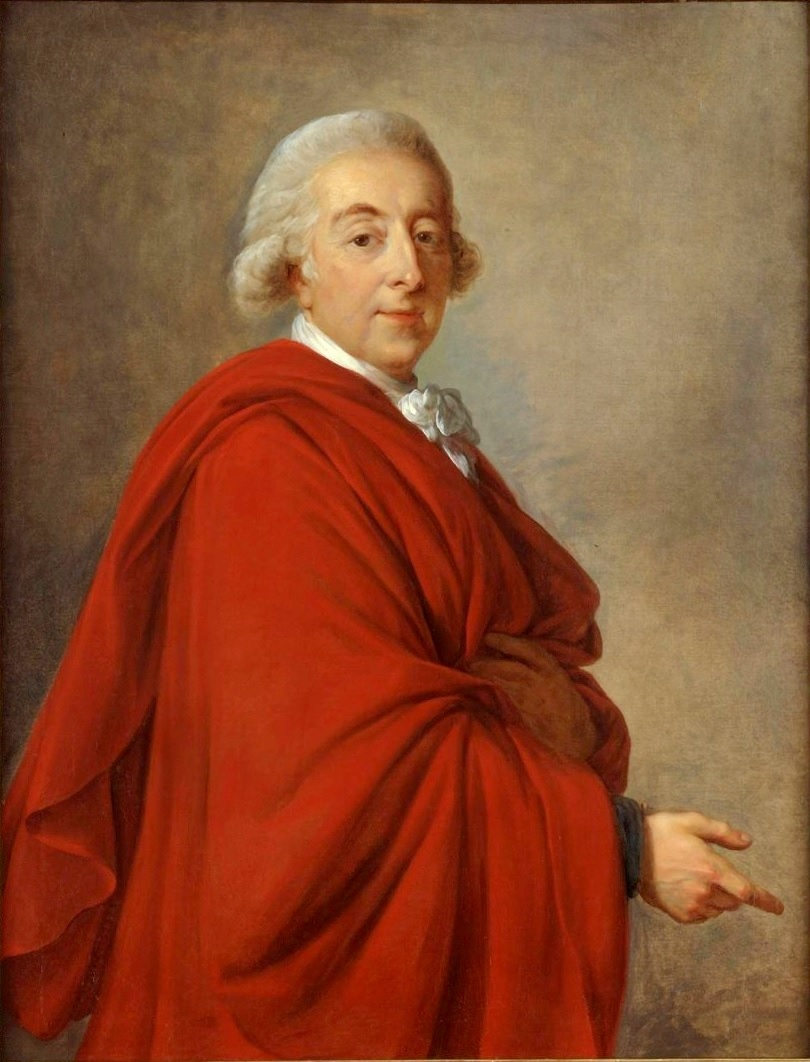
Portrait of Adam Kazimierz Czartoryski, 1793

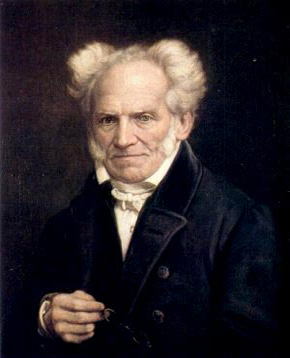
Painting of Arthur Schopenhauer, 1855

== 18th century ==
- Johann Valentin Haidt (1700–1780), painter and preacher
- Daniel Gralath (1708–1767), physicist and Bürgermeister (mayor) of Danzig
- Louise Adelgunde Gottsched (1713–1762), writer
- Nikita Panin (1718–1783) a Russian statesman and political mentor to Catherine the Great.
- Sir Trevor Corry (1724–1780), diplomat; Baron of Poland; British Consul to Danzig 1745–1780
- Daniel Chodowiecki (1726–1801), artist and painter.
- Adam Kazimierz Czartoryski (1734–1823), Prince, writer, literary and theatre critic.
- Michał Jerzy Poniatowski (1736–1794), primate of Poland
- Johann Wilhelm Archenholz (1741–1812), historian and publicist.
- Avraham Danzig (1748–1820), rabbi
- Georg Forster (1754–1794), naturalist, ethnologist, travel writer, journalist and revolutionary.
- Jacob Kabrun Jr. (1759–1814), merchant, book and art collector, and philanthropist
- Jakob Sigismund Beck (1761–1840) a philosopher.
- Johanna Schopenhauer (1766–1838), author; mother of Arthur Schopenhauer
- Johannes Daniel Falk (1768–1826), poet and educator.
- Antonio Casimir Cartellieri (1772–1807), composer
- Arthur Schopenhauer (1788–1860), philosopher.

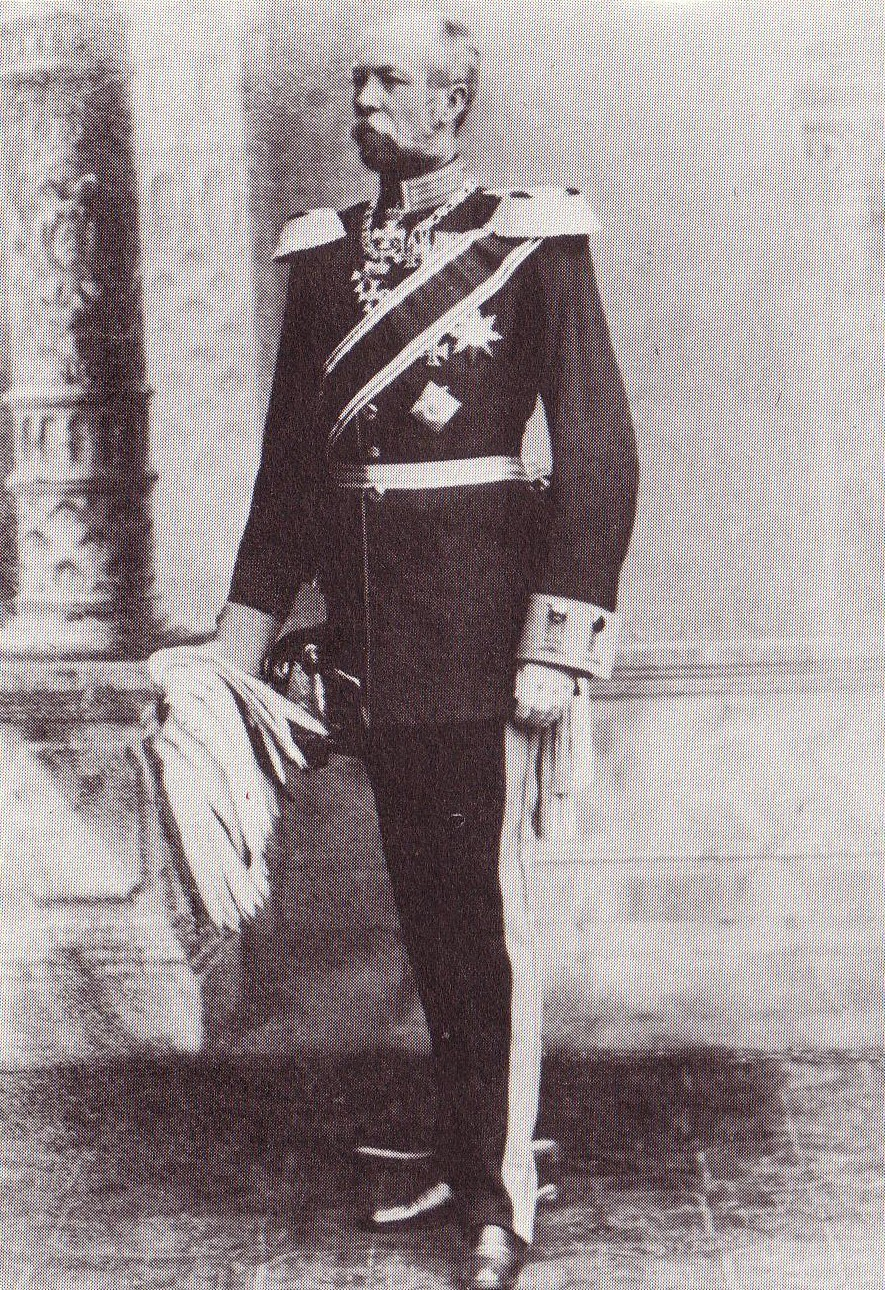
Paul Bronsart von Schellendorf

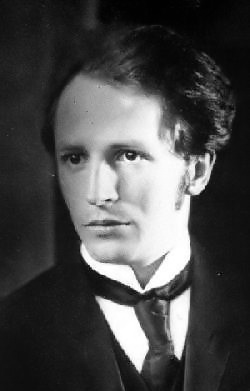
Carl Schuricht, 1910

== 19th century ==
- Heinrich von Zastrow (1801–1875), general
- Heinrich Wilhelm Zimmerman (1805–1841), portrait painter
- Rachel Meyer (1806–1874), writer
- Joachim Marquardt (1812–1882) an historian and writer on Roman antiquities.
- Eduard Hildebrandt (1818–1868) a landscape painter.
- Ernst Förstemann (1822–1906), historian, mathematician, philologist
- Paul Bronsart von Schellendorf (1832–1891), general, writer.
- Eduard Winkelmann (1838–1896) an historian.
- Stefan Pawlicki (1839–1916), Catholic priest and philosopher
- Anna Tuschinski (1841–1939), Esperantist
- Fritz von Below (1853–1918), general
- Otto von Below (1857–1944), general
- August von Brandis (1859–1947), artist
- Hugo Münsterberg (1863–1916) psychologist.
- Max Halbe (1865–1944), writer
- Käthe Schirmacher (1865–1930), feminist, writer and journalist
- Max Adalbert (1874–1933), actor
- Alfred Stock (1876–1946), chemist
- Carl Schuricht (1880–1967), conductor
- Marta Wittkowska (1882–1977), contralto opera singer
- Alice Wosikowski (1886–1949), politician, resistance activist
- Gerhard Rose (1896–1992), expert on tropical medicine

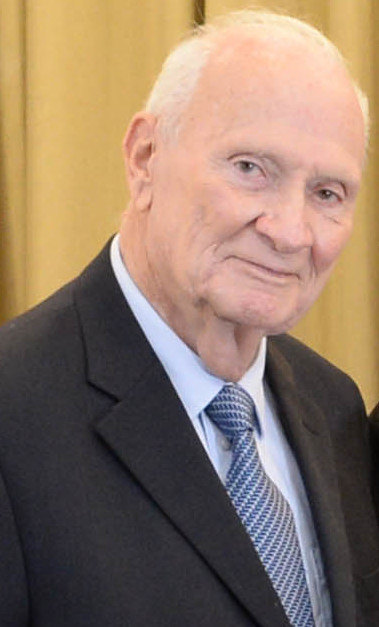
Meir Shamgar, 2015

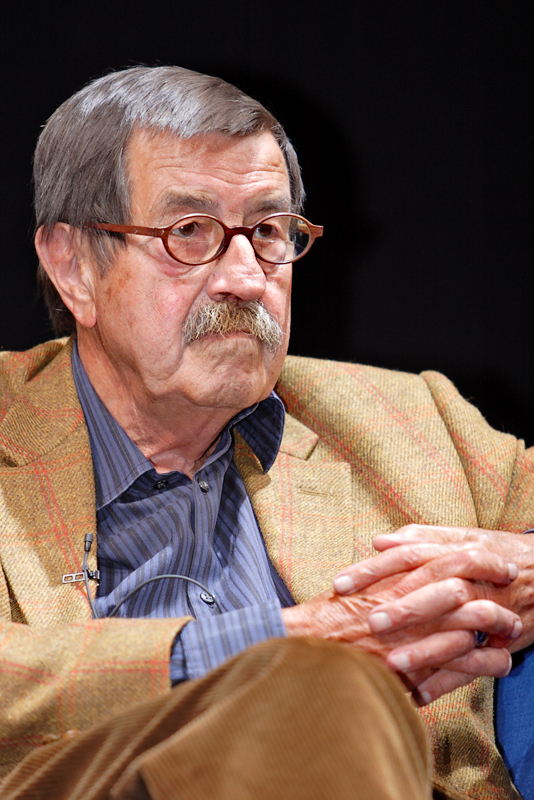
Günter Grass, 2006

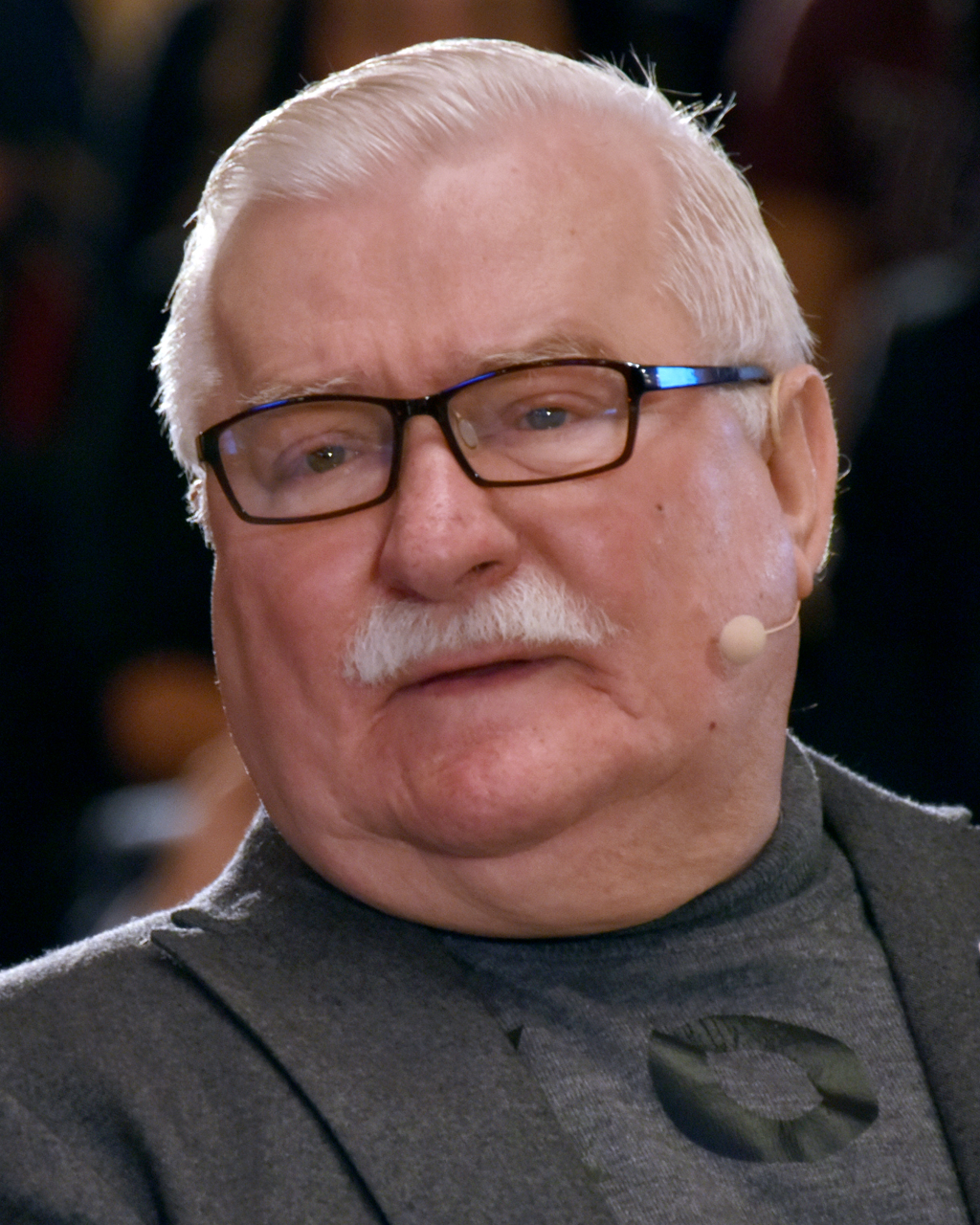
Lech Wałęsa, 2019

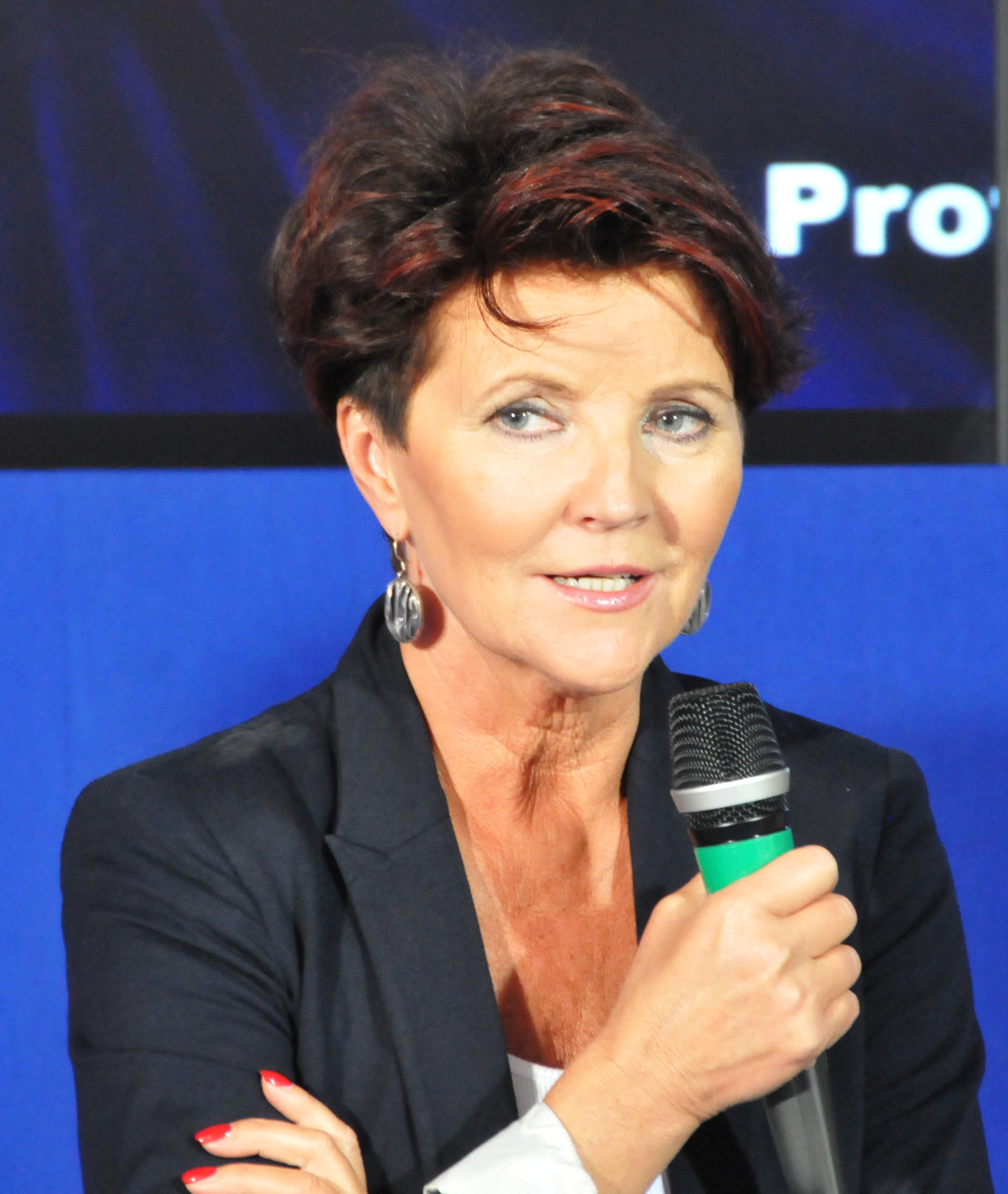
Jolanta Kwaśniewska, 2011

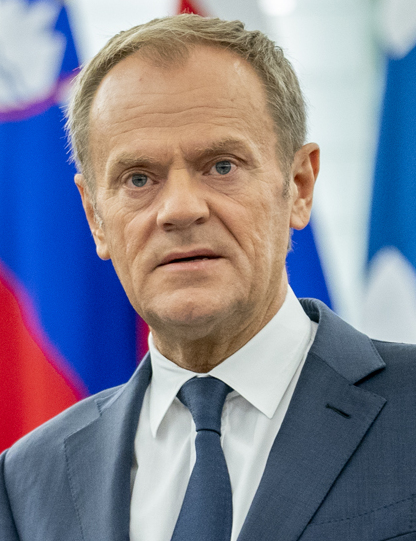
Donald Tusk, 2019

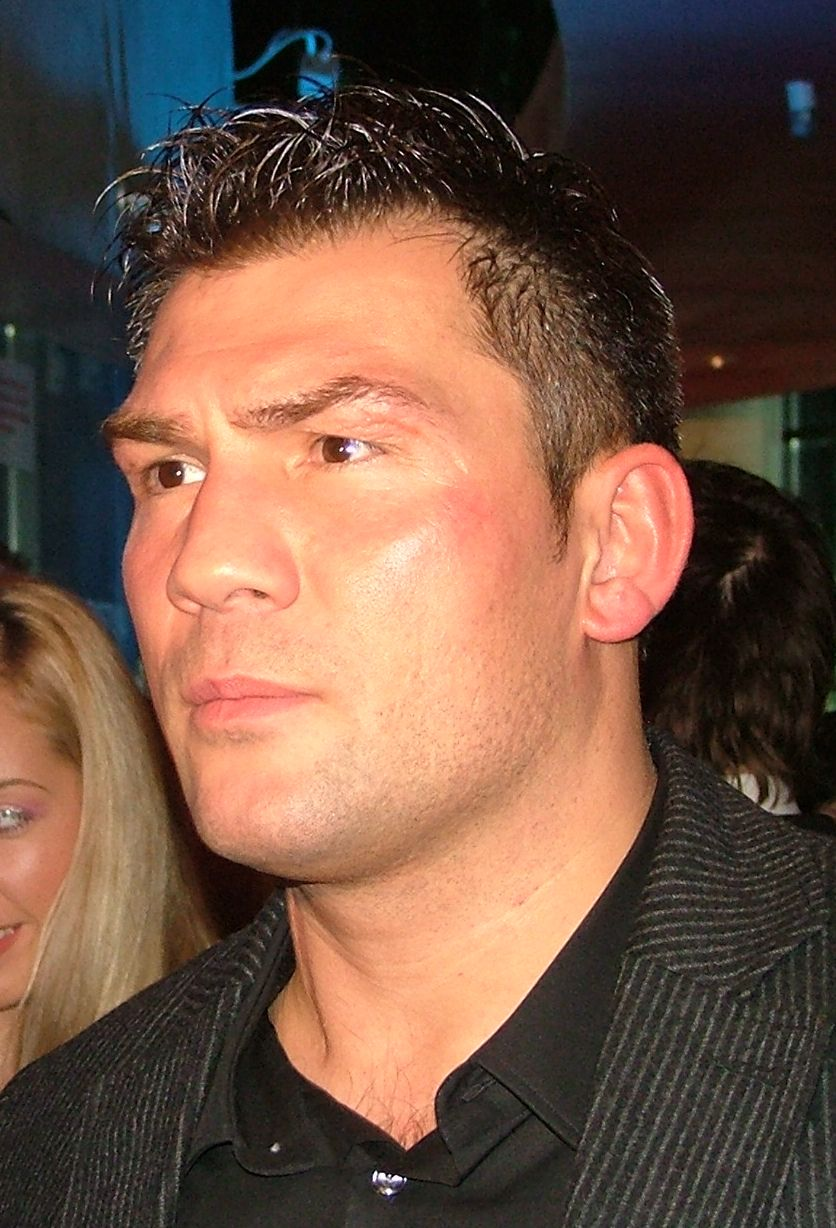
Dariusz Michalczewski, 2007

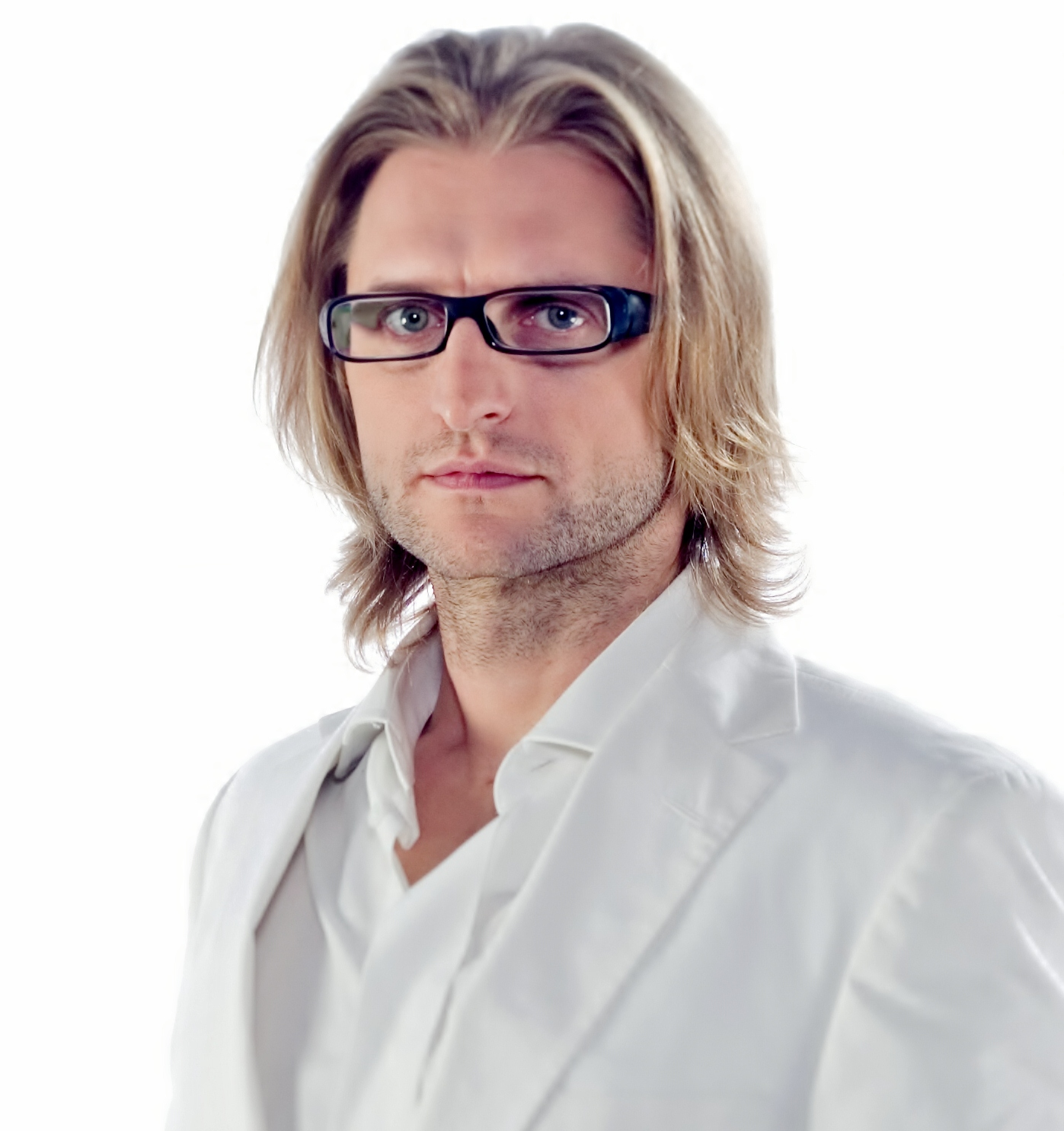
Leszek Możdżer, 2010

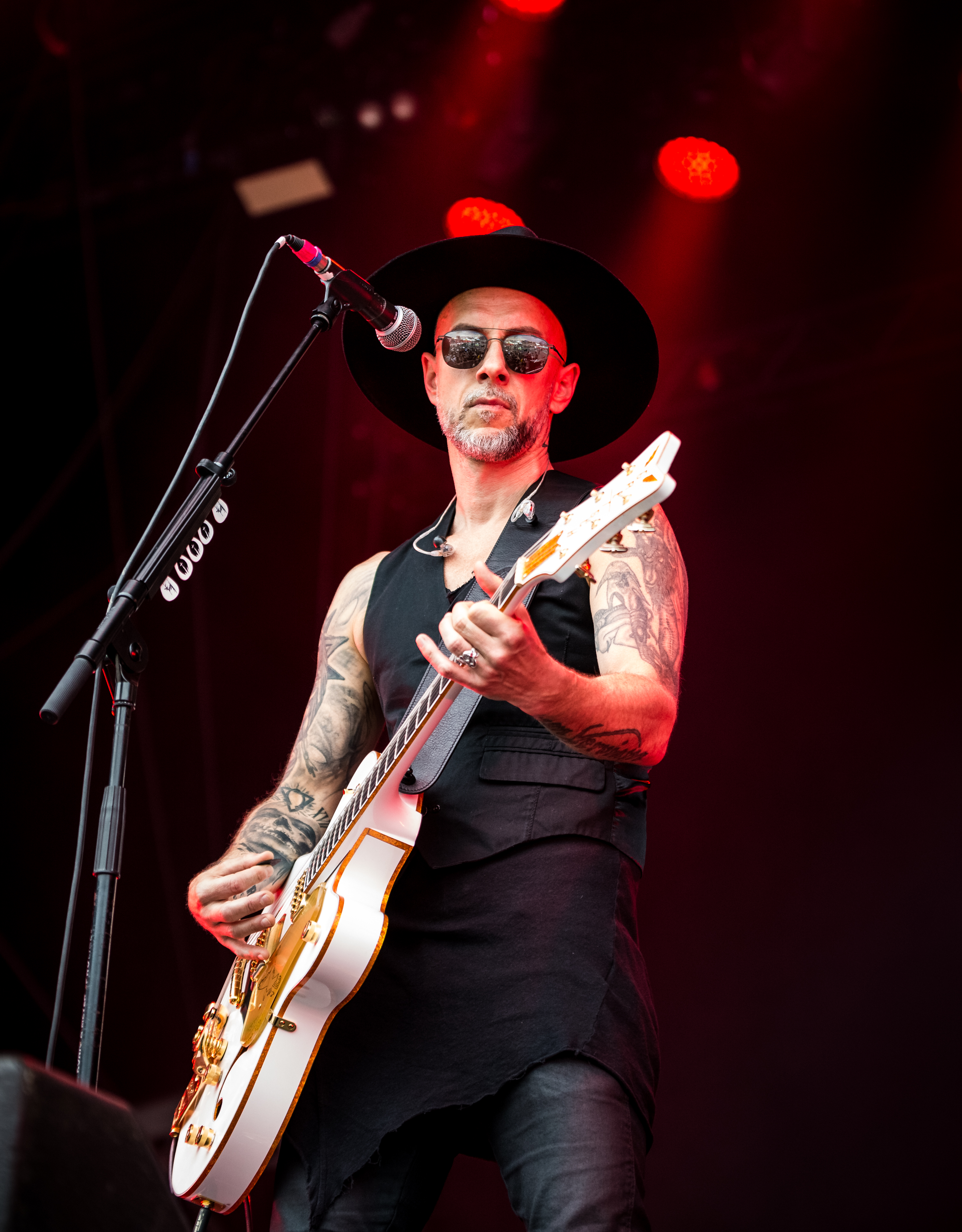
Adam Darski, 2017

== 1900–1945 ==
- Gerhard Krüger (1908–1994), a Nazi Party student leader
- Hermann Diamanski (1909–1976), German resistance fighter
- Alfred Zeidler (1902–?), German SS concentration camp commandant
- Mathias Goeritz (1915–1990), artist
- Alexander Salkind (1921–1997), film producer
- Wanda Klaff (1922–1946), German Nazi concentration camp overseer executed for war crimes
- Heinz-Hermann Koelle (1922–2011), German-American aeronautical and rocket engineer
- Elisabeth Becker (1923–1946), German SS concentration camp guard executed for war crimes
- Miltiades Caridis (1923–1998), conductor
- Eddi Arent (1925–2013), actor and comedian
- Meir Shamgar (1925–2019), President of the Israel Supreme Court
- Zygmunt Chychła (1926–2009), boxer
- Jack Mandelbaum (1927–2023), subject of Surviving Hitler: A Boy in the Nazi Death Camps
- Günter Grass (1927–2015), writer, recipient of 1999 Nobel Prize in Literature
- Henry Rosovsky (1927–2022), economist
- Zalman Shoval (born 1930), Israeli banker, politician and diplomat
- Wolfgang Völz (1930–2018), actor and voice actor
- Ingrid van Bergen (1931–2025), actress
- Jan Strelau (1931–2020), psychologist
- Jutta Meischner (born 1935), classical archeologist
- Richard Pratt (1935–2009), Australian businessman and philanthropist
- Holger Czukay (1938–2017), musician
- Wawrzyniec Samp (born 1939), sculptor and graphic artist
- Dietrich Albrecht (born 1940), football player
- Matthias Habich (born 1940), actor
- Heidrun Mohr-Mayer (1941–2014), jeweler
- Ryszard Horodecki (born 1943), physicist
- Lech Wałęsa (born 1943), politician
- Detlev Buchholz (born 1944), theoretical physicist

== Since 1945 ==
- Mariola Grażyna Antczak (born 1970), data scientist
- Józef Borzyszkowski (born 1946), historian, politician and Kashubian activist
- Krzysztof Majchrzak (born 1948), film actor
- Jacek Namieśnik (1949–2019), chemist
- Andrzej Szarmach (born 1950), football player
- Krzysztof Kolberger (1950–2011), actor
- Jan de Weryha-Wysoczanski (born 1950), sculptor
- Bogusław Jackowski (born 1950), computer scientist
- Jadwiga Jankowska-Cieślak (1951–2025), film actress
- Jerzy Samp (born 1951), writer and historian
- Bogdan Wojciszke (born 1952), psychologist
- Maciej Żylicz (born 1953), biochemist and molecular biologist
- Tomasz Imieliński (born 1954), computer scientist
- Janusz Pawliszyn (born 1954), chemist
- Janina Ochojska (born 1955), humanitarian, social activist and astronomer, founder and director of the Polish Humanitarian Action
- Jolanta Kwaśniewska (born 1955), former First Lady of Poland
- Krzysztof Pastor (born 1956), dancer, choreographer and director of the Polish National Ballet
- Barbara Tuge-Erecińska (born 1956), diplomat
- Pawel Huelle (born 1957), writer and journalist
- Donald Tusk (born 1957), former President of the European Council & Prime Minister of Poland, journalist and historian
- Marek Kamiński (born 1964), traveler
- Paweł Adamowicz (1965–2019), politician, Mayor of Gdańsk
- Aneta Kręglicka (born 1965), model and dancer, Miss World 1989
- Grzegorz Kacała (born 1966), rugby player
- Giennadij Jerszow (born 1967), sculptor
- Dariusz Michalczewski (born 1968), boxer
- Mariusz Podkościelny (born 1968), freestyle swimmer and swimming coach
- Leszek Możdżer (born 1971), jazz pianist
- Tomasz Wałdoch (born 1971), footballer
- Adam Korol (born 1974), rower and politician
- Sławomir Nowak (born 1974), former Minister of Transport & Construction
- Szymon Roginski (born 1975), photographer
- Agnieszka Chylińska (born 1976), singer-songwriter, actress, author and television personality
- Gregorz Szamotulski (born 1976), footballer
- Jarosław Wałęsa (born 1976), politician, son of Lech Wałęsa
- Adam Darski (born 1977), singer and guitarist, frontman of extreme metal band Behemoth
- Robert Kempiński (born 1977), chess grandmaster
- Tomasz Schafernaker (born 1979), Polish-British meteorologist for BBC Weather
- Jacek Dehnel (born 1980), writer, poet, translator and painter
- Abelard Giza (born 1980), Polish comedian, writer, filmmaker, and actor
- Magdalena Tul (born 1980), singer and composer
- Dawid Tomaszewski (born 1980), fashion designer
- Jakobe Mansztajn (born 1982), poet, blogger
- Karol Nawrocki (born 1983), Polish historian and current president
- Magdalena Frąckowiak (born 1984), model
- Ewa Juszkiewicz (born 1984), painter
- Aleksandra Kosiorek (born 1985), politician and jurist
- Izu Ugonoh (born 1986), boxer and mixed martial artist
- Piotr Witkowski (born 1988), actor
- Oskar Piechota (born 1990), mixed martial artist
- Hania Rani (born 1990), pianist, composer and singer
- Jakub Pachocki (born 1991), computer scientist
- Moustapha M'Baye (born 1992), volleyball player
- Mateusz Biskup (born 1994), rower
- Mateusz Mach (born 1997), entrepreneur and investor
- Mikolaj Oledzki (born 1998), Rugby League player
- Martyna Łukasik (born 1999), volleyball player

== See also ==
- Notable members of the Jewish community in Gdańsk
