= Maria Aszklar =

Polish rhythmic gymnast

- Born: 20 May 2009 (age 17) Warsaw

Gymnastics career
- Discipline: Rhythmic gymnastics
- Country represented: Poland (2022-present)
- Club: UKS PM Syrena
- Head coach: Inga Buczyńska
Medal record
Rhythmic gymnastics
Representing Poland
Event	1st	2nd	3rd
FIG World Cup	2	5	2
Total	2	5	2

Maria Aszklar (born 20 May 2009) is a Polish rhythmic gymnast. She represents Poland in international competitions as a member of the national group.

== Biography ==
Aszklar took up the sport in her third year of elementary school. In June 2021 she won bronze with ball at the National Youth Olympiad.

=== Junior ===
In January 2022 she was called up to enter the Polish junior national team. In September she was selected to be part of the junior group for the following year's World Championships.

In March 2023 she made her group debut at the Gymnastik International in Schmiden. At the Aphrodite Cup Poland was 5th with 5 ropes and 8th with 5 balls. In May the group took 6th place overall and 7th with 54 balls at the European Championships in Baku. She was then selected for the 2nd Junior World Championships in Cluj-Napoca along Pola Gałązka, Sara Łakomczak, Pola Świętochowska, Melody Wasiewicz-Hanc and Ksenia Zhyzhych. There they were 18th in the All-Around and didn't qualify for the finals.

At the 2024 Gdynia Rhythmic Stars she took 6th place in the All-Around and won silver in the ball final.

=== Senior ===
She became age eligible for senior competitions in 2025, being incorporated into the Polish senior group. She made her debut at the World Cup in Sofia, winning bronze in the All-Around and with 5 ribbons with her group mates. In Tashkent they won gold in the All-Around and with 3 balls & 2 hoops as well as silver with 5 ribbons. In June she participated in the European Championships in Tallinn, finishing 7th overall and in the 5 ribbons final. The following month she won silver with 5 ribbons at the World Cup in Milan. A week later they won all three silver medals at the stage in Cluj-Napoca. In August, she competed at the 2025 World Championships in Rio de Janeiro, alongside Vesna Pietrzak, Madoka Przybylska, Magdalena Szewczuk, Melody Wasiewicz-Hanc and Julia Wojciechowska. They were 8th in All-Around, 7th with 5 ribbons and 8th with 3 balls & 2 hoops.
