= Wosikowski =

Wosikowski is a masculine Polish surname, its feminine counterpart is Wosikowska. Notable people with the surname include:

- Alice Wosikowski (1886–1949), German politician
- Irene Wosikowski (1910–1944), German political activist

== See also ==
- Wasikowski
