= Polish Rhythmic Gymnastics Championships =

The Polish Rhythmic Gymnastics Championships (pl. Mistrzostwa Polski w gimnastyce artystycznej) are a rhythmic gymnastics competition held annually to determine the national medalists of Poland. The event has been held annually since 1955.

The separate competitions are held individually, in groups and in teams, for all the age categories.

== Medalists ==
=== Senior medalists in individual All-around ===
All-around senior medalists
Year	Location	Gold	Silver	Bronze	Details
1955	Białystok	Elżbieta Zienkiewicz	unknown	unknown	
1961	Warsaw	Krystyna Magdziarz	unknown	unknown	
1962	Kraków	Krystyna Magdziarz	unknown	unknown	
1963	Poznań	Aleksandra Piątkowska	unknown	unknown	
1964	Gdańsk	Maria Stryjecka-Paszynin	unknown	unknown	
1965	Łódź	Czesława Tukendorf	unknown	unknown	
1966	Kraków	Żywilla Florkowska	Danuta Waligórska	unknown	
1967	Kalisz	Żywilla Florkowska	unknown	unknown	
1968	Poznań	Grażyna Bojarska	unknown	unknown	
1969	Warsaw	Grażyna Bojarska	unknown	unknown	
1970	Gdynia	Grażyna Bojarska	unknown	unknown	
1971	Poznań	Dorota Trafankowska	unknown	unknown	
1972	Warsaw	Jadwiga Hammerling	unknown	unknown	
1973	Katowice	Lucyna Czerwińska	unknown	unknown	
1974	Kalisz	Hanna Anczykowska	unknown	unknown	
1975	Szczecin	Hanna Anczykowska	unknown	unknown	
1976	Szczecin	Anna Kłos	unknown	unknown	
1977	Kraków	Renata Urbanik	Jadwiga Hammerling	Sławomira Sobkowska	
1978	Gdynia	Sławomira Sobkowska	Renata Urbanik	Ewa Figeland	
1979	Toruń	Sławomira Sobkowska	unknown	unknown	
1980	Szczecin	Anna Kłos	unknown	unknown	
1981	Wrocław	Danuta Leonard	unknown	unknown	
1982	Warsaw	Ewa Figeland	unknown	unknown	
1983	Kraków	Danuta Leonard	unknown	unknown	
1984	Szczecin	Teresa Folga	unknown	unknown	
1985	Poznań	Teresa Folga	unknown	unknown	
1986	Wrocław	Izabela Żurawska	unknown	unknown	
1987	Kraków	Teresa Folga	unknown	unknown	
1988	Jastrzębie-Zdrój	Teresa Folga	unknown	unknown	
1989	Olsztyn	Natalia Szymkiewicz	unknown	unknown	
1990	Olsztyn	Joanna Bodak	unknown	unknown	
1991	Katowice	Eliza Białkowska	unknown	unknown	
1992	Wrocław	Eliza Białkowska	unknown	unknown	
1993	Szczecin	Katarzyna Skorupińska	unknown	unknown	
1994	Gdynia	Ewa Zawalińska	unknown	unknown	
1995	Łódź	Anna Kwitniewska	unknown	unknown	
1996	Cetniewo	Anna Kwitniewska	unknown	unknown	
1997	Szczecin	Anna Kwitniewska	unknown	unknown	
1998	Olsztyn	Anna Kwitniewska	unknown	unknown	
1999	Gdańsk	Anna Kwitniewska	unknown	unknown	
2000	Biała Podlaska	Anna Kwitniewska	unknown	unknown	
2001	Zabrze	Magdalena Markowska	Katarzyna Cieślak	Anna Nowak	
2002	Szczecin	Magdalena Markowska	unknown	unknown	
2003	Biała Podlaska	Magdalena Markowska	Klaudia Rynkowska	Magdalena Gienieczko	
2004	Biała Podlaska	Magdalena Markowska	Joanna Mitrosz	Klaudia Rynkowska	
2005	Wrocław	Magdalena Markowska	Joanna Mitrosz	Anna Zdun	
2006	Iława	Joanna Mitrosz	Anna Zdun	Aleksandra Szutenberg	
2007	Kraków	Joanna Mitrosz	Anna Zdun	Marta Koczkowska	
2008	Szczecin	Joanna Mitrosz	Marta Koczkowska	Angelika Paradowska	
2009	Gdynia	Joanna Mitrosz	Angelika Paradowska	Joanna Narolska	
2010	Giżycko	Joanna Mitrosz	Marta Szamałek	Angelika Paradowska	
2011	Iława	Joanna Mitrosz	Anna Czarniecka	Maja Majerowska	
2012	Giżycko	Joanna Mitrosz	Maja Majerowska	Marta Jasińska	
2013	Iława	Anna Czarniecka	Maja Majerowska	Marta Jasińska	
2014	Iława	Anna Czarniecka	Marta Kulesza	Marta Jasińska	
2015	Łomianki	Anna Czarniecka	Angela Kosoulieva	Marta Kulesza	
2016	Zabrze	Angela Kosoulieva	Natalia Koziol	Julia Wiśniewska	
2017	Warsaw	Natalia Koziol	Małgorzata Romaniuk	Natalia Kulig	
2018	Gdańsk	Natalia Koziol	Małgorzata Romaniuk	Natalia Kulig	
2020		Alicja Dobrołęcka	Małgorzata Roszatycka	Milena Górska	
2023	Kraków	Emilia Heichel	Nadia Schmidt	Emilia Komarewicz	
2024	Warsaw	Liliana Lewińska	Emilia Heichel	Nadia Schmidt	
2025	Kraków	Liliana Lewińska	Emilia Heichel	Hanna Sablinska	
2026	Kraków	Liliana Lewińska	Emilia Heichel	Mariia Shybanova	

=== Senior gold medalists by apparatus ===
Senior Gold Medalists
Year	Rope	Hoop	Ball	Clubs	Ribbon
2001	Magdalena Markowska	Magdalena Markowska	Magdalena Markowska	Magdalena Markowska	not in competition
2002					not in competition
2003	not in competition	Magdalena Markowska	Joanna Mitrosz	Magdalena Markowska	Magdalena Markowska
2004	not in competition	Magdalena Markowska	Magdalena Markowska	Joanna Mitrosz	Magdalena Markowska
2005	Magdalena Markowska	not in competition	Magdalena Markowska	Joanna Mitrosz	Anna Zdun
2006	Joanna Mitrosz	not in competition	Anna Zdun	Joanna Mitrosz	Joanna Mitrosz
2007	Joanna Mitrosz	Joanna Mitrosz	not in competition	Joanna Mitrosz	Joanna Mitrosz
2008	Joanna Mitrosz	Marta Koczkowska	not in competition	Joanna Mitrosz	Joanna Mitrosz
2009	Joanna Mitrosz	Joanna Mitrosz	Joanna Mitrosz	not in competition	Joanna Mitrosz
2010	Joanna Mitrosz	Joanna Mitrosz	Joanna Mitrosz	not in competition	Joanna Mitrosz
2011	not in competition	Joanna Mitrosz	Joanna Mitrosz	Joanna Mitrosz	Joanna Mitrosz
2012	not in competition	Joanna Mitrosz	Joanna Mitrosz	Anna Czarniecka	Joanna Mitrosz
2013	not in competition	Anna Czarniecka	Anna Czarniecka	Anna Czarniecka	Anna Czarniecka
2014	not in competition	Anna Czarniecka	Anna Czarniecka	Anna Czarniecka	Anna Czarniecka
2017	not in competition	Natalia Koziol	Natalia Koziol	Malgorzata Romaniuk	Natalia Koziol
2018	not in competition	Małgorzata Romaniuk	Natalia Koziol	Natalia Koziol	Natalia Wiśniewska
2025	not in competition	Liliana Lewińska	Emilia Heichel	Liliana Lewińska	Emilia Heichel
2026	not in competition	Emilia Heichel	Liliana Lewińska	Liliana Lewińska	Liliana Lewińska

=== Senior gold medalists in group all-around ===
Senior Gold Medalists in Group All-Around
Year	Location	Gold	Silver	Bronze	Details
2001	unknown	Legia Warsaw	unknown	unknown	
2002	unknown	SGA Gdynia	unknown	unknown	
2003	unknown	UKS Jantar Gdynia	unknown	unknown	
2004	unknown	MKS Kusy Szczecin	unknown	unknown	
2005	unknown	MKS Kusy Szczecin	unknown	unknown	
2006	unknown	MKS Kusy Szczecin	unknown	unknown	
2007	unknown	UKS Jantar Gdynia	unknown	unknown	
2008	unknown	UKS Jantar Gdynia	unknown	unknown	
2009	unknown	UKS Jantar Gdynia	unknown	unknown	
2010	Łódź	MKS Kusy Szczecin	unknown	unknown	
2011	Łódź	UKS Kopernik Wrocław	unknown	unknown	
2012	Dziwnów	UKS Kopernik Wrocław	unknown	unknown	
2013	Wieliczka	SGA Gdynia	unknown	unknown	
2014	Dziwnów	UKS Jantar Gdynia	unknown	unknown	
2015	Łódź	unknown	unknown	unknown	
2016	unknown				

== Sources ==
- Polish Gymnastics Association Official Homepage
