= Pola Gałązka =

Polish rhythmic gymnast

- Born: 22 June 2010 (age 16) Warsaw

Gymnastics career
- Discipline: Rhythmic gymnastics
- Country represented: Poland (2022-present)
- Club: UKS PM Syrena
- Head coach: Inga Buczyńska
Medal record
Rhythmic gymnastics
Representing Poland
Event	1st	2nd	3rd
FIG World Cup	0	1	1
Total	0	1	1

Pola Gałązka (born 22 June 2010) is a Polish rhythmic gymnast. She represents Poland in international competitions as a member of the national group.

== Career ==
In May 2021 Gałązka took 10th place among gymnasts born in 2010 at the Irina Cup. Later in the month she was 13th overall and won two silver medals at the Enea Cup. In June she was 16th at the National Youth Olympiad. In September she took 8th place at the Warsaw Championships. She then won bronze with ribbon at the Warsaw Youth Olympiad.

=== Junior ===
In September 2022 she was selected to be part of the junior group for the following year's World Championships. In March 2023 she made her group debut at the Gymnastik International in Schmiden. At the Aphrodite Cup Poland was 5th with 5 ropes and 8th with 5 balls. In May the group took 6th place overall and 7th with 54 balls at the European Championships in Baku. She was then selected for the 2nd Junior World Championships in Cluj-Napoca along Maria Aszklar, Sara Łakomczak, Pola Świętochowska, Melody Wasiewicz-Hanc and Ksenia Zhyzhych. There they were 18th in the All-Around and didn't qualify for the finals.

At the 2024 Gdynia Rhythmic Stars she took 12th place in the All-Around. In October she won bronze with clubs and gold in teams, with Kseniya Zhyzhych and Maria Aszklar, at the Polish Championships.

=== Senior ===
She became age eligible for senior competitions in 2026. In March she took 6th place in the Polish Championships. Later she was incorporated into the Polish senior group. In late May she was selected for the European Championships in Varna, where the group was 10th overall, 5th with 5 balls and 13th with 3 hoops & 4 clubs. In June she took part in the World Challenge Cup in Cluj-Napoca, winning silver with 3 hoops & 4 clubs and bronze with 5 balls.
