= Mach (surname) =

Mach (Czech and Slovak feminine: Machová) is a surname. In Czech, it originated as an abbreviated form of the given names Matěj, Martin, etc. Notable people with the surname include:

- Alexander Mach (1902–1980), Slovak politician
- Angelika Mach (born 1991), Polish long-distance runner
- Brice Mach (born 1986), French rugby union player
- Daniel Mach (born 1955), French politician
- David Mach (born 1956), Scottish artist
- Edmund von Mach (1870–1927), German-American writer and lecturer on art
- Ernst Mach (1838–1916), Czech-Austrian physicist and philosopher
- Gerard Mach (1926–2015), Polish sprinter
- Hana Machová (born 1979), Czech basketball player
- Jaroslav Mach (1887–?), Czech sport shooter
- Josef Mach (1909–1987), Czech actor, screenwriter and film director
- Ludwig Mach (1868–1951), Czech-Austrian medical doctor
- Marek Mach (activist) (born 2001), Slovak activist
- Marek Mach (footballer) (born 2000), Czech footballer
- Mateusz Mach (born 1997), Polish entrepreneur
- Milan Mach (born 1972), Czech sport shooter
- Pavel Mach (1886–?), Czech sport shooter
- Petr Mach (born 1975), Czech politician
- Petr Mach (footballer) (born 1985), Czech footballer
- Radek Mach (born 1984), Czech volleyball player
- Růžena Šlemrová (née Machová, 1886–1962), Czech actress
- Stefanie Mach, American politician
- Veronika Machová (born 1990), Czech beauty pageant contestant
- Wilhelm Mach (1916–1965), Polish writer and literary critic

== See also ==
- Mai (Chinese surname) (麥)
