= Liwia Krzyżanowska =

Polish rhythmic gymnast (born 2006)

Liwia Krzyzanowska
- Born: 21 February 2006 (age 20) Warsaw, Poland

Gymnastics career
- Discipline: Rhythmic gymnastics
- Country represented: Poland; (2019-)
- Club: KSGA Legion Warszawa
- Head coach: Inga Buczynska
Medal record
Rhythmic gymnastics
Representing Poland
Event	1st	2nd	3rd
FIG World Cup	0	1	4
Total	0	1	4

Liwia Krzyzanowska (born 21 February 2006) is a Polish rhythmic gymnast, member of the national group.

== Career ==
She debuted into major competitions at the 2019 Junior World Championships in Moscow along Julia Wojciechowska, Anna Rybalko, Julia Wierzba, Oliwia Motyka-Radlowska and Magdalena Szewczuk, placing 14th in the team competition, 11th in the group All-Around and 14th with 5 hoops.

In 2022 Julia entered the national senior group, she debuted at the World Cup in Athens, winning bronze in the All-Around and with 3 ribbons and 2 balls and silver with 5 hoops. In May the group participated in the stage in Portimão winning bronze in the All-Around and with 3 ribbons and 2 balls and silver with 5 hoops. In June Julia and the group travelled to Pesaro, being 12th in the All-Around. Ten days later she competed at the 2022 European Championships in Tel Aviv, where Poland was 9th in the All-Around, 8th in the 5 hoops final and 10th with 3 ribbons + 2 balls. In September Wojciechowska took part in the World Championships in Sofia along Milena Gorska, Julia Wojciechowska, Madoka Przybylska, Magdalena Szewczuk and the individual Małgorzata Roszatycka, taking 13th place in the All-Around, 10th with 5 hoops and 14th with 3 ribbons + 2 balls.
