= Wasik =

Wasik or Wąsik is a Polish surname. Notable people with the surname include:

- Agnieszka Wąsik, neurochemist
- Aleksandra Śląska, born Aleksandra Wąsik (1925–1989), Polish film actress
- Antoni Wąsik (1886–1956), Polish socialist and trade union activist
- Bill Wasik, American magazine editor
- Edmund Wąsik (1883–1946), Polish social and trade union activist, politician, railwayman, member of the Sejm in the Second Polish Republic
- Elżbieta Magdalena Wąsik (born 1961), Polish linguist
- Jarosław Wasik (born 1971), Polish singer-songwriter
- Maciej Wąsik (born 1969), Polish politician
- Ryszard Wasik (1931–2021), Polish politician and shipping captain
- Stanisław Wąsik (born 1940), Polish politician, member of the Sejm
- Stanisław Wąsik (1908–2004), Polish socialist and independence activist, served in the Polish Armed Forces, chairman of the Central Foreign Committee of the Polish Socialist Party
- Zdzisław Wąsik (born 1947), Polish linguist and semiotician

== See also ==
- Wasikowski
