= Wasikowski =

Wasikowski or Wąsikowski is a masculine Polish surname, its feminine counterpart is Wasikowska or Wąsikowska. Notable people with the surname include:

- Gustaw Wąsikowski (1906–1942), Polish lieutenant of sappers of the Polish Army, knight of the Order of Virtuti Militari, victim of Nazi German Auschwitz concentration camp
- Mark Wasikowski, (born 1971) American college baseball coach
- Mia Wasikowska (born 1989), Australian actress

== See also ==
- Wosikowski
- Wasik or Wąsik
- Wasiewicz or Wąsiewicz
- Waskowski or Waśkowski
