= Vesna Pietrzak =

Polish rhythmic gymnast

- Born: 14 March 2009 (age 17) Warsaw

Gymnastics career
- Discipline: Rhythmic gymnastics
- Country represented: Poland; (2025-present)
- Head coach: Inga Buczyńska
Medal record
Rhythmic gymnastics
Representing Poland
Event	1st	2nd	3rd
FIG World Cup	2	6	3
Total	2	6	3

Vesna Pietrzak (born 14 March 2009) is a Polish rhythmic gymnast. She represents Poland in international competitions as a member of the national group.

== Biography ==
Pietrzak became age eligible for senior competitions in 2025, being incorporated into the Polish senior group. She made her debut at the World Cup in Sofia, winning bronze in the All-Around and with 5 ribbons with her group mates. In Tashkent they won gold in the All-Around and with 3 balls & 2 hoops as well as silver with 5 ribbons. In June she participated in the European Championships in Tallinn, finishing 7th overall and in the 5 ribbons final. The following month she won silver with 5 ribbons at the World Cup in Milan. A week later they won all three silver medals at the stage in Cluj-Napoca. In August, she competed at the 2025 World Championships in Rio de Janeiro, alongside Maria Aszklar, Madoka Przybylska, Magdalena Szewczuk, Melody Wasiewicz-Hanc and Julia Wojciechowska. They were 8th in All-Around, 7th with 5 ribbons and 8th with 3 balls & 2 hoops.

In 2026, she was selected for the European Championships in Varna, where the group was 10th in all-around, 5th with 5 balls and 13th with 3 hoops & 4 clubs. In June, she took part in the World Challenge Cup in Cluj-Napoca, winning silver with 3 hoops & 4 clubs and bronze with 5 balls.
