= Mariia Balakina =

Polish rhythmic gymnast (born 2006)

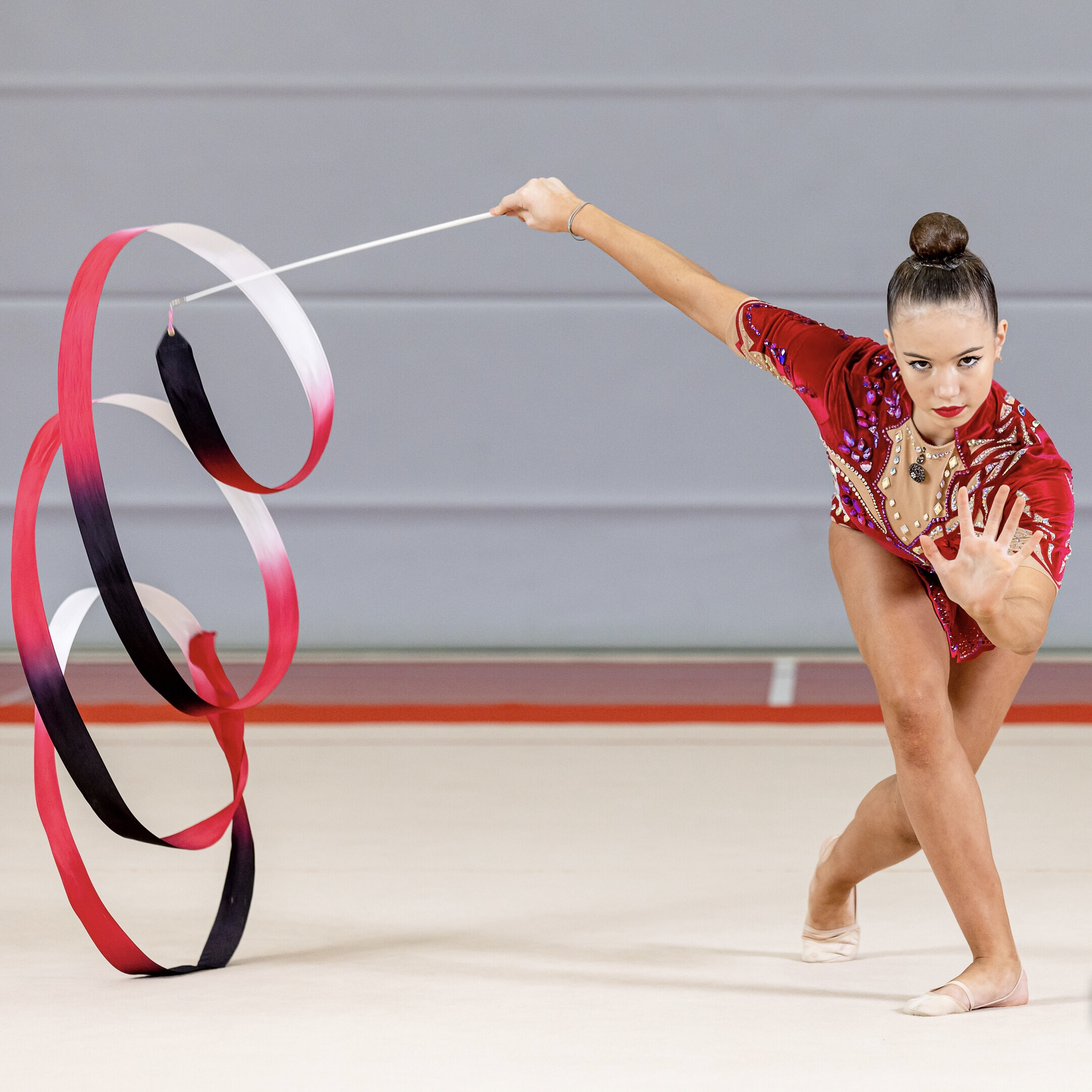
- Balakina in 2024

Personal information
- Born: 25 March 2006 (age 20) Lutsk, Ukraine

Gymnastics career
- Discipline: Rhythmic gymnastics
- Country represented: Poland; (2021-2024)
- Club: Akademia Leszka Blanika Warszawa
- Head coach: Inga Buczyńska
- Assistant coaches: Olga Balakina, Adriana Szymańska
Medal record
Rhythmic gymnastics
Representing Poland
Event	1st	2nd	3rd
FIG World Cup	1	2	5
Total	1	2	5

Mariia Balakina (born 25 March 2006) is a Polish rhythmic gymnast. As a member of the senior group she won medals at World Cups and reached the finals of the European Championships three times.

== Career ==
=== Junior ===
Mariia debuted internationally in 2021 when she competed with the national junior group at the European Championships in Varna, finishing 8th in the All-Around, 9th with 5 balls and 8th with 5 ribbons.

=== Senior ===
In 2022, as a member of the senior group, she competed at the World Cup in Athens, winning bronze in the All-Around and with 3 ribbons and 2 balls and silver with 5 hoops. In May the group participated in the stage in Portimão winning bronze in the All-Around and with 3 ribbons and 2 balls and silver with 5 hoops. In June she and the group travelled to Pesaro, being 12th in the All-Around. Ten days later she competed at the 2022 European Championships in Tel Aviv, where Poland was 9th in the All-Around, 8th in the 5 hoops final and 10th with 3 ribbons + 2 balls.

In March 2024 she won gold with 3 ribbons and 2 balls at the World Cup in Athens along Milena Górska, Madoka Przybylska, Malgorzata Roszatycka and Julia Wojciechowska. Two weeks later the group won bronze in the same event in Sofia. In May, she and her group (Madoka Przybylska, Małgorzata Roszatycka, Julia Wojciechowska, Magdalena Szewczuk, Milena Górska) competed at the 2024 European Championships in Budapest, Hungary. They took 8th place in all-around and 5th place in 3 Ribbons + 2 Balls.
