= Melody Wasiewicz-Hanc =

Polish rhythmic gymnast

- Born: 20 April 2008 (age 18) Warsaw, Poland

Gymnastics career
- Discipline: Rhythmic gymnastics
- Country represented: Poland; (2022-present)
- Club: UKS Akademia Leszka Blanika
- Head coach: Inga Buczyńska
Medal record
Rhythmic gymnastics
Representing Poland
Event	1st	2nd	3rd
FIG World Cup	2	6	3
Total	2	6	3

Melody Wasiewicz-Hanc (born 20 April 2008) is a Polish rhythmic gymnast. She represents Poland in international competitions as a member of the national group.

== Biography ==
=== Junior ===
In September 2022, Wasiewicz-Hanc was selected to be part of the junior group for the following year's World Championships.

In March 2023, she made her group debut at the Gymnastik International in Schmiden. At the Aphrodite Cup Poland was 5th with 5 ropes and 8th with 5 balls. A month later the group took part in the AGF Trophy in Baku, being 6th in teams, 5th with 5 balls and won bronze with 5 ropes. In May the group took 6th place overall and 7th with 5 balls at the European Championships in Baku, Azerbaijan. She was then selected for the 2nd Junior World Championships in Cluj-Napoca, Romania, alongside Pola Gałązka, Sara Łakomczak, Pola Świętochowska, Maria Aszklar and Kseniya Zhyzhych. There they were 18th in the All-Around and didn't qualify for the finals. In December she won silver in teams at the Polish Championships along Kseniya Zhyzhych and Maria Aszklar.

=== Senior ===
She became age eligible for senior competitions in 2024. In May she took part in the Gdynia Rhythmic Stars she retired from the competition after competing with ball. At nationals she took 5th place overall.

In 2025, she was incorporated into the Polish senior group. She made her World Cup debut at the World Cup in Sofia, winning bronze in the All-Around and with 5 ribbons with her teammates. In Tashkent they won gold in the All-Around and with 3 balls & 2 hoops as well as silver with 5 ribbons. Competing at the Gdynia Rhythmic Stars the group won the All-Around. In June, she participated in the European Championships in Tallinn, finishing 7th in all-around and in 5 ribbons final. The following month she won silver with 5 ribbons at the World Cup in Milan. A week later they won all three silver medals at the stage in Cluj-Napoca. In August, she competed at the 2025 World Championships in Rio de Janeiro, Brazil, alongside Vesna Pietrzak, Madoka Przybylska, Magdalena Szewczuk, Maria Aszklar and Julia Wojciechowska. They were 8th in All-Around, 7th with 5 ribbons and 8th with 3 balls & 2 hoops.

In January 2026 she was among the candidates for the award of best athlete from Warsaw. In May she was selected for the European Championships in Varna, Bulgaria, where the group was 10th in all-around, 5th with 5 balls and 13th with 3 hoops + 4 clubs. In June, she took part in the World Challenge Cup in Cluj-Napoca, winning silver with 3 hoops & 4 clubs and bronze with 5 balls. In July, she and her group took 18th place in all-around at Milan World Cup, and did not advance into any apparatus finals.
