= Alicja Dobrołęcka =

Polish Rhythmic Gymnast

- Born: 23 May 2003 (age 23) Warsaw, Poland

Gymnastics career
- Discipline: Rhythmic gymnastics
- Country represented: Poland (2017-2022)
- Club: KS SG Legion Warszawa
- Head coach: Anna Mrozinska

Alicja Dobrołęcka (born 23 May 2003) is a Polish rhythmic gymnast. She represents Poland in international competitions.

== Career ==
She entered the national team in 2017 when she was part of the junior group. In March they won bronze at the Baltic Hoop tournament in Riga. Then they took part in the European Championships in Budapest ending the All-Around in 11th place along Wiktoria Mielec, Kornelia Pacholec, Małgorzata Roszatycka, Milena Górska and Natalia Wiśniewska.

In 2018 she was selected, as an individual, for the European Championships in Guadalajara. There she was 10th in the All-Around, 21st with hoop, 33rd with ball, 31st with clubs and 20th with ribbon. At the Polish Championships she won gold overall and with ball as well as silver with hoop and clubs.

She became age eligible for senior competitions in 2019, being integrated in the senior group participating in the 2019 World Championships in Baku (with Julia Chochol, Milena Górska, Aleksandra Majewska and Aleksandra Wlazlak), finishing 18th in the All-Around, 15th with 5 balls and 17th with 3 hoops and 4 clubs.

In 2020 she switched again to being an individual and in December she became the Polish national champion in the All-Around and in all apparatus finals. In May 2022 she competed in the Portimão International Tournament, being 7th in the All-Around, 21st with hoop, 8th with ball, 8th with clubs and 12th with ribbon.
