= Dorota Trafankowska =

Polish gymnast

- Born: 28 July 1953 (age 73) Poznań, Poland

Gymnastics career
- Discipline: Rhythmic gymnastics
- Country represented: Poland
- Club: Energetic
- Head coach: Vanda Skrzydlevskaya
- Retired: yes

Dorota Trafankowska (born 28 July 1953) is a Polish retired rhythmic gymnast. She was the national champion in 1971.

== Career ==
Trafankowska was born in Poznań. She was a pupil of the Poznań rhythmic gymnastics school founded by Vanda Skrzydlevskaya in 1963. In the 1970s and 1980s it was the best gymnastics school in the country, and its representatives won the national championships in most years. At the 1969 World Championships in Varna, Travankovskaya took the 28th place in the individual all-around. In 1971, now representing the club "Energetic" from Poznań, Trafankowska won the Polish Championships. She also starred in the video "Her Portrait" (Polish: Jej portret) by Bogusław Mec, one of the most popular performers of the country at that time. After her retirement, she married and now lives in the United States.
