= Joanna Mitrosz =

Polish rhythmic gymnast (born 1988)

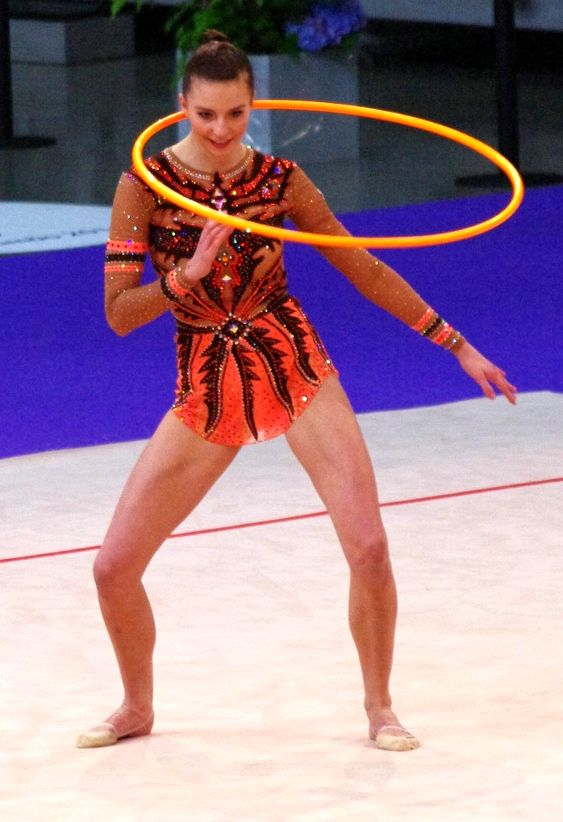

Personal information
- Nickname: Asia
- Born: 21 August 1988 (age 38) Gdynia
- Height: 1.81 m (5 ft 11 in)

Gymnastics career
- Discipline: Rhythmic gymnastics
- Country represented: Poland
- Club: UKS Jantar Gdynia
- Head coach: Alicja Urbaniak
- Retired: 2013
Medal record
Representing Poland
Rhythmic Gymnastics
Grand Prix Final
Bronze medal – third place	2008 Bratislava	Hoop

Joanna Mitrosz-Cieślak (née Mitrosz; born 21 August 1988 in Gdynia, Poland), is a retired Polish rhythmic gymnast. She competed at two Olympics (2008, 2012) and is a seven-time consecutive Polish national champion (2006-2012).

== Career ==
Mitrosz began gymnastics after her father saw an ad in the newspaper. Her first World Championships were the 2003 World Championships, where she qualified for the all-around final and finished in 28th place. She became Polish national champion for the first time in 2006 and continued to win the title every year for the rest of her career.

She competed at the 2008 Summer Olympics and placed 16th in the qualifications; she did not advance into the finals.

Mitrosz broke into the top 10 at the World and European level in 2009; she placed 10th at both the 2009 European Championships and the 2009 World Championships. She had her highest World Championships placement in 2011, where she finished 8th in the all-around.

In 2012, she competed on the World Cup circuit, and she finished 4th at the stage in Kyiv, which was the best of her career, and 8th at the stage in Pesaro. At the 2012 European Championships, she placed 7th.

In August, she competed at the 2012 Summer Olympics, where she reached the final and finished in 9th place.

Mitrosz won the 2012 Dziennik Bałtycki Athlete of the Year award. She announced that she had completed her career in early 2013, saying that although there were gymnasts older than her still competing, she did not think it would be good for her health to do so and she wanted to live with more privacy. She gave a farewell performance that March.

== Personal life ==
Mitrosz married in late 2012.

Her favorite apparatus to perform with was the ribbon.

== Achievements ==
- First Polish gymnast to win a medal at the Grand Prix Final, a bronze in hoop.

== Detailed Olympic results ==
Year	Competition Description	Location	Music	Apparatus	Rank	Score-Final	Rank	Score-Qualifying
2012	Olympics	London		All-around	9th	108.900	8th	109.750
2012	Olympics	London	My Cyganie	Ribbon	8th	27.425	7th	27.450
2012	Olympics	London	Perhaps Perhaps Perhaps by Pussycat Dolls	Ball	6th	27.150	8th	27.250
2012	Olympics	London	Tanguera by Sexteto Mayor	Hoop	7th	27.475	9th	27.425
2012	Olympics	London	Sing Sing Sing by Benny Goodman	Clubs	8th	26.850	6th	27.625
