= Madoka Przybylska =

Polish rhythmic gymnast (born 2006)

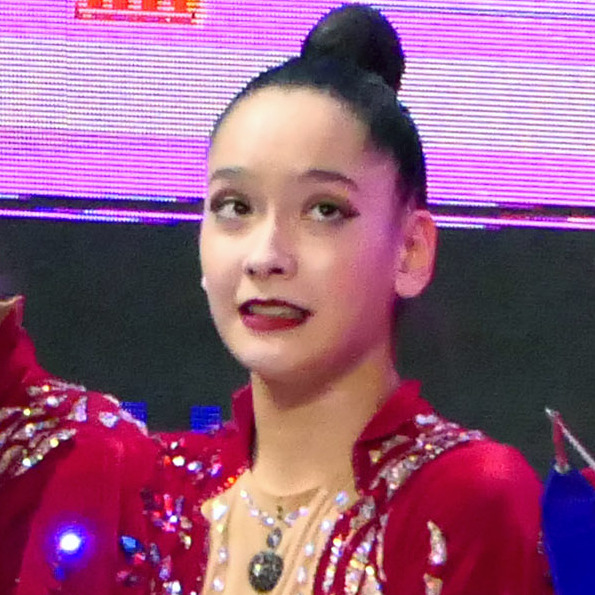
- Przybylska in 2024

Personal information
- Born: 2 June 2006 (age 20) Warsaw, Poland

Gymnastics career
- Discipline: Rhythmic gymnastics
- Country represented: Poland (2019-)
- Club: KSGA Legion Warszawa
- Head coach: Inga Buczyńska
Medal record
Rhythmic gymnastics
Representing Poland
Event	1st	2nd	3rd
FIG World Cup	3	6	8
Total	3	6	8

Madoka Przybylska (born 2 June 2006) is a Polish rhythmic gymnast and member of the national group.

== Personal life ==
She speaks Polish and Japanese, because her mother is Japanese. She has a twin sister named Midori, who also competed in rhythmic gymnastics on the junior national level in Poland.

== Career ==
Madoka took up rhythmic gymnastics at age 6 at the club UKS Irina Warszawa.

In 2022 she entered the national senior group and debuted at the World Cup in Athens, winning bronze in the All-Around, with 3 ribbons, 2 balls, and silver with 5 hoops. In May, the group participated in the stage in Portimão winning bronze in the All-Around with 3 ribbons, 2 ballsm, and silver with 5 hoops. In June Madoka and the group travelled to Pesaro, placing 12th in the All-Around. Ten days later she competed at the 2022 European Championships in Tel Aviv, where Poland was 9th in the All-Around, 8th in the 5 hoops final, and 10th with 3 ribbons + 2 balls. In September Przybylska took part in the World Championships in Sofia along Milena Górska, Liwia Krzyżanowska, Julia Wojciechowska, Magdalena Szewczuk and the individual Małgorzata Roszatycka, taking 13th place in the All-Around, 10th with 5 hoops and 14th with 3 ribbons + 2 balls.

In 2023, at the first World Cup of the season in Athens, the group was 6th in the All-Around, 4th with 3 ribbons + 2 balls, and won bronze with 5 hoops. In Sofia, the group was 5th in the All-Around and won an unprecedented gold medal in the 3 ribbons + 2 balls final. At the 2023 World Championships in Valencia, Spain, they placed 10th in group all-around, failing to get an Olympic quota. They qualified to 5 Hoops final, finishing 6th.

In March 2024 she won a gold medal with 3 ribbons and 2 balls at the World Cup in Athens. Two weeks later the group won bronze in the same event in Sofia. In May, she and her group (Mariia Balakina, Małgorzata Roszatycka, Julia Wojciechowska, Magdalena Szewczuk, Milena Górska) competed at the 2024 European Championships in Budapest, Hungary. They took 8th place in all-around and 5th place in 3 Ribbons + 2 Balls.

In 2025, she continued competing in a group despite some members retiring. On April 4-6, she and Maria Aszklar, Vesna Pietrzak, Magdalena Szewczuk, Melody Wasiewicz-Hanc and Julia Wojciechowska won bronze medal in the group all-around and 5 ribbons at the Sofia World Cup. On April 25-27, they won gold medals in all-around and 3 Balls + 2 Hoops, and silver in 5 Ribbons at the Tashkent World Cup. She and her teammates represented Poland at the 2025 European Championships in Tallinn, Estonia. They took 7th place in all-around and qualified for the 5 Ribbons final, where they finished in 7th place due to many mistakes in composition. In July, they won another silver medal in the 5 Ribbons final at the Milan World Cup. On July 25-27, they won three silver medals at the Cluj-Napoca World Challenge Cup.
