= Wasiewicz =

Wasiewicz or Wąsiewicz is a Polish surname. Archaic feminine forms are Wasiewiczowa or Wąsiewiczowa (by husband), Wasiewiczówna or Wąsiewiczówna (by father); they still can be used colloquially. It may be also transliterated as Wonsiewicz. Notable people with this surname include:

- Eugeniusz Wąsiewicz (1933–2001), Polish professor, doctor of medical sciences, surgeon
- Jan Wasiewicz (1911–1976), Polish footballer
- Melody Wasiewicz-Hanc (born 2008), Polish rhythmic gymnast
- Władysław Wasiewicz (1880–1971), Polish sculptor, graphic artist and teacher

== See also ==
- Waszkiewicz
