= Reinhold Curicke =

German jurist and historian

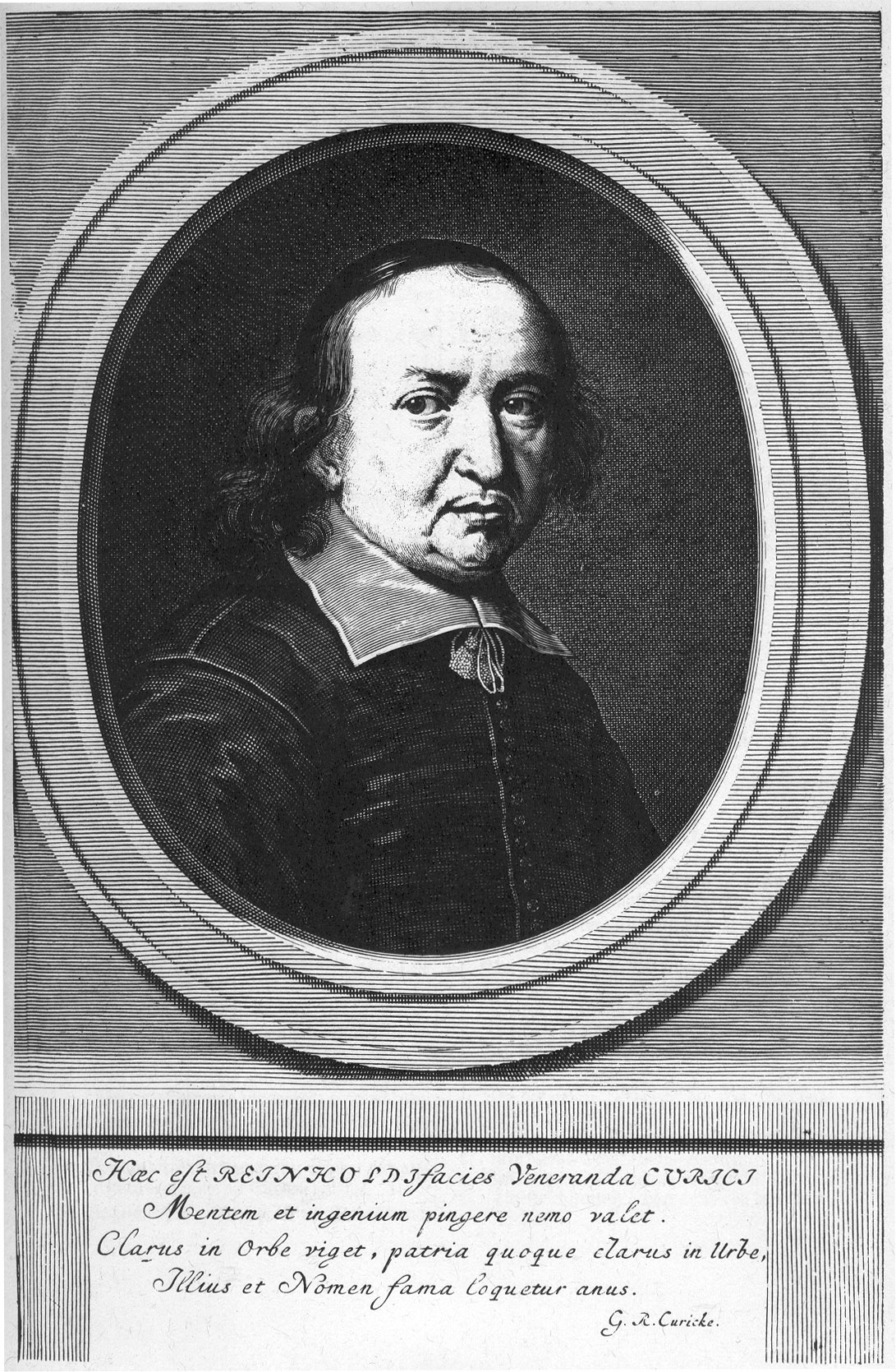
Reinhold Curicke.

Reinhold Curicke (12 January 1610 – 2 April 1667) was a jurist and historian from Danzig (Gdańsk) who specialized in the history of the city and its connections with Hanseatic merchant organization.

In 1645, Curicke published a German language four-volume work: Der Stadt Danzig historische Beschreibung .... This historical description of Danzig was the first monograph about the city. It covers the origins of the city, its government, wars and religious history.

His son, Georg Reinhold Curicke, commissioned a posthumous publication with copper etchings to illustrate the history were printed in 1687 in Danzig and Amsterdam.

== Works ==
- Secretarius Reinhold Curicke: Der Stadt Dantzig historische Beschreibung, worinnen von dero Uhrsprung Situation Regiments-Art geführten Kriegen Religions- und Kirchen-Wesen außführlich gehandelt wird. Verfasset u. zusammengetragen durch Curicke i. J. 1645. (original edition)
- ... Anitzo aber mit sonderbahren Fleiss, nebst vielen dazu gehörigen Kupferstücken in öffentlichen Druck aufgegeben von G. Reinhold Curicken, 1686. (posthumous edition with copper etchings)
- ... Und mit vielen newen Additionibus vermehrt und continuiert biß auff die gegenwertige Zeit. Johan und Gillis Janssons von Waesberge, 1688, Amsterdam/Dantzig (updated and expanded edition, reprinted by Paul Rosenberg, Danziger Verlagsgesellschaft, Klausdorf bei Kiel, 1987)

== See also ==
- List of people from Danzig
