= Magdalena Szewczuk =

Polish rhythmic gymnast (born 2006)

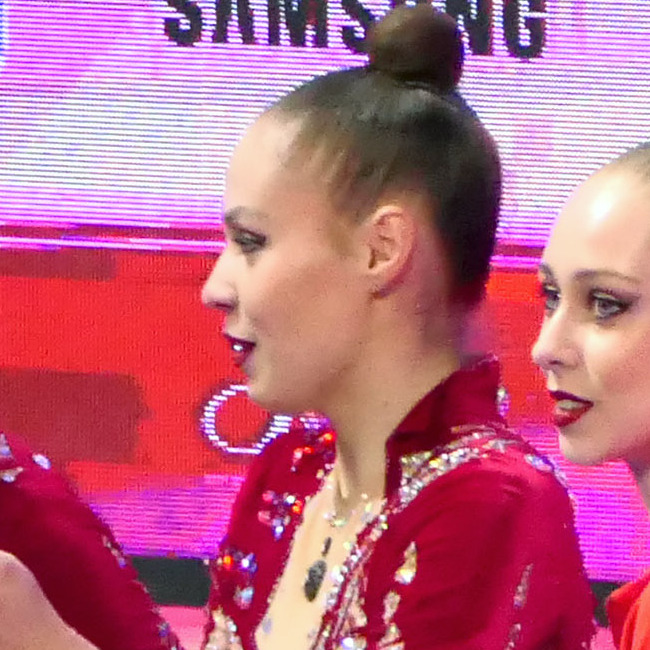
- Szewczuk in 2024

Personal information
- Born: 13 April 2006 (age 20) Warsaw, Poland

Gymnastics career
- Discipline: Rhythmic gymnastics
- Country represented: Poland (2019-2025)
- Club: KSGA Legion Warszawa
- Head coach: Inga Buczyńska
Medal record
Rhythmic gymnastics
Representing Poland
Event	1st	2nd	3rd
FIG World Cup	2	1	6
Total	2	1	6

Magdalena Szewczuk (born 13 April 2006) is a Polish rhythmic gymnast, former member of the national group.

== Career ==
=== Junior ===
She debuted into major competitions at the 2019 Junior World Championships in Moscow, Russia, along Liwia Krzyzanowska, Anna Rybalko, Julia Wierzba, Oliwia Motyka-Radlowska and Julia Wojciechowska, placing 14th in the team competition, 11th in the group All-Around and 14th with 5 hoops.

=== Senior ===
In 2022, Magdalena entered the national senior group, she debuted at the World Cup in Athens, winning bronze in the All-Around and with 3 ribbons and 2 balls and silver with 5 hoops. In May the group participated in the stage in Portimão winning bronze in the All-Around and with 3 ribbons and 2 balls and silver with 5 hoops. In June Magdalena and the group travelled to Pesaro, being 12th in the All-Around. Ten days later she competed at the 2022 European Championships in Tel Aviv, where Poland was 9th in the All-Around, 8th in the 5 hoops final and 10th with 3 ribbons + 2 balls. In September Szewczuk took part in the World Championships in Sofia along Milena Górska, Liwia Krzyżanowska, Madoka Przybylska, Julia Wojciechowska and the individual Małgorzata Roszatycka, taking 13th place in the All-Around, 10th with 5 hoops and 14th with 3 ribbons + 2 balls.

In 2023, at the first World Cup of the season in Athens the group was 6th in the All-Around, 4th with 3 ribbons + 2 balls and won bronze 5 hoops. In Sofia the group was 5th in the All-Around and won an unprecedented gold medal in the 3 ribbons + 2 balls' final.

In March 2024 she won gold with 3 ribbons and 2 balls at the World Cup in Athens. Two weeks later the group won bronze in the same event in Sofia. At the 2023 World Championships in Valencia, Spain, they placed 10th in group all-around, failing to get an Olympic quota. They qualified to 5 Hoops final, finishing 6th.

In March 2024 she won gold medal with 3 ribbons and 2 balls at the World Cup in Athens. Two weeks later the group won bronze in the same event in Sofia. In May, she and her group (Mariia Balakina, Małgorzata Roszatycka, Julia Wojciechowska, Madoka Przybylska, Milena Górska) competed at the 2024 European Championships in Budapest, Hungary. They took 8th place in all-around and 5th place in 3 Ribbons + 2 Balls.

In 2025, she continued competing in a group despite some members retiring. On April 4-6, she and Maria Aszklar, Vesna Pietrzak, Madoka Przybylska, Melody Wasiewicz-Hanc and Julia Wojciechowska won bronze medal in group all-around and 5 ribbons at Sofia World Cup. On April 25-27, they won gold medals in all-around and 3 Balls + 2 Hoops, and silver in 5 Ribbons at Tashkent World Cup. She and her teammates represented Poland at the 2025 European Championships in Tallinn, Estonia. They took 7th place in all-around and qualified to 5 Ribbons final, where they finished on 7th place due to many mistakes in composition. In July, they won another silver medal in 5 Ribbons final at Milan World Cup. On July 25-27, they won three silver medals at Cluj-Napoca World Challenge Cup.

On 8 January 2026, she announced her retirement via her Instagram profile.
