= Milan Mach =

Czech sport shooter (born 1972)

Milan Mach (born 17 February 1972 in Čeladná) is a Czech sport shooter. He competed at the 1996 Summer Olympics in the men's 50 metre rifle prone event, in which he placed fifth.
