= Milena Górska =

Polish rhythmic gymnast (born 2003)

Milena Gorska
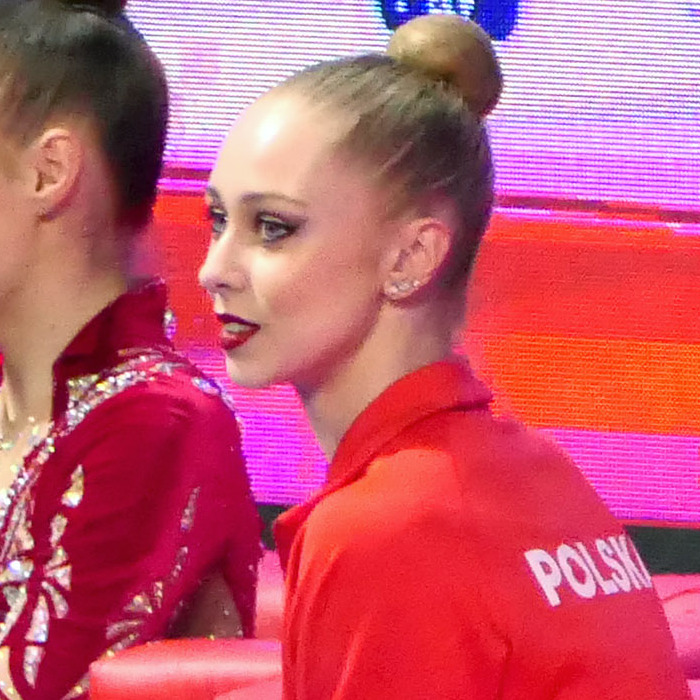
- Górska in 2024

Personal information
- Born: 11 January 2003 (age 23) Warsaw, Poland

Gymnastics career
- Discipline: Rhythmic gymnastics
- Country represented: Poland; (2019-)
- Club: KSGA Legion Warszawa
- Head coach: Inga Buczyńska
Medal record
Rhythmic gymnastics
Representing Poland
Event	1st	2nd	3rd
FIG World Cup	2	1	6
Total	2	1	6

Milena Gorska (born 11 January 2003) is a Polish rhythmic gymnast, member of the national group.

== Career ==
She entered the national team at 14 in 2017 when she was part of the junior group that took part in the European Championships in Budapest ending the All-Around in 11th place along Wiktoria Mielec, Kornelia Pacholec, Małgorzata Roszatycka, Alicja Dobrołęcka and Natalia Wiśniewska.

Two years later she was integrated in the senior group participating in the 2019 World Championships in Baku, finishing 18th in the All-Around, 15th with 5 balls and 17th with 3 hoops and 4 clubs. In 2021 she competed as an individual at two World Cup stages: Tashkent (40th in the All-Around, 46th with hoop, 37th with ball, 39th with clubs and 37th with ribbon) and Baku (47th in the All-Around, 40th with hoop, 46th with ball, 53rd with clubs and 43rd with ribbon).

Milena debuted in 2022, again as a member of the group, at the World Cup in Athens, winning bronze in the All-Around and with 3 ribbons and 2 balls and silver with 5 hoops. In May the group participated in the stage in Portimão winning bronze in the All-Around and with 3 ribbons and 2 balls and silver with 5 hoops. In June she and the group travelled to Pesaro, being 12th in the All-Around. Ten days later she competed at the 2022 European Championships in Tel Aviv, where Poland was 9th in the All-Around, 8th in the 5 hoops final and 10th with 3 ribbons + 2 balls. In September Gorska took part in the World Championships in Sofia along Julia Wojciechowska, Liwia Krzyzanowska, Madoka Przybylska, Magdalena Szewczuk and the individual Małgorzata Roszatycka, taking 13th place in the All-Around, 10th with 5 hoops and 14th with 3 ribbons + 2 balls.

In 2023 at the first World Cup of the season in Athens the group was 6th in the All-Around, 4th with 3 ribbons + 2 balls and won bronze 5 hoops. In Sofia the group was 5th in the All-Around and won an unprecedented gold medal in the 3 ribbons + 2 balls' final.

In March 2024 she won gold with 3 ribbons and 2 balls at the World Cup in Athens along Mariia Balakina, Madoka Przybylska, Malgorzata Roszatycka and Julia Wojciechowska. Two weeks later the group won bronze in the same event in Sofia.
