= Rachel Meyer =

German writer (1806–1874)

Rachel Meyer (Rahel Meyer and Rachel Weiss Meyer; 11 March 1806 – 8 February 1874) was a German writer.

Meyer was born in Danzig, 11 March 1806. A few years after the death of her sister Frederika, she married the latter's husband. While devoting herself to charity and teaching, she found time to entertain noted men and to continue her own self-education. The publication of her first book, written while superintending the instruction of her children, was delayed by the death of a son. It appeared in Berlin in 1853 under the title Zwei Sclnvestern, and dealt with the triumph of love over self and was an idealistic exposition of the marital relation. Her husband's business caused the family to move to Vienna; here Meyer met Leopold Kompert and Ludwig August von Frankl, and here she produced her sketch of Vienna life entitled Wider die Katur. Another work, entitled Rachel (Vienna, 1859), was a novel describing the life of the actress Rachel Félix. In Banden Frei (Berlin, 1869), her last novel, was a character study of her friend Lina Davidson. Meyer spent her last years in Berlin, with her daughters. Despite her idealism she was practical, and shortly before her death wrote a sketch of George Stephenson, the inventor, with the express purpose of fostering in her nephew the practical spirit. Meyer died in Berlin, 8 February 1874.
