= Mariola Grażyna Antczak =

Polish bibliologist

Mariola Antczak
- Born: 14 January 1970 (age 56); Gdańsk
- Citizenship: Polish
- Education: University of Łódź (Ph.D.) University of Silesia (DSc)
- Scientific career
- Fields: library science, information science, bibliology
- Institutions: University of Łódź
- Thesis: Rola bibliotek i bibliotekarzy szkolnych w edukacji społeczeństwa informacyjnego na tle przeobrażeń oświatowych w Polsce w latach 1989-2007 (2012)
- Website: Mariola Antczak

Mariola Grażyna Antczak (born Mariola Grażyna Birecka; 14 January 1970 in Gdańsk) is a Polish bibliologist and informatologist, associate professor and head of the Department of Information, Library and Book Studies at University of Łódź.

== Education ==
Mariola Antczak received an MA in library and information science at the Faculty of Philology of University of Łódź in 1994, Ph.D. in bibliology in 1999. Her Habilitation (D.Sc.) in library and information science was completed at the Faculty of Philology of the University of Silesia in 2012, the thesis title being Rola bibliotek i bibliotekarzy szkolnych w edukacji społeczeństwa informacyjnego na tle przeobrażeń oświatowych w Polsce w latach 1989-2007.

== Career and research ==
Since 2015, she serves as head of the Department of Information, Library and Book Studies at University of Łódź.

In 1994–2000, she worked as a teacher-librarian at Primary School No. 99 in Łódź and then, in 2000–2001, as a teacher-librarian at Junior High School No. 31 in Łódź. Her academic career started in 2001 when she became an assistant professor at the Department of Information, Library and Book Studies of the University of Łódź. Currently, Mariola Antczak is an associate professor there.

Antczak is a specialist in school libraries with particular emphasis on the didactic work of teacher-librarians and library organization and management. She is also interested in readership, media, and information education, as well as library marketing, information society, information literacy, reading culture of children and youth, libraries in Finland, and drama as a didactic method.

== Membership and service ==
- Polskie Towarzystwo Komunikacji Społecznej: Wrocław, dolnośląskie voivodeship, Poland; 2022 to present, since 25 February 2022 head of section "Book and information culture"
- Łódzkie Towarzystwo Naukowe: Łódź, łódzkie voivodeship, Poland; 2012 to present

== Awards and honours ==
Antczak received the "Librarian of the Year" award from the Polish School Librarian Association (1998), two awards from the president of the University of Łódź (2004, 2005), and a Voivodeship marshal award (2019).

== Selected publications ==
- Antczak, Mariola, Czapnik, Grzegorz, ed. (2022). Organizacja konferencji naukowych. Łódź: Wydawnictwo Uniwersytetu Łódzkiego. ISBN 978-83-822-0902-0.
- Antczak, Mariola, Wachowicz, Monika (2022). Assessment of the COVID-19 Pandemic Impact on the Changes in the Operation and Structure of Polish Voivodeship Pedagogical Libraries. Polish Libraries 10, page 201–226.
- Antczak, Mariola, Gruszka, Zbigniew (2022). Academic Library Research Development in the Context of if of Journals: Bibliometric Analysis of Articles Based on the Lista Database (2000-2019). Przegląd Biblioteczny 4, page 467–486.
- Antczak, Mariola, Gruszka, Zbigniew, ed. (2020). Interdyscyplinarium nauk o mediach i kulturze. Łódź: Wydawnictwo Uniwersytetu Łódzkiego. ISBN 978-83-8142-727-2.
- Antczak, Mariola, Gruszka, Zbigniew, Czapnik, Grzegorz, ed. (2020). Łódzkie biblioteki publiczne. Czas zmian, czas wyzwań. Łódź: Wydawnictwo Uniwersytetu Łódzkiego. ISBN 978-83-8142-668-8.
- Antczak, Mariola, Kalińska-Kula, Magdalena (2020). Biblioteczny marketing wewnętrzny w teorii i praktyce. Łódź: Wydawnictwo Uniwersytetu Łódzkiego. ISBN 978-83-8142-335-9.
- Antczak, Mariola (2019). Marketing biblioteczny. In: Zarządzanie biblioteką, Wojciechowska, Maja, ed., Warszawa: Wydawnictwo Naukowe i Edukacyjne SBP, page 521–540. ISBN 978-83-65741-26-4.
- Antczak, Mariola, Przybysz-Stawska, Magdalena, ed. (2018). Słownik członków ŁTN 2010-2015. Łódź: Wydawnictwo Uniwersytetu Łódzkiego, Wydawnictwo Łódzkiego Towarzystwa Naukowego. ISBN 978-83-8142-249-9.
- Antczak, Mariola (2016). Współczesne trendy w edukacji przyszłych nauczycieli bibliotekarzy na przykładzie Katedry Bibliotekoznawstwa i Informacji Naukowej Uniwersytetu Łódzkiego. Folia Librorum. Acta Universitatis Lodziensis 1–2, page 81–106.
- Antczak, Mariola, Walczak-Niewiadomska, Agata, ed. (2015). Biblioteki i książki w życiu nastolatków. Łódź, Warszawa: Wydawnictwo Uniwersytetu Łódzkiego, Wydawnictwo SBP. ISBN 978-83-64203-45-9.
- Antczak, Mariola, Walczak-Niewiadomska, Agata, ed. (2015). Książki w życiu najmłodszych. Łódź, Warszawa: Wydawnictwo Uniwersytetu Łódzkiego, Wydawnictwo SBP. ISBN 978-83-64203-47-3.
- Antczak, Mariola, Walczak-Niewiadomska, Agata, ed. (2015). W kręgu kultury czytelniczej dzieci i młodzieży. Łódź, Warszawa: Wydawnictwo Uniwersytetu Łódzkiego, Wydawnictwo SBP. ISBN 978-83-64203-46-6.
- Antczak, Mariola (2014). A comparison of selected aspects of Finnish and Polish public libraries. Folia Scandynavica Poznaniensia 16, page 114–130.
- Walczak-Niewiadomska, Agata, Brzuska-Kępa, Alina, Antczak, Mariola, ed. (2013). Media a czytelnicy. Studia o popularyzacji czytelnictwa i uczestnictwie kulturowym młodego pokolenia. Łódź: Wydawnictwo Uniwersytetu Łódzkiego. ISBN 978-83-7525-990-2.
- Antczak, Mariola (2010). Rola bibliotek i bibliotekarzy szkolnych w edukacji społeczeństwa informacyjnego na tle przeobrażeń oświatowych w Polsce w latach 1989-2007. Łódź: Wydawnictwo Uniwersytetu Łódzkiego. ISBN 978-83-7525-381-8.
- Antczak, Mariola (2010). Rola bibliotekarzy w nauczaniu umiejętności informacyjnych gimnazjalistów: wybrane zagadnienia. Przegląd Biblioteczny 78 (1), page 58–71.
- Antczak, Mariola (2010). Biblioteka szkolna a przygotowywanie uczniów do samokształcenia w świetle aktów legislacyjnych z lat 1945–1982. Folia Librorum 15, page 207–237.
- Antczak, Mariola (2004). Techniki dramy w teorii i praktyce nie tylko dla nauczycieli bibliotekarzy. Warszawa: "Sukurs". ISBN 978-83-904579-8-7.
