= Irene Wosikowski =

German political activist (1910–1944)

Judith Auer Irene Wosikowski (9 February 1910 – 27 October 1944) was a German political activist (KPD). After 1933 she continued with her (now illegal) political activity in Germany till 1935. The next two years were spent in Moscow after which, as instructed by the party, she moved to Paris, which had become one of two de facto capitals for the exiled German Communist Party. She worked on political education and publishing till 1940 when she was placed in the Gurs internment camp. After her escape she joined the Résistance. Living "underground" (unregistered) she remained at liberty till July 1943, despite the intensely dangerous nature of much of her resistance work, which included approaching German soldiers and engaging in "political" discussions to try to persuade them to face up to the accelerating savagery of the Shoah. Following her arrest Wosikowski was subjected to a sustained programme of torture and taken back to Germany, where she was executed at Plötzensee on the edge of Berlin.

== Life ==
=== Provenance and early years ===
Judith Auer Irene Wosikowski was born in Danzig (as Gdańsk was known at that time) and grew up in a politicised social-democratic household. Her mother later came to prominence as the politician and Hamburg parliamentarian Alice Wosikowski (1886–1949). Her father, the factory worker Wilhelm Wosikowski, was killed in October 1914 at the start the war, when she was four. The pension provided to the widows of fallen soldiers was meagre, and her mother struggled financially to support the young family. At one stage Irene's older brother Eberhard (born in 1908) was forced by the family's poverty temporarily to leave middle school. In 1911 Wilhelm Wosikowski had received an employment ban ("Berufsverbot") in Danzig on account of his trades union involvement and the family relocated to Kiel. In 1921 Alice Wosikowski married her dead husband's brother and the family moved again, this time to Hamburg.

=== Politics ===
Irene attended a "Handelsschule" (commercially oriented school) and on completion of the middle school stage took a job as a typist. After two years she moved on to work in an export agency. Her next job was with the Hamburg branch of the Soviet trade mission. She was sent in 1930 to work at the (implausibly large) Soviet trade mission in Berlin. She had been only 14 in 1924 when she joined the Young Communists: between 1926 and 1930 she was the "political leader" ("politische Leiterin") with the Young Communists' Hamburg group. 1930 was the year in which she joined the Communist Party. In 1932 she became a member of the party's AM-Apparat, which is generally identified as a cover name for the Communist Party's Intelligence Service.

=== National Socialist years and Moscow exile ===
The change of government in January 1933 was followed by a rapid transition to one-party dictatorship. During March 1933, irrespective of any residual legal niceties, the police and the courts began to operate on the basis that Communist Party membership was an act of treason. Irene Wosikowski became a member of the party's Berlin region leadership team ("Landesleitung"). During 1934 the authorities scheduled her arrest, but she was alerted in time to be able to escape to Czechoslovakia. There is a lack of precision in the sources over her movements during these months, but at some point in 1935 she moved to Moscow where in September of that year she was enrolled on a two-year course at the Comintern's International Lenin School. It was usual under these circumstances for comrades to be identified by pseudonyms. Irene Wosikowski's "party name" was "Helga Rühler".

=== Paris ===
At the end of 1937 the party sent Wosikowski to Paris where she worked as a typist and "political co-worker" in the editorial office of the "Deutsche Volks-Zeitung". That name had and has been revived many times. This version was a German-language weekly newspaper published by and for German speaking political exiles. In addition to he work in the editorial office, she was involved in the distribution of a publication intended for readers across Europe and in America. For a time she also worked as a close assistant to Franz Dahlem (who after 1945 would enjoy a long – though not uninterrupted – career as a senior national politician in the Soviet occupation zone (of Germany) and the German Democratic Republic.) The French government granted Wosikowski political asylum, but they did not provide a work permit, so she was desperately short of money. She did receive some support from the German League for Human Rights and from the Rothschild Committee, but the amounts involved were very small. During her time in Paris she lived with others refugees in cheap "migrant-hotels".

=== War ===
Although the French and British governments declared war in Germany following the German invasion of Poland at the start of September 1939, on the street of Paris there were no sudden changes, even after the Soviet Union invaded Poland from the other side two weeks later. On 10 May 1940 the Germany army invaded France, however, and this time the impact in Paris was immediate, especially for political exiles from Germany. All German women in France were ordered to report to the authorities on 13 May 1940. Irene Wosikowski was unable to comply with the requirement because she was arrested overnight on 12/13 May and taken to the Gurs internment camp to the south of Bordeaux. The German army overran northern France in approximately six weeks. Under the terms of the Franco-German armistice of 22 June 1940 the northern half of France was now to be placed under direct German control, while the southern half - defined at the time as the "free zone", was to be administered from Vichy by a puppet government to be led by a respected French war hero. Over the next couple of years the already limited autonomy of the Vichy government would be further diminished, but in 1940 it was significant that the internment camp was located not in the "occupied zone" but, along with the important cities of Toulouse, Lyon and Marseille, in the "free zone".

=== Internment ===
The Gurs internment camp had been set up at the end of the Spanish Civil War as a resettlement camp for escaping fighters from Spain. It had not been constructed as a "concentration camp". A committed sportswoman, Wosikowski organised other internees to become more physically active (whether they liked it or not). Two of her fellow internees, Luise Kraushaar and Thea Saefkow had, like her, been working for the party in Paris and in the camp the three of them teamed up. By the end of June 1940 Irene Wosikowski had escaped with her two comrades. Wosikowski now took the train for Marseille, intending to join up with the Résistance.

=== Marseille ===
On the train she was caught up in a check and arrested by a French policeman who presumably determined that her identity papers were not in order. She was held at Baumettes Prison, a Marseille penitemtiary reserved at that time for "dangerous" women, until January 1941. Following her release she was required to report regularly to the "Vichy" police. What she did not know was that at some stage the Reich Security Main Office had already placed her name, along with one of her cover names, "Erna", on the "manhunt targets lists" ("Sonderfahndungsliste") of government opponents to be sought out and rounded up following any successful German invasion of the Soviet Union. During the first part of 1941, using false identity papers, she joined with others to form a German resistance group in Marseille, still at this stage part of the "free zone" controlled from Vichy rather than Berlin. She shared an apartment with another German emigre called Thérèse Schmidt, and earned a small amount of money through dress-making. With other KPD members, such as Fritz Fugmann, Walter Janka and "Lex" Ende, she maintained contact with internees/prisoners still held in French internment camps, many of whom were veterans of the Spanish Civil War which had ended in defeat for the anti-fascists in 1939. She also helped organise the delivery of food parcels.

The nature of Irene Wosikowski's resistance work completely changed after November 1942. Probably as a response to the landing of large numbers of Anglo-American troops in North Africa, the Germans dusted off and implemented plans for a "direct military occupation of southern France. Marseille had till now been a principal transit point for refugees desperate to escape occupied Europe for reasons of race or politics, but now the escape channels dried up. Over the next few months German soldiers and Gestapo personnel became a common sight as military occupation took hold. Fluent German became a valuable asset, but the resistance activity involved in what was known as "enlightenment work" ("Aufklärungsarbeit") among the German soldiers was massively dangerous. At its simplest it involved distributing copies of the innocuously titled newspaper "Soldat am Mittelmeer" ("Soldier on the Mediterranean") to German military personnel, possibly by leaving copies on tables outside cafés where off-duty soldiers liked to gather. The newspaper comprised antifascist propaganda designed, with varying degrees of subtlety, to persuade German soldiers to lay down their arms.

Shortly after the German occupation Irene Wosikowski relocated (illegally) to a different part of the city and using forged papers took on a couple of new identities, as "Marie-Louise Durand" and "Poulette Monier". She teamed up with her comrade Thea Saefkow, and the two of them took to engaging in casual conversation with off-duty German soldiers. They would discuss the course of the war and, where appropriate, hand out (illegal) pamphlets, always trying to convince the men of the war's senselessness. During the course of this activity, in or shortly before July 1943, Wosikowski, found herself chatting with a German sailor called Hermann Frischalowski from Cuxhaven. He seemed genuinely persuaded by her arguments for quitting the army. After a period of caution, she came to believe in his stated anti-Hitler beliefs, but it turned out that quite soon after they first met he had denounced her to the Gestapo.

=== Arrest and "questioning" ===
After that "Paulette Monier" (being the name she was using) met up with Frischalowski a few more times. He asked her to obtain false identity documents and civilian clothes for him. Then, on 26 July 1943, he facilitated her arrest by the Gestapo. In the words of a note made by the security police on 27 July 1943, "on the basis of the denunciation by the sailor Hermann Frischalowski, the arrest of the German emigrant Irene Wosikowski took place in Marseille on 26 July 1943". (Note: "Aufgrund der Denunziation des Matrosen Hermann Frischalowski erfolgte am 26.7.1943 die Verhaftung der deutschen Emigrantin Irene Wosikowski in Marseille.".) Only after "intensified interrogation" did she disclose her real identity. Later, after long days of torture, she confirmed her own identity and that she had spent time training in Moscow. But still, despite brutal torture at the Gestapo main office in Marseille, she never disclosed the names of those comrades with whom she was working.

=== Final months ===
In the Fall/Autumn of 1943 she was transferred to Fresnes Prison, on the edge of Paris, where further unsuccessful attempts were made to induce her to disclose the identities of her Résistance co-activists. On 30 October 1943 she was transferred to the prison at Hamburg-Fuhlsbüttel. Here the interrogation under torture continued, but Wosikowski still refused to betray resistance comrades. A Gestapo report dated 5 April 1944 states: "...as far as Marseille is concerned, she [still] has not told us the whole truth. It is impossible to image that the accused, who must be viewed as a cadre member, schooled in the methods and modalities of the Communist Party, really has no understanding of the organisation to which she belongs. From that it can be deduced that she is a hardened militant who wants to protect her comrades and conceal their activities". The previous month Irene's mother Alice Wosikowski, who herself had several years as an inmate of a succession of concentration camps behind her, received notification from her daughter that she was back in Hamburg and the Gestapo had agreed visiting rights. Mother and daughter were permitted a brief discussion in the "Civil Justice Building" at the Hamburg Justice Complex. Alice Wosikowski later recalled her daughter's words: "Mother, if they tell you I have made a confession, do not believe it. I remain true to our cause". One of her interrogators in Hamburg was a man called "Kriminalsekretär" Heinrich Teege. Teege took advantage of her mother's visit to make an offer to Alice Wosikowski. She could save her daughter's life if she would work for the Gestapo. Alice Wosikowski refused. Irene Wosikowski took her leave of fellow prisoner on 20 April 1944 and was taken away for judicial investigatory detention and trial, first, on 22 May 1944, before a tribunal in Hamburg and then on 9 June 1944 to the women's prison in Cottbus.

Finally Irene Wosikowski was moved to the Barnimstrasse women's prison in Berlin. The charge was the conventional one of "preparing to commit high treason" ("Vorbereitung zum Hochverrat"). As was usual with "political" trials, the case was heard at the special "People's Court". On 13 September 1944 the verdict and sentence were delivered by the court president Roland Freisler in person: "Irene Wosikowski, an incorrigible communist for almost twenty years, underground militant in Berlin since the start of the National Socialist order. Emigrant, pupil of the Lenin School in Moscow, which sent her to Paris, from where she hounded the [German] state with communist organisations till the start of the war. In 1943 she tried to distribute communist propaganda to German soldiers in Marseilles. Thereby she made herself guilty of treason on behalf of our enemies and dishonoured herself in perpetuity ... Through her secret work in Paris she committed a heavy treason against the German people. For the purity of the German people and also to ensure our victory against the clandestine currents of defeatism, she must be condemned to death".

On 13 September 1944 Irene Wosikowski became the one hundred and eighty-fifth of the two-hundred and forty-one women executed at the Plötzensee Prison. She was thirty-four years old when she was beheaded.

=== Afterwards ===
Court president Roland Freisler was killed less than five months after delivering his sentence against Wosikowski when a US bomber scored a direct hit on his court building in a daytime bombing raid.

On 13 January 1948 Alice Wosikowski lodged a charge against the sailor at the district court in Stade Hermann Frischalowski, in which she accused him of a "crime against humanity and denunciation for political reasons, causing death". A tribunal rejected the case against the former sailor because of his motive which amounted to "doing his duty against forces seeking to demoralise the army". Irene Wosikowski appealed the decision, but again the appeal was rejected because the sailor's actions were consistent with the law as it existed at the time. Alice Wosikowski died in 1949. The judgment was rescinded not until 1998, when by Sections 1 and 2 of the German law repealing wrongful National Socialist judgments in the administration of criminal justice of August 25, 1998, these verdicts of the People's Court were vacated.
