= Natalia Kozioł =

Polish rhythmic gymnast

Natalia Kozioł (born in 2000 in Gdynia, Poland) is a Polish individual rhythmic gymnast.

She is trained by Anna Mrozińska, a retired Polish rhythmic gymnast who competed at the 2004 Summer Olympics in Athens.

== Career ==
She represented Poland at the 2017 Rhythmic Gymnastics European Championships in Budapest with Małgorzata Romaniuk.

She represented Poland at the 2017 World Rhythmic Gymnastics Championship in Pesaro together with teammate Natalia Kulig. She took 38th place in all-around qualifications. She is the 2017 Polish Championships All-around gold medalist. At the 2018 Polish Championships in Gdańsk Natalia managed to defend her All-around title.
