= Ryszard Wasik =

Polish politician (1931–2021)

Member of the Sejm
- In office 19 March 1972 – 19 March 1976

Personal details
- Born: 2 May 1931 Sosnowiec, Second Polish Republic
- Died: 22 March 2021 (aged 89) Szczecin, Poland
- Party: PZPR

Ryszard Wasik (2 May 1931 – 22 March 2021) was a Polish politician and shipping captain. He served in the Sejm's Sixth Term in the People's Republic of Poland from 1972 to 1976.

== Biography ==
At the age of 14, Wasik ran away from his home in Dąbrowa Górnicza and settled in Gdynia, where he joined the crew of a fishing boat. In 1949, he was admitted to the Maritime University of Szczecin. He graduated three years later and began working for Polsteam, but was threatened with a ban on fishing from the Komitet do Spraw Bezpieczeństwa Publicznego, causing him to return to Gdynia. He then worked for Polish Ocean Lines as an officer. In 1972, he was elected to the Sejm in the Szczecin district as a member of the Polish United Workers' Party, where he was a member of the Maritime Economy and Shipping Committee and the Foreign Trade Committee. He then worked at the Polish consul of maritime affairs in New York City. Upon his return to Poland, he continued to sail until his retirement in 1991.

Ryszard Wasik died in Szczecin on 22 March 2021 at the age of 89. He was buried in the Central Cemetery, Szczecin on 31 March.
