= Heinrich Wilhelm Zimmerman =

German painter

Heinrich Wilhelm Zimmerman was a portrait painter, who was born in Danzig in 1805. In 1828 he went to Vienna, and thence, in 1835, to Paris, where he placed himself under Hippolyte Delaroche. While in Paris he painted his Sabbath Morning in Styria, a large work with twenty-six figures. On his return to Danzig he practised chiefly as a portrait painter. He died in Danzig in 1841.
