= Szymon Rogiński =

Polish photographer (born 1975)

Szymon Roginski (born 1975 in Gdańsk) is a Polish photographer.

== Biography ==
His artistic education started with the actor's studies at School on Wheels Derevo Theater, Germany/Netherlands (1997-1998). After graduating Artistic Photography Study in Gdańsk (1999-2000) Roginski started his professional career at Department of Photography at National Museum in Gdańsk (1999-2000) and at Gazeta Wyborcza photographic studio (2000-2004). He was twice (2010 and 2013) granted a scholarship of the Minister of Culture, and he teaches at Academy of Photography, in Warsaw (2012-2013).

He took part in several group shows in reputed art institutions in Poland and abroad, at Museum of Modern and Contemporary Art of Trento and Rovereto (MART) Italy (2014); BOZAR, Brussels (2012); CCA Ujazdowski Castle, Warsaw (2008) and had a solo exhibition, the last one at Aleksander Bruno Gallery, Warsaw (2014). Roginski made a name for himself with his UFO project, a series of staged shots developed from 2005-07 which used artificial lighting to conjure up night scenes of extraterrestrial landings.

In years 2003-2006, Roginski conceived the Poland Synthesis series, a nocturnal portrait of the Polish province. The one of his last project is Black, that explores the photography as a medium and examines the borderline between photography and abstract painting.

== Selected group exhibitions ==
- Perduti nel paesaggio/Lost in Landscape, Museum of Modern and Contemporary Art of Trento and Rovereto (MART) (2014)
- Home Made. Construction substitute worlds. Centre for Contemporary Art Łaźnia, Gdańsk (2013)
- Sense of Place – European Landscape Photography, BOZAR, Brussels (2012)
- Installation Camera Obscura (with Katarzyna Korzeniecka), Sculpture Museum Królikarnia, Warsaw;
- Broken Movie – BWA Wrocław (2009)
- Take a Look at me now - contemporary work from Poland
- Sainbury Centre for Visual Arts, England;
- Uncomfortable Images, 6 th Biennal of Photography, Poznań
- Urbanity – Twenty Years Later, Praha/Berlin/Bratislava/Budapest/Ljubljana/Warszawa/Wien (2008)
- Red eye effect, Centre for Contemporary Art Ujazdowski Castle, Warsaw, Poland (2006)
- The New Documentalists, Centre for Contemporary Art Ujazdowski Castle, Warsaw, Poland; National Gallery in Bratislava, Slovakia
- The End, My Friend, Spielhaus Morrisson Gallery, Berlin, Germany (2005)
- Revenge on Realism – The fictitious moment in current Polish Art, Krinziger - Projekte Gallery, Vienna, Austria (2004)
- Linger, Arsenal Gallery, Poznań, Poland

== Selected individual exhibitions ==
- Blackness, Gallery Aleksander Bruno, Warsaw, Poland (2014)
- Project UFO, Photoespana / Blanca Soto Gallery, Madrid, Spain (2012)
- Wir in Dresden, AF Gallery, Warsaw, Poland (2012)
- KRA, Gallery PF, Poznań, Poland (2012)
- Project UFO, Appendix 2, Warsaw, Poland (2009)
- Project UFO, Artist House, Jerusalem, Israel (2008)
- Project UFO, 20th Photo Biennale, Thessaloniki, Greece (2008)
- Project UFO, Biala Gallery, Lublin, Poland (2007)

== Publications ==
- Szymon Roginski, Postcards from Otwock (2013, Nowy Teatr)
- Adam Mazur, Decydujący Moment (Karakter, 2013)
- Sense of Place – European Landscape Photography (Prestel, 2012)
- High Touch – tactile design and visual explorations (Gestalten, 2012)
- Zeitgenossiche Kunstler aus Polen, Positionen Series (Steidl, 2011)
- Papercraft 2, (Gestalten, 2011)
- Zdążyć przed zachodem słońca (Raster Gallery, 2004)
