= Kseniya Zhyzhych =

Polish rhythmic gymnast

- Born: 21 April 2010 (age 16) Minsk, Belarus

Gymnastics career
- Discipline: Rhythmic gymnastics
- Country represented: Poland; (2023–present)
- Club: Akademia Leszka Blanika Warszawa
- Head coach: Adriana Szymańska
Medal record
Representing Poland
Rhythmic Gymnastics
Junior World Championships
Silver medal – second place	2025 Sofia	Clubs
European Cup
Silver medal – second place	2025 Baku	Ball
Silver medal – second place	2025 Baku	Ribbon
- Last updated on: 10 October 2026.

Kseniya Zhyzhych (born 21 April 2010) is a Polish rhythmic gymnast. At the national level, she is the 2025 Polish all-around Junior Champion.

== Career ==
=== Junior ===
In 2023, she was selected to represent Poland at international tournaments as a member of junior national group. In May, she and her teammates competed at the 2023 European Championships in Baku, Azerbaijan, where they finished on 6th place in group all-around and 7th in 5 balls final. In July she competed at the Junior World Championships in Cluj-Napoca. She and her teammates took 18th place in group all-around, 13th in 5 balls and 19th in 5 ropes qualifications.

In 2024, she competed at the 2024 Junior European Championships in Budapest. Together with Zlata Usanova and Olivia Maslov she took 9th place in Team competition. She was performing only with ribbon, with which she qualified to the final and took 7th place.

In 2025, she competed at Fellbach-Schmiden's international tournament and won gold medal in team, ball and ribbon final. At Aphrodite Cup in March, she took 11th place in all-around, 4th place in ribbon and 5th place in clubs final. In May, she competed at the 2025 European Cup in Baku, Azerbaijan. She won silver medals in ball and ribbon finals and took 5th place in clubs. In June, she was selected to represent Poland at the 2025 Junior World Championships in Sofia, Bulgaria, where she won silver medal with clubs. She also took 5th place with ball, 7th place with ribbon and 6th place in team competition with Mariia Shybanova and junior group.

=== Senior ===
In 2026, she finished on 5th place in all-around at Polish National Championships and won silver medals in team, ball, clubs and ribbon. In March, she competed at Aphrodite Cup in Greece and took 8th place in all-around. In early April, she took 9th place in all-around at Thiais Grand Prix. She was 8th in hoop final. On May 1-3, she competed at European Cup in Baku. She was 17th in hoop, 39th in ball, 18th in clubs and 24th in ribbon. On May 15-17, she competed at Portimao World Challenge Cup and ended on 15th place in all-around. In October, she competed at International tournament Aura Cup in Croatia and took 4th place in all-around. She won silver in ball and bronze in clubs final.

== Routine music information ==
Year	Apparatus	Music title
2026	Hoop	Can You See Me by Power-Haus
2026	Ball	House of the Rising Sun by Erik Grönwall
2026	Clubs	Growing Pressure Alternate by Gabriel Saban
2026	Ribbon	
2025	Hoop	Do the Skeleton Scat! by The Wiggles
2025	Ball	Witching Hour by Eternal Eclipse
2025	Clubs	You're the One That I Want by John Travolta, Olivia Newton-John
2025	Ribbon	A Big Hunk o' Love by Elvis Presley, The Royal Philharmonic Orchestra
2024	Hoop	
2024	Ball	
2024	Clubs	
2024	Ribbon	A Big Hunk o' Love by Elvis Presley, The Royal Philharmonic Orchestra
