= Mateusz Mach =

Polish entrepreneur and investor (born 1997)

Mateusz Andrzej Mach
- Born: April 15, 1997 (age 29); Gdańsk, Poland
- Education: New York University Abu Dhabi
- Known for: Five App, Nextrope
- Awards: Forbes 30 Under 30, New Europe 100 List

Mateusz Mach (born April 15, 1997) is a Polish entrepreneur. He is the founder of the financial technology firm Nextrope and the creator of Five App, the first sign language messaging application. In 2017, he was named to the European edition of the Forbes 30 Under 30 list.

== Education ==
Mach completed an International Baccalaureate Diploma at III Liceum Ogólnokształcące im. Marynarki Wojennej RP w Gdyni in Gdynia, Poland. He subsequently enrolled at New York University Abu Dhabi to study economics.

== Career ==
In 2015, at the age of 17 Mateusz Mach debuted as an entrepreneur when he introduced the Five App start-up. The mobile application was the world's first sign language messenger, enabling deaf people to communicate efficiently using Android- and iOS-based devices. As a social impact project, the Five App was largely acclaimed among the targeted audience and acquired over ten thousands of users.

Following the release of the application, Mach was included in the 2016 New Europe 100 list, compiled by Google and the Financial Times. In 2017, he was named to the European edition of the Forbes 30 Under 30 list.

In 2018, Mach founded Nextrope, a company focused on developing financial technology software for institutional clients.
