= Alice Wosikowski =

German politician

- Born: Alice Ludwig; 18 October 1886; Danzig, West Prussia, German Empire
- Died: 4 July 1949 (aged 62); Hamburg, West Germany
- Occupations: Activist and politician
- Political party: SPD; KPD
- Spouse(s): 1. Wilhelm Wosikowski; 2.
- Children: Eberhard Wosikowski (1908–2004); Irene Wosikowski (1910–1944)

Alice Wosikowski (born Alice Ludwig; 18 October 1886 – 4 July 1949) was a German politician (SPD, KPD) who became a member of the Hamburg Parliament between 1927 and 1933. After 1933 she became a resistance activist: much of her life during the twelve Nazi years was spent in government detention institutions.

== Life ==
Alice Ludwig was born the youngest of four recorded siblings in Danzig in West Prussia (present-day Gdańsk, Poland). Her father was a master tailor. After leaving the local school she undertook a two-year traineeship for work as a Kindergarten teacher, and this is the profession she was still following in 1907 when she married Wilhelm Wosikowski, described variously as a machinist and a port worker. He was also a committed trades unionist and Social Democrat. Alice was also a party member. Their first child, Eberhard, was born in 1908; Irene, their daughter, was born two years later. However, because of his trades union involvement Wilhelm Wosikowski found it increasingly difficult to find work in Danzig. He received what one source identifies as "a reprimand" in 1911: later that year the little family relocated to Kiel, still on Germany's northern coast, but far to the west of Danzig.

In July 1914, World War I was declared and Wilhelm Wosikowski was conscripted into the army. He was killed in France a few months later, in October. The small pension Alice received was not sufficient for the family's needs and she needed to work. However, the children were still small, so she was initially restricted to work that could be done at home. She also engaged in political women's and youth work. She was employed between 1915 and 1921 in welfare work for the municipality. At some point during 1921 she married her late husband's brother or cousin (sources differ). It was also in 1921 that she moved with her children to Hamburg.

In Hamburg Alice Wosikowski became, like her new husband, a member of the recently launched Communist Party ("Kommunistische Partei Deutschlands" / KPD). Her new husband's work as a leading bargeman meant that he was relatively well paid: Alice no longer needed to work in order to survive. Managing their family home in the "Seumestrasse" ("Seume Street") was less than a full-time occupation, however, and she found time and energy for politics. She headed up the women's section in the District Leadership Team ("Bezirksleitung") of the party's important "Wasserkante" district (which included Hamburg). From 1927 till its formal dissolution in 1929/30 Alice Wosikowski served in succession to Maria Grünert as leader of the Hamburg district group of the Red Women's and Girl's League ("Rote Frauen und Mädchenbund" / RFMB) which was the women's version of the quasi-military Red Front Fighters, operating under the auspices of the Communist Party. The objective was to awaken political awareness, on behalf of the party, among working women. Principal demands included equal workplace treatment for women and men, prevention of mass unemployment and the abolition of the country's restrictive abortion laws. Along with these activities, between 1927 and 1933 Wosikowski sat as a Communist member of the Hamburg Parliament ("Bürgerschaft") where she took a lead on issues concerning working women. She was a particularly determined advocate on behalf of women working in the city's important fish processing industry.

Her second husband, who during the later 1920s had been working for the Hamburger Volkszeitung (communist newspaper), died in 1930 and Alice Wosikowski returned to paid employment. By the end of 1930 she was herself working for the Hamburger Volkszeitung, at this stage still in a relatively lowly capacity in the accounts department. She stayed with the newspaper till 1933 when it was closed down.

In January 1933 the Nazis took power and lost no time in transforming Germany into a one-party dictatorship. Although all "political activity" (unless by or on behalf of the Nazi Party) was banned, it was Communist Party politicians and activists on whom relevant state agencies concentrated their attention, especially after the Reichstag Fire in February 1933 and its carefully choreographed aftermath. Towards the end of 1933 the RFMB, which had operated in the shadows as a semi-legal organisation since the government ban on the Red Front Fighters in 1929, decided to further its objectives by working within the "women's and girls' Squadron" ("Frauen- und Mädchenstaffel") of the newly founded Anti-fascist Fighting Association ("Kampfbund gegen den Faschismus"). Alice Wosikowski was arrested and taken into "protective custody" in 1933–1934. She was arrested and detained again during 1936–1937, and then a third time from 1939 till 1941. During the first period of detention she was held at the Fuhlsbüttel facility in Hamburg that operated under the control of Nazi paramilitaries ("SS"). In 1936–1937 she was held at Moringen, a former workhouse in a country town south of Hanover, designated after the Nazi take-over as a concentration camp for women. Her third, longer, period of incarceration was at the Ravensbrück concentration camp, set on the marshy flat lands to the north of Berlin.

According to one source it was Alice's son, Eberhard Wosikowski, by now serving in the army, who was able to extract her from the concentration camp in 1941. She now worked between 1941 and 1945 as a book keeper with a textiles firm.

When World War II ended and the régime collapsed in May 1945, Alice Wosikowski and Eberhard were still alive. Alice's younger child, Irene was dead. Like many exiled German communists Irene Wosikowski was in France in May/June 1940 when the German army annexed the northern half of the country and imposed a puppet government on the southern half. She was arrested and placed in the Gurs internment camp west of Lourdes, far to the south. But by the July 1940 Irene Wosikowski had, with others, escaped captivity. She now based herself in Marseille becoming, according to some versions, a member of the French resistance. One particularly high risk activity that she favoured involved engaging off-duty German soldiers in conversation in order to try and get them to think about the logic and objectives of genocide. She was arrested in July 1943 as a suspected spy, interrogated and badly tortured by the Marseille Gestapo before being transferred to occupied Paris where she was tortured as her interrogators again attempted, without success, to obtain the names of her contacts. The pattern was repeated when she was taken to Fuhlsbüttel in Germany and again after she was taken to the Barnim Street Women's Prison in Berlin. Alice Wosikowski learned of her daughter's arrest in March 1944 and was able to visit Irene in prison at least once. When visiting she was permitted to talk with her daughter. She was also engaged in conversation by "Gestapo man Teege". More than three years later Alice Wosikowski would find herself called upon to testify at Gestapo man Teege's war crimes trial. In her statement dated 13 January 1948 Alice Wosikowski testified that Teege had offered her the opportunity to work for the Gestapo. He intended her to understand that by accepting his offer she could save her daughter's life. Wosikowski had already related this encounter in a Hamburg newspaper in October 1946. Her reaction to Teege's suggestion was that her daughter would have looked upon her with total contempt if she had paid such a price to save her child's life. ("Meine Tochter würde mich verachten, wenn ich um solchen Preis ihren Kopf retten wollte.") Irene Wosikowski faced the special "People's Court" in Berlin on 13 September 1944 and was condemned to death. She was executed on 27 October 1944.

Directly after the war ended Alice Wosikowski returned to the Hamburger Volkszeitung, now as a deputy publishing head with a senior position in the finance department. In April 1949 she was elected to chair the newspaper section of the German Salaried Employees' Union ("Deutsche Angestellten-Gewerkschaft" / DAG). However, she died in Hamburg April or July 1949. (Note: Sources differ as to whether she died in Hamburg or in Moringen. Moringen is the location of a concentration camp where she had been held more than ten years earlier, but there is no reason disclosed in the sources why she should have returned there to die. A misunderstanding is suspected and Hamburg as her place of death seems far more likely. Sources also differ over whether she died on 7. 4. 1949 or 4. 7. 1949. One of the dates presumably reflects the north American approach to writing dates numerically and the other reflects the way numerical dates are conventionally set out in most of Europe – including Germany and England. Substituting words, this indicates that she died either on 7 April 1949 or 4 July 1949. The sources accessed (which do not include either her entry in the official registry or her grave stone) are evenly split between the two.)
