= Małgorzata Roszatycka =

Polish rhythmic gymnast (born 2003)

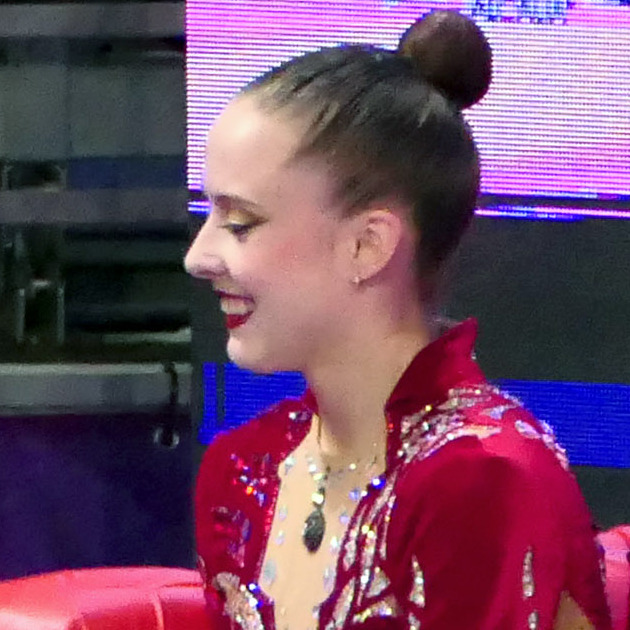
- Roszatycka in 2024

Personal information
- Nicknames: Gosia, Malgosia
- Born: 14 February 2003 (age 23) Szczecin, Poland

Gymnastics career
- Discipline: Rhythmic gymnastics
- Country represented: Poland; (2017-2024)
- Club: SGA MKS Pogon Szczecin
- Head coach: Inga Buczyńska
- Assistant coach: Agnieszka Górska
Medal record
Rhythmic gymnastics
Representing Poland
| Event | 1st | 2nd | 3rd |
|---|---|---|---|
| FIG World Cup | 2 | 1 | 1 |
| Total | 2 | 1 | 1 |

Malgorzata Roszatycka (born 14 February 2003) is a Polish rhythmic gymnast. She was part of the group that won the first gold medal in a World Cup final.

== Career ==
=== Junior ===
Malgorzata debuted with the national team at the 2017 European Championships in Budapest where, as a member of the junior group, was 11th in the All-Around.

=== Senior ===
She became a senior in 2019, competing at the World Cup in Cluj-Napoca being 29th in the All-Around, 29th with hoop, 31st with ball, 32nd with clubs and 22nd with ribbon.

After the 2020 season was cut short because of the COVID-19 pandemic, she resorted to competition at the 2021 World Cup in Sofia ending 42nd in the All-Around, 32nd with hoop, 53rd with ball, 36th with clubs and 46th with ribbon. In May she took part in the stage in Baku, taking 46th place in the All-Around, 52nd with hoop, 45th with ball, 38th with clubs and 40th with ribbon. A month later she was selected for the European Championships in Varna along the senior group, ending 35th in the All-Around, 30th with hoop, 31st with ball, 39th with clubs and 26th with ribbon. At the World Cup in Cluj-Napoca she was 15th in the All-Around, 16th with hoop, 17th with ball, 18th with clubs and 10th with ribbon. She then concluded her season at the World Championships in Kitakyushu, finishing 26th in the All-Around, 24th with hoop, 36th with ball, 30th with clubs and 39th with ribbon.

In 2022 she debuted at the World Cup in Baku, ending 17th in the All-Around, 28th with hoop, 30th with ball, 9th with clubs and 11th with ribbon. In June she competed in Pesaro being 33rd in the All-Around, 31st with hoop, 32nd with ball, 33rd with clubs and 36th with ribbon. Then she went on to compete at the European Championships in Tel Aviv, ending 12th in teams, 25th in the All-Around, 27th with hoop, 42nd with ball, 17th with clubs and 19th with ribbon. She also took part in the last World Cup of the season in Cluj-Napoca, taking 15th place in the All-Around, 16th with hoop, 17th with ball, 18th with clubs and 10th with ribbon. Roszatycka was selected for the World Championships in Sofia ending 28th in the All-Around, 47th with hoop, 27th with ball, 33rd with clubs and 13th with ribbon.

The following year she switched to the group modality, debuting in the World Cup in Athens where the group won bronze with 5 hoops. Two weeks later in Sofia they were 5th in the All-Around and won an unprecedented gold medal in the 3 ribbons + 2 balls' final.

In March 2024 she won gold with 3 ribbons and 2 balls at the World Cup in Athens. Two weeks later the group won bronze in the same event in Sofia. In May, she and her group (Mariia Balakina, Madoka Przybylska, Julia Wojciechowska, Magdalena Szewczuk, Milena Górska) competed at the 2024 European Championships in Budapest, Hungary. They took 8th place in all-around and 5th place in 3 Ribbons + 2 Balls.
