= Inga Buczyńska =

Polish gymnast

Inga Buczynska
- Born: 26 January 1990 (age 36) Warsaw, Poland

Gymnastics career
- Discipline: Rhythmic gymnastics
- Country represented: Poland (2007-2009)

Inga Buczyńska (born 26 January 1990) is a former Polish rhythmic gymnast and current coach of the national group.

== Career ==
As a gymnast she participated in the 2007 World Championships in Patras, Greece, as a member of the Polish group, finishing 14th in the All-Around, 16th with 5 ropes and 10th with 3 hoops and 4 clubs. She was also selected for the 2009 World Championships in Mie, Japan, they were 11th in the All-Around, 9th with 5 hoops and 13th with 3 ribbons and 2 ropes.

In 2022 she was appointed coach for the senior national group of Poland, they debuted at the World Cup in Athens, winning bronze in the All-Around and with 3 ribbons and 2 balls and silver with 5 hoops. In May the group participated in the stage in Portimão winning bronze in the All-Around and with 3 ribbons and 2 balls and silver with 5 hoops. In June the group travelled to Pesaro, being 12th in the All-Around. At the 2022 European Championships in Tel Aviv, where Poland was 9th in the All-Around, 8th in the 5 hoops final and 10th with 3 ribbons + 2 balls. In September she accompanied her girls in the World Championships in Sofia, taking 13th place in the All-Around, 10th with 5 hoops and 14th with 3 ribbons + 2 balls. On April 2, 2023, the group, made of Milena Górska, Julia Wojciechowska, Małgorzata Roszatycka, Madoka Przybylska and Magdalena Szewczuk, won Poland's first World Cup gold medal in the 3 ribbons + 2 balls final in Sofia.
