= Germany's national rhythmic gymnastics team =

National rhythmic gymnastics team

Germany
- Continental union: European Union of Gymnastics
- National federation: German Gymnastics Federation
- Head coach: Yulia Raskina (individuals); Camilla Pfeffer (group)
- Training location: Bundesstützpunkt, Fellbach-Schmiden

Olympic Games
- Medals: Gold: 2024; Bronze: 1984

World Championships
- Medals: Gold: 2025; Silver: 2022, 2023

European Championships
- Medals: Bronze: 2000

Germany's national rhythmic gymnastics team represents Germany in international competitions organised by the International Federation of Gymnastics (FIG).

== History ==
Germany has participated in the Olympic Games individual competition nine times (twice as West Germany). They won a bronze medal in 1984 and a gold medal in 2024. In the group competition Germany competed five times.

== Current senior roster ==
Individuals
Name	Birth date and age	Hometown
Lisa Garac	June 19, 2010 (age 16)	
Margarita Kolosov	March 11, 2004 (age 22)	Potsdam
Lada Pusch	March 19, 2008 (age 18)	Müllheim
Anastasia Simakova	September 9, 2004 (age 22)	Omsk, Russia
Viktoria Steinfeld	July 9, 2008 (age 18)	
Darja Varfolomeev	November 4, 2006 (age 20)	Barnaul, Russia

Group
Name	Birth date and age	Hometown
Melanie Dargel	September 16, 2005 (age 21)	Euskirchen
Alisa Datsenko	February 8, 2010 (age 16)	Mannheim
Olivia Falk	September 29, 2009 (age 17)	
Anja Kosan	December 12, 2002 (age 23)	Berlin
Alina Ott	November 7, 2009 (age 17)	Nuremberg
Helena Ripken	July 18, 2006 (age 20)	Berlin
Anna-Maria Shatokhin	April 2, 2007 (age 19)	Bad Urach
Katja Tenenbaum	November 23, 2007 (age 18)	
Emilia Wickert	January 25, 2007 (age 19)	Ulm

== Staff ==
- Isabell Sawade - Team Lead
- Yulia Raskina - Individuals Head Coach
- Camilla Pfeffer - Group Head Coach

== Team competition results ==
=== World Championships ===
Year	Position	Squad
1991	8th	Sandra Schöck, Michaela Ziegler
1993	6th	Magdalena Brzeska, Nicole Gerdes
1995	6th	Magdalena Brzeska, Kristin Sroka
1997	4th	Helene Asmus, Magdalena Brzeska, Edita Schaufler, Monique Strobl
1999	4th	Helene Asmus, Edita Schaufler, Monique Strobl
2001		
2003	15th	Raissa Feldmann, Lisa Ingildeeva, Eugenia Ramich
2005		
2007	14th	Johanna Gabor, Lisa Ingildeeva, Daria Stolbin
2009		
2010		
2011		
2013		
2014		
2015		
2018		
2019		
2021		
2022	Silver medal	Margarita Kolosov, Darja Varfolomeev, Anja Kosan, Daniella Kromm, Alina Oganesyan, Francine Schöning, Hannah Vester
2023	Silver medal	Margarita Kolosov, Darja Varfolomeev, Anja Kosan, Daniella Kromm, Alina Oganesyan, Hannah Vester, Emilia Wickert
2025	Gold medal	Anastasia Simakova, Darja Varfolomeev, Melanie Dargel, Olivia Falk, Anja Kosan, Helena Ripken, Anna-Maria Shatokhin, Emilia Wickert
2026	4th	Lada Pusch, Anastasia Simakova, Darja Varfolomeev, Alisa Datsenko, Anja Kosan, Alina Ott, Helena Ripken, Anna-Maria Shatokhin
