= German Rhythmic Gymnastics Championships =

The German Rhythmic Gymnastics Championship is the most important national rhythmic gymnastics competition in Germany.

== History ==
It is organized since 1955, annually since 1959, by the German Gymnastics Federation. Today it's part of the event "Die Finals". Prior to 1991 it served only West Germany, gymnasts from East competeted in the DDR National Championships.

== Medalists ==
=== All-Around ===
Year	Gold	Silver	Bronze
1955	Sabine Wassmundt	unknown	unknown
1957	Sybille von Gleich	unknown	unknown
1959	Christa Hacker	unknown	unknown
1960	Ursula Brian	unknown	unknown
1961	Helga Müller	unknown	unknown
1962	Editha Brüning	unknown	unknown
1963	Maren Klüssendorf	unknown	unknown
1964	Maren Klüssendorf	unknown	unknown
1965	Maren Klüssendorf	unknown	unknown
1966	Maren Klüssendorf	unknown	unknown
1967	Maren Klüssendorf	unknown	unknown
1968	Maren Klüssendorf	unknown	unknown
1969	Gisela Hörmann	unknown	unknown
1970	Petra Gröncke	unknown	unknown
1971	Petra Gröncke	unknown	unknown
1972	Sabine Wassmundt	unknown	unknown
1973	Carmen Rischer	unknown	unknown
1974	Carmen Rischer	unknown	unknown
1975	Ute Barylla	unknown	unknown
1976	Carmen Rischer	unknown	unknown
1977	Carmen Rischer	unknown	unknown
1978	Carmen Rischer	unknown	unknown
1979	Carmen Rischer	unknown	unknown
1980	Anke Abraham	unknown	unknown
1981	Regina Weber	unknown	unknown
1982	Regina Weber	unknown	unknown
1983	Regina Weber	unknown	unknown
1984	Regina Weber	unknown	unknown
1985	Regina Weber	unknown	unknown
1986	Regina Weber	Kristin Fruhwirth	Dörte Koch
1987	Marion Rothhaar	Regina Weber	Diana Schmiemann
1988	Diana Schmiemann	Dörte Koch	Marion Rothaar
1989	Marion Rothaar	Dörte Koch	Manuela Trenz
1990	Michaela Ziegler	Marion Rothaar	Dörte Koch
1991	Sandra Schöck	Michaela Ziegler	Marion Rothaar
1992	Christiane Klumpp	Magdalena Brzeska	Martina Smetak
1993	Magdalena Brzeska	Christiane Klumpp	Nicole Gerdes
1994	Magdalena Brzeska	Nicole Gerdes	Martina Smetak
1995	Magdalena Brzeska	Kristin Sroka	Nicole Gerdes
1996	Magdalena Brzeska	Kristin Sroka	Edita Schaufler
1997	Edita Schaufler	Helene Asmus	Laura Martin
1998	Edita Schaufler	Helene Asmus	Monique Strobl
1999	Edita Schaufler	Monique Strobl	Melanie Putze
2000	Edita Schaufler	Helene Asmus	Monique Strobl
2001	Helene Asmus	Olga Lukjanov	Sandy Liebehenschel
2002	Annika Rejek	Isabell Piepiorra	Alexandra Gabriel
2003	Lisa Ingildeeva	Eugenia Ramich	Raisa Feldmann
2004	Lisa Ingildeeva	Eugenia Ramich	Raisa Feldmann
2005	Lisa Ingildeeva	Klaudia Wettmann	Daria Stolbin
2006	Johanna Gabor	Klaudia Wittmann	Daria Stolbin
2007	Klaudia Wettmann	Annika Rejek	Alexandra Zapekina
2008	Karolina Raskina	Johanna Gabor	Alexandra Zapekina
2009	Annika Rejek	Karolina Raskina	
2010	Alexandra Zapekina	Lena Rübke	Nicole Wagner
2011	Laura Jung	Alexandra Zapekina	Christina Chernischew
2012	Laura Jung	Rana Tokmak	Lea Godejohann
2013	Jana Berezko-Marggrander	Laura Jung	Darja Sajfutdinova
2014	Jana Berezko-Marggrander	Laura Jung	Darja Sajfutdinova
2015	Jana Berezko-Marggrander	Laura Jung	Karin Smirnov
2016	Laura Jung	Jana Berezko-Marggrander	
2017	Lea Tkaltschewitsch	Alina Diakov	Julia Stavickaja
2018	Lea Tkaltschewitsch	Noemi Peschel	Julia Stavickaja
2019	Emeli Erbes	Julia Stavickaja	Kathrin Arovoj
2020	cancelled due to COVID-19		
2021	Margarita Kolosov	Melanie Dargel	Sandy Kruse
2022	Darja Varfolomeev	Margarita Kolosov	Melanie Dargel
2023	Darja Varfolomeev	Margarita Kolosov	Anna Shenenko
2024	Margarita Kolosov	Darja Varfolomeev	Anastasia Simakova
2025	Darja Varfolomeev	Anastasia Simakova	Viktoria Steinfeld
2026	Darja Varfolomeev	Lada Pusch	Anastasia Simakova

=== Rope ===
Year	Gold	Silver	Bronze
1971	Ute Barylla	Unknown	Unknown
1972	Petra Gröncke	Unknown	Unknown
1976	Christiana Rosenberg	Unknown	Unknown
1977	Irene Gödecke	Unknown	Unknown
1979	Carmen Rischer	Unknown	Unknown
1980	Anke Abraham	Unknown	Unknown
1981	Regina Weber	Unknown	Unknown
1982	Regina Weber	Unknown	Unknown
1985	Regina Weber	Unknown	Unknown
1986	Regina Weber	Unknown	Unknown
1987	Marion Rothaar	Regina Weber	Diana Schmiemann
1988	Diana Schmiemann	Dörte Koch	Marion Rothaar
1989	Marion Rothaar	Dörte Koch	Manuela Trenz
1990	Michaela Ziegler	Sandra Schöck	Martina Smetak
1991	Sandra Schöck	Silke Neumann	Patricia Krafczyk
1992	Christiane Klumpp	Magdalena Brzeska	Martina Smetak
1993	Magdalena Brzeska	Nicole Gerdes	Kristin Sroka
1994	Nicole Gerdes	Magdalena Brzeska	Martina Smetak
1995	Magdalena Brzeska	Nicole Gerdes	Kristin Sroka
1996	Magdalena Brzeska	Kristin Sroka	Ines Bencun
1997	Helene Asmus	Edita Schaufler	Laura Martin
1998	Edita Schaufler	Helene Asmus	Monique Strobl
1999	Edita Schaufler	Monique Strobl	Galina Savtchits
2000	Edita Schaufler	Helene Asmus	Galina Savtchits
2001	Helene Asmus	Sandy Liebehenschel	Olga Lukjanov
2002	Annika Rejek	Isabell Piepiorra	Alexandra Gabriel
2005	Daria Stolbin	Klaudia Wittmann	Luisa Mehwitz
2006	Johanna Gabor	Klaudia Wittmann	Daria Stolbin
2007	Klaudia Wittmann	Aleksandra Zapekina	Annika Rejek
2008	Johanna Gabor	Karolina Raskina	Aleksandra Zapekina
2009			
2010	Lena Rübke	Aleksandra Zapekina	Kristina Gukowa

=== Hoop ===
Year	Gold	Silver	Bronze
1971	Sabine Wassmundt	Unknown	Unknown
1972	Sybille von Gleich	Unknown	Unknown
1973	Carmen Rischer	Unknown	Unknown
1974	Carmen Rischer	Unknown	Unknown
1975	Ute Barylla	Unknown	Unknown
1976	Carmen Rischer	Unknown	Unknown
1977	Carmen Rischer	Unknown	Unknown
1978	Carmen Rischer	Unknown	Unknown
1980	Carmen Rischer	Unknown	Unknown
1981	Regina Weber	Unknown	Unknown
1982	Regina Weber	Unknown	Unknown
1983	Regina Weber	Unknown	Marion Rothaar
1984	Regina Weber	Unknown	Unknown
1987	Marion Rothaar	Regina Weber	Diana Schmiemann
1988	Diana Schmiemann	Marion Rothaar	Dörte Koch
1989	Marion Rothaar Dörte Koch	none awarded	Manuela Trenz
1990	Michaela Ziegler	Dörte Koch	Sandra Schöck
1991	Sandra Schöck Michaela Ziegler	none awarded	Silke Neumann
1992	Christiane Klumpp	Magdalena Brzeska	Martina Smetak
1993	Magdalena Brzeska	Nicole Gerdes	Sandra Schöck
1994	Magdalena Brzeska	Nicole Gerdes	Kristin Sroka
1997	Edita Schaufler	Helene Asmus	Laura Martin
1998	Edita Schaufler	Helene Asmus	Monique Strobl
1999	Helene Asmus	Monique Strobl	Galina Savtchits
2000	Helene Asmus	Edita Schaufler	Galina Savtchits
2001	Olga Lukjanov	Helene Asmus	Sandy Liebehenschel
2002	Isabell Piepiorra	Annika Rejek	Anne Isbaner
2003	Lisa Ingildeeva	Eugenia Ramich	Raisa Feldmann
2004	Lisa Ingildeeva	Raisa Feldmann	Daria Stolbin
2007	Klaudia Wittmann	Lisa Ingildeeva	Daria Stolbin
2008	Annika Rejek	Aleksandra Zapekina	Karolina Raskina
2009			
2010	Lena Rübke	Aleksandra Zapekina	Kristina Gukowa
2011	Laura Jung	Aleksandra Zapekina	Christina Chernischew
2012			
2013	Jana Berezko-Marggrander	Darja Sajfutdinova	Laura Jung
2014	Jana Berezko-Marggrander	Laura Jung	Darja Sajfutdinova
2015	Laura Jung	Jana Berezko-Marggrander	Karin Smirnov
2016	Jana Berezko-Marggrander	Laura Jung	Alina Diakov
2017	Lea Tkaltschewitsch	Julia Stavickaja	Viktoria Burjak
2018	Lea Tkaltschewitsch	Julia Stavickaja	Noemi Peschel
2019	Emeli Erbes	Julia Stavickaja	Marlene Kriebel
2020	Cancelled due to Covid-19		
2021	Margarita Kolosov	Melanie Dargel	Sandy Kruse
2022	Darja Varfolomeev	Margarita Kolosov	Helena Ripken
2023	Darja Varfolomeev	Melanie Dargel	Anna Shenenko
2024	Darja Varfolomeev	Margarita Kolosov	Lada Pusch
2025	Darja Varfolomeev	Margarita Kolosov	Viktoria Steinfeld
2026	Darja Varfolomeev	Lada Pusch	Viktoria Steinfeld

=== Ball ===
Year	Gold	Silver	Bronze
1971	Sabine Wassmundt	Unknown	Unknown
1972	Sabine Wassmundt	Unknown	Unknown
1973	Jutta Bachmann	Unknown	Unknown
1974	Evelyn Jandl	Unknown	Unknown
1975	Christiana Rosenberg	Unknown	Unknown
1976	Carmen Rischer	Unknown	Unknown
1977	Carmen Rischer	Unknown	Unknown
1978	Regina Weber	Unknown	Unknown
1979	Carmen Rischer	Unknown	Unknown
1983	Regina Weber	Unknown	Unknown
1984	Regina Weber	Unknown	Unknown
1985	Regina Weber	Unknown	Unknown
1986	Regina Weber	Dörte Koch Kristin Fruhwirth	none awarded
1989	Dörte Koch	Marion Rothaar Manuela Trenz	none awarded
1990	Michaela Ziegler Dörte Koch Marion Rothaar	none awarded	none awarded
1991	Silke Neumann Marion Rothaar	none awarded	Sandra Schöck
1992	Magdalena Brzeska	Christiane Klumpp	Martina Smetak
1993	Magdalena Brzeska	Christiane Klumpp	Nicole Gerdes
1994	Magdalena Brzeska	Kristin Sroka	Martina Smetak
1995	Magdalena Brzeska	Kristin Sroka	Nicole Gerdes
1996	Magdalena Brzeska	Edita Schaufler	Kristin Sroka
1999	Edita Schaufler	Monique Strobl	Galina Savtchits
2000	Edita Schaufler Helene Asmus	none awarded	Galina Savtchits Monique Strobl
2001	Helene Asmus	Sandy Liebehenschel	Olga Lukjanov
2002	Annika Rejek	Alexandra Gabriel	Cäcilia Suwerowa
2003	Lisa Ingildeeva	Eugenia Ramich	Raisa Feldmann
2004	Lisa Ingildeeva	Eugenia Ramich	Daria Stolbin
2005	Klaudia Wittmann	Daria Stolbin	Jessika Kohsyk
2006	Johanna Gabor	Luisa Mehwitz	Daria Stolbin
2009			
2010	Lena Rübke	Aleksandra Zapekina	Kristina Gukowa
2011	Laura Jung	Aleksandra Zapekina	Christina Chernischew
2012			
2013	Jana Berezko-Marggrander	Laura Jung	Darja Sajfutdinova
2014	Jana Berezko-Marggrander	Laura Jung	Darja Sajfutdinova
2015	Laura Jung	Jana Berezko-Marggrander	Karin Smirnov
2016	Jana Berezko-Marggrander	Laura Jung	Alina Diakov
2017	Lea Tkaltschewitsch	Alina Diakov	Julia Stavickaja
2018	Lea Tkaltschewitsch	Noemi Peschel	Marlene Kriebel
2019	Emeli Erbes	Julia Stavickaja	Marlene Kriebel
2020	cancelled due to Covid-19		
2021	Margarita Kolosov	Melanie Dargel	Sandy Kruse
2022	Darja Varfolomeev	Margarita Kolosov	Helena Ripken
2023	Darja Varfolomeev	Margarita Kolosov	Melanie Dargel
2024	Margarita Kolosov	Darja Varfolomeev	Lada Pusch
2025	Darja Varfolomeev	Viktoria Steinfeld	Lada Pusch Anastasia Simakova
2026	Darja Varfolomeev	Margarita Kolosov	Lisa Garac

=== Clubs ===
Year	Gold	Silver	Bronze
1972	Petra Gröncke	Unknown	Unknown
1973	Sybille von Gleich	Unknown	Unknown
1974	Carmen Rischer	Unknown	Unknown
1975	Carmen Rischer	Unknown	Unknown
1978	Regina Weber	Unknown	Unknown
1979	Regina Weber	Unknown	Unknown
1980	Anke Abraham	Unknown	Unknown
1981	Carmen Rischer	Unknown	Unknown
1982	Regina Weber	Unknown	Unknown
1983	Regina Weber	Unknown	Unknown
1984	Regina Weber	Unknown	Unknown
1985	Regina Weber	Unknown	Unknown
1986	Regina Weber Kristin Frühwirth	none awarded	Dörte Koch
1987	Diana Schmiemann	Regina Weber	Bettina Bothor
1988	Diana Schmiemann	Marion Rothaar	Dörte Koch
1991	Silke Neumann	Marion Rothaar	Sandra Schöck
1992	Magdalena Brzeska	Christiane Klumpp	Martina Smetak
1993	Magdalena Brzeska	Christiane Klumpp	Nicole Gerdes
1994	Magdalena Brzeska	Nicole Gerdes	Martina Smetak
1995	Magdalena Brzeska	Kristin Sroka	Nicole Gerdes
1996	Magdalena Brzeska	Kristin Sroka Edita Schaufler Laura Martin	none awarded
1997	Edita Schaufler	Helene Asmus	Melanie Putzer
1998	Edita Schaufler	Helene Asmus	Monique Strobl
2001	Olga Lukjanov	Sandy Liebehenschel	Helene Asmus
2002	Annika Rejer	Cäcilia Suwerowa	Isabell Piepiorra
2003	Lisa Ingildeeva	Eugenia Ramich	Raisa Feldmann
2004	Lisa Ingildeeva	Eugenia Ramich	Daria Stolbin
2005	Luisa Mehwitz	Klaudia Wittmann	Melanie Kopp
2006	Klaudia Wittmann	Daria Stolbin	Johanna Gabor
2007	Lisa Ingildeeva	Klaudia Wittmann	Daria Stolbin
2008	Karolina Raskina	Johanna Gabor	Annika Rejek
2011	Laura Jung	Christina Chernischew	Aleksandra Zapekina
2012			
2013	Jana Berezko-Marggrander	Laura Jung	Aleksandra Zapekina
2014	Jana Berezko-Marggrander	Laura Jung	Darja Sajfutdinova
2015	Jana Berezko-Marggrander	Laura Jung	Karin Smirnov
2016	Laura Jung	Jana Berezko-Marggrander	Alina Diakov
2017	Lea Tkaltschewitsch	Alina Diakov	Viktoria Burjak
2018	Lea Tkaltschewitsch	Julia Stavickaja	Noemi Peschel
2019	Julia Stavickaja	Emeli Erbes	Anja Kosan
2020	cancelled due to Covid-19		
2021	Margarita Kolosov	Melanie Dargel	Julia Stavickaja
2022	Darja Varfolomeev	Margarita Kolosov	Julia Stavickaja
2023	Darja Varfolomeev	Margarita Kolosov	Melanie Dargel
2024	Darja Varfolomeev	Margarita Kolosov	Lada Pusch
2025	Darja Varfolomeev	Anastasia Simakova	Lada Pusch
2026	Lada Pusch	Viktoria Steinfeld	Lisa Garac

=== Ribbon ===
Year	Gold	Silver	Bronze
1971	Gisela Arkenberg	Unknown	Unknown
1972	Sabine Wassmundt	Unknown	Unknown
1973	Carmen Rischer	Unknown	Unknown
1974	Carmen Rischer	Unknown	Unknown
1975	Carmen Rischer	Unknown	Unknown
1976	Carmen Rischer	Unknown	Unknown
1977	Carmen Rischer	Unknown	Unknown
1978	Carmen Rischer	Unknown	Unknown
1979	Carmen Rischer	Unknown	Unknown
1980	Carmen Rischer	Unknown	Unknown
1981	Regina Weber	Unknown	Unknown
1982	Regina Weber	Unknown	Unknown
1983	Regina Weber	Unknown	Unknown
1984	Regina Weber	Unknown	Unknown
1985	Regina Weber	Unknown	Unknown
1986	Regina Weber	Kristin Fruhwirth	Dörte Koch
1987	Marion Rothaar	Regina Weber	Diana Schmiemann
1988	Diana Schmiemann	Dörte Koch	Manuela Trenz
1989	Manuela Trenz	Marion Rothaar	Dörte Koch
1990	Dörte Koch Marion Rothaar	none awarded	Michaela Ziegler
1993	Magdalena Brzeska	Christiane Klumpp	Martina Smetak
1994	Magdalena Brzeska	Nicole Gerdes	Kristin Sroka
1995	Magdalena Brzeska	Nicole Gerdes	Kristin Sroka
1996	Kristin Sroka	Magdalena Brzeska	Edita Schaufler
1997	Edita Schaufler	Helene Asmus	Melanie Putze
1998	Helene Asmus	Monique Strobl	Melanie Putze
1999	Galina Savtchits	Helene Asmus Monique Strobl	none awarded
2000	Helene Asmus Galina Savtchits	none awarded	Edita Schaufler
2003	Lisa Ingildeeva	Eugenia Ramich	Raisa Feldmann
2004	Lisa Ingildeeva	Eugenia Ramich	Luisa Mehwitz
2005	Klaudia Wittmann	Daria Stolbin	Jessika Kohsyk
2006	Johanna Gabor	Klaudia Wittmann	Daria Stolbin
2007	Lisa Ingildeeva	Klaudia Wittmann	Daria Stolbin
2008	Karolina Raskina	Johanna Gabor	Annika Rejek
2009			
2010	Lena Rübke	Aleksandra Zapekina	Lisa Catharina Jöhnk
2011	Laura Jung	Aleksandra Zapekina	Christina Chernischew
2012			
2013	Jana Berezko-Marggrander	Laura Jung	Darja Sajfutdinova
2014	Jana Berezko-Marggrander	Laura Jung	Darja Sajfutdinova
2015	Jana Berezko-Marggrander	Laura Jung	Alessia Ceconi
2016	Jana Berezko-Marggrander	Laura Jung	Alina Diakov
2017	Julia Stavickaja	Lea Tkaltschewitsch	Viktoria Burjak
2018	Lea Tkaltschewitsch	Julia Stavickaja	Noemi Peschel
2019	Emeli Erbes	Jule Scheffer	Marlene Kriebel
2020	cancelled due to Covid-19		
2021	Margarita Kolosov	Melanie Dargel	Julia Stavickaja
2022	Margarita Kolosov	Malvina Chakyr	Darja Varfolomeev
2023	Darja Varfolomeev	Margarita Kolosov	Melanie Dargel
2024	Darja Varfolomeev	Margarita Kolosov	Viktoria Steinfeld
2025	Darja Varfolomeev	Anastasia Simakova	Margarita Kolosov
2026	Viktoria Steinfeld	Lada Pusch	Darja Varfolomeev
