= Alina Ott =

German rhythmic gymnast (born 2009)

- Born: 7 November 2009 (age 16) Nuremberg

Gymnastics career
- Discipline: Rhythmic gymnastics
- Country represented: Germany; (2022-present)
- Club: TSV Nürnberg
- Head coach: Camilla Pfeffer
- Assistant coach: Camilla Patriarca
- Former coaches: Adila Mamedova, Christina Frank
- Choreographer: Gocha Budagashvili
Medal record
Rhythmic Gymnastics
Event	1st	2nd	3rd
FIG World Cup	0	2	0
FIG World Challenge Cup	1	3	0
Total	1	5	0

Alina Ott (born 7 November 2009) is a German rhythmic gymnast. She represents Germany in international competitions as part of the senior group.

== Career ==
Ott took up the sport the age of two and a half after seeing a gymnast on TV.

=== Junior ===
In May 2022 she won silver in the All-Around and with ball, as well as gold with ribbon at the German Youth Championships. After these results she was included in the selection process for the European Championships in Tel Aviv.

She took 4th place in the German qualification for the 2023 European Championships in Baku, not being selected for the competition.

In 2024 she won gold in the all-around, and with hoop, with clubs and with ribbon as well as silver, behind Olivia Falk, with ball at the German Championships. She was then selected to perform with clubs at the 2024 European Championships in Budapest, Hungary, placing 9th with the apparatus and 12th in teams along Olivia Falk and Victoria Magel.

=== Senior ===
She became age eligible for senior competitions in 2025. In April she won gold in the All-Around and in the four event finals at the Bavarian Championships. In June she took part in the German Youth Championships, earning a spot for nationals. Two months later, she competed at her first senior German Championships and placed 6th in all-around, 6th with hoop, 7th with ball, 6th with clubs and 6th with ribbon. In early December she was selected to integrate the national senior group for the following season.

In 2026, the group started its season at the World Cup in Sofia, winning silver in the All-Around. They were 5th with 5 balls and 4th in the 3 hoops + 4 clubs final. At the World Challenge Cup in Portimão she won silver in the All-Around and with 5 balls as well as gold with 3 hoops & 4 clubs. In the end of May, Ott and her teammates competed at the 2026 European Championships in Varna, Bulgaria, where they placed 5th in all-around. They took 5th place in team competition together with individuals and 6th place in 3 hoops + 4 clubs due to loss of apparatus. In Cluj-Napoca they won silver in the All-Around. In July, they competed at the World Cup Milan and ended in 10th place in the all-around and won silver medal in 3 hoops + 4 clubs final. In August, she was selected to compete alongside Alisa Datsenko, Anja Kosan, Helena Ripken and Anna-Maria Shatokhin at the 2026 World Championships in Frankfurt. They took 4th place in group all-around and 4th place in team competition alongside Varfolomeev, Pusch and Simakova. They qualified to both apparatus finals, finishing 6th in 3 hoops + 4 clubs and 8th in 5 balls.
