= Dara Sajfutdinova =

German rhythmic gymnast

Darja Sajfutdinova
- Born: 3 May 1997 (age 29) Novosibirsk, Russia

Gymnastics career
- Discipline: Rhythmic gymnastics
- Country represented: Germany (2011-2015)
- Club: TSV Schmiden
- Head coaches: Natalia Stsiapanava, Ekaterina Kotelikova
- Retired: yes

Darja Sajfutdinova (born 3 May 1997) is a former German rhythmic gymnast of Russian descent. Sajfutdinova trained from 2011 to at the federal base in Fellbach and is a member of TSV Schmiden. She currently works as a coach in Berlin at Karolina Raskina school.

== Career ==
=== Junior ===
Competing for TV Wattenscheid 01 RSG, Sajfutdinova took part in the German junior championships for the first time in 2010 and was second in the All-Around. She also placed 2nd in the rope and ball apparatus finals and 3rd with clubs, she became German junior champion with hoop.

In 2011 Sajfutdinova was initially part of the junior group of the RSG Rhein Ruhr, which won the national qualification for the European Junior Championships, but was then replaced by Lea Godejohann from Schwerin. In the summer of 2011, Darja then moved from Bochum-Wattenscheid to the federal base in Fellbach near Stuttgart.

=== Senior ===
Since 2013, Sajfutdinova has competed in seniors and was able to win the bronze medal in her first German championship in the All-Around and in the apparatus finals with ball and ribbon. She was also 4th with clubs and 2nd hoop. She competed at the World Cup tournament in Pesaro, Italy, where she finished 33rd. At the Berlin Masters, which is a competition in the Grand Prix series, she came in 17th.

In March 2014 Sajfutdinova took part in the World Cup in Stuttgart, since only two gymnasts per country are allowed to start at World Cup tournaments and these places were taken by Jana Berezko-Marggrander and Laura Jung, she performed out of competition. Two weeks later she finished 25th at the World Cup in Lisbon. At the German Championships in Halle, Darja, like the year before, was 3rd in the All-Around, ball and ribbon, 7th with clubs and 4th with hoop. At the World Cup in Sofia in August, Sajfutdinova debuted as a member of the national group with Judith Hauser, Anastasija Khmelnytska, Daniela Potapova and Rana Tokmak, and finished 9th in the All-Around and 7th in the 10 clubs' final and 8th with 3 balls + 2 ribbons. Like the previous year, the group finished the 2014 World Championships in İzmir in 9th place in the All-Around, 10th with 3 ribbons + 2 balls and 7th place with 10 clubs.

In 2015, the group missed direct Olympic qualification at the World Championships. Due to hip problems, Sajfutdinova was unable to compete in the decisive Olympic qualification in early 2016 and then ended her career.
