= Alisa Datsenko =

German rhythmic gymnast

- Born: 8 February 2010 (age 16) Mannheim
- Height: 1.54 m (5 ft 1 in)

Gymnastics career
- Discipline: Rhythmic gymnastics
- Country represented: Germany; (2022-)
- Club: TSV Schmiden
- Head coach: Camilla Pfeffer
- Assistant coach: Camilla Patriarca
- Former coach: Magdalena Brzeska
- Choreographer: Gocha Budagashvili
Medal record
Rhythmic Gymnastics
Event	1st	2nd	3rd
FIG World Challenge Cup	1	3	0
Total	1	3	0

Alisa Datsenko (born 8 February 2010) is a German rhythmic gymnast. She represents Germany as part of the senior group.

== Career ==
In 2022 Datsenko was 4th in the All-Around and won silver with ball and gold with clubs at nationals. In September she moved to the federal training base in Fellbach.

=== Junior ===
In May 2024 she competed in the Gdynia Rhythmic Stars, winning bronze in the All-Around behind Natalie de la Rosa and Isabella Chong. In September she was selected for the AEON Cup in Tokyo along Lada Pusch and Anastasia Simakova, being 6th in teams. The next month she took part in the Bundesliga with Eintracht Frankfurt, winning bronze in the end.

The following year she started her season at the Gymnastik International tournament in Schmiden. In June she was selected to perform with clubs and ribbon at the 3rd Junior World Championships in Sofia, being 14th and 8th with the apparatuses and 8th in teams along Aleksija Kalajdzic, Olivia Misterek and the national junior group. She then helped TSV Schmiden to win their 4th cosecutive Bundesliga.

=== Senior ===
Datsenko became age eligible for senior competitions in 2026, being included into the national senior group. In late April it was revealed she was selected for the European Championships in Varna. She made her debut as a starter at the World Challenge Cup in Portimão, where she won silver in the All-Around and with 5 balls as well as gold with 3 hoops & 4 clubs. In the end of May, Datsenko and her teammates competed at the 2026 European Championships in Varna, Bulgaria, where they placed 5th in all-around. They took 5th place in team competition together with individuals and 6th place in 3 hoops + 4 clubs due to loss of apparatus. In June, they won silver in the all-around and 5 balls final at World Challenge Cup in Cluj-Napoca. They finished fourth in 3 hoops + 4 clubs final. In July, they competed at the World Cup Milan and ended in 10th place in the all-around and won silver medal in 3 hoops + 4 clubs final. In August, she was selected to compete alongside Helena Ripken, Alina Ott, Anja Kosan and Anna-Maria Shatokhin at the 2026 World Championships in Frankfurt. They took 4th place in group all-around and 4th place in team competition alongside Varfolomeev, Pusch and Simakova. They qualified to both apparatus finals, finishing 6th in 3 hoops + 4 clubs and 8th in 5 balls.
