= Viktoria Steinfeld =

German rhythmic gymnast (born 2008)

- Born: 9 July 2008 (age 18)

Gymnastics career
- Discipline: Rhythmic gymnastics
- Country represented: Germany; (2022–present)
- Club: TSV Schmiden
- Gym: Bundesstützpunkt Schmiden
- Head coaches: Natalya Raskina,Yulia Raskina
Medal record
Rhythmic Gymnastics
Representing Germany
Event	1st	2nd	3rd
FIG World Cup	0	0	1
Total	0	0	1

Viktoria Steinfeld (born 9 July 2008) is a German rhythmic gymnast. She represents Germany in international competitions. On national level, she is the 2025 German all-around bronze medalist.

== Career ==
=== Junior ===
In 2022, Steinfeld competed in the first national qualifier for the European Championships in Tel Aviv. She was third in the all-around behind Lada Pusch and Anna-Maria Shatokhin. In April, at the second event, she was again third after Shatokhin and Pusch. She competed at Irina Deleanu Cup in Romania, taking 5th place in all-around. A month later, she won gold at nationals among the girls born in 2008, taking gold also with clubs, silver with ball and ribbon and bronze with hoop.

Taking part in the 2023 Gymnastik International, she won gold in teams (with Pusch) and was 5th in the clubs' final. In May, she was the national runner-up in the All-Around. She was then selected to participate in the Junior World Championships, but an injury forced her to withdraw.

=== Senior ===
She turned senior in 2024, debuting at the Gymnastik International. In May, she won bronze with clubs and with ribbon at the Portimão Tournament. At the German Championships she was 5th in the All-Around and won bronze with ribbon. Weeks later she made her World Cup debut in Milan, being 27th in the All-Around, 24th with hoop, 31st with ball, 17th with clubs and 34th with ribbon. In June she was third, behind Darja Varfolomeev and Margarita Kolosov, in the qualification for the Olympic Games, thus earning the substitute spot. In November, she helped TSV Schminden to retain their German national club title.

In 2025, she started her season at the Gymnastik International, placing 5th. At the World Cup in Sofia, she placed 24th place overall. At the World Cup in Baku, she was 15th in the all-around, with her best result being 11th with clubs. In May, she was named as the substitute gymnast for the European Championships in Tallinn. She then competed at the World Challenge Cup Portimão, finishing 22nd overall, 13th with hoop, 18th with clubs and 46th with ribbon. In the ball final, she won her first medal in the World Cup series by taking bronze behind Alina Harnasko and Rin Keys. In July, she competed at the World Cup Milan and took 7th place in ball final. At the 2025 German National Championships, she won the bronze medal in the all-around behind Darja Varfolomeev and Anastasia Simakova. In the apparatus finals, she won silver medals with ball and with hoop.

In 2026, she started her competition season at the Tashkent World Cup and took 26th place in the all-around. Then she competed at Portimão World Challenge Cup and took 13th place in the all-around. She qualified to the ribbon final, finishing 6th. At the end of May, she represented Germany alongside teammates Darja Varfolomeev and Lada Pusch at the 2026 European Championships in Varna, Bulgaria. Together with the senior group, they took 5th place in the team competition. Steinfield finished in 21st place all-around qualifications and did not advance into the all-around final. She qualified to the ribbon final, finishing 8th.

In June, she placed 21st at the World Challenge Cup Cluj-Napoca. In July, she took 26th place in the all-around at the Milan World Cup. Later in July, she finished fifth in the all-around behind Margarita Kolosov at the 2026 German national championships. In the apparatus finals, she won gold with ribbon, silver with clubs and bronze with hoop.

== Routine music information ==
Year	Apparatus	Music title
2026	Hoop	Prodigy by Nathan Lanier
2026	Ball	Black Friday by Tom Odell
2026	Clubs	CORAÇAO by Jerry Ropero, Hugel, Mijangos, Jesus Fernandez
2026	Ribbon	Experience by Ludovico Einaudi, Daniel Hope
2025	Hoop	Fearsome Flight by Cirque du Soleil
2025	Ball	Vampire by Olivia Rodrigo
2025	Clubs	Puttin' on the Ritz (Jazzy Radio Mix) by Taco feat. tomX, Hit the Road Jack by Throttle
2025	Ribbon	Experience by Ludovico Einaudi, Daniel Hope
