= Anna Shenenko =

German rhythmic gymnast (born 2006)

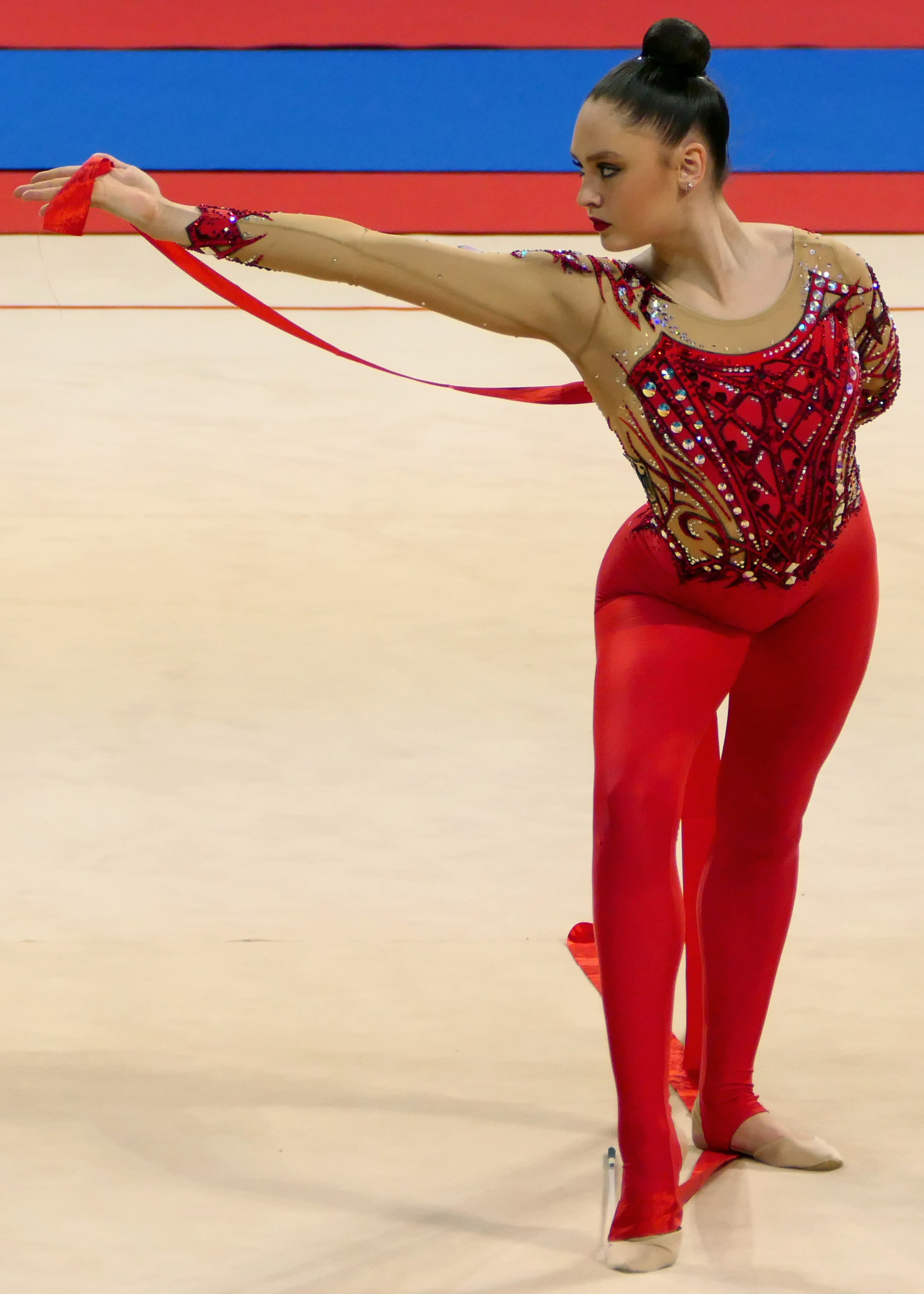
- Shenenko in 2024

Personal information
- Born: 15 March 2006 (age 20) Düsseldorf
- Height: 168 cm (5 ft 6 in)

Gymnastics career
- Discipline: Rhythmic gymnastics
- Country represented: Germany (2019-)
- Club: TSV Bayer 04 Leverkusen
- Head coaches: Ariel Milanesio, Barbara Klima

Anna Shenenko (born 15 March 2006) is a German rhythmic gymnast of Ukrainian descent. She represents Germany in international competitions.

== Personal life ==
Shenenko originally participated in figure skating. She took up rhythmic gymnastics after her parents were recommended it by her aunt, a trainer in Ukraine, to maintain her flexibility during the off ice skating off season. She has a twin brother.

== Career ==
=== Junior ===
In 2016, Shenenko won silver behind Hannah Vester at the national championships in the 10-year-old category. The following year, she was crowned national champion among 11-year-olds. In 2019, she took silver behind Darja Varfolomeev at the national championships among gymnast born in 2006. Later in the year, she made her international debut at the Luxembourg Trophy, where she was 6th among juniors.

Before the 2020 season was cut short due to the COVID-19 outbreak, she took 2nd place during the qualification for the European Championships in Kyiv during the Gymnastik International; Germany did not attend the Championships due to the pandemic. At the Schmiden International, she was 6th with rope, 8th with clubs, 5th with ribbon and won bronze in teams along with her teammates, Darja Varfolomeev, Niki Gocheva, and Melanie Dargel.

In October 2021, she competed in the Spanish Club Championships for Calpe, helping them take 13th place by finishing 5th in the freehand event. In October, she relocated to the national training centre in Fellbach. In December, she won the title of the German Bundesliga with her club TSV Bayer 04 Leverkusen.

=== Senior ===
Shenenko became age eligible for senior competitions in 2022. In early April, she took part in the Sofia Cup, finishing 6th overall, 8th with hoop, 6th with ball, 4th with clubs and 5th with ribbon. After that, she participated in the qualifications for the European Championships in Tel Aviv, but she was not selected. The following month, she qualified for the German Championships. At the Championships, held in Berlin, she was 6th in the all-around, 6th with hoop, 6th with ball and 4th with ribbon. In August, she was 5th at the internal selection event for the World Championships in Sofia.

She started her 2023 season at the Gymnastik International and placed 8th overall. In May, she competed at the Ritam Cup in Belgrade. In July she won the all-around bronze at the German Championships, behind Darja Varfolomeev and Margarita Kolosov, and won a second bronze in the hoop final.

In 2024, she placed 8th in the all-around, 6th with ball and 7th with clubs at Miss Valentine in Tartu. In March, she performed at the Aphrodite Cup in Athens. In April, she made her World Cup debut in Sofia, where she was 31st in the all-around, 29th with hoop, 39th with ball, 34th with clubs and 29th with ribbon.

== Routine music information ==
Year	Apparatus	Music title
2024	Hoop	
2024	Ball	Run This Town by Jay-Z feat. Rihanna & Kanye West
2024	Clubs	Witch by Apashe & Alina Pash
2024	Ribbon	
