= Olivia Falk =

German rhythmic gymnast (born 2009)

- Born: 29 September 2009 (age 17)

Gymnastics career
- Discipline: Rhythmic gymnastics
- Country represented: Germany; (2022-)
- Club: TSV Schmiden
- Head coach: Camilla Pfeffer
- Assistant coach: Camilla Patriarca
- Former coach: Olga Lobas
- Choreographer: Gocha Budagashvili
Medal record
Rhythmic Gymnastics
Event	1st	2nd	3rd
FIG World Cup	0	1	0
Total	0	1	0
World Championships
Gold medal – first place	2025 Rio de Janeiro	Team
European Championships
Bronze medal – third place	2025 Tallinn	3 Balls + 2 Hoops

Olivia Falk (born 29 September 2009) is a German rhythmic gymnast. She represents Germany as part of the senior group.

== Biography ==
=== Junior ===
In September 2022 Falk moved to the federal training base in Schmiden, thus entering the national team. The following year she joined the junior national group, being selected for the 2023 European Championships in Baku, Azerbaijan, (along with Emily Dik, Raya Dudeva, Eirini Gagas Obiol, Lisa Tenenbaum and Zane Viksna) where Germany was 5th in the group all-Around, 8th with 5 balls and 5th with 5 ropes. At the 2023 Junior World Championships in Cluj-Napoca, Romania, the group took 23rd place in all-around and didn't qualify to apparatus finals.

In 2024 she switched back to the individual modality, winning silver in the all-Around, bronze with clubs and gold with ball at the German Championships. She was then selected to perform with ribbon at the 2024 European Championships in Budapest, Hungary, placing 15th with the apparatus and 12th in teams along Alina Ott and Victoria Magel.

=== Senior ===
Olivia became a senior in 2025, entering the new German senior group, debuting at the Gymnastik International, winning gold in the All-Around and with 5 ribbons. At the World Cup in Baku where Germany was 10th in the All-Around, 12th with 5 ribbon and 7th with 3 balls & 2 hoops. A week later, in Tashkent, they took 4th place overall, 5th with 5 ribbons and 7th in the mixed event. She was then selected for the European Championships in Tallinn, there the group was 10th in the All-Around and won an historical bronze medal, the first ever in the competition for a German group, with 3 balls & 2 hoops. In August, Falk made her senior World Championships debut in Rio de Janeiro, Brazil, alongside Melanie Dargel, Anja Kosan, Helena Ripken, Anna-Maria Shatokhin and Emilia Wickert, where they took 8th place in all-around. Together with Darja Varfolomeev and Anastasia Simakova, they won the gold medal in team competition.

In 2026 the group started its season at the World Cup in Sofia, winning silver in the all-around. They were 5th in 5 balls and 4th in 3 hoops + 4 clubs final.
