= Helena Ripken =

German rhythmic gymnast (born 2006)

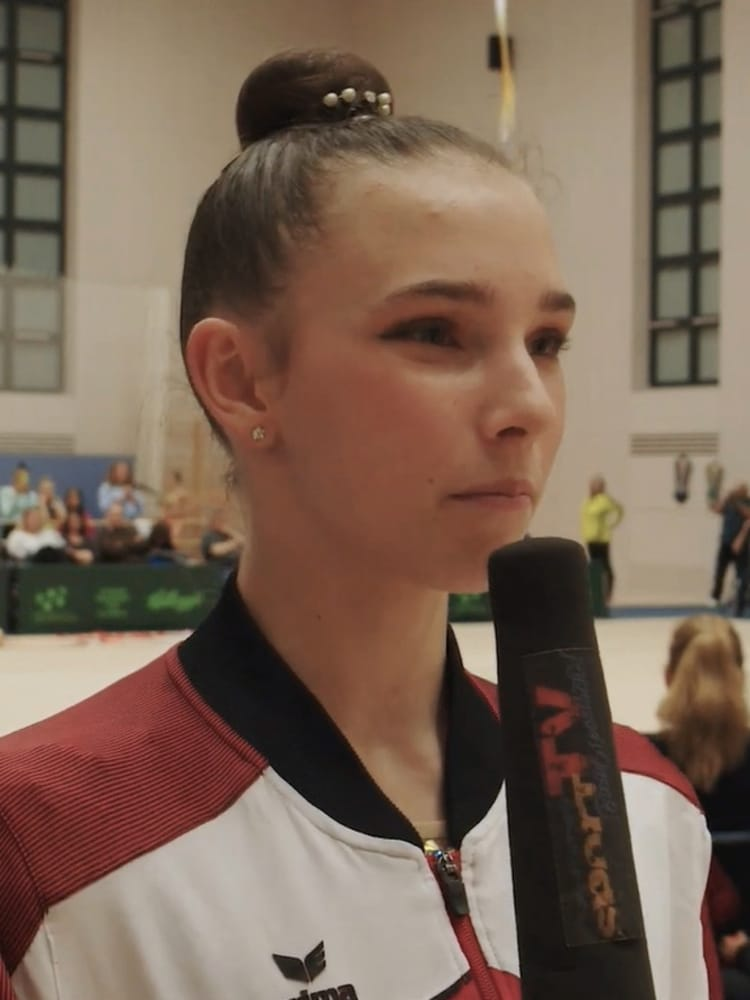
- Born: 18 July 2006 (age 20) Berlin

Gymnastics career
- Discipline: Rhythmic gymnastics
- Country represented: Germany; (2022-)
- Club: Berliner TSC
- Head coach: Camilla Pfeffer
- Assistant coach: Camilla Patriarca
- Former coach: Anzhelika Lepekha
- Choreographer: Gocha Budagashvili
Medal record
Rhythmic Gymnastics
Representing Germany
Event	1st	2nd	3rd
FIG World Cup	0	1	0
FIG World Challenge Cup	1	3	0
Total	1	4	0
World Championships
Gold medal – first place	2025 Rio de Janeiro	Team
European Championships
Bronze medal – third place	2025 Tallinn	3 Balls + 2 Hoops

Helena Ripken (born 18 July 2006) is a German rhythmic gymnast. She represents Germany as part of the senior group.

== Biography ==
In June 2018 Ripken won bronze among 12 years old gymnasts behind Hannah Vester and Anna Schenenko. The following she won bronze, behind Darja Varfolomeev and Schenenko, at the German Championships in the 2006 botn juniors category.

In November 2021 she participated in the Children's Gymnastics Day in Hamburg. In December she helped Berlin TSC take silver in the first ever German club championship.

=== Senior ===
In 2022 she took part in the qualifications for the European Championships, being 5th in the first and 3rd in the second competition. In May Helena made her World Cup debut in Portimão, being 24th in the All-Around, 35th with hoop, 34th with ball, 23rd with clubs and 11th with ribbon. In June she competed in the stage in Pesaro, finishing 23rd overall, 23rd with hoop, 25th with ball, 24th with clubs and 17th with ribbon. She then was 4th in the All-Around, 4th with clubs, 5th with ribbon, and won bronze with hoop and ball at nationals. In August she came in 6th place in the second stage of the qualification for the World Championships.

Ripken moved to Fellbach in 2024 to join the national senior group. In 2025 she became a starter in the group, debuting at the Gymnastik International, winning gold in the All-Around and with 5 ribbons. Then she competed the World Cup in Baku where Germany was 10th in the All-Around, 12th with 5 ribbon and 7th with 3 balls & 2 hoops. A week later, in Tashkent, they took 4th place overall, 5th with 5 ribbons and 7th in the mixed event. She was then selected for the European Championships in Tallinn, there the group was 10th in the All-Around and won an historical bronze medal, the first ever in the competition for a German group, with 3 balls & 2 hoops. In August, Ripken made her senior World Championships debut in Rio de Janeiro, Brazil, alongside Melanie Dargel, Anja Kosan, Olivia Falk, Anna-Maria Shatokhin and Emilia Wickert, where they took 8th place in all-around. Together with Darja Varfolomeev and Anastasia Simakova, they won the gold medal in team competition.

In 2026 the group started its season at the World Cup in Sofia, winning silver in the all-around. They were 5th in 5 balls and 4th in 3 hoops + 4 clubs final. At the World Challenge Cup in Portimão she won silver in the All-Around and with 5 balls as well as gold with 3 hoops & 4 clubs. In the end of May, Ripken and her teammates competed at the 2026 European Championships in Varna, Bulgaria, where they placed 5th in all-around. They took 5th place in team competition together with individuals and 6th place in 3 hoops + 4 clubs due to loss of apparatus. In June, they won silver in the all-around and 5 balls final at World Challenge Cup in Cluj-Napoca. They finished fourth in 3 hoops + 4 clubs final. In July, they competed at the World Cup Milan and ended in 10th place in the all-around and won silver medal in 3 hoops + 4 clubs final. In August, she was selected to compete alongside Alisa Datsenko, Alina Ott, Anja Kosan and Anna-Maria Shatokhin at the 2026 World Championships in Frankfurt. They took 4th place in group all-around and 4th place in team competition alongside Varfolomeev, Pusch and Simakova. They qualified to both apparatus finals, finishing 6th in 3 hoops + 4 clubs and 8th in 5 balls.
