= Anke Abraham =

German rhythmic gymnast, sport scientist and sociologist

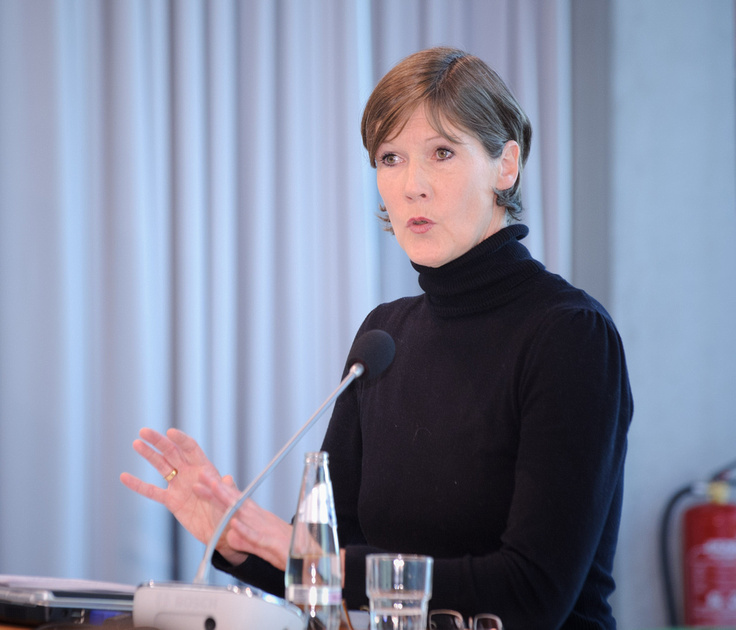
- Born: 12 May 1960; Lüneburg, Germany
- Died: 28 April 2017 (aged 56); Marburg, Germany
- Education: German Sport University Cologne
- Occupations: Rhythmic gymnast, sport scientist, sociologist
- Years active: Gymnast (1979-1981) Professor (2004-2017?)
- Employer: Marburg University
- Height: 170 cm (5 ft 7 in)
- Spouse: Michael Klein

Anke Abraham (12 May 1960 - 28 April 2017) was a German rhythmic gymnast, sport scientist and sociologist. From 2004 she was also a professor at the Marburg University.

== Biography ==
Since her childhood Anke trained in rhythmic gymnastics at MTV Treubund Lüneburg from 1972 to 1982 under Livia Medilanski. In 1976 she won the German junior Championship with the Lüneburg group and achieved the same success among seniors in 1978, while graduating from Wilhelm-Raabe school.

From 1979 she studied sports science as well as German, sociology and pedagogy at the German Sport University in Cologne with the aim of becoming a teacher. In 1984 she completed her studies with a diploma thesis on “Identity Constitutions in Rhythmic Gymnastics”, for which she received an award from the International Committee for Sociology of Sport (now the International Sociology of Sport Association).

In 1980 she became German individual All-Around champion for the first time. From 1970 to 1981 she was part of the national team and competing in European and World Championships, taking 27th place in 1981.

After ending her sport career she became a dancer and choreographer with "Maja Lex". While she was still studying at the Cologne Sports University, she was accepted as a member by the then head of the university's internal dance group, Graziela Padilla. In the fall of 1988, the ensemble separated from the sports university and went on its first tour through southern Germany. From 1989 to 1993 Abraham was the artistic director of the ensemble. As a choreographer, she created three pieces for the ensemble: the sextet Concerto Grosso (1988, choreography for six dancers in four movements, based on Arcangelo Corelli's Concerto grosso, C minor), the quintet Sedianka - evening meeting (1989, to the music of Mystère des Voix Bulgares) and Maigesang (1990). She appeared as a dancer as well as in her own choreographies and other pieces. In 1989 Abraham's Concerto Grosso achieved third place in the Hanover Ballet Society's choreographic competition. In addition to national appearances, “Maja Lex” also gave guest performances in Paris, Kharkiv and Atlanta, among others. In 1990, as a national selection at the international choreography competition “Rencontres chorégraphiques Auslands de Seine-Saint-Denis”, they performed the piece Sedianka - evening meeting and received a special mention from the jury in the area of interpretation. At the end of the 1991/1992 season, Abraham left the ensemble for health and financial reasons and ended her career as a dancer.

In 1991 Abraham received her doctorate with the distinction “Summa cum laude” from the University of Oldenburg. Her dissertation dealt with the topic of women, bodies, illness, art: the process of splitting experience and the problem of women becoming subjects, presented using the example of rhythmic gymnastics. From 1993 to 1997 she worked as a research assistant at the Erfurt University of Education. She completed her habilitation in sociology at the University of Dortmund in 2001, with the habilitation thesis “The body in a biographical context”, and in sports science in Erfurt in 2004. From April 2004 she held the C3 professorship “Psychology of Movement” at the Institute for Sports Science and Motology in the Department of Educational Sciences at the Philipps University of Marburg. Most recently, she was also Vice Dean of the Department of Educational Sciences and Academic Director of the continuing education master's degree in cultural education in schools in Marburg.

The focus of her research work was in the area of sociology of the body. She considered physicality and movement (often sports and dance) in developmental, biographical and gender-related contexts. She was also involved in health promotion and was a qualified concentrative movement therapist.

Anke Abraham was married to the sociologist Michael Klein, with whom she also worked for a time. She died in 2017 at the age of 56 after a serious illness.
