= Noemi Peschel =

German rhythmic gymnast

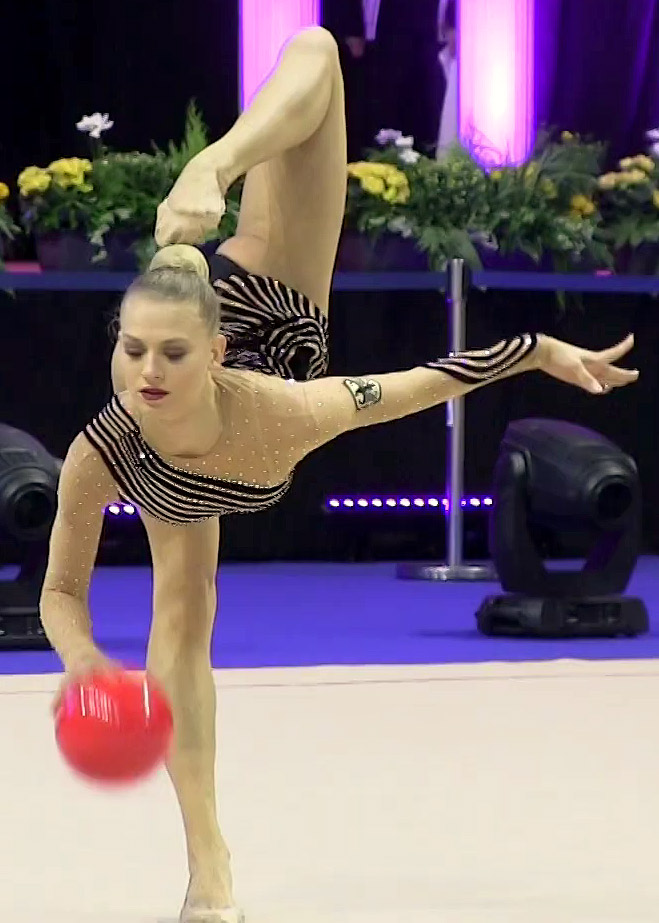
- Peschel in 2017

Personal information
- Born: 24 November 2001 (age 24) Bochum, Germany

Gymnastics career
- Discipline: Rhythmic gymnastics
- Country represented: Germany (2015-2021)
- Head coach: Camilla Pfeffer

Noemi Peschel (born 24 November 2001) is a former German rhythmic gymnast of Polish descent.

== Personal life ==
Noemi Peschel is the younger daughter of Magdalena Brzeska, also a member of the German national rhythmic gymnastics team, and former footballer Peter Peschel.

== Career ==
=== Junior ===
At the 2015 European Championships in Minsk, she finished fifth in the all-around and in the 5 ball's final with the German junior group. In 2016, she competed as an individual at the Junior European Championships with ball and clubs and finished ninth in the team classification together with Lea Tkaltschewitsch and Daniela Huber.

=== Senior ===
Since 2017, Peschel competed in the senior category and was 51st here at the European Championships in Budapest. She finished in 36th place at the World Championships, finishing 70th the following year. At the German Championships in 2019 she became German runner-up champion in the All-Around and with ball and third with hoop, clubs and ribbon.

From 2019 to 2021, Peschel was a member of the German rhythmic gymnastics National Team, with whom she finished 15th in the all-around at the 2019 World Championship. At the end of 2021, Noemi Peschel ended her career as a gymnast due to chronic injuries.
