= Edita Schaufler =

German rhythmic gymnast

- Born: 11 July 1980 (age 46) Frunze, Kirghiz SSR, Soviet Union
- Height: 166 cm (5 ft 5 in)

Gymnastics career
- Discipline: Rhythmic gymnastics
- Country represented: Germany
- Club: TV Wattenscheid 01
- Assistant coaches: Livia Medilanski, Fernando Cortiso
- Retired: 2000
Medal record
Representing Germany
Rhythmic Gymnastics
European Championships
Bronze medal – third place	2000 Zaragoza	Team
Grand Prix Final
Bronze medal – third place	1997 Deventer	All-around

Edita Schaufler (born 11 July 1980) is a German retired individual rhythmic gymnast.

== Biography ==
Schaufler was born in Frunze in Kirghiz SSR, she started training gymnastics in 1988 at 7 years of age. Schaufler and her family later permanently moved to Germany under Germany's repatriation program for Germans from the Soviet Union.

Schaufler trained under coach Livia Medilanski with fellow rhythmic gymnasts Lena Asmus and Monique Strobel at the club TV Wattenscheid 01. Her international career took off in 1996 becoming Germany's No.2 gymnast after Magdalena Brzeska. She won a bronze with the German team at the 1998 World Cup in Bochum. Schaufler's career highlight was a bronze medal win in the all-around at the 1997 Grand Prix Final.

She competed in her first Worlds at the 1997 World Championships. At the 1999 World Championships in Osaka, Schaufler together with Asmus and Strobel, earned Germany's highest placement in the Team event finishing in 4th overall behind Ukraine. She also qualified for the hoop finals finishing in 8th place.

Schaufler represented Germany at the 2000 Summer Olympics in Sydney, placing 12th in the All-around qualifications. She completed her career after the Olympics.

After her retirement in 2000, Schaufler began coaching, receiving national and international C & B coaching license in Germany. In 2005, Schaufler completed a 2 1/2-year course in part-time business studies at the FOM University of Applied Sciences in Essen, Germany. Schaufler speaks German, Russian, and French.
