= Aleksandra Zapekina =

German rhythmic gymnast (born 1991)

- Born: 9 May 1991 (age 35)

Gymnastics career
- Discipline: Rhythmic gymnastics
- Country represented: Germany; (2006- 2014)
- Club: Bremen 1860
- Head coach: Larissa Drygala
- Retired: yes

Aleksandra Zapekina (born 9 May 1991) is a German retired rhythmic gymnast. She represented her country in international competitions.

== Career ==
Aleksandra was trained by Larissa Drygala at Bremen 1860 and in the national training center in Bremen. In 2006 she won silver in the All-Around and gold with rope and clubs in the junior division of the German Championships. In the same year she was selected for the 2006 European Championships in Moscow, taking 10th place in teams and 9th with rope.

In 2007 she won bronze in the All-Around and silver with rope at the German Championships. The following year she retained her national All-Around bronze medal, adding another 3rd place with rope. In 2010 she was crowned national All-Around champion and won silver in all event finals. In 2011 she was the national All-Around runner-up, also winning silver with hoop, ball and ribbon, as well as bronze with clubs. From 2011 to 2013 she also completed a coaching internship in her childhood club.

In 2013 Zapekina won a bronze with clubs at the German Championships. The following year she was 4th in the All-Around at nationals and won bronze in the hoop final. After her career ended she became a trainer at Bremen 1860.
