= Nicole Gerdes =

German rhythmic gymnast (born 1976)

- Born: 1976 (age 49–50) Bremen, Germany
- Spouse: Stephan Gerdes

Gymnastics career
- Discipline: Rhythmic gymnastics
- Country represented: Germany; (1993-1998)
- Club: Blumenthaler TV / SV Werder Bremen
- Retired: yes

Nicole Gerdes (born 1976) is a retired German rhythmic gymnast. She represented her country in international competitions.

== Career ==
Gerdes took up the sport at the club Blumenthaler SV. At the 1993 German Gymnastics Championships in Bremen, she was the runner-up behind Magdalena Brzeska in the rope and hoop finals, and she won bronze in the all-around and the clubs and ball finals. In November she was 24th in the all-around at the World Championships in Alicante.

In 1994 she won the German national title with rope. She also won four silver medals with ribbon, clubs and hoops and the all-around. The following year, competing for SV Werder Bremen, she came second with ribbon and rope and again reached third place in the ball and club finals.

In 1992 and 1993 she was Bremen's Sportswoman of the Year. After her retirement in 1998, she embarked on a coaching career at Blumenthaler TV. She was also part of Blumenthaler's gymnastics and dance group, until they had to disband in 2023. She is now married and had a child in 2010.
