= Melanie Dargel =

German rhythmic gymnast

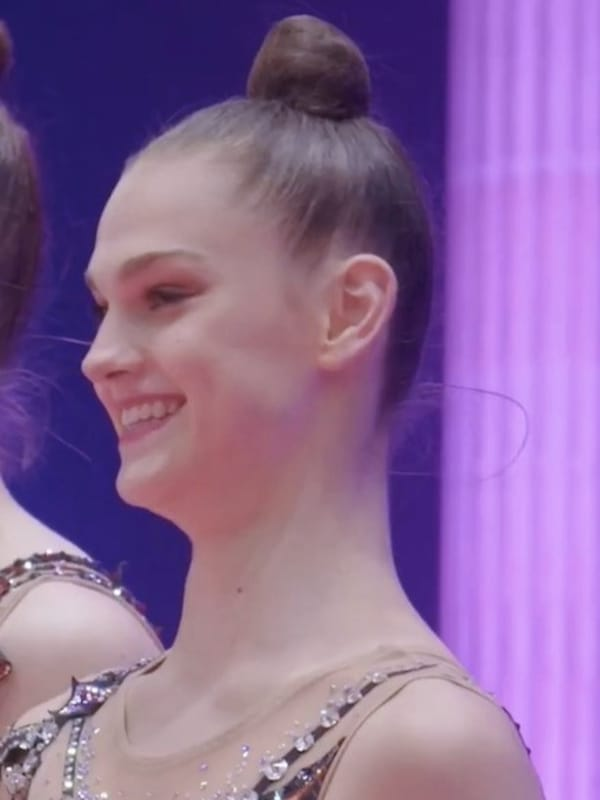
- Born: 16 September 2005 (age 20) Euskirchen, Germany

Gymnastics career
- Discipline: Rhythmic gymnastics
- Country represented: Germany (2021-)
- Club: TG Worms
- Head coach: Camilla Pfeffer
- Former coach: Yulia Raskina
- Choreographer: Gocha Budagashvili
Medal record
Rhythmic Gymnastics
Representing Germany
Event	1st	2nd	3rd
FIG World Cup	0	0	1
Total	0	0	1
World Championships
Gold medal – first place	2025 Rio de Janeiro	Team
European Championships
Bronze medal – third place	2025 Tallinn	3 Balls + 2 Hoops

Melanie Dargel (born 16 September 2005) is a German rhythmic gymnast. She represents her country in international competitions.

== Career ==
Dargel debuted at the 2021 European Championships in Varna, 36th in the All-Around, 32nd with hoop, 35th ball, 40th with clubs and 28th with ribbon. In 2022 she competed at the World Cup in Athens, finishing 8th in the All-Around, 8th ball, 10th with clubs and 8th with ribbon winning bronze with hoop. In April she was present at the stage in Sofia being 8th in the All-Around, 11th with hoop, 8th ball, 23rd with clubs and 16th with ribbon. She was then selected for the 2022 European Championships in Tel Aviv, taking 79th place with clubs and 5th place in teams along Margarita Kolosov, Darja Varfolomeev and the senior group.

In 2025, after the retirement of some German national group members, she switch from individual to group. At the 2025 European Championships in Tallinn, Dargel and the German group placed 10th in the all-around and won bronze medail in 3 balls + 2 hoops final. In August, Dargel made her senior World Championships debut in Rio de Janeiro, Brazil, alongside Olivia Falk, Anja Kosan, Helena Ripken, Anna-Maria Shatokhin and Emilia Wickert, where they took 8th place in all-around. Together with Darja Varfolomeev and Anastasia Simakova, they won the gold medal in team competition.

== Routine music information ==
Year	Apparatus	Music title
2022	Hoop	Rise of the Instruments by HAVASI
2022	Ball	Salut by Hélène Ségara & Joe Dassin
2022	Clubs	Un dos tres Maria by Blue Cat Label
2022	Ribbon	Shake Shake by Nessi
2021	Hoop	Rise of the Instruments by HAVASI
2021	Ball	Salut by Hélène Ségara & Joe Dassin
2021	Clubs	African Dream by Zumba Fitness
2021	Ribbon	Glam (Electro-Swing Remix) by Dimie Cat
