= 2000 European Rhythmic Gymnastics Championships =

2000 Rhythmic Gymnastics European Championships
- Location: Zaragoza, Spain
- Start date: 1 June 2000
- End date: 4 June 2000

The 16th Rhythmic Gymnastics European Championships were held in Zaragoza, Spain from 1 June to 4 June 2000.

After the European Championships, the International Gymnastics Federation suspended six judges for discriminating against a Ukrainian gymnast, Olena Vitrychenko. The following judges were found guilty: Irina Deryugina (Ukraine), Natalya Stepanova (Belarus), Gabriela Shtumer (Austria), Galina Margina (Latvia), Natalya Ladzinskaya (Russia) and Ursula Zolenkamp (Germany). Olena Vitrychenko left the competition on the second day in sign of protestation.

== Medal winners ==
Event	Gold	Silver	Bronze
Team Competition
Team	Russia; Alina Kabaeva; Yulia Barsukova...	Belarus; Yulia Raskina; Valeria Vatkina...	Germany; Edita Schaufler; Lena Asmus...
Senior Individual
All-Around	Alina Kabaeva; Russia	Yulia Raskina; Belarus	Yulia Barsukova; Russia
Rope	Yulia Barsukova; Russia	Tamara Yerofeeva; Ukraine	Alina Kabaeva; Russia
Hoop	Alina Kabaeva; Russia; Eva Serrano; France	None awarded	Yulia Barsukova; Russia
Ball	Alina Kabaeva; Russia; Yulia Raskina; Belarus	None awarded	Yulia Barsukova; Russia
Ribbon	Alina Kabaeva; Russia	Eva Serrano; France	Yulia Raskina; Belarus

== Medal table ==
Rank	Nation	Gold	Silver	Bronze	Total
1	Russia (RUS)	6	0	4	10
2	Belarus (BLR)	1	2	1	4
3	France (FRA)	1	1	0	2
4	Ukraine (UKR)	0	1	0	1
5	Germany (GER)	0	0	1	1
Totals (5 entries)		8	4	6	18
