= Julia Stavickaja =

German rhythmic gymnast (born 1997)

Personal information
- Nationality: German
- Born: 3 December 1997 (age 27)
- Height: 167 cm (5 ft 6 in)
- Weight: 48 kg (106 lb)

Sport
- Country: Germany
- Sport: Rhythmic gymnastics

Julia Stavickaja (born 3 December 1997) is a German rhythmic gymnast. She competed in the group rhythmic gymnastics competition at the 2016 Summer Olympics, where the team was eliminated in the qualification round.
