= Laura Jung =

German rhythmic gymnast

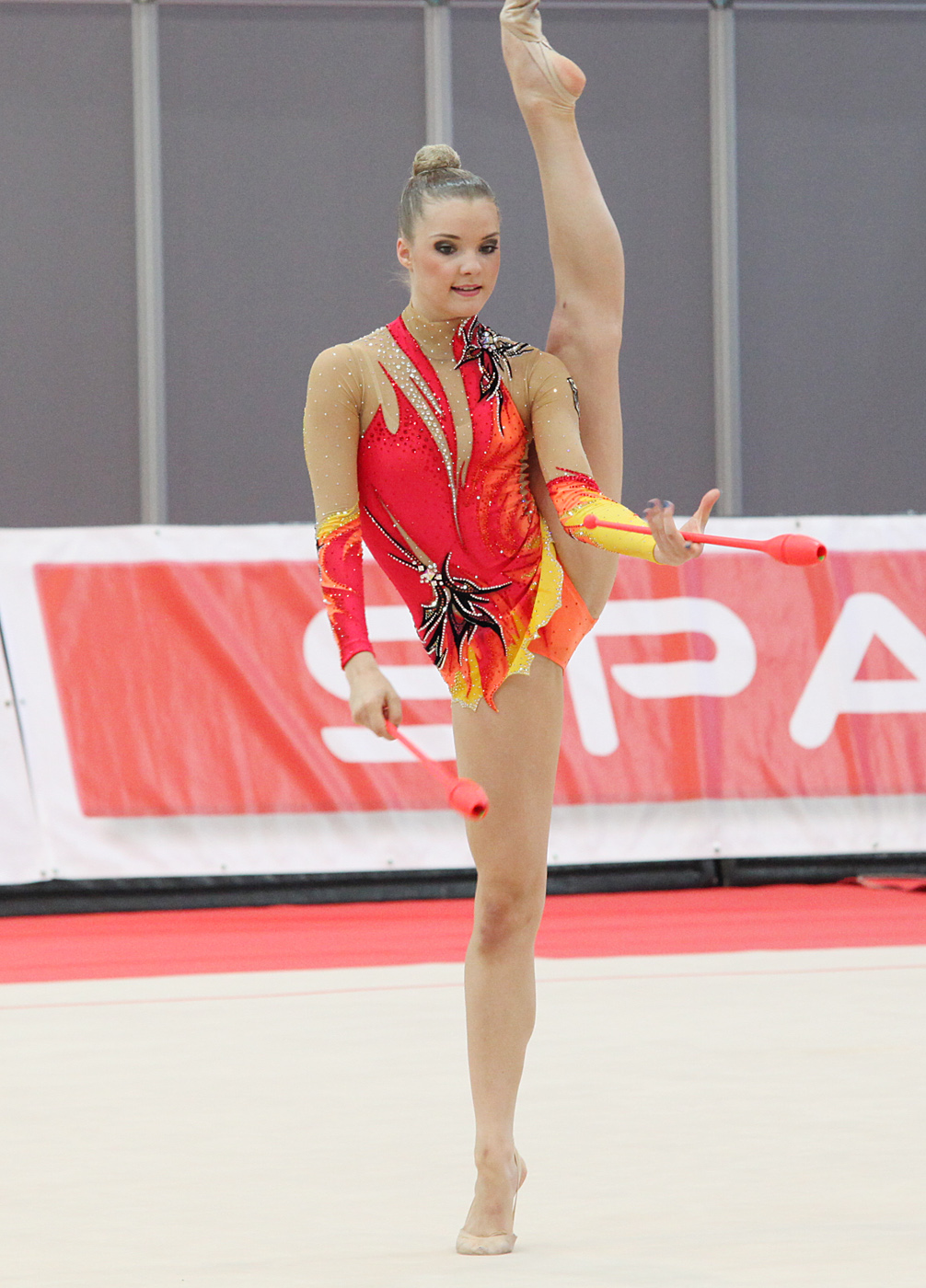
- Jung in 2012

Personal information
- Born: 25 June 1995 (age 31) St. Wendel, Germany
- Height: 168 cm (5 ft 6 in)

Gymnastics career
- Discipline: Rhythmic gymnastics
- Country represented: Germany (2008 - 2016)
- Club: TV St. Wendel
- Head coach: Ludmilla Titkova
- Former coach: Galina Krilenko
Medal record
Rhythmic gymnastics
Representing Germany
Junior European Championships
Bronze medal – third place	2010 Bremen	Team

Laura Jung (born 25 June 1995 in St. Wendel) is a German retired individual rhythmic gymnast.

== Career ==
=== Junior ===
Jung started training on federal base in Fellbach with coach Galina Krilenko. She won a bronze medal in the Team event at the 2010 European Junior Championships together with teammate Jana Berezko-Marggrander where she qualified to two event finals finishing 8th in rope and 4th in clubs.

=== Senior ===
In 2011, Jung debuted as a senior, she competed as a senior at the 2011 European Championships in Minsk, Belarus with teammate Jana Berezko-Marggrander and helped Germany finish 11th in the Team event finals. She finished 19th in the All-around at the 2011 World Championships. In 2012, she replaced Jana Berezko-Marggrander who withdrew from the competition due to injury in the 2012 European Championships, Jung finished 15th in the All-around.

In May 2013, Jung won silver in the All-around at the German Championships behind Jana Berezko-Marggrander. She then competed at the World Cup and Grand Prix series. She competed as the sole German gymnast at the 2013 European Championships in Vienna, Austria due to Berezko-Marggrander's illness. Jung finished 23rd in the All-around at the 2013 World Championships. She then competed at the 2013 Grand Prix Final in Berlin where she finished 7th in all-around and qualified to all 4 event finals.

In 2014 season, Jung began her competition at the 2014 Moscow Grand Prix finishing 16th in all-around. She finished 18th in all-around at the 2014 Thiais Grand Prix. Jung finished 16th in all-around at the 2014 Stuttgart World Cup. On May 30-June 1, Jung competed at the 2014 Minsk World Cup and finished 19th in all-around. On September 22–28, Jung was withdrawn from entry list at the 2014 World Championships due to injury. Jung returned to competition at the 2014 Grand Prix Berlin where she finished 6th in all-around finals behind Kazakh gymnast Aliya Assymova. In the event finals, Jung won bronze in hoop.

In 2015 season, Jung competed at the Trophy de Barcelona finishing 8th in the all-around. On March 21–22, Jung competed at the 2015 Thiais Grand Prix finishing 19th in all-around. On March 27–29, Jung competed at the 2015 Lisboa World Cup finishing 28th in the all-around. On April 10–12, Jung finished 30th in the all-around at the 2015 Pesaro World Cup. Jung sustained an injury but returned to competition at the 2015 World Cup Final in Kazan, finishing 36th in the all-around. On September 9–13, Jung competed at the 2015 World Championships in Stuttgart finishing 44th in the All-around qualifications and did not advance into the Top 24 finals.

In 2016 Season, On April 1–3, Jung competed at the 2016 Pesaro World Cup where she finished 42nd in the all-around. On July 1–3, Jung then competed at the 2016 Berlin World Cup finishing 14th in the all-around, she announced her retirement after the Berlin World Cup because of her long treatment for her back injury and not qualifying for the Olympics in Rio de Janeiro.
