= Karolina Raskina =

German rhythmic gymnast (born 1992)

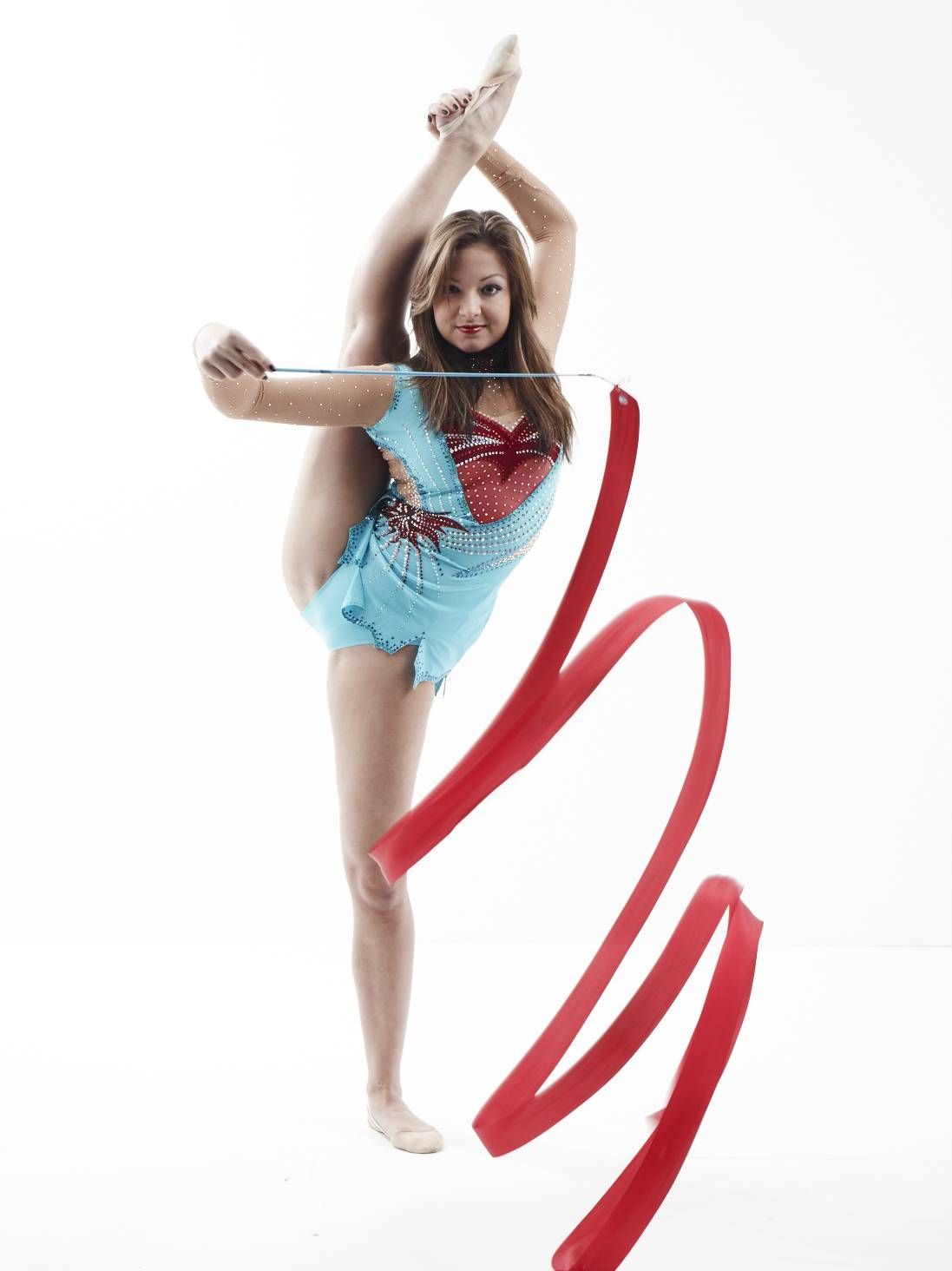
- Born: 28 February 1992 (age 34) Kremenchuk, Ukraine

Gymnastics career
- Discipline: Rhythmic gymnastics
- Country represented: Germany (2009-2011)
- Club: TSV Schmiden
- Head coaches: Natalia Stsiapanava, Ekaterina Kotelikova
- Retired: yes
Medal record
Rhythmic Gymnastics
Representing Germany
Event	1st	2nd	3rd
Grand Prix	1	1	0
FIG World Cup	0	3	2
Total	1	4	2

Karolina Raskina (born 28 February 1992) is a retired German rhythmic gymnast of Ukrainian descent. She was a member of the national senior group.

== Career ==
Born in Ukraine, she came to Berlin with her parents as a small child. There she caught the eye of TSV Schmiden's head coach Galina Krilenko in a youth competition, who then took Raskina with her to Fellbach-Schmiden.

In 2006 she won silver with clubs at an international tournament in Budapest. In September she competed with the same apparatus at the Junior European Championships, finishing 6th in the event final and 10th in teams. The following year she was invited out of competition at the Berlin Masters, replacing Johanna Gabor.

In 2008 Karolina made her senior debut at the World Cup in Minsk where was 15th. In June she became the national All-Around, clubs and ribbon champion.

At the 2009 national championships she and her trainer argued with the judges for having awarded her silver in the All-Around. A few months later she was called up to join the group. She was eventually selected for the World Championships where she was 13th in the All-Around.

In 2010 she debuted at the World Cup in Portimão where the group took 6th place with 3 ribbons and 2 ropes. In Saint Petersburg she won silver in the All-Around and both event finals. Competing at the European Championships in Bremen she was 4th in the All-Around, with 5 hoops and with 3 ribbons and 2 ropes. The group was 5th with 5 hoops and 6th with 3 ribbons and 2 ropes in Pesaro.

Starting the 2011 season she won 5 balls’ gold and 3 ribbons and 2 hoops’ silver at the Grand Prix in Thiais. During the World Cup in Pesaro she was 7th in the All-Around and 5th with 3 ribbons and 2 hoops. At the stage in Nizhny Novgorod she won bronze in the All-Around and with 3 ribbons and 2 hoops.

She retired shortly after due to injury. She worked for some time at the federal base before opening her own club in Berlin.
