= Johanna Gabor =

German rhythmic gymnast (born 1990)

- Born: 18 April 1990 (age 36) Hungary

Gymnastics career
- Discipline: Rhythmic gymnastics
- Country represented: Germany; (2003-2009)
- Club: TSG Söflingen
- Head coach: Galina Krylenko
- Former coach: Tatjana Postrigan
- Retired: yes

Johanna Gabor (born 18 April 1990) is a retired German rhythmic gymnast. She represented her country in international competitions.

== Career ==
The child of ethnic German parents, Johanna came to Germany from Hungary and began her sporting career at the training center in Ulm, where she was discovered by former world champion Alexandra Timoshenko, she then moved to TSG Söflingen to train with Tatjana Postrigan, who came out the same school as Anna Bessonova who became Johanna's idol.

As a junior Johanna won 4 gold medals at the German Championships. In 2004 she moved from Ulm to national team training center in Schmiden training under Galina Krylenko, she became national champion in the All-Around and with ball and clubs. At the 2005 German Championships she won gold overall and in all the apparatus finals. In September she was 14th in the World Cup in Portimão.

She became a senior in 2006, winning the national championships with ball, ribbon and rope as well as in the All-Around, she also was the bronze medalist with clubs. In June of the same year she took part in the World Cup in Irkutsk, taking 13th place in the All-Around, 8th with rope and ribbon and 6th with clubs.

In 2007 she won the All-Around and the hoop and clubs finals at the Gymnastik International. In May she couldn't participate in the German Championships due to injury, but she was selected in September to competed at the World Championships in Patras where she was 22nd overall. In October she was replaced by Karolina Raskina in the 2007 Berlin Masters because she again was injured. In 2008 she was the national runner up, behind Raskina, in the All-Around and with clubs and ribbon, winning gold with rope. She then decided to end her career after failing to qualify for the 2008 Olympics in Beijing.

In 2009 she was incorporated into the national senior group, in August she was 5th overall and with 3 ribbons & 2 ropes, 6th with 5 hoops at the World Cup in Kyiv with the group. Later the group was 12th in the World Cup in Minsk. At the World Championships in Mie, Johanna was 13th with Maike Deuschle, Camilla Pfeffer, Sara Radman and Karolina Raskina in the group All-Around and 13th with 3 ribbons + 2 ropes, 14th with 5 hoops. In October she decided to retire permanently her active sport career. She then studied choreography in Essen and started working as a coach along Rosa Gerwik.
