= Lisa Ingildeeva =

German rhythmic gymnast (born 1988)

- Born: December 4, 1988 (age 37) Moscow, Soviet Union

Gymnastics career
- Discipline: Rhythmic gymnastics
- Country represented: Germany

Lisa Ingildeeva (born December 4, 1988) is an Individual Rhythmic Gymnast from Germany.

Ingildeeva was born in the Soviet Union's capital of Moscow. She relocated to Germany when she was six years old. In Berlin coaches noticed her talent and sent her to Fellbach-Schmiden to consult the coach, Galina Krylenko. Lisa has been the German National Champion in 2003, 2004 and 2005.

She competed at the 2004 Summer Olympics. She concluded her career circa 2008.
