= Anna-Maria Shatokhin =

German rhythmic gymnast (born 2007)

- Born: 2 April 2007 (age 19) Bad Urach, Germany

Gymnastics career
- Discipline: Rhythmic gymnastics
- Country represented: Germany; (2020–present)
- Club: TSV Schmiden
- Gym: Bundesstützpunkt Schmiden
- Head coach: Camilla Pfeffer
- Former coach: Elena Khadartseva
- Choreographer: Ludmila Titkova
Medal record
Rhythmic Gymnastics
Representing Germany
Event	1st	2nd	3rd
World Championships	1	0	0
European Championships	0	0	1
FIG World Cup	0	2	0
FIG World Challenge Cup	1	3	0
Total	2	5	1
World Championships
Gold medal – first place	2025 Rio de Janeiro	Team
European Championships
Bronze medal – third place	2025 Tallinn	3 Balls + 2 Hoops

Anna-Maria Shatokhin (born 2 April 2007) is a German rhythmic gymnast. She represents her country in international competitions.

== Career ==
=== Junior ===
Anna-Maria debuted nationally in 2017 when she competed in the national finals of individual rhythmic gymnastics, ending 7th in the All-Around, 5th with clubs and won bronze in free hands. A year later she was 6th with ball, 5th with hoop and the All-Around.

She participated in the pre junior category at the 2019 German championships, being 3th in the All-Around, 6th with ribbon, 4th with clubs and won silver in free hands. In 2020, she took part in the selection for the Junior European Championships in Kyiv, Ukraine, but in the end the German delegation did not take part because of the COVID-19 pandemic, she was 7th in the All-Around.

In 2021, Shatokhin was part of the German junior group that competed at the European Championships in Varna, Bulgaria. They placed 13th in the All-Around, 11th with 5 balls and 16th with 5 ribbons.

In 2022, she competed in the first national qualifier for the European Championships in Tel Aviv, Israel. She was 2nd in the all-around behind Lada Pusch. In April at the second event she topped the All-Around before Pusch and Viktoria Steinfeld. She then won the under 15 qualification for the German Championships. On 28 May, Anna-Maria won bronze at National Championship behind Niki Gotschewa and Mia Sophie Lietke. The next day she won bronze with ball, silver with clubs and ribbon and gold with hoop. In June, she represented Germany at the European Championships alongside Lada Pusch. They were 6th in teams, Shatokhin competed with clubs and ribbon ending 9th and 4th.

=== Senior ===
Anna-Maria became a senior in 2023, debuting at the "Swirl and Twirl" International Tournament in Udine, Italy, where she finished 3rd in the All-Around. In March she took part in the Fellbach-Schmiden Tournament taking the 5th place in the All-Around. On March 31 she made her World Cup debut in Sofia, taking the 30th place in the All-Around.

In 2024, she competed at Grand Prix Final in Brno and took 11th place in all-around.

In 2025, Anna-Maria switched to competing in group. At the 2025 European Championships in Tallinn, Estonia, Shatokhin and the German group placed 10th in the all-around and won bronze medail in 3 balls + 2 hoops final. In August, she competed at the 2025 World Championships in Rio de Janeiro, Brazil, alongside Melanie Dargel, Olivia Falk, Helena Ripken, Anja Kosan and Emilia Wickert, where they took 8th place in all-around. Together with Darja Varfolomeev and Anastasia Simakova they won the gold medal in team competition.

In 2026, the group started its season competing at World Cup in Sofia, winning silver medal in the all-around. They were 5th in 5 balls and 4th in 3 hoops + 4 clubs final. In May, at the World Challenge Cup in Portimão they won silver in the all-around. In finals they won silver with 5 balls and gold with 3 hoops + 4 clubs. In the end of May, Shatokhin and her teammates competed at the 2026 European Championships in Varna, Bulgaria, where they placed 5th in all-around. They took 5th place in team competition together with individuals and 6th place in 3 hoops + 4 clubs due to loss of apparatus. In June, they won silver in the all-around and 5 balls final at World Challenge Cup in Cluj-Napoca. They finished fourth in 3 hoops + 4 clubs final. In July, they competed at the World Cup Milan and ended in 10th place in the all-around and won silver medal in 3 hoops + 4 clubs final. They took 4th place in group all-around and 4th place in team competition alongside Varfolomeev, Pusch and Simakova. They qualified to both apparatus finals, finishing 6th in 3 hoops + 4 clubs and 8th in 5 balls.

== Routine music information ==
Year	Apparatus	Music Title
2024	Hoop	Asturias by Joja Wendt
2024	Ball	Start A Riot by BEGINNERS, Night Panda
2024	Clubs	Body Talks by The Struts
2024	Ribbon	
