= Kristin Sroka =

German rhythmic gymnast

- Born: 23 May 1977 (age 49) Leipzig, Sachsen, Germany
- Height: 172 cm (5 ft 8 in) (at the 1996 Olympics)

Gymnastics career
- Discipline: Rhythmic gymnastics
- Country represented: Germany
- Club: TSV Schmiden, Fellbach

Kristin Sroka (23 May 1977, Leipzig) is a German rhythmic gymnast.

Sroka competed for Germany in the rhythmic gymnastics individual all-around competition at the 1996 Summer Olympics in Atlanta. There she was 14th in the qualification and advanced to the semifinal, in the semifinal she was 16th and didn't advance to the final of 10 competitors.
