= Yulia Raskina =

Belarusian rhythmic gymnast (born 1982)

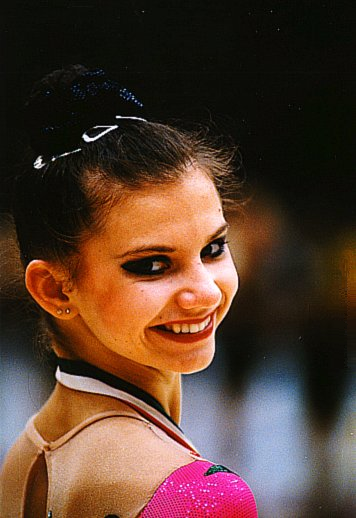
- Yulia Raskina at 1999 European Championships

Personal information
- Full name: Yulia Raskina
- Born: 9 April 1982 (age 44) Minsk, Byelorussian SSR, Soviet Union

Gymnastics career
- Discipline: Rhythmic gymnastics
- Country represented: Belarus; (1995-2003)
- Head coach: Irina Leparskaya
- Retired: 2003
Medal record
Rhythmic Gymnastics
Representing Belarus
Olympic Games
Silver medal – second place	2000 Sydney	All-Around
World Championships
Silver medal – second place	1997 Berlin	Team
Silver medal – second place	1999 Osaka	All-around
Silver medal – second place	1999 Osaka	Ball
Silver medal – second place	1999 Osaka	Ribbon
Silver medal – second place	1999 Osaka	Team
European Championships
Gold medal – first place	1998 Porto	Team
Gold medal – first place	2000 Zaragoza	Ball
Silver medal – second place	1999 Budapest	All-around
Silver medal – second place	1999 Budapest	Hoop
Silver medal – second place	2000 Zaragoza	All-around
Silver medal – second place	2000 Zaragoza	Team
Bronze medal – third place	1998 Porto	Clubs
Bronze medal – third place	1999 Budapest	Ribbon
Bronze medal – third place	2000 Zaragoza	Ribbon
Junior European Championships
Silver medal – second place	1995 Prague	Team
Bronze medal – third place	1995 Prague	Clubs
World Cup Final
Bronze medal – third place	2000 Glasgow	Hoop
Bronze medal – third place	2000 Glasgow	Ribbon
Bronze medal – third place	2000 Glasgow	Ball
Grand Prix Final
Gold medal – first place	1999 Korneuburg	All-around
Gold medal – first place	2000 Deventer	Hoop
Silver medal – second place	1999 Korneuburg	Hoop
Silver medal – second place	1999 Korneuburg	Ball
Silver medal – second place	2000 Deventer	Ball
Bronze medal – third place	1999 Korneuburg	Ribbon
Bronze medal – third place	1998 Linz	All-around
Bronze medal – third place	2000 Deventer	Rope
Bronze medal – third place	2000 Deventer	Ribbon

Yulia Raskina (Russian: Юлия Раскина; born 9 April 1982) is a Belarusian former rhythmic gymnast and current German coach. She is the 2000 Olympics silver medalist, the 1999 World all-around silver medalist, the two time (2000, 1999) European all-around silver medalist and 1999 Grand Prix Final all-around champion.

== Career ==
Raskina was a three-time national champion and won her first senior international medal at the 1997 World Championships in Berlin, where she won the team silver. She became the 1999 World Championships all-around silver medalist and was a two-time European all-around silver medalist in 1999 and 2000. Raskina won the gold medal with the ball at the 2000 European Championships in Zaragosa.

Raskina marked a career high by winning the silver in the all-around competition at the 2000 Summer Olympics held in Sydney, Australia, ahead of then Olympic gold favorite Alina Kabaeva, who took the bronze medal. Raskina lost the gold to Yulia Barsukova by 0.084 points. Had her hoop not gone out of bounds by an inch, which was a mandatory 0.1 deduction, she would have won the gold. Raskina competed infrequently following the Sydney Olympics and finally retired from competitive rhythmic gymnastics in 2003.

In 2005 and 2006, Raskina took part in Cirque du Soleil's Corteo alongside former Ukrainian rhythmic gymnast Tamara Yerofeeva. She won the Belarusian TV project "Star Dances" with professional dancer Denis Moryasin and was selected to represent Belarus at the Eurovision Dance Contest.

== Coaching career ==
Raskina currently works as a coach for the German national team in rhythmic gymnastics. Her coaching style includes teaching her students to focus on the music to prevent anxiety and building throughout the season to the World Championships: "I’m not asking them to do clean routines in March, April, May, June, or July. I ask for clean maybe only in the last two weeks before the World Championships. I don’t want to stress them so much."

In 2022, she and René Spies were named German Coaches of the Year by the German Olympic Sports Confederation.

Notable trainees include:

- Darja Varfolomeev - Olympic all-around champion (2024), multiple Rhythmic Gymnastics European Championships gold medalist and three-time consecutive World champion
- Margarita Kolosov- finalist at the World Championships and European Championships, medallist at the World Cups, and 4th place at the 2024 Olympic Games
- Anastasia Simakova - ball silver medallist in the 2025 European Championships and team gold medalist at the 2025 World Championships
- Lada Pusch - ball silver medallist in the 2023 Junior World Championships

== Routine music information ==
Year	Apparatus	Music title
2003	Hoop	Vas Dis by Wishbone Ash
2003	Clubs	Dy by Vitas
2003	Ball	Lautary by Lokyo
2003	Ribbon	Ave Maria by Vitas
2000	Hoop	Manhattan by Anatoly Vekshin
2000	Rope	Smuglyanochka by Anatoly Vekshin
2000	Ball	Spain (originally Malagueña) by Anatoly Vekshin
2000	Ribbon	Underground /Storm / A New Life music from The Truman Show by Burkard Dalwitz
1999	Hoop	?
1999	Rope	I Will Survive by Anatoly Vekshin (originally Gloria Gainor)
1999	Ball	?
1999	Ribbon	?
1998	Rope	Belarus traditional folk
1998	Clubs	?
1998	Hoop	Latin samba remix
1998	Ribbon	Otchi Tchornia (Dark Eyes) – Russian traditional music
1997	Hoop	?
1997	Clubs	Cabaret by John Kander
1997	Rope	?
1997	Ribbon	Otchi Tchornia (Dark Eyes) – Russian traditional music

== Detailed Olympic results ==
Year	Competition description	Location	Music	Apparatus	Score-Final	Score-Qualifying
2000	Olympics	Sydney		All-around	39.548	39.624
2000	Olympics	Sydney	Underground/ Storm / A New Life music from The Truman Show	Ribbon	9.916	9.908
2000	Olympics	Sydney	Spain (Malagueña) by Anatoly Vekshin	Ball	9.933	9.908
2000	Olympics	Sydney	Manhattan by Anatoly Vekshin	Hoop	9.791	9.908
2000	Olympics	Sydney	Smuglyanochka by Anatoly Vekshin	Rope	9.908	9.900

== See also ==
- List of select Jewish gymnasts
