= Jana Berezko-Marggrander =

German rhythmic gymnast

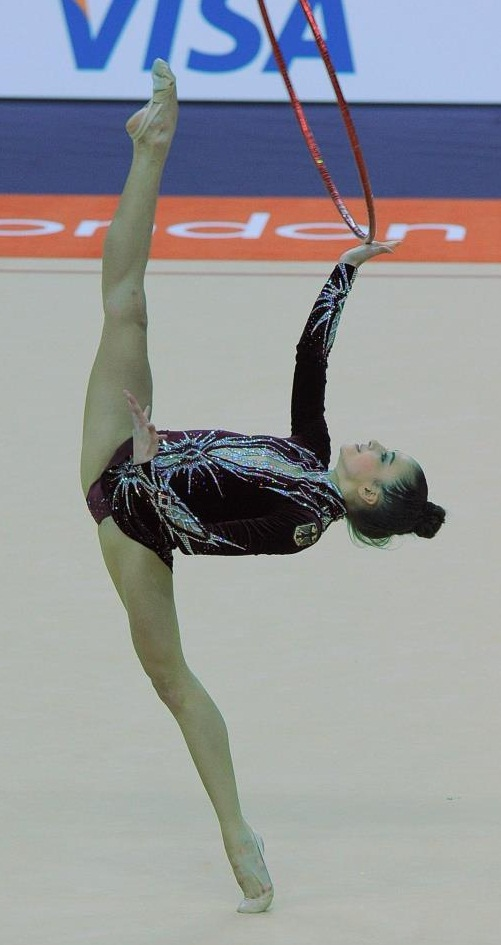

Personal information
- Born: 17 October 1995 (age 30) Tolyatti, Russia

Gymnastics career
- Discipline: Rhythmic gymnastics
- Country represented: Germany (2009–2016)
- Club: TSV Schmiden
- Head coach: Galina Krylenko
- Retired: yes
- World ranking: 38 (2016 Season); 29 (2015 Season); 22 (2014 Season); 24 (2013 Season); 24 (2012 Season); 56 (2011 Season)
Medal record
Rhythmic gymnastics
Representing Germany
Youth Olympic Games
Bronze medal – third place	2010 Singapore	All-around
Junior European Championships
Bronze medal – third place	2010 Bremen	Team
Bronze medal – third place	2010 Bremen	Hoop
Bronze medal – third place	2010 Bremen	Ball
- Website: www.jana-berezko.de

Jana Berezko-Marggrander (Russian: Яна Березко-Маргграндер, born 17 October 1995 in Tolyatti, Samara Oblast, Russia) is a German retired individual rhythmic gymnast. She is the 2010 Youth Olympic all-around bronze medalist.

== Career ==
=== Junior ===
Berezko-Marggrander moved to Germany with her family in 2008 and started training on the federal base in Fellbach with coach Galina Krylenko. She is a member of the club TSV Schmiden. As a junior, she competed at the 2010 Junior International Schmiden where she won silver in all-around behind Russian Daria Svatkovskaya. She won silver in hoop and clubs and bronze in ball final. She won three bronze medals at the 2010 European Junior Championships in the team event and in the ball and hoop finals. She also represented Germany and competed at the 2010 Youth Olympic Games where she won the all-around bronze medal.

=== Senior ===
Berezko-Marggrander competed as a senior at the 2011 European Championships in Minsk, Belarus with teammate Laura Jung and helped Germany finish 11th in the Team event finals. She withdrew from competition at the 2012 European Championships due to an injury. She represented Germany at the 2012 London Olympics in the individual all-around event, where she placed 17th.

In 2013, Berezko-Marggrander struggled with injuries at the start of the season. She won the all-around gold medal at the 2013 International Schmiden Tournament. She then competed at the 2013 Thiais Grand Prix. She competed in the World Cup series, at 2013 Pesaro World Cup and 2013 Corbeil-Essonnes World Cup. Berezko-Marggrander fell ill and withdrew from the 2013 European Championships in Vienna, Austria. She then competed at the 2013 World Cup Final in St.Petersburg, Russia where she finished 9th in all-around behind Azeri gymnast Lala Yusifova. She qualified for her first event final in hoop where she finished 8th. She tied for 13th place with Lala Yusifova in the All-around at the 2013 World Championships. She then competed at the 2013 Grand Prix Final in Berlin where she finished 5th in all-around and qualified to 3 event finals (hoop, clubs, ribbon).

In 2014 Season, Berezko-Marggrander began her competition at the 2014 Moscow Grand Prix and finished 18th in the all-around. She finished 8th in all-around at the 2014 Thiais Grand Prix. At the 2014 Stuttgart World Cup, Berezko-Marggrander finished 13th in the all-around and qualified to event final in clubs where she finished 8th. On May 30 – June 1, Berezko-Marggrander competed at the 2014 Minsk World Cup and finished 17th in all-around. On September 5–7, at the 2014 World Cup Final in Kazan, Russia, Berezko-Marggrander finished 30th in the all-around finals. On September 22–28, Berezko-Marggrander competed at the 2014 World Championships but did not reach the all-around finals finishing in 28th place in qualifications. On October 18–20, Berezko-Marggrander competed at the 2014 Grand Prix Berlin and won the all-around bronze medal behind Israel's Victoria Veinberg Filanovsky, she won gold in clubs and silver in ball finals.

In 2015 season, Berezko-Marggrander competed at the Trophy de Barcelona finishing 7th in the all-around. On March 21–22, Berezko-Marggrander competed at the 2015 Thiais Grand Prix finishing 12th in the all-around. On March 27–29, Berezko-Marggrander competed at the 2015 Lisboa World Cup finishing 30th in the all-around. On April 10–12, Berezko-Marggrander finished 22nd in the all-around at the 2015 Pesaro World Cup. Berezko-Marggrander finished 10th in all-around at the 2015 Grand Prix Berlin with a total of 69.650 putting her ahead of Katsiaryna Halkina. In July, Berezko-Marggrander took the silver medal in all-around at the Izmir International Tournament behind Carolina Rodriguez. In August, Berezko-Marggrander finished 19th in the all-around at the 2015 Budapest World Cup. At the 2015 World Cup Final in Kazan, Berezko-Marggrander finished 22nd in the all-around. On September 9–13, Berezko-Marggrander competed at the 2015 World Championships in Stuttgart, she qualified for the All-around finals finishing in 19th place.

In 2016, Berezko-Marggrander started her season competing at the 2016 Grand Prix Moscow finishing 28th in the all-around. At the 30th Thiais Grand Prix event in Paris, Berezko-Marggrander finished 15th in the all-around. On April 1–3, she competed at the 2016 Pesaro World Cup where she finished 28th in the all-around. On April 21–22, Berezko-Marggrander won an Olympics license by finishing eight amongst a top 8 selection of highest score for non-qualified gymnasts at the 2016 Gymnastics Olympic Test Event held in Rio de Janeiro. On June 3–5, Berezko-Marggrander finished 20th in the all-around at the 2016 Guadalajara World Cup with a total of 66.400 points. On July 1–3, Berezko-Marggrander competed at the 2016 Berlin World Cup finishing 9th in the all-around with a total of 69.650 points. On August 19–20, Berezko-Marggrander competed at the 2016 Summer Olympics held in Rio de Janeiro, Brazil. She finished 18th in the rhythmic gymnastics individual all-around qualifications and did not advance to the top 10 finals.

Berezko-Marggrander completed her career at the end of the season.

== Routine music information ==
Year	Apparatus	Music title
2016	Hoop	A Little Party Never Killed Nobody (All We Got) by Fergie, Q-Tip and GoonRock
2016	Ball	Adah's Theme (La Femme Avec Les Yeux Lumineux) by Drama Queen
2016	Clubs	Olei (Black) by Nino Katamadze & Insight
2016	Ribbon	Como Se Anda En El Campo by Jorge Padro, Manolito Soler, Manolo Carrasco
2015	Hoop	Dark Tango by Edo Notarloberti
2015	Ball	Adah's Theme (La Femme Avec Les Yeux Lumineux) by Drama Queen
2015	Clubs	Guerila Lamentos by Diablo Swing Orchestra
2015	Ribbon	Como Se Anda En El Campo by Manolo Carrasco
2014	Hoop	Dark Tango by Edo Notarloberti
2014	Ball	Passacaglia by Secret Garden
2014	Clubs	Guerila Lamentos by Diablo Swing Orchestra
2014	Ribbon	
2013	Hoop	Hora Zero by Rodrigo Y Gabriela
2013	Ball	Triangle Tango music from Corteo by Cirque du Soleil
2013	Clubs	Bahamut by Hazmat Modine
2013	Ribbon	Gulli Gulli by The Rhythmagic Orchestra
2012	Hoop	Tango of the Night by Petr Dranga
2012	Ball	music from Les parapluies de Cherbourg OST by Michel Legrand
2012	Clubs	Hanuman by Rodrigo y Gabriela
2012	Ribbon	The disillusioned guitarist by Adam Summerhayes
2011	Hoop	?
2011	Ball	music from Les parapluies de Cherbourg OST by Michel Legrand
2011	Clubs	Hanuman by Rodrigo y Gabriela
2011	Ribbon	The disillusioned guitarist by Adam Summerhayes
2010	Hoop	Differente music from Gotan Project by Gotan Project
2010	Ball	Serenade by David Garrett
2010	Clubs	Latino Donna by Petr Dranga
2010	Ribbon	?
