= Lena Asmus =

Russian and German gymnast

- Full name: Helene Asmus
- Born: 5 May 1982 (age 44) Omsk, Omsk Oblast, Russian SFSR, Soviet Union
- Height: 170 cm (5 ft 7 in) (at the 2000 Olympics)

Gymnastics career
- Discipline: Rhythmic gymnastics
- Country represented: Germany
- Club: TV Wattenscheid, Wattenscheid
Medal record
Representing Germany
Rhythmic Gymnastics
European Championships
Bronze medal – third place	2000 Zaragoza	Team

Helene "Lena" Asmus (Russian: Елена Асмус; born 5 May 1982 in Omsk) is a Russian and German rhythmic gymnast.

Asmus competed for Germany in the rhythmic gymnastics individual all-around competition at the 2000 Summer Olympics in Sydney. There she was 17th in the qualification and didn't advance to the final of 10 competitors.
