= Lada Pusch =

German rhythmic gymnast (born 2008)

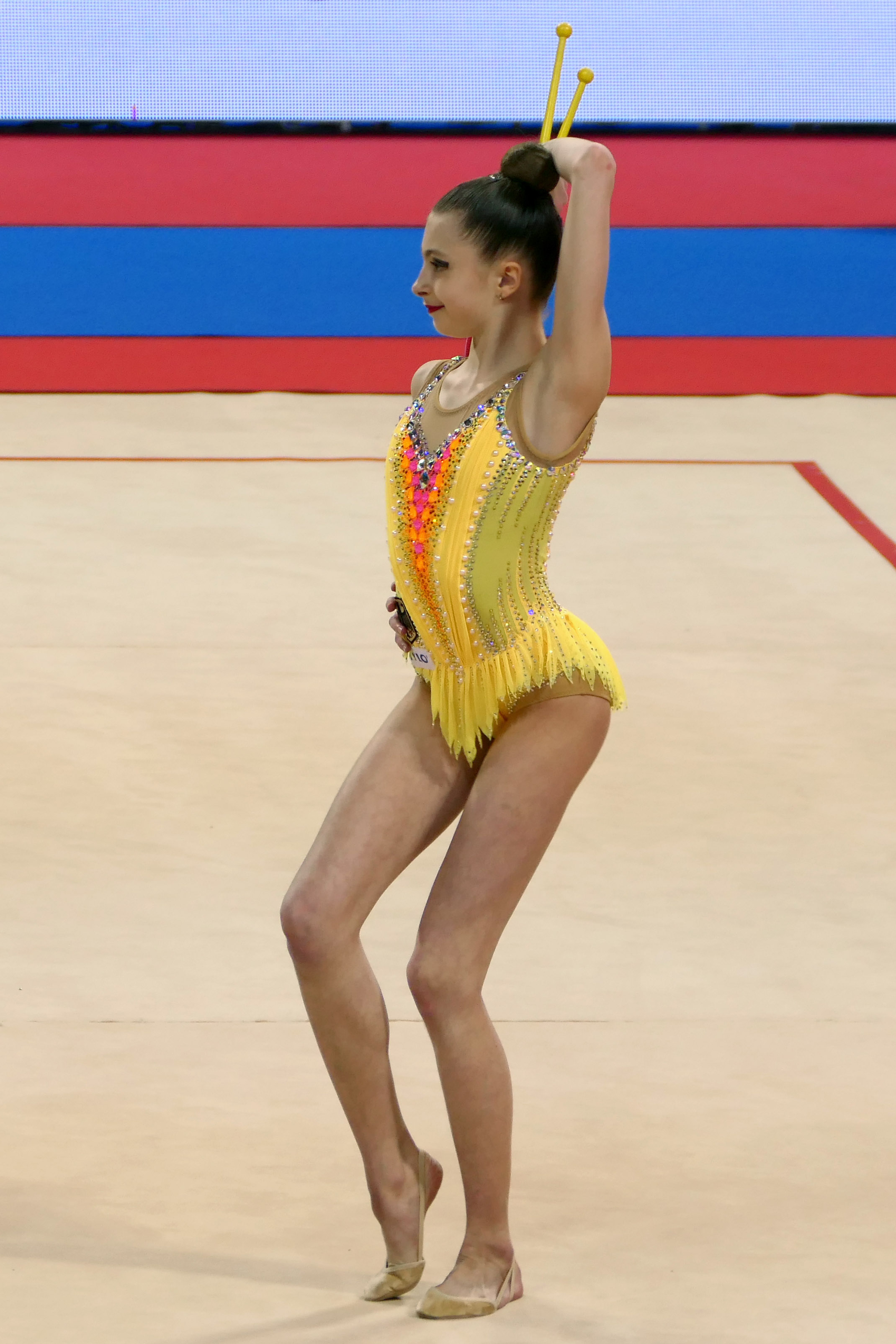
- Pusch in 2024
- Full name: Lada Pusch
- Born: 19 March 2008 (age 18) Müllheim, Germany
- Height: 155 cm (5 ft 1 in)

Gymnastics career
- Discipline: Rhythmic gymnastics
- Country represented: Germany; (2022–present)
- Club: TSV Schmiden
- Gym: Bundesstützpunkt Schmiden
- Head coaches: Natalya Raskina,Yulia Raskina
Medal record
Event	1st	2nd	3rd
Junior World Championships	0	1	0
Total	0	1	0
Rhythmic Gymnastics
Representing Germany
Junior World Championships
Silver medal – second place	2023 Cluj-Napoca	Ball

Lada Pusch (born 19 March 2008) is a German rhythmic gymnast. She is the silver medalist with ball at the 2023 Junior World Championship.

On national level, she is the 2026 German all-around silver medalist and the 2021 German junior all-around champion.

== Career ==
=== Junior ===
In 2021, Pusch won bronze in the all-around at the German junior national championship. She also won gold with the ribbon and bronze with hoop, ball, clubs.

In 2022 she competed in the first national qualifier for the European Championships. She was first in the all-around in front of Anna-Maria Shatokhin. In April, at the second event, she was the runner-up after Shatokhin and ahead of Viktoria Steinfeld. In June, she represented Germany at the European Championships in Tel Aviv alongside Shatokhin. They placed 6th in team competition. Pusch competed with hoop and ball and ended 9th and 6th.

In 2023, she represented Germany at the 2023 Junior World Championships in Cluj-Napoca together with Melissa Kar. She qualified to all three apparatus finals, placing 5th in both hoop and ribbon, while she won silver medal with ball. Between September and October, she participated in the Aeon Cup in Japan with Margarita Kolosov and Darja Varfolomeev, winning the team competition as well as the junior category.

=== Senior ===
==== 2024 ====
Pusch turned senior in 2024. In early April, she competed in the Italian Serie A on behalf of the club San Giorgio '79 Desio. The next week, she competed at the World Cup stage in Sofia to gain experience at international competition. Her best result in the all-around was 12th place with clubs. At the beginning of May, she competed in the International Tournament at Portimão. She won the all-around and reached all four apparatus finals, where she won three more medals: gold with hoop, silver with ribbon, and bronze with ball. She was 4th in the all-around at the German National Championships. In the apparatus finals, she won bronze medals with the hoop, ball and clubs. In September she was selected for the AEON Cup in Tokyo along Anastasia Simakova and junior Alisa Datsenko, being 6th in teams.

==== 2025 ====
Pusch began her 2025 season in late February by competing for the Italian club San Giorgio '79 Desio during the first stage of the Italian Serie A1 club championship. She performed her clubs routine and team took 5th place. On April 18-20, she competed at the World Cup in Baku, where she took 16th place in the all-around. She advanced into the ribbon final and ended in 8th place.

In June, she competed at her first European Championships, in Tallinn, Estonia. She qualified for the clubs final, where she finished 7th, and she called the event a "wonderful experience". She won bronze medals with ball and clubs at the 2025 German National Championships.

==== 2026 ====
In 2026, she started her season competing at Schmiden Gymnastik International. She won the gold medal in the ball final and took 8th place in hoop. A week later, she won the gold medal in the all-around at MTM Tournament in Ljubljana. On April 10-12, she competed at the Tashkent World Cup and took 28th place in the all-around. Next, she competed at Baku World Cup, taking 30th place in all-around. In early May, she took 5th place in all-around at Gdynia Rhythmic Stars and won silver medal in ball final.

At the end of May, she represented Germany alongside teammates Darja Varfolomeev and Viktoria Steinfeld at the 2026 European Championships in Varna, Bulgaria. Together with the senior group, they took 5th place in the team competition. She competed only with clubs, taking 25th place in qualifications. In July, she took 34th place in the all-around at Milan World Cup. Later in the month, she won the silver medal in the all-around behind Varfolomeev at the 2026 German National Championships. In the apparatus finals, she won gold in clubs and two silvers in the hoop and ribbon finals. Afterwards, she was selected to compete at the 2026 World Championships in Frankfurt with three apparatus. She took 41st place in all-around qualifications.

== Routine music information ==
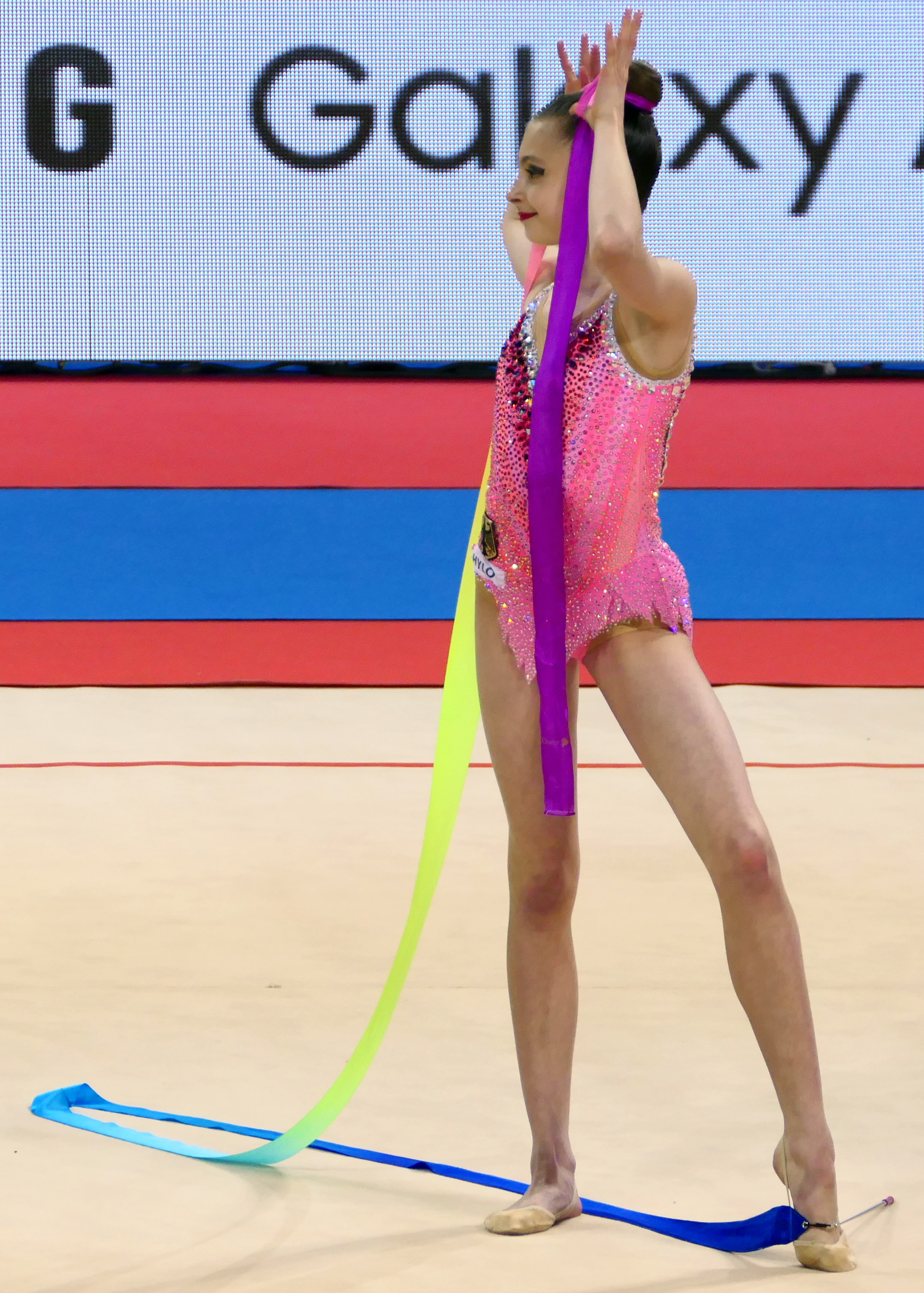
Pusch's starting pose with ribbon at the 2024 Sofia World Cup

Year	Apparatus	Music Title
2026	Hoop	Pendulum by Duomo
2026	Ball	Runaway by Aurora
2026	Clubs	Follow The Leader (feat. Jennifer Lopez) by Wisin & Yandel
2026	Ribbon	MIDDLE OF THE NIGHT by Elley Duhé
2025	Hoop	Pendulum by Duomo
2025	Ball	Runaway by Aurora
2025	Clubs	Follow The Leader (feat. Jennifer Lopez) by Wisin & Yandel
2025	Ribbon	Overture/And All That Jazz by Catherine Zeta-Jones, Renee Zellweger & Taye Diggs
2024	Hoop	Child of Nazareth by Maxime Rodriguez
2024	Ball	Love Story by Indila
2024	Clubs	Follow The Leader (feat. Jennifer Lopez) by Wisin & Yandel
2024	Ribbon	Me Too by Meghan Trainor
2023	Hoop	Child of Nazareth by Maxime Rodriguez
2023	Ball	Love Story by Indila
2023	Clubs	Crazy in Love (Electro Swing Version) by Swing Republic
2023	Ribbon	Me Too by Meghan Trainor
2022	Hoop	Wolf Pack by Bachar Mar-Khalifé
2022	Ball	Never Seen the Rain by Tones And I
2022	Clubs	Crazy in Love (Electro Swing Version) by Swing Republic
2022	Ribbon	Swan Lake, Act III, Op.20 by Kirov Opera and Ballet Theatre
