= Magdalena Brzeska =

German rhythmic gymnast

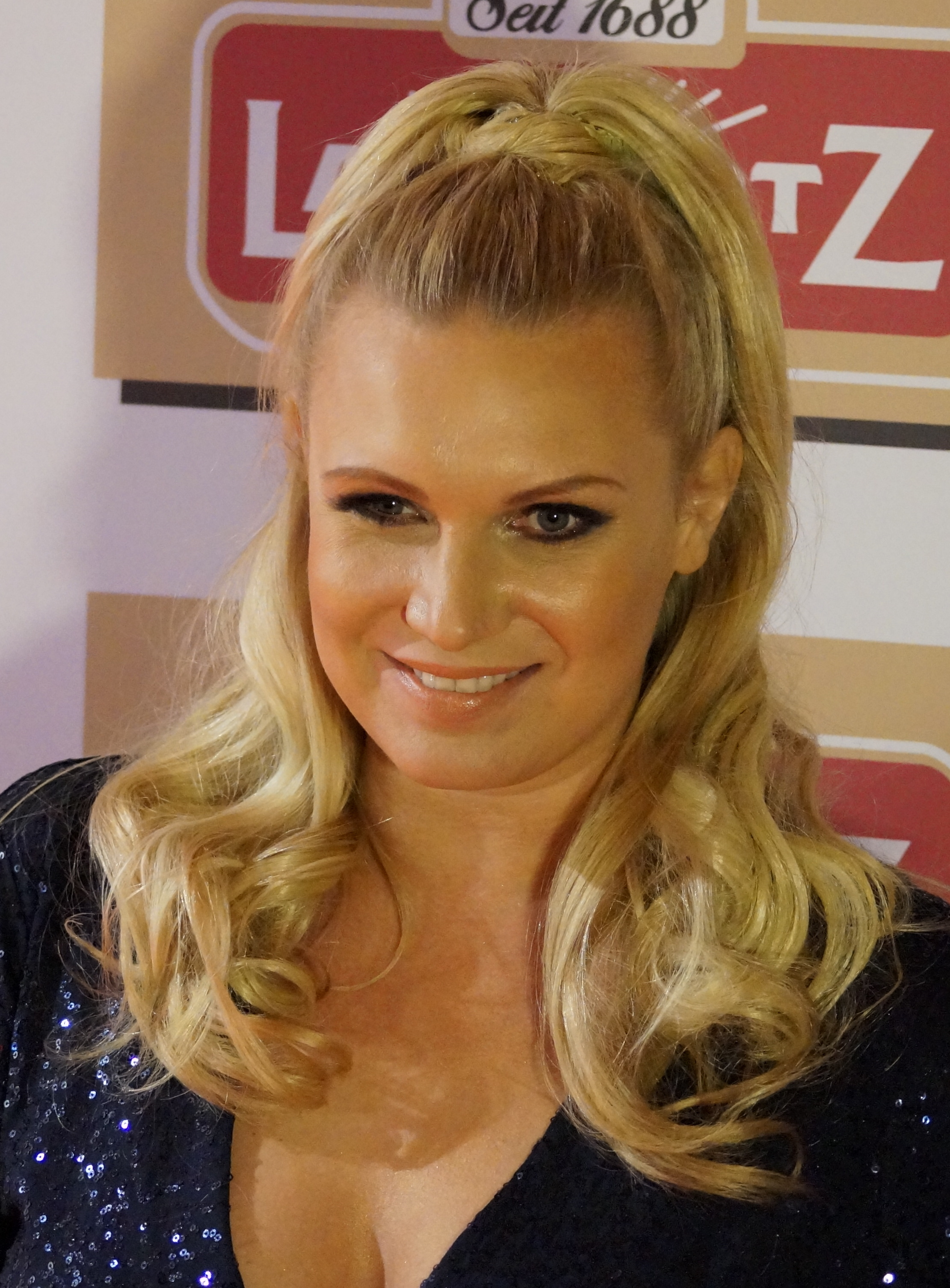
- Brzeska in 2015

Personal information
- Born: 14 May 1978 (age 48) Gdynia, Poland

Gymnastics career
- Discipline: Rhythmic gymnastics
- Country represented: Germany
- Club: TV Wattenscheid
- Assistant coach: Livia Medilanski
- Former coach: Kristina Georgieva
- Retired: 1998

Magdalena Brzeska (born 14 May 1978) is a German retired individual rhythmic gymnast.

== Personal life ==
Brzeska was born in Gdynia, Poland. In 2001, she married professional footballer Peter Peschel, with whom she has two daughters born in 2000 and 2001. They filed for divorce in 2002. In December 2009, she remarried to Polish-born real estate broker Sebastian Sabolocki, however just after 15 months filed for divorce. Brzeska lived until 2009 in Stuttgart. During her second marriage; she lived from the end of 2010 to 2013 in Munich and then moved to Ulm.

== Career ==
In 1990, Brzeska began rhythmic gymnastics training at TSV Schmiden. There she remained for six years winning all the national titles, she was trained by Kristina Georgieva until 1996. She then relocated to the club TV Wattenscheid for 2 years and was coached by Livia Medilanski.

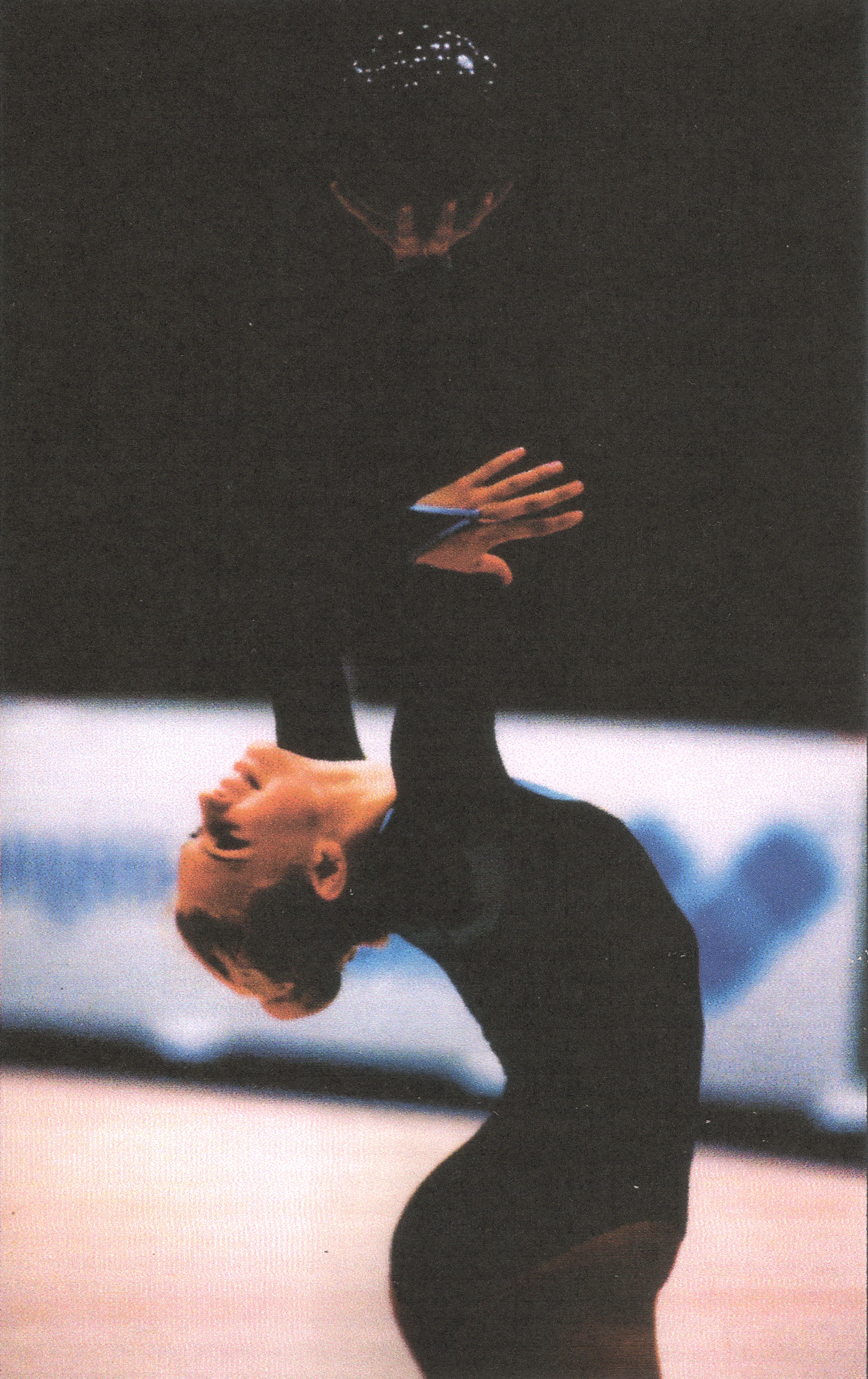
Brzeska in 1996

In 1992, Brzeska competed in her first Europeans at the 1992 European Championships finishing 14th in the All-around finals. She would have qualified for the 1992 Olympic Games in Barcelona, but was unable to attend because she did not yet have a German passport. Brzeska has competed in 5 World Championships and was a regular in the Top 10 all-around rankings, she earned her highest placement finishing 8th in the all-around at the 1995 World Championships as well as qualifying for all the apparatus finals in ball, clubs, rope and ribbon.

In praise of Brzeska's dedication to her sport, American Singer/Songwriter Haras Fyre wrote a two-song music CD entitled "Magdalena" for the gymnast. Thereafter, Brzeska and Fyre appeared regularly in televised sport and variety programs, with Brzeska dancing to the music while Haras Fyre sang.

Brzeska represented Germany at the 1996 Olympic Games in Atlanta finishing 10th in the All-around finals.

After her retirement, Brzeska is a regular guest at show performances in Germany's television programs and in the entertainment industry. She appeared at the 2006 Pro7 show with Stars on Ice, in which her partner was professional figure skater Norman Jeschke. On 1 September 2006, she starred in the ZDF show "The big celebrity gymnastics" with Johannes B. Kerner as a trainer for the participating celebrities.

Brzeska was an ambassador for Germany at the 2008 European Year of Intercultural Dialogue. The aim of the European Commission's campaign was to inform people in all 27 EU countries about the benefits of diversity and to encourage them to have intercultural exchange programs.

Since March 2009, she has an advertising contract with the fashion company Wissmach Göppinger. In July 2010, Brzeska participated in the reality show Solitary. However, after 40 hours she left the program voluntarily. She appeared in the cover of Playboy Germany for the September 2011 issue.

In 2012, Brzeska took part in the fifth season of Germany's RTL-dance show Let's Dance with her professional dance partner Erich Klann. In July 2013, Brzeska participated in the RTL Live Event Show The Pool Champions - Celebrities underwater part, in which she was able to win in the final against Massimo Sinato.

In 2015, Brzeska was an official ambassador at the 2015 World Rhythmic Gymnastics Championships held in Stuttgart, Germany.
