= Anastasia Simakova =

German rhythmic gymnast (born 2004)

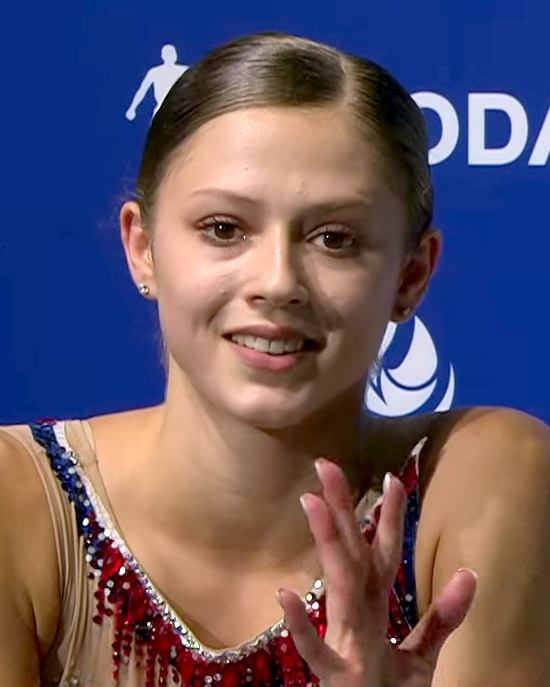
- Simakova in 2025

Personal information
- Full name: Anastasia Gennadyevna Simakova
- Nickname: Simka
- Born: 9 September 2004 (age 22) Omsk, Russia

Gymnastics career
- Discipline: Rhythmic gymnastics
- Country represented: Germany (2023-present)
- Former countries represented: Russia (2016-2022)
- Club: TSV Schmiden
- Gym: Bundesstützpunkt Schmiden
- Head coach: Yulia Raskina
- Former coaches: Vera Shtelbaums, Elena Arays, Yevgeniya Kanayeva, Marina Drozd
- World ranking: 31 (2025 Season )
Medal record
Rhythmic Gymnastics
Representing Russia and Germany
Event	1st	2nd	3rd
World Championships	1	0	1
European Championships	0	1	0
Summer Universiade	0	1	1
FIG World Cup	0	0	1
Junior World Championships	2	0	0
Total	3	2	3
Representing Germany
World Championships
Gold medal – first place	2025 Rio de Janeiro	Team
Bronze medal – third place	2025 Rio de Janeiro	Hoop
European Championships
Silver medal – second place	2025 Tallinn	Ball
Summer Universiade
Silver medal – second place	2025 Rhine-Rhur	Hoop
Bronze medal – third place	2025 Rhine-Rhur	Ball
Representing Russia
Junior World Championships
Gold medal – first place	2019 Moscow	Team
Gold medal – first place	2019 Moscow	Rope

Anastasia Gennadyevna Simakova (Russian: Анастасия Геннадьевна Симакова; born 9 September 2004 in Omsk, Russia) is a Russian-born individual rhythmic gymnast who competes for Germany, where she holds citizenship. She is the 2025 European silver medalist with ball and the 2019 World Junior rope and team champion.

On the national level, she is a two-time (2024, 2026) German national all-around bronze medalist and the 2025 German national all-around silver medalist. She is also a multiple medalist at the Russian junior nationals (among Candidates for Master of Sport in 2017, 2018 and 2019).

== Personal life ==
She studies finance at Moscow Finance Academy.

== Gymnastics career ==
She began training in rhythmic gymnastics at age 4.

=== Junior ===
In 2019, Simakova was part of a junior national team. She competed at International tournament Sofia cup, where she won gold medal in team and clubs. She competed in the 2019 Junior World Rhythmic Gymnastics Championships, where she became the World junior champion in the rope and team events.

=== Senior ===
Simakova competed at the 2020 Russian Rhythmic Gymnastics Championships, placing 7th in the individual senior all-around final. She won bronze in the ribbon final. Simakova was registered to compete in the 2021 World Cup Sofia, along with Lala Kramarenko, which took place on March 26–28; however, both were withdrawn, and there was no individual Russian representation. Simakova competed in the Grand Prix in Marbella, where she placed third behind Viktoriia Onopriienko in the all-around. She also won silver in the ball final, and she came in 4th place in the ribbon final and 5th in the clubs final.

In 2022 she moved to Germany, following her parents, who enrolled in the program of repatriation for Russian Germans. She started to train in Fellbach with Yulia Raskina in November 2023. Her change of nationality from Russian to German was approved in March 2023, which meant she could begin representing Germany at competitions starting in March 2024.

==== 2024 ====
In 2024, she represented Germany for the first time at the Marbella Grand Prix, where she ended in 12th place in the all-around competition and 8th in the ball final. She next competed in the World Cup Palaio Faliro, where she finished in 25th place in the all-around, and in the World Cup Baku, where she finished in 9th place in the all-around and 8th in the hoop final. On May 10–12, she competed at World Cup Portimao and again finished in 9th place in the all-around. She also qualified to two apparatus finals and placed 4th in ribbon and 8th in ball.

She represented Germany at the 2024 European Championships in Budapest, Hungary, where she and her teammates placed 4th in the team competition. Simakova competed with two apparatuses, hoop and ribbon, and finished 12th in qualifications with both. At the 2024 German National Championships, she won the bronze medal in the all-around behind teammates Margarita Kolosov and Darja Varfolomeev.

==== 2025 ====
In March 2025, Simakova won the Gymnastik International ahead of Liliana Lewińska. In early April, she was selected to compete at the 2025 Summer World University Games along with her teammate Margarita Kolosov. This was the first time that Germany had sent a team of rhythmic gymnasts to the event. On April 25-27, she competed at the World Cup Tashkent, where she took 18th place in the all-around. She qualified to the ribbon final and won her first World Cup medal (bronze). She then competed at the World Challenge Cup Portimão, finishing 4th in the all-around. She was also 5th in the hoop and ball finals.

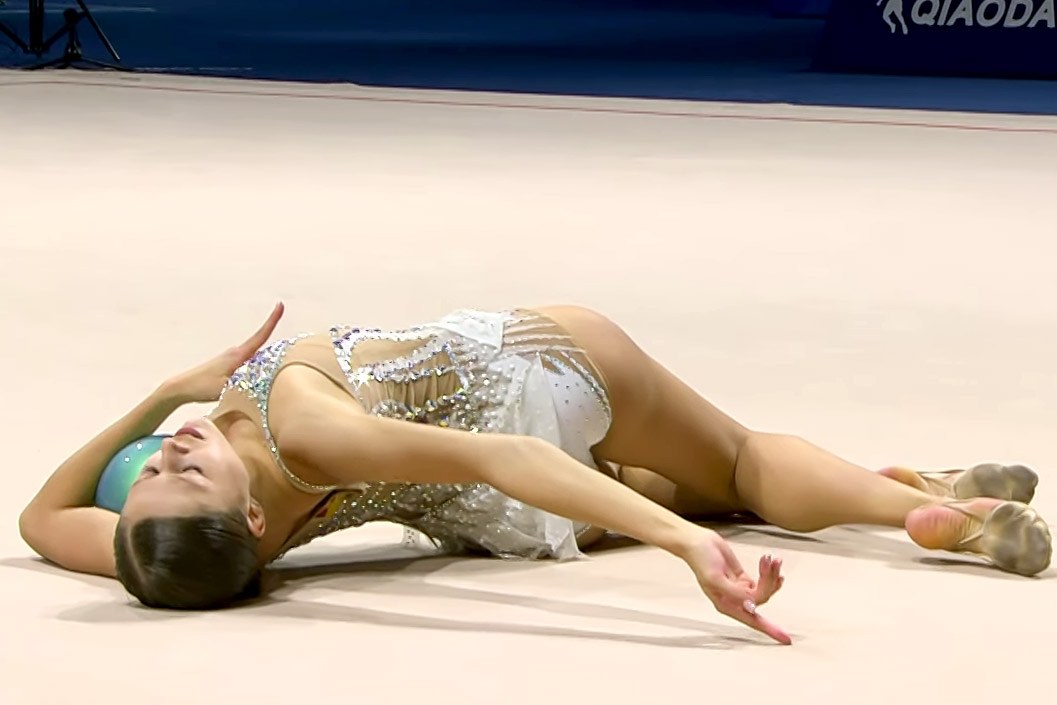
Simakova performing with the ball at the 2025 Summer World University Games

She represented Germany at the 2025 European Championships in Tallinn, Estonia, where she and her teammates placed 4th in the team competition. She was 9th in the all-around final, despite performing to the wrong music in her clubs routine, and won the silver medal behind Stiliana Nikolova in the ball final. In July, she competed at the 2025 Summer World University Games in Rhine-Ruhr, Germany, where she took 4th place in the all-around. She won the silver medal in the all-around behind Darja Varfolomeev at the 2025 German National Championships. In apparatus finals, she won bronze medal with ball and silver with clubs and ribbon.

In August, Simakova made her senior World Championships debut in Rio de Janeiro, Brazil. She took 8th place in all-around qualifications and qualified to two apparatus finals, winning bronze in hoop. Together with Darja Varfolomeev and the German senior group, she won the gold medal in the team competition.

==== 2026 ====
In July, Simakova won the bronze medal in the all-around behind Varfolomeev and Pusch at the German National Championships. She withdrew from the apparatus finals. Afterwards, she was selected to compete at the 2026 World Championships in Frankfurt with one apparatus (ribbon). At the World Championships, she dropped her apparatus twice and did not qualify for the final.

== Routine music information ==
Year	Apparatus	Music title
2026	Hoop	Piano Concerto No. 1 in F-Sharp Minor, Op. 1: I. Vivace by Vladimir Ashkenazy, London Symphony Orchestra & André Previn
2026	Ball	Feeling good by Jennifer Hudson
2026	Clubs	Gravitational Forces INST by Drew J Lerdal, ASCAP
2026	Ribbon	Big Bad Me by Power-Haus, REVANANT
2025	Hoop	Piano Concerto No. 1 in F-Sharp Minor, Op. 1: I. Vivace by Vladimir Ashkenazy, London Symphony Orchestra & André Previn
2025	Ball	Skyfall by Adele
2025	Clubs	Gravitational Forces by ITG Studios
2025	Ribbon	WOMAN by Lady Bri
2024	Hoop	Everybody Wants to Rule the World by Lorde/Monsters by Tommee Profitt
2024	Ball	Crazy in Love by Sofia Karlberg
2024	Clubs	Boombayah by Blackpink
2024	Ribbon	WOMAN by Lady Bri
2023	Hoop	Everybody Wants to Rule the World by Lorde/Monsters by Tommee Profitt
2023	Ball	Another Love by Tom Odell
2023	Clubs	Boombayah by Blackpink
2023	Ribbon	Adiós by Benjamin Clementine
2021	Hoop	The Gypsies; Journey Across Europe / Fanatico Master music from Oxford / KOI by John Corigliano / Edvin Marton & Ari Zakaryan
2021	Ball	Melody from Orpheus and Eurydice by The duet I
2021	Clubs (first)	The Cobra's Dance (feat. Luru) by TSVI
2021	Clubs (second)	Shake Shake by Nessi
2021	Ribbon	Anastasia by Sergey Lazarev
2020	Hoop	The Gypsies; Journey Across Europe / Fanatico Master music from Oxford / KOI by John Corigliano / Edvin Marton & Ari Zakaryan
2020	Ball	24 Préludes op. 28 - No.7 in A Major by Frédéric Chopin
2020	Clubs (first)	Russian Dance from The Nutcracker by Pyotr Tchaikovsky
2020	Clubs (second)	Cuba by Robert Abigail and DJ Rebel ft. The Gibson Brothers
2020	Ribbon	Anastasia by Sergey Lazarev
2019	Rope (first)	Russian Dance from The Nutcracker by Pyotr Tchaikovsky
2019	Rope (second)	Smuglyanka by the Alexandrov Ensemble
2019	Ball	Rond de Jambe à Terre Roudnev, Vol. 3 by Dmitri Roudnev
2019	Clubs	Me Gusta by Adolescent’s Orquesta
2019	Ribbon	

== Competitive highlights ==
(Team competitions in seniors are held only at the World Championships, Europeans and other Continental Games.)

International: Senior
Year	Event	AA	Team	Hoop	Ball	Clubs	Ribbon
2026	World Championships	OC	4th				39th (Q)
2025	World Championships	6th	1st	3rd	13th (Q)	16th (Q)	6th
2025	Summer Universiade	4th		2nd	3rd	26th (Q)	4th
2025	European Championships	9th	4th	14th (Q)	2nd		10th (Q)
2025	World Challenge Cup Portimão	4th		5th	5th	11th (Q)	9th (Q)
2025	World Cup Tashkent	8th		9th (Q)	4th	12th (Q)	3rd
2025	World Cup Sofia	18th		16th (Q)	40th (Q)	21st (Q)	25th (Q)
2024	European Championships		4th	12th (Q)			12th (Q)
International: Junior
Year	Event	AA	Team	Rope	Ball	Clubs	Ribbon
2019	Junior World Championships		1st	1st			
2019	AGF Trophy	1st		1st	1st		
2019	IT Sofia Cup		1st			1st	
2019	IT Andalucia Cup			2nd	3rd		
National
Year	Event	AA	Team	Hoop	Ball	Clubs	Ribbon
2026	German Championships	3rd		WD	WD	WD	WD
2025	German National Championships	2nd			3rd	2nd	2nd
2024	German National Championships	3rd					
Q = Qualifications (Did not advance to Event Final due to the 2 gymnast per country rule, only Top 8 highest score); WR = World Record; WD = Withdrew; NT = No Team Competition; OC = Out of Competition(competed but scores not counted for qualifications/results)

== See also ==
- Nationality changes in gymnastics
