= Azerbaijan at the 2025 Summer World University Games =

- Flag of Azerbaijan
- IOC code: AZE
- National federation: Freewill Student Sport Society of Azerbaijan

in Rhine-Ruhr, Germany 16 July 2025 – 27 July 2025
- Competitors: 71 in 12 sports
- Medals Ranked 24th: Gold 2 Silver 2 Bronze 0 Total 4

Summer World University Games appearances
- 1995; 1997; 1999; 2001; 2003; 2005; 2007; 2009; 2011; 2013; 2015; 2017; 2019; 2021; 2025; 2027

Azerbaijan competed at the 2025 Summer World University Games in Rhine-Ruhr, Germany held from 16 to 27 July 2025. Azerbaijan was represented by 71 athletes and took twenty-fourth place in the medal table with 4 medals.

== Medal summary ==
=== Medal by sports ===
| Rank | Sports | Gold | Silver | Bronze | Total |
|---|---|---|---|---|---|
| 1 | Rhythmic gymnastics | 2 | 1 | 0 | 3 |
| 2 | Judo | 0 | 1 | 0 | 1 |
| Totals (2 entries) | | 2 | 2 | 0 | 4 |

Source: rhineruhr2025.com

=== Medalists ===
| Medal | Name | Sport | Event | Date |
|---|---|---|---|---|
| Gold | Yelyzaveta Luzan; Darya Sorokina; Kamilla Aliyeva; Laman Alimuradova; Gullu Aghalarzade | Rhythmic gymnastics | Group all-around | 18 July |
| Gold | Yelyzaveta Luzan; Darya Sorokina; Kamilla Aliyeva; Laman Alimuradova; Gullu Aghalarzade | Rhythmic gymnastics | Group 5 ribbons | 19 July |
| Silver | Yelyzaveta Luzan; Darya Sorokina; Kamilla Aliyeva; Laman Alimuradova; Gullu Aghalarzade | Rhythmic gymnastics | Group 3 balls + 2 hoops | 19 July |
| Silver | Eljan Hajiyev | Judo | Men -90 kg | 25 July |
