= Diana Doman =

Azerbaijani rhythmic gymnast

- Born: June 22, 1998 (age 28) Estonia
- Spouse: Farhad Ahmadbayli

Gymnastics career
- Discipline: Rhythmic gymnastics
- Country represented: Azerbaijan (2013-2019)
- Club: Ocaq Sport club
- Head coach: Mariana Vasileva
- Retired: yes
Medal record
Representing Azerbaijan
Rhythmic Gymnastics
Event	1st	2nd	3rd
FIG World Cup	4	3	5
Total	4	3	5
European Championships
Silver medal – second place	2014 Baku	3 Balls + 2 Ribbons
Bronze medal – third place	2018 Guadalajara	3 balls + 2 ropes

Diana Ahmadbayli née Doman (born 22 June 1998) is a retired Azerbaijani rhythmic gymnast of Estonian origin. She represented Azerbaijan in international competitions.

== Biography ==
Doman took up gymnastics at age five encouraged by her parents. She moved to Baku, on the initiative of her former coach Natalia Beschastnaya, as the Gymnastics Union of Estonia could not finance her performances on the international stage. Originally spotted by Azerbaijan's head coach Mariana Vasileva in 2012, she accepted her invitation to switch allegiances and in 2013 declared that she would compete for Azerbaijan.

Incorporated into the Azeri senior group she debuted at the World Cup in Debrecen, winning gold in the All-Around and bronze with 3 balls & 2 ribbons. In April the group won silver in the All-Around in Lisbon. In May they won bronze in the All-Around and gold with 5 pairs of clubs in the stage in Tashkent, and 8th overall as well as 7th with 10 clubs in Minsk. A month later she competed in the European Championships in Baku finishing 6th in the All-Around, 6th with 10 clubs and won silver with 3 balls & 2 ribbons. In the World Cup in Sofia they were 13th in the All-Around. In September Diana was selected along Sabina Abbasova, Aynur Mustafayeva, Aliya Pashayeva, Aliaksandra Platonova and Siyana Vasileva, for the World Championships in Izmir. There they took 6th place in the All-Around and 8th in both event finals.

In March 2015 the group took part in the World Cup in Lisbon, being 8th with 5 ribbons and 7th with 3 hoops & 4 clubs. In June she competed in the 2015 European Games Azerbaijan was 11th in the All-Around qualification and did not advance to finals. Two months later Doman, Sabina Abbasova, Nigar Abdusalimova, Aynur Mustafayeva, Aliaksandra Platonova and Siyana Vasileva competed at the World Championships in Stuttgart, being 13th overall, 16th with 10 clubs and 8th with 3 balls & 2 ribbons.

In 2016 she competed at the 2016 Rio Test Event along Ayshan Bayramova, Elif Celep, Aliaksandra Platonova and Siyana Vasileva. They finished in 6th place, thus not earning a spot for the Olympic Games. In June the group participated in the European Championships in Holon, where they took 11th place overall and 8th with 5 ribbons.

In March 2017 Doman won silver in the All-Around and gold in the two event finals at the Grand Prix in Thiais with the group. She was later selected with Ayshan Bayramova, Elif Celep, Aliaksandra Platonova and Siyana Vasileva for the World Championships in Pesaro, being 7th in the All-Around, 6th with 5 hoops and 7th with 3 balls & 2 ropes.

In 2018 she again competed in Thiais, taking bronze in the All-Around. A month later the group took part in the World Cup in Baku, winning bronze in the 5 hoops' final. In May they won bronze in the All-Around, silver with 5 hoops and gold with 3 balls & 2 ropes in the stage in Portimão. In June they participated in the European Championships in Guadalajara, being 7th overall, winning bronze with 3 balls & 2 ropes. At the World Championships in Sofia, Doman, Ayshan Bayramova, Zeynab Hummatova, Aliya Pashayeva and Siyana Vasileva, were 7th overall, 5th with 5 hoops and 7th in the mixed event. In November she married Farhad Ahmadbayli, an employee of the Azerbaijan Gymnastics Federation.

At the 2019 Thiais Grand Prix Azerbaijan won silver with 3 hoops & 4 clubs. During the World Cup in Pesaro the group was 8th in the All-Around, and 6th in the mixed event. In Baku they were 19th overall. In Minsk they were 9th in the All-Around. In Cluj-Napoca they won bronze in the All-Around, silver with 5 hoops and gold with 3 hoops & 4 clubs. Doman was then selected for the World Championships in Baku along Ayshan Bayramova, Zeynab Hummatova, Aliya Pashayeva and Darya Sorokina. There they were 8th in the All-Around and 7th with 3 hoops & 4 clubs. This result earned the Azeri group a spot for the 2020 Olympic Games. In December the Azerbaijan Federation announced that she had retired from the sport.
