= Narmina Samadova =

Azerbaijani rhythmic gymnast

- Born: 10 June 2004 (age 22) Azerbaijan
- Height: 161 cm (5 ft 3 in)

Gymnastics career
- Discipline: Rhythmic gymnastics
- Country represented: Azerbaijan (2018-present)
- Club: Ojaq Sports Club
- Head coaches: Nigar Abdusalimova, Mariana Vasileva

Narmina Samadova (born 10 June 2004) is an Azerbaijani rhythmic gymnast. She represented Azerbaijan at the 2020 Summer Olympics in the group all-around. As an individual, she competed at the 2019 Junior World Championships and the 2018 Junior European Championships.

== Career ==
Samadova began rhythmic gymnastics in 2008.

=== Junior ===
Samadova began her career as an individual rhythmic gymnast. She finished second in the all-around at the 2017 Junior Azerbaijan Championships. At the 2018 Junior European Championships in Guadalajara, Spain, she placed fifth in the hoop event final and eighth in the clubs event final. She also helped the Azerbaijan team place sixth. Then at the 2019 Junior World Championships held in Moscow, she finished seventh in the clubs event final and fifth in the ribbon event final.

=== Senior ===
In 2021, Samadova competed at her first ever World Cup, in Sofia, where she finished in thirty-fifth place in the all-around. Right after, she competed at World Cup Tashkent and placed thirty-third in the all-around. Later, Samadova joined Azerbaijan's senior rhythmic group, replacing Maryam Safarova. At the 2021 European Championships, the group finished sixth in the 5 Balls event final and fourth in the 3 Hoops + 4 Clubs event final in addition to placing seventh in the group all-around and in the team competition. She was then selected to compete at the delayed 2020 Olympic Games alongside Laman Alimuradova, Zeynab Hummatova, Yelyzaveta Luzan, and Darya Sorokina. They finished tenth in the qualification round for the group all-around and were the second reserve for the final. Samadova was replaced by Gullu Aghalarzade in the group for the 2021 World Championships.
