= Bengisu Yıldız =

Turkish artistic gymnast (born 2006)

- Yıldız at the 2021 Islamic Solidarity Games

Personal information
- Born: September 29, 2006 (age 20) Çankaya, Ankara, Turkey

Gymnastics career
- Country represented: Turkey
- Club: Tuna Gym Akademi
- Head coach: Munise Tuna
Medal record
Representing Turkey
Women's artistic gymnastics
Islamic Solidarity Games
Gold medal – first place	2021 Konya	Team
Gold medal – first place	2021 Konya	All-around
Silver medal – second place	2021 Konya	Uneven bars
Bronze medal – third place	2021 Konya	Vault
Bronze medal – third place	2021 Konya	Balance beam
FIG World Cup
Event	1st	2nd	3rd
World Challenge Cup	0	2	1
Total	0	2	1

Bengisu Yıldız (born September 29, 2006) is a Turkish artistic gymnast. She is the 2021 Islamic Solidarity Games all-around champion. She represented Turkey at the 2022, 2023, and 2025 World Championships.

== Junior career ==
=== 2020-2021 ===
Yıldız first competed internationally at the 2020 Junior European Championships. She placed tenth in the all-around and contributed to Turkey's fourth-place finish as a team.

In 2021, Yıldız won gold in the all-around in the junior division of the Turkish Championships, in addition to gold on balance beam and silver on vault, uneven bars, and floor exercise. She also won all-around gold at the Turkish Team Championships later in the year, along with silver on floor and bronze on vault.

== Senior career ==
=== 2022 ===
Yıldız made her senior debut at the 2022 Baku World Cup, competing on vault and uneven bars. The following month, she won the bronze medal with the Turkish team at the ISF Gymnasiade. She also qualified for the vault final, placing fourth.

At the Osijek World Cup in June, Yıldız qualified for the uneven bars final and finished fourth. She was Turkey's top all-around finisher at the 2022 Mediterranean Games, placing eighth, and she also recorded eighth-place finishes in the vault and floor exercise finals.

Yıldız won a total of five medals at the Islamic Solidarity Games in August, including all-around gold ahead of Dildora Aripova of Uzbekistan and teammate Sevgi Kayışoğlu. Turkey also won gold as a team, and Yıldız earned silver on uneven bars as well as bronze medals on vault and balance beam.

Yıldız competing at the 2022 European Championships

Days later, Yıldız competed at the European Championships. Her best individual result was 21st on vault. She placed 59th in the all-around, which allowed her to qualify as an individual to the World Championships later in the year.

Participating in her first senior Turkish Championships, Yıldız won the silver medal in the all-around, along with a bronze on uneven bars. At the Mersin Challenge Cup, held in her home country, she placed fourth in the vault final. In October, she represented Turkey at the 2022 World Championships. Yıldız finished 66th in the all-around, as well as 67th on balance beam.

=== 2023 ===
Yıldız began the 2023 season at the Baku World Cup, where she qualified for the vault final and finished eighth. At the 2023 European Championships, Yıldız was a member of the Turkish team that placed 14th. On vault, she finished ninth in qualification, though she was not eligible to be a reserve for the final due to the two-per-country rule. As in the previous year, she ranked 59th in the all-around, which earned her an individual spot at the World Championships.

In May, Yıldız won her first World Cup medal, a bronze on vault at the Varna Challenge Cup. Later that year, she became the Turkish senior all-around champion, and she also picked up additional titles on vault and uneven bars. She also won her second and third World Cup medals at the Mersin Challenge Cup, with a silver on both vault and floor exercise.

At the 2023 World Championships, Yıldız finished 72nd in the all-around, and her best event result was 72nd on floor exercise. She concluded the year by competing at the Arthur Gander Memorial and Swiss Cup. Yıldız finished ninth at the Arthur Gander Memorial, and she also recorded the second-highest uneven bars score at the competition. At the Swiss Cup, which she attended with teammate Adem Asil, she contributed vault and uneven bars routines towards Turkey's sixth-place finish.

=== 2024 ===
In the spring of 2024, Yıldız competed at the Cairo, Cottbus, and Antalya World Cups, though she did not qualify for any finals. She finished sixth in the all-around at the Turkish Team Championships. In May, she attended the European Championships, placing 51st in the all-around and 19th on vault.

Yıldız won her second senior national all-around title at the 2024 Turkish Championships. She placed in the top two on every apparatus, winning gold on balance beam and floor exercise and silver on vault and uneven bars.

=== 2025 ===
Across March and April of 2025, Yıldız attended the Baku, Antalya, and Osijek World Cups, making the vault final at each. At the Baku World Cup, she recorded a sixth-place finish in the vault final, as well as fifth-place finishes in the balance beam and floor exercise finals.

Yıldız won the gold medal in the all-around at the Turkish Team Championships, with additional gold medals on vault and balance beam. At the European Championships, she finished 39th in the all-around, a significant improvement over her rankings from previous years. At the Tashkent Challenge Cup, she qualified for all four finals, placing fourth on vault and floor exercise.

In July, Yıldız was selected to represent Turkey at the FISU World University Games. The Turkish women's team placed seventh as a team. Individually, Yıldız finished 23rd in the all-around. She also placed eighth on vault during qualification, but was ineligible for the final due to the two-per-country rule.

Shortly after winning the bronze medal on uneven bars at the Turkish Championships, Yıldız participated in the final World Cup event of the year, held in Szombathely, though she did not qualify for any finals. In October, she competed at the World Championships in Jakarta. She placed 68th in the all-around, as well as 43rd on vault.

=== 2026 ===
Yıldız participated in the Baku World Cup in March, competing on balance beam during qualification. At the Antalya World Cup that same month, she qualified for the uneven bars final and placed fifth.

In August, Yıldız competed at the European Championships, though she only performed on uneven bars. She suffered a rough fall during the routine, and though she was not injured, she elected not to finish, resulting in a score of 0.433. That same month, she contributed routines on uneven bars and floor exercise toward Turkey's fifth-place team finish at the 2026 Mediterranean Games. At the Turkish Championships in September, Yıldız won silver medals on vault, uneven bars, and balance beam.

== Competitive history ==
Competitive history of Bengisu Yıldız at the junior level
Year	Event	Team	AA	VT	UB	BB	FX
2020
2020	European Championships	4	10				
2021	Turkish Championships		1st place, gold medalist(s)	2nd place, silver medalist(s)	2nd place, silver medalist(s)	1st place, gold medalist(s)	2nd place, silver medalist(s)
2021	Turkish Team Championships		1st place, gold medalist(s)	3rd place, bronze medalist(s)	8	4	2nd place, silver medalist(s)

Yıldız and Sevgi Kayışoğlu at the 2021 Islamic Solidarity Games

Competitive history of Bengisu Yıldız at the senior level
Year	Event	Team	AA	VT	UB	BB	FX
2022	Baku World Cup						
2022	Gymnasiade	3rd place, bronze medalist(s)		4			
2022	Osijek World Challenge Cup				4		
2022	Mediterranean Games	4	8	8			8
2022	Islamic Solidarity Games	1st place, gold medalist(s)	1st place, gold medalist(s)	3rd place, bronze medalist(s)	2nd place, silver medalist(s)	3rd place, bronze medalist(s)	5
2022	European Championships						
2022	Turkish Championships		2nd place, silver medalist(s)	5	3rd place, bronze medalist(s)	6	4
2022	Mersin World Challenge Cup			4			
2022	World Championships		66		98	67	101
2023	Baku World Cup			8			
2023	European Championships						
2023	Varna World Challenge Cup			3rd place, bronze medalist(s)		4	
2023	Turkish Championships		1st place, gold medalist(s)	1st place, gold medalist(s)	1st place, gold medalist(s)	5	3rd place, bronze medalist(s)
2023	Mersin World Challenge Cup			2nd place, silver medalist(s)			2nd place, silver medalist(s)
2023	World Championships		72		80	131	72
2023	Arthur Gander Memorial		9				
2023	Swiss Cup	6					
2024	Cairo World Cup						
2024	Cottbus World Cup						
2024	Antalya World Cup						
2024	Turkish Team Championships		6				
2024	European Championships						
2024	Turkish Championships		1st place, gold medalist(s)	2nd place, silver medalist(s)	2nd place, silver medalist(s)	1st place, gold medalist(s)	1st place, gold medalist(s)
2025
2025	Baku World Cup			6		5	5
2025	Antalya World Cup			8		6	
2025	Osijek World Cup			8			
2025	Turkish Team Championships		1st place, gold medalist(s)	1st place, gold medalist(s)	3rd place, bronze medalist(s)	1st place, gold medalist(s)	6
2025	European Championships						
2025	Tashkent World Challenge Cup			4	6	5	4
2025	World University Games	7					
2025	Turkish Championships		4	4	3rd place, bronze medalist(s)	6	5
2025	Szombathely World Challenge Cup						
2025	World Championships		68	43	102	94	92
2026
2026	Baku World Cup						
2026	Antalya World Cup				5		
2026	European Championships						
2026	Mediterranean Games	5					
2026	Turkish Championships		4	2nd place, silver medalist(s)	2nd place, silver medalist(s)	2nd place, silver medalist(s)	
