= Kamilla Aliyeva =

Azerbaijani rhythmic gymnast

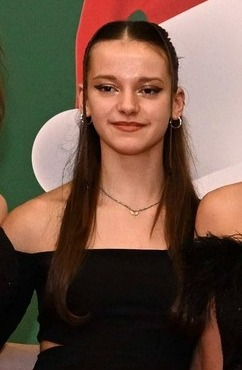

Personal information
- Born: 3 April 2006 (age 20) Azerbaijan

Gymnastics career
- Discipline: Rhythmic gymnastics
- Country represented: Azerbaijan (2022-)
- Club: Ojaq Sports Club
- Head coach: Mariana Vasileva
- Assistant coach: Siyana Vasileva
Medal record
Representing Azerbaijan
Rhythmic Gymnastics
World Championships
Bronze medal – third place	2022 Sofia	3 Ribbons + 2 Balls
European Championships
Gold medal – first place	2023 Baku	3 Ribbons + 2 Balls
Bronze medal – third place	2022 Tel Aviv	Group All-Around
Bronze medal – third place	2022 Tel Aviv	5 Hoops
Bronze medal – third place	2022 Tel Aviv	3 Ribbons + 2 Balls
Bronze medal – third place	2023 Baku	Group All-Around
Islamic Solidarity Games
Gold medal – first place	2021 Konya	Group All-Around
Gold medal – first place	2021 Konya	3 Ribbons + 2 Balls
Silver medal – second place	2021 Konya	5 Hoops
European Cup
Gold medal – first place	2025 Baku	3 Balls + 2 Hoops
Bronze medal – third place	2025 Baku	Cross battle
Bronze medal – third place	2024 Baku	All-around
Bronze medal – third place	2024 Baku	3 Ribbons + 2 Balls
Summer Universiade
Gold medal – first place	2025 Rhine-Rhur	Group All-around
Gold medal – first place	2025 Rhine-Rhur	5 Ribbons
Silver medal – second place	2025 Rhine-Rhur	3 Balls + 2 Hoops

Kamilla Aliyeva (born 3 April 2006) is an Azerbaijani group rhythmic gymnast. She is the 2022 World 3 ribbons + 2 balls bronze medalist and 2022 European group All-Around, 5 hoops and 3 ribbons and 2 balls bronze medalist.

== Career ==
Aliyeva took up the sport at age six after her grandmother saw her walk on her tiptoes and do movements that looked like gymnastics.

Kamilla became age-eligible for senior competition in 2022 and became part of the national group. Between April and May she competed at two World Cups, Baku where the group won gold with 5 hoops and silver in the All-Around, and Pamplona where they won two bronze medals in the two event finals. Then at the European Championships in Tel Aviv, the Azerbaijani group won the bronze medals in the group All-Around, 5 hoops, and 3 ribbons + 2 balls.

She represented Azerbaijan at the 2021 Islamic Solidarity Games where the Azerbaijani group won the gold medal in the all-around. Then in the event finals, they won gold in 3 ribbons + 2 balls and silver in 5 hoops behind Uzbekistan. Aliyeva also competed at the 2022 World Championships alongside Laman Alimuradova, Gullu Aghalarzade, Zeynab Hummatova, Yelyzaveta Luzan, and Darya Sorokina. In the 3 ribbons + 2 balls final, the group won the bronze medal behind Bulgaria and Italy. This marked the first time an Azerbaijani group won a medal at the Rhythmic Gymnastics World Championships.

In 2025, she returned to the national group. She competed at the 2025 European Championships in Tallinn, Estonia. They took 11th place in group all-around and 7th place in 3 Balls + 2 Hoops final. On 17-19 July, Aliyeva and her teammates (Darya Sorokina, Gullu Aghalarzade, Yelyzaveta Luzan and Laman Alimuradova) won gold medal in the Group all-around at the 2025 Summer Universiade in Essen. In the apparatus finals, they won gold in 5 Ribbons and silver in 3 Balls + 2 Hoops .
