= Laman Alimuradova =

Azerbaijani rhythmic gymnast

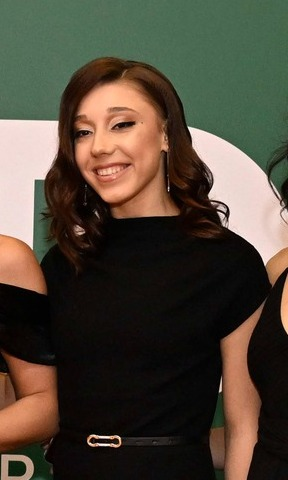
- Alimuradova in 2023

Personal information
- Born: 29 November 2004 (age 21) Azerbaijan
- Height: 152 cm (5 ft 0 in)

Gymnastics career
- Discipline: Rhythmic gymnastics
- Country represented: Azerbaijan (2019-present)
- Club: Specialised Youth Gymnastics School of Olympic Reserve
- Head coach: Mariana Vasileva
- Assistant coach: Siyana Vasileva
Medal record
Representing Azerbaijan
Rhythmic Gymnastics
World Championships
Bronze medal – third place	2022 Sofia	3 Ribbons + 2 Balls
European Championships
Gold medal – first place	2023 Baku	3 Ribbons + 2 Balls
Silver medal – second place	2020 Kyiv	Group All-Around
Bronze medal – third place	2020 Kyiv	Team
Bronze medal – third place	2020 Kyiv	3 Hoops + 4 Clubs
Bronze medal – third place	2022 Tel Aviv	Group All-Around
Bronze medal – third place	2022 Tel Aviv	5 Hoops
Bronze medal – third place	2022 Tel Aviv	3 Ribbons + 2 Balls
Bronze medal – third place	2023 Baku	Group All-Around
Islamic Solidarity Games
Gold medal – first place	2021 Konya	Group All-Around
Gold medal – first place	2021 Konya	3 Ribbons + 2 Balls
Silver medal – second place	2021 Konya	5 Hoops
European Cup
Gold medal – first place	2025 Baku	3 Balls + 2 Hoops
Bronze medal – third place	2025 Baku	Cross battle
Bronze medal – third place	2024 Baku	All-around
Bronze medal – third place	2024 Baku	3 Ribbons + 2 Balls
Summer Universiade
Gold medal – first place	2025 Rhine-Rhur	Group All-around
Gold medal – first place	2025 Rhine-Rhur	5 Ribbons
Silver medal – second place	2025 Rhine-Rhur	3 Balls + 2 Hoops

Laman Alimuradova (Azberbajiani: Ləman Əlimuradova; born 29 November 2004) is an Azerbaijani group rhythmic gymnast. She is the 2022 World 3 ribbons + 2 balls bronze medalist. She is the 2020 European group all-around silver medalist and 2022 European group all-around bronze medalist. She represented Azerbaijan at the 2020 Summer Olympics and at the 2024 Summer Olympics.

== Career ==
Alimuradova began rhythmic gymnastics when she was eight years old.

=== Junior ===
In 2019, she became a part of Azerbaijan junior group and was the group's captain. They competed at the 2019 European Championships in Baku, Azerbaijan, where they placed fifth in group all-around and sixth in 5 Hoops final. She also competed at the 2019 Junior World Championships in Moscow, Russia and placed eighth in group all-around and seventh in 5 Hoops final.

=== Senior ===
Alimuradova became age-eligible for senior competition in 2020. She competed at the 2020 European Championships in Kyiv. Together with Zeynab Hummatova, Darya Sorokina, Yelyzaveta Luzan and Maryam Safarova, she won a silver medal in group all-around and a bronze medal in 3 Hoops + 4 Clubs final. They also won the bronze medal in the team competition together with the juniors.

At the 2021 Sofia World Cup, Alimuradova and the Azerbaijani group won the all-around silver medal and the bronze medal in the 3 Hoops + 4 Clubs final. Then at the Baku World Cup, the group won the bronze medal in the 5 Balls final and placed fourth in the all-around and fifth in the 3 Hoops + 4 Clubs final. Then at the 2021 European Championships, the Azerbaijani group placed seventh in the all-around and team event, sixth in the 5 Balls final, and fourth in the 3 Hoops + 4 Clubs final.

Alimuradova was selected to represent Azerbaijan at the 2020 Summer Olympics alongside Darya Sorokina, Zeynab Hummatova, Yelyzaveta Luzan, and Narmina Samadova. They finished tenth in the qualification round for the group all-around and were the second reserve for the final. She was then selected to compete at the 2021 World Championships. The Azerbaijani group finished sixth in the group all-around and qualified for both event finals. The group finished sixth in both the 5 balls and the 3 hoops + 4 clubs finals.

Alimuradova and the Azerbaijani group won the 5 hoops gold medal and the all-around silver medal at the 2022 Baku World Cup. At the 2022 Pamplona World Challenge Cup, she won three bronze medals in the group all-around, 5 hoops, and 3 ribbons + 2 balls. Then at the European Championships in Tel Aviv, the Azerbaijani group won the bronze medals in the group all-around, 5 hoops, and 3 ribbons + 2 balls. She then represented Azerbaijan at the 2021 Islamic Solidarity Games where the Azerbaijani group won the gold medal in the all-around. Then in the event finals, they won gold in 3 ribbons + 2 balls and silver in 5 hoops behind Uzbekistan.

Alimuradova competed at the 2022 World Championships alongside Gullu Aghalarzade, Zeynab Hummatova, Yelyzaveta Luzan, and Darya Sorokina. In the 3 ribbons + 2 balls final, the group won the bronze medal behind Bulgaria and Italy. This marked the first time an Azerbaijani group won a medal at the Rhythmic Gymnastics World Championships.

She represented Azerbaijan at the 2023 European Championships in her hometown, Baku. She and her teammates won bronze medal in Group all-around and gold in 3 Ribbons + 2 Balls final.

She was selected to represent Azerbaijan at the 2024 Summer Olympics in Paris alongside Yelyzaveta Luzan, Zeynab Hummatova, Darya Sorokina, and Gullu Aghalarzade. They finished 8th in the qualification round for the group all-around and qualified to the group all-around final, ending on 5th place.

On 17-19 July, Sorokina and her teammates (Darya Sorokina, Kamilla Aliyeva, Yelyzaveta Luzan and Gullu Aghalarzade) won gold medal in the Group all-around at the 2025 Summer Universiade in Essen. In the apparatus finals, they won gold in 5 Ribbons and silver in 3 Balls + 2 Hoops .
