= Aynur Mustafayeva =

Azerbaijani rhythmic gymnast

- Born: February 13, 1998 (age 28)

Gymnastics career
- Discipline: Rhythmic gymnastics
- Country represented: Azerbaijan
- Club: Ocaq Sport club
- Retired: yes
Medal record
Representing Azerbaijan
Rhythmic Gymnastics
European Championships
| Silver medal – second place | 2014 Baku | 3 Balls + 2 Ribbons |

Aynur Mustafayeva (born 13 February 1998) is an Azeri retired rhythmic gymnast. She represented her country in international competitions.

== Career ==
Mustafayeva became a senior in 2014 and that year she entered the national senior group. She debuted at the World Cup in Debrecen, winning gold in the All-Around and bronze with 3 balls & 2 ribbons. In April the group won silver in the All-Around in Lisbon. In May they won bronze in the All-Around and gold with 5 pairs of clubs in the stage in Tashkent, and 8th overall as well as 7th with 10 clubs in Minsk. A month later she competed in the European Championships in Baku finishing 6th in the All-Around, 6th with 10 clubs and won silver with 3 balls & 2 ribbons. In the World Cup in Sofia they were 13th in the All-Around. In September Aynur was selected along Sabina Abbasova, Diana Doman, Aliya Pashayeva, Aliaksandra Platonova and Siyana Vasileva, for the World Championships in Izmir. There they took 6th place in the All-Around and 8th in both event finals.

In March 2015 the group took part in the World Cup in Lisbon, being 8th with 5 ribbons and 7th with 3 hoops & 4 clubs. In June she competed in the 2015 European Games Azerbaijan was 11th in the All-Around qualification and did not advance to finals. Two months later Mustafayeva, Sabina Abbasova, Nigar Abdusalimova, Diana Doman, Aliaksandra Platonova and Siyana Vasileva competed at the World Championships in Stuttgart, being 13th overall, 16th with 10 clubs and 8th with 3 balls & 2 ribbons.
