= Yelyzaveta Luzan =

Azerbaijani rhythmic gymnast

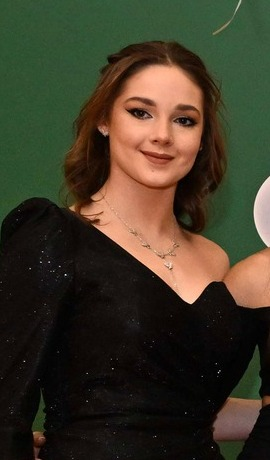
- Luzan at the 2018 Summer Youth Olympics

Personal information
- Nickname: Liza
- Born: 14 March 2003 (age 23) Ukraine
- Height: 156 cm (5 ft 1 in)

Gymnastics career
- Discipline: Rhythmic gymnastics
- Country represented: Azerbaijan; (2018-present)
- Club: Ojaq Sports Club
- Head coach: Mariana Vasileva
- Assistant coach: Siyana Vasileva
Medal record
Representing Azerbaijan
Rhythmic Gymnastics
World Championships
| Bronze medal – third place | 2022 Sofia | 3 Ribbons + 2 Balls |
European Championships
| Gold medal – first place | 2023 Baku | 3 Ribbons + 2 Balls |
| Silver medal – second place | 2020 Kyiv | Group All-Around |
| Bronze medal – third place | 2020 Kyiv | Team |
| Bronze medal – third place | 2020 Kyiv | 3 Hoops + 4 Clubs |
| Bronze medal – third place | 2022 Tel Aviv | Group All-Around |
| Bronze medal – third place | 2022 Tel Aviv | 5 Hoops |
| Bronze medal – third place | 2022 Tel Aviv | 3 Ribbons + 2 Balls |
| Bronze medal – third place | 2023 Baku | Group All-Around |
Islamic Solidarity Games
| Gold medal – first place | 2021 Konya | Group All-Around |
| Gold medal – first place | 2021 Konya | 3 Ribbons + 2 Balls |
| Silver medal – second place | 2021 Konya | 5 Hoops |
European Cup
| Gold medal – first place | 2025 Baku | 3 Balls + 2 Hoops |
| Bronze medal – third place | 2025 Baku | Cross battle |
| Bronze medal – third place | 2024 Baku | All-around |
| Bronze medal – third place | 2024 Baku | 3 Ribbons + 2 Balls |
Summer Universiade
| Gold medal – first place | 2025 Rhine-Rhur | Group All-around |
| Gold medal – first place | 2025 Rhine-Rhur | 5 Ribbons |
| Silver medal – second place | 2025 Rhine-Rhur | 3 Balls + 2 Hoops |
Representing (International Olympic Committee) Mixed-NOCs
Youth Olympic Games
| Gold medal – first place | 2018 Buenos Aires | Mixed team |

Yelyzaveta Luzan (born 14 March 2003) is a Ukrainian-born Azerbaijani rhythmic gymnast. As a member of the Azerbaijan group, she is the 2022 World 3 Ribbons + 2 Balls bronze medalist. She is the 2020 European group all-around silver medalist and 2022 European group all-around bronze medalist. She represented Azerbaijan at the 2020 Summer Olympics and at the 2024 Summer Olympics. As an individual, she represented Azerbaijan at the 2018 Summer Youth Olympics and won a gold medal in the mixed team event.

== Gymnastics career ==
Luzan began rhythmic gymnastics when she was eight years old. In 2014, she moved from Ukraine to Azerbaijan due to family reasons. Her application to switch nationalities and represent Azerbaijan internationally was accepted in 2015.

=== Junior ===
Luzan competed at the 2018 Junior European Championships in Guadalajara, Spain where she placed sixth in the ribbon final and also helped the Azerbaijani team finish sixth. She represented Azerbaijan at the 2018 Youth Olympic Games in Buenos Aires, Argentina, and finished in twenty-second place in the all-around. She also won the gold medal in the mixed team competition.

=== Senior ===
Luzan became age-eligible for senior international competition in 2019. She made her senior international debut at the 2019 Sofia World Cup where she finished fifty-first in the all-around. She made her World Championships debut in 2019 in Baku where she contributed a clubs performance to Azerbaijan's thirteenth place in the team competition.

Luzan began competing with Azerbaijan's senior group in 2020. She competed at the 2020 European Championships in Kyiv. Together with Laman Alimuradova, Darya Sorokina, Zeynab Hummatova and Maryam Safarova, she won a silver medal in group all-around and a bronze medal in 3 Hoops + 4 Clubs final. They also won the bronze medal in the team competition together with the juniors. At the 2021 European Championships, the group finished sixth in the 5 Balls event final and fourth in the 3 Hoops + 4 Clubs event final in addition to placing seventh in the group all-around and in the team competition.

Luzan was selected to represent Azerbaijan at the 2020 Summer Olympics alongside Laman Alimuradova, Zeynab Hummatova, Darya Sorokina, and Narmina Samadova. They finished tenth in the qualification round for the group all-around and were the second reserve for the final. She was then selected to compete at the 2021 World Championships. The Azerbaijani group finished sixth in the group all-around and qualified for both event finals. The group finished sixth in both the 5 balls and the 3 hoops + 4 clubs finals.

Luzan and the Azerbaijani group won the 5 hoops gold medal and the all-around silver medal at the 2022 Baku World Cup. At the 2022 Pamplona World Challenge Cup, she won three bronze medals in the group all-around, 5 hoops, and 3 ribbons + 2 balls. Then at the European Championships in Tel Aviv, the Azerbaijani group won the bronze medals in the group all-around, 5 hoops, and 3 ribbons + 2 balls. She then represented Azerbaijan at the 2021 Islamic Solidarity Games where the Azerbaijani group won the gold medal in the all-around. Then in the event finals, they won gold in 3 ribbons + 2 balls and silver in 5 hoops behind Uzbekistan.

Luzan competed at the 2022 World Championships alongside Gullu Aghalarzade, Laman Alimuradova, Zeynab Hummatova, and Darya Sorokina. In the 3 ribbons + 2 balls final, the group won the bronze medal behind Bulgaria and Italy. This marked the first time an Azerbaijani group won a medal at the Rhythmic Gymnastics World Championships.

She represented Azerbaijan at the 2023 European Championships in her hometown, Baku. She and her teammates won bronze medal in Group all-around and gold in 3 Ribbons + 2 Balls final.

She was selected to represent Azerbaijan at the 2024 Summer Olympics in Paris alongside Laman Alimuradova, Zeynab Hummatova, Darya Sorokina, and Gullu Aghalarzade. They finished 8th in the qualification round for the group all-around and qualified to the group all-around final, ending on 5th place.

On 17-19 July, Sorokina and her teammates (Darya Sorokina, Kamilla Aliyeva, Laman Alimuradova and Gullu Aghalarzade) won gold medal in the Group all-around at the 2025 Summer Universiade in Essen. In the apparatus finals, they won gold in 5 Ribbons and silver in 3 Balls + 2 Hoops .

== See also ==
- Nationality changes in gymnastics
