= Sevgi Kayışoğlu =

Turkish artistic gymnast (born 2005)

- Kayışoğlu at the 2021 Islamic Solidarity Games

Personal information
- Full name: Sevgi Seda Kayışoğlu
- Born: August 15, 2005 (age 21) Bolu, Turkey

Gymnastics career
- Country represented: Turkey
- Club: Bolu Cimnastik Spor Kulübü
- Head coach: Ilkay Uguz
Medal record
Representing Turkey
Women's artistic gymnastics
Islamic Solidarity Games
Gold medal – first place	2021 Konya	Team
Gold medal – first place	2021 Konya	Uneven bars
Bronze medal – third place	2021 Konya	All-around
FIG World Cup
Event	1st	2nd	3rd
World Cup	0	0	2
World Challenge Cup	1	0	1
Total	1	0	3

Sevgi Seda Kayışoğlu (born August 15, 2005) is a Turkish artistic gymnast. She is the 2021 Islamic Solidarity Games uneven bars champion. She represented Turkey at the 2022, 2023, and 2026 World Championships.

== Early life ==
Kayışoğlu began gymnastics at age five, with her parents placing her into the sport due to her high levels of energy. She participated in recreational gymnastics at the Murat Canbaş Gym in Bolu before being discovered by her coach and beginning elite gymnastics. Kayışoğlu later attended Bolu Sports High School to manage her academic and athletic career.

== Junior career ==
=== 2020 ===
Kayışoğlu won silver in the all-around at the Turkish Junior Championships in March of 2020. She also qualified for the balance beam final, which featured both senior and junior athletes, and placed eighth.

In December, Kayışoğlu competed at the European Championships, where she was Turkey's top all-around finisher in seventh place. Turkey finished fourth as a team, and Kayışoğlu qualified for the beam final, ultimately placing fifth.

== Senior career ==
=== 2021 ===
Kayışoğlu made her senior debut at the 2021 Varna Challenge Cup, competing on balance beam and floor exercise.

Later in the year, Kayışoğlu won silver medals on uneven bars, beam, and floor at the Turkish Team Championships, in addition to winning bronze in the all-around and team gold with her club, Bolu CSK.

=== 2022 ===
In March of 2022, Kayışoğlu competed on uneven bars, balance beam, and floor exercise at the Baku World Cup. She qualified for the uneven bars final, placing sixth, and was first reserve for the floor exercise final. The following month, she participated in the ISF Gymnasiade, winning a bronze medal with the Turkish team.

At the Osijek World Challenge Cup in June, Kayışoğlu once again qualified for the uneven bars final, finishing seventh. She next competed at the 2022 Mediterranean Games, where Turkey placed fourth as a team.

Kayışoğlu represented Turkey at the Islamic Solidarity Games in August, contributing to the Turkish team's gold-medal finish. Individually, she won gold on uneven bars, as well as bronze in the all-around behind teammate Bengisu Yıldız and Dildora Aripova of Uzbekistan.

Kayışoğlu competing at the 2022 European Championships

Later that month, Kayışoğlu competed at her first senior European Championships. She placed 54th in the all-around, which allowed her to receive an individual spot for the 2022 World Championships.

At the Turkish Championships, Kayışoğlu won gold in the all-around, her first national all-around title. Additionally, she won gold on balance beam and bronze on floor exercise.

Kayışoğlu won her first World Cup medal in her home country, winning bronze on floor exercise at the Mersin Challenge Cup. She also finished fourth in the uneven bars final.

In October of 2022, Kayışoğlu represented Turkey at the World Championships. In addition to placing 71st in the all-around during qualifications, her best individual event result was 65th on balance beam.

=== 2023 ===
Kayışoğlu began the 2023 season at the Baku World Cup, where she won the bronze medal on floor exercise. A month later, she competed at the European Championships, where the Turkish team placed 14th. Additionally, Kayışoğlu finished 59th in the all-around, which allowed her to qualify for her second World Championships. In May, she attended the Varna Challenge Cup and qualified for the beam final, finishing in ninth place.

At the Turkish Championships in September, Kayışoğlu won silver in the all-around. She then competed at the Mersin Challenge Cup, winning gold on floor. Her final competition of the year was the 2023 World Championships, where she placed 86th in the all-around.

=== 2024-2025 ===
In the spring of 2024, Kayışoğlu attended the Baku, Cottbus, Cairo, and Doha World Cups, competing on uneven bars, balance beam, and floor exercise. At the Cottbus World Cup, she qualified for the floor final and finished fifth.

Kayışoğlu won the gold medal in the all-around at the Turkish Team Championships, receiving a career-best all-around score of 50.633. Her final competition of the year was the European Championships, where Turkey placed 21st as a team.

Due to undergoing and recovering from surgery, Kayışoğlu had a limited 2025 season. She competed only domestically, winning silver on balance beam at the 2025 Turkish Championships.

=== 2026 ===
Kayışoğlu returned to international competition in March of 2026, competing at the Baku, Antalya, and Osijek World Cups and performing on balance beam and floor exercise at each. She won the bronze medal on floor at the Baku World Cup.

In August, Kayışoğlu competed on vault, beam, and floor at the European Championships. Turkey finished 18th as a team, and Kayışoğlu placed 27th on floor exercise. Weeks later, she performed routines on the same three events at the Mediterranean Games. She qualified for the beam final, placing ninth, as well as the floor final, placing fifth. She also competed on beam and floor at the Paris World Challenge Cup, though she did advance to any finals.

Based on her performances in the 2026 World Cup series, Kayışoğlu qualified to the World Championships as a balance beam and floor exercise apparatus specialist. She finished 77th on beam and 66th on floor.

== Competitive history ==
Competitive history of Sevgi Kayışoğlu at the junior level
Year	Event	Team	AA	VT	UB	BB	FX
2020	Turkish Championships		2nd place, silver medalist(s)			8	
2020	European Championships	4	7			5	

Kayışoğlu competing at the 2021 Islamic Solidarity Games

Competitive history of Sevgi Kayışoğlu at the senior level
Year	Event	Team	AA	VT	UB	BB	FX
2021
2021	Varna World Challenge Cup						
2021	Turkish Team Championships	1st place, gold medalist(s)	3rd place, bronze medalist(s)		2nd place, silver medalist(s)	2nd place, silver medalist(s)	2nd place, silver medalist(s)
2022	Baku World Cup				6		R1
2022	Gymnasiade	3rd place, bronze medalist(s)	7		5	6	
2022	Osijek World Challenge Cup				7		
2022	Mediterranean Games	4					
2022	Islamic Solidarity Games	1st place, gold medalist(s)	3rd place, bronze medalist(s)		1st place, gold medalist(s)	5	
2022	European Championships						
2022	Turkish Championships		1st place, gold medalist(s)		8	1st place, gold medalist(s)	3rd place, bronze medalist(s)
2022	Mersin World Challenge Cup				4		3rd place, bronze medalist(s)
2022	World Championships		71		96	65	81
2023	Baku World Cup				7		3rd place, bronze medalist(s)
2023	European Championships						
2023	Varna World Challenge Cup					9	R2
2023	Turkish Championships		2nd place, silver medalist(s)				
2023	Mersin World Challenge Cup				4	5	1st place, gold medalist(s)
2023	World Championships		86		108	117	111
2024	Cairo World Cup						
2024	Cottbus World Cup						5
2024	Baku World Cup						R1
2024	Turkish Team Championships		1st place, gold medalist(s)		5	8	
2024	Doha World Cup						
2024	European Championships						
2025	Turkish Team Championships					6	
2025	Turkish Championships				2nd place, silver medalist(s)		
2026
2026	Baku World Cup						3rd place, bronze medalist(s)
2026	Antalya World Cup						
2026	Osijek World Cup						
2026	European Championships						
2026	Mediterranean Games					9	5
2026	Paris World Challenge Cup						
2026	World Championships					77	66
