= Maryam Safarova =

Azerbaijani rhythmic gymnast (born 2003)

- Born: July 3, 2003 (age 23) Azerbaijan

Gymnastics career
- Discipline: Rhythmic gymnastics
- Country represented: Azerbaijan (2019-2021)
- Club: Ojaq Sports Club
- Head coach: Mariana Vasileva
- Assistant coach: Siyana Vasileva
- Retired: yes
Medal record
Representing Azerbaijan
Rhythmic Gymnastics
European Championships
Silver medal – second place	2020 Kyiv	Group All-Around
Bronze medal – third place	2020 Kyiv	3 Hoops + 4 Clubs
Bronze medal – third place	2020 Kyiv	Team

Maryam Safarova (born July 3, 2003) is an Azerbaijani group rhythmic gymnast. She is the 2020 European Group All-around silver medalist.

== Career ==
=== Senior ===
She made her World Championships debut in 2019 in Baku where she contributed Ribbon performance to 13th place in Team competition.

In 2020, she competed at the 2020 European Championships, her third one. Together with Zeynab Hummatova, Darya Sorokina, Yelyzaveta Luzan and Laman Alimuradova she won silver medal in Group All-around and bronze medal in 3 Hoops + 4 Clubs final. They also won bronze medal in Team competition together with juniors.
