= Ayshan Bayramova =

Azerbaijani rhythmic gymnast

- Born: 24 December 1998 (age 27) Chita, Russia
- Height: 170 cm (5 ft 7 in)

Gymnastics career
- Discipline: Rhythmic gymnastics
- Country represented: Azerbaijan (2015-2019)
- Head coach: Mariana Vasileva
- Retired: yes
Medal record
Rhythmic gymnastics
Representing Azerbaijan
Event	1st	2nd	3rd
FIG World Cup	4	4	3
Total	4	4	3
European Championships
Bronze medal – third place	2018 Guadalajara	3 balls + 2 ropes

Ayshan Bayramova (born 24 December 1998) is a former Azeri rhythmic gymnast, specialised in the group category.

== Personal life ==
Bayramova started her sport career encouraged by her mom, that aimed to become a rhythmic gymnast herself in her youth, along with her twin when she was seven. In addition to the aforementioned twin, Turkan, she has a younger brother, Sarkhan that practises judo. Her childhood idol was Alina Kabaeva, before switching to Yana Kudryavtseva that she called "the ideal gymnast". Her hobbies include watching TV series, taking walks, spending time with friends. Bayramova is studying at the Azerbaijan State Academy of Physical Education and Sport in Baku. In 2016 she was chosen as the ambassador of SmartScoring.

== Gymnastics career ==
Bayramova first competitions in 2015 were the World Cups in Sofia, Tashkent and Budapest as an individual but she didn't make it to finals. She then competed the European Championship in Minsk where the individual team finished in 5th. She was selected for the European Games in 2015, as both individual and group to substitute Gulsum Shafizadeh that was injured. In September she competed at the World Championship in Stuttgart as an individual, her best placement was 5th with the team.

She made the switch to group in 2016, competing at the European Championship in Holon where the group made it to the 5 ribbons final, ending in 8th. Thanks to their result in the championship they were able to attend the Rio Olympics' qualification but they did not get a spot.

In 2017 she first competed in the Berlin World Cup, finishing 8th in the ribbon final. In the summer Bayramova represented Azerbaijan at the World Games, not making any final. At the World Championship in Pesaro she once again competed in both individual and group making the 5 hoops and 3 balls + 2 ribbons finals' finishing 6th and 7th.

In 2018 she was selected for the European Championship in Guadalajara, where the Azeri group won a bronze medal in the 3 balls + 2 ropes final, and the World Championship in Sofia, the group was 7th in the All-Around, 5th in the 5 hoops final and 7th in the 3 balls + 2 ropes final.

In 2019 she was part of the group for the World Championship, they ended 8th in the All-Around taking the last qualifying spot for the 2020 Olympics, 5th in the 5 balls final and 7th in the 3 hoops + 2 clubs final.

In December 2019 the Azerbaijan Gymnastics Federation announced that she had retired from the sport.

== See also ==
- Nationality changes in gymnastics
