= Darya Sorokina =

Azerbaijani rhythmic gymnast

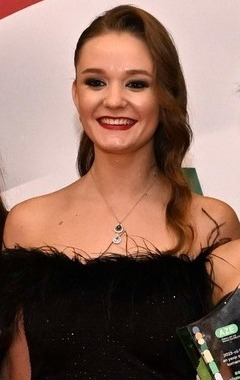
- Sorokina in 2023

Personal information
- Born: 29 November 2002 (age 23) Baku, Azerbaijan
- Height: 168 cm (5 ft 6 in)

Gymnastics career
- Discipline: Rhythmic gymnastics
- Country represented: Azerbaijan (2015-present)
- Club: Ojaq Sports Club
- Head coach: Mariana Vasileva
- Assistant coach: Siyana Vasileva
Medal record
Representing Azerbaijan
Rhythmic Gymnastics
World Championships
Bronze medal – third place	2022 Sofia	3 Ribbons + 2 Balls
European Championships
Gold medal – first place	2023 Baku	3 Ribbons + 2 Balls
Silver medal – second place	2020 Kyiv	Group All-Around
Bronze medal – third place	2020 Kyiv	Team
Bronze medal – third place	2020 Kyiv	3 Hoops + 4 Clubs
Bronze medal – third place	2022 Tel Aviv	Group All-Around
Bronze medal – third place	2022 Tel Aviv	5 Hoops
Bronze medal – third place	2022 Tel Aviv	3 Ribbons + 2 Balls
Bronze medal – third place	2023 Baku	Group All-Around
Islamic Solidarity Games
Gold medal – first place	2021 Konya	Group All-Around
Gold medal – first place	2021 Konya	3 Ribbons + 2 Balls
Silver medal – second place	2021 Konya	5 Hoops
European Cup
Gold medal – first place	2025 Baku	3 Balls + 2 Hoops
Bronze medal – third place	2025 Baku	Cross battle
Bronze medal – third place	2024 Baku	All-around
Bronze medal – third place	2024 Baku	3 Ribbons + 2 Balls
Summer Universiade
Gold medal – first place	2025 Rhine-Rhur	Group All-around
Gold medal – first place	2025 Rhine-Rhur	5 Ribbons
Silver medal – second place	2025 Rhine-Rhur	3 Balls + 2 Hoops

Darya Sorokina (born 29 November 2002) is an Azerbaijani individual and group rhythmic gymnast. She is the 2022 World 3 Ribbons + 2 Balls bronze medalist. She is the 2020 European group all-around silver medalist and the 2022 European group all-around bronze medalist. She represented Azerbaijan at the 2020 Summer Olympics and at the 2024 Summer Olympics.

== Career ==
=== Junior ===
In 2015, Sorokina joined Azerbaijani junior group which competed at the 2015 Junior European Championships in Minsk, Belarus and placed fourth in both the group all-around and 5 Balls finals. Then at the 2017 Junior European Championships in Budapest, Hungary, and finished in ninth place in the group all-around and were the first reserve for the 10 Clubs final. The Azerbaijani team of the junior group, Marina Durunda, and Zhala Piriyeva finished seventh.

=== Senior ===
==== 2018 ====
Sorokina became age-eligible for senior competition in 2018. She switched to competing as an individual gymnast and made her senior international debut at the 2018 Portimao World Challenge Cup, where she took twenty-fifth place in the all-around. She also competed at the 2018 Minsk World Challenge Cup and placed forty-fifth in the all-around. Then at the Kazan World Challenge Cup, she finished twenty-seventh in the all-around. Together with Zohra Aghamirova and Veronika Hudis, she was a part of Azerbaijani team that competed at the 2018 World Championships in Sofia, Bulgaria that finished ninth place in the team competition. Individually, Sokokina finished in sixty-fourth place in the all-around competition.

==== 2019: Switching to group ====
In 2019, she finished in forty-fifth place in the all-around at the 2019 Sofia World Cup. Then she started training with Azerbaijani senior group and appeared at 2019 Cluj-Napoca World Challenge Cup replacing Siyana Vasileva. Her team took the silver medal in the group all-around and 5 Balls and the bronze with 3 Hoops + 4 Clubs. She represented Azerbaijan at the 2019 European Games in Minsk and helped the group finish sixth in the all-around, seventh in 5 Balls, and sixth in 3 Hoops + 4 Clubs. She was also a part of the group that took eighth place in the all-around and seventh in the 3 Hoops + 4 Clubs final at the 2019 World Championships in Baku. The group's eighth-place finish in the all-around qualified Azerbaijan a group spot for the 2020 Olympic Games.

==== 2020 ====
Sorokina competed at the 2020 European Championships in Kyiv. Together with Laman Alimuradova, Zeynab Hummatova, Yelyzaveta Luzan and Maryam Safarova, she won a silver medal in group all-around and a bronze medal in 3 Hoops + 4 Clubs final. They also won the bronze medal in the team competition together with the juniors.

==== 2021 ====
At the 2021 Sofia World Cup, Sorokina and the Azerbaijani group won the all-around silver medal and the bronze medal in the 3 Hoops + 4 Clubs final. Then at the Baku World Cup, the group won the bronze medal in the 5 Balls final and placed fourth in the all-around and fifth in the 3 Hoops + 4 Clubs final. At the 2021 European Championships, the Azerbaijani group placed seventh in the all-around and team event, sixth in the 5 Balls final, and fourth in the 3 Hoops + 4 Clubs final.

Sorokina was selected to represent Azerbaijan at the 2020 Summer Olympics alongside Laman Alimuradova, Zeynab Hummatova, Yelyzaveta Luzan, and Narmina Samadova. They finished tenth in the qualification round for the group all-around and were the second reserve for the final. She was then selected to compete at the 2021 World Championships. The Azerbaijani group finished sixth in the group all-around and qualified for both event finals. The group finished sixth in both the 5 balls and the 3 hoops + 4 clubs finals.

==== 2022 ====
Sorokina and the Azerbaijani group won the 5 hoops gold medal and the all-around silver medal at the 2022 Baku World Cup. At the 2022 Pamplona World Challenge Cup, she won three bronze medals in the group all-around, 5 hoops, and 3 ribbons + 2 balls. Then at the European Championships in Tel Aviv, the Azerbaijani group won the bronze medals in the group all-around, 5 hoops, and 3 ribbons + 2 balls. She then represented Azerbaijan at the 2021 Islamic Solidarity Games where the Azerbaijani group won the gold medal in the all-around. Then in the event finals, they won gold in 3 ribbons + 2 balls and silver in 5 hoops behind Uzbekistan.

Sorokina competed at the 2022 World Championships alongside Laman Alimuradova, Gullu Aghalarzade, Zeynab Hummatova, and Yelyzaveta Luzan. In the 3 ribbons + 2 balls final, the group won the bronze medal behind Bulgaria and Italy. This marked the first time an Azerbaijani group won a medal at the Rhythmic Gymnastics World Championships.

==== 2023 ====
She represented Azerbaijan at the 2023 European Championships in her hometown, Baku. She and her teammates won bronze medal in Group all-around and gold in 3 Ribbons + 2 Balls final.

==== 2024 ====
She was selected to represent Azerbaijan at the 2024 Summer Olympics in Paris alongside Laman Alimuradova, Zeynab Hummatova, Yelyzaveta Luzan, and Gullu Aghalarzade. They finished 8th in the qualification round for the group all-around and qualified to the group all-around final, ending on 5th place.

==== 2025 ====
In 2025, she competed at the 2025 European Championships in Tallinn, Estonia. They took 11th place in group all-around and 7th place in 3 Balls + 2 Hoops final. On 17-19 July, Sorokina and her teammates (Yelyzaveta Luzan, Kamilla Aliyeva, Laman Alimuradova and Gullu Aghalarzade) won gold medal in the Group all-around at the 2025 Summer Universiade in Essen. In the apparatus finals, they won gold in 5 Ribbons and silver in 3 Balls + 2 Hoops .
