= Azerbaijan at the 2020 Summer Olympics =

- IOC code: AZE
- NOC: National Olympic Committee of the Republic of Azerbaijan
- Website: www.olympic.az (in Azerbaijani and English)

in Tokyo, Japan
- Competitors: 44 in 13 sports
- Flag bearers (opening): Rustam Orujov; Farida Azizova
- Flag bearer (closing): Haji Aliyev
- Medals Ranked 67th: Gold 0 Silver 3 Bronze 4 Total 7

Summer Olympics appearances (overview)
- 1996; 2000; 2004; 2008; 2012; 2016; 2020; 2024

Other related appearances
- Russian Empire (1900–1912); Soviet Union (1952–1988); Unified Team (1992)

Azerbaijan competed at the 2020 Summer Olympics in Tokyo. Originally scheduled to take place from 24 July to 9 August 2020, the Games were postponed to 23 July to 8 August 2021, because of the COVID-19 pandemic. It was the nation's seventh consecutive appearance at the Summer Olympics in the post-Soviet era. For the first time since the nation's debut at Atlanta 1996, the Azerbaijan failed to win a single Olympic gold medal.

== Medalists ==
| Medal | Name | Sport | Event | Date |
|---|---|---|---|---|
| Silver | Rafael Aghayev | Karate | Men's 75 kg | 6 August |
| Silver | Haji Aliyev | Wrestling | Men's freestyle 65 kg | 7 August |
| Silver | Irina Zaretska | Karate | Women's +61 kg | 7 August |
| Bronze | Iryna Kindzerska | Judo | Women's +78 kg | 30 July |
| Bronze | Loren Alfonso | Boxing | Men's light heavyweight | 1 August |
| Bronze | Rafig Huseynov | Wrestling | Men's Greco-Roman 77 kg | 3 August |
| Bronze | Mariya Stadnik | Wrestling | Women's freestyle 50 kg | 7 August |

== Competitors ==
The following is the list of number of competitors participating in the Games:

| Sport | Men | Women | Total |
|---|---|---|---|
| Athletics | 1 | 1 | 2 |
| Badminton | 1 | 0 | 1 |
| Boxing | 5 | 0 | 5 |
| Cycling | 1 | 0 | 1 |
| Fencing | 0 | 1 | 1 |
| Gymnastics | 1 | 7 | 8 |
| Judo | 7 | 2 | 9 |
| Karate | 2 | 1 | 3 |
| Shooting | 2 | 0 | 2 |
| Swimming | 1 | 1 | 2 |
| Taekwondo | 1 | 1 | 2 |
| Triathlon | 1 | 0 | 1 |
| Wrestling | 5 | 2 | 7 |
| Total | 28 | 16 | 44 |

== Athletics ==
Azerbaijani athletes further achieved the entry standards, either by qualifying time or by world ranking, in the following track and field events (up to a maximum of 3 athletes in each event):

Key

- Note–Ranks given for track events are within the athlete's heat only
- Q = Qualified for the next round
- q = Qualified for the next round as a fastest loser or, in field events, by position without achieving the qualifying target
- NR = National record
- N/A = Round not applicable for the event
- Bye = Athlete not required to compete in round

Field events

| Athlete | Event | Qualification | | Final | |
| Athlete | Event | Distance | Position | Distance | Position |
|---|---|---|---|---|---|
| Nazim Babayev | Men's triple jump | 16.72 | 15 | Did not advance | |
| Hanna Skydan | Women's hammer throw | 69.57 | 16 | Did not advance | |

== Badminton ==
Azerbaijan entered one badminton player into the Olympic tournament. Indonesian-born Ade Resky Dwicahyo secured the men's singles spot based on the BWF Race to Tokyo Rankings. This is for the first time, Azerbaijan will be represented in badminton at the Summer Olympics.

| Athlete | Event | Group stage | | | Elimination | Quarterfinal | Semifinal | Final / BM | |
| Athlete | Event | Opposition Score | Opposition Score | Rank | Opposition Score | Opposition Score | Opposition Score | Opposition Score | Rank |
|---|---|---|---|---|---|---|---|---|---|
| Ade Resky Dwicahyo | Men's singles | Nguyễn (VIE); W 2–0 (21–14, 21–18) | Antonsen (DEN); L 0–2 (16–21, 15–21) | 2 | Did not advance | | | | |

== Boxing ==
Azerbaijan entered one male boxer into the Olympic tournament. Fourth-seeded Tayfur Aliyev scored a round-of-16 victory to secure a spot in the men's featherweight division at the 2020 European Qualification Tournament in London, United Kingdom.

| Athlete | Event | Round of 32 | Round of 16 | Quarterfinals | Semifinals | Final | |
| Athlete | Event | Opposition Result | Opposition Result | Opposition Result | Opposition Result | Opposition Result | Rank |
|---|---|---|---|---|---|---|---|
| Tayfur Aliyev | Men's featherweight | Văn Đương (VIE); L 2–3 | Did not advance | | | | |
| Javid Chalabiyev | Men's lightweight | Khartsyz (UKR); W 5–0 | Bachkov (ARM); L 1–4 | Did not advance | | | |
| Lorenzo Sotomayor | Men's welterweight | Madiev (GEO); L RSC-I | Did not advance | | | | |
| Loren Alfonso | Men's light heavyweight | Bye | Ruzmetov (UZB); W 4–1 | Malkan (TUR); W 5–0 | López (CUB); L 0–5 | Did not advance | 3rd place, bronze medalist(s) |
| Mahammad Abdullayev | Men's super heavyweight | Latypov (BRN); W 3–1 | Jalolov (UZB); L 0–5 | Did not advance | | | |

== Cycling ==
=== Road ===
Azerbaijan entered one rider to compete in the men's Olympic road race, by virtue of his top 50 national finish (for men) in the UCI World Ranking.

| Athlete | Event | Time | Rank |
|---|---|---|---|
| Elchin Esedov | Men's road race | DNF | |

== Fencing ==
Azerbaijan entered one fencer into the Olympic competition. Anna Bashta claimed a spot in the women's sabre by winning the final match at the European Zonal Qualifier in Madrid, Spain.

| Athlete | Event | Round of 64 | Round of 32 | Round of 16 | Quarterfinal | Semifinal | Final / BM | |
| Athlete | Event | Opposition Score | Opposition Score | Opposition Score | Opposition Score | Opposition Score | Opposition Score | Rank |
|---|---|---|---|---|---|---|---|---|
| Anna Bashta | Women's sabre | Bye | Stone (USA); W 15–9 | Nikitina (ROC); L 13–15 | Did not advance | | | |

== Gymnastics ==
=== Artistic ===
Azerbaijan entered two artistic gymnasts into the Olympic competition. İvan Tixonov and Marina Nekrasova received a spare berth each from the men's and women's apparatus events, respectively, as one of the highest-ranked gymnasts, neither part of the team nor qualified directly through the all-around, at the 2019 World Championships in Stuttgart, Germany.

Men

| Athlete | Event | Qualification | | | | | | | | Final | | | | | | | |
| Athlete | Event | Apparatus | | | | | | Total | Rank | Apparatus | | | | | | Total | Rank |
| Athlete | Event | F | PH | R | V | PB | HB | Total | Rank | F | PH | R | V | PB | HB | Total | Rank |
|---|---|---|---|---|---|---|---|---|---|---|---|---|---|---|---|---|---|
| İvan Tixonov | All-around | 13.233 | 13.366 | 14.200 | 13.600 | 12.766 | 13.133 | 80.298 | 45 | Did not advance | | | | | | | |

Women

| Athlete | Event | Qualification | | | | | | Final | | | | | |
| Athlete | Event | Apparatus | | | | Total | Rank | Apparatus | | | | Total | Rank |
| Athlete | Event | V | UB | BB | F | Total | Rank | V | UB | BB | F | Total | Rank |
|---|---|---|---|---|---|---|---|---|---|---|---|---|---|
| Marina Nekrasova | All-around | 13.133 | 10.833 | 12.266 | 12.000 | 48.232 | 70 | Did not advance | | | | | |

=== Rhythmic ===
Azerbaijan qualified a squad of rhythmic gymnasts for the individual and group all-around by finishing in the top 16 (for individual) and top 5 (for group), respectively, at the 2019 World Championships in Baku. Zohra Aghamirova was announced as the individual on 27 June 2021.

| Athlete | Event | Qualification | | | | | | Final | | | | | |
| Athlete | Event | Hoop | Ball | Clubs | Ribbon | Total | Rank | Hoop | Ball | Clubs | Ribbon | Total | Rank |
|---|---|---|---|---|---|---|---|---|---|---|---|---|---|
| Zohra Aghamirova | Individual | 23.000 | 23.400 | 21.500 | 19.900 | 87.800 | 18 | Did not advance | | | | | |

| Athletes | Event | Qualification | | | | Final | | | |
| Athletes | Event | 5 apps | 3+2 apps | Total | Rank | 5 apps. | 3+2 apps | Total | Rank |
|---|---|---|---|---|---|---|---|---|---|
| Laman Alimuradova; Zeynab Hummatova; Yelyzaveta Luzan; Narmina Samadova; Darya Sorokina | Group | 36.700 | 37.650 | 74.350 | 10 | Did not advance | | | |

== Judo ==
Azerbaijan entered eight judoka (seven men and one woman) into the Olympic tournament based on the International Judo Federation Olympics Individual Ranking.

Men

| Athlete | Event | Round of 64 | Round of 32 | Round of 16 | Quarterfinals | Semifinals | Repechage | Final / BM | |
| Athlete | Event | Opposition Result | Opposition Result | Opposition Result | Opposition Result | Opposition Result | Opposition Result | Opposition Result | Rank |
|---|---|---|---|---|---|---|---|---|---|
| Karamat Huseynov | −60 kg | —N/a | McKenzie (GBR); W 10–00 | Chkhvimiani (GEO); L 00–10 | Did not advance | | | | |
| Orkhan Safarov | −66 kg | —N/a | Serikzhanov (KAZ); L 00–10 | Did not advance | | | | | |
| Rustam Orujov | −73 kg | Bye | Mogushkov (ROC); W 11–00 | Makhmadbekov (TJK); W 11–00 | Ono (JPN); L 00–10 | Did not advance | Gjakova (KOS); W 11–00 | An C-r (KOR); L 00–11 | 5 |
| Murad Fatiyev | −81 kg | Bye | Harris (SLE); W 10–00 | Mollaei (MGL); L 00–10 | Did not advance | | | | |
| Mammadali Mehdiyev | −90 kg | Bye | Bozbayev (KAZ); W 10–00 | Igolnikov (ROC); L 00–11 | Did not advance | | | | |
| Zelym Kotsoiev | −100 kg | —N/a | Iddir (FRA); W 11–00 | El Nahas (CAN); L 00–10 | Did not advance | | | | |
| Ushangi Kokauri | +100 kg | —N/a | Sarnacki (POL); W 10–00 | Silva (BRA); L 00–10 | Did not advance | | | | |

Women

| Athlete | Event | Round of 32 | Round of 16 | Quarterfinals | Semifinals | Repechage | Final / BM | |
| Athlete | Event | Opposition Result | Opposition Result | Opposition Result | Opposition Result | Opposition Result | Opposition Result | Rank |
|---|---|---|---|---|---|---|---|---|
| Aisha Gurbanli | −48 kg | Costa (POR); L 00–11 | Did not advance | | | | | |
| Iryna Kindzerska | +78 kg | Bye | Cerić (BIH); W 10–00 | Han M-j (KOR); W 11–00 | Sone (JPN); L 00–10 | Bye | Xu Sy (CHN); W 10–00 | 3rd place, bronze medalist(s) |

== Karate ==
Azerbaijan entered two karateka into the inaugural Olympic tournament. World champions Rafael Aghayev (men's 75 kg) and Irina Zaretska (women's +61 kg) qualified directly for their respective kumite categories by finishing among the top four karateka at the end of the combined WKF Olympic Rankings.

Kumite

| Athlete | Event | Group stage | | | | | Semifinals | Final | |
| Athlete | Event | Opposition Result | Opposition Result | Opposition Result | Opposition Result | Rank | Opposition Result | Opposition Result | Rank |
|---|---|---|---|---|---|---|---|---|---|
| Firdovsi Farzaliyev | Men's –67kg | Şamdan (TUR); L 1–7 | Sago (JPN); W 1–0 | Assadilov (KAZ); L 2–6 | El-Sawy (EGY); L 0–1 | 5 | Did not advance | | |
| Rafael Aghayev | Men's −75 kg | Bitsch (GER); W 2–1 | Yahiro (AUS); W 5–0 | Azhikanov (KAZ); W 3–2 | Busà (ITA); L 1–3 | 2 Q | Hárspataki (HUN); W 7–0 | Busà (ITA); L 0–1 | 2nd place, silver medalist(s) |
| Irina Zaretska | Women's +61 kg | Uekusa (JPN); W 4–1 | Semeraro (ITA); W 3–2 | Berultseva (KAZ); L 4–5 | Hocaoğlu (TUR); W 4–0 | 1 Q | Gong L (CHN); W 7–2 | Abdelaziz (EGY); L 0–2 | 2nd place, silver medalist(s) |

== Shooting ==
Azerbaijani shooters achieved quota places for the following events by virtue of their best finishes at the 2018 ISSF World Championships, the 2019 ISSF World Cup series, European Championships or Games, and European Qualifying Tournament, as long as they obtained a minimum qualifying score (MQS) by May 31, 2020.

| Athlete | Event | Qualification | | Final | |
| Athlete | Event | Points | Rank | Points | Rank |
|---|---|---|---|---|---|
| Emin Jafarov | Men's skeet | 116 | 26 | Did not advance | |
| Ruslan Lunev | Men's 10 m air pistol | 574 | 20 | Did not advance | |
| Ruslan Lunev | Men's 25 m rapid fire pistol | 567 | 21 | Did not advance | |

== Swimming ==
Azerbaijani swimmers further achieved qualifying standards in the following events (up to a maximum of 2 swimmers in each event at the Olympic Qualifying Time (OQT), and potentially 1 at the Olympic Selection Time (OST)):

| Athlete | Event | Heat | | Semifinal | | Final | |
| Athlete | Event | Time | Rank | Time | Rank | Time | Rank |
|---|---|---|---|---|---|---|---|
| Maksym Shemberev | Men's 400 m individual medley | 4:19.40 | 26 | —N/a | | Did not advance | |
| Maryam Sheikh Alizadeh | Women's 100 m butterfly | 1:01.37 | 30 | Did not advance | | | |

== Taekwondo ==
Azerbaijan entered two athletes into the taekwondo competition at the Games. Rio 2016 Olympian Milad Beigi qualified directly for the second time in the men's welterweight category (80 kg) by finishing among the top five taekwondo practitioners at the end of the WT Olympic Rankings. Meanwhile, two-time Olympian Farida Azizova scored a semifinal victory in the women's welterweight category (67 kg) to book the remaining spot on the Azerbaijani taekwondo squad at the 2021 European Qualification Tournament in Sofia, Bulgaria.

| Athlete | Event | Round of 16 | Quarterfinals | Semifinals | Repechage | Final / BM | |
| Athlete | Event | Opposition Result | Opposition Result | Opposition Result | Opposition Result | Opposition Result | Rank |
|---|---|---|---|---|---|---|---|
| Milad Beigi | Men's −80 kg | Liu W-t (TPE); W 15–11 | Rafalovich (UZB); L 1–12 | Did not advance | | | |
| Farida Azizova | Women's –67 kg | McPherson (USA); L 5–8 | Did not advance | | | | |

== Triathlon ==
| Athlete | Event | Swim (1.5 km) | Trans 1 | Bike (40 km) | Trans 2 | Run (10 km) | Total Time | Rank |
|---|---|---|---|---|---|---|---|---|
| Rostyslav Pevtsov | Men's | 18:27 (46) | 19:06 (45) | 1:16:56 (41) | 1:17:29 (42) | 1:41:35 (41) | 1:50:46 | 41 |

== Wrestling ==
Azerbaijan qualified seven wrestlers for each of the following weight classes into the Olympic competition. Two of them finished among the top six to book Olympic spots in the men's freestyle 97 kg and women's freestyle 50 kg at the 2019 World Championships, while three additional licenses were awarded to the Azerbaijani wrestlers, who progressed to the top two finals of their respective weight categories at the 2021 European Olympic Qualification Tournament in Budapest, Hungary. Two Azerbaijani wrestlers claimed one of the remaining slots each in the men's Greco-Roman 77 kg and women's freestyle 68 kg, respectively to complete the nation's roster at the 2021 World Qualification Tournament in Sofia, Bulgaria.

Key:

- VT (ranking points: 5–0 or 0–5) – Victory by fall.
- VB (ranking points: 5–0 or 0–5) – Victory by injury (VF for forfeit, VA for withdrawal or disqualification)
- PP (ranking points: 3–1 or 1–3) – Decision by points – the loser with technical points.
- PO (ranking points: 3–0 or 0–3) – Decision by points – the loser without technical points.
- ST (ranking points: 4–0 or 0–4) – Great superiority – the loser without technical points and a margin of victory of at least 8 (Greco-Roman) or 10 (freestyle) points.
- SP (ranking points: 4–1 or 1–4) – Technical superiority – the loser with technical points and a margin of victory of at least 8 (Greco-Roman) or 10 (freestyle) points.

Freestyle

| Athlete | Event | Round of 16 | Quarterfinal | Semifinal | Repechage | Final / BM | |
| Athlete | Event | Opposition Result | Opposition Result | Opposition Result | Opposition Result | Opposition Result | Rank |
|---|---|---|---|---|---|---|---|
| Haji Aliyev | Men's –65 kg | Diatta (SEN); W 3–0 ^{PO} | Niyazbekov (KAZ); W 3–1 ^{PP} | Punia (IND); W 3–1 ^{PP} | Bye | Otoguro (JPN); L 1–3 ^{PP} | 2nd place, silver medalist(s) |
| Turan Bayramov | Men's –74 kg | Mykhailov (UKR); W 3–1 ^{PP} | Chamizo (ITA); L 1–3 ^{PP} | Did not advance | | | 8 |
| Sharif Sharifov | Men's −97 kg | Sadulaev (ROC); L 0–3 ^{PO} | Did not advance | | Odikadze (GEO); W 3–1 ^{PP} | Salas (CUB); L 1–3 ^{PP} | 5 |
| Mariya Stadnik | Women's −50 kg | Orshush (ROC); W 3–1 ^{PP} | Hamdi (TUN); W 4–0 ^{ST} | Susaki (JPN); L 0–4 ^{ST} | Bye | Tsogt-Ochir (MGL); W 4–0 ^{ST} | 3rd place, bronze medalist(s) |
| Elis Manolova | Women's −68 kg | Oborududu (NGR); L 1–4 ^{SP} | Did not advance | | Zhumanazarova (KGZ); L 1–3 ^{PP} | Did not advance | 10 |

Greco-Roman

| Athlete | Event | Round of 16 | Quarterfinal | Semifinal | Repechage | Final / BM | |
| Athlete | Event | Opposition Result | Opposition Result | Opposition Result | Opposition Result | Opposition Result | Rank |
|---|---|---|---|---|---|---|---|
| Rafig Huseynov | Men's –77 kg | Kessidis (SWE); W 3–1 ^{PP} | Makhmudov (KGZ); L 1–4 ^{SP} | Did not advance | Maafi (TUN); W 4–1 ^{SP} | Chalyan (ARM); W 3–1 ^{PP} | 3rd place, bronze medalist(s) |
| Islam Abbasov | Men's –87 kg | Grégorich (CUB); L 1–3 ^{PP} | Did not advance | | | | 13 |

== See also ==
- Azerbaijan at the 2020 Summer Paralympics
