= Gullu Aghalarzade =

Azerbaijani rhythmic gymnast

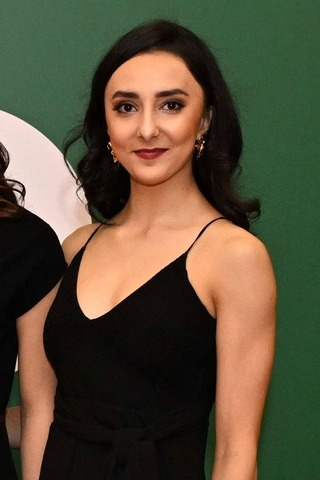
- Aghalarzade in 2023

Personal information
- Born: 25 October 2003 (age 22) Azerbaijan

Gymnastics career
- Discipline: Rhythmic gymnastics
- Country represented: Azerbaijan
- Club: Ojaq Sports Club
- Head coach: Mariana Vasileva
- Assistant coach: Siyana Vasileva
Medal record
Representing Azerbaijan
Rhythmic Gymnastics
World Championships
Bronze medal – third place	2022 Sofia	3 Ribbons + 2 Balls
European Championships
Gold medal – first place	2023 Baku	3 Ribbons + 2 Balls
Bronze medal – third place	2022 Tel Aviv	Group All-Around
Bronze medal – third place	2022 Tel Aviv	5 Hoops
Bronze medal – third place	2022 Tel Aviv	3 Ribbons + 2 Balls
Bronze medal – third place	2023 Baku	Group All-Around
Islamic Solidarity Games
Gold medal – first place	2021 Konya	Group All-Around
Gold medal – first place	2021 Konya	3 Ribbons + 2 Balls
Silver medal – second place	2021 Konya	5 Hoops
European Cup
Bronze medal – third place	2024 Baku	All-around
Bronze medal – third place	2024 Baku	3 Ribbons + 2 Balls
Summer Universiade
Gold medal – first place	2025 Rhine-Rhur	Group All-around
Gold medal – first place	2025 Rhine-Rhur	5 Ribbons
Silver medal – second place	2025 Rhine-Rhur	3 Balls + 2 Hoops

Gullu Aghalarzade (Azerbaijani: Güllü Ağalarzadə; born 25 October 2003) is an Azerbaijani group rhythmic gymnast. She is the 2022 World bronze medalist in 3 ribbons + 2 balls. She won three bronze medals at the 2022 European Championships. She represented Azerbaijan at the 2024 Summer Olympics.

== Career ==
Aghalarzade competed at the 2017 Junior European Championships, and the group finished ninth in the qualification round of 10 clubs, making them the first reserve for the final.

Aghalarzade became age-eligible for senior competition in 2019. At the 2019 Moscow Grand Prix, the Azerbaijani group placed fifth in the all-around and sixth in both the 5 balls and 3 hoops + 4 clubs finals. Then at the Grand Prix Final in Kyiv, the group finished seventh in the all-around, 5 balls, and 3 hoops + 4 clubs.

Aghalarzade represented Azerbaijan at the 2021 Islamic Solidarity Games where the Azerbaijani group won the gold medal in the all-around. Then in the event finals, they won gold in 3 ribbons + 2 balls and silver in 5 hoops behind Uzbekistan. She was selected to compete at the 2021 World Championships. The Azerbaijani group finished sixth in the group all-around and qualified for both event finals. The group finished sixth in both the 5 balls and the 3 hoops + 4 clubs finals.

Aghalarzade and the Azerbaijani group won the 5 hoops gold medal and the all-around silver medal at the 2022 Baku World Cup. At the 2022 Pamplona World Challenge Cup, she won three bronze medals in the group all-around, 5 hoops, and 3 ribbons + 2 balls. Then at the European Championships in Tel Aviv, the Azerbaijani group won the bronze medals in the group all-around, 5 hoops, and 3 ribbons + 2 balls.

Aghalarzade competed at the 2022 World Championships alongside Laman Alimuradova, Zeynab Hummatova, Yelyzaveta Luzan, and Darya Sorokina. In the 3 ribbons + 2 balls final, the group won the bronze medal behind Bulgaria and Italy. This marked the first time an Azerbaijani group won a medal at the Rhythmic Gymnastics World Championships.

She represented Azerbaijan at the 2023 European Championships in her hometown, Baku. She and her teammates won bronze medal in Group all-around and gold in 3 Ribbons + 2 Balls final.

She was selected to represent Azerbaijan at the 2024 Summer Olympics in Paris alongside Yelyzaveta Luzan, Zeynab Hummatova, Darya Sorokina, and Laman Alimuradova. They finished 8th in the qualification round for the group all-around and qualified to the group all-around final, ending on 5th place.

On 17-19 July, Sorokina and her teammates (Darya Sorokina, Kamilla Aliyeva, Yelyzaveta Luzan and Laman Alimuradova) won gold medal in the Group all-around at the 2025 Summer Universiade in Essen. In the apparatus finals, they won gold in 5 Ribbons and silver in 3 Balls + 2 Hoops .
