= Zeynab Hummatova =

Azerbaijani rhythmic gymnast

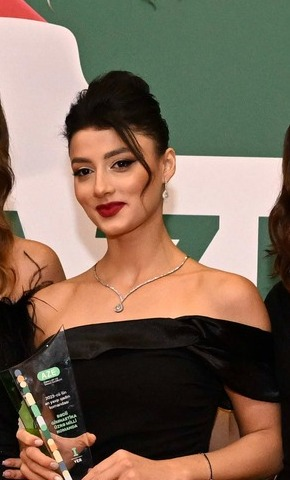
- Hummatova in 2023

Personal information
- Born: 6 December 1999 (age 26) Shaki, Azerbaijan
- Height: 166 cm (5 ft 5 in)

Gymnastics career
- Discipline: Rhythmic gymnastics
- Country represented: Azerbaijan; (2018-2024)
- Club: Ojaq Sports Club
- Head coach: Mariana Vasileva
- Assistant coach: Siyana Vasileva
Medal record
Rhythmic Gymnastics
Representing Azerbaijan
World Championships
Bronze medal – third place	2022 Sofia	3 Ribbons + 2 Balls
European Championships
Gold medal – first place	2023 Baku	3 Ribbons + 2 Balls
Silver medal – second place	2020 Kyiv	Group All-Around
Bronze medal – third place	2018 Guadalajara	3 Balls + 2 Ropes
Bronze medal – third place	2020 Kyiv	Team
Bronze medal – third place	2020 Kyiv	3 Hoops + 4 Clubs
Bronze medal – third place	2022 Tel Aviv	Group All-Around
Bronze medal – third place	2022 Tel Aviv	5 Hoops
Bronze medal – third place	2022 Tel Aviv	3 Ribbons + 2 Balls
Bronze medal – third place	2023 Baku	Group All-Around
Islamic Solidarity Games
Gold medal – first place	2021 Konya	Group All-Around
Gold medal – first place	2021 Konya	3 Ribbons + 2 Balls
Silver medal – second place	2021 Konya	5 Hoops
European Cup
Bronze medal – third place	2024 Baku	All-around
Bronze medal – third place	2024 Baku	3 Ribbons + 2 Balls

Zeynab Hummatova (Azerbaijani: Zeynəb Hümmətova; born 6 December 1999) is an Azerbaijani group rhythmic gymnast. She is the 2022 World 3 ribbons + 2 balls bronze medalist. She is the 2020 European group all-around silver medalist and 2022 European group all-around bronze medalist.

== Personal life ==
Zeynab retired in 2024. She got married in December that year.

== Career ==
Hummatova began gymnastics when she was six years old.

=== Senior ===
Hummatova competed at the 2018 European Championships and won a bronze medal with the Azerbaijani group in the 3 Balls + 2 Ropes final. They also placed seventh in the group all-around and sixth in the team competition with the junior gymnasts. At the 2018 Kazan World Challenge Cup, she won a gold medal in the 3 Balls + 2 Ropes movie with the Azerbaijani group. She then competed at the 2018 World Championships in Sofia, Bulgaria, where she placed seventh in the group all-around competition, fifth in the 5 Hoops final, and seventh in the 3 Balls + 2 Ropes final.

Hummatova represented Azerbaijan at the 2019 European Games where the Azerbaijani group finished sixth in the group all-around and the 3 Hoops + 4 Clubs final and seventh in the 5 Balls final. She was also a part of the group that took eighth place in the all-around and seventh in the 3 Hoops + 4 Clubs final at the 2019 World Championships in Baku. After the World Championships, she had surgery but returned to training six weeks later.

Hummatova competed at the 2020 European Championships in Kyiv. Together with Laman Alimuradova, Darya Sorokina, Yelyzaveta Luzan and Maryam Safarova, she won a silver medal in group all-around and a bronze medal in 3 Hoops + 4 Clubs final. They also won the bronze medal in the team competition together with the juniors. At the 2021 European Championships, the group finished sixth in the 5 Balls event final and fourth in the 3 Hoops + 4 Clubs event final in addition to placing seventh in the group all-around and in the team competition.

Hummatova was selected to represent Azerbaijan at the 2020 Summer Olympics alongside Laman Alimuradova, Darya Sorokina, Yelyzaveta Luzan, and Narmina Samadova. They finished tenth in the qualification round for the group all-around and were the second reserve for the final. She was then selected to compete at the 2021 World Championships. The Azerbaijani group finished sixth in the group all-around and qualified for both event finals. The group finished sixth in both the 5 balls and the 3 hoops + 4 clubs finals.

Hummatova and the Azerbaijani group won the 5 hoops gold medal and the all-around silver medal at the 2022 Baku World Cup. At the 2022 Pamplona World Challenge Cup, she won three bronze medals in the group all-around, 5 hoops, and 3 ribbons + 2 balls. Then at the European Championships in Tel Aviv, the Azerbaijani group won the bronze medals in the group all-around, 5 hoops, and 3 ribbons + 2 balls. She then represented Azerbaijan at the 2021 Islamic Solidarity Games where the Azerbaijani group won the gold medal in the all-around. Then in the event finals, they won gold in 3 ribbons + 2 balls and silver in 5 hoops behind Uzbekistan.

Hummatova competed at the 2022 World Championships alongside Gullu Aghalarzade, Laman Alimuradova, Yelyzaveta Luzan, and Darya Sorokina. In the 3 ribbons + 2 balls final, the group won the bronze medal behind Bulgaria and Italy. This marked the first time an Azerbaijani group won a medal at the Rhythmic Gymnastics World Championships.
