= Gymnastics at the 2022 Summer Gymnasiade =

- Location: Normandy, France
- Date: May 14–22, 2022

The gymnastics competitions at the 2022 Summer Gymnasiade were held from May 14 to 22, 2022 in Normandy, France.

== Medal winners ==
=== Artistic gymnastics ===
Event	Gold	Silver	Bronze
Men
Team	France; Romain Cavallaro; Justin Labro; Lorenzo Sainte Rose; Hugo Carmona; Axel Breche	Turkey; Mert Efe Kılıçer; Ahmet Burak Ekici; Altan Doğan; Liu Carlo Mandela Tuakli; Volkan Arda Hamarat	Finland; Joona Reinman; Marcus Pietarinen; Aaro Harju; Aleksi Vesala
All-around	Romain Cavallaro (FRA)	Emil Akhmejanov (KAZ)	Mert Efe Kılıçer (TUR)
Floor exercise	Lorenzo Sainte Rose (FRA)	Hugo Carmona (FRA)	Joona Reinman (FIN)
Pommel horse	Romain Cavallaro (FRA) Zeinolla Idrissov (KAZ)	—N/a	Quentin Brandenburger (LUX)
Still rings	Romain Cavallaro (FRA)	Dmytro Prudko (UKR)	Hugo Carmona (FRA)
Vault	Lorenzo Sainte Rose (FRA)	Joona Reinman (FIN)	Emil Akhmejanov (KAZ)
Parallel bars	Chuang Chia-lung (TPE)	Romain Cavallaro (FRA)	Joona Reinman (FIN)
Horizontal bar	Romain Cavallaro (FRA)	Chuang Chia-lung (TPE)	Szilárd Závory (HUN)
Women
Team	France; Lea Franceries; Lucie Henna; Lucia Dul; Maewenn Eugene; Louane Versaveau	Hungary; Gréta Mayer; Hanna Szujó; Lilla Makai; Mirtill Makovits; Kira Balázs	Turkey; Ceren Biner; Sevgi Seda Kayışoğlu; Bengisu Yıldız; Derin Tanrıyaşükür; Beyza Özen
All-around	Lea Franceries (FRA)	Lucie Henna (FRA)	Gréta Mayer (HUN)
Vault	Lea Franceries (FRA)	Ceren Biner (TUR)	Gréta Mayer (HUN)
Uneven bars	Mirtill Makovits (HUN)	Lilla Makai (HUN)	Lucie Henna (FRA)
Balance beam	Lucie Henna (FRA)	Maewenn Eugene (FRA)	Rafaela Oliva (BRA)
Floor exercise	Lea Franceries (FRA)	Lucie Henna (FRA)	Ceren Biner (TUR)

=== Rhythmic gymnastics ===
Event	Gold	Silver	Bronze
Individual all-around	Hélène Karbanov (FRA)	Panagiota Lytra (GRE)	Lily Ramonatxo (FRA)
Hoop	Panagiota Lytra (GRE)	Lily Ramonatxo (FRA)	Hélène Karbanov (FRA)
Ball	Hélène Karbanov (FRA)	Panagiota Lytra (GRE)	Sabina Bakatova (KAZ)
Clubs	Hélène Karbanov (FRA)	Paraskevi Giannopoulou (GRE)	Panagiota Lytra (GRE)
Ribbon	Lily Ramonatxo (FRA)	Panagiota Lytra (GRE)	Sabina Bakatova (KAZ)
Group all-around	Kazakhstan	Brazil	France

== Medal table ==
Rank	Nation	Gold	Silver	Bronze	Total
1	France (FRA)	16	6	5	27
2	Kazakhstan (KAZ)	2	1	3	6
3	Greece (GRE)	1	4	1	6
4	Hungary (HUN)	1	2	3	6
5	Chinese Taipei (TPE)	1	1	0	2
6	Turkey (TUR)	0	2	3	5
7	Finland (FIN)	0	1	3	4
8	Brazil (BRA)	0	1	1	2
9	Ukraine (UKR)	0	1	0	1
10	Luxembourg (LUX)	0	0	1	1
Totals (10 entries)		21	19	20	60

== See also ==
- Gymnastics at the 2013 Gymnasiade
- Gymnastics at the 2018 Gymnasiade
