= Gymnastics at the 2025 Summer World University Games =

International gymnastics championship event

Gymnastics at the Universiade
- Venues: Messe Essen
- Dates: July 22, 2025 – July 26, 2025 (artistic); July 17, 2025 – July 19, 2025 (rhythmic)

Artistic gymnastics was contested at the 2025 Summer World University Games from July 22 to 26, 2025 at the Messe Essen Halle 3 in Essen, North Rhine-Westphalia, Germany. Rhythmic gymnastics was contested from July 17 to 19 at the Messe Essen Halle 4.

== Medal table ==
=== Combined ===
* Host nation (Germany)

Rank	Nation	Gold	Silver	Bronze	Total
1	Japan	8	8	2	18
2	China	3	1	1	5
–	Individual Neutral Athletes	2	2	1	5
3	Uzbekistan	2	2	0	4
4	Azerbaijan	2	1	0	3
5	Ukraine	1	2	0	3
6	Canada	1	1	2	4
6	Germany*	1	1	2	4
8	Armenia	1	0	0	1
8	Great Britain	1	0	0	1
10	Chinese Taipei	0	1	2	3
10	Hungary	0	1	2	3
12	Switzerland	0	1	1	2
13	Spain	0	1	0	1
14	South Korea	0	0	4	4
15	Austria	0	0	1	1
15	Belgium	0	0	1	1
15	France	0	0	1	1
15	Kazakhstan	0	0	1	1
15	United States	0	0	1	1
Totals (19 entries)		22	22	22	66

=== Artistic gymnastics ===
* Host nation (Germany)

Rank	Nation	Gold	Silver	Bronze	Total
1	Japan	8	8	1	17
2	China	3	1	1	5
3	Canada	1	1	2	4
4	Armenia	1	0	0	1
4	Great Britain	1	0	0	1
6	Chinese Taipei	0	1	1	2
6	Switzerland	0	1	1	2
8	Hungary	0	1	0	1
8	Spain	0	1	0	1
10	South Korea	0	0	3	3
11	Austria	0	0	1	1
11	Belgium	0	0	1	1
11	France	0	0	1	1
11	Germany*	0	0	1	1
11	United States	0	0	1	1
Totals (15 entries)		14	14	14	42

=== Rythmic gymnastics ===
* Host nation (Germany)

Rank	Nation	Gold	Silver	Bronze	Total
–	Individual Neutral Athletes	2	2	1	5
1	Uzbekistan	2	2	0	4
2	Azerbaijan	2	1	0	3
3	Ukraine	1	2	0	3
4	Germany*	1	1	1	3
5	Hungary	0	0	2	2
6	Chinese Taipei	0	0	1	1
6	Japan	0	0	1	1
6	Kazakhstan	0	0	1	1
6	South Korea	0	0	1	1
Totals (9 entries)		8	8	8	24

== Artistic gymnastics ==
=== Men's events ===
Event	Gold	Silver	Bronze
Team all-around	Japan (JPN); Tsuyoshi Hasegawa; Daiki Hashimoto; Shohei Kawakami; Shinnosuke Oka; Tomoharu Tsunogai	Canada (CAN); Matteo Bardana; Ioannis Chronopoulos; Félix Dolci; William Émard; Jayson Rampersad	Switzerland (SUI); Luca Murabito; Mattia Piffaretti; Tim Randegger; Ian Raubal; Dominic Tamsel
Individual all-around	Daiki Hashimoto; Japan	Shohei Kawakami; Japan	William Émard; Canada
Floor	Luke Whitehouse; Great Britain	Shinnosuke Oka; Japan	Moon Geon-young; South Korea
Pommel horse	Hamlet Manukyan; Armenia	Daiki Hashimoto; Japan	Patrick Hoopes; United States
Rings	Liu Hengyu; China	Liu Yang; China	William Émard; Canada
Vault	Chen Zhilong; China	Luca Murabito; Switzerland	Kim Jae-ho; South Korea
Parallel bars	Tomoharu Tsunogai; Japan	Shinnosuke Oka; Japan	Moon Geon-young; South Korea
Horizontal bar	Félix Dolci; Canada	Daiki Hashimoto; Japan	He Xiang; China

=== Women's events ===
Event	Gold	Silver	Bronze
Team all-around	Japan (JPN); Urara Ashikawa; Kokoro Fukasawa; Shoko Miyata; Mana Okamura; Kohane Ushioku	Spain (ESP); Maia Llacer; Laia Masferrer; Lorena Medina; Irene Ros; Ainara Sautua	France (FRA); Maeva Guery; Alisson Lapp; Alizée Letrange; Célia Serber
Individual all-around	Shoko Miyata; Japan	Mana Okamura; Japan	Tonya Paulsson; Chinese Taipei
Vault	Shoko Miyata; Japan	Kohane Ushioku; Japan	Selina Kickinger; Austria
Uneven bars	Yang Fanyuwei; China	Zója Székely; Hungary	Shoko Miyata; Japan
Balance beam	Urara Ashikawa; Japan	Tonya Paulsson; Chinese Taipei	Emma Malewski; Germany
Floor	Shoko Miyata; Japan	Kohane Ushioku; Japan	Jade Vansteenkiste; Belgium

== Rhythmic gymnastics ==
=== Individual ===
Event	Gold	Silver	Bronze
All-around	Alina Harnasko; Individual Neutral Athletes	Takhmina Ikromova; Uzbekistan	Fanni Pigniczki; Hungary
Hoop	Takhmina Ikromova; Uzbekistan	Anastasia Simakova; Germany	Fanni Pigniczki; Hungary
Ball	Margarita Kolosov; Germany	Alina Harnasko; Individual Neutral Athletes	Anastasia Simakova; Germany
Clubs	Alina Harnasko; Individual Neutral Athletes	Takhmina Ikromova; Uzbekistan	Anastasiia Salos; Individual Neutral Athletes
Ribbon	Takhmina Ikromova; Uzbekistan	Alina Harnasko; Individual Neutral Athletes	Aibota Yertaikyzy; Kazakhstan

=== Group ===
Event	Gold	Silver	Bronze
All-around	Azerbaijan (AZE); Yelyzaveta Luzan; Darya Sorokina; Kamilla Aliyeva; Laman Alimuradova; Gullu Aghalarzade	Ukraine (UKR); Valeriia Panchenko; Kateryna Hrachova; Emiliia Lavrynets; Daniela Chebatarova; Marta Borys; Bohdana Melnyk	Japan (JPN); Airi Higashi; Miu Omachi; Noa Futatsugi; Hana Kumasaka; Nonoka Murakuni; Rika Nakamura
5 Ribbons	Azerbaijan (AZE); Yelyzaveta Luzan; Darya Sorokina; Kamilla Aliyeva; Laman Alimuradova; Gullu Aghalarzade	Ukraine (UKR); Valeriia Panchenko; Kateryna Hrachova; Emiliia Lavrynets; Daniela Chebatarova; Marta Borys; Bohdana Melnyk	South Korea (KOR); Park Do-gyeong; Kim Joo-won; Kim Min; Lee So-yoon; Lee So-yun; Ko Ye-jin
3 Balls + 2 Hoops	Ukraine (UKR); Valeriia Panchenko; Kateryna Hrachova; Emiliia Lavrynets; Daniela Chebatarova; Marta Borys; Bohdana Melnyk	Azerbaijan (AZE); Yelyzaveta Luzan; Darya Sorokina; Kamilla Aliyeva; Laman Alimuradova; Gullu Aghalarzade	Chinese Taipei (TPE); Huang Yun-jen; Chen Yung-chi; Ju Jie-chi; Pan Yu-kuan; Lu Pei-chi; Chuang Yi-an

== Men's artistic results ==
=== All-around ===
Rank	Athlete	Floor (gymnastics)	Pommel horse	Rings (gymnastics)	Vault (gymnastics)	Parallel bars	Horizontal bar	Total
1st place, gold medalist(s)	Daiki Hashimoto (JPN)	14.366	14.066	14.000	14.400	14.300	13.133	84.265
2nd place, silver medalist(s)	Shohei Kawakami (JPN)	13.366	12.733	13.266	14.400	14.733	14.900	83.398
3rd place, bronze medalist(s)	William Émard (CAN)	13.600	12.566	14.200	14.133	13.900	13.333	81.732
4	Jesse Moore (AUS)	14.033	12.900	12.600	13.833	13.966	12.966	80.298
5	Diogo Soares (BRA)	12.366	13.466	12.866	13.833	13.833	13.566	79.930
6	Colt Walker (USA)	12.433	13.133	13.033	14.000	13.900	12.900	79.399
7	He Xiang (CHN)	12.333	13.466	13.033	12.833	13.400	13.666	78.731
8	Tim Randegger (SUI)	12.500	13.333	12.733	13.500	13.133	13.400	78.599
9	Ignacio Yockers (ESP)	12.466	14.233	12.200	13.333	13.566	12.533	78.331
10	Chuang Chia-lung (TPE)	13.233	13.633	12.066	13.500	12.500	13.333	78.265
11	Ioannis Chronopoulos (CAN)	12.566	13.400	12.100	13.333	13.000	13.500	77.899
12	Alexander Kunz (GER)	13.166	11.333	13.033	13.100	12.900	13.466	76.998
13	Pau Jiménez (ESP)	13.766	11.466	13.733	14.000	11.766	11.933	76.664
14	Sam Mostowfi (GBR)	12.666	12.533	12.533	14.000	13.266	11.533	76.531
15	Senne Spyckerelle (BEL)	13.033	12.033	12.366	13.333	13.166	12.400	76.331
16	Kim Jae-ho (KOR)	12.333	12.300	11.766	14.100	12.866	12.066	75.431
17	Mattia Piffaretti (SUI)	13.900	9.933	12.233	13.766	12.533	12.866	75.231
18	Kai Uemura (USA)	11.400	12.700	12.600	13.333	12.833	11.500	74.066

=== Floor exercise ===
Rank	Athlete	Score				Total
Rank	Athlete	D Score	E Score	Pen.	Bon.	Total
1st place, gold medalist(s)	Luke Whitehouse (GBR)	6.100	8.466			14.566
2nd place, silver medalist(s)	Shinnosuke Oka (JPN)	5.400	8.866		0.1	14.366
3rd place, bronze medalist(s)	Moon Geon-young (KOR)	5.600	8.333	-0.100	0.1	13.933
4	Dmitriy Patanin (KAZ)	5.100	8.900	-0.100		13.900
5	Altynkhan Temirbek (KAZ)	5.100	8.766	-0.200	0.1	13.766
6	Sam Mostowfi (GBR)	5.400	8.433	-0.200	0.1	13.733
7	Tate Costa (USA)	5.100	8.400		0.1	13.600
8	Marcelo Marques (POR)	5.100	7.400	-0.700		11.800

=== Pommel horse ===
Rank	Athlete	Score			Total
Rank	Athlete	D Score	E Score	Pen.	Total
1st place, gold medalist(s)	Hamlet Manukyan (ARM)	5.600	9.333		14.933
2nd place, silver medalist(s)	Daiki Hashimoto (JPN)	5.700	8.833		14.533
3rd place, bronze medalist(s)	Patrick Hoopes (USA)	6.000	8.466		14.466
4	Ignacio Yockers (ESP)	5.700	8.500		14.200
5	Ravshan Kamiljanov (UZB)	5.600	8.466		14.066
6	Abdelrahman Abdelhaleem (EGY)	5.500	7.400		12.900
7	Ihor Dyshuk (UKR)	5.800	6.700		12.500
8	Mamikon Khachatryan (ARM)	5.200	6.733		11.933

=== Rings ===
Rank	Athlete	Score				Total
Rank	Athlete	D Score	E Score	Pen.	Bon.	Total
1st place, gold medalist(s)	Liu Hengyu (CHN)	5.600	8.966		0.1	14.666
2nd place, silver medalist(s)	Liu Yang (CHN)	5.400	8.800		0.1	14.300
3rd place, bronze medalist(s)	William Émard (CAN)	5.300	8.933			14.233
4	Seo Jung-won (KOR)	5.800	8.366			14.166
5	Liam De Smet (BEL)	5.300	8.533			13.833
6	Shinnosuke Oka (JPN)	5.000	8.033			13.033
7	Lin Guan-Yi (TPE)	5.500	7.533			13.033
8	Pau Jiménez (ESP)	5.200	7.666			12.866

=== Vault ===
Rank	Athlete	Vault	Score					Total
Rank	Athlete	Vault	D Score	E Score	Pen.	Bon.	Score	Total
1st place, gold medalist(s)	Chen Zhilong (CHN)	1	5.600	9.033			14.633	14.549
1st place, gold medalist(s)	Chen Zhilong (CHN)	2	5.200	9.266			14.466	14.549
2nd place, silver medalist(s)	Luca Murabito (SUI)	1	5.200	8.933			14.133	14.033
2nd place, silver medalist(s)	Luca Murabito (SUI)	2	4.800	9.233	-0.100		13.933	14.033
3rd place, bronze medalist(s)	Kim Jae-ho (KOR)	1	5.200	8.900			14.100	13.983
3rd place, bronze medalist(s)	Kim Jae-ho (KOR)	2	4.800	9.166	-0.100		13.866	13.983
4	Nazar Chepurnyi (UKR)	1	5.200	9.333			14.533	13.833
4	Nazar Chepurnyi (UKR)	2	5.200	8.233	-0.300		13.133	13.833
5	Shohei Kawakami (JPN)	1	5.200	8.100			13.300	13.633
5	Shohei Kawakami (JPN)	2	4.800	9.266	-0.100		13.966	13.633
6	Yeh Cheng (TPE)	1	4.800	9.333			14.133	13.433
6	Yeh Cheng (TPE)	2	4.800	7.933			12.733	13.433
7	Unai Baigorri (ESP)	1	4.800	9.233			14.033	13.433
7	Unai Baigorri (ESP)	2	4.400	8.733	-0.300		12.833	13.433
8	James Hardy (AUS)	1	4.800	8.033	-0.300		12.533	13.049
8	James Hardy (AUS)	2	4.800	8.866	-0.100		13.566	13.049

=== Parallel bars ===
Rank	Athlete	Score				Total
Rank	Athlete	D Score	E Score	Pen.	Bon.	Total
1st place, gold medalist(s)	Tomoharu Tsunogai (JPN)	5.700	9.000			14.700
2nd place, silver medalist(s)	Shinnosuke Oka (JPN)	5.600	8.833		0.1	14.533
3rd place, bronze medalist(s)	Moon Geon-young (KOR)	5.600	8.833			14.433
4	Ian Raubal (SUI)	5.400	8.400		0.1	13.900
5	William Émard (CAN)	5.000	8.600			13.600
6	Jesse Moore (AUS)	5.100	7.600			12.700
7	Altan Dogan (TUR)	4.600	7.633			12.233
8	Mohamed Afify (EGY)	3.800	5.100			8.900

=== Horizontal bar ===
Rank	Athlete	Score				Total
Rank	Athlete	D Score	E Score	Pen.	Bon.	Total
1st place, gold medalist(s)	Félix Dolci (CAN)	5.800	8.733		0.1	14.633
2nd place, silver medalist(s)	Daiki Hashimoto (JPN)	5.600	8.400		0.1	14.100
3rd place, bronze medalist(s)	He Xiang (CHN)	5.200	8.866			14.066
4	Kyano Schepers (BEL)	4.600	9.066			13.666
5	Tim Randegger (SUI)	5.400	8.166			13.566
6	Shinnosuke Oka (JPN)	5.700	7.466			13.166
7	Heath Thorpe (AUS)	5.500	7.500			13.000
8	Dominic Tamsel (SUI)	4.300	7.866		0.1	12.266

== Women's artistic results ==
=== Team ===
Team	Vault (gymnastics)		Uneven bars		Balance beam		Floor (gymnastics)		Total (All-around)	
Team	Score	Rank	Score	Rank	Score	Rank	Score	Rank	Score	Rank
Japan	41.150	1	40.600	1	42.300	1	39.800	1	163.850	1st place, gold medalist(s)
Kohane Ushioku (JPN)	13.750	2	13.150	14			13.250	3		
Shoko Miyata (JPN)	13.950	1	13.700	5	13.850	3	13.650	1	55.150	1
Mana Okamura (JPN)	13.100		12.900	19	14.400	1	12.250	29	52.650	2
Kokoro Fukasawa (JPN)	13.450		13.750	4	11.800	41				
Urara Ashikawa (JPN)					14.050	2	12.900	6		
Spain	39.250	2	39.600	3	35.200	12	37.700	3	151.750	2nd place, silver medalist(s)
Laia Masferrer (ESP)	13.050	16	13.450	10	11.700	44	11.150	62	49.350	28
Ainara Sautua (ESP)			13.550	8						
Maia Llacer (ESP)	13.100	21	10.350	71	10.900	64	12.650	11	47.000	43
Irene Ros (ESP)	13.100	22			10.600	67	12.500	20		
Lorena Medina (ESP)	13.000	14	12.600	29	12.600	20	12.550	16	50.750	10
France	38.300	8	38.900	4	36.450	6	37.000	7	150.650	3rd place, bronze medalist(s)
Célia Serber (FRA)	12.950		13.600	7	11.950	36	11.850	45	50.350	15
Alisson Lapp (FRA)	12.300		12.700	25	11.600	48	12.250	27	48.850	29
Maeva Guery (FRA)	11.750				12.200	29	10.050	78		
Alizée Letrange (FRA)	13.050		12.600	28	12.300	26	12.900	5	50.850	9
South Korea	38.950	4	38.600	5	35.750	10	37.200	5	150.500	4
Kim Seo-hyeon (KOR)	12.850	18								
Shin Sol-yi (KOR)	13.200	10	13.100	16	12.300	25	12.800	8	51.400	4
An Yeon-jeong (KOR)	12.450		12.650	26	12.950	9	12.000	39	50.050	19
Lee Yun-seo (KOR)			12.000	39	10.500	72	12.400	24		
Eom Do-hyun (KOR)	12.900		12.850	21	10.500	73	11.950	41	48.200	32
Switzerland	37.650	13	37.950	6	37.350	3	37.100	6	150.050	5
Anina Wildi (SUI)	12.850	25	12.150	36	12.850	14	12.550	16	50.400	13
Anny Wu (SUI)	12.850		13.050	17	11.350	57	12.650	10	49.900	20
Martina Eisenegger (SUI)	11.950		12.750	23	13.150	7	11.900	42	49.750	22
Chinese Taipei	38.650	5	37.350	8	37.250	4	36.750	8	150.000	6
Ting Hua-tien (TPE)			12.400	31	12.150	31	11.650	48		
Lin Yi-chen (TPE)	11.750	29	11.550	51	11.350	58	10.450	74	45.100	53
Wu Sing-fen (TPE)	13.000	11								
Tonya Paulsson (TPE)	12.900		13.400	12	13.250	6	12.800	7	52.350	3
Liao Yi-chun (TPE)	12.750	24	11.000	61	11.850	40	12.300	26	47.900	35
Turkey	39.100	3	37.650	7	35.200	13	37.450	4	149.400	7
Bilge Tarhan (TUR)	13.000	6	11.900	45	12.050	33	12.600	12	49.550	25
Nazlı Savranbaşı (TUR)	12.600		13.100	15	11.550	50	12.600	12	49.850	21
Bengisu Yildiz (TUR)	13.050	8	12.650	26	11.600	49	12.250	28	49.550	23
Atiye Berra Karademir (TUR)	13.050	5								
Ceren Biner (TUR)			10.550	67	11.000	61	12.150	31		
Canada	37.950	11	35.100	14	37.200	5	37.750	2	148.000	8
Kahlyn Lawson (CAN)										
Virginie Therrien (CAN)	13.200	9	10.500	68	11.900	38	12.050	36	47.650	36
Evandra Zlobec (CAN)	12.350		12.350	33	12.400	23	13.150	4	50.250	16
Maddison Hajjar (CAN)	12.400		12.250	34	12.900	11	12.550	15	50.100	18
Italy	38.400	6	36.900	9	35.850	9	35.250	13	146.400	9
Marta Uggeri (ITA)	13.000		11.950	42	12.650	17	11.850	46	49.450	26
Carolina James (ITA)	12.350		12.000	41	11.550	50	10.700	72	46.600	45
Veronica Mandriota (ITA)	13.050		12.950	18	11.650	47	12.700	9	50.350	14
Great Britain	38.250	9	36.750	11	35.900	8	35.100	14	146.000	10
Shanna-kae Grant (GBR)	12.700		11.850	46	12.600	19	10.850	67	48.000	34
Emily Burke (GBR)	12.550	20	12.050	38	10.500	70	11.650	47	46.750	44
Crystelle Lake (GBR)	13.000		12.850	20	12.800	15	12.600	14	51.250	7
Czech Republic	38.400	7	35.400	13	34.800	14	35.500	11	144.100	11
Dominika Ponizilova (CZE)	13.150	7	12.050	37	10.950	63	12.000	37	48.150	33
Sabina Halova (CZE)			11.350	59	12.450	22	10.250	75		
Daniela Halova (CZE)	12.200		10.700	63	11.000	60	11.450	51	45.350	51
Aneta Holasová (CZE)	13.050	15	12.000	40	11.350	56	12.050	35	48.450	31
Finland	37.900	12	33.450	18	36.050	7	35.650	10	143.050	12
Misella Antila (FIN)			10.600	73	12.600	20				
Saara Kokko (FIN)	12.600	19	10.050	74	10.500	71	11.050	65	44.200	57
Sara Laiho (FIN)	12.250						12.050	33		
Minea Antila (FIN)	12.050		10.150	66	11.200	59	10.200	77	43.600	61
Ada Hautala (FIN)	13.050		12.700	24	12.250	28	12.550	16	50.550	12
Australia	33.950	18	36.900	10	35.400	11	36.050	9	142.300	13
Emma Morris (AUS)	11.750		10.650	64	11.750	42	12.350	25	46.500	46
Kate McDonald (AUS)	10.600		14.350	1	12.700	16	12.550	19	50.200	17
Adelaide Hooper (AUS)	11.600		11.900	43	10.950	62	11.150	60	45.600	49
Austria	38.000	10	34.550	15	34.200	15	35.000	15	141.750	14
Alissa Moerz (AUT)	12.350		10.500	70	10.700	66	11.350	52	44.900	54
Katrin Palicka (AUT)	12.450		11.300	60	10.550	68	11.200	58	45.500	50
Selina Kickinger (AUT)	13.200	3	12.750	22	12.950	10	12.450	21	51.350	6
Germany	36.800	16	31.750	20	38.500	2	34.250	16	141.300	15
Emma Malewski (GER)					13.400	4				
Elena Engelhardt (GER)	11.850		10.500	68	12.200	30	10.750	70	45.300	52
Aiyu Zhu (GER)	12.700		9.900	76	12.900	12	11.600	49	47.100	42
Alina Heinemann (GER)	12.250		11.350	58	12.100	32	11.900	43	47.600	39
Nele Rueping (GER)										
Norway	36.600	17	34.400	16	33.400	16	34.000	17	138.400	16
Juliane Toessebro (NOR)	12.400		11.350	57	11.900	37	11.600	49	47.250	41
Olivia Bergem (NOR)	12.150		11.450	53	10.100	76	11.050	64	44.750	55
Julie Erichsen (NOR)					11.400	55				
Mali Neurauter (NOR)	12.050						11.350	53		
Selma Halvorsen (NOR)	11.950		11.600	50	9.800	78	10.750	71	44.100	59
Portugal	37.650	14	33.700	17	31.150	19	35.450	12	137.950	17
Mariana Parente (POR)	12.500		11.400	55	9.100	83	11.200	57	44.200	56
Mafalda Costa (POR)	12.450		11.400	56	11.650	46	12.050	34	47.550	40
Mariana Marianito (POR)	12.700	17	10.900	62	10.400	75	12.200	30	46.200	47
Netherlands	37.600	15	32.050	19	31.400	18	32.550	19	133.600	18
Sam van der Hilst (NED)	12.750	23	9.850	77	9.600	79	10.800	69	43.000	63
Mijke Jansen (NED)	11.950		10.300	72	9.150	82	9.750	79	41.150	66
Mischa Marchena (NED)	12.900		11.900	44	12.650	18	12.000	38	49.450	27
Brazil	24.550	19	35.850	12	32.350	17	22.450	20	115.200	19
Ana Luiza Lima (BRA)			13.500	9	12.000	34				
Julia Bastidas da Silva (BRA)	12.500		12.450	30	11.550	50	11.150	61	47.650	37
Rafaela Oliva (BRA)	12.050		9.900	75	8.800	85	11.300	55	42.050	64
Egypt	23.200	20	11.800	21	20.750	21	33.600	18	88.350	20
Malak Chawkat (EGY)	11.500	27					10.250	76		
Jana Mahmoud (EGY)					9.850	77	12.000	40		
Jana Abdelsalam (EGY)	11.700		11.800	47	10.900	65	11.350	54	45.750	48
Hungary	13.050	21	39.850	2	23.100	20	12.450	21	87.450	21
Zsófia Kovács (HUN)			13.450	11						
Bianka Schermann (HUN)	13.050	12	12.400	32	11.650	45	12.450	22	49.550	24
Zója Székely (HUN)			14.000	3	11.450	54				
Individual
Mane Poghosyan (ARM)			9.450	80						
Ylea Tollet (BEL)					12.000	35	11.150	63		
Jade Vansteenkiste (BEL)	13.300		11.650	49	12.900	13	13.500	2	51.350	5
Tamara Ampuero (CHI)	11.800		9.550	79	10.550	69	9.400	80	41.300	65
Sofia Casella (CHI)	11.650		10.650	65	10.450	74	10.850	68	43.600	62
Erin Bakran (CRO)					11.450	53				
Christina Zwicker (CRO)					11.850	39				
Xiang Lulu (CHN)	12.750		13.700	6	13.350	5	11.200	59	51.000	8
Yang Fanyuwei (CHN)			14.200	2						
Heika del sol Castro (CRC)	12.400		11.700	48	9.550	80	10.500	73	44.150	58
Victoria Gilberg (DEN)			8.150	81	9.500	81				
Maria Tabango (ECU)					6.350	87	9.150	81		
Chan Cheuk Lam (HKG)					12.250	27	11.900	44		
Céleste Mordenti (LUX)	13.150	4	13.400	13	11.700	43	12.450	23	50.700	11
Alisa Wada (NZL)	12.550		9.800	78	13.100	8	12.150	31	47.600	38
Meta Kunaver (SLO)										
Sergeja Mlakar (SLO)	12.300	26			8.000	86				
Sara Surmanova (SVK)	12.700	13	12.150	35	12.350	24	11.250	56	48.450	30
Anastasiia Zadvorna (UKR)			11.450	54						
Viktoriia Ivanenko (UKR)	12.500	28	11.500	52	9.050	84	10.950	66	44.000	60

=== All-around ===
Rank	Athlete	Vault (gymnastics)	Uneven bars	Balance beam	Floor (gymnastics)	Total
1st place, gold medalist(s)	Shoko Miyata (JPN)	13.533	13.633	13.500	13.600	54.266
2nd place, silver medalist(s)	Mana Okamura (JPN)	12.900	12.900	13.700	13.366	52.866
3rd place, bronze medalist(s)	Tonya Paulsson (TPE)	12.800	13.466	12.966	12.833	52.065
4	Célia Serber (FRA)	13.300	13.633	13.066	12.033	52.032
5	Jade Vansteenkiste (BEL)	13.833	11.533	12.800	13.600	51.766
6	Selina Kickinger (AUT)	13.266	12.966	12.333	12.333	50.898
7	Shin Sol-yi (KOR)	13.333	12.700	12.900	11.766	50.699
8	Evandra Zlobec (CAN)	12.766	12.233	12.300	13.100	50.399
9	Crystelle Lake (GBR)	13.133	12.200	12.266	12.666	50.265
10	Ada Hautala (FIN)	13.000	12.700	11.700	12.433	49.833
11	Céleste Mordenti (LUX)	12.133	13.200	11.700	12.433	49.466
12	Xiang Lulu (CHN)	13.233	12.933	12.400	10.633	49.199
13	Lorena Medina (ESP)	12.866	12.266	10.366	12.466	47.964
14	Kate McDonald (AUS)	10.533	12.466	11.366	13.133	47.498
15	Veronica Mandriota (ITA)	12.233	12.833	10.966	11.433	47.465
16	Maddison Hajjar (CAN)	11.500	11.066	12.766	12.033	47.365
17	Anina Wildi (SUI)	12.600	11.800	12.033	10.566	46.999
DNF	Alizee Letrange (FRA)	13.133	11.166			–

=== Vault ===
Rank	Athlete	Vault	Score				Bonus	Total
Rank	Athlete	Vault	D Score	E Score	Pen.	Score	Bonus	Total
1st place, gold medalist(s)	Shoko Miyata (JPN)	1	5.000	8.766		13.766	0.2	13.699
1st place, gold medalist(s)	Shoko Miyata (JPN)	2	4.800	8.733	-0.300	13.233	0.2	13.699
2nd place, silver medalist(s)	Kohane Ushioku (JPN)	1	5.000	8.733	-0.100	13.633	0.0	13.549
2nd place, silver medalist(s)	Kohane Ushioku (JPN)	2	4.800	8.766	-0.100	13.466	0.0	13.549
3rd place, bronze medalist(s)	Selina Kickinger (AUT)	1	4.200	9.133		13.333	0.2	13.366
3rd place, bronze medalist(s)	Selina Kickinger (AUT)	2	4.000	9.000		13.000	0.2	13.366
4	Céleste Mordenti (LUX)	1	4.200	8.933		13.133	0.2	13.183
4	Céleste Mordenti (LUX)	2	3.800	9.033		12.833	0.2	13.183
5	Dominika Ponížilová (CZE)	1	4.400	8.800		13.200	0.2	13.116
5	Dominika Ponížilová (CZE)	2	3.800	8.833		12.633	0.2	13.116
6	Atye Berra Karademir (TUR)	1	4.200	8.933		13.133	0.2	13.099
6	Atye Berra Karademir (TUR)	2	3.800	8.866		12.666	0.2	13.099
7	Bilge Tarhan (TUR)	1	4.200	8.800		13.000	0.2	12.983
7	Bilge Tarhan (TUR)	2	4.000	8.566		12.566	0.2	12.983
8	Virginie Therrien (CAN)	1	4.600	7.833	-0.300	12.133	0.0	12.333
8	Virginie Therrien (CAN)	2	3.800	8.733		12.533	0.0	12.333

=== Uneven bars ===
Rank	Athlete	Score			Total
Rank	Athlete	D Score	E Score	Pen.	Total
1st place, gold medalist(s)	Yang Fanyuwei (CHN)	6.700	8.300		15.000
2nd place, silver medalist(s)	Zója Székely (HUN)	6.000	7.800		13.800
3rd place, bronze medalist(s)	Shoko Miyata (JPN)	5.500	8.166		13.666
4	Célia Serber (FRA)	5.200	7.766		12.966
5	Kate McDonald (AUS)	5.600	7.166		12.766
6	Kokoro Fukasawa (JPN)	5.800	6.900		12.700
7	Xiang Lulu (CHN)	5.500	6.666		12.166
8	Ainara Sautua (ESP)	5.600	6.466		12.066

=== Balance beam ===
Rank	Athlete	Score			Total
Rank	Athlete	D Score	E Score	Pen.	Total
1st place, gold medalist(s)	Urara Ashikawa (JPN)	6.000	8.166		14.166
2nd place, silver medalist(s)	Tonya Paulsson (TPE)	5.000	8.266		13.266
3rd place, bronze medalist(s)	Emma Malewski (GER)	5.400	7.766		13.166
4	Mana Okamura (JPN)	6.000	6.033		12.033
5	An Yeon-jeong (KOR)	4.700	7.200		11.900
6	Alisa Wada (NZL)	4.700	7.166		11.866
7	Martina Eisenegger (SUI)	4.600	7.100		11.700
8	Xiang Lulu (CHN)	5.300	5.266	-0.100	10.466

=== Floor exercise ===
Rank	Athlete	Score			Total
Rank	Athlete	D Score	E Score	Pen.	Total
1st place, gold medalist(s)	Shoko Miyata (JPN)	5.700	8.000		13.700
2nd place, silver medalist(s)	Kohane Ushioku (JPN)	5.400	7.966		13.366
3rd place, bronze medalist(s)	Jade Vansteenkiste (BEL)	5.300	8.066	-0.100	13.266
4	Tonya Paulsson (TPE)	4.900	8.100		13.000
5	Evandra Zlobec (CAN)	5.100	7.800		12.900
6	Veronica Mandriota (ITA)	5.200	7.366		12.566
7	Shin Sol-yi (KOR)	5.200	7.233		12.433
8	Anny Wu (SUI)	4.200	7.333		11.533

== Rhythmic gymnastics results ==
=== Individual all-around ===
Rank	Athlete	Hoop (rhythmic gymnastics)	Ball (rhythmic gymnastics)	Clubs (rhythmic gymnastics)	Ribbon (rhythmic gymnastics)	Total
1st place, gold medalist(s)	Alina Harnasko (AIN)	28.500	28.900	29.050	28.400	114.850
2nd place, silver medalist(s)	Takhmina Ikromova (UZB)	27.800	28.300	29.600	27.000	112.700
3rd place, bronze medalist(s)	Fanni Pigniczki (HUN)	27.750	26.900	27.900	26.300	108.850
4	Anastasia Simakova (GER)	28.650	27.800	24.000	26.750	107.200
5	Aibota Yertaikyzy (KAZ)	27.350	26.550	27.350	25.650	106.900
6	Anastasiia Salos (AIN)	26.600	25.700	27.800	25.650	105.750
7	Sofia Maffeis (ITA)	26.250	26.250	25.600	25.600	103.700
8	Mirano Kita (JPN)	25.800	25.650	26.550	25.350	103.350
9	Polina Horodnycha (UKR)	25.500	25.200	26.050	26.150	102.900
10	Evita Griskenas (USA)	23.950	25.800	26.050	26.600	102.400
11	Andreea Verdes (ROU)	26.650	24.600	25.850	25.050	102.150
12	Lauren Grueniger (SUI)	26.450	26.200	25.800	23.150	101.600
13	Mei Tsuruta (JPN)	26.100	26.400	24.700	24.300	101.500
14	Khrystyna Pohranychna (UKR)	25.350	24.950	26.450	24.650	101.400
15	Margarita Kolosov (GER)	23.400	26.700	24.200	25.450	99.750
16	Hanna Panna Wiesner (HUN)	26.600	23.350	25.500	24.150	99.600
17	Maëna Millon (FRA)	26.800	25.350	23.150	24.150	99.450
18	Lia Kallio (FIN)	25.950	25.750	25.400	22.200	99.300
19	Emmi Piiroinen (FIN)	22.750	25.250	25.400	25.100	98.500
20	Josephine Juul Møller (NOR)	23.450	25.400	24.700	24.600	98.150
21	Ha Sulee (KOR)	25.350	22.850	25.200	24.300	97.700
22	Ilona Zeynalova (AZE)	24.800	24.650	23.900	23.450	96.800
23	Giulia Dellafelice (ITA)	25.150	23.700	23.100	24.550	96.500
24	Tereza Stankova (CZE)	24.200	23.350	24.750	23.900	96.200
25	Joana Pinheiro (POR)	24.900	22.600	25.150	23.500	96.150
26	Suzanna Shahbazian (CAN)	25.400	23.050	24.700	22.850	96.000
27	Kamilla Seyidzade (AZE)	24.500	23.700	23.800	23.750	95.750
28	Cho Byeolah (KOR)	25.150	24.400	21.450	24.500	95.500
29	Pin Rong Lee (CAN)	24.100	22.650	24.100	24.200	95.050
30	Emily Beznos (MDA)	23.400	23.500	23.950	23.850	94.700
31	Sarah Mariotti (USA)	22.400	24.500	24.950	22.300	94.150
32	Fausta Sostakaite (LTU)	22.950	24.750	22.450	23.150	93.300
33	Havana Hopman (NZL)	25.550	22.750	19.150	25.150	92.600
34	Tamara Artic (CRO)	24.000	22.600	24.800	20.500	91.900
35	Isabella Wang (AUS)	22.700	23.200	22.550	21.450	89.900
36	Barbara Galek-Olsthoorn (NED)	22.750	21.400	22.350	22.900	89.400
37	Claire Ng (SGP)	21.300	20.900	23.150	22.700	88.050
38	Kristin Frey (EST)	20.900	22.200	21.600	23.100	87.800
39	Piyada Peeramatukorn (THA)	21.900	21.700	22.900	20.350	86.850
40	Clara Paiva (POR)	21.500	20.550	21.450	22.800	86.300
41	Polina Hardikova (EST)	22.950	22.250	20.700	19.950	85.850
42	Maya Nickonchuk (AUT)	21.400	21.750	22.100	20.450	85.700
43	Valentina Domenig-Ozimic (AUT)	21.700	20.900	22.250	20.350	85.200
44	Tahlya Smith (AUS)	23.500	20.750	20.400	20.650	85.000
45	Noa Gabrielle van der Laan (NED)	21.450	19.500	22.700	20.550	84.200
46	Montserrat Urrutia (CHI)	21.600	20.350	20.350	21.850	84.150
47	Silva Sargsyan (ARM)	19.800	21.600	21.850	20.450	83.700
48	Julieta Avetisyan (ARM)	19.950	20.550	20.350	17.500	78.350
49	Antonia Herrera (CHI)	19.450	20.200	19.500	15.250	74.400

=== Hoop ===
Rank	Athlete	D score	A score	E score	Penalty	Total
1st place, gold medalist(s)	Takhmina Ikromova (UZB)	13.500	8.300	8.050		29.850
2nd place, silver medalist(s)	Anastasia Simakova (GER)	13.100	7.950	8.100		29.150
3rd place, bronze medalist(s)	Fanni Pigniczki (HUN)	11.900	7.700	7.600		27.200
4	Andreea Verdes (ROU)	11.800	7.800	7.600	-0.05	27.150
5	Alina Harnasko (AIN)	12.400	7.650	7.250	-0.30	27.000
6	Maëna Millon (FRA)	11.600	7.900	7.450		26.950
7	Aibota Yertaikyzy (KAZ)	11.700	7.550	7.600		26.850
8	Hanna Panna Wiesner (HUN)	10.800	7.400	6.800		25.000

=== Ball ===
Rank	Athlete	D score	A score	E score	Penalty	Total
1st place, gold medalist(s)	Margarita Kolosov (GER)	12.300	8.050	7.850		28.200
2nd place, silver medalist(s)	Alina Harnasko (AIN)	11.800	8.250	8.100		28.150
3rd place, bronze medalist(s)	Anastasia Simakova (GER)	11.500	8.100	7.900		27.500
4	Takhmina Ikromova (UZB)	11.600	8.100	7.700		27.400
5	Fanni Pigniczki (HUN)	11.800	8.000	7.600		27.400
6	Aibota Yertaikyzy (KAZ)	11.600	7.600	7.500		26.700
7	Sofia Maffeis (ITA)	10.300	7.850	7.000	-0.30	24.850
8	Mei Tsuruta (JPN)	10.300	7.250	6.550	-0.30	23.800

=== Clubs ===
Rank	Athlete	D score	A score	E score	Penalty	Total
1st place, gold medalist(s)	Alina Harnasko (AIN)	13.000	8.300	8.250		29.550
2nd place, silver medalist(s)	Takhmina Ikromova (UZB)	12.600	8.150	7.150		27.900
3rd place, bronze medalist(s)	Anastasiia Salos (AIN)	12.000	7.900	7.950		27.850
4	Aibota Yertaikyzy (KAZ)	11.600	7.500	7.700		26.800
5	Mirano Kita (JPN)	10.800	7.650	7.500		25.950
6	Fanni Pigniczki (HUN)	11.000	7.600	7.100		25.700
7	Evita Griskenas (USA)	11.200	7.450	6.700		25.350
8	Khrystyna Pohranychna (UKR)	10.600	7.450	7.000	-0.05	25.000

=== Ribbon ===
Rank	Athlete	D score	A score	E score	Penalty	Total
1st place, gold medalist(s)	Takhmina Ikromova (UZB)	12.500	8.200	8.050	-0.05	28.700
2nd place, silver medalist(s)	Alina Harnasko (AIN)	11.800	8.250	7.800		27.850
3rd place, bronze medalist(s)	Aibota Yertaikyzy (KAZ)	11.300	7.900	7.400		26.600
4	Anastasia Simakova (GER)	11.800	7.500	7.200		26.500
5	Anastasiia Salos (AIN)	10.800	7.800	7.350		25.950
6	Fanni Pigniczki (HUN)	11.200	7.750	7.000		25.950
7	Polina Horodnycha (UKR)	10.500	7.650	7.500		25.650
8	Evita Griskenas (USA)	10.100	7.750	7.050		24.900

=== Group all-around ===
Rank	Country	5	3 + 2	Total
1st place, gold medalist(s)	Azerbaijan	24.150	26.350	50.500
2nd place, silver medalist(s)	Ukraine	20.050	24.400	44.450
3rd place, bronze medalist(s)	Japan	19.050	22.500	41.550
4	Chinese Taipei	16.500	22.750	39.250
5	South Korea	15.950	19.300	35.250

=== 5 Ribbons ===
Rank	Country	D score	A score	E score	Penalty	Total
1st place, gold medalist(s)	Azerbaijan	10.500	6.800	5.550		22.850
2nd place, silver medalist(s)	Ukraine	9.200	6.500	5.500	-0.90	20.300
3rd place, bronze medalist(s)	South Korea	8.900	6.050	4.950	-0.05	19.850
4	Japan	8.100	6.350	4.950	-1.40	18.000
5	Chinese Taipei	7.600	5.100	3.450	-0.90	15.250

=== 3 Balls + 2 Hoops ===
Rank	Country	D score	A score	E score	Penalty	Total
1st place, gold medalist(s)	Ukraine	11.500	6.800	5.800		24.100
2nd place, silver medalist(s)	Azerbaijan	11.500	6.950	5.500		23.950
3rd place, bronze medalist(s)	Chinese Taipei	10.500	6.500	6.000		23.000
4	Japan	10.600	6.700	5.650	-0.30	22.650
5	South Korea	10.100	6.300	5.650		22.050
