= 2020 European Artistic Gymnastics Championships =

2020 European Artistic Gymnastics Championships refers to either of the following competitions held in Mersin, Turkey:

- 2020 European Men's Artistic Gymnastics Championships, held from 9 to 13 December 2020
- 2020 European Women's Artistic Gymnastics Championships, held from 17 to 20 December 2020
