= Siyana Vasileva =

Azerbaijani rhythmic gymnast (born 1996)

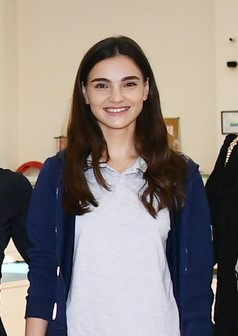
- Siyana Vasileva

Personal information
- Born: March 3, 1996 (age 30) Bulgaria
- Height: 168

Gymnastics career
- Discipline: Rhythmic gymnastics
- Country represented: Azerbaijan
- Club: Ocaq Sport club
- Retired: yes
Medal record
Representing Azerbaijan
Rhythmic Gymnastics
European Championships
Silver medal – second place	2014 Baku	3 Balls + 2 Ribbons
Bronze medal – third place	2018 Guadalajara	3 Balls + 2 Ropes
Junior European Championships
Bronze medal – third place	2011 Minsk	5 Ropes

Siyana Vasileva (Bulgarian: Сияна Василева; born 3 March 1996) is a retired Azerbaijani group rhythmic gymnast from Bulgaria. She is the 2014 European 3 Balls + 2 Ribbons silver and the 2018 European 3 Balls + 2 Ropes bronze medalist.

== Career ==
=== Senior ===
She competed at the European Championships in 2014 (Baku), where she was placed 2nd in the apparatus final with 3 ribbons and 2 balls. She also competed at the European Championships 2018 in Guadalarajara, Spain and was placed 3rd in the apparatus final with 3 balls and 2 ropes. She competed the 2018 World Championships in Sofia, Bulgaria, where she was placed 7th in Group All-around competition. She was also part of the group that took 8th place in All-around at the 2019 World Championships in Baku, Azerbaijan.

=== Post-competitive career ===
In 2021, she was elected FIG Athletes Representative in Rhythmic Gymnastics, as the successor to Liubou Charkashyna (BLR), who had been the athletes' representative of the World Gymnastics Federation for Rhythmic Gymnastics since 2013.

In 2024, she was sanctioned by the Gymnastics Ethics Foundation, along with her mother, Mariana Vasileva, and another coach, after an investigation found that she had hit a gymnast with a phone. She was required to undergo safeguarding training and monitoring.

== Personal life ==
While living in Bulgaria, she trained in rhythmic gymnastics as a child until aged 12 and competed for a short time as an individual gymnast, representing Bulgaria. She is the oldest daughter of Azerbaijani rhythmic gymnastics former head coach and deputy minister of sport Mariana Vasileva. Her mother, who was then the national coach of the Bulgarian rhythmic gymnastics team, was hired to coach the Azerbaijani national rhythmic gymnastics team. The Azerbaijani team was preparing for the European Rhythmic Gymnastics Championships in 2009, which were held in Baku. The family relocated from Sofia, Bulgaria and moved to Baku in October 2008. She has a younger sister named Valeria, who also trained as a rhythmic gymnast.

She attended the Azerbaijan State Academy of Physical Education and Sport. In addition to her native Bulgarian, she speaks fluent Azeri, Russian, and English. She lives in Baku and is studying as of 2022 with the goal of becoming a psychologist.

== See also ==
- Nationality changes in gymnastics
