= Mariana Vasileva =

Azerbaijani rhythmic gymnastics trainer (born 1974)

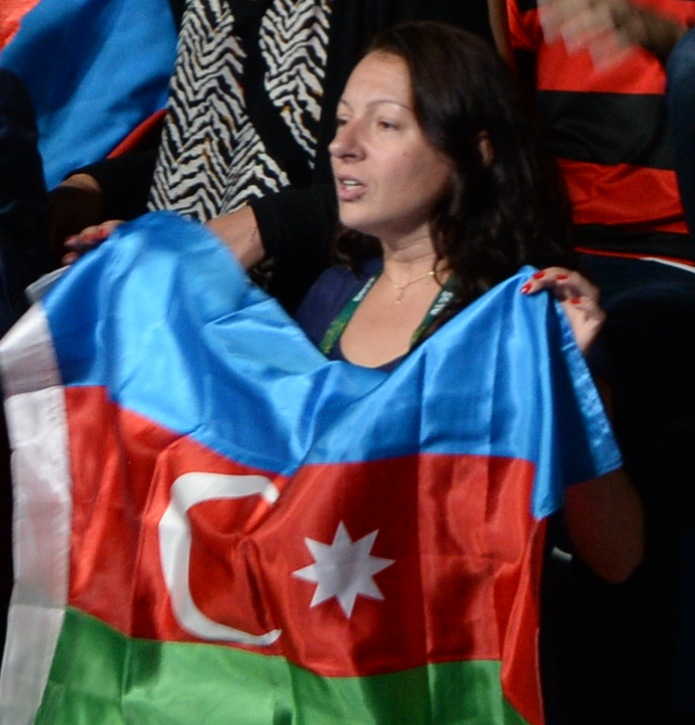

Deputy Minister of Youth and Sports
- In office 29 November 2021 – 16 January 2025
- Appointed by: Ilham Aliyev
- Minister: Farid Gayibov
- Preceded by: Ismayil Ismayilov

Personal details
- Born: 6 July 1974 (age 51) Targovishte, Bulgaria

Mariana Vasileva-Toteva (Bulgarian: Мариана Василева Тотева, born 6 July 1974 in Bulgaria) is an Azerbaijani rhythmic gymnastics trainer of Bulgarian origin who is the former Deputy Minister of Youth and Sports of Azerbaijan (2021–2025) and former head coach of the Azerbaijan Rhythmic Gymnastics Federation.

== Career ==
Vasileva was a former Bulgarian rhythmic gymnast and worked as a coach in Levski club in Sofia, Bulgaria. In 2007, she received an invitation from the Azerbaijan Gymnastics Federation to work as coach; not long after; she relocated to Baku, Azerbaijan with her immediate family (husband and two children).

In 2009, Vasileva was appointed as head coach of the Azerbaijan Rhythmic Gymnastics Federation. In 2013 she received the title of Honored Trainer of Azerbaijan. In 2015, after the successful performance of the national team at the 1st European Games, she was awarded the Honorary Diploma of the President of Azerbaijan. During the coaching period of Mariana Vasileva, the Azerbaijani national team managed to win prizes at the European Championships in 2009, 2011, 2013, 2014, 2018, 2020, 2022 and 2023. As of 29 November 2021, she is the Deputy Minister of Youth and Sports of Azerbaijan.

Notable students include:

- Marina Durunda (born 1997) - multiple World Cup medalist
- Lala Yusifova (born 1996) - 2012, 2013 (Grand Prix Final) medalist
- Zhala Piriyeva (born 2000) - European Junior medalist
- Arzu Jalilova (born 2004) - World and European Junior medalist
- Zohra Aghamirova (born 2001) - Summer Universiade (2019) medalist

In July 2020, a case was brought against Vasileva at the Gymnastics Ethics Foundation for psychological and physical abuse of multiple gymnasts. An investigation found that she had beat gymnasts for gaining weight, required them to train when they were not healthy enough to do so, withheld money from athletes, and prevented them from contacting their families. In December 2024, she was sanctioned and was not allowed to participate in any International Gymnastics Federation activities for eight years or be the head coach of any federation for life. Her daughter Siyana and another coach were also sanctioned, and the Azerbaijan Gymnastics Federation was held liable for their actions.

On January 16, 2025, Vasileva-Toteva was dismissed from the position of Deputy Minister of Youth and Sports.

== Personal life ==
Mariana Vasileva is a citizen of Azerbaijan but retains her Bulgarian citizenship. She speaks Bulgarian, Azerbaijani and Russian. She is married and has two daughters: Siyana and Valeria. Siyana Vasileva has competed for the Azerbaijani rhythmic gymnastics team and is the youngest naturalized athlete in the history of the country.
