= Gymnastics at the 2020 Summer Olympics =

Gymnastics at the Games of the XXXII Olympiad
- Pictograms for artistic gymnastics (left), rhythmic gymnastics (center), and trampolining (right)
- Venue: Ariake Gymnastics Centre
- Dates: 24 July – 8 August 2021
- No. of events: 18
- Competitors: 324 (114 men, 210 women from 63 nations

Gymnastics at the 2020 Summer Olympics in Tokyo was held in three categories: artistic gymnastics, rhythmic gymnastics and trampolining. All gymnastics events were staged at the Olympic Gymnastic Centre, Tokyo in 2021.

The programme for 2020 remained unchanged from 2016, despite an application from the FIG for the admission of a new parkour based event. The application had proved contentious with specialist parkour or freerunning organisations lobbying for the sport not to be included, and to be recognized as an entirely separate sport from gymnastics.

Originally planned as a temporary venue, in 2016, the Tokyo 2020 authorities confirmed the Olympic Gymnastic Centre would become a permanent venue, functioning as a convention centre after the Games. Before its refurbishment, the venue was also expected to host the Boccia event at the 2020 Summer Paralympics.

There was one unbroken tie in artistic gymnastics: bronze in the women's floor final.

== Qualification ==
The qualification pathway for the 2020 Summer Olympics was significantly overhauled and modified from 2016. The men's and women's team events in artistic gymnastics were reduced from five members per team to four, while further allocations were available for up to two specialists.

In a further move to link several FIG competitions to the Olympic Games, qualification places will now be available based on an aggregate of scores achieved over the Artistic Gymnastics World Cup series, and the various continental artistic gymnastics championships.

== Schedule ==
Q	Qualification	F	Finals

Gymnastics schedule
Date	July 24	July 25	July 26	July 27	July 28	July 29	July 30	July 31	Aug 1	Aug 2	Aug 3	Aug 4	Aug 5	Aug 6	Aug 7	Aug 8
Artistic
Men's team all-around	Q		F													
Men's individual all-around	Q				F											
Men's floor	Q								F							
Men's pommel horse	Q								F							
Men's rings	Q									F						
Men's vault	Q									F						
Men's parallel bars	Q										F					
Men's horizontal bar	Q										F					
Women's team all-around		Q		F												
Women's individual all-around		Q				F										
Women's vault		Q							F							
Women's uneven bars		Q							F							
Women's balance beam		Q									F					
Women's floor		Q								F						
Rhythmic
Women's group all-around															Q	F
Women's individual all-around														Q	F	
Trampoline
Men's trampoline								F								
Women's trampoline							F									

== Participation ==
=== Participating nations ===
Japan, as the host country, receives a guaranteed spot, in case it were not to earn one by the regular qualifying methods.

- Albania (1)
- Argentina (1)
- Armenia (1)
- Australia (11)
- Austria (1)
- Azerbaijan (8)
- Belarus (11)
- Belgium (4)
- Brazil (12)
- Bulgaria (8)
- Canada (7)
- Cape Verde (1)
- Cayman Islands (1)
- Chile (2)
- China (21)
- Colombia (1)
- Costa Rica (1)
- Croatia (2)
- Cuba (1)
- Cyprus (1)
- Czech Republic (1)
- Egypt (11)
- France (9)
- Georgia (1)
- Germany (8)
- Great Britain (10)
- Greece (1)
- Hong Kong (1)
- Hungary (2)
- India (1)
- Ireland (2)
- Israel (10)
- Italy (14)
- Jamaica (1)
- Japan (22) (host)
- Kazakhstan (2)
- Lithuania (1)
- Malaysia (2)
- Mexico (4)
- Netherlands (6)
- New Zealand (3)
- Nigeria (1)
- Norway (2)
- Peru (1)
- Philippines (1)
- Poland (1)
- Portugal (2)
- Romania (3)
- ROC (23)
- Singapore (1)
- Slovakia (1)
- Slovenia (1)
- South Africa (2)
- South Korea (7)
- Spain (9)
- Sri Lanka (1)
- Sweden (2)
- Switzerland (5)
- Chinese Taipei (5)
- Turkey (5)
- Ukraine (13)
- United States (20)
- Uzbekistan (8)
- Vietnam (2)

== Medal summary ==
=== Medal table ===
* Host nation (Japan)

Rank	NOC	Gold	Silver	Bronze	Total
1	China	4	5	2	11
2	ROC	2	4	4	10
3	United States	2	2	2	6
4	Japan*	2	1	2	5
5	Israel	2	0	0	2
6	Brazil	1	1	0	2
7	Great Britain	1	0	2	3
8	Belarus	1	0	1	2
8	South Korea	1	0	1	2
10	Belgium	1	0	0	1
10	Bulgaria	1	0	0	1
12	Italy	0	1	1	2
13	Chinese Taipei	0	1	0	1
13	Croatia	0	1	0	1
13	Germany	0	1	0	1
13	Spain	0	1	0	1
17	Armenia	0	0	1	1
17	Greece	0	0	1	1
17	New Zealand	0	0	1	1
17	Turkey	0	0	1	1
Totals (20 entries)		18	18	19	55

=== Artistic gymnastics ===
Men

Games	Gold	Silver	Bronze
Team all-around	ROC; Denis Ablyazin; David Belyavskiy; Artur Dalaloyan; Nikita Nagornyy	Japan; Daiki Hashimoto; Kazuma Kaya; Takeru Kitazono; Wataru Tanigawa	China; Lin Chaopan; Sun Wei; Xiao Ruoteng; Zou Jingyuan
Individual all-around	Daiki Hashimoto; Japan	Xiao Ruoteng; China	Nikita Nagornyy; ROC
Floor exercise	Artem Dolgopyat; Israel	Rayderley Zapata; Spain	Xiao Ruoteng; China
Pommel horse	Max Whitlock; Great Britain	Lee Chih-kai; Chinese Taipei	Kazuma Kaya; Japan
Rings	Liu Yang; China	You Hao; China	Eleftherios Petrounias; Greece
Vault	Shin Jea-hwan; South Korea	Denis Ablyazin; ROC	Artur Davtyan; Armenia
Parallel bars	Zou Jingyuan; China	Lukas Dauser; Germany	Ferhat Arıcan; Turkey
Horizontal bar	Daiki Hashimoto; Japan	Tin Srbić; Croatia	Nikita Nagornyy; ROC

Women

Games	Gold	Silver	Bronze
Team all-around	ROC; Lilia Akhaimova; Viktoria Listunova; Angelina Melnikova; Vladislava Urazova	United States; Simone Biles; Jordan Chiles; Sunisa Lee; Grace McCallum	Great Britain; Jennifer Gadirova; Jessica Gadirova; Alice Kinsella; Amelie Morgan
Individual all-around	Sunisa Lee; United States	Rebeca Andrade; Brazil	Angelina Melnikova; ROC
Vault	Rebeca Andrade; Brazil	MyKayla Skinner; United States	Yeo Seo-jeong; South Korea
Uneven bars	Nina Derwael; Belgium	Anastasia Ilyankova; ROC	Sunisa Lee; United States
Balance beam	Guan Chenchen; China	Tang Xijing; China	Simone Biles; United States
Floor exercise	Jade Carey; United States	Vanessa Ferrari; Italy	Mai Murakami; Japan
Floor exercise	Jade Carey; United States	Vanessa Ferrari; Italy	Angelina Melnikova; ROC

=== Rhythmic gymnastics ===
Games	Gold	Silver	Bronze
Group all-around	Bulgaria; Simona Dyankova; Stefani Kiryakova; Madlen Radukanova; Laura Traets; Erika Zafirova	ROC; Anastasiia Bliznyuk; Anastasiia Maksimova; Angelina Shkatova; Anastasiia Tatareva; Alisa Tishchenko	Italy; Martina Centofanti; Agnese Duranti; Alessia Maurelli; Daniela Mogurean; Martina Santandrea
Individual all-around	Linoy Ashram; Israel	Dina Averina; ROC	Alina Harnasko; Belarus

=== Trampoline ===
Games	Gold	Silver	Bronze
Men's individual	Ivan Litvinovich; Belarus	Dong Dong; China	Dylan Schmidt; New Zealand
Women's individual	Zhu Xueying; China	Liu Lingling; China	Bryony Page; Great Britain

== See also ==
- Gymnastics at the 2018 Asian Games
- Gymnastics at the 2018 Commonwealth Games
- Gymnastics at the 2018 Summer Youth Olympics
- Gymnastics at the 2019 African Games
- Gymnastics at the 2019 European Games
- Gymnastics at the 2019 Pan American Games
- Gymnastics at the 2019 Summer Universiade
