= Madlen Radukanova =

Bulgarian rhythmic gymnast

- Full name: Madlen Milenova Radukanova
- Alternative name: Madi
- Born: 14 May 2000 (age 26) Sofia, Bulgaria
- Height: 173 cm (5 ft 8 in)

Gymnastics career
- Discipline: Rhythmic gymnastics
- Country represented: Bulgaria
- Former countries represented: Bulgaria
- Club: Levski-Triadica
- Head coach: Vesela Dimitrova
- Assistant coach: Mihaela Maevska
- Choreographer: Margarita Budinova
Medal record
Representing Bulgaria
| Event | 1st | 2nd | 3rd |
|---|---|---|---|
| Olympic Games | 1 | 0 | 0 |
| World Championships | 1 | 2 | 3 |
| FIG World Cup | 24 | 19 | 7 |
| European Games | 0 | 2 | 1 |
| European Championships | 2 | 1 | 2 |
| Total | 28 | 24 | 13 |
Group Rhythmic Gymnastics
Olympic Games
| Gold medal – first place | 2020 Tokyo | Group All-around |
World Championships
| Gold medal – first place | 2018 Sofia | 5 Hoops |
| Silver medal – second place | 2017 Pesaro | Group All-around |
| Silver medal – second place | 2019 Baku | 5 Balls |
| Bronze medal – third place | 2017 Pesaro | 3 Balls + 2 Ropes |
| Bronze medal – third place | 2018 Sofia | Group All-around |
| Bronze medal – third place | 2019 Baku | Group All-around |
European Games
| Silver medal – second place | 2019 Minsk | Group All-around |
| Silver medal – second place | 2019 Minsk | 5 Balls |
| Bronze medal – third place | 2019 Minsk | 3 Hoops and 4 Clubs |
European Championships
| Gold medal – first place | 2018 Guadalajara | 3 Balls + 2 Ropes |
| Gold medal – first place | 2021 Varna | 5 Balls |
| Silver medal – second place | 2021 Varna | 3 Hoops + 4 Clubs |
| Bronze medal – third place | 2018 Guadalajara | Team |
| Bronze medal – third place | 2018 Guadalajara | Group All-around |
Junior European Championships
| Bronze medal – third place | 2015 Minsk | 5 Balls |

Madlen Milenova Radukanova (Bulgarian: Мадлен Миленова Радуканова; born 14 May 2000) is a Bulgarian group rhythmic gymnast. She is the 2020 Olympic group all-around champion and the 2018 World 5 hoops champion. She is a two-time European champion, a two-time (2018, 2019) World group all-around bronze medalist, the 2017 World group all-around silver medalist, and the 2018 European group all-around bronze medalist.

== Personal life ==
Radukanova's father Milen Radukanov was a Bulgarian professional football player and coach. Her first cousin Kristen Radukanova is an athlete, competing in 60, 100 and 200 m running.

She is dating a Bulgarian judoka, Bozhidar Temelkov, who competed at World and European Championships. On January 3, 2024, she gave birth to a daughter Karina. In November 2026, she announced on her Instagram that they are expecting a baby boy.

== Career ==
Radukanova began rhythmic gymnastics when she was five years old.

=== Junior ===
She represented Bulgaria at the 2015 European Championships in Minsk, Belarus, as a member of the junior group alongside Teodora Aleksandrova, Vivian Chernookova, Madlen Sergeeva and Staniela Yovcheva. They won bronze medal in 5 balls final.

=== Senior ===
==== 2017 ====
Radukanova began competing with Bulgaria's main senior group in 2017. At the Pesaro World Cup, she won the gold medal in the group all-around and the silver medal in the 5 hoops final. The Bulgarian group won another group all-around gold medal at the Baku World Cup and a silver medal in 3 balls + 2 ropes and a bronze medal in 5 hoops. Then at the Sofia World Cup, they won another group all-around gold and silver medals in both apparatus finals behind Ukraine. She competed at the 2017 World Championships alongside Elena Bineva, Simona Dyankova, Laura Traets, and Teodora Aleksandrova. They won the silver medal in the group all-around behind Russia and the bronze medal in the 3 balls + 2 ropes final behind Russia and Japan. They also placed fourth in the 5 hoops final.

==== 2018 ====
At the Sofia World Cup, Radukanova and the Bulgarian group won gold in the group all-around and in 5 hoops and bronze in 3 balls + 2 ropes. Then at the Baku World Cup they won gold in both apparatus finals but lost the group all-around to Italy. They won another group all-around gold medal at the Guadalajara World Challenge Cup in addition to winning gold in 3 balls + 2 ropes and silver in 5 hoops. She then competed at the European Championships alongside Elena Bineva, Simona Dyankova, Laura Traets, and Stefani Kiryakova. They won the bronze medal in the group all-around behind Russia and Italy and placed fourth in the 5 hoops final. In the 3 balls + 2 ropes final, they won the gold medal, and they won a team bronze medal with the individual juniors. Then at the Kazan World Challenge Cup, they won the group all-around bronze medal behind Italy and Russia, and they won silver in 5 hoops behind Russia. The same group competed at the World Championships in Sofia where they won the group all-around bronze medal behind Russia and Italy and qualified for the 2020 Olympic Games. They then won the gold medal in the 5 hoops final and placed sixth in 3 balls + 2 ropes.

==== 2019 ====
Radukanova competed with Stefani Kiryakova, Simona Dyankova, Laura Traets, and Erika Zafirova during the 2019 season. The group won the gold medal in the 3 hoops + 4 clubs final and the silver medal in the group all-around at the Pesaro World Cup. Then at the Sofia World Cup, they won the group all-around gold medal. She represented Bulgaria at the 2019 European Games where the Bulgarian group won silver in the group all-around by only 0.050 behind Belarus. They also won the silver medal in the 5 balls final, this time behind Russia. In the 3 hoops + 4 clubs final, they won the bronze medal behind Belarus and Ukraine. She then competed at the World Championships in Baku where the Bulgarian group won the bronze medal in the group all-around behind Russia and Japan. They then won the silver medal behind Japan in the 5 balls final, and they placed fifth in the 3 hoops + 4 clubs final.

==== 2021 ====
The Bulgarian team began their year at the Sofia World Cup, where the team won gold in the group all-around and in both apparatus finals. They once again swept the gold medals at the Baku World Cup. She then competed at the European Championships in Varna, Bulgaria. The Bulgarian team of the senior group, Boryana Kaleyn, and Katrin Taseva finished in fourth place. The Bulgarian group finished fifth in the all-around, but they won gold in the 5 balls final and won silver in the 3 hoops + 4 clubs final behind Israel.

Radukanova was selected to represent Bulgaria at the 2020 Summer Olympics alongside Laura Traets, Stefani Kiryakova, Simona Dyankova, and Erika Zafirova. Radukanova competed at the Olympic Games with stress fractures in her ankle. In the qualification round, the group qualified in first place after receiving the highest scores for both of their routines. In the group all-around final, they once again received the highest scores for both routines and won the gold medal with a total score of 92.100, 1.400 points ahead of Russia. This marked the first time a non-Russian team won the Olympic gold medal in the group all-around since Spain won in 1996, and it was the first time Bulgaria won the Olympic group all-around competition. The Bulgarian group withdrew from the World Championships in Kitakyushu, Japan, four days before the start of the competition, after an injury to Traets.

== Detailed Olympic results ==
| Year | Competition Description | Location | Music | Apparatus | Rank | Score-Final | Rank | Score-Qualifying |
|---|---|---|---|---|---|---|---|---|
| 2020 | Olympics | Tokyo | | All-around | 1st | 92.100 | 1st | 91.800 |
| 2020 | Olympics | Tokyo | Water, Cosmos, Earth by Elica Todorova, Stoyan Yankoulov, Miroslav Ivanov | 5 Balls | 1st | 47.550 | 1st | 47.500 |
| 2020 | Olympics | Tokyo | Spartacus, ballet in 3 acts, op.8 by Aram Khachaturian, Bolshoi Theatre | 3 Hoops + 4 Clubs | 1st | 44.550 | 1st | 44.300 |
