= Simona Dyankova =

Bulgarian rhythmic gymnast

- Full name: Simona Dyanova Dyankova
- Born: 7 December 1994 (age 31) Varna, Bulgaria
- Height: 167 cm (5 ft 6 in)

Gymnastics career
- Discipline: Rhythmic gymnastics
- Country represented: Bulgaria; (2013-2021)
- Former countries represented: Bulgaria
- Club: Char DKS Varna
- Head coach: Vesela Dimitrova
- Assistant coach: Mihaela Maevska
- Choreographer: Margarita Budinova
Medal record
Representing Bulgaria
Group Rhythmic Gymnastics
Event	1st	2nd	3rd
Olympic Games	1	0	0
World Championships	1	2	3
European Games	0	2	1
European Championships	2	1	2
FIG World Cup	24	19	7
Total	28	24	13
Olympic Games
Gold medal – first place	2020 Tokyo	Group All-around
World Championships
Gold medal – first place	2018 Sofia	5 Hoops
Silver medal – second place	2017 Pesaro	Group All-around
Silver medal – second place	2019 Baku	5 Balls
Bronze medal – third place	2017 Pesaro	3 Balls + 2 Ropes
Bronze medal – third place	2018 Sofia	Group All-around
Bronze medal – third place	2019 Baku	Group All-around
European Games
Silver medal – second place	2019 Minsk	Group all-around
Silver medal – second place	2019 Minsk	5 Balls
Bronze medal – third place	2019 Minsk	3 Hoops and 4 Clubs
European Championships
Gold medal – first place	2018 Guadalajara	3 Balls + 2 Ropes
Gold medal – first place	2021 Varna	5 Balls
Silver medal – second place	2021 Varna	3 Hoops + 4 Clubs
Bronze medal – third place	2018 Guadalajara	Team
Bronze medal – third place	2018 Guadalajara	Group All-around

Simona Dyanova Dyankova (Bulgarian: Симона Дянова Дянкова; born 7 December 1994) is a Bulgarian former group rhythmic gymnast. She is the 2020 Olympic group all-around champion and the 2018 World 5 hoops champion. She is a two-time (2018, 2019) World group all-around bronze medalist, the 2017 World group all-around silver medalist, and the 2018 European group all-around bronze medalist.

== Career ==
Dyankova began rhythmic gymnastics when she was six years old. She was a reserve for Bulgaria's main senior group in 2014, 2015, and 2016.

=== 2017 ===
Dyankova began competing with Bulgaria's main senior group in 2017. At the Pesaro World Cup, she won the gold medal in the group all-around and the silver medal in the 5 hoops final. The Bulgarian group won another group all-around gold medal at the Baku World Cup and a silver medal in 3 balls + 2 ropes and a bronze medal in 5 hoops. Then at the Sofia World Cup, they won another group all-around gold and silver medals in both apparatus finals behind Ukraine. She competed at the 2017 World Championships alongside Elena Bineva, Madlen Radukanova, Laura Traets and Teodora Aleksandrova. They won the silver medal in the group all-around behind Russia and the bronze medal in the 3 balls + 2 ropes final behind Russia and Japan. They also placed fourth in the 5 hoops final.

=== 2018 ===
At the Sofia World Cup, Dyankova and the Bulgarian group won gold in the group all-around and in 5 hoops and bronze in 3 balls + 2 ropes. Then at the Baku World Cup they won gold in both apparatus finals but lost the group all-around to Italy. They won another group all-around gold medal at the Guadalajara World Challenge Cup in addition to winning gold in 3 balls + 2 ropes and silver in 5 hoops. She then competed at the European Championships alongside Elena Bineva, Madlen Radukanova, Laura Traets, and Stefani Kiryakova. They won the bronze medal in the group all-around behind Russia and Italy and placed fourth in the 5 hoops final. In the 3 balls + 2 ropes final, they won the gold medal, and they won a team bronze medal with the individual juniors. Then at the Kazan World Challenge Cup, they won the group all-around bronze medal behind Italy and Russia, and they won silver in 5 hoops behind Russia. The same group competed at the World Championships in Sofia where they won the group all-around bronze medal behind Russia and Italy and qualified for the 2020 Olympic Games. They then won the gold medal in the 5 hoops final and placed sixth in 3 balls + 2 ropes.

=== 2019 ===
Dyankova competed with Stefani Kiryakova, Madlen Radukanova, Laura Traets, and Erika Zafirova during the 2019 season. The group won the gold medal in the 3 hoops + 4 clubs final and the silver medal in the group all-around at the Pesaro World Cup. Then at the Sofia World Cup, they won the group all-around gold medal. She represented Bulgaria at the 2019 European Games where the Bulgarian group won silver in the group all-around by only 0.050 behind Belarus. They also won the silver medal in the 5 balls final, this time behind Russia. In the 3 hoops + 4 clubs final, they won the bronze medal behind Belarus and Ukraine. She then competed at the World Championships in Baku where the Bulgarian group won the bronze medal in the group all-around behind Russia and Japan. They then won the silver medal behind Japan in the 5 balls final, and they placed fifth in the 3 hoops + 4 clubs final.

=== 2021 ===
The Bulgarian team began their year at the Sofia World Cup, where the team won gold in the group all-around and in both apparatus finals. They once again swept the gold medals at the Baku World Cup. She then competed at the European Championships in Varna, Bulgaria. The Bulgarian team of the senior group, Boryana Kaleyn, and Katrin Taseva finished in fourth place. The Bulgarian group finished fifth in the all-around, but they won gold in the 5 balls final and won silver in the 3 hoops + 4 clubs final behind Israel.

Dyankova was selected to represent Bulgaria at the 2020 Summer Olympics alongside Laura Traets, Stefani Kiryakova, Madlen Radukanova, and Erika Zafirova. In the qualification round, the group qualified in first place after receiving the highest scores for both of their routines. In the group all-around final, they once again received the highest scores for both routines and won the gold medal with a total score of 92.100, 1.400 points ahead of Russia. This marked the first time a non-Russian team won the Olympic gold medal in the group all-around since Spain won in 1996, and it was the first time Bulgaria won the Olympic group all-around competition. Dyankova was selected to be the flag bearer for Bulgaria in the closing ceremonies.

The Bulgarian group withdrew from the World Championships in Kitakyushu, Japan, four days before the start of the competition, after an injury to Laura Traets. Dyankova announced her retirement on 28 October 2021.

== Personal life ==
She maintains close friendships with her former group Olympic teammates. Dyankova got engaged to retired Bulgarian footballer Nikola Yanachkov in 2021. They got married on November 5, 2023, after 9 years of dating. She has a younger sister named Polina and graduated high school from SVEO "A.S. Pushki, which focused on Italian language studies instruction. She resides in Sofia, Bulgaria and has two poodles. She was the capital of the Bulgarian rhythmic gymnastics team until her retirement from competitive sports in 2021, following the Tokyo Olympic Games.

== Detailed results ==
Year	Competition Description	Location	Music	Apparatus	Rank	Score-Final	Rank	Score-Qualifying
2020	Olympics	Tokyo		All-around	1st	92.100	1st	91.800
2020	Olympics	Tokyo	Water, Cosmos, Earth by Elica Todorova, Stoyan Yankoulov, Miroslav Ivanov	5 Balls	1st	47.550	1st	47.500
2020	Olympics	Tokyo	Spartacus, ballet in 3 acts, op.8 by Aram Khachaturian, Bolshoi Theatre	3 Hoops + 4 Clubs	1st	44.550	1st	44.300
