= Elitsa =

Elitsa (Bulgarian: Елица) is a Bulgarian feminine given name that may refer to

- Elitsa Kostova (born 1990), Bulgarian tennis player
- Elitsa Todorova (born 1977), Bulgarian folk singer and percussionist
  - Elitsa & Stoyan, Bulgarian music duo
- Elitsa Vasileva (born 1990), Bulgarian volleyball player
- Elitsa Yankova (born 1994), Bulgarian freestyle wrestler
