= Laura Traets =

Bulgarian rhythmic gymnast (born 1998)

- Full name: Laura Jean Pierre Traets
- Alternative name: Laura Traats
- Nickname: Lauri
- Born: 13 December 1998 (age 27) Sofia, Bulgaria
- Height: 168 cm (5 ft 6 in)

Gymnastics career
- Discipline: Rhythmic gymnastics
- Country represented: Bulgaria; (2011-2021)
- Club: Levski-Triadica
- Gym: Rakovski
- Head coach: Vesela Dimitrova
- Assistant coach: Mihaela Maevska
- Choreographer: Margarita Budinova
Medal record
Group Rhythmic Gymnastics
Event	1st	2nd	3rd
Olympic Games	1	0	0
World Championships	1	2	3
European Games	0	2	1
European Championships	2	1	2
FIG World Cup	24	19	7
Total	28	24	13
Representing Bulgaria
Olympic Games
Gold medal – first place	2020 Tokyo	Group All-around
World Championships
Gold medal – first place	2018 Sofia	5 Hoops
Silver medal – second place	2017 Pesaro	Group All-around
Silver medal – second place	2019 Baku	5 Balls
Bronze medal – third place	2017 Pesaro	3 Balls + 2 Ropes
Bronze medal – third place	2018 Sofia	Group All-around
Bronze medal – third place	2019 Baku	Group All-around
European Games
Silver medal – second place	2019 Minsk	Group All-around
Silver medal – second place	2019 Minsk	5 Balls
Bronze medal – third place	2019 Minsk	3 Hoops and 4 Clubs
European Championships
Gold medal – first place	2018 Guadalajara	3 Balls + 2 Ropes
Gold medal – first place	2021 Varna	5 Balls
Silver medal – second place	2021 Varna	3 Hoops + 4 Clubs
Bronze medal – third place	2018 Guadalajara	Team
Bronze medal – third place	2018 Guadalajara	Group All-around
Junior European Championships
Bronze medal – third place	2013 Vienna	Group All-around

Laura Jean Pierre Traets (Bulgarian: Лаура Жан Пиер Траатс, born 13 December 1998) is a Bulgarian former group rhythmic gymnast who now works as a coach. She is the 2020 Olympic champion in the group all-around. She is the 2018 World and 2021 European champion in 5 balls and the 2018 European champion in 3 balls + 2 ropes. She is a two-time (2018, 2019) World group all-around bronze medalist and the 2017 World group all-around silver medalist. On the junior level, she is the 2013 European group all-around bronze medalist.

== Personal life ==
Traets' father is from the Netherlands, and until adulthood, she held both Bulgarian and Dutch citizenships. In October 2021, Traets became an honorary citizen of Velingrad, where she had grown up, the youngest person to date to receive this distinction.

On 7 July 2023 she announced on her Instagram profile that she got engaged to her boyfriend, Martin Stefanov. They got married on 7 July 2025.

In December 2023, she launched her own YouTube podcast, 'Beyond the Podium'. It features interviews with successful rhythmic gymnastics coaches or champions after their sports careers have ended.

== Career ==
Traets started rhythmic gymnastics at the age of four in Levski Triaditza Sports Club.

=== 2013 ===
Traets competed with the Bulgarian junior group at the European Championships in Vienna. The group won the all-around bronze medal behind the Russian and Belarusian groups. They then placed fifth in the five hoops final.

=== 2017 ===
Traets began competing with Bulgaria's main senior group in 2017. At the Pesaro World Cup, Traets won the gold medal in the group all-around and the silver medal in the 5 hoops final. The Bulgarian group won another group all-around gold medal at the Baku World Cup and a silver medal in 3 balls + 2 ropes and a bronze medal in 5 hoops. Then at the Sofia World Cup, they won another group all-around gold and silver medals in both apparatus finals behind Ukraine. She competed at the 2017 World Championships alongside Elena Bineva, Madlen Radukanova, Simona Dyankova and Teodora Aleksandrova. They won the silver medal in the group all-around behind Russia and the bronze medal in the 3 balls + 2 ropes final behind Russia and Japan. They also placed fourth in the 5 hoops final.

=== 2018 ===
At the Sofia World Cup, Traets and the Bulgarian group won gold in the group all-around and in 5 hoops and bronze in 3 balls + 2 ropes. Then at the Baku World Cup they won gold in both apparatus finals but lost the group all-around to Italy. They won another group all-around gold medal at the Guadalajara World Challenge Cup in addition to winning gold in 3 balls + 2 ropes and silver in 5 hoops. She then competed at the European Championships alongside Elena Bineva, Madlen Radukanova, Simona Dyankova, and Stefani Kiryakova. They won the bronze medal in the group all-around behind Russia and Italy and placed fourth in the 5 hoops final. In the 3 balls + 2 ropes final, they won the gold medal, and they won a team bronze medal with the individual juniors. Then at the Kazan World Challenge Cup, they won the group all-around bronze medal behind Italy and Russia, and they won silver in 5 hoops behind Russia. The same group competed at the World Championships in Sofia where they won the group all-around bronze medal behind Russia and Italy and qualified for the 2020 Olympic Games. They then won the gold medal in the 5 hoops final and placed sixth in 3 balls + 2 ropes.

=== 2019 ===
Traets competed with Stefani Kiryakova, Madlen Radukanova, Simona Dyankova, and Erika Zafirova during the 2019 season. The group won the gold medal in the 3 hoops + 4 clubs final and the silver medal in the group all-around at the Pesaro World Cup. Then at the Sofia World Cup, they won the group all-around gold medal. She represented Bulgaria at the 2019 European Games where the Bulgarian group won silver in the group all-around by only 0.050 behind Belarus. They also won the silver medal in the 5 balls final, this time behind Russia. In the 3 hoops + 4 clubs final, they won the bronze medal behind Belarus and Ukraine. She then competed at the World Championships in Baku where the Bulgarian group won the bronze medal in the group all-around behind Russia and Japan. They then won the silver medal behind Japan in the 5 balls final, and they placed fifth in the 3 hoops + 4 clubs final.

=== 2021 ===
Traets and the Bulgarian team began their year at the Sofia World Cup, where the team won gold in the group all-around and in both apparatus finals. They once again swept the gold medals at the Baku World Cup. She then competed at the European Championships in Varna, Bulgaria. The Bulgarian team of the senior group, Boryana Kaleyn, and Katrin Taseva finished in fourth place. The Bulgarian group finished fifth in the all-around, but they won gold in the 5 balls final and won silver in the 3 hoops + 4 clubs final behind Israel.

Traets was selected to represent Bulgaria at the 2020 Summer Olympics alongside Simona Dyankova, Stefani Kiryakova, Madlen Radukanova, and Erika Zafirova. In the qualification round, the group qualified in first place after receiving the highest scores for both of their routines. In the group all-around final, they once again received the highest scores for both routines and won the gold medal with a total score of 92.100, 1.400 points ahead of Russia. This marked the first time a non-Russian team won the Olympic gold medal in the group all-around since Spain won in 1996, and it was the first time Bulgaria won the Olympic group all-around competition.

The Bulgarian group withdrew from the World Championships in Kitakyushu, Japan, four days before the start of the competition, because Traets was injured. It was later revealed that Traets had a cervical discal hernia for several years that was now causing severe pain in her right arm. She traveled to Switzerland for surgery in December.

== Post-competitive career ==
In November 2025, Traets became the head coach of the Kuwait national team.

== Detailed Olympic results ==
Year	Competition Description	Location	Music	Apparatus	Rank	Score-Final	Rank	Score-Qualifying
2020	Olympics	Tokyo		All-around	1st	92.100	1st	91.800
2020	Olympics	Tokyo	Water, Cosmos, Earth by Elica Todorova, Stoyan Yankoulov, Miroslav Ivanov	5 Balls	1st	47.550	1st	47.500
2020	Olympics	Tokyo	Spartacus, ballet in 3 acts, op.8 by Aram Khachaturian, Bolshoi Theatre	3 Hoops + 4 Clubs	1st	44.550	1st	44.300
