= Stefani Kiryakova =

Bulgarian group rhythmic gymnast

- Full name: Stefani Radoslavova Kiryakova
- Alternative names: Stefi, Stefche
- Born: 5 January 2001 (age 25) Burgas, Bulgaria
- Height: 172 cm (5 ft 8 in)

Gymnastics career
- Discipline: Rhythmic gymnastics
- Country represented: Bulgaria; (2017-2021)
- Head coach: Vesela Dimitrova
- Assistant coach: Mihaela Maevska
- Choreographer: Margarita Budinova
Medal record
Representing Bulgaria
Group Rhythmic Gymnastics
Olympic Games
Gold medal – first place	2020 Tokyo	Group All-around
World Championships
Gold medal – first place	2018 Sofia	5 Hoops
Silver medal – second place	2019 Baku	5 Balls
Bronze medal – third place	2018 Sofia	Group All-around
Bronze medal – third place	2019 Baku	Group All-around
European Games
Silver medal – second place	2019 Minsk	Group All-around
Silver medal – second place	2019 Minsk	5 Balls
Bronze medal – third place	2019 Minsk	3 Hoops and 4 Clubs
European Championships
Gold medal – first place	2018 Guadalajara	3 Balls + 2 Ropes
Gold medal – first place	2021 Varna	5 Balls
Silver medal – second place	2021 Varna	3 Hoops + 4 Clubs
Bronze medal – third place	2018 Guadalajara	Team
Bronze medal – third place	2018 Guadalajara	Group All-around

Stefani Radoslavova Kiryakova (Bulgarian: Стефани Радославова Кирякова; born 5 January 2001) is a Bulgarian group rhythmic gymnast. She is the 2020 Olympic group all-around champion and the 2018 World 5 hoops champion. She is a two-time (2018, 2019) World group all-around bronze medalist and the 2018 European group all-around bronze medalist. She is also a two-time European champion.

== Career ==
Kiryakova began rhythmic gymnastics when she was six years old.

=== 2018 ===
In 2018, Kiryakova became part of the main senior group with Elena Bineva, Simona Dyankova, Laura Traets, and Madlen Radukanova, replacing the injured Teodora Aleksandrova. At the Sofia World Cup, they won gold in the group all-around and in 5 hoops and bronze in 3 balls + 2 ropes. Then at the Baku World Cup they won gold in both apparatus finals but lost the group all-around to Italy. They won another group all-around gold medal at the Guadalajara World Challenge Cup in addition to winning gold in 3 balls + 2 ropes and silver in 5 hoops. She then competed at the European Championships. They won the bronze medal in the group all-around behind Russia and Italy and placed fourth in the 5 hoops final. In the 3 balls + 2 ropes final, they won the gold medal, and they won a team bronze medal with the individual juniors. Then at the Kazan World Challenge Cup, they won the group all-around bronze medal behind Italy and Russia, and they won silver in 5 hoops behind Russia. The same group competed at the World Championships in Sofia where they won the group all-around bronze medal behind Russia and Italy and qualified for the 2020 Olympic Games. They then won the gold medal in the 5 hoops final and placed sixth in 3 balls + 2 ropes. Kiryakova dedicated the group's 5 hoops gold medal to her mother, who had a stroke days before the World Championships began.

=== 2019 ===
Kiryakova competed with the same 2018 group during the 2019 season. They won the gold medal in the 3 hoops + 4 clubs final and the silver medal in the group all-around at the Pesaro World Cup. Then at the Sofia World Cup, they won the group all-around gold medal. She represented Bulgaria at the 2019 European Games where the Bulgarian group won silver in the group all-around by only 0.050 behind Belarus. They also won the silver medal in the 5 balls final, this time behind Russia. In the 3 hoops + 4 clubs final, they won the bronze medal behind Belarus and Ukraine. She then competed at the World Championships in Baku where the Bulgarian group won the bronze medal in the group all-around behind Russia and Japan. They then won the silver medal behind Japan in the 5 balls final, and they placed fifth in the 3 hoops + 4 clubs final.

=== 2021 ===
The Bulgarian team began their year at the Sofia World Cup, where the team won gold in the group all-around and in both apparatus finals. They once again swept the gold medals at the Baku World Cup. She then competed at the European Championships in Varna, Bulgaria. The Bulgarian team of the senior group, Boryana Kaleyn, and Katrin Taseva finished in fourth place. The Bulgarian group finished fifth in the all-around, but they won gold in the 5 balls final and won silver in the 3 hoops + 4 clubs final behind Israel.

Kiryakova was selected to represent Bulgaria at the 2020 Summer Olympics alongside Laura Traets, Simona Dyankova, Madlen Radukanova, and Erika Zafirova. In the qualification round, the group qualified in first place after receiving the highest scores for both of their routines. In the group all-around final, they once again received the highest scores for both routines and won the gold medal with a total score of 92.100, 1.400 points ahead of Russia. This marked the first time a non-Russian team won the Olympic gold medal in the group all-around since Spain won in 1996, and it was the first time Bulgaria won the Olympic group all-around competition. The Bulgarian group withdrew from the World Championships in Kitakyushu, Japan, four days before the start of the competition, after an injury to Traets.

== Detailed Olympic results ==
Year	Competition Description	Location	Music	Apparatus	Rank	Score-Final	Rank	Score-Qualifying
2020	Olympics	Tokyo		All-around	1st	92.100	1st	91.800
2020	Olympics	Tokyo	Water, Cosmos, Earth by Elica Todorova, Stoyan Yankoulov, Miroslav Ivanov	5 Balls	1st	47.550	1st	47.500
2020	Olympics	Tokyo	Spartacus, ballet in 3 acts, op.8 by Aram Khachaturian, Bolshoi Theatre	3 Hoops + 4 Clubs	1st	44.550	1st	44.300
