= Erika Zafirova =

Bulgarian rhythmic gymnast

- Ерика Зафирова
- Full name: Erika Rosenova Zafirova
- Nicknames: Erche, Eri
- Born: 7 May 1999 (age 27) Kyustendil, Bulgaria
- Height: 168 cm (5 ft 6 in)

Gymnastics career
- Discipline: Rhythmic gymnastics
- Country represented: Bulgaria (2012 - 2021)
- Club: Olympia 74
- Head coach: Vesela Dimitrova
- Assistant coach: Mihaela Maevska
- Former coach: Sonya Monukova
- Choreographer: Margarita Budinova
Medal record
Rhythmic Gymnastics
Representing Bulgaria
Olympic Games
Gold medal – first place	2020 Tokyo	Group All-around
World Championships
Silver medal – second place	2019 Baku	5 Balls
Bronze medal – third place	2019 Baku	Group All-around
European Games
Silver medal – second place	2019 Minsk	Group All-around
Silver medal – second place	2019 Minsk	5 Balls
Bronze medal – third place	2019 Minsk	3 Hoops and 4 Clubs
European Championships
Gold medal – first place	2021 Varna	5 Balls
Silver medal – second place	2021 Varna	3 Hoops + 4 Clubs

Erika Rosenova Zafirova (Bulgarian: Ерика Росенова Зафирова; born 7 May 1999) is a Bulgarian rhythmic gymnast. She is the 2020 Olympic group all-around champion. She is the 2019 World group all-around bronze medalist and 5 balls silver medalist. She is the 2021 European 5 balls champion and 3 hoops + 4 clubs silver medalist. She won two silver medals and one bronze medal at the 2019 European Games.

== Personal life ==
Zafirova was engaged to David Huddleston, a Bulgarian artistic gymnast who also competed at the 2020 Summer Olympics. Couple split up in 2023.

Her current partner is a former Bulgarian wrestler, Tsvetan Draganov. In March 2025, she gave birth to a baby girl, Anna.

== Career ==
Zafirova began rhythmic gymnastics when she was seven years old.

=== Individual ===
Zafirova competed at the 2014 Junior European Championships with Boryana Kaleyn and Katerina Marinova, and they finished fourth in the team competition.

In the 2016 season, Zafirova became age eligible for senior competition. At the Moscow International Tournament, she finished eighth in the all-around. She then finished sixth in the all-around at the Corbeil Essonnes Cup.

Zafirova competed in her first World Challenge Cup at the 2017 Portimao World Cup where she finished sixth in the all-around and ball and fifth in the hoop. She won a silver medal in the ribbon behind Israeli gymnast Victoria Veinberg Filanovsky.

=== Group ===
==== 2019 ====
In 2019, Zafirova joined Bulgarian senior group with Stefani Kiryakova, Madlen Radukanova, Laura Traets, and Simona Dyankova, replacing the injured Elena Bineva. The group won the gold medal in the 3 hoops + 4 clubs final and the silver medal in the group all-around at the Pesaro World Cup. Then at the Sofia World Cup, they won the group all-around gold medal. She represented Bulgaria at the 2019 European Games where the Bulgarian group won silver in the group all-around by only 0.050 behind Belarus. They also won the silver medal in the 5 balls final, this time behind Russia. In the 3 hoops + 4 clubs final, they won the bronze medal behind Belarus and Ukraine. She then competed at the World Championships in Baku where the Bulgarian group won the bronze medal in the group all-around behind Russia and Japan. They then won the silver medal behind Japan in the 5 balls final, and they placed fifth in the 3 hoops + 4 clubs final.

==== 2021 ====
The Bulgarian team began their year at the Sofia World Cup, where the team won gold in the group all-around and in both apparatus finals. They once again swept the gold medals at the Baku World Cup. She then competed at the European Championships in Varna, Bulgaria. The Bulgarian team of the senior group, Boryana Kaleyn, and Katrin Taseva finished in fourth place. The Bulgarian group finished fifth in the all-around, but they won gold in the 5 balls final and won silver in the 3 hoops + 4 clubs final behind Israel.

Zafirova was selected to represent Bulgaria at the 2020 Summer Olympics alongside Laura Traets, Stefani Kiryakova, Madlen Radukanova, and Simona Dyankova. In the qualification round, the group qualified in first place after receiving the highest scores for both of their routines. In the group all-around final, they once again received the highest scores for both routines and won the gold medal with a total score of 92.100, 1.400 points ahead of Russia. This marked the first time a non-Russian team won the Olympic gold medal in the group all-around since Spain won in 1996, and it was the first time Bulgaria won the Olympic group all-around competition. The Bulgarian group withdrew from the World Championships in Kitakyushu, Japan, four days before the start of the competition, after an injury to Traets.

== Detailed Olympic results ==
Year	Competition Description	Location	Music	Apparatus	Rank	Score-Final	Rank	Score-Qualifying
2020	Olympics	Tokyo		All-around	1st	92.100	1st	91.800
2020	Olympics	Tokyo	Water, Cosmos, Earth by Elica Todorova, Stoyan Yankoulov, Miroslav Ivanov	5 Balls	1st	47.550	1st	47.500
2020	Olympics	Tokyo	Spartacus, ballet in 3 acts, op.8 by Aram Khachaturian, Bolshoi Theatre	3 Hoops + 4 Clubs	1st	44.550	1st	44.300
