= Bulgaria in the Eurovision Song Contest 2013 =

- Eurovision Song Contest 2013
- Participating broadcaster: Bulgarian National Television (BNT)
- Country: Bulgaria
- Selection process: Artist: Internal selection Song: Selection among Bŭlgarskata pesen v „Evroviziya 2013” songs
- Selection date: Artist: 10 February 2013; Song: 11 March 2013

Competing entry
- Song: "Samo shampioni"
- Artist: Elitsa Todorova and Stoyan Yankulov
- Songwriters: Elitsa Todorova; Kristian Talev

Placement
- Semi-final result: Failed to qualify (12th)

Participation chronology

Bulgaria was represented at the Eurovision Song Contest 2013 with the song "Samo shampioni", written by Elitsa Todorova and Kristian Talev, and performed by Elitsa Todorova and Stoyan Yankoulov. The Bulgarian participating broadcaster, Bulgarian National Television (BNT), announced in February 2013 that it had selected Elitsa Todorova and Stoyan Yankoulov to compete at the contest. The broadcaster organised the national final Bŭlgarskata pesen v „Evroviziya 2013” in order to select the song that Elitsa and Stoyan competed with. Three songs were selected to participate in the national final, held on 3 March 2013, where "Kismet" emerged as the winning song following the combination of votes from a five-member jury panel and a public televote. The song was withdrawn on 11 March 2013 after failing to secure its copyrights with its apparent songwriter Jonatan Tesei and replaced with runner-up "Samo shampioni". Elitsa and Stoyan had represented Bulgaria in 2007 where they placed fifth with the song "Water".

Bulgaria was drawn to compete in the second semi-final of the Eurovision Song Contest which took place on 16 May 2013. Performing during the show in position 7, "Samo shampioni" was not announced among the top 10 entries of the second semi-final and therefore did not qualify to compete in the final. It was later revealed that Bulgaria placed twelfth out of the 17 participating countries in the semi-final with 45 points.

== Background ==
Prior to the 2013 contest, Bulgarian National Television (BNT) had participated in the Eurovision Song Contest representing Bulgaria eight times since its first entry in 2005. It achieved its best result in 2007 with the song "Water" performed by Elitsa Todorova and Stoyan Yankoulov, which placed fifth. To this point, their 2007 entry is also the only Bulgarian entry to have qualified to the Eurovision final; the nation had failed to qualify to the final with their other seven entries. In 2012, "Love Unlimited" by Sofi Marinova failed to qualify to the final.

As part of its duties as participating broadcaster, BNT organises the selection of its entry in the Eurovision Song Contest and broadcasts the event in the country. The broadcaster confirmed its participation in the 2013 contest on 25 September 2012. In the past, BNT had alternated between both internal selections and national finals in order to select its entry. For its 2013 entry, the broadcaster internally selected the artist that would perform several songs during a national final.

== Before Eurovision ==
=== Artist selection ===
On 10 February 2013, BNT announced that a committee had internally selected Elitsa Todorova and Stoyan Yankoulov to represent Bulgaria in Malmö. The committee consisted of BNT 1 producers, which conducted a survey among Bulgarian Eurovision fans resulting in the selection of Elitsa and Stoyan for the competition. Elitsa Todorova and Stoyan Yankulov previously represented Bulgaria in 2007 where they placed fifth with the song "Water". It was also announced that a national final would be organised to select their song.

=== Bŭlgarskata pesen v „Evroviziya 2013” ===
Five songs were submitted by Elitsa Todorova and Stoyan Yankoulov and the three songs selected for the competition by the committee were presented on 17 February 2013 during the BNT 1 programme Nedelya x 3. The national final took place on 3 March 2013 at the BNT studios in Sofia, hosted by Dragomir Draganov and broadcast on BNT 1, BNR and BG Radio as well as online via the broadcaster's website bnt.bg and the official Eurovision Song Contest website eurovision.tv. All three competing songs were performed by Elitsa Todorova and Stoyan Yankoulov and "Kismet" was selected as the winning song by the 50/50 combination of votes awarded by public televoting and a jury panel. The five-person jury consisted of Maria Ganeva, Nelly Rangelova, Yasen Kozev, Nikolay Yanchovichin and Georgi Andreev. "Kismet" and "Samo shampioni" were tied at 10 points each but since "Kismet" received the most votes from the public it was declared the winning song. In addition to the performances of the songs, guest performers were Poli Genova (who represented Bulgaria in 2011) and Heilsarmee (who would represent Switzerland in 2013).

Winner

Final – 3 March 2013
R/O	Song	Songwriter(s)	Jury	Televote	Total	Place
1	"Dzupai, libe boso" (Дзупай, либе, босо) (Note: Featuring Skiller and Jahmmi)	Elitsa Todorova, Tsvetelin Grudanski-Jahmmi	1	1	2	3
2	"Kismet" (Кисмет)	Elitsa Todorova, Bistritsa Babi	3	7	10	1
3	"Samo shampioni" (Само шампиони)	Elitsa Todorova, Kristian Talev	7	3	10	2

=== Song replacement ===
On 11 March, BNT announced that "Kismet" had been withdrawn from the competition after the broadcaster had not been able to secure its copyrights from Jonatan Tesei, one of the apparent songwriters that they were misinformed about. Runner-up of the national final, "Samo shampioni", replaced the song as the Bulgarian entry for the Eurovision Song Contest 2013.

=== Promotion ===
Elitsa Todorova and Stoyan Yankoulov made several appearances across Europe to specifically promote "Samo shampioni" as the Bulgarian Eurovision entry. On 13 April, Elitsa performed during the Eurovision in Concert event which was held at the Melkweg venue in Amsterdam, Netherlands and hosted by Marlayne and Linda Wagenmakers. On the same day, Stoyan performed during concerts held in Brussels, Belgium. On 22 April, Elitsa performed during an event which was organised by OGAE Greece and held at the Gasoline Bar in Athens, Greece.

== At Eurovision ==
According to Eurovision rules, all nations with the exceptions of the host country and the "Big Five" (France, Germany, Italy, Spain and the United Kingdom) are required to qualify from one of two semi-finals in order to compete for the final; the top ten countries from each semi-final progress to the final. The European Broadcasting Union (EBU) split up the competing countries into six different pots based on voting patterns from previous contests, with countries with favourable voting histories put into the same pot. On 17 January 2013, a special allocation draw was held which placed each country into one of the two semi-finals, as well as which half of the show they would perform in. Bulgaria was placed into the second semi-final, to be held on 16 May 2013, and was scheduled to perform in the first half of the show.

Once all the competing songs for the 2013 contest had been released, the running order for the semi-finals was decided by the shows' producers rather than through another draw, so that similar songs were not placed next to each other. Bulgaria was set to perform in position 7, following the entry from Malta and before the entry from Iceland.

The two semi-finals and the final were broadcast in Bulgaria on BNT 1 with commentary by Elena Rosberg and Georgi Kushvaliev. BNT appointed Joanna Dragneva, who represented Bulgaria in 2008 as the lead singer of Deep Zone, as its spokesperson to announce the Bulgarian votes during the final.

=== Semi-final ===
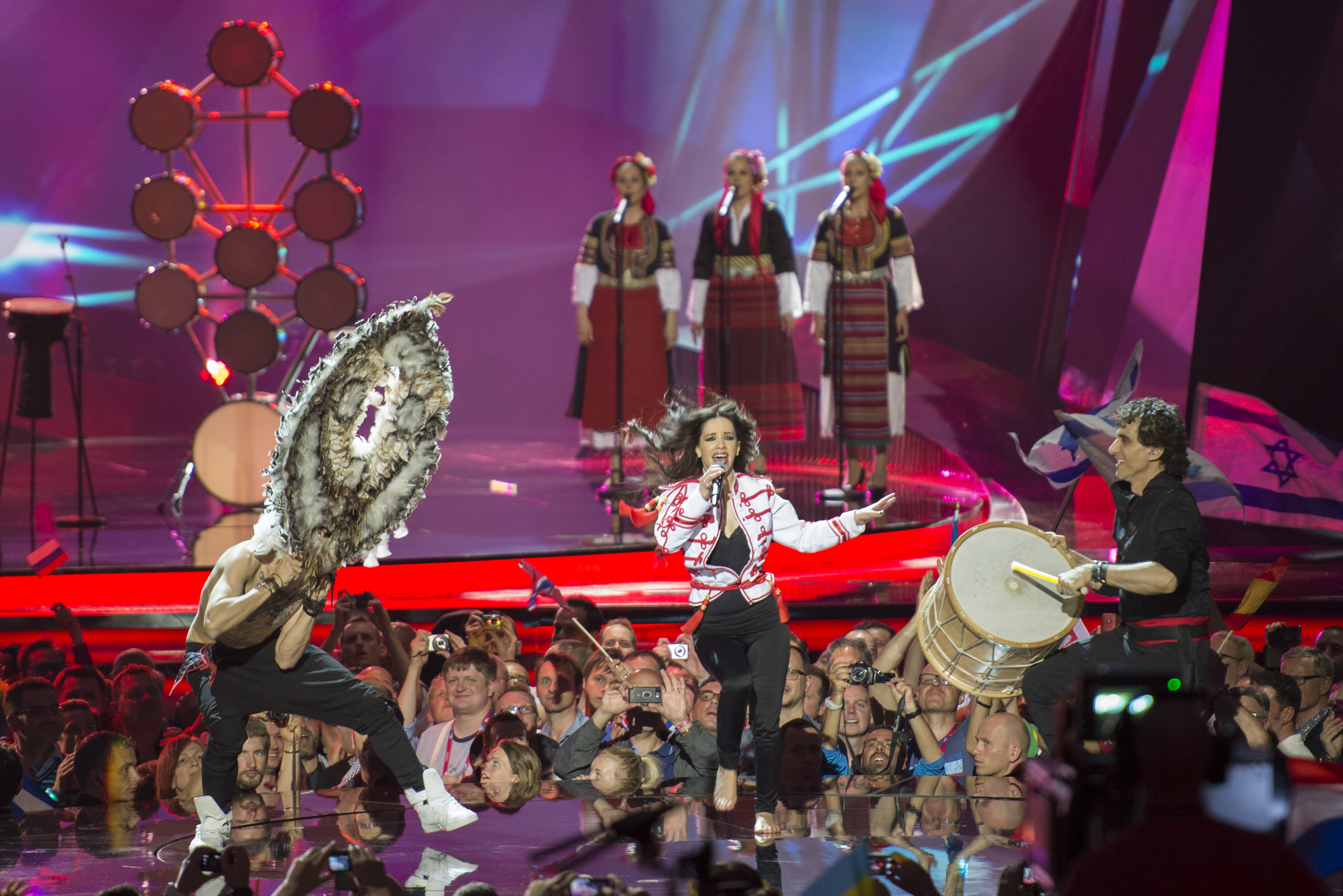
Elitsa Todorova and Stoyan Yankoulov during a rehearsal before the second semi-final

Elitsa Todorova and Stoyan Yankoulov took part in technical rehearsals on 8 and 11 May, followed by dress rehearsals on 15 and 16 May. This included the jury show on 15 May where the professional juries of each country watched and voted on the competing entries.

The Bulgarian performance featured Elitsa Todorova and Stoyan Yankoulov performing a drum routine, joined on stage by a bagpipe player on the right of the stage and three backing vocalists. Elitsa also performed choreography which included kneeling down and throwing her drumsticks which were luminous. Elitsa and Stoyan as well as the bagpiper finished the performance on the stage catwalk with the bagpiper carrying a Western Bulgarian traditional feathered mask. The bagpiper that joined Elitsa Todorova and Stoyan Yankoulov was Venci Venc', while the three backing vocalists were members of the Dragostin Folk National choir: Bilyana Sokolova, Biserka Danova-Pilarska and Desislava Georgieva.

At the end of the show, Bulgaria was not announced among the top 10 entries in the second semi-final and therefore failed to qualify to compete in the final. It was later revealed that Bulgaria placed twelfth in the semi-final, receiving a total of 45 points.

=== Voting ===
Voting during the three shows consisted of 50 percent public televoting and 50 percent from a jury deliberation. The jury consisted of five music industry professionals who were citizens of the country they represent. This jury was asked to judge each contestant based on: vocal capacity; the stage performance; the song's composition and originality; and the overall impression by the act. In addition, no member of a national jury could be related in any way to any of the competing acts in such a way that they cannot vote impartially and independently.

Following the release of the full split voting by the EBU after the conclusion of the competition, it was revealed that Bulgaria had placed sixth ith the public televote and seventeenth (last) with the jury vote in the second semi-final. In the public vote, Bulgaria received an average rank of 7.44, while with the jury vote, Bulgaria received an average rank of 10.75.

Below is a breakdown of points awarded to Bulgaria and awarded by Bulgaria in the second semi-final and grand final of the contest. The nation awarded its 12 points to Azerbaijan in the semi-final and the final of the contest.

==== Points awarded to Bulgaria ====
Points awarded to Bulgaria (Semi-final 2)
Score	Country
12 points	
10 points	Armenia
8 points	San Marino
7 points	
6 points	Spain
5 points	
4 points	Albania; Azerbaijan; Georgia
3 points	Macedonia
2 points	Greece
1 point	France; Hungary; Norway; Romania

==== Points awarded by Bulgaria ====
Points awarded by Bulgaria (Semi-final 2)
Score	Country
12 points	Azerbaijan
10 points	Greece
8 points	Armenia
7 points	Norway
6 points	Hungary
5 points	Macedonia
4 points	Israel
3 points	Georgia
2 points	Romania
1 point	Switzerland

Points awarded by Bulgaria (Final)
Score	Country
12 points	Azerbaijan
10 points	Ukraine
8 points	Armenia
7 points	Greece
6 points	Hungary
5 points	Russia
4 points	Sweden
3 points	Moldova
2 points	Denmark
1 point	Norway
