= Elena Bineva =

Bulgarian group rhythmic gymnast

- Born: 18 September 1999 (age 27) Sofia, Bulgaria
- Height: 175 cm (5 ft 9 in)

Gymnastics career
- Discipline: Rhythmic gymnastics
- Country represented: Bulgaria; (2013–2018)
- Club: Levski
- Gym: Rakovski
- Head coach: Vesela Dimitrova
- Assistant coach: Mihaela Maevska
- Choreographer: Margarita Budinova
Medal record
Representing Bulgaria
Group Rhythmic Gymnastics
World Championships
Gold medal – first place	2018 Sofia	5 Hoops
Silver medal – second place	2017 Pesaro	Group All-around
Bronze medal – third place	2017 Pesaro	3 Balls + 2 Ropes
Bronze medal – third place	2018 Sofia	Group All-around
European Championships
Gold medal – first place	2018 Guadalajara	3 Balls + 2 Ropes
Bronze medal – third place	2018 Guadalajara	Team
Bronze medal – third place	2018 Guadalajara	Group All-around
Youth Olympic Games
Silver medal – second place	2014 Nanjing	Group All-around
Junior European Championships
Bronze medal – third place	2013 Vienna	Group All-around

Elena Slavcheva Bineva (Bulgarian: Елена Славчева Бинева; born 18 September 1999) is a Bulgarian retired group rhythmic gymnast. She is the 2018 European and 2018 World Group 5 Hoops champion, the 2017 World Group All-around silver medalist and the 2014 Youth Olympic Group All-around silver medalist.

== Personal life ==
Eli has 3 sisters (Miroslava, Viki and Martina Bineva) and one brother (Kaloyan Binev), who competes in taekwondo. Her father Slavcho Binev won gold at the 1992 European Championships in taekwondo and became a well-known Bulgarian businessman and politician after the end of his sports career. Her mother is Maria Bineva.

She has been dating an Uzbek, Alan Alanovich since 2020. They met while working together as models in Hong Kong. Alan, born in the ancient Uzbek city of Bukhara and eight years older than Elena, moved to Sofia in 2023, where they opened a bakery offering traditional Uzbek dishes. His real name is Evgeniy, but he uses the pseudonym Alan. They got engaged in January 2025, during a trip to Barcelona. In April 2025, she announced on her Instagram profile that they are expecting a baby girl. On 11 August 2025, she gave birth to a daughter Bella. As of October 2026, the family resides in Barcelona, Spain.

== Career ==
She started rhythmic gymnastics at the age of three in club "Levski Iliana". At the age of six she moved to club "Levski", where her coach was Branimira Markova.

=== Junior ===
Bineva competed with the Bulgarian junior group at the European Championships in Vienna. The group won the all-around bronze medal behind the Russian and Belarusian groups. They then placed fifth in the five hoops final.

She became Vice Olympic Champion of the Youth Olympic Games in Nanjing 2014. Later she became part of the new ensemble with Madlen Radukanova, Simona Dyankova, Laura Traets and Teodora Aleksandrova in 2016, after retirement of the old group members.

=== Senior ===
She was a member of the Bulgarian senior group from 2017 to 2019. In February 2017, she suffered a right ankle injury at an event in Moscow; the trauma was extensible ligaments, swelling in the bone, and a broken piece that was 6 years old on her right leg, and she could not compete at the Rumi, and Albena international tournament in Varna, Bulgaria. In April 2017, she broke a bone in her hand at training when she and one of the other gymnasts hit really badly and bone on her right wrist broke, that is why she performed with linguists at the 2017 World Championships.

She kept competing in 2018 despite those injuries. At the Sofia World Cup, Bineva and the Bulgarian group won gold in the group all-around and in 5 hoops and bronze in 3 balls + 2 ropes. Then at the Baku World Cup they won gold in both apparatus finals but lost the group all-around to Italy. They won another group all-around gold medal at the Guadalajara World Challenge Cup in addition to winning gold in 3 balls + 2 ropes and silver in 5 hoops. She then competed at the European Championships alongside Madlen Radukanova, Simona Dyankova, Laura Traets, and Stefani Kiryakova. They won the bronze medal in the group all-around behind Russia and Italy and placed fourth in the 5 hoops final. In the 3 balls + 2 ropes final, they won the gold medal, and they won a team bronze medal with the individual juniors. Then at the Kazan World Challenge Cup, they won the group all-around bronze medal behind Italy and Russia, and they won silver in 5 hoops. The same group competed at the World Championships in Sofia, Bulgaria, where they won the group all-around bronze medal behind Russia and Italy and qualified for the 2020 Olympic Games. They then also won gold medal in the 5 hoops final and placed sixth in 3 balls + 2 ropes.

In 2019, she decided to retire to keep the cohesion of the Bulgarian group safe a year before the Olympic Games and to avoid the danger of having to train a new gymnast in a terrible rush a few months before Tokyo if her injury was too painful again.
