= 2017 Rhythmic Gymnastics World Championships =

2017 Rhythmic Gymnastics World Championships

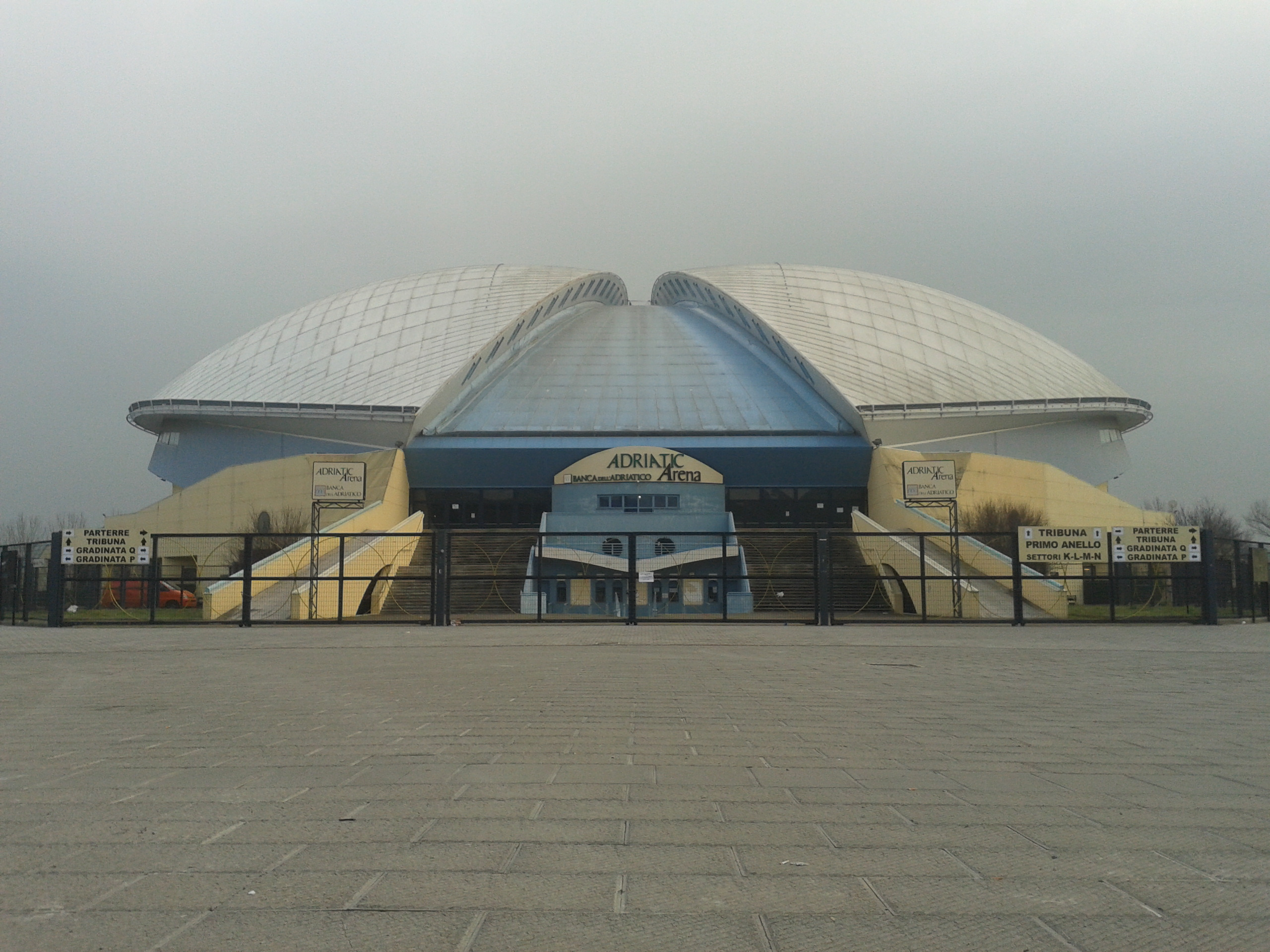
- The Adriatic Arena, where the competition took place
- Venue: Adriatic Arena
- Location: Pesaro, Italy
- Start date: 30 August 2017
- End date: 3 September 2017

The 2017 Rhythmic Gymnastics World Championships, the 35th edition, was held in Pesaro, Italy, from 30 August to 3 September 2017. This was the first time that the World Championships were held in Italy.

Over 250 gymnasts from 53 countries competed. The event ambassador was Olympic champion Alina Kabaeva. This was the first World Championships with an ambassador. A reference jury was used to ensure accuracy and objectivity in scoring.

Every individual gold medal and all but one silver was won by the Russian identical twins Dina Averina and Arina Averina. In the apparatus finals, Dina won gold in hoop and clubs, while Arina won with ball and ribbon. Kaho Minagawa won the first individual World medal for Japan since 1975, a bronze with hoop, and Neviana Vladinova won Bulgaria's first individual medal since 2011 with bronze in ball, which she dedicated to her coach. Belarusian Katsiaryna Halkina was the only other gymnast to win silver, in clubs.

In the all-around, Dina won the gold, with Arina winning silver. Linoy Ashram from Israel won the bronze.

The Russian group won their second consecutive all-around competition. The Bulgarian group, whose members were all competing at their first World Championships, won silver, a result that they expressed surprise and joy about. The Japanese group won the bronze medal, the first time a Japanese group had won an all-around medal since the 1975 World Championships.

In the group apparatus finals, the Russian group won a second gold in the mixed apparatus finals, while the Italian group were the only non-Russians to win gold at the competition in the 5 hoops final; their performance received two standing ovations from the home crowd. The Japanese group won two further medals, silver in the mixed apparatus final and bronze with five hoops.

The Longines Prize for Elegance was awarded to Alexandra Agiurgiuculese. She was the first Italian to receive it.

== Participating countries ==
The following federations sent gymnasts to the Championships:

- Andorra
- Armenia
- Australia
- Austria
- Azerbaijan
- Belarus
- Brazil
- Bulgaria
- Canada
- China
- Cape Verde
- Croatia
- Cyprus
- Czech Republic
- Denmark
- Egypt
- Estonia
- Finland
- France
- Great Britain
- Georgia
- Germany
- Greece
- Hungary
- Israel
- Italy
- Japan
- Kazakhstan
- South Korea
- Latvia
- Lithuania
- Luxembourg
- Mexico
- Norway
- New Zealand
- Poland
- Portugal
- Romania
- Russia
- Slovenia
- South Africa
- San Marino
- Serbia
- Spain
- Sri Lanka
- Slovakia
- Sweden
- Turkey
- Ukraine
- United States
- Uzbekistan

== Medal winners ==
Event	Gold	Silver	Bronze
Individual Finals
Hoop	Dina Averina (RUS)	Arina Averina (RUS)	Kaho Minagawa (JPN)
Ball	Arina Averina (RUS)	Dina Averina (RUS)	Neviana Vladinova (BUL)
Clubs	Dina Averina (RUS)	Katsiaryna Halkina (BLR)	Arina Averina (RUS)
Ribbon	Arina Averina (RUS)	Dina Averina (RUS)	Linoy Ashram (ISR)
All-Around	Dina Averina (RUS)	Arina Averina (RUS)	Linoy Ashram (ISR)
Groups Finals
Group All-Around	Russia; Anastasia Bliznyuk; Maria Kravtsova; Evgeniia Levanova; Ksenia Poliakova; Anastasia Tatareva; Maria Tolkacheva	Bulgaria; Teodora Aleksandrova; Elena Bineva; Simona Dyankova; Madlen Radukanova; Laura Traets	Japan; Mao Kunii; Rie Matsubara; Sayuri Sugimoto; Ayuka Suzuki; Nanami Takenaka; Kiko Yokota
5 Hoops	Italy; Anna Basta*; Martina Centofanti; Agnese Duranti; Alessia Maurelli; Martina Santandrea; Beatrice Tornatore	Russia; Anastasia Bliznyuk; Maria Kravtsova; Evgeniia Levanova*; Ksenia Poliakova; Anastasia Tatareva; Maria Tolkacheva	Japan; Mao Kunii; Rie Matsubara; Sayuri Sugimoto; Ayuka Suzuki; Nanami Takenaka; Kiko Yokota*
3 Balls + 2 Ropes	Russia; Anastasia Bliznyuk; Maria Kravtsova; Evgeniia Levanova; Ksenia Poliakova*; Anastasia Tatareva; Maria Tolkacheva	Japan; Mao Kunii*; Rie Matsubara; Sayuri Sugimoto; Ayuka Suzuki; Nanami Takenaka; Kiko Yokota	Bulgaria; Teodora Aleksandrova; Elena Bineva; Simona Dyankova; Madlen Radukanova; Laura Traets

* reserve gymnast

== Individual ==
=== Individual Qualification ===
The top eight scores for each individual apparatus qualified to the apparatus finals. The top 24 in overall qualification scores advanced to the all-around final.

Rank	Gymnast	Nation	Hoop (rhythmic gymnastics)	Ball (rhythmic gymnastics)	Clubs (rhythmic gymnastics)	Ribbon (rhythmic gymnastics)	Total
1	Dina Averina	Russia	18.950 (1)	18.850 (1)	19.200 (1)	17.775 (1)	74.775
2	Arina Averina	Russia	18.350 (3)	18.575 (2)	18.875 (2)	17.750 (2)	73.550
3	Linoy Ashram	Israel	18.600 (2)	17.750 (3)	16.400	16.800 (3)	69.550
4	Neviana Vladinova	Bulgaria	17.100 (6)	17.500 (4)	17.900 (3)	15.500	68.000
5	Katsiaryna Halkina	Belarus	17.250 (5)	17.350 (5)	17.650 (4)	15.400	67.650
6	Laura Zeng	United States	16.950	17.000 (6)	17.000 (7)	16.250 (5)	67.200
7	Alexandra Agiurgiuculese	Italy	15.600	16.950 (7)	17.000 (6)	16.500 (4)	66.050
8	Katrin Taseva	Bulgaria	16.200	16.700	16.900	15.700 (7)	65.500
9	Kaho Minagawa	Japan	17.100 (7)	16.900 (8)	15.750	15.300	65.050
10	Alina Harnasko	Belarus	16.650	16.250	16.950	15.100	64.950
11	Evita Griskenas	United States	17.300 (4)	16.250	15.150	15.650 (8)	64.350
12	Milena Baldassarri	Italy	14.950	15.800	16.350	16.100 (6)	63.200
13	Eleni Kelaiditi	Greece	15.400	16.100	16.450	15.250	63.200
14	Viktoria Mazur	Ukraine	16.500	16.050	15.700	14.100	62.350
15	Olena Diachenko	Ukraine	15.900	16.250	15.800	13.300	61.250
16	Anastasiya Serdyukova	Uzbekistan	14.950	15.800	15.650	14.500	60.900
17	Zhao Yating	China	15.050	14.800	15.200	15.150	60.200
18	Sabina Ashirbayeva	Kazakhstan	16.050	14.600	15.250	14.250	60.150
19	Salome Pazhava	Georgia	16.400	12.950	17.200 (5)	13.350	59.900
20	Ana Luiza Filiorianu	Romania	14.650	13.750	16.250	14.500	59.150
21	Sumire Kita	Japan	17.000 (8)	14.600	13.350	14.000	58.950
22	Sabina Tashkenbaeva	Uzbekistan	14.150	15.200	15.650	13.750	58.750
23	Elina Valieva	Georgia	15.700	12.950	16.300	13.700	58.650
24	Nicol Ruprecht	Austria	14.775	15.400	14.150	14.000	58.325
25	Nicol Voronkov	Israel	13.450	15.700	14.350	14.800	58.300
26	Ayshan Bayramova	Azerbaijan	15.150	14.050	15.450	13.600	58.250
27	Zohra Aghamirova	Azerbaijan	15.250	15.250	14.600	13.900	57.800
28	Alina Adilkhanova	Kazakhstan	14.750	14.450	15.650	12.500	57.350
29	Shang Rong	China	15.200	15.850	13.800	12.100	56.950
30	Axelle Jovenin	France	13.450	14.600	14.550	13.750	56.350
31	Kim Chaewoon	South Korea	14.850	13.600	14.800	13.000	56.250
32	Fanni Pigniczki	Hungary	14.600	14.600	13.400	13.350	55.950
33	Andreea Verdes	Romania	13.950	14.150	14.900	12.850	55.850
34	Polina Berezina	Spain	13.550	14.400	14.100	13.400	55.450
35	Natália Gaudio	Brazil	13.550	13.700	14.550	13.250	55.050
36	Iasmina Agagulian	Armenia	15.050	13.650	13.400	12.800	54.900
37	Alexandra Kis	Hungary	14.450	13.600	13.700	13.050	54.800
38	Natalia Koziol	Poland	13.200	14.100	14.550	12.150	54.000
39	Lea Tkaltschewitsch	Germany	13.300	13.000	13.850	13.700	53.850
40	Sara Llana	Spain	14.350	13.650	12.250	13.400	53.650
41	Carmen Whelan	Canada	13.450	12.900	14.450	12.850	53.650
42	Diamanto Evripidou	Cyprus	14.250	13.000	13.050	13.300	53.600
43	Jouki Tikkanen	Finland	12.550	14.450	13.500	13.000	53.500
44	Aleksandra Podgoršek	Slovenia	12.750	13.800	13.950	12.700	53.200
45	Rebecca Gergalo	Finland	14.250	12.850	12.500	12.750	52.350
46	Eunseo Park	South Korea	13.750	13.250	12.750	12.550	52.300
47	Laurabell Kabrits	Estonia	13.350	12.750	13.400	12.450	51.950
48	Ecem Cankaya	Turkey	12.750	14.400	10.700	13.850	51.700
49	Marina Malpica	Mexico	13.850	13.050	11.750	13.000	51.650
50	Karla Diaz	Mexico	11.900	13.650	11.800	14.000	51.350
51	Tara Wilkie	Australia	13.050	13.750	12.550	12.000	51.350
52	Natalia Kulig	Poland	13.000	11.950	14.150	11.650	50.850
53	Danielle Prince	Australia	13.100	12.600	12.700	12.200	50.600
54	Grace Legote	South Africa	10.200	13.500	13.000	13.750	50.450
55	Tania Domingues	Portugal	12.950	13.100	12.650	11.600	50.300
56	Veronika Proncenko	Lithuania	13.000	13.750	11.750	11.300	49.800
57	Katherine Uchida	Canada	12.900	12.600	11.450	12.750	49.600
58	Laura Sales	Portugal	12.000	12.450	13.400	11.300	49.150
59	Olga Bogdanova	Estonia	11.700	12.100	13.900	11.250	48.950
60	Emilie Holte	Norway	11.850	11.850	13.250	11.700	48.650
61	Eleni Erimoude	Cyprus	13.300	12.850	12.300	10.050	48.500
62	Natasija Govozdic	Serbia	12.250	12.250	13.400	10.450	48.350
63	Daniela Nemeckova	Czech Republic	13.800	11.600	11.800	10.950	48.150
64	Aja Jerman Bukavec	Slovenia	11.500	11.900	12.300	12.350	48.050
65	Karine Walter	Brazil	10.100	12.850	13.250	11.725	47.925
66	Emelie Swensen	Norway	12.000	10.800	13.300	11.600	47.700
67	Laura Halford	Great Britain	14.500	9.100	12.350	11.450	47.400
68	Noemi Peschel	Germany	10.650	13.300	13.150	9.900	47.000
69	Denisa Stepankova	Czech Republic	12.650	11.450	12.450	10.400	46.950
70	Petra Ribaric	Croatia	12.200	10.850	13.500	10.350	46.900
71	Karoline Mizune	Latvia	10.750	12.050	11.350	11.750	45.900
72	Nourhal Khattab	Egypt	11.400	11.750	11.650	10.400	45.200
73	Elisabeth Vera Rositsan	Lithuania	11.950	11.450	11.450	10.300	45.150
74	Ella Astvatsaryan	Armenia	11.650	11.450	12.150	9.350	44.600
75	Anna-Marie Ondaatje	Sri Lanka	10.250	11.150	11.700	9.300	42.400
76	Malak Hussein	Egypt	10.900	11.000	10.150	10.200	42.250
77	Petra Lindgren	Sweden	11.350	9.300	10.700	10.850	42.200
78	Laura Bozic	Croatia	9.700	11.250	9.950	9.650	40.550
79	Lucia Castiglioni	San Marino	11.150	9.400	9.300	8.600	38.450
80	Andrea Ramos	Andorra	9.900	8.900	10.350	9.050	38.200
81	Aya Tanaka Probert	New Zealand	9.700	7.500	9.650	10.200	37.050
82	Alexandra Chechova	Slovakia	5.950	10.250	11.100	8.500	35.800
83	Anastasia Ponomarenko	Sweden	9.250	9.975	9.100	7.325	35.650
84	Emma Erangey	Denmark	9.150	8.450	9.750	8.250	35.600
85	Jessica Pereira	Andorra	8.300	10.450	8.950	7.400	35.100
86	Grace Schroder	New Zealand	9.500	9.950	9.900	5.700	35.050
87	Elena Smirnova	Luxembourg	9.350	8.650	9.150	7.500	34.700
88	Chris-Marie Van Wyk	South Africa	8.650	9.450	9.500	6.850	34.450
89	Nicoline Sachmann	Denmark	8.550	9.350	7.375	8.450	33.725
90	Marcia Lopes Alves	Cape Verde	5.500	7.600	8.750	8.350	30.200

=== Hoop ===
Rank	Gymnast	Nation	D Score	E Score	Pen.	Total
1st place, gold medalist(s)	Dina Averina	Russia	10.000	9.100		19.100
2nd place, silver medalist(s)	Arina Averina	Russia	9.900	9.100		19.000
3rd place, bronze medalist(s)	Kaho Minagawa	Japan	8.900	8.800		17.700
4	Katsiaryna Halkina	Belarus	8.800	8.800		17.600
5	Neviana Vladinova	Bulgaria	8.800	8.750		17.550
6	Linoy Ashram	Israel	9.000	8.200	–0.30	16.900
7	Sumire Kita	Japan	8.200	8.450		16.650
8	Evita Griskenas	United States	8.000	7.750		15.750

=== Ball ===
Rank	Gymnast	Nation	D Score	E Score	Pen.	Total
1st place, gold medalist(s)	Arina Averina	Russia	9.700	9.250		18.950
2nd place, silver medalist(s)	Dina Averina	Russia	9.700	9.000		18.700
3rd place, bronze medalist(s)	Neviana Vladinova	Bulgaria	9.100	8.850		17.950
4	Linoy Ashram	Israel	9.200	8.725		17.925
5	Katsiaryna Halkina	Belarus	8.900	8.900		17.800
6	Laura Zeng	United States	8.500	8.550		17.050
7	Alexandra Agiurgiuculese	Italy	8.300	8.750	-0.05	17.000
8	Kaho Minagawa	Japan	8.000	8.300		16.300

=== Clubs ===
Rank	Gymnast	Nation	D Score	E Score	Pen.	Total
1st place, gold medalist(s)	Dina Averina	Russia	10.000	9.000		19.000
2nd place, silver medalist(s)	Katsiaryna Halkina	Belarus	9.100	8.950		18.050
3rd place, bronze medalist(s)	Arina Averina	Russia	8.900	8.900		17.800
4	Neviana Vladinova	Bulgaria	8.700	8.650		17.350
5	Alexandra Agiurgiuculese	Italy	8.600	8.650		17.250
6	Laura Zeng	United States	8.600	8.450		17.050
7	Alina Harnasko	Belarus	7.300	8.250		15.550
8	Salome Pazhava	Georgia	7.600	7.700		15.300

=== Ribbon ===
Rank	Gymnast	Nation	D Score	E Score	Pen.	Total
1st place, gold medalist(s)	Arina Averina	Russia	9.200	9.100		18.300
2nd place, silver medalist(s)	Dina Averina	Russia	8.500	8.700		17.200
3rd place, bronze medalist(s)	Linoy Ashram	Israel	8.000	8.650		16.650
4	Alexandra Agiurgiuculese	Italy	7.700	8.550		16.250
5	Laura Zeng	United States	7.600	8.600		16.200
6	Milena Baldassarri	Italy	7.600	8.450		16.050
7	Evita Griskenas	United States	6.600	7.900		14.500
8	Katrin Taseva	Bulgaria	6.300	7.700	-0.30	13.700

=== All-Around ===
Rank	Gymnast	Nation	Hoop (rhythmic gymnastics)	Ball (rhythmic gymnastics)	Clubs (rhythmic gymnastics)	Ribbon (rhythmic gymnastics)	Total
1st place, gold medalist(s)	Dina Averina	Russia	18.850	18.550	18.850	18.450	74.700
2nd place, silver medalist(s)	Arina Averina	Russia	18.150	18.500	18.550	18.250	73.450
3rd place, bronze medalist(s)	Linoy Ashram	Israel	18.375	17.400	17.150	17.100	70.025
4	Katsiaryna Halkina	Belarus	17.700	16.100	18.200	17.000	69.000
5	Kaho Minagawa	Japan	17.500	16.950	17.950	16.025	68.425
6	Laura Zeng	United States	17.100	17.050	17.700	16.400	68.250
7	Neviana Vladinova	Bulgaria	18.200	16.400	16.500	16.450	67.550
8	Alexandra Agiurgiuculese	Italy	17.600	17.800	16.700	15.350	67.450
9	Milena Baldassarri	Italy	17.425	15.500	17.000	16.550	66.475
10	Katrin Taseva	Bulgaria	16.950	17.100	16.550	15.800	66.400
11	Evita Griskenas	United States	17.000	16.150	16.400	15.800	65.350
12	Sumire Kita	Japan	16.300	15.300	15.550	15.550	62.700
13	Alina Harnasko	Belarus	17.000	15.800	15.600	14.250	62.650
14	Ana Luiza Filiorianu	Romania	16.150	15.525	16.150	14.800	62.625
15	Salome Pazhava	Georgia	15.750	15.350	16.300	13.900	61.300
16	Sabina Ashirbayeva	Kazakhstan	15.900	15.850	14.500	14.550	60.800
17	Viktoria Mazur	Ukraine	15.800	15.700	15.350	13.800	60.650
18	Anastasiya Serdyukova	Uzbekistan	14.700	15.000	15.700	14.175	59.575
19	Olena Diachenko	Ukraine	15.750	13.700	16.250	13.450	59.150
20	Eleni Kelaiditi	Greece	14.200	15.600	14.650	14.050	58.500
21	Zhao Yating	China	15.350	13.600	14.525	14.350	57.825
22	Sabina Tashkenbaeva	Uzbekistan	15.050	14.050	14.150	13.250	56.500
23	Nicol Ruprecht	Austria	14.900	13.500	14.100	13.100	55.600
24	Elina Valieva	Georgia	15.000	12.650	14.350	11.300	53.300

== Groups ==
=== Group All-Around ===
The top 8 scores in each apparatus combination qualified to the group apparatus finals, and the top 8 in overall qualification scores advanced to the group all-around final.

Place	Nation	5	2 + 3	Total
1st place, gold medalist(s)	Russia	18.950 (1)	18.750 (1)	37.700
2nd place, silver medalist(s)	Bulgaria	18.650 (3)	18.300 (3)	36.950
3rd place, bronze medalist(s)	Japan	18.400 (4)	18.250 (4)	36.650
4	Italy	18.700 (2)	17.925 (6)	36.625
5	Belarus	18.050 (5)	18.375 (2)	36.425
6	Ukraine	17.450 (7)	18.150 (5)	35.600
7	Azerbaijan	18.000 (6)	17.450 (7)	35.450
8	China	17.300 (8)	16.950 (8)	34.250
9	France	16.450	16.600	33.050
10	Uzbekistan	16.725	15.800	32.525
11	Finland	16.800	15.550	32.350
12	United States	16.050	16.200	32.250
13	Brazil	16.050	15.650	31.700
14	Germany	16.550	14.650	31.200
15	Spain	14.500	16.150	30.650
16	Greece	15.150	14.850	30.000
17	Hungary	15.800	13.200	29.000
18	Poland	15.500	13.350	28.850
19	Latvia	15.500	12.800	28.300
20	Mexico	14.100	14.050	28.150
21	Canada	13.750	14.250	28.000
22	Kazakhstan	14.350	13.150	27.500
23	South Korea	14.450	12.550	27.000
24	Slovenia	13.500	13.100	26.600
25	Switzerland	14.050	11.950	26.000
26	Estonia	12.100	9.850	21.950
27	Egypt	9.300	12.000	21.300
28	Norway	11.100	10.050	21.150
29	Singapore	11.450	9.300	20.750

=== 5 Hoops ===
Rank	Nation	E Score	D Score	Pen.	Total
1st place, gold medalist(s)	Italy	8.900	10.000		18.900
2nd place, silver medalist(s)	Russia	8.700	10.000		18.700
3rd place, bronze medalist(s)	Japan	8.600	10.000		18.600
4	Bulgaria	8.550	9.700		18.250
5	Belarus	8.425	9.600		18.025
6	Azerbaijan	8.250	9.600		17.850
7	China	8.050	9.300		17.350
8	Ukraine	7.650	9.500		17.350

=== 3 Balls + 2 Ropes ===
Rank	Nation	E Score	D Score	Pen.	Total
1st place, gold medalist(s)	Russia	8.900	10.000		18.900
2nd place, silver medalist(s)	Japan	8.650	10.000		18.650
3rd place, bronze medalist(s)	Bulgaria	8.800	9.800		18.600
4	Italy	8.550	10.000		18.550
5	Belarus	8.500	9.500		18.000
6	Ukraine	8.200	9.300		17.500
7	Azerbaijan	8.100	9.000		17.100
8	China	7.675	9.000		16.675

== Medal table ==
Rank	Nation	Gold	Silver	Bronze	Total
1	Russia	7	5	1	13
2	Italy	1	0	0	1
3	Japan	0	1	3	4
4	Bulgaria	0	1	2	3
5	Belarus	0	1	0	1
6	Israel	0	0	2	2
Totals (6 entries)		8	8	8	24
