= Rebecca Gergalo =

Finnish rhythmic gymnast

- Nickname: Rebe
- Born: 16 March 2000 (age 26) Helsinki, Finland

Gymnastics career
- Discipline: Rhythmic gymnastics
- Country represented: Finland (2016)
- Club: Olarin Voimistelijat, Elise
- Gym: Ikuri Sports Hall
- Head coaches: Larisa Gryadunova, Laura Ahonen
- Choreographer: Elena Karpushenko, Irina Zenovka
- Retired: 2021

Rebecca Gergalo (born 16 March 2000) is a Finnish individual rhythmic gymnast.

== Early life and career ==
Gergalo was born to a Russian mother and Ukrainian father, and she speaks Russian. She began training rhythmic gymnastics at the age of 4.

=== 2016 ===
She made her World Cup debut on February 26-28 at World Cup Espoo. She then competed at three more World Cups that year - Berlin, Baku and Kazan.

=== 2017 ===
After the retirement of Ekaterina Volkova, she got her spot in National team and continued competing at World Cup competitions. She competed at the 2017 European Championships in Budapest, Hungary, her first one. Rebecca competed with all four apparatus, finishing on 20th place with ribbon was her best result. Together with teammate Jouki Tikkanen and junior group, they took 11th place in Team competition. On August 30-September 3 she competed at the 2017 World Championships in Pesaro, Italy. This was her first World Championships. She finished on 45th place in All-around Qualifications (52.350).

=== 2018 ===
She is the 2018 Finnish National All-Around champion and the 2018 Nordic All-Around champion. After competing at several World Cup tournaments, she placed 14th in All-around at 2017 World Challenge Cup Guadalajara, Spain, which was her best result so far. In September, she competed at the 2018 World Championships in Sofia, Bulgaria, ending on 34th place in All-around Qualifications (47.725) and 19th in Team competition.

=== 2019 ===
In 2019, she became Finnish National All-around champion once again. On July 3-7, she competed at the 2019 Summer Universiade in Naples, Italy. She ended on 15th place, and did not advance in Apparatus finals.
