= Bulgaria at the 2020 Summer Olympics =

- IOC code: BUL
- NOC: Bulgarian Olympic Committee
- Website: www.bgolympic.org (in Bulgarian and English)

in Tokyo, Japan July 23, 2021 – August 8, 2021
- Competitors: 42 in 12 sports
- Flag bearers (opening): Maria Grozdeva; Josif Miladinov
- Flag bearer (closing): Simona Dyankova
- Medals Ranked 30th: Gold 3 Silver 1 Bronze 2 Total 6

Summer Olympics appearances (overview)
- 1896; 1900–1920; 1924; 1928; 1932; 1936; 1948; 1952; 1956; 1960; 1964; 1968; 1972; 1976; 1980; 1984; 1988; 1992; 1996; 2000; 2004; 2008; 2012; 2016; 2020; 2024

Bulgaria competed at the 2020 Summer Olympics in Tokyo. Originally scheduled to take place from 24 July to 9 August 2020, the Games were postponed to 23 July to 8 August 2021, due to the COVID-19 pandemic. Bulgarian athletes have appeared in every edition of the Summer Olympics since 1924, except for three occasions: the 1948 Summer Olympics in London, and the 1932 and 1984 Summer Olympics in Los Angeles because of Bulgaria's actions in World War II and the worldwide Great Depression and Soviet boycott, respectively.

Bulgaria won six medals, with three of them gold, its best result since 2004 in terms of total medals and since 2000 in terms of gold medals. This was the first time since 2008 that Bulgaria had won any gold medals. All 6 medals were won by female athletes.

== Medalists ==
Medal	Name	Sport	Event	Date
Gold	Ivet Goranova	Karate	Women's 55 kg	5 August
Gold	Stoyka Krasteva	Boxing	Women's flyweight	7 August
Gold	Simona Dyankova; Stefani Kiryakova; Madlen Radukanova; Laura Traets; Erika Zafirova	Gymnastics	Women's rhythmic group all-around	8 August
Silver	Antoaneta Kostadinova	Shooting	Women's 10 m air pistol	25 July
Bronze	Taybe Yusein	Wrestling	Women's freestyle 62 kg	4 August
Bronze	Evelina Nikolova	Wrestling	Women's freestyle 57 kg	5 August

== Competitors ==
The following is the list of number of competitors in the Games.

Sport	Men	Women	Total
Athletics	1	4	5
Badminton	0	3	3
Boxing	1	2	3
Canoeing	0	1	1
Gymnastics	1	7	8
Judo	2	1	3
Karate	0	1	1
Shooting	0	3	3
Swimming	4	1	5
Table tennis	0	1	1
Weightlifting	2	0	2
Wrestling	3	4	7
Total	14	28	42

== Athletics ==
Bulgarian athletes further achieved the entry standards, either by qualifying time or by world ranking, in the following track and field events (up to a maximum of 3 athletes in each event):

Key

- Note–Ranks given for track events are within the athlete's heat only
- Q = Qualified for the next round
- q = Qualified for the next round as a fastest loser or, in field events, by position without achieving the qualifying target
- NR = National record
- N/A = Round not applicable for the event
- Bye = Athlete not required to compete in round

Track & road events

Athlete	Event	Heat		Semifinal		Final	
Athlete	Event	Result	Rank	Result	Rank	Result	Rank
Inna Eftimova	Women's 100 m	11.46	6	Did not advance			
Inna Eftimova	Women's 200 m	23.42	5	Did not advance			
Ivet Lalova-Collio	Women's 200 m	23.39	5	Did not advance			

Field events

Athlete	Event	Qualification		Final	
Athlete	Event	Distance	Position	Distance	Position
Tihomir Ivanov	Men's high jump	2.17	26	Did not advance	
Gabriela Petrova	Women's triple jump	13.79	22	Did not advance	
Mirela Demireva	Women's high jump	1.95	14 Q	1.93	12

== Badminton ==
Bulgaria entered three female badminton players for each of the following events into the Olympic tournament. Rio 2016 Olympian Linda Zechiri was selected among the top 39 individual shuttlers in the women's singles, while sisters Gabriela and Stefani Stoeva secured the women's doubles spot by finishing eighth in the BWF Race to Tokyo Rankings of 15 June 2021.

Athlete	Event	Group stage				Elimination	Quarterfinal	Semifinal	Final / BM	
Athlete	Event	Opposition Score	Opposition Score	Opposition Score	Rank	Opposition Score	Opposition Score	Opposition Score	Opposition Score	Rank
Linda Zechiri	Women's singles	Chen (AUS); L (16–21, 22–20, 8–21)	Blichfeldt (DEN); L (10–21, 3–21)	—N/a	3	Did not advance				
Gabriela Stoeva; Stefani Stoeva	Women's doubles	Kim S-y / Kong H-y (KOR); L (23–21, 12–21, 21–23)	Chen Qc / Jia Yf (CHN); L (18–21, 15–21)	Kititharakul / Prajongjai (THA); W (21–11, 16–21, 21–17)	3	Did not advance				

== Boxing ==
Bulgaria entered one male boxer into the Olympic tournament. Rio 2016 Olympian Daniel Asenov topped the list of eligible boxers from Europe in the men's flyweight division to secure his place on the Bulgarian team based on the IOC's Boxing Task Force Rankings. Stoyka Krasteva secured her spot by scoring a quarterfinal victory at the 2020 European Qualification Tournament in London, United Kingdom.

Athlete	Event	Round of 32	Round of 16	Quarterfinals	Semifinals	Final	
Athlete	Event	Opposition Result	Opposition Result	Opposition Result	Opposition Result	Opposition Result	Rank
Daniel Asenov	Men's flyweight	Girleanu (ROU); W 5–0	Escobar (ESP); L 1–4	Did not advance			
Stoyka Krasteva	Women's flyweight	Nguyễn (VIE); W 3–2	Fuchs (USA); W 5–0	Chang Y (CHN); W 4–1	Namiki (JPN); W 5–0	Çakıroğlu (TUR); W 5–0	1st place, gold medalist(s)
Stanimira Petrova	Women's featherweight	Bye	Arias (COL); L 2–3	Did not advance			

== Canoeing ==
=== Sprint ===
With the cancellation of the 2021 Pan American Championships and the lack of eligible competitors available from the Americas in the canoe sprint regatta, Bulgaria accepted the invitation from the International Canoe Federation to send a canoeist in the inaugural women's C-1 200 m to the Games based on the results at the 2019 ICF Canoe Sprint World Championships in Szeged, Hungary.

Athlete	Event	Heats		Quarterfinals		Semifinals		Final	
Athlete	Event	Time	Rank	Time	Rank	Time	Rank	Time	Rank
Staniliya Stamenova	Women's C-1 200 m	48.477	4 QF	48.939	5	Did not advance			

Qualification Legend: FA = Qualify to final (medal); FB = Qualify to final B (non-medal)

== Gymnastics ==
=== Artistic ===
Bulgaria entered one artistic gymnast into the Olympic competition. David Huddleston booked a spot in the men's individual all-around and apparatus events, by finishing tenth out of the twelve gymnasts eligible for qualification at the 2019 World Championships in Stuttgart, Germany.

Men

Athlete	Event	Qualification								Final							
Athlete	Event	Apparatus						Total	Rank	Apparatus						Total	Rank
Athlete	Event	F	PH	R	V	PB	HB	Total	Rank	F	PH	R	V	PB	HB	Total	Rank
David Huddleston	All-around	12.433	11.000	12.200	14.000	13.166	11.466	74.265	59	Did not advance							

=== Rhythmic ===
Bulgaria qualified a squad of rhythmic gymnasts for the group all-around by virtue of a top-three finish at the 2018 World Championships in Sofia. Two more rhythmic gymnasts were added to the roster by finishing in the top sixteen of the individual all-around at the 2019 World Championships in Baku, Azerbaijan. The athletes for the individual and group all-around were announced on 1 July 2021.

Athlete	Event	Qualification						Final					
Athlete	Event	Hoop	Ball	Clubs	Ribbon	Total	Rank	Hoop	Ball	Clubs	Ribbon	Total	Rank
Boryana Kaleyn	Individual	24.100	25.800	26.600	19.150	95.650	8 Q	25.900	25.625	26.650	22.450	100.625	5
Katrin Taseva	Individual	24.450	24.600	24.400	17.650	91.100	14	Did not advance					

Athletes	Event	Qualification				Final			
Athletes	Event	5 balls	3 hoops 2 clubs	Total	Rank	5 balls	3 hoops 2 clubs	Total	Rank
Simona Dyankova; Stefani Kiryakova; Madlen Radukanova; Laura Traets; Erika Zafirova	Group	47.500	44.300	91.800	1 Q	47.550	44.550	92.100	1st place, gold medalist(s)

== Judo ==
Bulgaria entered three judoka (two men and one woman) into the Olympic tournament based on the International Judo Federation Olympics Individual Ranking.

Athlete	Event	Round of 64	Round of 32	Round of 16	Quarterfinals	Semifinals	Repechage	Final / BM	
Athlete	Event	Opposition Result	Opposition Result	Opposition Result	Opposition Result	Opposition Result	Opposition Result	Opposition Result	Rank
Yanislav Gerchev	Men's −60 kg	—N/a	Preciado (ECU); W 10–00	Yang Y-w (TPE); L 00–10	Did not advance				
Ivaylo Ivanov	Men's −81 kg	Bye	Lucenti (ARG); W 10–00	Boltaboev (UZB); L 00–01	Did not advance				
Ivelina Ilieva	Women's−57 kg	—N/a	Khelifi (TUN); W 10–00	Klimkait (CAN); L 00–10	Did not advance				

== Karate ==
Bulgaria entered one karateka into the inaugural Olympic tournament. Ivet Goranova qualified directly for the women's kumite 55 kg category by finishing top three at 2021 World Olympic Qualification Tournament in Paris, France.

Athlete	Event	Group stage					Semifinals	Final
Athlete	Event	Opposition Result	Opposition Result	Opposition Result	Rank	Opposition Result	Opposition Result	Rank
Ivet Goranova	Women's −55 kg	Wen T-y (TPE); W 5–2	Özçelik (TUR); W 5–1	Bahmanyar (IRI); W 5–2	1 Q	Plank (AUT); W 4–3	Terliuga (UKR); W 5–1	1st place, gold medalist(s)

== Shooting ==
Bulgarian shooters achieved quota places for the following events by virtue of their best finishes at the 2018 ISSF World Championships, the 2019 ISSF World Cup series, European Championships or Games, and European Qualifying Tournament, as long as they obtained a minimum qualifying score (MQS) by May 31, 2020.

Athlete	Event	Qualification		Final	
Athlete	Event	Points	Rank	Points	Rank
Selin Ali	Women's trap	115	20	Did not advance	
Maria Grozdeva	Women's 10 m air pistol	559	43	Did not advance	
Maria Grozdeva	Women's 25 m pistol	578	27	Did not advance	
Antoaneta Kostadinova	Women's 10 m air pistol	578	6 Q	239.4	2nd place, silver medalist(s)
Antoaneta Kostadinova	Women's 25 m pistol	590	1 Q	28	4

== Swimming ==
Bulgarian swimmers further achieved qualifying standards in the following events (up to a maximum of 2 swimmers in each event at the Olympic Qualifying Time (OQT), and potentially 1 at the Olympic Selection Time (OST)):

Athlete	Event	Heat		Semifinal		Final	
Athlete	Event	Time	Rank	Time	Rank	Time	Rank
Lyubomir Epitropov	Men's 100 m breaststroke	1:00.71	32	Did not advance			
Lyubomir Epitropov	Men's 200 m breaststroke	2:09.68	14 Q	2:10.33	15	Did not advance	
Antani Ivanov	Men's 100 m butterfly	52.25	29	Did not advance			
Antani Ivanov	Men's 200 m butterfly	1:56.36	20	Did not advance			
Kaloyan Levterov	Men's 100 m backstroke	55.60	37	Did not advance			
Kaloyan Levterov	Men's 200 m backstroke	1:58.96	24	Did not advance			
Josif Miladinov	Men's 100 m butterfly	51.28	6 Q	51.06	4 Q	51.49	8
Diana Petkova	Women's 100 m breaststroke	1:10.61	34	Did not advance			
Diana Petkova	Women's 200 m individual medley	2:16.70	25	Did not advance			

== Table tennis ==
Bulgaria entered one athlete into the table tennis competition at the Games. Polina Trifonova booked the third of four women's singles spots with a third-stage final victory at the European Qualification Tournament in Odivelas, Portugal.

Athlete	Event	Preliminary	Round 1	Round 2	Round 3	Round of 16	Quarterfinals	Semifinals	Final / BM	
Athlete	Event	Opposition Result	Opposition Result	Opposition Result	Opposition Result	Opposition Result	Opposition Result	Opposition Result	Opposition Result	Rank
Polina Trifonova	Women's singles	Hanffou (CMR); W 4–1	de Nutte (LUX); W 4–3	Yang Xx (MON); L 1–4	Did not advance					

== Weightlifting ==
Bulgarian weightlifters qualified for two quota places at the games, based on the Tokyo 2020 Rankings Qualification List of 11 June 2021.

Athlete	Event	Snatch		Clean & Jerk		Total	Rank
Athlete	Event	Result	Rank	Result	Rank	Total	Rank
Bozhidar Andreev	Men's −73 kg	154	4	184	7	338	5
Hristo Hristov	Men's −109 kg	189	3	219	6	408	5

== Wrestling ==
Bulgaria qualified seven wrestlers for each of the following classes into the Olympic competition. One of them finished among the top six to book Olympic spots in the women's freestyle 62 kg at the 2019 World Championships, while four additional licenses were awarded to the Bulgarian wrestlers, who progressed to the top two finals of their respective weight categories at the 2021 European Olympic Qualification Tournament in Budapest, Hungary. Two Bulgarian wrestlers claimed one of the remaining slots each in the men's Greco-Roman 77 kg and women's freestyle 68 kg, respectively, to complete the nation's roster at the 2021 World Qualification Tournament in Sofia.

Key:

- VT (ranking points: 5–0 or 0–5) – Victory by fall.
- VB (ranking points: 5–0 or 0–5) – Victory by injury (VF for forfeit, VA for withdrawal or disqualification)
- PP (ranking points: 3–1 or 1–3) – Decision by points – the loser with technical points.
- PO (ranking points: 3–0 or 0–3) – Decision by points – the loser without technical points.
- ST (ranking points: 4–0 or 0–4) – Great superiority – the loser without technical points and a margin of victory of at least 8 (Greco-Roman) or 10 (freestyle) points.
- SP (ranking points: 4–1 or 1–4) – Technical superiority – the loser with technical points and a margin of victory of at least 8 (Greco-Roman) or 10 (freestyle) points.

Freestyle

Athlete	Event	Round of 16	Quarterfinal	Semifinal	Repechage	Final / BM	
Athlete	Event	Opposition Result	Opposition Result	Opposition Result	Opposition Result	Opposition Result	Rank
Georgi Vangelov	Men's −57 kg	Kherbache (ALG); W 5–0 ^{VT}	Dahiya (IND); L 1–4 ^{SP}	Did not advance	Tigreros (COL); W 5–0 ^{VT}	Sanayev (KAZ); L 1–3 ^{PP}	5
Miglena Selishka	Women's −50 kg	Vuc (ROU); W 3–0 ^{PO}	Hildebrandt (USA); L 1–4 ^{SP}	Did not advance			7
Evelina Nikolova	Women's −57 kg	Wrzesień (POL); W 3–0 ^{PO}	Nichita (MDA); W 3–1 ^{PP}	Kurachkina (BLR); L 0–4 ^{ST}	Bye	Koblova (ROC); W 5–0 ^{VT}	3rd place, bronze medalist(s)
Taybe Yusein	Women's −62 kg	Nunes (BRA); W 3–1 ^{PP}	Khürelkhüü (MGL); W 4–0 ^{ST}	Kawai (JPN); L 2–3 ^{PP}	Bye	Ovcharova (ROC); W 4–0 ^{ST}	3rd place, bronze medalist(s)
Mimi Hristova	Women's −68 kg	Zhumanazarova (KGZ); L 1–3 ^{PP}	Did not advance				11

Greco-Roman

Athlete	Event	Round of 16	Quarterfinal	Semifinal	Repechage	Final / BM	
Athlete	Event	Opposition Result	Opposition Result	Opposition Result	Opposition Result	Opposition Result	Rank
Aik Mnatsakanian	Men's −77 kg	Starčević (CRO); L 1–3 ^{PP}	Did not advance				12
Kiril Milov	Men's −97 kg	İldem (TUR); W 3–1 ^{PP}	Saravi (IRI); L 0–3 ^{PO}	Did not advance			8

== See also ==
- Bulgaria at the 2020 Summer Paralympics
