= Sofi Marinova =

Bulgarian singer (born 1975)

Sofi Marinova Софи Маринова
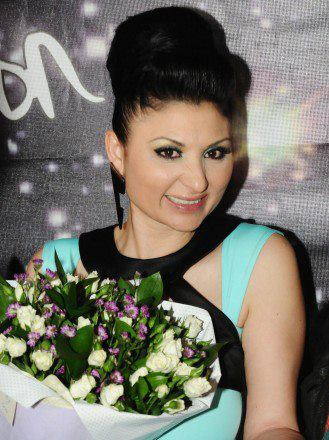
- Sofi Marinova after winning the Bulgarian Eurovision 2012 National Final

Background information
- Born: Sofiya Marinova Kamenova; 5 December 1975 (age 50); Sofia, Bulgaria
- Genres: Pop-folk; ethno-pop; dance
- Occupation: Singer-songwriter
- Instrument: Vocals
- Years active: 1992–present
- Labels: Ara Music; Sunny Music

Sofiya Marinova Kamenova (Bulgarian: София Маринова Каменова, pronounced [soˈfi maˈrinova]), known professionally as Sofi Marinova (Bulgarian: Софи Маринова) is a Bulgarian pop-folk and ethno-pop singer. She has been dubbed "the Romani pearl" and "the Romani nightingale". She represented Bulgaria in the Eurovision Song Contest 2012 with the song "Love Unlimited". During her career, she has collaborated with several other Bulgarian singers such as Preslava, Azis, and Toni Storaro.

== Early life ==
Sofi Marinova was born 5 December 1975 in Sofia, Bulgaria, although lived with her family in Etropole until the age of 15. She has four brothers. She first displayed musical talent at the age of two. Marinova cites singing at a fair in Etropole at the age of 12 as the moment she realized people enjoyed listening to her; her mother had asked some musicians there if her daughter could sing a song, and her performance attracted a crowd and applause. After 8th grade, she transferred to a professional school for tailors, though she later she admitted she never liked sewing. While at school, Marinova fell for acting, appearing in school musicals such as Snow White. When she was in 10th grade, a local band offered her the position of lead singer. Her father didn't allow it at first, but relented after the insistence of her mother: "I started crying and my mother supported me, because when she married my father she had to put an end to her singing career".

At the age of 17, Marinova began performing at weddings, parties, and baptisms. Her repertoire included songs from Dragana Mirković, Ceca Ražnatovic, Sandra, Michael Jackson, and Whitney Houston, as well as Romani music. Around this time, she took part in a music competition in the village of Osikovitsa near Sofia. She won the singers event and the admirations of the jury, chaired by the famous Bulgarian Romani musician Angelo Malikov. At the competition she also met Petar, a drummer, who later became the father of her only child, Lorenzo. After Osikovitsa, Marinova won the Grand prize at the Stara Zagora festival with her songs "Stari rani" (Old wounds) and "Slanchitse moe" (My Little Sun).

== Career ==
Marinova made her recording debut in 1995 with the release of the Romani-language album Мечта in collaboration with the band Super Express. In 1996, Super Express and Marinova released another Romani-language album, Без конкуренция, for the record company Ara Music; the president, Nencho Kasamov, saw Marinova performing in a restaurant and asked her to record an album because he sensed the future music star in her "by the look in her eyes."

Marinova released her first solo album, Единствен мой, in 1998.

In 2004, Marinova signed with Sunny Music, working with the producer Krum Krumov. She recorded the albums 5 oktavi lyubov and Obicham. Her collaboration with the Bulgarian hip-hop musician Ustata resulted in some of her most successful songs. In that period, she also recorded a Romani cover of "Vetrove" by Lili Ivanova, Bulgaria's most established music artist. The compilation Sofi Marinova Best MP3 Collection consisting of her 64 most popular songs from her Sunny Music period, was released in 2009. She stated that she was "happy that my project was accomplished and I hope my fans accept it as a gift for their loyalty and love for me for so many years."

On 28 March 2012, as part of the pre-celebrations for the International Romani Day, Sofi Marinova sang Romani songs and her Eurovision song "Love Unlimited" in front of MEPs and official guests in the building of the European Parliament in Brussels. She was invited there by the MEPs from Bulgaria.

=== Philanthropy and charity work ===
In 2008, Marinova and Ustata joined a campaign against human trafficking, for which they recorded "Chuzhdi ustni" (A Stranger's Lips). Both of them travelled around Bulgaria and met with youth in the risk groups for becoming victims of human trafficking. In 2010, Marinova was appointed ambassador against poverty and social isolation. Her tasks include raising awareness about the issues, taking part in various activities and sharing her own experience. On her appointment she told the journalists: "I think I can be useful to the campaign. In addition I myself come from a poor family and I'm aware of the concerns of poor and underprivileged people."

=== Personal life ===
Marinova has one son, Lorenzo, with whom she has released a collaboration single. She was married once (to Lorenzo's father Petar). She then had a long-term relationship with Dacho, who is Petar's eldest son. They tried to marry two times, but they didn't and finally broke up in 2010. She is well known for her honest and direct answers to media's questions in interviews.

== Eurovision Song Contest 2012 ==
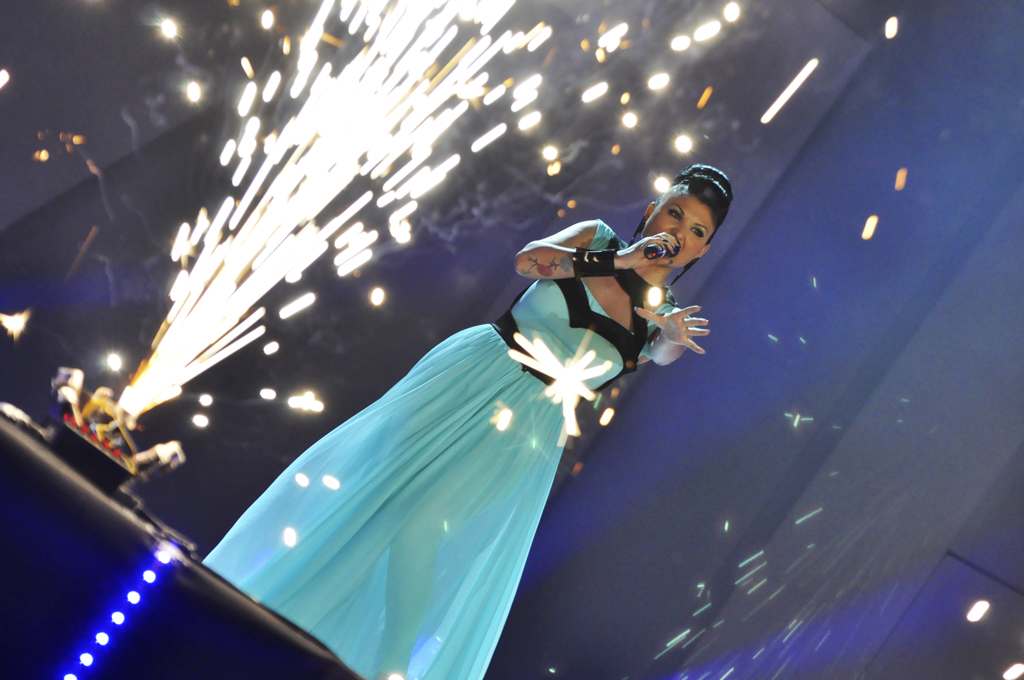
Sofi Marinova performing at the Eurovision National Final in Bulgaria at National Palace of Culture, Sofia.

Sofi Marinova was chosen to represent Bulgaria in the Eurovision Song Contest 2012 with the song "Love Unlimited". She won the national final, which was held on 29 February, receiving a total of 20 points - the maximum 12 points from the public and 8 points from the jury. She was one of the favourites to win after coming second in the public vote in the semifinals. "Love Unlimited" was written by Yassen Kotsev and Krum Georgiev. Its lyrics talk about the transcending and all-embracing power of love. The song is primarily in Bulgarian but contains the phrase "I love you" in Turkish, Greek, Spanish, Serbo-Croatian, French, Romani, English, Azerbaijani, Italian and Arabic. The song is characterized by the typical Romani glides, vocal power and techno musical arrangement. Marinova performed in the first half of the second semifinal on 24 May and narrowly missed out on qualifying for the grand final, finishing 11th place and scoring the same number of points as Norway who got through in tenth place.

This was Marinova's third appearance in the Bulgarian national finals for Eurovision. In 2005, her collaboration with Slavi Trifonov "Edinstveni" (Only Ones) finished second. They tried again the following year with the song "Lyubovta e otrova" (Love Is the Poison), but fell out in the qualifications after taking 25th place, one place short of the semi-final. In 2007, her collaboration with Ustata, "Ya tvoya" (I'm Yours), finished third in the national final.

== Discography ==
Solo albums

Year	Cyrillic	Transliteration	Translation	Label
1998	Единствен мой	Edinstven moy	My One and Only	Ara Audio-Video
1999	Моят сън	Moyat san	My Dream	Ara Audio-Video
2000	Студен пламък	Studen plamak	Cold Flame	Ara Audio-Video
2001	Нежна е нощта	Nezhna e noshta	Tender Is the Night	Ara Audio-Video
2002	Осъдена любов	Osadena lyubov	Condemned Love	Ara Audio-Video
2004	5 октави любов	5 oktavi lyubov	5 Octaves of Love	Sunny Music
2005	Обичам	Obicham	I Love	Sunny Music
2006	Остани	Ostani	Stay	Sunny Music
2008	Време спри	Vreme spri	Time, Stop	Sunny Music
2009	VIP-ът	Vipat	VIP	Sunny Music
2013	Софи Маринова 2013	Sofi Marinova 2013	Sofi Marinova 2013	Sunny Music

Albums with the band Super Express

Year	Cyrillic	Transliteration	Translation	Label
1995	Мечта*	Mechta	Dream	Magic Music
1996	Без конкуренция*	Bez konkurentsia	No Competition	Ara Audio-Video
1997	Стари рани	Stari rani	Old Wounds	Ara Audio-Video
1999*	Песни от сърце / Гиля таровило	Pesni ot sartse / Gilya tarovilo	Songs From the Heart	Ara Audio-Video

.* — Romani language albums

Compilations

Year	Title	Label	Notes
2003	Best 1	Ara Audio-Video	17 ballads
2003	Best 2	Ara Audio-Video	18 dance songs
2005	Hitove (Хитове)	Ara Audio-Video	18 songs
2007	Golden Hits	Ara Audio-Video	71 songs in MP3 format
2010	MP3 Best Collection	Sunny Music	64 songs in MP3 format

The MP3 album Golden Hits contains all the songs from Sofi Marinova's first five solo albums plus some songs from her albums with Super Express and a few other songs.

Awards and achievements
Preceded by Poli Genova with "Na inat"	Bulgaria in the Eurovision Song Contest; 2012	Succeeded by Elitsa Todorova & Stoyan Yankulov with "Samo shampioni"
