= Mao Kunii =

Japanese group rhythmic gymnast

- Born: 5 April 1996 (age 30)

Gymnastics career
- Discipline: Rhythmic gymnastics
- Country represented: Japan (2015)
Medal record
Group rhythmic gymnastics
Representing Japan
World Championships
Bronze medal – third place	2015 Suttgart	5 ribbons
Bronze medal – third place	2017 Pesaro	All-around
Bronze medal – third place	2017 Pesaro	5 Hoops

Mao Kunii (国井 麻緒, Kunii Mao; born 5 April 1996) is a Japanese group rhythmic gymnast.

== Career ==
She represents her nation at international competitions. She competed at world championships, including at the 2015 World Rhythmic Gymnastics Championships where she won the bronze medal in the 5 ribbons event.
