= Bulgaria in the Eurovision Song Contest 2012 =

- Eurovision Song Contest 2012
- Participating broadcaster: Bulgarian National Television (BNT)
- Country: Bulgaria
- Selection process: Bŭlgarskata pesen v „Evroviziya 2012”
- Selection date: 29 February 2012

Competing entry
- Song: "Love Unlimited"
- Artist: Sofi Marinova
- Songwriters: Yasen Kozev; Krum Geopriev; Donka Vasileva

Placement
- Semi-final result: Failed to qualify (11th)

Participation chronology

Bulgaria was represented at the Eurovision Song Contest 2012 with the song "Love Unlimited" written by Yasen Kozev, Krum Georgiev and Doni Vasileva, and performed by Sofi Marinova. The Bulgarian participating broadcaster, Bulgarian National Television (BNT), organised the national final Bŭlgarskata pesen v „Evroviziya 2012” in order to select its entry for the contest. 22 entries were selected to participate in the national final which consisted of two shows: a semi-final and a final, held on 14 January 2012 and 29 February 2012, respectively. Twelve songs qualified to the final from the semi-final. In the final, "Love Unlimited" performed by Sofi Marinova emerged as the winning entry following the combination of votes from a 24-member jury panel and a public televote.

Bulgaria was drawn to compete in the second semi-final of the Eurovision Song Contest which took place on 24 May 2012. Performing during the show in position 8, "Love Unlimited" was not announced among the top 10 entries of the second semi-final and therefore did not qualify to compete in the final. It was later revealed that Bulgaria placed eleventh out of the 18 participating countries in the semi-final with 45 points.

== Background ==
Prior to the 2012 contest, Bulgarian National Television (BNT) had participated in the Eurovision Song Contest representing Bulgaria seven times since its first entry in 2005. It achieved its best result in 2007 with the song "Water" performed by Elitsa Todorova and Stoyan Yankoulov, which placed fifth. To this point, their 2007 entry is also the only Bulgarian entry to have qualified to the Eurovision final; the nation had failed to qualify to the final with their other six entries. In 2011, "Na inat" by Poli Genova failed to qualify to the final.

As part of its duties as participating broadcaster, BNT organises the selection of its entry in the Eurovision Song Contest and broadcasts the event in the country. The broadcaster confirmed its participation in the 2012 contest on 24 August 2011. In the past, BNT had alternated between both internal selections and national finals in order to select the Bulgarian entry. In 2011, the broadcaster organised a national final in order to select the entry for the competition, a selection procedure that continued for its 2012 entry.

== Before Eurovision ==
=== Bŭlgarskata pesen na „Evroviziya 2012” ===
Bŭlgarskata pesen v „Evroviziya 2012” (The Bulgarian song in Eurovision 2012) was the national final format developed by BNT which determined the artist and song that would represent Bulgaria at the Eurovision Song Contest 2012. The competition consisted of a semi-final on 14 January 2012 and a final on 29 February 2012. Both shows were hosted by Milenita, Alexander Sano and Dragomir Draganov and broadcast on BNT 1 as well as online via the broadcaster's website bnt.bg. The final was also streamed online at the official Eurovision Song Contest website eurovision.tv.

==== Format ====
The selection of the competing entries for the national final and ultimately the Bulgarian Eurovision entry took place over three rounds. The first round involved a 24-member committee consisting of music professionals, members of the media and advertising agency representatives, titled Academy, shortlisting entries from the received submissions. The second round was a live audition of the shortlisted entries that took place on 23 and 24 November 2011. The Academy selected 22 semi-finalists to proceed to the third round, the televised national final. The semi-final of the competition featured the twenty-two competing entries and the votes of the Academy as well as public televoting each selected one entry to advance to the final. An additional ten qualifiers qualified based on the combined votes from the Academy and public. In the final, the twelve competing entries were voted upon by the 50/50 combination of the Academy and public in order to select the winner. In the event of a tie, the entry that receives the highest score from the public was declared the winner.

==== Competing entries ====
On 9 September 2011, BNT opened a submission period for artists and songwriters to submit their entries until 11 November 2011. Songs were required to contain partial Bulgarian involvement. By the end of the deadline, the broadcaster received 64 entries. On 16 November 2011, the 33 artists and songs shortlisted by the Academy were announced. The live audition round took place on 23 and 24 November 2011 at the BNT Studio 1 in Sofia where the Academy selected twenty-two artists and songs for the competition. "Ima li pŭt" performed by Ivaylo Kolev was later withdrawn from the competition and replaced with the song "You Are the World" performed by Bee in the Bonnet.

Members of the Academy
Group	Members
Music professionals	Angel Zaberski; Haygashod Aghasyan; Michail Belchev; Yordan Eftimov; Tsenko Minkin; Zhivko Kolev; Georgi Enchev; Vasil Gyurov; Maria Ganeva; Milka Miteva; Ani Varbanova; Toni Shekerdzhieva-Novak; Diana Ruseva
Media	Yurdan Lazarov Lazarov; Yasen Atanasov; Kristiyan Boyadzhiev; Dragomir Simeonov; Ana-Maria Tonkova; Vasil Dimitrov; Atanas Genov; Gergana Turiyska; Georgi Kostov
Advertising agencies	Mariana Brashnarova; Iliyan Stoychev

Artist	Song	Songwriter(s)	Points	Place
New 5	"Chance for Better Life"	Jura Tone, Dian Solo	190	1
Ivaylo Kolev feat. Hypnotick	"Searching for the Words"	Jim Peterik, Ivan Kutikov	166	2
Dess	"Love Is Alive"	Sebastian Arman, Borislav Milanov, Desislava Doneva	160	3
Tsvetelin Atanasov-Elvisa feat. DZ	"Love Goes Around"	Mariela Neykova, Svetlin Kaslev	144	4
Sofi Marinova	"Love Unlimited"	Yasen Kozev, Krum Georgiev, Doni Vasileva	142	5
Steliyana Hristova	"Pŭtyat" (Пътят)	Lora Dimitrova, Evgeni Parcalev	140	6
Alex and 4Give	"Dream"	Emmanuel Totev	136	7
Margarita Hranova	"Proshka" (Прошка)	Atanas Kosev	130	8
Todor Gadzhalov	"Still Love You"	Katya Hristovska, Teodor Karokolev	130	8
Viktoriya Dimitrova	"Novo nebe" (Ново небе)	Viktoriya Dimitrova, Julian Janev	116	10
Svetozar Hristov	"Keep Me Down"	Svetozar Hristov, Yana Grueva	112	11
Better Than Grey	"Dream"	Bogdan Bogdanov	112	11
Georgi Varbanov	"This Is My Green Wave"	Georgi Varbanov	108	13
Sonya Ivanova	"Finalna lyubov" (Финална любов)	Sonya Ivanova	106	14
Rene Ranev	"Alone"	Rene Ranev	100	15
Teni Omede	"Without You"	Krassimir Iliev, Teni Omede	98	16
Sunnie	"Shut Your Mouth and Do It"	Stanislava Dimitrova-Sunnie, Yakim Diankov	96	17
Vyara Pantaleeva	"Vyara" (Вяра)	Daniela Kuzmanova, Daniel Milev	92	18
Simona Sivanio	"Eternal"	Rita Pace, Yaron Malachi	88	19
Monika Kirovska	"You Are My Angel"	Tsvetan Vlaykov	84	20
Go Week	"The Way You See the World"	Ventsislav Ivanov, Hristo Mikhalkov	82	21
Bee in the Bonnet	"You Are the World"	Teodora Ilieva, Krassimir Tenev	80	22

==== Semi-final ====
The semi-final took place on 14 January 2012 at the BNT Studio 1 in Sofia. Twelve entries qualified to the final. The songs ranked first by the Academy and a public televote automatically advanced; an additional ten qualifiers were determined by the 50/50 combination of votes awarded by the public and the Academy. In addition to the performances of the competing entries, guest performers were Gravity Co., StringS quartet and "Diva" Ballet Group.

Academy qualifier Public vote qualifier Academy and public vote qualifier

Semi-final – 14 January 2012
R/O	Artist	Song	Jury		Televote		Total	Place
R/O	Artist	Song	Votes	Points	Votes	Points	Total	Place
1	New 5	"Chance for Better Life"	124	12	1,547	12	24	1
2	Vyara Pantaleeva	"Vyara"	58	4	289	0	4	10
3	Sonya Ivanova	"Finalna lyubov"	24	0	95	0	0	19
4	Monika Kirovska	"You Are My Angel"	10	0	40	0	0	20
5	Margarita Hranova	"Proshka"	57	3	92	0	3	11
6	Sunnie	"Shut Your Mouth and Do It"	15	0	130	0	0	17
7	Tsvetelin Atanasov-Elvisa feat. DZ	"Love Goes Around"	77	5	541	5	10	5
8	Steliyana Hristova	"Pŭtyat"	88	7	774	8	15	3
9	Viktoriya Dimitrova	"Novo nebe"	47	0	128	0	0	18
10	Teni Omede	"Without You"	31	0	226	0	0	14
11	Alex and 4Give	"Dream"	46	0	180	0	0	15
12	Todor Gadzhalov	"Still Love You"	95	8	517	4	12	4
13	Dess	"Love Is Alive"	148	—	2,396	—	—	—
14	Georgi Varbanov	"This Is My Green Wave"	13	0	333	1	1	12
15	Sofi Marinova	"Love Unlimited"	93	—	2,162	—	—	—
16	Better Than Grey	"Dream"	33	0	296	0	0	13
17	Svetozar Hristov	"Keep Me Down"	82	6	505	3	9	6
18	Rene Ranev	"Alone"	53	2	476	2	4	9
19	Bee in the Bonnet	"You Are the World"	22	0	136	0	0	16
20	Simona Sivanio	"Eternal"	11	0	770	7	7	7
21	Ivaylo Kolev feat. Hypnotick	"Searching for the Words"	97	10	1,249	10	20	2
22	Go Week	"The Way You See the World"	52	1	667	6	7	8

==== Final ====
The final took place on 29 February 2012 at the National Palace of Culture in Sofia. The twelve semi-final qualifiers competed and "Love Unlimited" performed by Sofi Marinova was selected as the winner by the 50/50 combination of votes awarded by public televoting and the Academy. New 5 and Sofi Marinova were tied at 20 points each but since Marinova received the most votes from the public she was declared the winner. In addition to the performances of the competing entries, guest performers were TE, Grafa, Nelly Rangelova, Vasil Naydenov, Bulgarian Eurovision Song Contest 2007 entrant Elitsa Todorova and Stoyan Yankoulov, Cypriot Eurovision Song Contest 2012 entrant Ivi Adamou, 2012 Danish Eurovision Song Contest entrant Soluna Samay, 2012 French Eurovision Song Contest entrant Anggun and 2012 Maltese Eurovision Song Contest entrant Kurt Calleja.

Final – 29 February 2012
R/O	Artist	Song	Jury	Televote		Total	Place
R/O	Artist	Song	Jury	Votes	Points	Total	Place
1	Go Week	"The Way You See the World"	6	1,033	5	11	6
2	Todor Gadzhalov	"Still Love You"	10	532	2	12	4
3	Steliyana Hristova	"Pŭtyat"	3	1,708	6	9	7
4	Rene Ranev	"Alone"	1	331	0	1	11
5	Dess	"Love Is Alive"	5	3,730	10	15	3
6	Svetozar Hristov	"Keep Me Down"	7	530	1	8	8
7	Simona Sivanio	"Eternal"	0	556	3	3	10
8	Ivaylo Kolev feat. Hipnotik	"Searching for the Words"	4	1,785	7	11	5
9	Sofi Marinova	"Love Unlimited"	8	6,910	12	20	1
10	Vyara Pantaleeva	"Vyara"	0	366	0	0	12
11	New 5	"Chance for Better Life"	12	2,861	8	20	2
12	Tsvetelin Atanasov-Elvisa feat. DZ	"Love Goes Around"	2	713	4	6	9

=== Promotion ===
Sofi Marinova made several appearances across Europe to specifically promote "Love Unlimited" as the Bulgarian Eurovision entry. On 12 March, Marinova performed "Love Unlimited" during the Greek Eurovision national final. Between 18 and 20 April, Marinova took part in promotional activities in Turkey where she appeared on TRT Müzik, Kanal D and TV8. On 21 April, Marinova performed during the Eurovision in Concert event which was held at the Melkweg venue in Amsterdam, Netherlands and hosted by Ruth Jacott and Cornald Maas. On 25 April, Marinova appeared in and performed during the Jutarnji Program on RTS1 in Serbia.

== At Eurovision ==
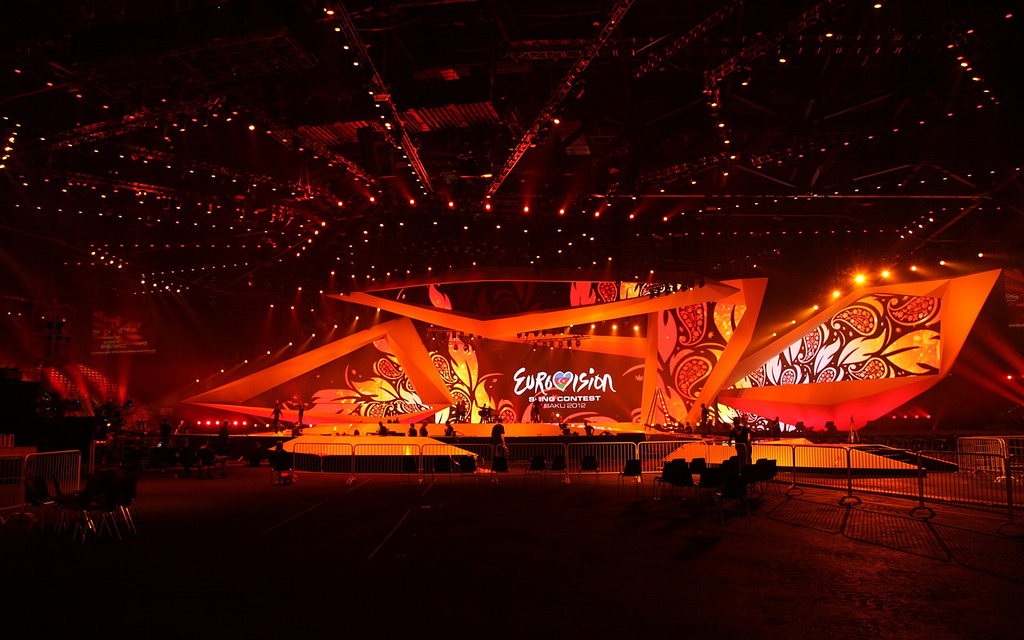
The Eurovision Song Contest 2012 took place at the Baku Crystal Hall in Baku, Azerbaijan

According to Eurovision rules, all nations with the exceptions of the host country and the "Big Five" (France, Germany, Italy, Spain and the United Kingdom) are required to qualify from one of two semi-finals in order to compete for the final; the top ten countries from each semi-final progress to the final. The European Broadcasting Union (EBU) split up the competing countries into six different pots based on voting patterns from previous contests, with countries with favourable voting histories put into the same pot. On 25 January 2012, a special allocation draw was held which placed each country into one of the two semi-finals, as well as which half of the show they would perform in. Bulgaria was placed into the second semi-final, to be held on 24 May 2012, and was scheduled to perform in the first half of the show. The running order for the semi-finals was decided through another draw on 20 March 2012 and Bulgaria was set to perform in position 8, following the entry from Ukraine and before the entry from Slovenia.

The two semi-finals and the final were broadcast in Bulgaria on BNT 1 with commentary by Elena Rosberg and Georgi Kushvaliev. The Bulgarian spokesperson, who announced the Bulgarian votes during the final, was Anna Angelova.

=== Semi-final ===
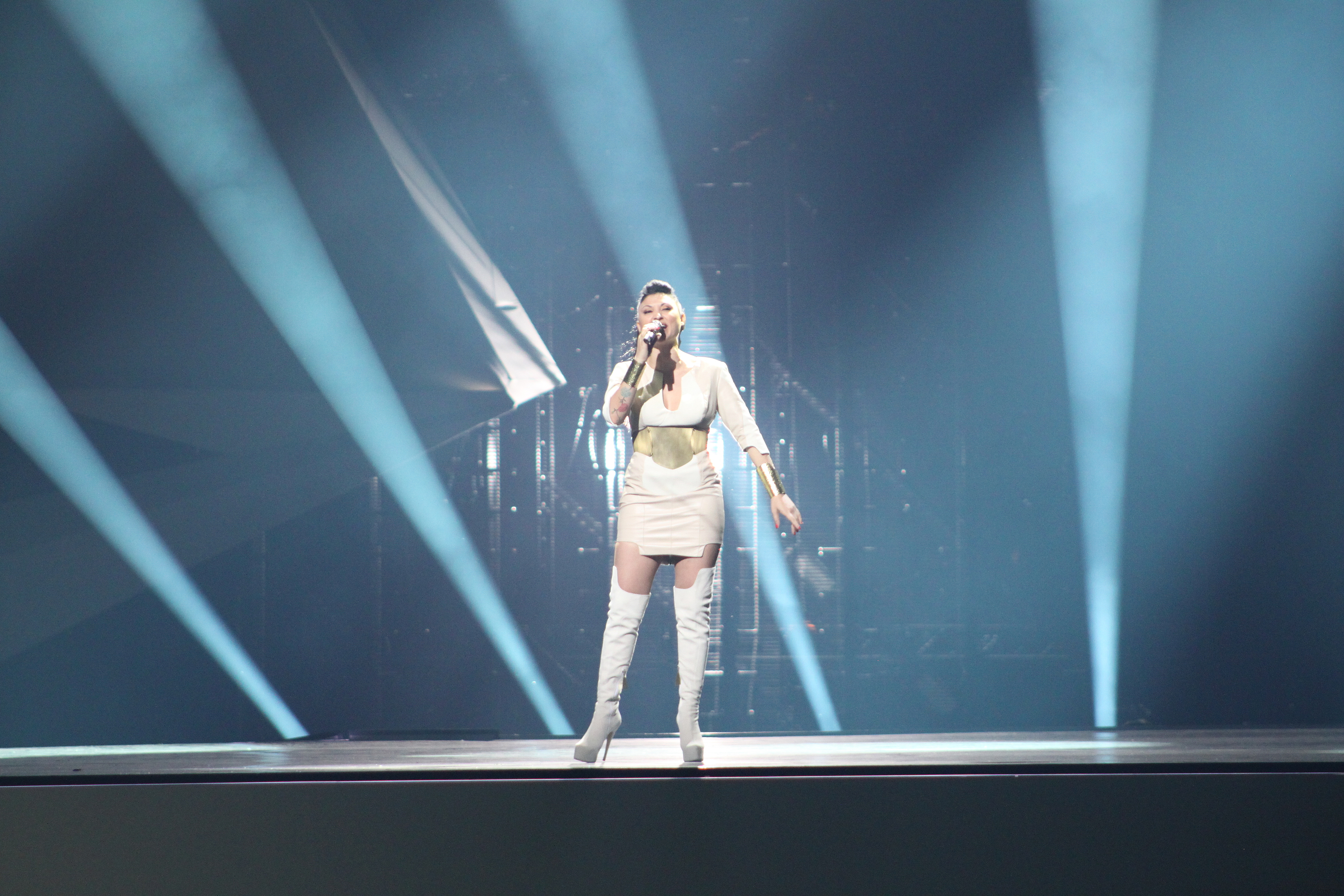
Sofi Marinova during a rehearsal before the second semi-final

Sofi Marinova took part in technical rehearsals on 15 and 18 May, followed by dress rehearsals on 23 and 24 May. This included the jury final where professional juries of each country watched and voted on the competing entries.

The Bulgarian performance featured Sofi Marinova performing on stage in a white leather costume with golden accessories. The stage colours were predominantly pink and the LED screens displayed white waves with flashing spotlights across the stage. The performance also featured several effects including pyrotechnic shots from the stage and on the rotating discs in the background, smoke and a wind machine.

At the end of the show, Bulgaria was not announced among the top 10 entries in the second semi-final and therefore failed to qualify to compete in the final. It was later revealed that Bulgaria placed eleventh in the semi-final, tying with tenth-placed Norway and receiving a total of 45 points. Under tiebreak rules, the number of countries that voted for Norway (11) was higher than the number for Bulgaria (10). This resulted in Norway qualifying to the final over Bulgaria.

=== Voting ===
Voting during the three shows consisted of 50 percent public televoting and 50 percent from a jury deliberation. The jury consisted of five music industry professionals who were citizens of the country they represent. This jury was asked to judge each contestant based on: vocal capacity; the stage performance; the song's composition and originality; and the overall impression by the act. In addition, no member of a national jury could be related in any way to any of the competing acts in such a way that they cannot vote impartially and independently.

Following the release of the full split voting by the EBU after the conclusion of the competition, it was revealed that Bulgaria had placed ninth with the public televote and seventeenth with the jury vote in the second semi-final. In the public vote, Bulgaria scored 59 points, while with the jury vote, Bulgaria scored 27 points.

Below is a breakdown of points awarded to Bulgaria and awarded by Bulgaria in the second semi-final and grand final of the contest. The nation awarded its 12 points to Serbia in the semi-final and the final of the contest.

==== Points awarded to Bulgaria ====
Points awarded to Bulgaria (Semi-final 2)
Score	Country
12 points	
10 points	Turkey
8 points	
7 points	
6 points	Macedonia; Norway; Portugal
5 points	United Kingdom
4 points	
3 points	Bosnia and Herzegovina; France
2 points	Germany; Malta; Serbia
1 point	

==== Points awarded by Bulgaria ====
Points awarded by Bulgaria (Semi-final 2)
Score	Country
12 points	Serbia
10 points	Sweden
8 points	Turkey
7 points	Macedonia
6 points	Malta
5 points	Ukraine
4 points	Lithuania
3 points	Estonia
2 points	Norway
1 point	Bosnia and Herzegovina

Points awarded by Bulgaria (Final)
Score	Country
12 points	Serbia
10 points	Azerbaijan
8 points	Sweden
7 points	Turkey
6 points	Russia
5 points	Lithuania
4 points	Albania
3 points	Spain
2 points	Macedonia
1 point	Greece
