= Teodora Aleksandrova =

Bulgarian rhythmic gymnast

- Nickname: Alex
- Born: 17 July 2001 (age 25) Sofia, Bulgaria
- Height: 166 cm (5 ft 5 in)

Gymnastics career
- Discipline: Rhythmic gymnastics
- Country represented: Bulgaria; (2015—2018)
- Club: Levski
- Head coach: Bozhidara Lambova
- Assistant coach: Vesela Dimitrova
Medal record
Group Rhythmic Gymnastics
Representing Bulgaria
World Championships
| Silver medal – second place | 2017 Pesaro | Group All-around |
| Bronze medal – third place | 2017 Pesaro | 3 Balls + 2 Ropes |
Junior European Championships
| Bronze medal – third place | 2015 Minsk | 5 Balls |

Teodora Aleksandrova (Bulgarian: Теодора Александрова, born 17 July 2001) is a Bulgarian group rhythmic gymnast. She is the 2017 World group all-around silver medalist and a 2015 European Junior group bronze medalist.

== Biography ==
Aleksandrova began gymnastics at age 4. She competed at the 2015 European Championships as a member of the junior group, which won bronze with 5 balls.

In 2017, she competed as part of the national senior group. The group competed at the 2017 World Championships in Pesaro, where they won silver in the all-around and bronze with 3 balls + 2 ropes.

The 2018 World Championships were held in Aleksandrova's home country of Bulgaria, and in an interview at the beginning of the year, the members of the group noted excitement of the opportunity to compete in front of a home crowd. Aleksandrova said that the group worked well together because the members had good relationships with each other. Although she had pain in her leg, she competed with the rest of the group at the World Cup in Sofia, held 30 March to 1 April. They won the all-around and the 5 hoops final as well as bronze in the 3 balls + 2 ropes final.

Later in April, however, Aleksandrova was diagnosed with a fractured foot and was forced to miss the European Championships. She underwent surgery, but after she returned to training in July, she began to suffer pain again, and it was determined that she needed a second surgery.

In January 2019, it was announced that her career was over due to her injury and that she was replaced in the national group by Galateya Gerova. Aleksandrova accused the Bulgarian federation of telling her that she had faked the pain from her broken foot and of being uncaring about her physical and mental health. The federation said that competing on her injury had been her decision and that they had maintained contact while she recovered from surgery. Later that year, she was entered in the Turkish national championships as an individual, but she ultimately did not switch countries.
