= Elitsa Todorova =

Elitsa Todorova Елица Тодорова
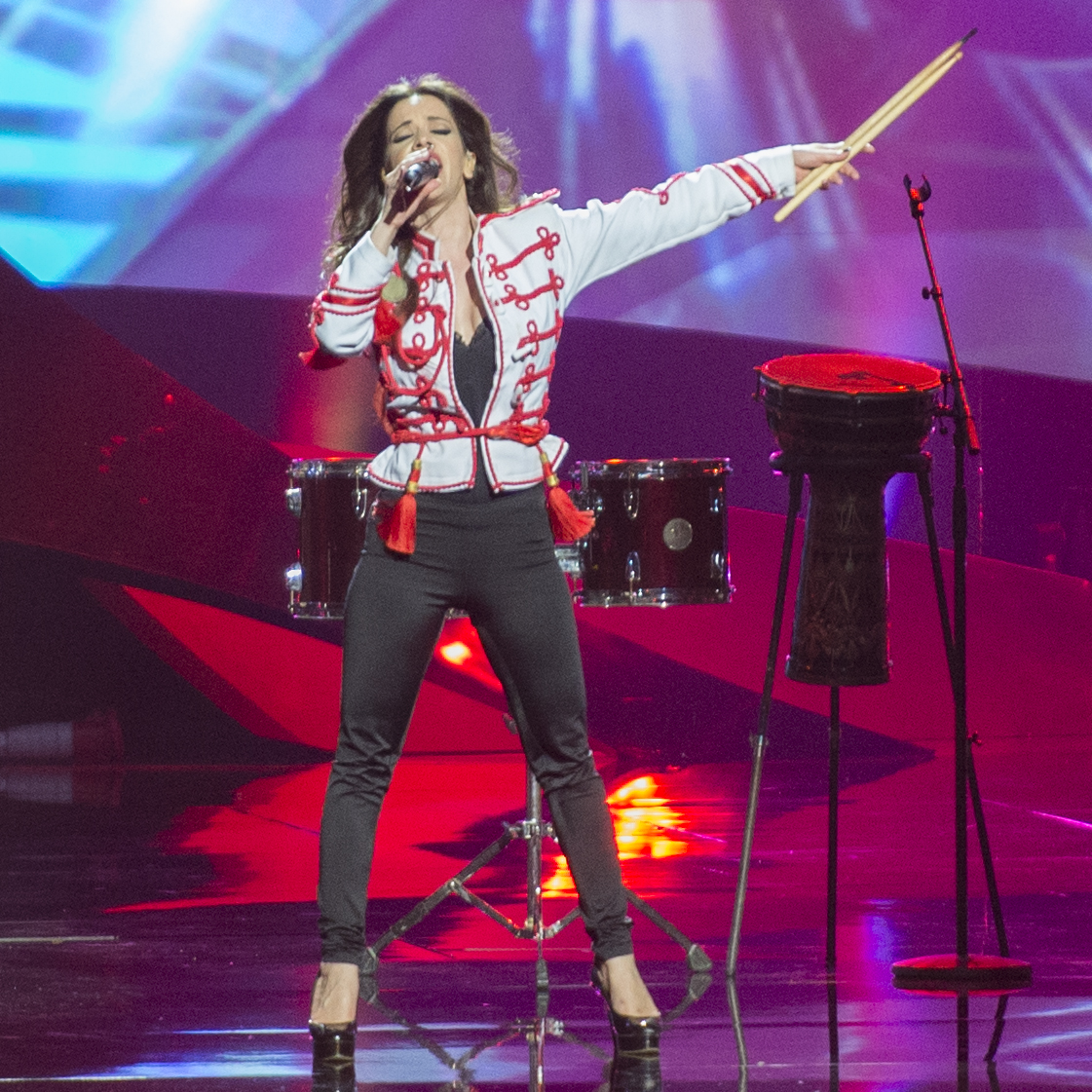
- Todorova at the Eurovision Song Contest 2013.

Background information
- Born: September 2, 1977 (age 49); Varna, Bulgaria
- Genres: Bulgarian folklore Ethno; Neo-folk; Experimental
- Occupations: Singer, percussionist
- Instruments: Tarambuka, drums, maraca, claves, chimes, guiro
- Years active: 1990–present
- Website: www.elitsatodorova.com

Elitsa Todorova (Bulgarian: Елица Тодорова; born September 2, 1977, in Varna, Bulgaria) is a Bulgarian folk singer and professional percussionist. Todorova formed the duo Elitsa & Stoyan and they represented Bulgaria in the Eurovision Song Contest 2007 in Helsinki, and once again represented Bulgaria at the Eurovision Song Contest 2013 in Malmö. The drums, ""The Cosmic tree","The Olympic drums of Bulgaria", "Drum-Pyramid" are among the tools with which she has left an individual impact on ethno-music.

== Career ==
Elitsa was born in Varna. As a child, she spent six years in Africa (specifically Libya, Tunisia and the Western Sahara) with her parents. She has worked with a number of noted choirs, ensembles and musicians (Bulgarian and foreign) and has participated in concerts in a number of countries. She has also been awarded several prizes.

In 2003 Elitsa Todorova began working with Bulgarian drummer and percussionist Stoyan Yankoulov.

== Eurovision 2007 and 2013 ==
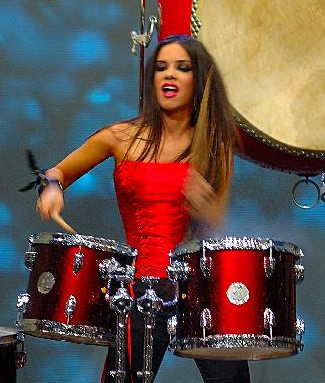
Elitsa at the Eurovision Song Contest 2007

On 25 February 2007, Elitsa & Stoyans song "Water" won the Bulgarian National Television's public contest and was selected as the song to represent Bulgaria in Eurovision Song Contest 2007. The song advanced from the semi-final to become Bulgaria's first ever participation in a final. In the final Elitsa and Stoyan finished in 5th place.

Elitsa & Stoyan represented Bulgaria in the Eurovision Song Contest 2013 in Malmö, this time with the song "Samo shampioni".

== Biography ==
Elitsa started singing in early childhood and played the piano for 7 years. She studied at the "Philip Koutev" school of music in Kotel, specializing in folk singing and the "Dobri Hristov" school of music in Varna, specializing in percussion. She then graduated from the Pancho Vladigerov State Academy of music in Sofia, majoring in percussion.

Together with 2000 Bulgarians in folk costumes, she presented the Bulgarian culture at the World Cultural Music Festival at the Olympic Stadium in Berlin in 2011. In her performance she also presented the unique drum patented under her name – "Cosmic Tree from Bulgaria".

Top 13 World Stage Concerts Elitsa Todorova:

1. America, New York, the United Nations Headquarters
2. France, Paris, Headquarters – UNESCO Hall
3. Germany, Berlin, Olympic stadium
4. Russia, Moscow, Bolshoi Theater
5. Bulgaria, Sofia, Arena Armeec, Vasil Levski Stadium
6. Finland, Helsinki, Hartwall Arena
7. Sweden, Malmö, Malmö Arena
8. Japan, Tokyo
9. Canada, Toronto, The Opera House Hall
10. Italy, Rome Castle Sant'Angelo
11. Greece, Athens, The Acropolis
12. United Kingdom, London, ExCeL London Royal Victoria Dock
13. India, Bangalore

Concert & World Tours in: Holland Haga, cathedral "De Grote Kerk", Belarus Vitebsk, Summer amphitheatre, Spain, Austria, Slovakia, Malta, Portugal, Ireland, Belgium, Turkey, Romania, Belarus, Poland, Luxembourg, Libya, Hungary, Czechoslovakia, Croatia, Yugoslavia, Tunisia, Ukraine, Montenegro, Andorra, Serbia, Macedonia, Albania.

== Awards ==
Elitsa Todorova has over 19 awards and high awards including:

- 2014 March: Honorable "Great Bulgarian" by Greater Bulgaria on the eve of 3 March
- 2011 November: Gold Plaque A follower of the popular allies
- 2010 November: Star of the Alley of Fame in Bulgaria
- 2010 September: Statue Award "Apollon Toxoforos" by Apolonia Foundation Sozopol
- 2010 October: Eco Award by SEEME for the song "Earth"
- 2009 May: BG Radio Eco Award "Green Song of Bulgaria" ("Earth").
- 2008 April: Music Awards of BG Radio.
- 2008 July: Greece Best Video Award for the song "Water" by MAD TV Greece
- 2008 April: Duo Award for 2007 BG Radio
- 2008 April: 2007 song for the song "Water"
- 2008 April: BG radio "Bulgarian the ambassador for Bulgarian culture in the world."
- 2007 June: The statue "Orpheus", gr. Smolyan.
- 2007 June: Zlatna statue for nay-dober video clip of the song "Water" from MAD TV Greece in Atina 2007.
- 2007: "Crystal Lira", a category of pop and rock music.
- 2007 June: Golden statue for the best video clip of the song "Water" from MAD TV Greece in Atina 2007.
- 2007 December: "The wife of a goddess," writing off GRAZIA magazine.
- 2005: The statuette "Golden Phenomenon" for the phenomenal comprehension in the region for singing and instrumental art and presentation in Bulgaria for the culture of light.
- 2005: "Crystal Lira", category of jazz.
- 2005: Diploma from the Embassy in Republic of Austria for the great bringing in popularized to the Bulgarian jazz music in Austria in the framework of the European program "Step across the border".

Awards and achievements
Preceded by Mariana Popova with "Let Me Cry"	Bulgaria in the Eurovision Song Contest; 2007; With: Stoyan Yankoulov	Succeeded by Deep Zone & DJ Balthazar with "DJ, Take Me Away"
Preceded by Sofi Marinova with "Love Unlimited"	Bulgaria in the Eurovision Song Contest; 2013; With: Stoyan Yankoulov	Succeeded by Poli Genova with "If Love Was a Crime"
