= Elitsa and Stoyan =

Bulgarian musical duo

Elitsa and Stoyan Елица и Стоян
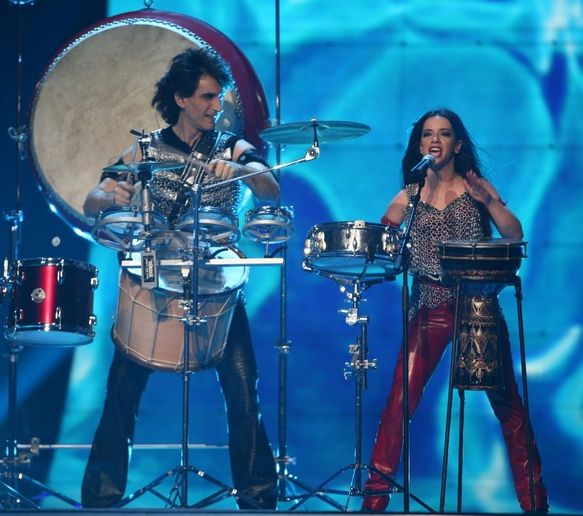
- Stoyan Yankoulov and Elitsa Todorova at ESC 2007

Background information
- Origin: Varna and Sofia, Bulgaria
- Genres: Folk rock, electronic rock, world, worldbeat
- Years active: 2003–present
- Members: Elitsa Todorova; Stoyan Yankoulov

Elitsa and Stoyan (Bulgarian: Елица и Стоян) are a Bulgarian music duo consisting of singers Elitsa Todorova and Stoyan Yankoulov. In 2007, they were the entry for Bulgaria at the Eurovision Song Contest 2007, finishing in fifth place with the song "Water". It remained the highest placement for Bulgaria in the contest until the Eurovision Song Contest 2016. In March 2013, the duo were selected to represent Bulgaria for a second time at the Eurovision Song Contest 2013 with the song "Samo shampioni", but failed to qualify for the final.

== Career ==
Elitsa and Stoyan met in 2003. In 2007 they won Pesen Na Eurovizija 2007 and represented Bulgaria at the Eurovision Song Contest 2007, with the song "Voda (Water)". Later they released their second single "Earth".

On 10 February 2013, Elitsa and Stoyan were selected by the Bulgarian National Television (BNT) to represent Bulgaria in the Eurovision Song Contest 2013. The Bulgarian national selection took place on 3 March 2013, with two songs tied for first place after the combined jury and audience votes, "Kismet" and "Samo shampioni". Kismet was selected as the winning song, however on 11 March 2013, BNT withdrew "Kismet" due to copyright concerns and replaced it with "Samo shampioni". Samo shampioni failed to qualify for the final of Eurovision 2013, finishing in 12th place of Semifinal 2, after being awarded 45 points.

Awards and achievements
Preceded by Mariana Popova with "Let Me Cry"	Bulgaria in the Eurovision Song Contest; 2007	Succeeded by Deep Zone and DJ Balthazar with "DJ, Take Me Away"
Preceded by Sofi Marinova with "Love Unlimited"	Bulgaria in the Eurovision Song Contest; 2013	Succeeded by Poli Genova with "If Love Was a Crime"
