= Gymnastics at the 2018 Asian Games – Women's rhythmic individual all-around =

Women's individual all-around at the 2018 Asian Games
- Venue: Jakarta International Expo
- Date: 27–28 August 2018
- Competitors: 29 from 14 nations

Medalists
gold medal	Alina Adilkhanova	Kazakhstan
silver medal	Sabina Tashkenbaeva	Uzbekistan
bronze medal	Zhao Yating	China

The women's rhythmic individual all-around competition at the 2018 Asian Games took place from 27 to 28 August 2018 at the Jakarta International Expo Hall D2.

== Schedule ==
All times are Western Indonesia Time (UTC+07:00)

Date	Time	Event
Monday, 27 August 2018	12:00	Qualification
Tuesday, 28 August 2018	12:00	Final

== Results ==
Legend

- DNF — Did not finish
- DNS — Did not start

=== Qualification ===
Rank	Athlete	Hoop (rhythmic gymnastics)	Ball (rhythmic gymnastics)	Clubs (rhythmic gymnastics)	Ribbon (rhythmic gymnastics)	Total
1	Alina Adilkhanova (KAZ)	17.550	17.550	16.900	~~15.250~~	52.000
2	Sabina Tashkenbaeva (UZB)	16.950	15.750	17.450	~~11.650~~	50.150
3	Nurinisso Usmanova (UZB)	15.850	16.650	16.500	~~12.100~~	49.000
4	Chisaki Oiwa (JPN)	16.450	16.450	15.700	~~12.400~~	48.600
5	Adilya Tlekenova (KAZ)	15.900	16.350	14.200	~~13.700~~	46.450
6	Seo Go-eun (KOR)	16.200	~~14.000~~	15.700	14.450	46.350
7	Dayana Abdirbekova (KAZ)	15.300	15.250	15.600	~~11.850~~	46.150
8	Zhao Yating (CHN)	15.750	15.850	~~13.100~~	13.700	45.300
9	Kim Chae-woon (KOR)	13.800	15.750	15.550	~~13.550~~	45.100
10	Ruriko Shibayama (JPN)	13.750	16.150	14.250		44.150
11	Pak Jin-a (PRK)	14.650	15.150	14.100	~~13.000~~	43.900
12	Uzume Kawasaki (JPN)	13.550	14.850	15.100	~~13.000~~	43.500
13	Shang Rong (CHN)	14.350	14.300	14.850	~~12.350~~	43.500
14	Izzah Amzan (MAS)	14.550	14.450	11.450	~~10.550~~	40.450
15	Koi Sie Yan (MAS)	13.000	13.050	13.650	~~11.000~~	39.700
16	Ri Un-yong (PRK)	12.350	15.000	11.750	~~10.600~~	39.100
17	Agata Bykovskaia (KGZ)	12.950	12.250	13.100	~~9.950~~	38.300
18	Ri Kum-jong (PRK)	10.850	14.250	12.800	~~9.850~~	37.900
19	Amy Kwan (MAS)	12.750	~~12.200~~	12.200	12.250	37.200
20	Aiana Usubalieva (KGZ)	14.050	~~10.000~~	12.050	11.050	37.150
21	Alissa Sadek (LBN)	11.800	12.750	12.350	~~10.800~~	36.900
22	Nabila Evandestiera (INA)	12.450	12.900	11.000	~~9.200~~	36.350
23	Kanpitcha Patanasak (THA)	12.750	10.700	12.150	~~10.350~~	35.600
24	Anna-Marie Ondaatje (SRI)	11.450	12.450	11.700	~~10.350~~	35.600
25	Benjaporn Limpanich (THA)	11.550	11.500	11.550	~~10.850~~	34.600
26	Wahyu Putri (INA)	~~10.250~~	10.700	11.750	11.750	34.200
27	Khashbatyn Undram (MGL)	9.500	12.050	~~9.050~~	10.600	32.150
28	Nicolle Medina (PHI)	8.950	9.550	8.300	~~5.950~~	26.800
29	Shieldannah Sabio (PHI)	9.000	8.000	9.650	~~7.250~~	26.650

=== Final ===
Rank	Athlete	Hoop (rhythmic gymnastics)	Ball (rhythmic gymnastics)	Clubs (rhythmic gymnastics)	Ribbon (rhythmic gymnastics)	Total
1st place, gold medalist(s)	Alina Adilkhanova (KAZ)	17.500	15.900	17.200	16.200	66.800
2nd place, silver medalist(s)	Sabina Tashkenbaeva (UZB)	16.850	16.550	17.550	14.900	65.850
3rd place, bronze medalist(s)	Zhao Yating (CHN)	16.400	16.400	16.750	16.000	65.550
4	Nurinisso Usmanova (UZB)	16.800	17.050	16.250	15.300	65.400
5	Shang Rong (CHN)	15.000	15.000	16.200	14.950	61.150
6	Chisaki Oiwa (JPN)	14.500	16.350	16.750	12.600	60.200
7	Ruriko Shibayama (JPN)	16.900	15.850	15.550	10.950	59.250
8	Kim Chae-woon (KOR)	13.350	15.450	16.150	13.800	58.750
9	Adilya Tlekenova (KAZ)	14.800	12.200	15.850	14.400	57.250
10	Izzah Amzan (MAS)	13.150	14.650	13.150	13.650	54.600
11	Pak Jin-a (PRK)	11.050	14.800	14.900	13.700	54.450
12	Koi Sie Yan (MAS)	13.150	14.200	13.250	12.950	53.550
13	Ri Un-yong (PRK)	13.300	14.300	13.750	11.650	53.000
14	Seo Go-eun (KOR)	13.700	13.850	11.300	12.200	51.050
15	Nabila Evandestiera (INA)	11.050	11.400	12.850	11.200	46.500
16	Wahyu Putri (INA)	10.200	11.450	12.200	10.850	44.700
17	Agata Bykovskaia (KGZ)	10.550	12.400	12.200	9.550	44.700
18	Aiana Usubalieva (KGZ)	10.500	13.300	11.150	9.000	43.950
19	Kanpitcha Patanasak (THA)	9.850	10.700	12.000	11.200	43.750
20	Khashbatyn Undram (MGL)	11.900	11.500	11.350	7.900	42.650
21	Alissa Sadek (LBN)	9.400	10.600	9.100	11.650	40.750
22	Benjaporn Limpanich (THA)	9.950	9.150	10.600	10.300	40.000
23	Nicolle Medina (PHI)	10.750	9.200	8.450	8.750	37.150
—	Shieldannah Sabio (PHI)	DNS	7.200	7.100	7.000	DNF
