= Ekaterina Fetisova =

Uzbekistani rhythmic gymnast

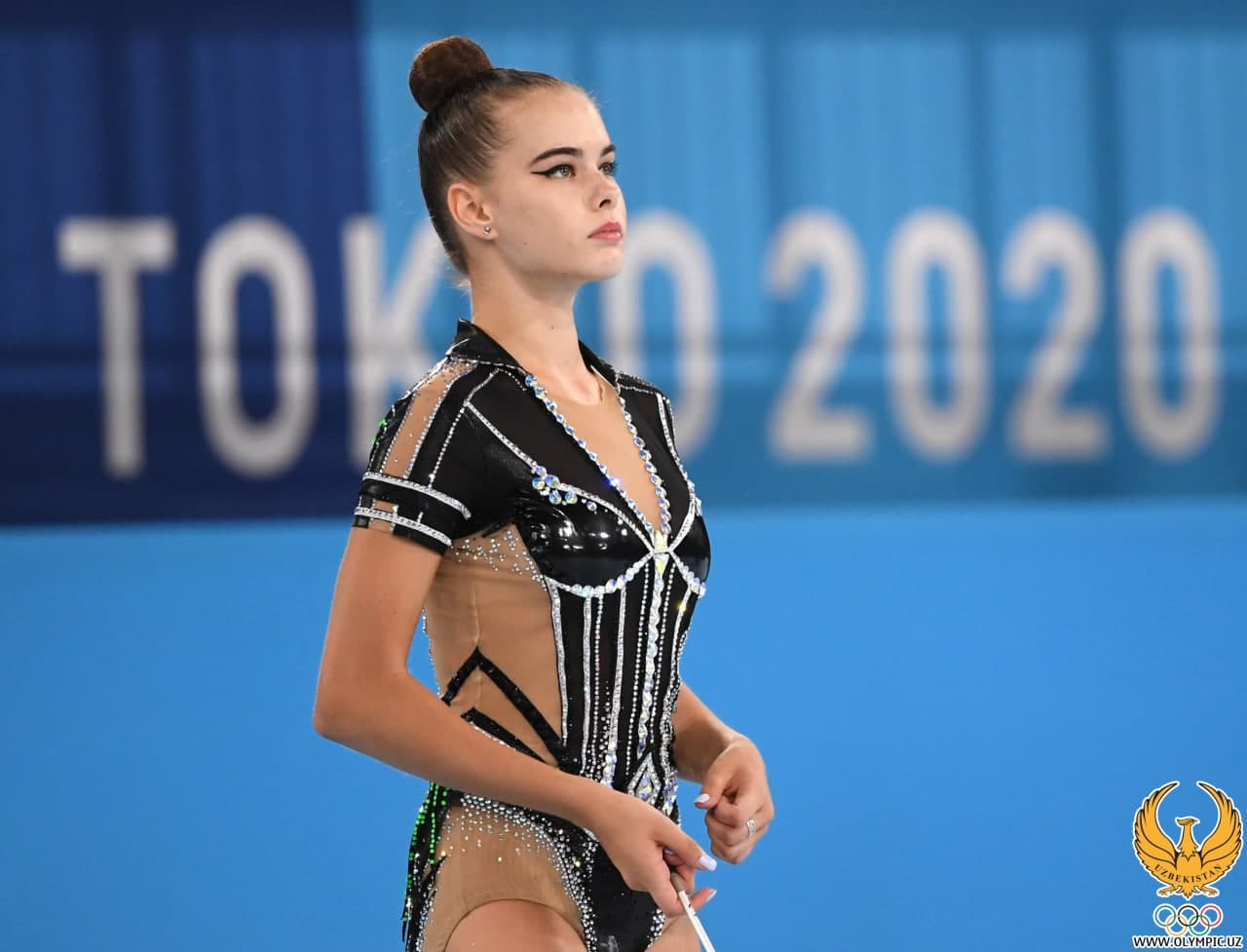
- Fetisova at the 2020 Summer Olympics

Personal information
- Full name: Ekaterina Andreevna Fetisova
- Alternative name: Yekaterina Fetisova
- Born: 3 January 2003 (age 23) Fergana, Uzbekistan
- Height: 172 cm (5 ft 8 in)

Gymnastics career
- Discipline: Rhythmic gymnastics
- Country represented: Uzbekistan (2018 - present)
- Head coach: Liliya Vlasova
Medal record
Representing Uzbekistan
Rhythmic gymnastics
Asian Championships
Gold medal – first place	2019 Pattaya	Team
Gold medal – first place	2021 Tashkent	Ball
Gold medal – first place	2023 Manila	Team
Silver medal – second place	2023 Manila	Group All-around
Silver medal – second place	2023 Manila	3 Ribbons + 2 Balls
Bronze medal – third place	2019 Pattaya	Hoop
Bronze medal – third place	2021 Tashkent	All-around

Ekaterina Andreevna Fetisova (born 3 January 2003) is an Uzbekistani rhythmic gymnast. She is the 2021 Asian Championships ball champion and all-around bronze medalist. She also won team gold and hoop bronze at the 2019 Asian Championships. She represented Uzbekistan at the 2018 Summer Youth Olympics and at the 2020 Summer Olympics. She is the 2018 Asian junior all-around champion.

== Career ==
Fetisova began rhythmic gymnastics in 2008.

=== Junior ===
Fetisova competed at the 2018 Asian Championships in Kuala Lumpur and won the all-around gold medal in the junior division. She then represented Uzbekistan at the 2018 Summer Youth Olympics in Buenos Aires, Argentina and finished in twentieth place during the qualification round for the all-around. She also finished tenth in the mixed multi-discipline team event.

=== Senior ===
Fetisova became age-eligible for senior competition in 2019. She made her senior debut at the 2019 Pesaro World Cup where she finished forty-fifth in the all-around. She then finished sixteenth all-around at the Tashkent World Cup and thirty-seventh at the Baku World Cup. At the 2019 Asian Rhythmic Gymnastics Championships held in Pattaya, Thailand, she won the gold medal in the team event alongside Sabina Tashkenbaeva and Nurinisso Usmanova and the bronze medal in the hoop final behind Zhao Yating and Adilya Tlekenova. In September, she competed at the Kazan World Cup and made her first World Cup final- placing seventh in hoop. At the 2019 World Championships in Baku, Azerbaijan she qualified for the individual all-around final, where she placed twentieth with a total score of 77.250. She also helped Uzbekistan place tenth in the team competition.

Fetisova qualified for the ball final at the 2021 Sofia World Cup and finished seventh. Then at the Tashkent World Cup, she placed eighth in the hoop final. At the 2021 Asian Championships in Tashkent, Fetisova won the all-around bronze medal behind Kazakhstan's Alina Adilkhanova and teammate Takhmina Ikromova. She won the gold medal in the ball event final ahead of Adilkhanova.

Fetisova was initially the reserve for the 2020 Olympic Games due to her all-around placement at the 2019 World Championships. However, when teammate Sabina Tashkenbaeva tested positive for COVID-19 a few days before the competition, Fetisova received her spot. At the 2020 Olympic Games in Tokyo, she finished twenty-fourth in the qualification round for the individual all-around with a total score of 75.500.

Fetisova represented Uzbekistan at the 2022 World Games in Birmingham, United States but did not qualify for any of the event finals.

As of 2023, she is competing as a group gymnast with the Uzbekistani group.
