= Gymnastics at the 2018 Summer Youth Olympics – Girls' rhythmic individual all-around =

Girls' rhythmic individual all-around at the III Summer Youth Olympic Games
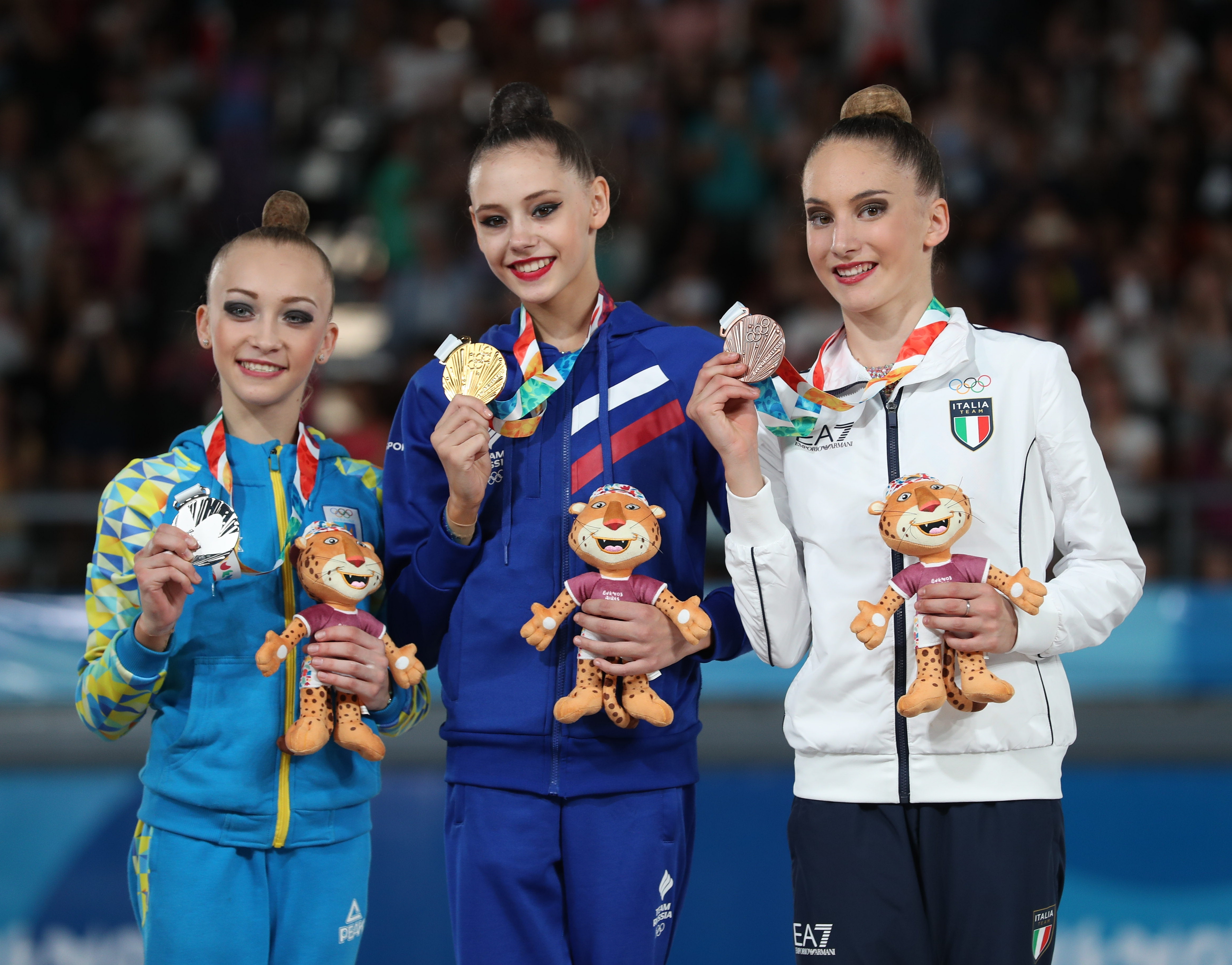
- Venue: America Pavilion
- Dates: 9, 10 and 16 October
- Competitors: 36 from 36 nations

Medalists
1st place, gold medalist(s)		Daria Trubnikova	Russia
2nd place, silver medalist(s)		Khrystyna Pohranychna	Ukraine
3rd place, bronze medalist(s)		Talisa Torretti	Italy

These are the results for the girls' rhythmic individual all-around event at the 2018 Summer Youth Olympics.

== Schedule ==
All times are local (UTC−3).

Date	Time	Round
Tuesday, 9 October	14:05	Qualification: Subdivision 1 – Rotation 1
Tuesday, 9 October	19:05	Qualification: Subdivision 1 – Rotation 2
Wednesday, 10 October	14:03	Qualification: Subdivision 2 – Rotation 1
Wednesday, 10 October	19:03	Qualification: Subdivision 2 – Rotation 2
Tuesday, 16 October	19:00	Final

== Results ==
=== Qualification ===
Rank	Athlete	Nation	Hoop (rhythmic gymnastics)	Ball (rhythmic gymnastics)	Clubs (rhythmic gymnastics)	Ribbon (rhythmic gymnastics)	Total	Notes
1	Daria Trubnikova	Russia	17.900	17.275	17.500	15.900	68.575	Q
2	Talisa Torretti	Italy	16.350	15.650	17.400	15.350	64.750	Q
3	Khrystyna Pohranychna	Ukraine	17.000	15.350	16.450	13.250	62.050	Q
4	Valeriia Sotskova	Israel	16.350	15.150	15.350	14.950	61.800	Q
5	Tatyana Volozhanina	Bulgaria	15.700	15.600	15.450	13.600	60.350	Q
6	Aino Yamada	Japan	14.900	14.850	15.450	14.250	59.450	Q
7	Yulia Vodopyanova	Armenia	16.150	16.000	13.200	14.000	59.350	Q
8	Anna Kamenshchikova	Belarus	16.400	12.800	15.350	12.900	57.450	Q
9	Roza Abitova	Kazakhstan	14.950	15.650	13.800	13.000	57.400	R1
10	Ketevan Arbolishvili	Georgia	14.550	15.750	14.750	12.000	57.050	R2
11	Elizabeth Kapitonova	United States	14.600	14.350	13.150	14.100	56.200	R3
12	Aurora Arvelo	Finland	12.950	15.150	14.500	13.200	55.800	R4
13	Celia Joseph-Noel	France	14.950	14.050	14.400	12.350	55.750	
14	Ioanna Magopoulou	Greece	14.100	15.400	15.450	10.750	55.700	
15	Paula Serrano	Spain	13.950	14.850	15.150	11.600	55.550	
16	Wang Zilu	China	12.900	15.050	14.500	13.050	55.500	
17	Kim Mun-ye	North Korea	15.050	13.300	13.850	13.050	55.250	
18	Adelina Beljajeva	Estonia	14.050	14.250	13.975	12.000	54.275	
19	Rayna Khai Ling Hoh	Malaysia	15.600	12.700	15.050	10.450	53.800	
20	Ekaterina Fetisova	Uzbekistan	13.100	12.500	14.300	13.600	53.500	
21	Natalie Garcia	Canada	13.900	14.200	14.100	11.250	53.450	
22	Yelyzaveta Luzan	Azerbaijan	12.550	13.425	14.000	12.750	52.725	
23	Lidiia Iakovleva	Australia	12.950	13.200	13.550	11.900	51.600	
24	Josephine Juul Møller	Norway	11.800	14.500	12.350	12.350	51.000	
25	Denisa Stoian	Romania	14.400	12.800	10.050	12.500	49.750	
26	Lee So-yun	South Korea	11.350	14.450	12.800	9.850	48.450	
27	Lilly Rotärmel	Germany	13.500	11.650	13.750	9.300	48.200	
28	Anastasia Pingou	Cyprus	10.350	12.800	13.075	11.650	47.875	
29	Celeste D'Arcángelo	Argentina	8.700	14.000	12.050	12.650	47.400	
30	Jennifer Rivera	Colombia	12.050	12.500	11.450	10.650	46.650	
31	Xitlali Santana	Mexico	10.800	12.650	10.900	10.650	45.000	
32	Azra Dewan	South Africa	12.050	12.300	9.400	9.750	43.500	
33	Tia Sobhy	Egypt	11.250	10.650	11.550	10.050	43.500	
34	Maria Eduarda Arakaki	Brazil	9.650	9.750	13.700	8.400	41.500	
35	Antonella Genuzio	Bolivia	12.750	11.800	4.800	7.150	36.500	
36	Lina Wahada	Tunisia	7.300	9.050	7.700	6.300	30.350	

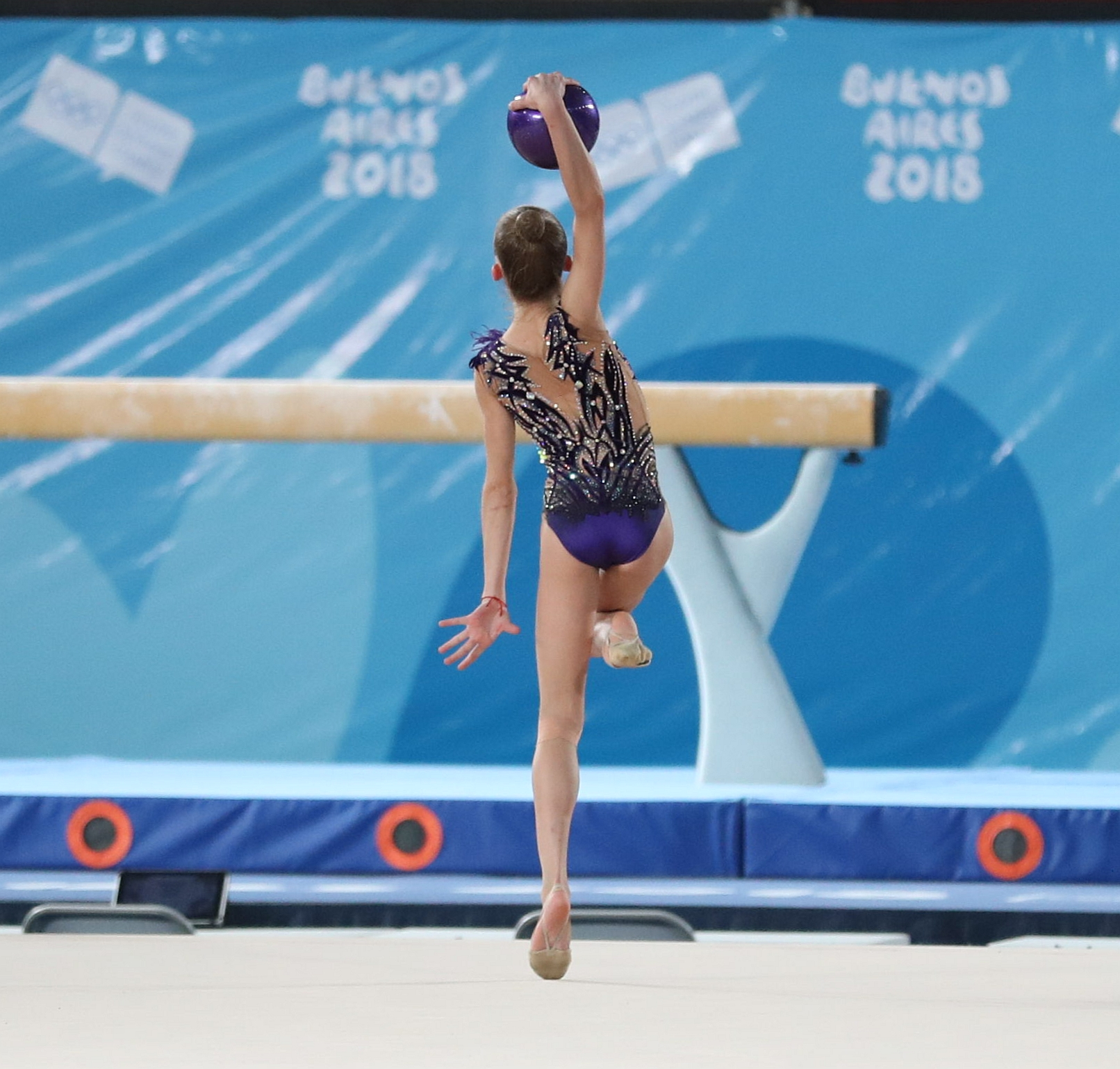
Khrystyna Pohranychna on ball

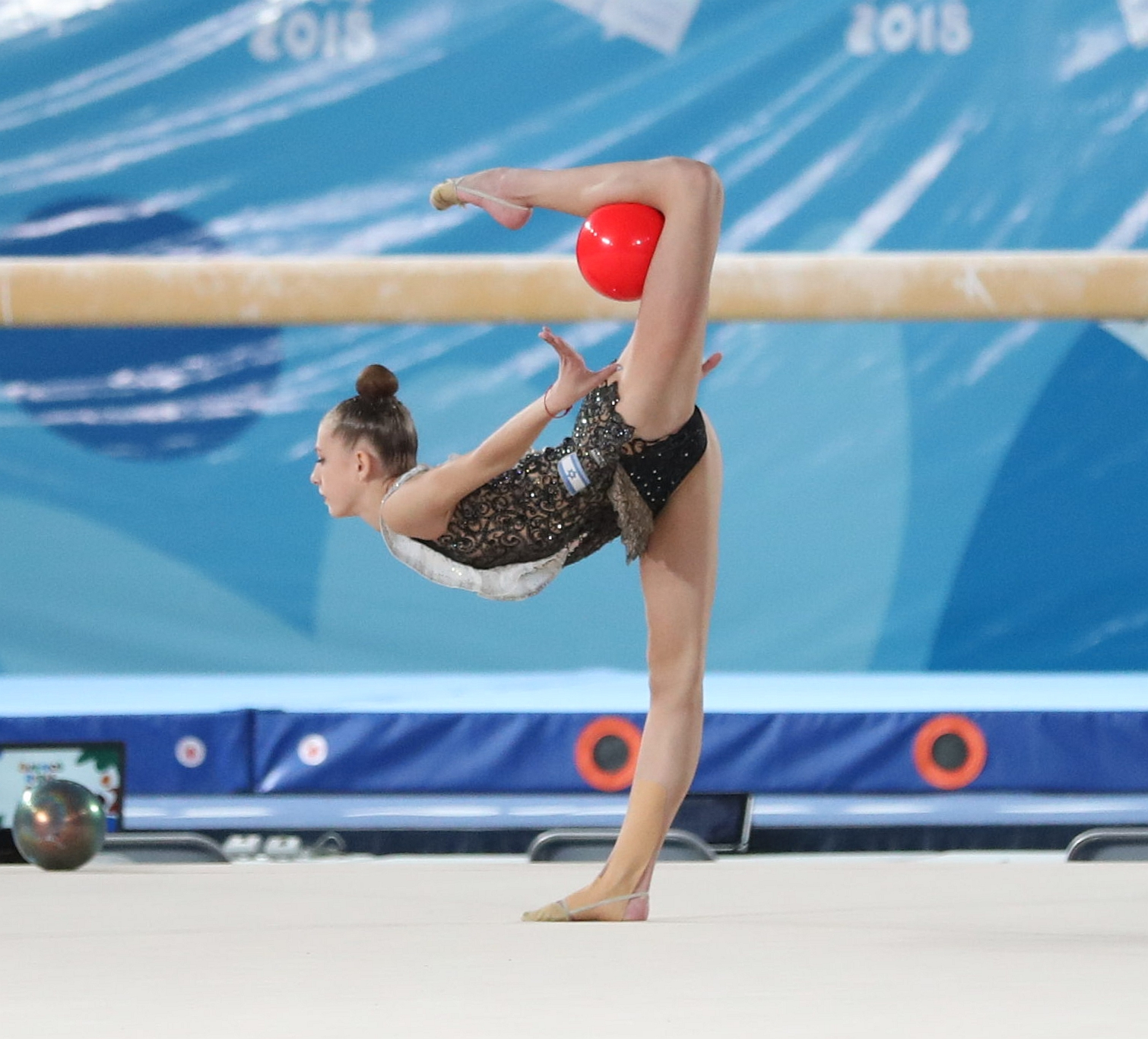
Valeriia Sotskova

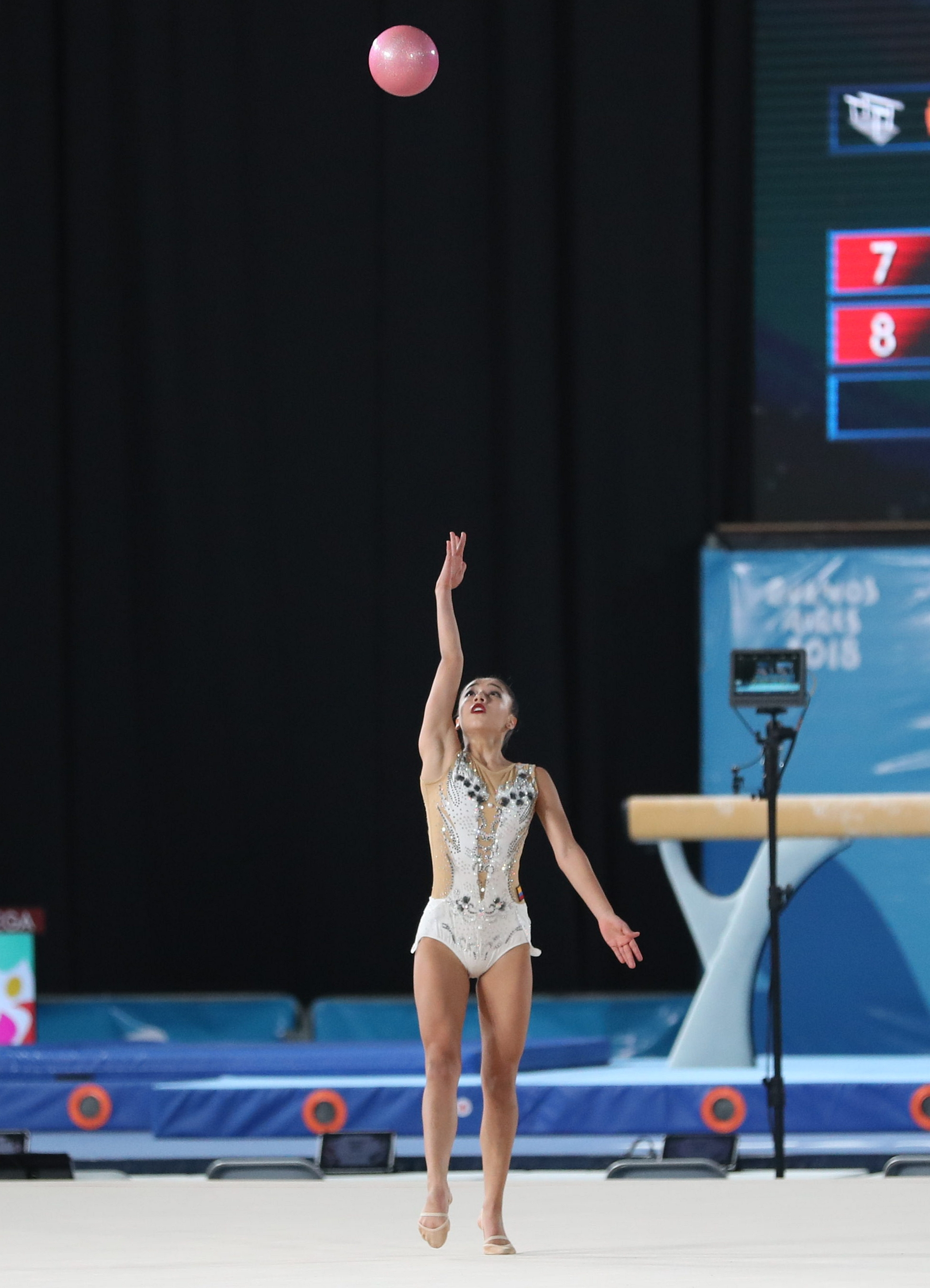
Anna Kamenshchikova

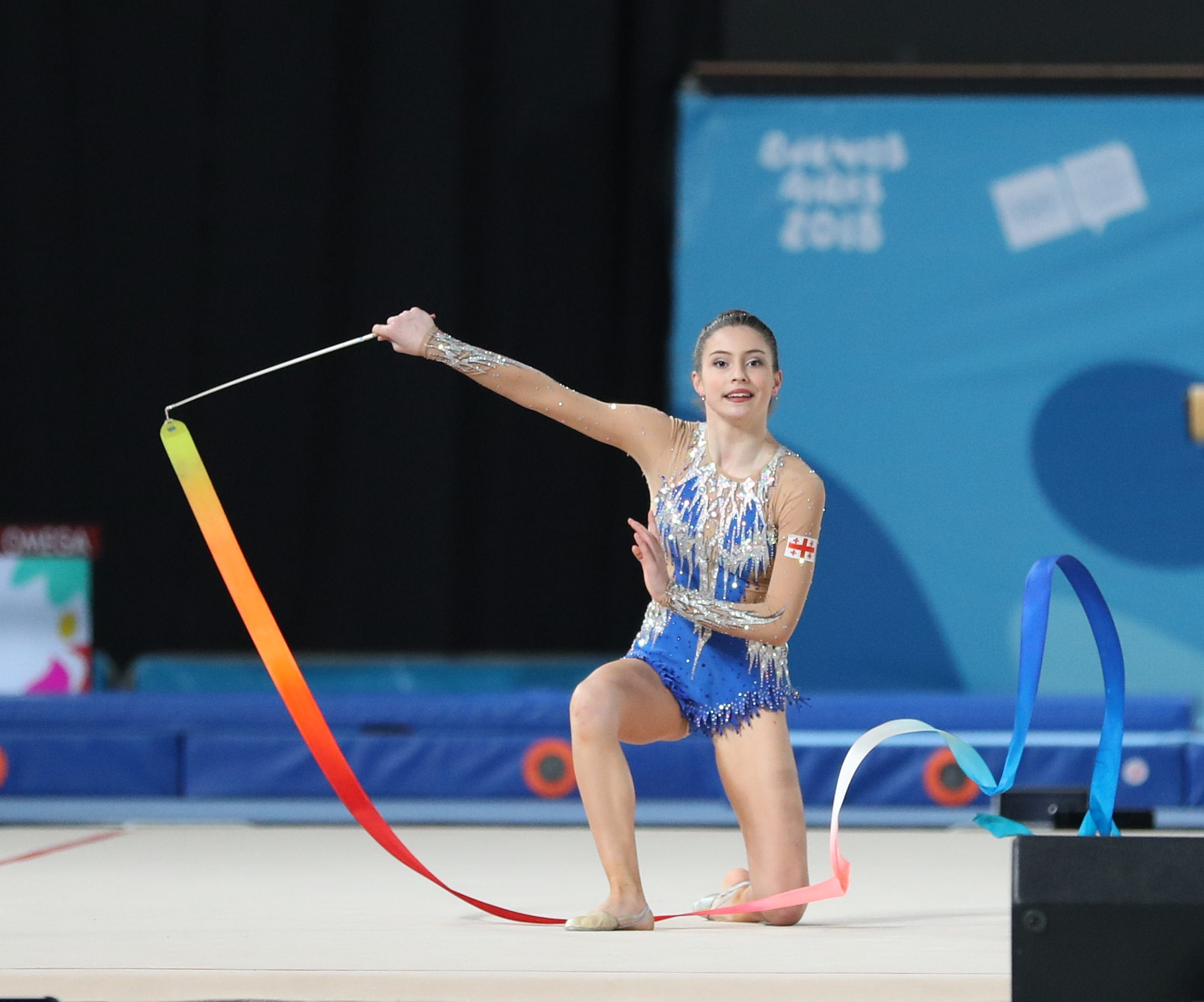
Ketevan Arbolishvili on ribbon

=== Final ===
Rank	Athlete	Nation	Hoop (rhythmic gymnastics)	Ball (rhythmic gymnastics)	Clubs (rhythmic gymnastics)	Ribbon (rhythmic gymnastics)	Total
1st place, gold medalist(s)	Daria Trubnikova	Russia	17.650	17.100	17.900	16.750	69.400
2nd place, silver medalist(s)	Khrystyna Pohranychna	Ukraine	17.750	14.850	16.950	15.550	65.100
3rd place, bronze medalist(s)	Talisa Torretti	Italy	16.850	16.850	16.200	14.750	64.650
4	Anna Kamenshchikova	Belarus	16.450	16.350	16.000	14.800	63.600
5	Tatyana Volozhanina	Bulgaria	16.200	14.800	16.550	14.550	62.100
6	Yulia Vodopyanova	Armenia	15.950	15.000	15.950	14.050	60.950
7	Valeriia Sotskova	Israel	16.150	14.550	15.700	14.400	60.800
8	Aino Yamada	Japan	15.500	15.300	15.000	12.400	58.200

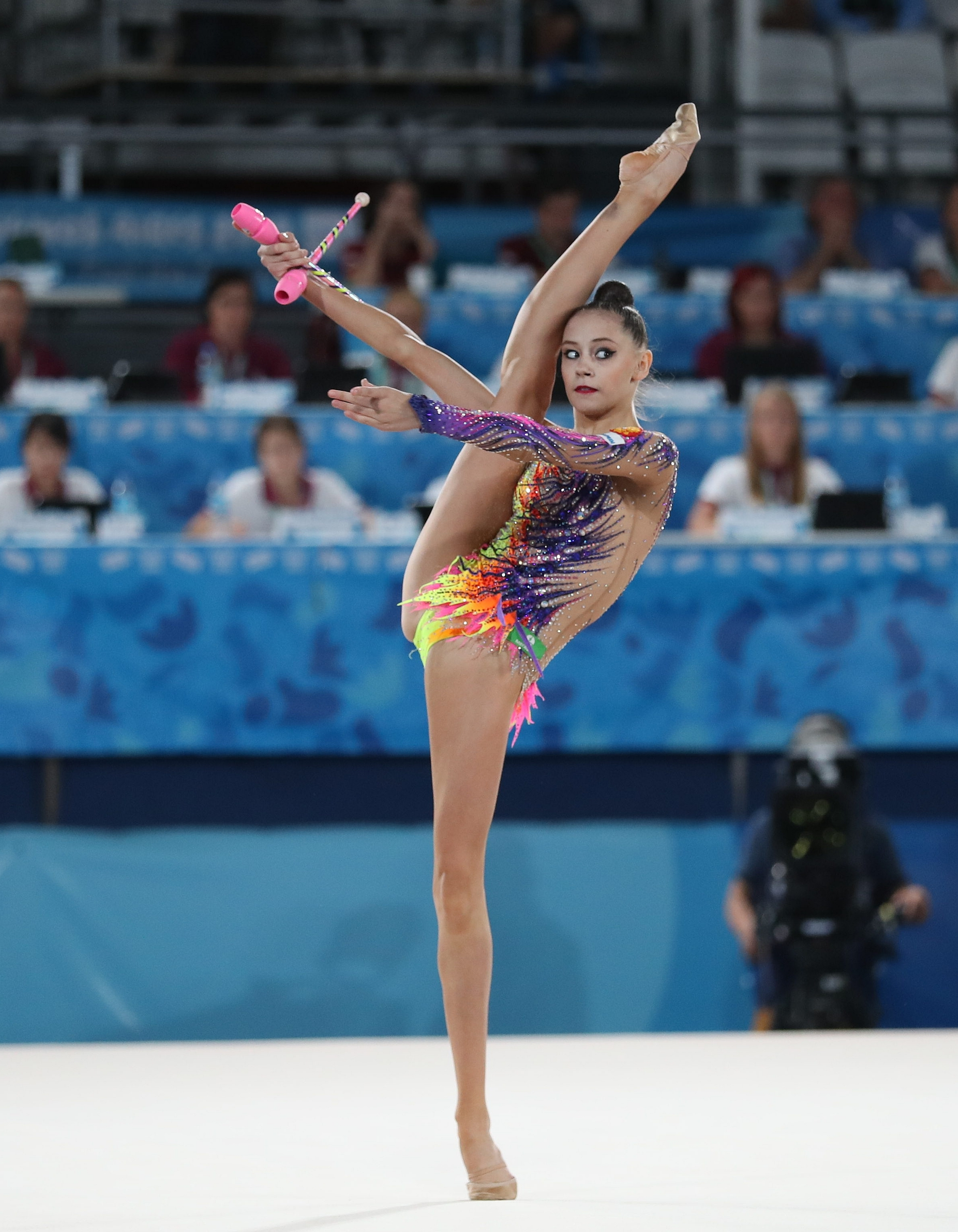
Daria Trubnikova on clubs

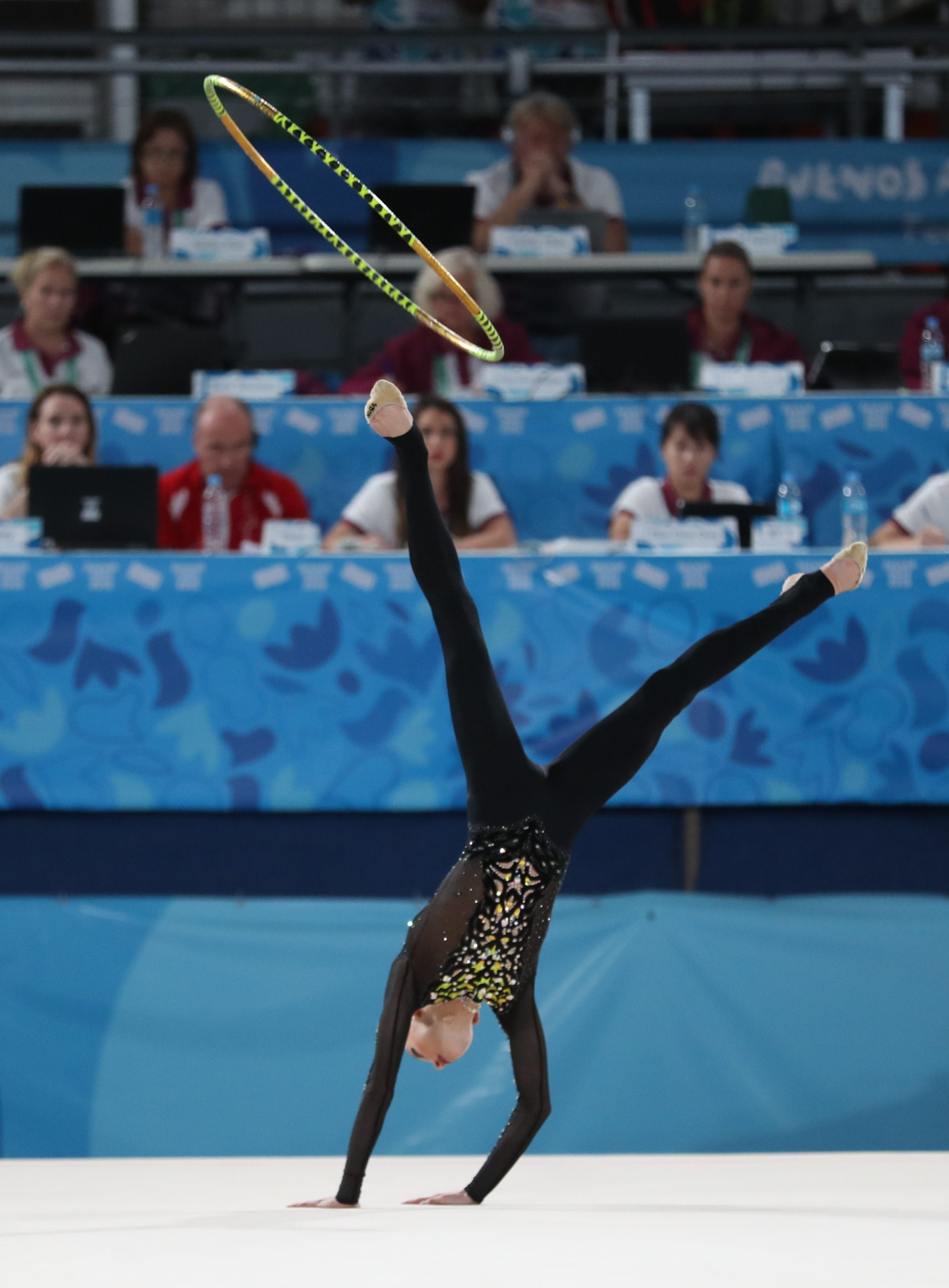
Khrystyna Pohranychna on hoop

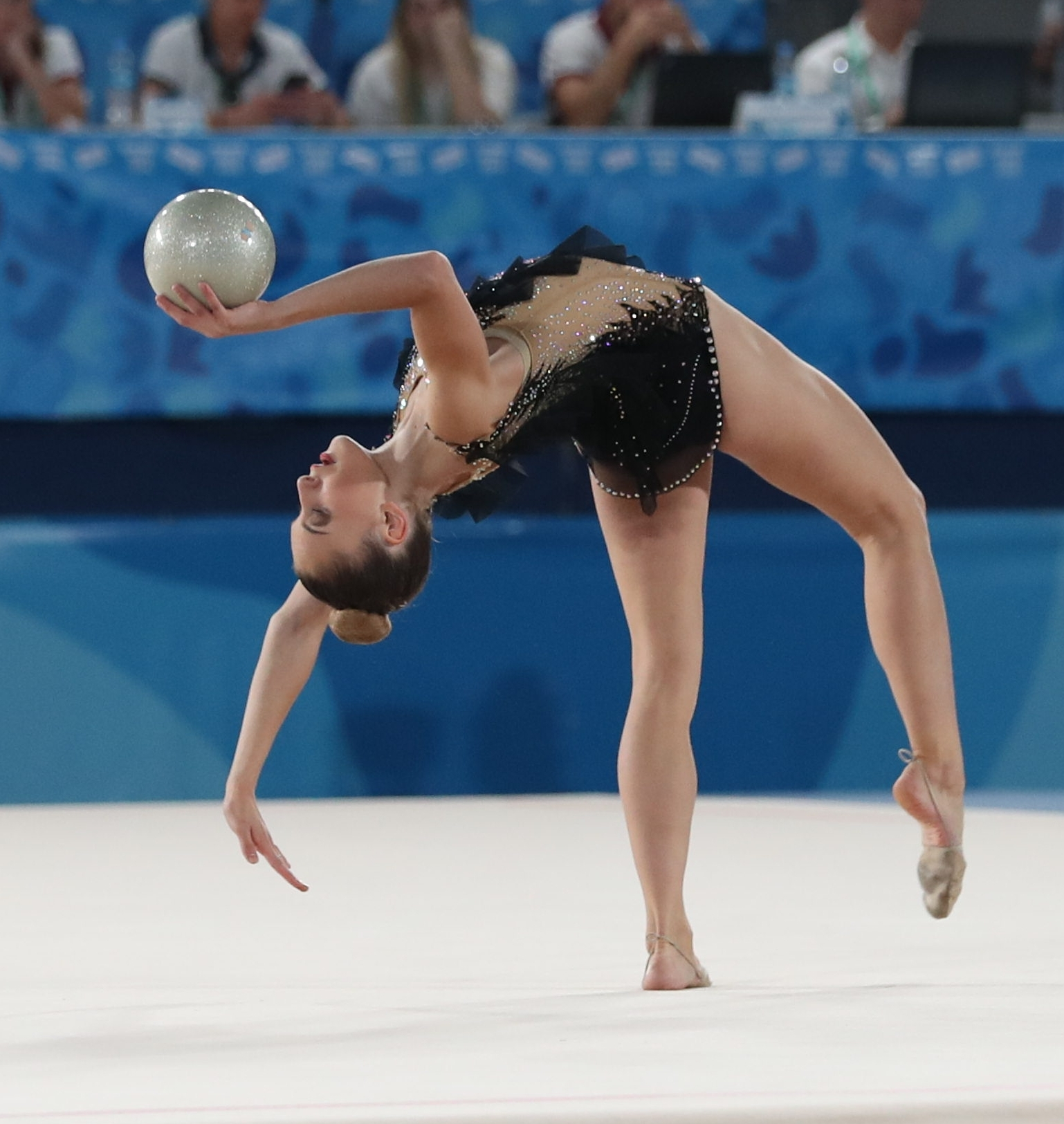
Talisa Torretti on ball
