= Aino Yamada =

Japanese rhythmic gymnast (born 2003)

- 山田 愛乃
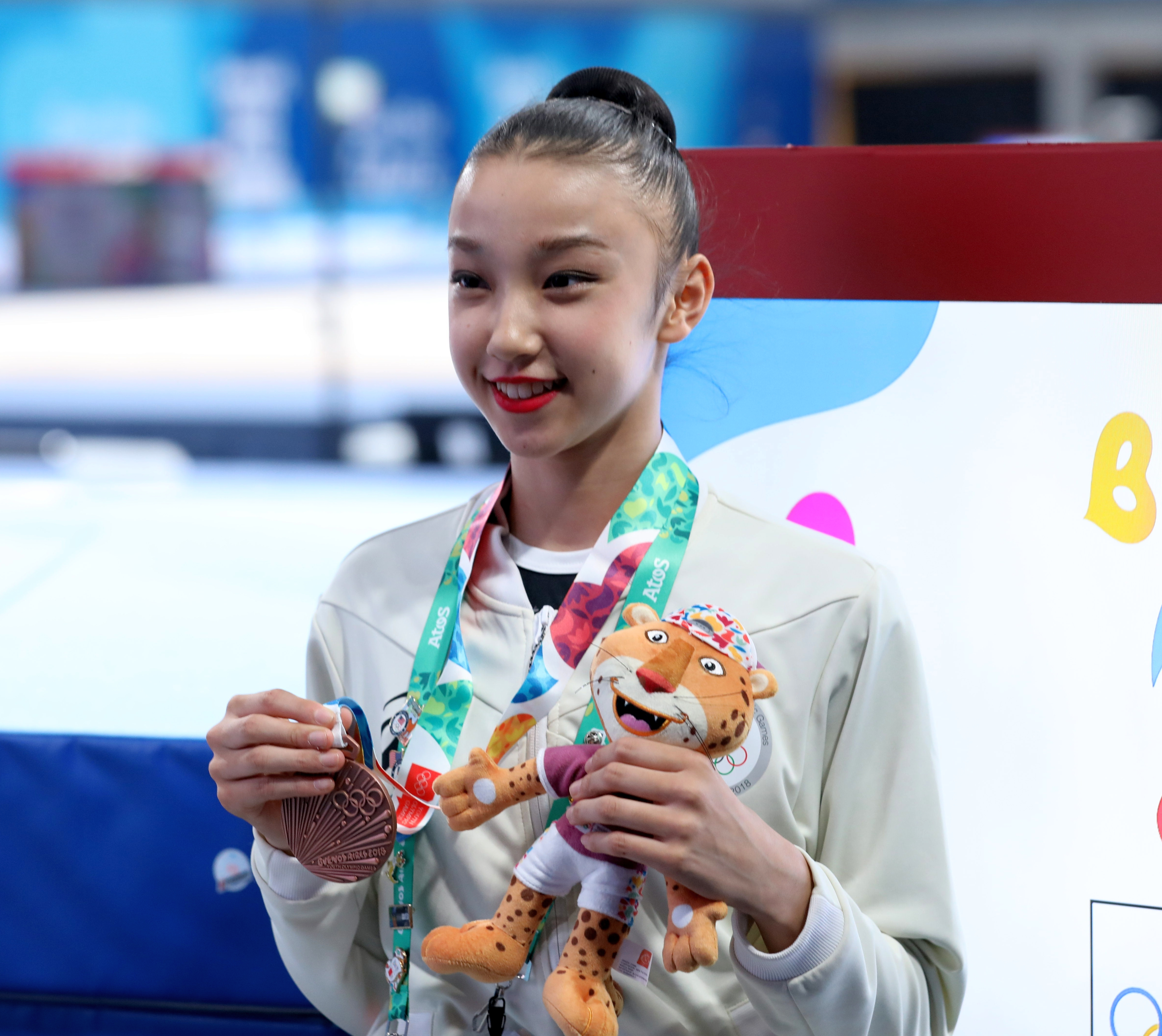

Personal information
- Nickname: Ai-chan
- Born: 10 March 2003 (age 23) Chiba, Japan
- Height: 170 cm (5 ft 7 in)

Gymnastics career
- Discipline: Rhythmic gymnastics
- Country represented: Japan; (2015-)
- College team: Kokushikan University
- Club: Aeon
- Head coaches: Yukari Murata, Rika Yamamoto
Medal record
Representing Japan
Rhythmic Gymnastics
Youth Olympic Games
Bronze medal – third place	2018 Buenos Aires	Mixed team
Asian Championships
Bronze medal – third place	2016 Tashkent	Team
Bronze medal – third place	2017 Astana	Hoop
Bronze medal – third place	2019 Pattaya	Team

Aino Yamada (born 10 March 2003) is a retired Japanese rhythmic gymnast. She represented her country at the 2018 Youth Olympics and is the 2021 national Japanese champion.

== Personal life ==
She took up rhythmic gymnastics because she enjoyed how it allowed her to express herself with her body and how each apparatus had a different character. Outside of the gym she enjoys hot springs and saunas. Her dream was to compete at the Olympic Games, like her idol Melitina Staniouta did, in 2024. She is studying at the Kokushikan University in Tokyo.

== Career ==
=== Junior ===
Yamada debuted at the 2016 Asian Championships in Tashkent, where she won a bronze medal in teams along Sumire Kita, Chisaki Oiwa and Karin Koike.

In 2017 she was again selected for the Asian Championships. She ended 3rd in the all-around and won bronze in the hoop final behind Adilya Tlekenova and Takhmina Ikromova.

She again represented Japan at the Asian Championships in 2018 where, by qualifying in 2nd place in the all-around, she made it into the top 7 that qualified for the 2018 Youth Olympics. In October she took part in the competition in Buenos Aires, where she finished 6th in qualification and 8th in the final. She was a member of the team that won the bronze medal in the mixed team event.

=== Senior ===
Aino became a senior in 2019. At Japanese Nationals at the end of 2021, she won the all-around despite a drop in her ribbon routine, and she also won the hoop, ball, and club finals.

She made her senior international breakthrough in 2022, when she debuted at the World Cup in Sofia. She placed 25th in the all-around, 20th with hoop, 26th with ball, 24th with clubs and 31st with ribbon. Then she competed in Baku ending 32nd in the all-around, 36th with hoop, 29th with ball, 34th with clubs and 24th with ribbon. In August, she took part in the last World Cup of the season in Cluj-Napoca, taking 20th place in the all-around, 26th with hoop, 30th with ball, 12th with clubs and 14th with ribbon. In September, Yamada was selected for her first World Championships in Sofia along with Sumire Kita and the senior group. There she ended 33rd in the All-Around, 31st with hoop, 38th with ball, 46th with clubs, 26th with ribbon.

In 2023, she was 8th at the 2023 Asian Championships, just .100 behind fellow Japanese gymnast Mirano Kita. She qualified for the ball and ribbon finals and placed 8th in both. At the 2023 World Championships, she placed 57th after dropping her apparatus in two of her routines. Her low placement meant that she did not qualify to compete at the 2024 Olympic Games.

She announced her retirement in November 2024.
