= Gymnastics at the 2018 Asian Games – Women's rhythmic team =

Women's team at the 2018 Asian Games
- Venue: Jakarta International Expo
- Date: 27 August 2018
- Competitors: 25 from 7 nations

Medalists
gold medal	Kazakhstan; Dayana Abdirbekova, Alina Adilkhanova, Adilya Tlekenova
silver medal	Uzbekistan; Asal Ikramova, Dildora Rakhmatova, Sabina Tashkenbaeva, Nurinisso Usmanova
bronze medal	South Korea; Kim Chae-woon, Kim Joo-won, Lim Se-eun, Seo Go-eun

The women's rhythmic team competition at the 2018 Asian Games took place on 27 August 2018 at the Jakarta International Expo Hall D2.

== Schedule ==
All times are Western Indonesia Time (UTC+07:00)

Date	Time	Event
Monday, 27 August 2018	12:00	Final

== Results ==
Rank	Team	Hoop (rhythmic gymnastics)	Ball (rhythmic gymnastics)	Clubs (rhythmic gymnastics)	Ribbon (rhythmic gymnastics)	Total
1st place, gold medalist(s)	Kazakhstan (KAZ)	48.750	49.150	46.700	15.250	159.850
	Dayana Abdirbekova	15.300	15.250	15.600	~~11.850~~	
	Alina Adilkhanova	17.550	17.550	16.900	15.250	
	Adilya Tlekenova	15.900	16.350	14.200	~~13.700~~	
2nd place, silver medalist(s)	Uzbekistan (UZB)	45.250	48.250	47.850	13.950	155.300
	Asal Ikramova	12.450		13.900		
	Dildora Rakhmatova		15.850		13.950	
	Sabina Tashkenbaeva	16.950	15.750	17.450	~~11.650~~	
	Nurinisso Usmanova	15.850	16.650	16.500	~~12.100~~	
3rd place, bronze medalist(s)	South Korea (KOR)	45.650	44.650	46.350	14.450	151.100
	Kim Chae-woon	13.800	15.750	15.550	~~13.550~~	
	Kim Joo-won		14.900	15.100		
	Lim Se-eun	15.650			~~12.200~~	
	Seo Go-eun	16.200	14.000	15.700	14.450	
4	Japan (JPN)	43.750	47.450	45.050	13.000	149.250
	Yuka Iida				~~11.350~~	
	Uzume Kawasaki	13.550	14.850	15.100	13.000	
	Chisaki Oiwa	16.450	16.450	15.700	~~12.400~~	
	Ruriko Shibayama	13.750	16.150	14.250		
5	China (CHN)	42.950	44.400	27.950	26.050	141.350
	Kang Qi	12.850			~~12.250~~	
	Shang Rong	14.350	14.300	14.850	12.350	
	Yu Ran		14.250	~~11.850~~		
	Zhao Yating	15.750	15.850	13.100	13.700	
6	North Korea (PRK)	37.850	44.400	38.650	13.000	133.900
	Pak Jin-a	14.650	15.150	14.100	13.000	
	Ri Kum-jong	10.850	14.250	12.800	~~9.850~~	
	Ri Un-yong	12.350	15.000	11.750	~~10.600~~	
7	Malaysia (MAS)	40.300	39.700	37.300	12.250	129.550
	Izzah Amzan	14.550	14.450	11.450	~~10.550~~	
	Koi Sie Yan	13.000	13.050	13.650	~~11.000~~	
	Amy Kwan	12.750	12.200	12.200	12.250	
