= Gymnastics at the 2018 Summer Youth Olympics – Mixed multi-discipline team =

Mixed multi-discipline team at the III Summer Youth Olympic Games
- Venue: America Pavilion
- Date: 7–10 October
- Competitors: 154 from 62 nations
- Winning total: 293

Medalists
1st place, gold medalist(s)		Mariela Kostadinova; Panayot Dimitrov; Ruan Lange; Krisztián Balázs; Nazar Chepurnyi; Tamara Ong; Phạm Như Phương; Alba Petisco; Talisa Torretti; Daria Trubnikova; Yelizaveta Luzan; Liam Christie; Fan Xinyi	Mixed-NOCs
2nd place, silver medalist(s)		Madalena Cavilhas; Manuel Candeias; Fernando Espíndola; Takeru Kitazono; Pablo Calvache; Camila Montoya; Kseniia Klimenko; Zeina Ibrahim; Rayna Hoh; Roza Abitova; Adelina Beljajeva; Robert Vilarasau; Jessica Clarke	Mixed-NOCs
3rd place, bronze medalist(s)		Viktoryia Akhotnikava; Ilya Famenkou; Brandon Briones; Adam Tobin; Mohamed Afify; Indira Ulmasova; Karla Pérez; Tonya Paulsson; Lidiia Iakovleva; Aino Yamada; Lilly Rotärmel; Santiago Escallier; Antonia Sakellaridou	Mixed-NOCs

The mixed multi-discipline team event at the 2018 Summer Youth Olympics was held at the America Pavilion from 7 to 10 October.

== Results ==
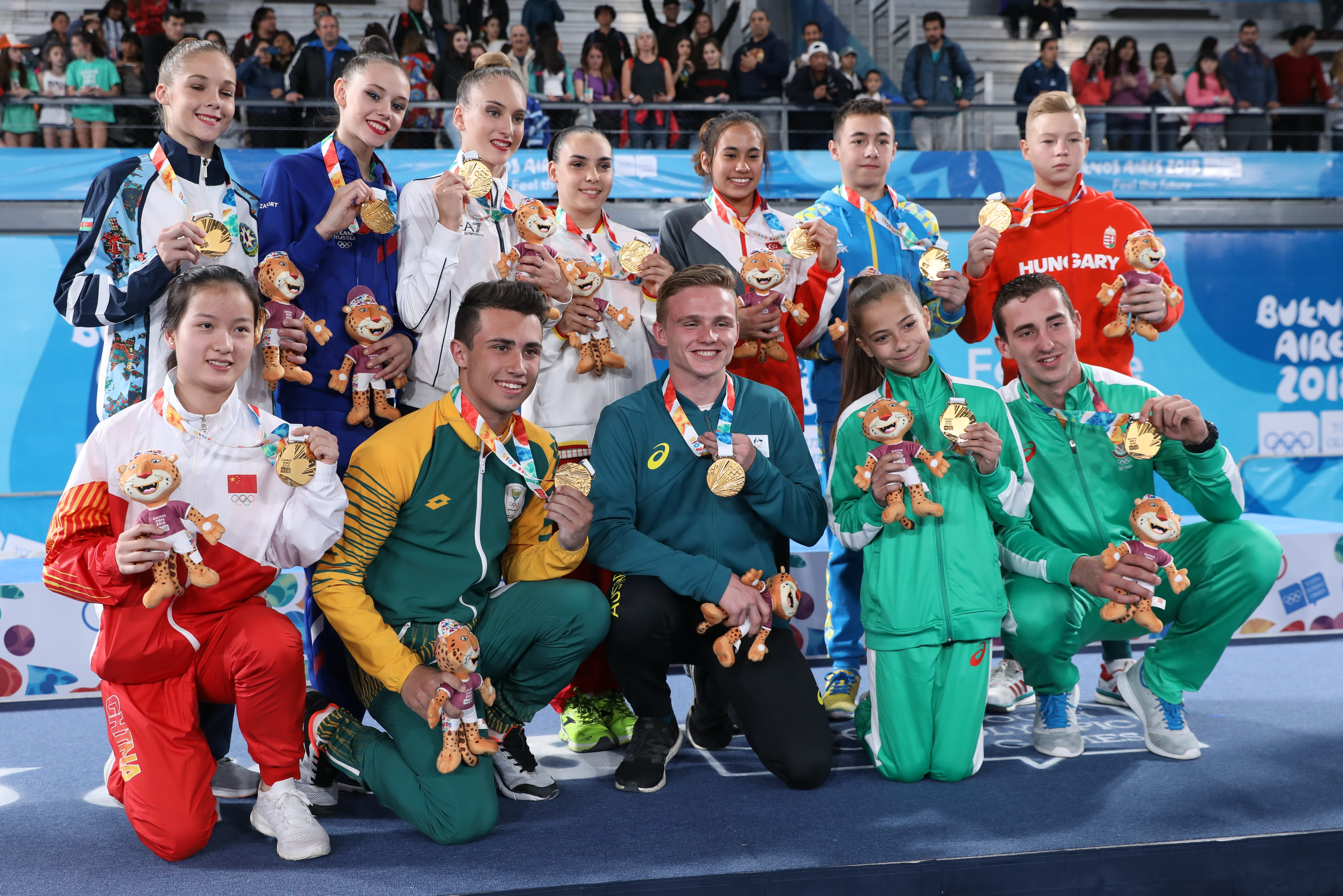
(gold) Team Simone Biles

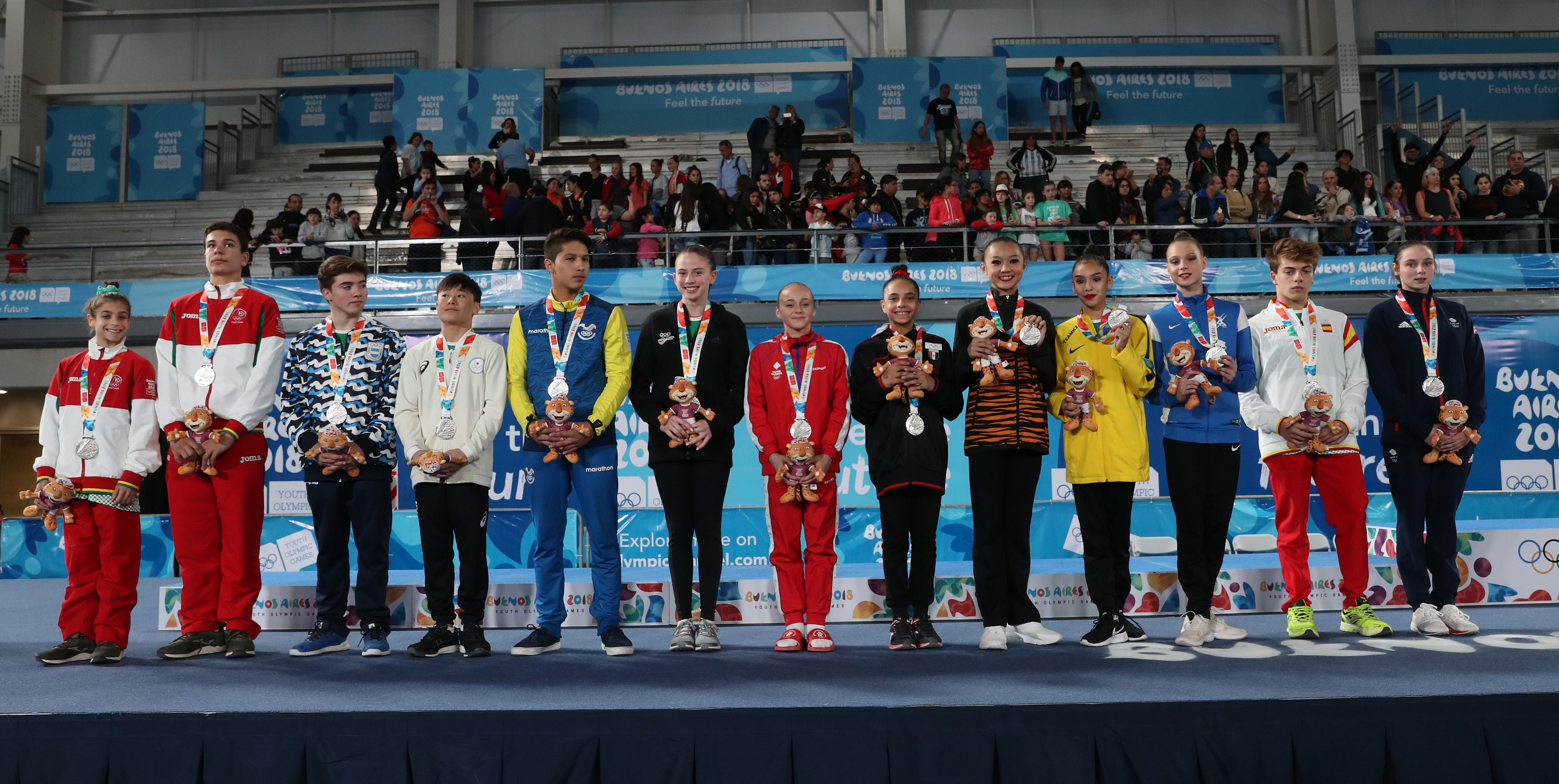
(silver) Team Max Whitlock

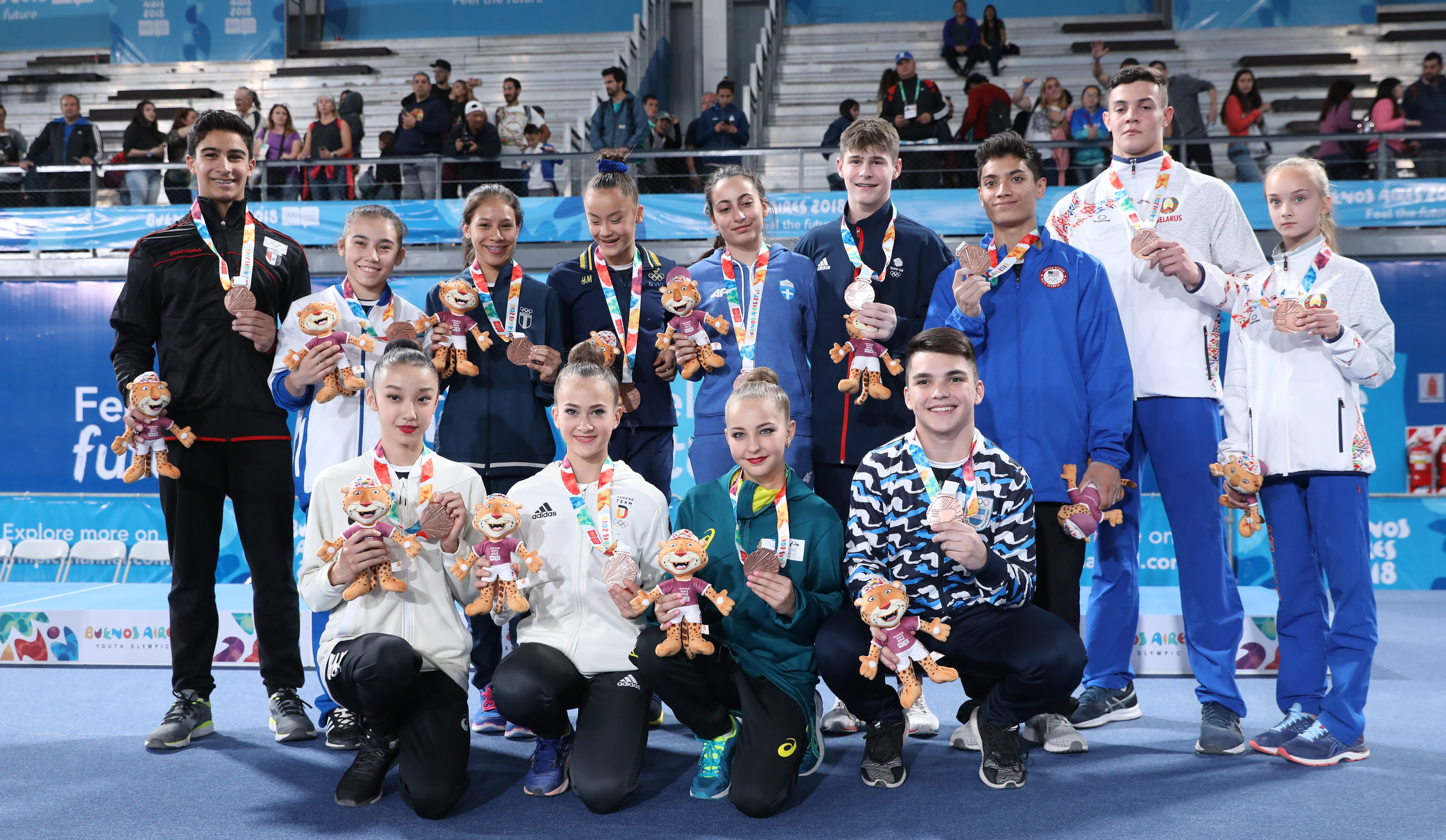
(bronze) Team Oksana Chusovitina

Mixed multi-discipline team medalists

Rank	Team	Athlete	Acrobatic			Artistic								Rhythmic				Trampoline		Total points
Rank	Team	Athlete	D	B	C	Floor (gymnastics)	Pommel horse	Rings (gymnastics)	Vault (gymnastics)	Parallel bars	Horizontal bar	Uneven bars	Balance beam	Hoop (rhythmic gymnastics)	Ball (rhythmic gymnastics)	Clubs (rhythmic gymnastics)	Ribbon (rhythmic gymnastics)	R1	R2	Total points
1st place, gold medalist(s)	Simone; Biles (Orange)	Mariela Kostadinova (BUL); Panayot Dimitrov (BUL)	5	4	1															293
1st place, gold medalist(s)	Simone; Biles (Orange)	Ruan Lange (RSA)				–	–	–	17	–	–									293
1st place, gold medalist(s)	Simone; Biles (Orange)	Krisztián Balázs (HUN)				6	10	11	–	5	2									293
1st place, gold medalist(s)	Simone; Biles (Orange)	Nazar Chepurnyi (UKR)				5	11	18	19	3	14									293
1st place, gold medalist(s)	Simone; Biles (Orange)	Tamara Ong (SGP)				17			–			–	21							293
1st place, gold medalist(s)	Simone; Biles (Orange)	Phạm Như Phương (VIE)				11			20			17	–							293
1st place, gold medalist(s)	Simone; Biles (Orange)	Alba Petisco (ESP)				–			7			14	19							293
1st place, gold medalist(s)	Simone; Biles (Orange)	Talisa Torretti (ITA)												4	5	2	2			293
1st place, gold medalist(s)	Simone; Biles (Orange)	Daria Trubnikova (RUS)												1	1	1	1			293
1st place, gold medalist(s)	Simone; Biles (Orange)	Yelyzaveta Luzan (AZE)												–	–	–	–			293
1st place, gold medalist(s)	Simone; Biles (Orange)	Liam Christie (AUS)																9	8	293
1st place, gold medalist(s)	Simone; Biles (Orange)	Fan Xinyi (CHN)																1	1	293
2nd place, silver medalist(s)	Max; Whitlock (Green)	Madalena Cavilhas (POR); Manuel Candeias (POR)	8	7	5															349
2nd place, silver medalist(s)	Max; Whitlock (Green)	Fernando Espíndola (ARG)				–	23	–	–	20	–									349
2nd place, silver medalist(s)	Max; Whitlock (Green)	Takeru Kitazono (JPN)				7	1	1	6	1	1									349
2nd place, silver medalist(s)	Max; Whitlock (Green)	Pablo Calvache (ECU)				22	–	16	10	–	11									349
2nd place, silver medalist(s)	Max; Whitlock (Green)	Camila Montoya (CRC)				15			21			18	15							349
2nd place, silver medalist(s)	Max; Whitlock (Green)	Ksenia Klimenko (RUS)				3			–			5	3							349
2nd place, silver medalist(s)	Max; Whitlock (Green)	Zeina Ibrahim (EGY)				–			15			–	–							349
2nd place, silver medalist(s)	Max; Whitlock (Green)	Rayna Hoh (MAS)												8	–	10	–			349
2nd place, silver medalist(s)	Max; Whitlock (Green)	Roza Abitova (KAZ)												11	4	–	11			349
2nd place, silver medalist(s)	Max; Whitlock (Green)	Adelina Beljajeva (EST)												–	16	15	16			349
2nd place, silver medalist(s)	Max; Whitlock (Green)	Robert Vilarasau (ESP)																7	4	349
2nd place, silver medalist(s)	Max; Whitlock (Green)	Jessica Clarke (GBR)																7	6	349
3rd place, bronze medalist(s)	Oksana; Chusovitina (Black)	Viktoryia Akhotnikava (BLR); Ilya Famenkou (BLR)	2	8	2															352
3rd place, bronze medalist(s)	Oksana; Chusovitina (Black)	Brandon Briones (USA)				1	9	2	4	10	6									352
3rd place, bronze medalist(s)	Oksana; Chusovitina (Black)	Adam Tobin (GBR)				3	6	5	14	7	10									352
3rd place, bronze medalist(s)	Oksana; Chusovitina (Black)	Mohamed Afify (EGY)				–	–	–	–	–	–									352
3rd place, bronze medalist(s)	Oksana; Chusovitina (Black)	Indira Ulmasova (UZB)				16			12			24	–							352
3rd place, bronze medalist(s)	Oksana; Chusovitina (Black)	Karla Pérez (GUA)				21			–			–	14							352
3rd place, bronze medalist(s)	Oksana; Chusovitina (Black)	Tonya Paulsson (SWE)				–			18			8	12							352
3rd place, bronze medalist(s)	Oksana; Chusovitina (Black)	Lidiia Iakovleva (AUS)												–	18	–	17			352
3rd place, bronze medalist(s)	Oksana; Chusovitina (Black)	Aino Yamada (JPN)												12	11	4	4			352
3rd place, bronze medalist(s)	Oksana; Chusovitina (Black)	Lilly Rotärmel (GER)												17	–	17	–			352
3rd place, bronze medalist(s)	Oksana; Chusovitina (Black)	Santiago Escallier (ARG)																12	9	352
3rd place, bronze medalist(s)	Oksana; Chusovitina (Black)	Antonia Sakellaridou (GRE)																10	7	352
4	Anna; Bessonova (Gray)	Sophia Imrie-Gale (GBR); Clyde Gembickas (GBR)	6	3	6															381
4	Anna; Bessonova (Gray)	Ward Claeys (BEL)				20	–	23	22	16	18									381
4	Anna; Bessonova (Gray)	Reza Bohloulzade Hajlari (IRI)				18	5	–	23	–	19									381
4	Anna; Bessonova (Gray)	Ayan Moldagaliyev (KAZ)				–	8	22	–	6	–									381
4	Anna; Bessonova (Gray)	Eglė Stalinkevičiūtė (LTU)				12			14			16	–							381
4	Anna; Bessonova (Gray)	Ada Hautala (FIN)				–			–			–	10							381
4	Anna; Bessonova (Gray)	Giorgia Villa (ITA)				2			1			1	7							381
4	Anna; Bessonova (Gray)	Célia Joseph-Noël (FRA)												10	17	13	–			381
4	Anna; Bessonova (Gray)	Celeste D'Arcángelo (ARG)												–	–	–	13			381
4	Anna; Bessonova (Gray)	Tatyana Volozhanina (BUL)												7	6	5	8			381
4	Anna; Bessonova (Gray)	Jérémy Chartier (CAN)																4	11	381
4	Anna; Bessonova (Gray)	Vera Beliankina (RUS)																2	7	381
Rank	Team	Athlete	Acrobatic			Artistic								Rhythmic				Trampoline		Total points
Rank	Team	Athlete	D	B	C	Floor (gymnastics)	Pommel horse	Rings (gymnastics)	Vault (gymnastics)	Parallel bars	Horizontal bar	Uneven bars	Balance beam	Hoop (rhythmic gymnastics)	Ball (rhythmic gymnastics)	Clubs (rhythmic gymnastics)	Ribbon (rhythmic gymnastics)	R1	R2	Total points
5	Dong Dong (Purple)	Rachel Nell (RSA); Sidwell Madibeng (RSA)	11	11	11															389
5	Dong Dong (Purple)	Daniel Schwed (GER)				8	4	–	16	22	13									389
5	Dong Dong (Purple)	Marcus Stenberg (SWE)				12	–	15	–	–	–									389
5	Dong Dong (Purple)	Diogo Soares (BRA)				–	7	7	8	9	3									389
5	Dong Dong (Purple)	Beatriz Cardoso (POR)				22			11			–	–							389
5	Dong Dong (Purple)	Ana Maria Puiu (ROU)				–			17			19	6							389
5	Dong Dong (Purple)	Lee Yun-seo (KOR)				20			–			6	20							389
5	Dong Dong (Purple)	Aurora Arvelo (FIN)												19	9	–	10			389
5	Dong Dong (Purple)	Khrystyna Pohranychna (UKR)												2	8	3	9			389
5	Dong Dong (Purple)	Wang Zilu (CHN)												–	–	12	–			389
5	Dong Dong (Purple)	Nikita Babyonishev (UZB)																10	6	389
5	Dong Dong (Purple)	Yekaterina Lukina (KAZ)																11	12	389
6	Alina; Kabaeva (White)	Kapitolina Khusnullina (RUS); Anatolii Slivkov (RUS)	3	6	8															397
6	Alina; Kabaeva (White)	Jacob Karlsen (NOR)				13	17	10	2	23	16									397
6	Alina; Kabaeva (White)	Samad Mammadli (AZE)				–	20	–	–	14	15									397
6	Alina; Kabaeva (White)	Yeh Cheng (TPE)				16	–	20	9	–	–									397
6	Alina; Kabaeva (White)	Paulina Vargas (MEX)				10			24			13	–							397
6	Alina; Kabaeva (White)	Laura Leonardo (BRA)				–			–			15	16							397
6	Alina; Kabaeva (White)	Chiharu Yamada (JPN)				6			10			–	18							397
6	Alina; Kabaeva (White)	Elizabeth Kapitonova (USA)												–	15	–	5			397
6	Alina; Kabaeva (White)	Kim Mun-ye (PRK)												9	–	16	–			397
6	Alina; Kabaeva (White)	Yulia Vodopyanova (ARM)												6	2	19	6			397
6	Alina; Kabaeva (White)	Ruben Tavares (POR)																2	3	397
6	Alina; Kabaeva (White)	Marina Chavarria (ESP)																6	4	397
7	Yang Wei (Red)	Liu Yiqian (CHN); Li Zhengyang (CHN)	9	9	9															403
7	Yang Wei (Red)	Félix Dolci (CAN)				9	12	4	3	21	5									403
7	Yang Wei (Red)	Martin Guðmundsson (ISL)				10	–	–	13	–	–									403
7	Yang Wei (Red)	Bora Tarhan (TUR)				–	15	13	–	18	17									403
7	Yang Wei (Red)	Kryxia Alicea (PUR)				–			–			DNS	–							403
7	Yang Wei (Red)	Aliaksandra Varabyova (BLR)				13			19			23	12							403
7	Yang Wei (Red)	Anastasiia Bachynska (UKR)				1			3			2	2							403
7	Yang Wei (Red)	Maria Arakaki (BRA)												–	–	18	–			403
7	Yang Wei (Red)	Paula Serrano (ESP)												16	12	9	18			403
7	Yang Wei (Red)	Xitlali Santana (MEX)												24	21	–	21			403
7	Yang Wei (Red)	Andrew Stamp (GBR)																5	7	403
7	Yang Wei (Red)	Jessica Pickering (AUS)																8	2	403
8	Kohei; Uchimura (Blue)	Daryna Plokhotniuk (UKR); Oleksandr Madei (UKR)	1	5	4															407
8	Kohei; Uchimura (Blue)	Abdulaziz Mirvaliev (UZB)				16	24	17	15	19	24									407
8	Kohei; Uchimura (Blue)	Michael Torres (PUR)				24	16	21	18	15	23									407
8	Kohei; Uchimura (Blue)	Ondřej Kalný (CZE)				Did not start														407
8	Kohei; Uchimura (Blue)	Amelie Morgan (GBR)				4			4			4	8							407
8	Kohei; Uchimura (Blue)	Tang Xijing (CHN)				5			–			3	1							407
8	Kohei; Uchimura (Blue)	Csenge Bácskay (HUN)				–			5			–	–							407
8	Kohei; Uchimura (Blue)	Josephine Juul Møller (NOR)												–	13	21	–			407
8	Kohei; Uchimura (Blue)	Denisa Stoian (ROU)												14	19	–	14			407
8	Kohei; Uchimura (Blue)	Anna Kamenshchikova (BLR)												3	–	7	12			407
8	Kohei; Uchimura (Blue)	Noureddine-Younes Belkhir (ALG)																11	10	407
8	Kohei; Uchimura (Blue)	Emily Mussmann (SUI)																4	3	407
Rank	Team	Athlete	Acrobatic			Artistic								Rhythmic				Trampoline		Total points
Rank	Team	Athlete	D	B	C	Floor (gymnastics)	Pommel horse	Rings (gymnastics)	Vault (gymnastics)	Parallel bars	Horizontal bar	Uneven bars	Balance beam	Hoop (rhythmic gymnastics)	Ball (rhythmic gymnastics)	Clubs (rhythmic gymnastics)	Ribbon (rhythmic gymnastics)	R1	R2	Total points
9	Nadia; Comăneci (Yellow)	Anastassiya Arkhipova (KAZ); Dmitriy Nemerenko (KAZ)	7	1	7															410
9	Nadia; Comăneci (Yellow)	Uri Zeidel (ISR)				23	–	24	24	12	22									410
9	Nadia; Comăneci (Yellow)	Sergey Naidin (RUS)				2	3	9	11	2	4									410
9	Nadia; Comăneci (Yellow)	Mathys Cordule (FRA)				DNS	21	Did not start												410
9	Nadia; Comăneci (Yellow)	Zarith Imaan Khalid (MAS)				19			–			22	–							410
9	Nadia; Comăneci (Yellow)	Lisa Zimmermann (GER)				9			9			9	9							410
9	Nadia; Comăneci (Yellow)	Milka Dona (SRI)				–			16			–	17							410
9	Nadia; Comăneci (Yellow)	Natalie Garcia (CAN)												–	–	–	19			410
9	Nadia; Comăneci (Yellow)	Ioanna Magopoulou (GRE)												15	7	6	–			410
9	Nadia; Comăneci (Yellow)	Ketevan Arbolishvili (GEO)												13	3	11	15			410
9	Nadia; Comăneci (Yellow)	Takumi Fujimoto (JPN)																8	12	410
9	Nadia; Comăneci (Yellow)	Michelle Mares (MEX)																9	10	410
10	Yevgeny; Marchenko (Brown)	Daniela González (PUR); Adriel González (PUR)	12	12	12															430
10	Yevgeny; Marchenko (Brown)	Byun Seong-won (KOR)				14	–	–	20	–	21									430
10	Yevgeny; Marchenko (Brown)	Lay Giannini (ITA)				4	14	8	11	11	7									430
10	Yevgeny; Marchenko (Brown)	Víctor Betancourt (VEN)				–	22	19	–	13	–									430
10	Yevgeny; Marchenko (Brown)	Kate Sayer (AUS)				7			6			10	13							430
10	Yevgeny; Marchenko (Brown)	Elvira Katsali (GRE)				23			22			21	23							430
10	Yevgeny; Marchenko (Brown)	Valeriia Sotskova (ISR)												5	10	8	3			430
10	Yevgeny; Marchenko (Brown)	Anastasia Pingou (CYP)												–	20	–	–			430
10	Yevgeny; Marchenko (Brown)	Ekaterina Fetisova (UZB)												18	–	14	7			430
10	Yevgeny; Marchenko (Brown)	Fu Fantao (CHN)																6	2	430
10	Yevgeny; Marchenko (Brown)	Alyssa Oh (USA)																3	9	430
11	Rosie; MacLennan (Light Blue)	Noa Kazado Yakar (ISR); Yonatan Fridman (ISR)	4	2	3															441
11	Rosie; MacLennan (Light Blue)	Sam Dick (NZL)				17	–	14	4	24	20									441
11	Rosie; MacLennan (Light Blue)	Gabriel Burtănete (ROU)				–	13	–	1	–	–									441
11	Rosie; MacLennan (Light Blue)	Yin Dehang (CHN)				11	2	3	–	4	12									441
11	Rosie; MacLennan (Light Blue)	Emma Spence (CAN)				8			2			11	5							441
11	Rosie; MacLennan (Light Blue)	Nazlı Savranbaşı (TUR)				24			13			20	–							441
11	Rosie; MacLennan (Light Blue)	Sofia Nair (ALG)				–			–			DNS	22							441
11	Rosie; MacLennan (Light Blue)	Tia Sobhy (EGY)												23	24	22	22			441
11	Rosie; MacLennan (Light Blue)	Azra Dewan (RSA)												22	23	24	24			441
11	Rosie; MacLennan (Light Blue)	Lina Wahada (TUN)												–	–	–	–			441
11	Rosie; MacLennan (Light Blue)	Benny Wizani (AUT)																3	5	441
11	Rosie; MacLennan (Light Blue)	Yuki Okuno (JPN)																5	5	441
12	Marina; Chernova (Light Green)	Arina Yulusheva (UZB); Nikolay Evdokimov (UZB)	10	10	10															492
12	Marina; Chernova (Light Green)	Nguyễn Văn Khánh Phong (VIE)				21	19	–	–	8	–									492
12	Marina; Chernova (Light Green)	Vlada Raković (SRB)				19	–	12	21	–	9									492
12	Marina; Chernova (Light Green)	Oļegs Ivanovs (LAT)				–	18	6	6	17	8									492
12	Marina; Chernova (Light Green)	Lisa Conradie (RSA)				–			23			12	24							492
12	Marina; Chernova (Light Green)	Olivia Araujo (ARG)				18			–			DNS								492
12	Marina; Chernova (Light Green)	Emma Slevin (IRL)				14			8			7	4							492
12	Marina; Chernova (Light Green)	Lee So-yun (KOR)												–	14	20	23			492
12	Marina; Chernova (Light Green)	Jennifer Rivera (COL)												21	22	23	20			492
12	Marina; Chernova (Light Green)	Antonella Genuzio (BOL)												20	–	–	–			492
12	Marina; Chernova (Light Green)	Ivan Litvinovich (BLR)																1	1	492
12	Marina; Chernova (Light Green)	Thalia Loveira (NAM)																12	11	492
Rank	Team	Athlete	Acrobatic			Artistic								Rhythmic				Trampoline		Total points
Rank	Team	Athlete	D	B	C	Floor (gymnastics)	Pommel horse	Rings (gymnastics)	Vault (gymnastics)	Parallel bars	Horizontal bar	Uneven bars	Balance beam	Hoop (rhythmic gymnastics)	Ball (rhythmic gymnastics)	Clubs (rhythmic gymnastics)	Ribbon (rhythmic gymnastics)	R1	R2	Total points
