= Roza Abitova =

Kazakh rhythmic gymnast

- Роза Әбитова
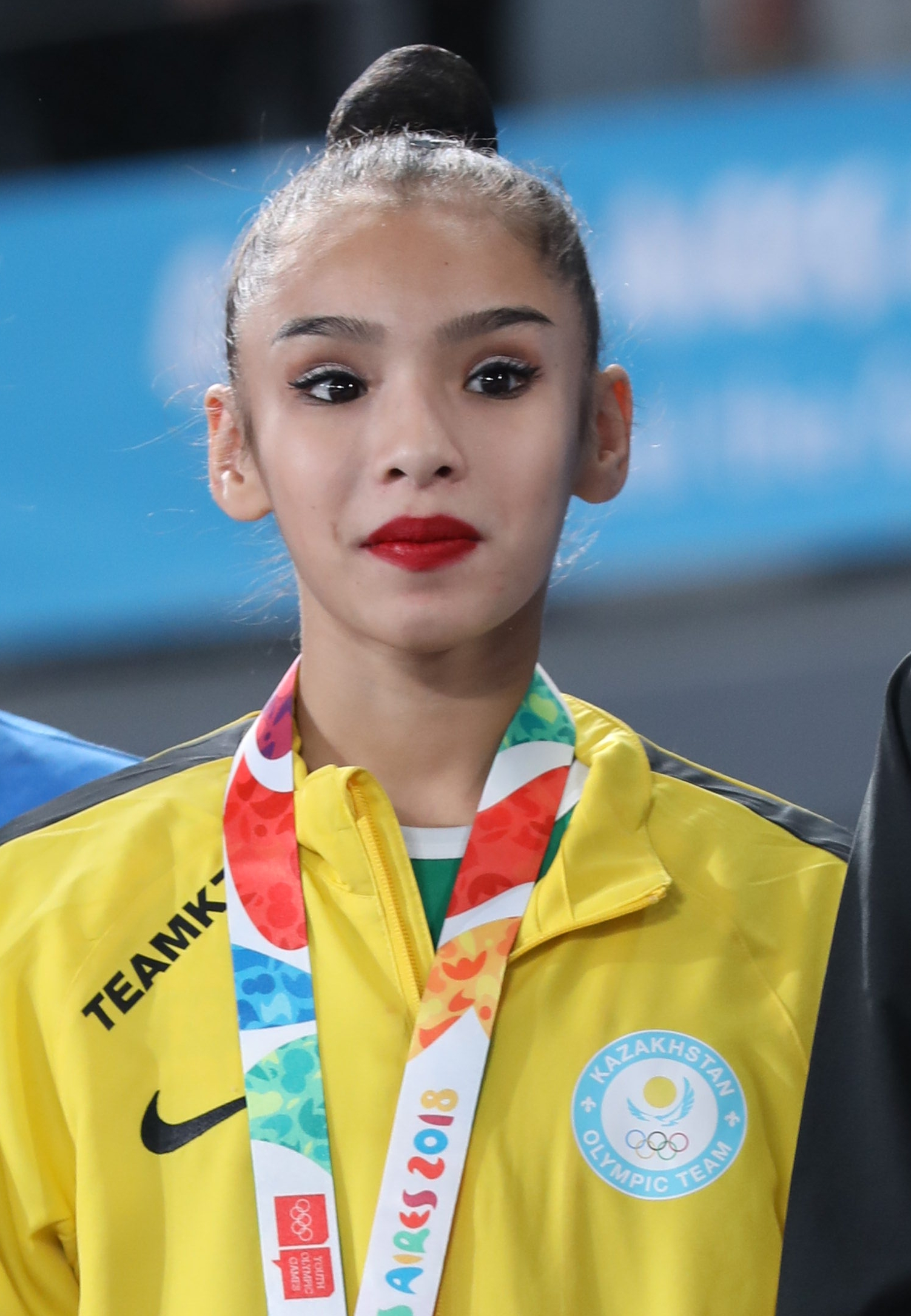
- Abitova in 2018

Personal information
- Born: 6 November 2003 (age 22) Shymkent

Gymnastics career
- Discipline: Rhythmic gymnastics
- Country represented: Kazakhstan; (2018-2022)
- Club: Rhythmic Gymnastics Specialised Youth Sports School of Olympic Reserve
- Head coach: Lola Adilbekova
- Retired: yes
Medal record
Women's rhythmic gymnastics
Representing Kazakhstan
Asian Championships
Gold medal – first place	2018 Kuala Lumpur	Junior Team
Gold medal – first place	2018 Kuala Lumpur	Junior All-around
Gold medal – first place	2018 Kuala Lumpur	Junior Hoop
Gold medal – first place	2018 Kuala Lumpur	Junior Ball
Youth Olympic Games
Silver medal – second place	2018 Buenos Aires	Mixed team

Roza Äbitova (Kazakh: Роза Әбитова; born 6 November 2003) is a Kazakh retired rhythmic gymnast. She represented Kazakhstan in international competitions.

== Personal life ==
She began the sport at age seven in Shymkent after her parents' friends suggested that she try the sport. Her idols are Dina Averina, Arina Averina and Evgeniya Kanaeva.

== Career ==
In October 2017 Abitova won the Kazakh championships among juniors. In May 2018 she won gold in teams (alongside Renata Zholdinova, Sabina Bakatova and Aibota Yertaykyzy) at the Asian Championships, she also earned a quota for the Youth Olympics of Buenos Aires by winning gold in the All-Around as well as with hoop and ball. In Argentina she took 9th place in the preliminary round, missing the final by just 0.050 points, and won silver in the mixed team event as part of Team Max Whitlock. Following these results she was received by Kazakhstan's president in Astana for an award.

She became age eligible for senior competitions in 2019, debuting in a tournament in Budapest where she won bronze overall and silver with hoop. In March she took 11th place at the Aphrodite Cup. A month later she competed at the World Cup in Pesaro, being 44th in the All-Around, 35th with hoop, 33rd with ball, 42nd with clubs and 53rd with ribbon. At the Spartakiad of Kazakhstan she won bronze behind Adilya Tlekenova and Aidana Shakenova. Days later she performed at the World Cup in Tashkent, finishing 20th in the All-Around, 21st with hoop, 15th with ball, 19th with clubs and 35th with ribbon. She then won bronze at the Holon Grand Prix. In August she took part in the World Challenge Cup in Cluj-Napoca, taking 23rd place in the All-Around, 24th with hoop, 22nd with ball, 22nd with clubs and 18th with ribbon. In September she was selected for her maiden World Championships in Baku, competing with clubs and ribbon she was 73rd and 92nd with the apparatuses and 15th in teams. In October she topped the All-Around at the Kazakh Championships.

In February 2020 she won bronze with clubs at the Garcia Fair Cup behind Anastasiia Salos and Eva Meleshchuk. A month later she won bronze with ribbon at the Aphrodite Cup in Athens. She then became the national champion at the national championships.

In September 2022 she was named a reserve for the group at the World Championships in Sofia. She retired from the sport shortly after, starting to work as a coach.
