= Alina Adilkhanova =

Kazakhstani rhythmic gymnast

- Full name: Alina Muratovna Adilkhanova
- Born: 26 September 2001 (age 24) Karaganda, Kazakhstan
- Height: 166 cm (5 ft 5 in)

Gymnastics career
- Discipline: Rhythmic gymnastics
- Country represented: Kazakhstan (2017 - present)
- Head coach: Aliya Yussupova
Medal record
Representing Kazakhstan
Asian Games
Gold medal – first place	2018 Jakarta	Team
Gold medal – first place	2018 Jakarta	All-around
Asian Championships
Gold medal – first place	2021 Tashkent	All-around
Gold medal – first place	2021 Tashkent	Clubs
Gold medal – first place	2018 Kuala Lumpur	All-around
Gold medal – first place	2018 Kuala Lumpur	Ball
Gold medal – first place	2018 Kuala Lumpur	Ribbon
Silver medal – second place	2021 Tashkent	Hoop
Silver medal – second place	2021 Tashkent	Ball
Silver medal – second place	2018 Kuala Lumpur	Team
Silver medal – second place	2018 Kuala Lumpur	Hoop
Silver medal – second place	2017 Astana	Hoop
Bronze medal – third place	2018 Kuala Lumpur	Clubs

Alina Muratovna Adilkhanova (Kazakh: Алина Мұратқызы Әділханова; born 26 September 2001) is a Kazakhstani rhythmic gymnast. She is the 2018 Asian Games all-around and team champion. She is also the 2018 and 2021 Asian all-around champion and is an eleven-time medalist at the Asian Championships. She represented Kazakhstan at the 2020 Summer Olympics and placed twenty-first in the qualification round for the all-around.

== Career ==
=== 2017 ===
Adilkhanova made her senior international debut at the Baku World Cup and finished twenty-third in the all-around. Then at the Guadalajara World Challenge Cup, she finished fifteenth in the all-around. She won her first Asian Championships in 2017- a silver in hoop behind Japan's Kaho Minagawa. In August, she competed at the Kazan World Challenge Cup and finished twenty-first in the all-around. She was selected to compete at the World Championships in Pesaro. She finished twenty-eighth in the all-around during the qualification round and was the fourth reserve for the all-around final.

=== 2018 ===
Adilkhanova began the season at the Sofia World Cup, placing thirteenth in the all-around. In May, she competed at the Asian Championships in Kuala Lumpur where she won the all-around, ball, and ribbon gold medals as well as team and hoop silver and clubs bronze. Then in August, she finished seventeenth in the all-around at the Minsk World Challenge Cup. She represented Kazakhstan at the 2018 Asian Games in Jakarta and won the gold medal in the team event alongside Dayana Abdirbekova and Adilya Tlekenova. Then in the all-around final, she won the gold medal with a total score of 66.800, nearly one point ahead of Uzbekistan's Sabina Tashkenbaeva. Then at the World Championships in Sofia, she helped the Kazakh team place twelfth. Individually, she qualified for the all-around final and finished nineteenth with a total score of 66.175.

=== 2019 ===
Adilkhanova placed fifteenth in the all-around at the Tashkent World Cup. She then finished twenty-sixth in the all-around at the Baku World Cup. At the Minsk World Challenge Cup, she placed thirtieth in the all-around. She then finished twenty-fourth all-around at the Kazan World Challenge Cup. Then at the World Championships in Baku, she helped the Kazakh team place fifteenth. Individually, she placed thirty-fifth in the all-around during the qualification round. After the World Championships, she won the all-around gold medal at the 2019 Kazakhstan Championships.

=== 2021 ===
Adilkhanova competed at four events on the 2021 World Cup series. First in Sofia, she placed twenty-sixth in the all-around. She then finished fifteenth in the all-around in Tashkent. Then in Baku, she finished twenty-eighth in the all-around. Finally in Pesaro, she only competed in clubs and finished twenty-first. She won the gold medal in the all-around at the 2021 Asian Championships in Tashkent, Uzbekistan and qualified the continental quota spot for the 2020 Olympic Games, and she also won gold in clubs and silver in the hoop and ball. At the 2020 Olympics, she finished twenty-first in the qualification round for the individual all-around. She announced her plans to continue training for the 2024 Olympic Games.
