= Chisaki Oiwa =

Japanese rhythmic gymnast

- Nicknames: Chi, Chimi
- Born: 20 November 2001 (age 24) Noda, Chiba, Japan
- Height: 160 cm (5 ft 3 in)

Gymnastics career
- Discipline: Rhythmic gymnastics
- Country represented: Japan (2016 - present)
- Club: Aeon Sports Club
- Head coaches: Rika Yamamoto, Larisa Sidorova

Chisaki Oiwa (大岩 千未来 Ōiwa Chisaki born 20 November 2001) is a Japanese rhythmic gymnast. She represented Japan at the 2020 Summer Olympics and finished nineteenth in the qualification round for the individual all-around. She is a three-time World Championships all-around finalist (2018, 2019, 2021).

== Early and personal life ==
Oiwa was born in Noda, Chiba on 20 November 2001. She began rhythmic gymnastics at age five and quit playing piano at age six to focus solely on rhythmic gymnastics. She is a student at Kokushikan University.

== Career ==
Oiwa made her senior international debut at the 2017 Minsk World Challenge Cup and finished fourteenth in the all-around. She then competed at the 2018 Asian Games in Jakarta where the Japanese team placed fourth behind Kazakhstan, Uzbekistan, and South Korea. In the all-around final, she placed sixth with a total score of 60.200. Then at the World Championships in Sofia, she finished eighth in the team competition alongside Sumire Kita and Kaho Minagawa. She also finished twenty-third in the all-around final with a total score of 63.450.

Oiwa competed at five events during the 2019 World Cup series. First, in Pesaro, she finished seventeenth in the all-around. Then in Baku, she placed twelfth in the all-around. She qualified for the clubs final at the Guadalajara World Challenge Cup and finished sixth. She then finished twelfth in the all-around at the Minsk World Challenge Cup. Then at the Kazan World Cup, she finished eighth in the clubs final. At the 2019 World Championships in Baku, she finished nineteenth in the all-around final and eighth in the team competition with Sumire Kita and Kaho Minagawa.

Oiwa competed in the 2021 World Cup series to qualify for an Olympic berth. First, in Sofia, she finished eighth in the all-around and seventh in the ribbon event final. Then in Tashkent, she placed seventeenth in the all-around. She then finished nineteenth in the all-around at the Baku World Cup. Finally in Pesaro, she finished tenth in the all-around, eighth in ball, and fifth in clubs. These results earned Oiwa an Olympic berth. She was the third-highest ranked eligible gymnast, after Slovenia's Ekaterina Vedeneeva and Uzbekistan's Sabina Tashkenbaeva. At the 2020 Olympic Games in Tokyo, Oiwa finished nineteenth in the qualification round for the individual all-around with a total score of 87.550. After the Olympics, she competed at the World Championships in Kitakyushu and finished thirteenth in the all-around final with a total score of 93.400. She also finished fifth in the team competition with the Japanese team.
