= Zhao Yating =

Chinese rhythmic gymnast

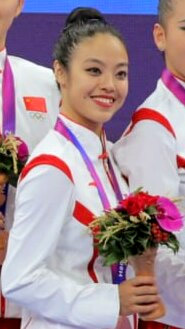
- Zhao at the 2022 Asian Games

Personal information
- Born: May 12, 2001 (age 25) Yuncheng, Shanxi, China

Gymnastics career
- Discipline: Rhythmic gymnastics
- Country represented: China; (2011 - present)
- Head coaches: Yan Yunwen, Kang Qi
- Assistant coach: Larisa Sidorova
Medal record
Rhythmic Gymnastics
Representing China
Asian Games
Bronze medal – third place	2018 Jakarta	All-around
Bronze medal – third place	2022 Hangzhou	Team
Asian Championships
Gold medal – first place	2023 Manila	Ribbon
Gold medal – first place	2021 Tashkent	Ribbon
Gold medal – first place	2019 Pattaya	Ribbon
Gold medal – first place	2019 Pattaya	Clubs
Gold medal – first place	2019 Pattaya	Hoop
Gold medal – first place	2019 Pattaya	Ball
Silver medal – second place	2019 Pattaya	All-around
Silver medal – second place	2019 Pattaya	Team
Bronze medal – third place	2022 Pattaya	All-around
Bronze medal – third place	2022 Pattaya	Hoop
Bronze medal – third place	2022 Pattaya	Ribbon
Bronze medal – third place	2021 Tashkent	Clubs
Bronze medal – third place	2021 Tashkent	Hoop
Bronze medal – third place	2023 Manila	Team
Bronze medal – third place	2018 Kuala Lumpur	Team
Bronze medal – third place	2017 Astana	Team

Zhao Yating
- Traditional Chinese: 趙雅婷
- Simplified Chinese: 赵雅婷
Transcriptions

Zhao Yating (Chinese: 赵雅婷; born 12 May 2001 in Yuncheng, Shanxi, China) is a Chinese individual rhythmic gymnast.

== Career ==
Zhao first tried rhythmic gymnastics at age three in Yangquan and began formal training at age six. She was scouted by former gymnast Wu Chuangrong.

As a junior, Zhao won the all-around gold at the 2014 Pacific Rim Championships ahead of Nastasya Generalova of the US. In the event finals, Zhao won gold in hoop and ball and bronze in clubs and ribbon. She also won bronze in the all-around at the 2016 Pacific Rim Championships and took silver medals in ball and clubs.

She became a member of the national senior team in 2015.

In 2016, Zhao won the all-around silver medal at the Chinese National Championships. In the 2017 season, Zhao began training with overseas coach Larisa Sidorova, who has coached gymnasts such as Varvara Filiou. Zhao competed at the World Cup Series in Pesaro, Italy and Guadalajara, Spain. She won the all-around silver medal at the Chinese National Games behind Shang Rong. On 30 August—3 September, Zhao competed at the 2017 World Championships, finishing 21st in the individual all-around finals behind Greece's Eleni Kelaiditi.

In 2018, on 13–15 April, Zhao competed at the 2018 Pesaro World Cup, finishing 14th in the all-around, and in May, Zhao competed at the 2018 Portimao World Challenge Cup, where she placed18th in the all-around.

In late August, Zhao competed at the 2018 Asian Games in Jakarta. She placed 5th in the team event, and in the individual all-around final, she won the bronze medal behind Alina Adilkhanova (Kazakhstan) and Sabina Tashkenbaeva (Uzbekistan).

== Routine music information ==
Year	Apparatus	Music Title
2023	Hoop	Que Te Pedí by Anaís
2023	Ball	Per Te si Saró by Il Volo
2023	Clubs	Vandals by Jo Blankenburg
2023	Ribbon	Alambre Alto by Cirque du Soleil
2022	Hoop	Draconian Dream / Pulling a Thread by Audiomachine and The Chamber Orchestra of London and Andrew Skeet
2022	Ball	Carmen
2022	Clubs	Land of 1000 Dances (feat. Chris Thompson) by Siggi Schwars & The Legends
2022	Ribbon	鸿雁 (Live) by 沙宝亮
2021	Hoop	Monster (Astrix Remix) by Astrix & Infected Mushroom
2021	Ball	Europa by Monica Naranjo
2021	Clubs	Opposites Attract (12" Mix) by Paula Abdul
2021	Ribbon	The 5th by David Garrett
2020	Hoop	Training Po / Hero by Hans Zimmer & John Powell
2020	Ball	鸿雁 (Live) by 沙宝亮
2020	Clubs	Smooth Criminal (Inmortal Version) by Michael Jackson
2020	Ribbon	Winter (Four Seasons) by Ulytau
2019	Hoop	Lolaï (Snake's Charmer Mix) by Alabina
2019	Ball	Never Teas Us Apart by Bishop Briggs
2019	Clubs	Emergerncy by Icona Pop
2019	Ribbon	Tango Amore by Edvin Marton
2018	Hoop	
2018	Ball	Maria Siempre (Remasterizada) by Julia Zenko
2018	Clubs	Swing Punk by Tape Five
2018	Ribbon	New World Concerto by Maksim & Royal Philharmonic Orchestra
2017	Hoop	Strange by Apollo Gee-ze
2017	Ball	Je m'endors dans tes bras by Dalida
2017	Clubs	Bailar (feat. Pitbull & Elvis Crespo) by Deorro
2017	Ribbon	Dave Goes Crazy by The Toasters
