= 2019 Asian Rhythmic Gymnastics Championships =

International rhythmic gymnastics competition

The 11th Rhythmic Gymnastics Asian Championships was held in Pattaya, Thailand from June 20 to 23, 2019.

== Medal winners ==
Event	Gold	Silver	Bronze
All-around
Individual	Sabina Tashkenbaeva (UZB)	Zhao Yating (CHN)	Adilya Tlekenova (KAZ)
Team	Uzbekistan; Sabina Tashkenbaeva; Nurinisso Usmanova; Ekaterina Fetisova	China; Shang Rong; Zhao Yating; Liu Jiahui; Wang Zilu	Japan; Aino Yamada; Ryoko Inomata; Ruriko Shibayama; Takana Tatsuzawa
Group	Japan	Uzbekistan	China
Individual
Hoop	Zhao Yating (CHN)	Adilya Tlekenova (KAZ)	Ekaterina Fetisova (UZB)
Ball	Zhao Yating (CHN)	Aidana Shakenova (KAZ)	Adilya Tlekenova (KAZ)
Clubs	Zhao Yating (CHN)	Adilya Tlekenova (KAZ)	Ruriko Shibayama (JPN)
Ribbon	Zhao Yating (CHN)	Ruriko Shibayama (JPN)	Adilya Tlekenova (KAZ)
Group
5 balls	Uzbekistan	Japan	China
4 clubs + 3 hoops	Uzbekistan	China	Japan

== Medal table ==
Rank	Nation	Gold	Silver	Bronze	Total
1	China (CHN)	4	3	2	9
2	Uzbekistan (UZB)	4	1	1	6
3	Japan (JPN)	1	2	3	6
4	Kazakhstan (KAZ)	0	3	3	6
Totals (4 entries)		9	9	9	27
