= Liu Jiahui (gymnast) =

Chinese rhythmic gymnast

- Full name: Liu Jiahui
- Born: 31 March 1996 (age 30) Handan, China

Gymnastics career
- Discipline: Rhythmic gymnastics
- Country represented: China (2014)
- Club: Hebei Province
- Head coach: Bai Me
Medal record
Representing China
Rhythmic Gymnastics
Asian Championships
| Silver medal – second place | 2019 Pattaya | Team |
| Silver medal – second place | 2017 Astana | Ball |
| Bronze medal – third place | 2017 Astana | Hoop |
| Bronze medal – third place | 2017 Astana | Team |
Pacific Rim Championships
| Bronze medal – third place | 2012 Everett | Team |

Liu Jiahui (born 31 March 1996 in Handan) is a Chinese individual rhythmic gymnast.

== Career ==
Liu has competed for China at World Championships, including at the 2014 World Rhythmic Gymnastics Championships where the Chinese team finished 13th. She also participated at the 2014 Asian Games, finishing 10th in the individual all-round. She also competed at the 2015 World Rhythmic Gymnastics Championships.

In June 2017, Liu competed at the 2017 Asian Championships and finished 6th in the all-round. She won a bronze medal in the ball final behind Kaho Minagawa of Japan.

She began the sport in primary school in Handan, China.
