= Kim Chae-woon =

South Korean rhythmic gymnast (born 2001)

Kim Chaewoon
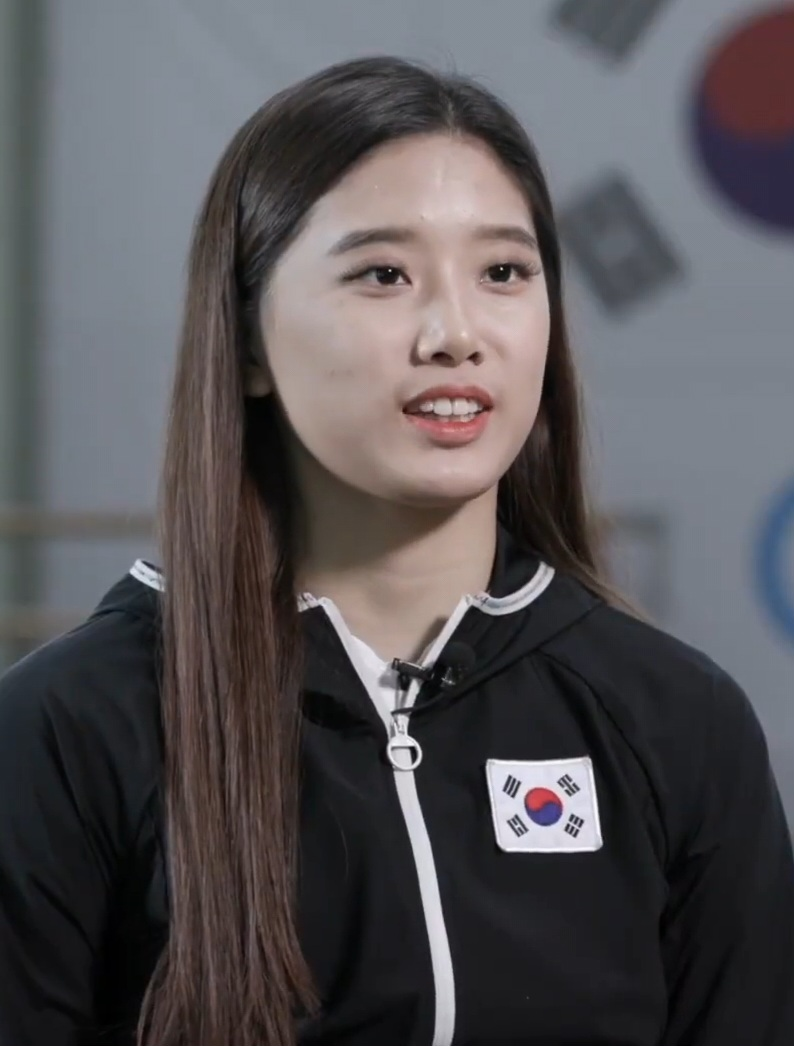
- Full name: 김채운
- Born: 10 March 2001 (age 25) Seoul, South Korea

Gymnastics career
- Country represented: South Korea; (South Korea)
- Club: Sejong University
- Gym: Novogorsk
- Head coach: Evgeniya Gertsikova
- Retired: 2021
- World ranking: 34 (2019 Season)
Medal record
Representing South Korea
Rhythmic Gymnastics
Asian Games
Bronze medal – third place	2018 Jakarta	Team
Asian Championships
Silver medal – second place	2018 Kuala Lumpur	Ball
Bronze medal – third place	2018 Kuala Lumpur	Hoop
Bronze medal – third place	2021 Tashkent	Ball

Kim Chae-woon (born 10 March 2001) is a South Korean retired individual rhythmic gymnast. She is a multiple time medalist at the Asian Rhythmic Championships and was part of the team that won the bronze medal at the 2018 Asian Games.

== Athletic career ==
Kim began rhythmic gymnastics during middle school, when she was 10 years old. At first, it was only a hobby for her, but her coach encouraged her to take it up seriously. She trained in Novogorsk, house of the Russian national team, with coach Evgeniya Gertsikova for a 5 years period.

=== 2017–2021 ===
In her first senior year, she won the Korean National championships in March, and was named as the future Son Yeon-jae of rhythmic gymnastics. At the 2017 Asian Championships, she finished 9th in the all-around final and 5th in the team competition. Her first world cup was the 2017 Kazan World Challenge Cup, where she finished 18th in the all-around. Earlier that year, she competed at the 2017 World Games in Wrocław but did not advance to any apparatus final, her highest placement being 16th with the ribbon. Her last competition of the season was the 2017 World Championships in Pesaro, finishing 31st in the qualifications thus not advancing in the all-around finals.

She began her next season at the 2018 Grand Prix Moscow, finishing in the 15th place, qualifying into the ball and hoop final.

In 2019, she participated at the annual Aeon Cup in Tokyo along Lim Se-eun, and the junior gymnast Sohn Ji-in representing Sejong & Bongeun RG: they finished 6th in the qualification round.

In 2021, she won the bronze medal with 23.55 points in the individual ball event at the 2021 Asian Rhythmic Gymnastics Championships. Thereafter on September 28, 2021, she announced on her Instagram account that she had retired with the Asian Rhythmic Gymnastics Championships being the last competition she participated in.
