= 2017 Asian Rhythmic Gymnastics Championships =

International rhythmic gymnastics competition

The 9th Rhythmic Gymnastics Asian Championships was held in Astana, Kazakhstan from 24–27 June 2017.

== Medal winners ==
Event	Gold	Silver	Bronze
All-around Finals
Individual	Anastasiya Serdyukova (UZB)	Kaho Minagawa (JPN)	Sabina Tashkenbaeva (UZB)
Team	Uzbekistan; Nurinisso Usmanova; Sabina Tashkenbaeva; Anastasiya Serdyukova; Anora Davlyatova	Japan; Kaho Minagawa; Sumire Kita; Ruriko Shibayama	China; Liu Jiahui; Shang Rong; Zhao Yating; Kang Qi
Group	Japan	North Korea	China
Individual Finals
Hoop	Kaho Minagawa (JPN)	Alina Adilkhanova (KAZ)	Liu Jiahui (CHN)
Ball	Kaho Minagawa (JPN)	Liu Jiahui (CHN)	Anastasiya Serdyukova (UZB)
Clubs	Anastasiya Serdyukova (UZB)	Sabina Tashkenbaeva (UZB)	Kaho Minagawa (JPN)
Ribbon	Anastasiya Serdyukova (UZB)	Sabina Tashkenbaeva (UZB)	Sumire Kita (JPN)
Group Finals
5 hoops	Japan	Uzbekistan	China
3 balls + 2 ropes	Japan	China	Kazakhstan

== Medal table ==
Rank	Nation	Gold	Silver	Bronze	Total
1	Japan (JPN)	5	2	2	9
2	Uzbekistan (UZB)	4	3	2	9
3	China (CHN)	0	2	4	6
4	Kazakhstan (KAZ)	0	1	1	2
5	North Korea (PRK)	0	1	0	1
Totals (5 entries)		9	9	9	27
