= Sabina Tashkenbaeva =

Uzbekistani rhythmic gymnast (born 2000)

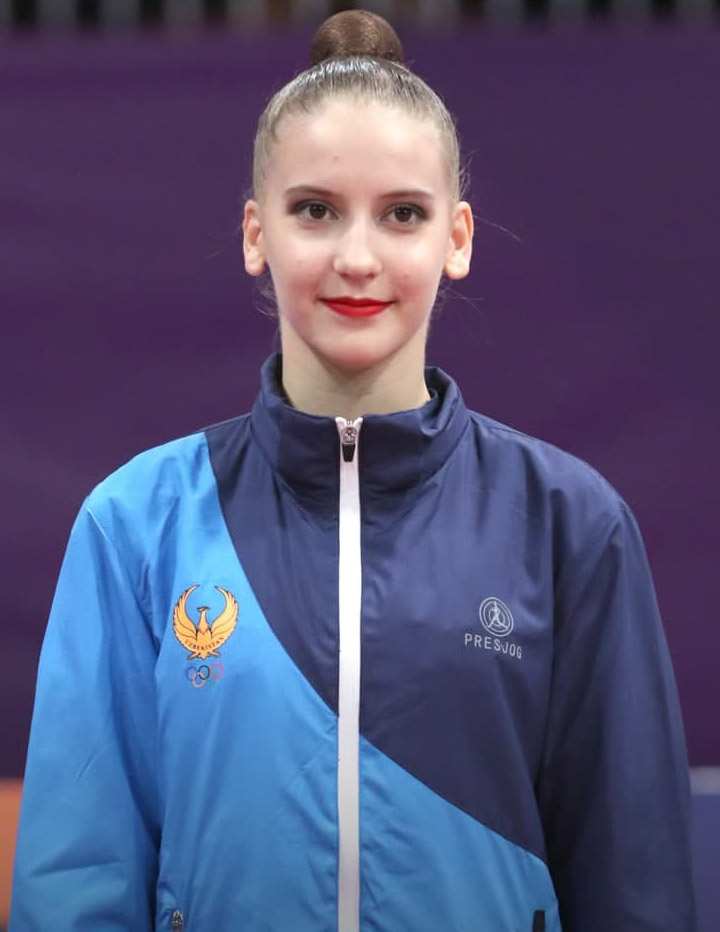

Personal information
- Born: 27 November 2000 (age 25) Tashkent, Uzbekistan
- Spouse: Niyaz Pulatov

Gymnastics career
- Discipline: Rhythmic gymnastics
- Country represented: Uzbekistan; (2013–2022)
- Assistant coach: Liliya Vlasova
- Choreographer: Maya Filippova
Medal record
Representing Uzbekistan
Asian Games
| Silver medal – second place | 2018 Jakarta | Team |
| Silver medal – second place | 2018 Jakarta | All-around |
Asian Championships
| Gold medal – first place | 2017 Astana | Team |
| Gold medal – first place | 2018 Kuala Lumpur | Team |
| Gold medal – first place | 2018 Kuala Lumpur | Clubs |
| Gold medal – first place | 2019 Pattaya | All-around |
| Gold medal – first place | 2019 Pattaya | Team |
| Silver medal – second place | 2017 Astana | Clubs |
| Silver medal – second place | 2017 Astana | Ribbon |
| Silver medal – second place | 2018 Kuala Lumpur | All-around |
| Bronze medal – third place | 2017 Astana | All-around |
Islamic Solidarity Games
| Silver medal – second place | 2017 Baku | Team |
| Silver medal – second place | 2021 Konya | Team |
| Bronze medal – third place | 2017 Baku | Clubs |
| Bronze medal – third place | 2021 Konya | Clubs |
| Bronze medal – third place | 2017 Baku | Ribbon |
- Last updated on: 16 August 2022.

Sabina Tashkenbaeva (born 27 November 2000 in Tashkent, Uzbekistan) is an Uzbekistani former individual rhythmic gymnast. She is the 2019 Asian Championships all-around gold medalist and the 2018 Asian Games silver all-around and team medalist. She was the first Uzbekistani gymnast to win a silver medal on the World Cup series.

== Career ==
Tashkenbaeva began training in gymnastics in 2006. She joined the national team in 2013. As a junior, she competed in the "Happy Caravan" tournament held in conjunction with the World Cup event in her hometown of Tashkent. She won bronze in the all-around as well as three of the apparatus finals.

She made her international senior debut in 2016. The 2016 Asian Championships were held in Tashkent, and Taskenbaeva competed there and placed 6th in the all-around.

Tashkenbaeva competed at the 2017 Islamic Solidarity Games, earning silver in the team event alongside compatriots Anastasiya Serdyukova and Nurinisso Usmanova, as well as bronze in both the clubs and ribbon individual competition. In June, she won bronze in the all-around at the Asian Championships, and she also won two silver medals in the club and ribbon finals. At the 2017 World Championships, she qualified to the all-around final and placed 22nd. In October, her club competed at the Aeon Cup and won silver.

The next year, she won the silver medal in the clubs final at the World Cup Tashkent in April. This was the first time an Uzbekistani gymnast had won silver at a World Cup stage. Later in April, she competed at the 2018 Asian Championships, where she won silver in the all-around and gold in the clubs final. At the 2018 World Championships, she finished 16th in the all-around.

In August, she won silver in both the individual all-around and team events at the 2018 Asian Games held in Jakarta, Indonesia.

At the 2019 Asian Championships held in Pattaya, Thailand, she won the gold medal in the individual all-around and team all-around events. She competed at the 2019 World Championships and placed 34th in the qualifying round, and she did not advance to the all-around final.

Through the 2021 FIG World Cup Series, Tashkenbaeva qualified for an Olympic berth. She was the second-highest ranked eligible gymnast, after Slovenia's Ekaterina Vedeneeva. However, shortly before the 2020 Summer Olympics, she had a positive test for COVID-19 and was replaced by Ekaterina Fetisova. That year, she was awarded the "Kelajak Bunyodkori" medal by the president of Uzbekistan.

At the 2022 Asian Championships, she won gold in the team event with her fellow Uzbekistani gymnasts. Individually, she placed 12th in the all-around and won the silver medal in the ball final. In August, she attended the 2021 Islamic Solidarity Games and won silver in the team event and bronze in the ball final.

Tashkenbaeva announced her retirement on 21 January, 2023.

== Personal life ==
Tashkenbaeva was born 27 November, 2000 in Tashkent.

She speaks English, Russian and Uzbek. She attended the Uzbek State University of Physical Culture and Sports and is married to Niyaz Pulatov.
