= Aurora Arvelo =

Finnish rhythmic gymnast

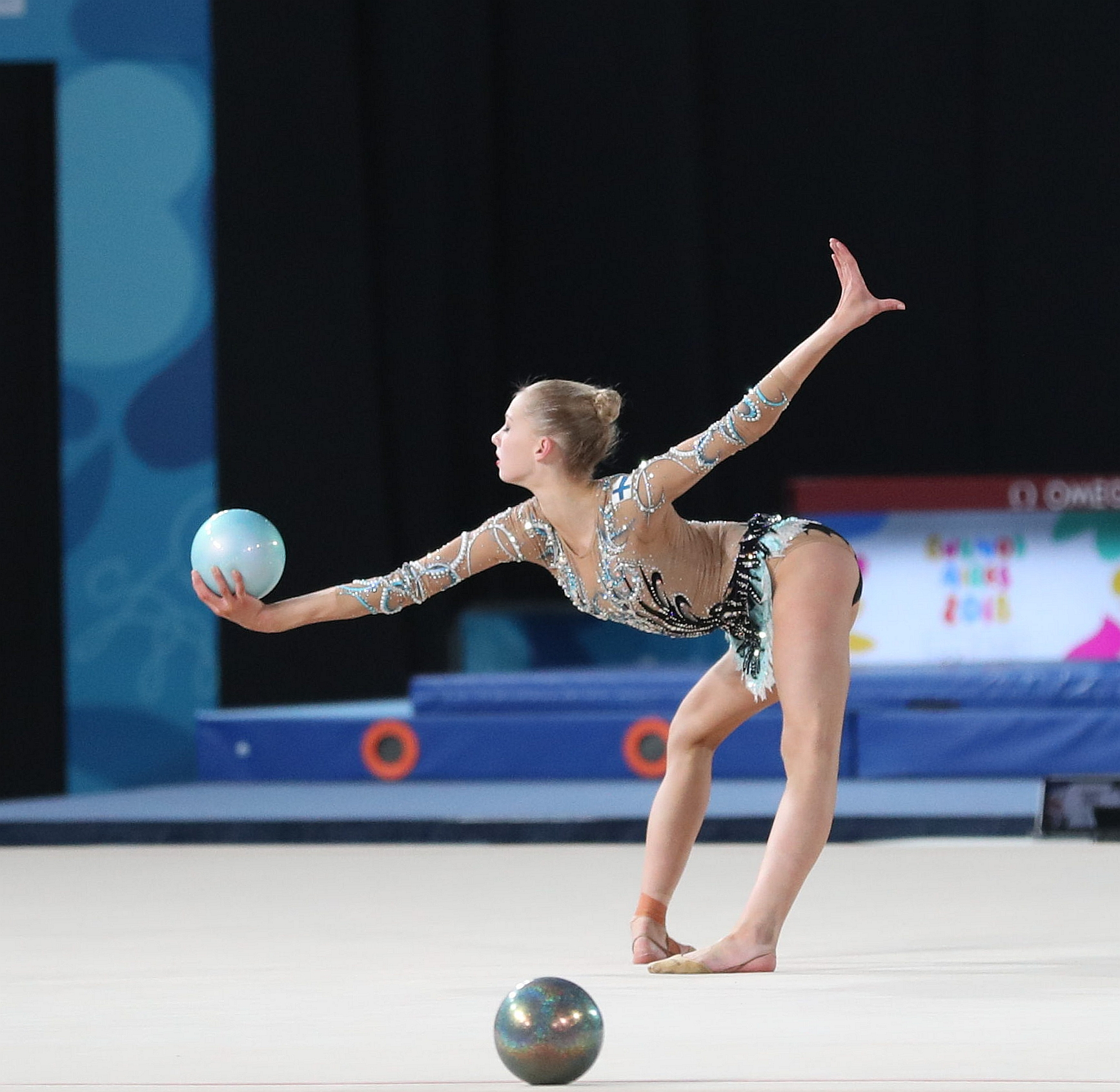

Personal information
- Born: 5 April 2003 (age 23) Helsinki, Finland
- Height: 175 cm (5 ft 9 in)

Gymnastics career
- Discipline: Rhythmic gymnastics
- Country represented: Finland (2017-2021)
- Club: Olarin Voimistelijat
- Head coach: Larisa Gryadunova
- Assistant coach: Laura Ahonen
Medal record
Representing Finland
Event	1st	2nd	3rd
Grand Prix	0	0	1
Nordic Championships	5	2	0
Nationals	7	2	5
Total	12	4	6

Aurora Arvelo (born 5 April 2003) is a Finnish rhythmic gymnast. She represented her country at the 2018 Youth Olympic Games.

== Personal life ==
Arvelo took up the sport in 2009. She studied at the Mäkelänrinne's sports high school.

== Career ==
=== Junior ===
In 2016 Arvelo represented Finland at the Nordic Championship, helping the team win the gold medal. She finished 8th with rope at the national junior championship.

Aurora was the 2017 national vice-champion, getting gold in 3 event finals and silver with hoop.

In 2018 Arvelo competed at the Nordic Championships where she finished 1st with ribbon and 2nd with ball. At nationals she won the All-around, and the hoop, clubs and ribbon final. She was also selected to compete at the 2018 European Championship in Guadalajara, Spain, she finished 21st with ball, 39th with hoop, 35th with clubs and 25th with ribbon. Aurora qualified for the Youth Olympic Games in Buenos Aires, Argentina, finishing 9th with ball and 12th in the All-Around and not advancing to the final.

=== Senior ===
Arvelo was injured after the Youth Olympics, returning to full training in March 2019. She went on to compete at nationals getting bronze in the All-Around and event finals. Aurora was selected to represent Finland at the 2019 World Championships in Baku, Azerbaijan, competing with clubs and ribbon.

In 2020 she competed at Miss Valentine and won silver in the ribbon final as well as the RV Championship. At Nordic Championship she took silver behind Rebecca Gergalo and gold with hoop, clubs and ribbon.

She retired from the sport in 2021.
