= Yulia Vodopyanova =

Armenian rhythmic gymnast (born 2003)

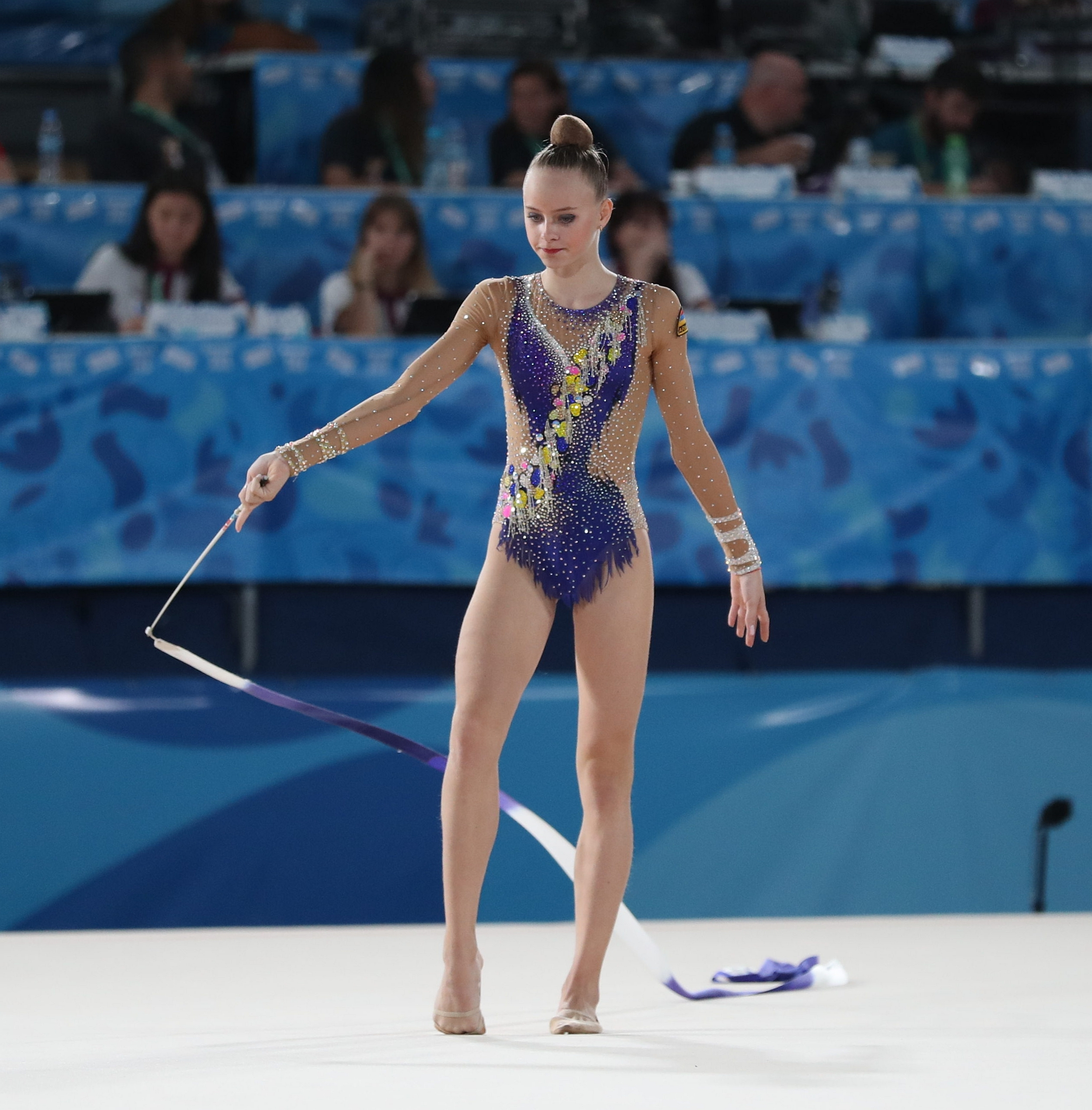

Personal information
- Born: April 4, 2003 (age 23) Yerevan, Armenia

Gymnastics career
- Discipline: Rhythmic gymnastics
- Country represented: Armenia; (2016-)
- Head coach: Gayane Nersisyan
- Assistant coach: Natalia Tishina

Yulia Vodopyanova (born 4 April 2003) is an Armenian rhythmic gymnast. She represented her country at the 2018 Youth Olympics.

== Career ==
=== Junior ===
Yulia debuted at the 2016 European Championships in Holon where she was 7th in teams, 7th with rope, 13th with hoop, 6th with ball, 5th with clubs.

In 2018 she was at the European Championships in Guadalajara, being 6th in the All-Around, 26th with hoop, 8th with ball, 7th with clubs and 27th with ribbon. In October she represented Armenia at the Youth Olympics in Buenos Aires ending 6th in the All-Around.

=== Senior ===
Vodopyanova became a senior in 2019 starting her season at the World Cup in Pesaro, being 14th in the All-Around, 19th with hoop, 13th with ball, 13th with clubs and 22nd with ribbon. She then competed in Sofia taking 15th in the All-Around, 19th with hoop, 21st with ball, 8th with clubs and 12th with ribbon. In April, she took part in the World Cup in Tashkent ending 12th in the All-Around, 7th with hoop, 10th with ball, 14th with clubs and 15th with ribbon.
