= Shang Rong (gymnast) =

Chinese rhythmic gymnast

- Born: February 12, 2000 (age 26) Dandong, Liaoning, China
- Height: 170 cm (5 ft 7 in)

Gymnastics career
- Discipline: Rhythmic gymnastics
- Country represented: China
- Club: Liaoning Sports Club
- World ranking: 42 (2016 Season)
Medal record
Representing China
Rhythmic Gymnastics
Asian Championships
Silver medal – second place	2018 Kuala Lumpur	Ribbon
Silver medal – second place	2019 Pattaya	Team
Bronze medal – third place	2017 Astana	Team
Bronze medal – third place	2018 Kuala Lumpur	Team

Shang Rong
- Traditional Chinese: 尚蓉
- Simplified Chinese: 尚蓉
Transcriptions
Standard Mandarin
- Hanyu Pinyin: Shāng Róng

Shang Rong (Chinese: 尚蓉; pinyin: Shāng Róng; born 12 February 2000 in Dandong, Liaoning, China) is a Chinese individual rhythmic gymnast.

== Career ==
Shang debuted her seniors in 2015 Season although she did not compete in a lot of international competitions. She did not make the list of the Chinese team to compete at the 2015 World Championships.

In 2016 Season, Shang competed in her first FIG World Cup event at the 2016 Espoo World Cup where she finished 24th in the all-around. On April 21–22, Shang beat compatriot Liu Jiahui for an Olympics license in individual rhythmic gymnastics by finishing seventh amongst a top 8 selection of highest score for non qualified gymnasts at the 2016 Gymnastics Olympic Test Event held in Rio de Janeiro. On May 8–10, Shang finished 5th in the all-around at the 2016 Asian Championships with a total of 68.000 points and qualified to all 4 apparatus finals. On May 13–15, Shang competed at the 2016 Tashkent World Cup finishing 13th in the all-around. On July 8–10, Shang then finished 33rd in the all-around at the 2016 Kazan World Cup. On August 19–20, Shang competed at the 2016 Summer Olympics held in Rio de Janeiro, Brazil. She finished 24th in the rhythmic gymnastics individual all-around qualifications and did not advance into the top 10 finals.

On April 7–9, Shang competed at the 2017 Pesaro World Cup finishing 24th in the all-around. Her next event was at the 2017 World Challenge Cup Guadalajara where she finished 13th in the all-around, she qualified in 1 apparatus final and finished 4th in ball. On June 24–27, Shang competed at the 2017 Asian Championships and won gold in the all-around, she also won silver in team event. She won 2 gold medals in the apparatus finals in clubs and ribbon and finished 4th in ball. On June 24–27, Shang competed at the 2017 Asian Championships and qualified to the hoop and ball final. On August 30 - September 3, Shang competed at the 2017 World Championships in Pesaro, Italy; finishing 29th in the all-around qualifications and thus not making the top 24 all-around finalists.

On April 13–15, Shang competed at the 2018 Pesaro World Cup finishing 24th in the all-around. On May 11–13, Shang competed at the 2018 Portimao World Challenge Cup finishing 11th in the all-around.
