= Nurinisso Usmanova =

Uzbekistani rhythmic gymnast (born 2001)

- Born: 3 April 2001 (age 25)

Gymnastics career
- Discipline: Rhythmic gymnastics
- Country represented: Uzbekistan
Medal record
Representing Uzbekistan
Asian Games
Silver medal – second place	2018 Jakarta	Team
Asian Championships
Gold medal – first place	2017 Astana	Team
Gold medal – first place	2018 Kuala Lumpur	Team
Gold medal – first place	2018 Kuala Lumpur	Hoop
Gold medal – first place	2019 Pattaya	Team
Silver medal – second place	2018 Kuala Lumpur	Clubs
Bronze medal – third place	2018 Kuala Lumpur	All-around
Bronze medal – third place	2018 Kuala Lumpur	Ball
Islamic Solidarity Games
Silver medal – second place	2017 Baku	Team

Nurinisso Usmanova (born 3 April 2001) is an Uzbekistani rhythmic gymnast. In 2018, she won the silver medal in team event at the 2018 Asian Games held in Jakarta, Indonesia.

She began learning rhythmic gymnastics at age four.
