= 2018 Asian Rhythmic Gymnastics Championships =

International rhythmic gymnastics competition

The 10th Rhythmic Gymnastics Asian Championships was held in Kuala Lumpur, Malaysia from April 30 to May 2, 2018.

== Medal winners ==
Event	Gold	Silver	Bronze
All-around Finals
Individual	Alina Adilkhanova (KAZ)	Sabina Tashkenbaeva (UZB)	Nurinisso Usmanova (UZB)
Team	Uzbekistan; Sabina Tashkenbaeva; Nurinisso Usmanova; Dildora Rakhmatova; Asal Ikramova	Kazakhstan; Alina Adilkhanova; Adilya Tlekenova; Selina Zhumatayeva; Aidana Sarybay	China; Shang Rong; Zhao Yating; Ran Yu; Qi Kang
Group	Japan	China	Kazakhstan; Regina Sultanova; Diana Zhakupova; Anel Talgatbek; Jessica Budnik; Zhanerke Dauletkulova
Individual Finals
Hoop	Nurinisso Usmanova (UZB)	Alina Adilkhanova (KAZ)	Kim Chae-woon (KOR)
Ball	Alina Adilkhanova (KAZ)	Kim Chae-woon (KOR)	Nurinisso Usmanova (UZB)
Clubs	Sabina Tashkenbaeva (UZB)	Nurinisso Usmanova (UZB)	Alina Adilkhanova (KAZ)
Ribbon	Alina Adilkhanova (KAZ)	Shang Rong (CHN)	Amy Kwan Dict Weng (MAS)
Group Finals
5 hoops	Japan	Kazakhstan	Malaysia
3 balls + 2 ropes	China	Japan	South Korea

== Medal table ==
Rank	Nation	Gold	Silver	Bronze	Total
1	Kazakhstan (KAZ)	3	3	2	8
2	Uzbekistan (UZB)	3	2	2	7
3	Japan (JPN)	2	1	0	3
4	China (CHN)	1	2	1	4
5	South Korea (KOR)	0	1	2	3
6	Malaysia (MAS)	0	0	2	2
Totals (6 entries)		9	9	9	27

== See also ==
- 2018 Rhythmic Gymnastics Asian Cup
