= Adilya Tlekenova =

Kazakhstani rhythmic gymnast

- Born: 17 July 2002 (age 24)

Gymnastics career
- Discipline: Rhythmic gymnastics
- Country represented: Kazakhstan
Medal record
Representing Kazakhstan
Asian Games
Gold medal – first place	2018 Jakarta	Team
Asian Championships
Silver medal – second place	2018 Kuala Lumpur	Team
Silver medal – second place	2019 Pattaya	Hoop
Silver medal – second place	2019 Pattaya	Clubs
Bronze medal – third place	2021 Tashkent	Ribbon
Bronze medal – third place	2019 Pattaya	All-around
Bronze medal – third place	2019 Pattaya	Ball
Bronze medal – third place	2019 Pattaya	Ribbon

Adilya Tlekenova (Адиля Сакеновна Тлекенова, born 17 July 2002) is a Kazakhstani rhythmic gymnast who won a gold medal in the team event at the 2018 Asian Games in Jakarta, Indonesia.
