= List of gymnasts at the 2020 Summer Olympics =

This is a list of the gymnasts who represented their respective countries at the 2020 Summer Olympics in Tokyo, Japan from 24 July – 8 August 2021. Gymnasts across three disciplines (artistic gymnastics, rhythmic gymnastics and trampoline) participated in the Games.

== Male artistic gymnasts ==
	Name	Country	Date of birth
Youngest competitor	Illia Kovtun	Ukraine	10 August 2003 (aged 17)
Oldest competitor	Marian Drăgulescu	Romania	18 December 1980 (aged 40)

=== Team ===
NOC	Name	Date of birth	Hometown	Reserves
Brazil	Francisco Barretto Júnior	31 October 1989 (aged 31)	Ribeirão Preto	
Brazil	Arthur Mariano	18 September 1993 (aged 27)	São Paulo	
Brazil	Diogo Soares	12 April 2002 (aged 19)	Piracicaba	
Brazil	Caio Souza	12 September 1993 (aged 27)	Volta Redonda	
China	Lin Chaopan	27 August 1995 (aged 25)	Quanzhou	Deng Shudi; Huang Mingqi (Note: Huang, Lan, and Weng are the alternates for Liu Yang's non-nominative individual spot.); Lan Xingyu; Weng Hao; Zhang Boheng
China	Sun Wei	12 August 1995 (aged 25)	Jiangsu	Deng Shudi; Huang Mingqi; Lan Xingyu; Weng Hao; Zhang Boheng
China	Xiao Ruoteng	30 January 1996 (aged 25)	Beijing	Deng Shudi; Huang Mingqi; Lan Xingyu; Weng Hao; Zhang Boheng
China	Zou Jingyuan	3 January 1998 (aged 23)	Yibin	Deng Shudi; Huang Mingqi; Lan Xingyu; Weng Hao; Zhang Boheng
Chinese Taipei	Hung Yuan-hsi (Note: Hung was added to the team after Yu Chao-wei withdrew due to injury.)	27 July 2001 (aged 19)	Taipei	
Chinese Taipei	Lee Chih-kai	3 April 1996 (aged 25)	Yilan	
Chinese Taipei	Shiao Yu-jan	9 December 1999 (aged 21)	Taipei	
Chinese Taipei	Tang Chia-hung	23 September 1996 (aged 24)	Taipei	
Germany	Lukas Dauser	15 June 1993 (aged 28)	Ebersberg	Nick Klessing
Germany	Nils Dunkel	20 February 1997 (aged 24)	Erfurt	Nick Klessing
Germany	Philipp Herder	21 October 1992 (aged 28)	Berlin	Nick Klessing
Germany	Andreas Toba	7 October 1990 (aged 30)	Hanover	Nick Klessing
Great Britain	Joe Fraser	6 December 1998 (aged 22)	Birmingham	Jake Jarman
Great Britain	James Hall	6 October 1995 (aged 25)	Maidstone	Jake Jarman
Great Britain	Giarnni Regini-Moran	2 August 1998 (aged 22)	Gravesend	Jake Jarman
Great Britain	Max Whitlock	13 January 1993 (aged 28)	Hemel Hempstead	Jake Jarman
Japan	Daiki Hashimoto	7 August 2001 (aged 19)	Chiba	
Japan	Kazuma Kaya	19 November 1996 (aged 24)	Funabashi	
Japan	Takeru Kitazono	21 October 2002 (aged 18)	Osaka	
Japan	Wataru Tanigawa	23 July 1996 (aged 25)	Funabashi	
ROC (Note: Teams and athletes from Russia will compete under the acronym "ROC" at the 2020 Summer Olympics due to doping sanctions against the country.)	Denis Ablyazin	3 August 1992 (aged 28)	Penza	
ROC	David Belyavskiy	23 February 1992 (aged 29)	Yekaterinburg	
ROC	Artur Dalaloyan	26 April 1996 (aged 25)	Moscow	
ROC	Nikita Nagornyy	12 February 1997 (aged 24)	Rostov-on-Don	
South Korea	Kim Han-sol	29 December 1995 (aged 25)	Seoul	Lee Jung-hyo
South Korea	Lee Jun-ho	22 October 1995 (aged 25)	Seoul	Lee Jung-hyo
South Korea	Ryu Sung-hyun	22 October 2002 (aged 18)	Seoul	Lee Jung-hyo
South Korea	Yang Hak-seon	6 December 1992 (aged 28)	Gwangju	Lee Jung-hyo
Spain	Néstor Abad	29 March 1993 (aged 28)	Madrid	
Spain	Thierno Diallo	22 November 2000 (aged 20)	Manresa	
Spain	Nicolau Mir	10 May 2000 (aged 21)	Palma de Mallorca	
Spain	Joel Plata	20 March 1998 (aged 23)	Barcelona	
Switzerland	Christian Baumann	25 February 1995 (aged 26)	Leutwil	
Switzerland	Pablo Brägger	27 November 1992 (aged 28)	Oberbüren	
Switzerland	Benjamin Gischard	17 November 1995 (aged 25)	Herzogenbuchsee	
Switzerland	Eddy Yusof	2 October 1994 (aged 26)	Bülach	
Ukraine	Illia Kovtun	10 August 2003 (aged 17)	Cherkasy	
Ukraine	Petro Pakhniuk	26 November 1991 (aged 29)	Kyiv	
Ukraine	Igor Radivilov	19 October 1992 (aged 28)	Mariupol	
Ukraine	Yevgen Yudenkov	10 April 1993 (aged 28)	Donetsk	
United States	Brody Malone	7 January 2000 (aged 21)	Summerville, Georgia	Cameron Bock; Allan Bower; Brandon Briones; Alex Diab (Note: Diab is the alternate for Alec Yoder's non-nominative spot.); Akash Modi
United States	Sam Mikulak	13 October 1992 (aged 28)	Newport Beach, California	Cameron Bock; Allan Bower; Brandon Briones; Alex Diab; Akash Modi
United States	Yul Moldauer	24 August 1996 (aged 24)	Arvada, Colorado	Cameron Bock; Allan Bower; Brandon Briones; Alex Diab; Akash Modi
United States	Shane Wiskus	1 October 1998 (aged 22)	Spring Park, Minnesota	Cameron Bock; Allan Bower; Brandon Briones; Alex Diab; Akash Modi

=== Individual ===
NOC	Name	Date of birth	Hometown
Albania	Matvei Petrov	16 July 1990 (aged 31)	Prague, Czech Republic
Armenia	Artur Davtyan	8 August 1992 (aged 28)	Yerevan
Australia	Tyson Bull	21 May 1993 (aged 28)	Melbourne
Azerbaijan	Ivan Tikhonov	21 April 1996 (aged 25)	Syzran, Russia
Brazil	Arthur Zanetti	16 April 1990 (aged 31)	São Caetano do Sul
Bulgaria	David Huddleston	9 August 2000 (aged 20)	The Hague, Netherlands
Canada	René Cournoyer	23 April 1997 (aged 24)	Repentigny, Quebec
Chile	Tomás González (Note: González received Manrique Larduet’s spot after Larduet announced his retirement.)	22 November 1985 (aged 35)	Santiago
China	Liu Yang	10 September 1994 (aged 26)	Anshan
China	You Hao	26 April 1992 (aged 29)	Xuzhou
Croatia	Tin Srbić	11 September 1996 (aged 24)	Zagreb
Cyprus	Marios Georgiou	10 November 1997 (aged 23)	Limassol
Czech Republic	David Jessen (Note: Jessen received Andrey Likhavitski's spot after Likhavitski withdrew.)	5 December 1996 (aged 24)	Plantation, U.S.
Egypt	Omar Mohamed	10 February 1999 (aged 22)	Alexandria
France	Samir Aït Saïd	1 November 1989 (aged 31)	Champigny-sur-Marne
France	Loris Frasca	3 July 1995 (aged 26)	Forbach
France	Cyril Tommasone	4 July 1987 (aged 34)	Villeurbanne
Greece	Eleftherios Petrounias	30 November 1990 (aged 30)	Athens
Hong Kong	Shek Wai Hung	10 October 1991 (aged 29)	Hong Kong
Ireland	Rhys McClenaghan	21 July 1999 (aged 22)	Newtownards, U.K.
Israel	Artem Dolgopyat	16 June 1997 (aged 24)	Dnipro, Ukraine
Israel	Alexander Shatilov	22 March 1987 (aged 34)	Tashkent, Uzbekistan
Italy	Ludovico Edalli	18 December 1993 (aged 27)	Busto Arsizio
Italy	Marco Lodadio	24 March 1992 (aged 29)	Frascati
Japan	Kohei Kameyama	28 December 1988 (aged 32)	Sendai
Japan	Kōhei Uchimura	3 January 1989 (aged 32)	Isahaya
Kazakhstan	Milad Karimi	21 June 1999 (aged 22)	Almaty
Lithuania	Robert Tvorogal	5 October 1994 (aged 26)	Vilnius
Malaysia	Loo Phay Xing	28 September 1997 (aged 23)	Penang
Mexico	Daniel Corral	25 January 1990 (aged 31)	Ensenada
Netherlands	Bart Deurloo	23 February 1991 (aged 30)	Ridderkerk
Netherlands	Epke Zonderland	16 April 1986 (aged 35)	Heerenveen
New Zealand	Mikhail Koudinov	23 June 1991 (aged 30)	Vladivostok, Russia
Nigeria	Uche Eke	12 August 1997 (aged 23)	Brookeville, U.S.
Norway	Sofus Heggemsnes	13 July 1999 (aged 22)	Oslo
Philippines	Carlos Yulo	16 February 2000 (aged 21)	Malate
Romania	Marian Drăgulescu	18 December 1980 (aged 40)	Bucharest
ROC	Aleksandr Kartsev	31 December 2001 (aged 19)	Vladimir
ROC	Vladislav Polyashov	4 April 1995 (aged 26)	Cheboksary
South Korea	Shin Jae-hwan	3 March 1998 (aged 23)	Seoul
Spain	Rayderley Zapata	26 May 1993 (aged 28)	Las Palmas
Sweden	David Rumbutis	17 March 2000 (aged 21)	Älvsbyn
Turkey	Ferhat Arıcan	28 July 1993 (aged 27)	İzmir
Turkey	Adem Asil	21 February 1999 (aged 22)	Alexandria, Egypt
Turkey	İbrahim Çolak	7 January 1995 (aged 26)	İzmir
Turkey	Ahmet Önder	11 July 1996 (aged 25)	Istanbul
United States	Alec Yoder	21 January 1997 (aged 24)	Indianapolis, Indiana
Uzbekistan	Rasuljon Abdurakhimov	10 October 1996 (aged 24)	Tashkent
Vietnam	Đinh Phương Thành	3 September 1995 (aged 25)	Hanoi
Vietnam	Lê Thanh Tùng	24 October 1995 (aged 25)	Ho Chi Minh City

== Female artistic gymnasts ==
	Name	Country	Date of birth
Youngest competitor	Jutta Verkest	Belgium	11 October 2005 (aged 15)
Oldest competitor	Oksana Chusovitina	Uzbekistan	19 June 1975 (aged 46)

=== Team ===
NOC	Name	Date of birth	Hometown	Reserves
Belgium	Maellyse Brassart	22 June 2001 (aged 20)	Uccle	Fien Enghels; Noémie Louon
Belgium	Nina Derwael	26 March 2000 (aged 21)	Sint-Truiden	Fien Enghels; Noémie Louon
Belgium	Lisa Vaelen	10 August 2004 (aged 16)	Bonheiden	Fien Enghels; Noémie Louon
Belgium	Jutta Verkest	11 October 2005 (aged 15)	Mechelen	Fien Enghels; Noémie Louon
Canada	Ellie Black	8 September 1995 (aged 25)	Halifax, Nova Scotia	Laurie Denommée; Emma Spence; Rose-Kaying Woo; Victoria-Kayen Woo
Canada	Brooklyn Moors	23 February 2001 (aged 20)	Cambridge, Ontario	Laurie Denommée; Emma Spence; Rose-Kaying Woo; Victoria-Kayen Woo
Canada	Shallon Olsen	10 July 2000 (aged 21)	Surrey, British Columbia	Laurie Denommée; Emma Spence; Rose-Kaying Woo; Victoria-Kayen Woo
Canada	Ava Stewart	30 September 2005 (aged 15)	Bowmanville, Ontario	Laurie Denommée; Emma Spence; Rose-Kaying Woo; Victoria-Kayen Woo
China	Lu Yufei	28 March 2000 (aged 21)	Zhengzhou	He Licheng; Liu Tingting; Luo Rui; Qi Qi; Wei Xiaoyuan
China	Ou Yushan	13 January 2004 (aged 17)	Guangdong	He Licheng; Liu Tingting; Luo Rui; Qi Qi; Wei Xiaoyuan
China	Tang Xijing	3 January 2003 (aged 18)	Beijing	He Licheng; Liu Tingting; Luo Rui; Qi Qi; Wei Xiaoyuan
China	Zhang Jin	25 November 2000 (aged 20)	Shanghai	He Licheng; Liu Tingting; Luo Rui; Qi Qi; Wei Xiaoyuan
France	Marine Boyer	22 May 2000 (aged 21)	Saint-Benoît, Réunion	Coline Devillard; Célia Serber
France	Mélanie de Jesus dos Santos	5 March 2000 (aged 21)	Schœlcher, Martinique	Coline Devillard; Célia Serber
France	Aline Friess	5 July 2003 (aged 18)	Obernai	Coline Devillard; Célia Serber
France	Carolann Héduit	2 December 2003 (aged 17)	Angers	Coline Devillard; Célia Serber
Germany	Kim Bui	20 January 1989 (aged 32)	Ehningen	Emelie Petz
Germany	Pauline Schäfer	4 January 1997 (aged 24)	Chemnitz	Emelie Petz
Germany	Elisabeth Seitz	4 November 1993 (aged 27)	Stuttgart	Emelie Petz
Germany	Sarah Voss	21 October 1999 (aged 21)	Dormagen	Emelie Petz
Great Britain	Jennifer Gadirova	3 October 2004 (aged 16)	Aylesbury	Georgia-Mae Fenton
Great Britain	Jessica Gadirova	3 October 2004 (aged 16)	Aylesbury	Georgia-Mae Fenton
Great Britain	Alice Kinsella	13 March 2001 (aged 20)	Birmingham	Georgia-Mae Fenton
Great Britain	Amelie Morgan	31 May 2003 (aged 18)	Portishead	Georgia-Mae Fenton
Italy	Alice D'Amato	7 February 2003 (aged 18)	Genoa	
Italy	Asia D'Amato	7 February 2003 (aged 18)	Genoa	
Italy	Vanessa Ferrari (Note: Ferrari, who originally qualified to the Games as an individual, replaced Giorgia Villa on the team after Villa withdrew due to injury.)	10 November 1990 (aged 30)	Genivolta	
Italy	Martina Maggio	26 July 2001 (aged 19)	Villasanta	
Japan	Hitomi Hatakeda	1 September 2000 (aged 20)	Tokyo	Asuka Teramoto
Japan	Yuna Hiraiwa	21 November 1998 (aged 22)	Tokyo	Asuka Teramoto
Japan	Mai Murakami	5 August 1996 (aged 24)	Sagamihara	Asuka Teramoto
Japan	Aiko Sugihara	19 September 1999 (aged 21)	Higashiōsaka	Asuka Teramoto
Netherlands	Eythora Thorsdottir	10 August 1998 (aged 22)	Poortugaal	Elze Geurts; Naomi Visser
Netherlands	Vera van Pol	17 December 1993 (aged 27)	Amsterdam	Elze Geurts; Naomi Visser
Netherlands	Lieke Wevers	17 September 1991 (aged 29)	Heerenveen	Elze Geurts; Naomi Visser
Netherlands	Sanne Wevers	17 September 1991 (aged 29)	Heerenveen	Elze Geurts; Naomi Visser
ROC	Lilia Akhaimova	17 March 1997 (aged 24)	Saint Petersburg	
ROC	Viktoria Listunova	12 May 2005 (aged 16)	Moscow	
ROC	Angelina Melnikova	18 July 2000 (aged 21)	Voronezh	
ROC	Vladislava Urazova	14 August 2004 (aged 16)	Rostov-on-Don	
Spain	Laura Bechdejú	9 May 2000 (aged 21)	Girona	
Spain	Marina González	15 December 2002 (aged 18)	Malgrat de Mar	
Spain	Alba Petisco	1 February 2003 (aged 18)	Villarino de los Aires	
Spain	Roxana Popa	2 June 1997 (aged 24)	Madrid	
United States	Simone Biles	14 March 1997 (aged 24)	Spring, Texas	Kayla DiCello; Kara Eaker; Emma Malabuyo; Leanne Wong
United States	Jordan Chiles	15 April 2001 (aged 20)	Vancouver, Washington	Kayla DiCello; Kara Eaker; Emma Malabuyo; Leanne Wong
United States	Sunisa Lee	9 March 2003 (aged 18)	Saint Paul, Minnesota	Kayla DiCello; Kara Eaker; Emma Malabuyo; Leanne Wong
United States	Grace McCallum	30 October 2002 (aged 18)	Isanti, Minnesota	Kayla DiCello; Kara Eaker; Emma Malabuyo; Leanne Wong

=== Individual ===
NOC	Name	Date of birth	Hometown
Argentina	Abigail Magistrati (Note: Magistrati received compatriot Martina Dominici's spot after Dominici tested positive for a banned substance in June.)	29 December 2003 (aged 17)	La Plata
Australia	Georgia Godwin	28 October 1997 (aged 23)	Southport
Australia	Emily Whitehead	11 December 2000 (aged 20)	Mornington
Austria	Elisa Hämmerle	10 December 1995 (aged 25)	Lustenau
Azerbaijan	Marina Nekrasova	19 April 1995 (aged 26)	Voronezh, Russia
Belarus	Hanna Traukova (Note: Traukova received Anastasiya Alistratava's spot after Alistratava withdrew.)	1 August 2001 (aged 19)	Grodno
Brazil	Rebeca Andrade	8 May 1999 (aged 22)	Guarulhos
Brazil	Flávia Saraiva	30 September 1999 (aged 21)	Rio de Janeiro
Cayman Islands	Raegan Rutty	14 January 2002 (aged 19)	East End
Chile	Simona Castro	11 January 1989 (aged 32)	Santiago
China	Fan Yilin	11 November 1999 (aged 21)	Shanghai
China	Guan Chenchen	25 September 2004 (aged 16)	Hubei
Chinese Taipei	Ting Hua-tien	11 October 2002 (aged 18)	Taipei
Costa Rica	Luciana Alvarado	16 September 2002 (aged 18)	San José
Croatia	Ana Đerek	4 September 1998 (aged 22)	Split
Cuba	Marcia Vidiaux	21 July 1999 (aged 22)	Manzanillo
Czech Republic	Aneta Holasová	22 February 2001 (aged 20)	Prague
Egypt	Zeina Ibrahim	20 June 2003 (aged 18)	Alexandria
Egypt	Mandy Mohamed	23 February 2000 (aged 21)	Haarlemmermeer, Netherlands
Hungary	Zsófia Kovács	6 April 2000 (aged 21)	Dunaújváros
India	Pranati Nayak	6 April 1995 (aged 26)	Pingla
Ireland	Megan Ryan (Note: Ryan received Kim Su-jong’s spot after North Korea withdrew from the Games.)	3 April 2002 (aged 19)	Cork
Israel	Lihie Raz	14 September 2003 (aged 17)	Ramat HaSharon
Italy	Lara Mori (Note: Mori received Vanessa Ferrari’s individual spot after Ferrari was named to the Italian team.)	26 July 1998 (aged 22)	Montevarchi
Jamaica	Danusia Francis	13 May 1994 (aged 27)	Kenilworth, U.K.
Japan	Urara Ashikawa	8 March 2003 (aged 18)	Fuji
Malaysia	Farah Ann Abdul Hadi	3 May 1994 (aged 27)	Subang Jaya
Mexico	Alexa Moreno	8 August 1994 (aged 26)	Mexicali
Norway	Julie Erichsen	15 August 2001 (aged 19)	Bergen
Peru	Ariana Orrego	25 September 1998 (aged 22)	Lima
Poland	Gabriela Janik	10 March 1993 (aged 28)	Kraków
Portugal	Filipa Martins	9 January 1996 (aged 25)	Porto
Romania	Maria Holbură	16 September 2000 (aged 20)	Constanța
Romania	Larisa Iordache	19 June 1996 (aged 25)	Bucharest
ROC	Elena Gerasimova	21 June 2004 (aged 17)	Cheboksary
ROC	Anastasia Ilyankova	12 January 2001 (aged 20)	Leninsk-Kuznetsky
Singapore	Tan Sze En	19 October 2000 (aged 20)	Singapore
Slovakia	Barbora Mokošová	10 March 1997 (aged 24)	Bratislava
South Africa	Naveen Daries	29 October 2001 (aged 19)	Johannesburg
South Africa	Caitlin Rooskrantz	5 November 2001 (aged 19)	Johannesburg
South Korea	Lee Yun-seo	5 March 2003 (aged 18)	Seoul
South Korea	Yeo Seo-jeong	20 February 2002 (aged 19)	Yongin
Sri Lanka	Milka Gehani	24 April 2003 (aged 18)	Colombo
Sweden	Jonna Adlerteg	6 June 1995 (aged 26)	Eskilstuna
Switzerland	Giulia Steingruber	24 March 1994 (aged 27)	Gossau
Turkey	Nazlı Savranbaşı	9 October 2003 (aged 17)	İzmir
Ukraine	Diana Varinska	22 March 2001 (aged 20)	Kyiv
United States	Jade Carey	27 May 2000 (aged 21)	Phoenix, Arizona
United States	MyKayla Skinner	9 December 1996 (aged 24)	Gilbert, Arizona
Uzbekistan	Oksana Chusovitina	19 June 1975 (aged 46)	Tashkent

== Rhythmic gymnasts ==
	Name	Country	Date of birth
Youngest competitor	Laman Alimuradova	Azerbaijan	29 November 2004 (aged 16)
Oldest competitor	Rut Castillo	Mexico	16 September 1990 (aged 30)

=== Individual ===
NOC	Name	Date of birth	Hometown
Australia	Lidiia Iakovleva	28 August 2003 (aged 17)	Brisbane
Azerbaijan	Zohra Aghamirova	8 August 2001 (aged 19)	Baku
Belarus	Alina Harnasko	9 August 2001 (aged 19)	Minsk
Belarus	Anastasiia Salos	18 February 2002 (aged 19)	Barnaul, Russia
Bulgaria	Boryana Kaleyn	23 August 2000 (aged 20)	Sofia
Bulgaria	Katrin Taseva	24 November 1997 (aged 23)	Samokov
Cape Verde	Márcia Lopes	6 December 2001 (aged 19)	São Vicente
Egypt	Habiba Marzouk	14 May 2002 (aged 19)	Cairo
Georgia	Salome Pazhava	3 September 1997 (aged 23)	Tbilisi
Hungary	Fanni Pigniczki	23 January 2000 (aged 21)	Budapest
Israel	Linoy Ashram	13 May 1999 (aged 22)	Rishon LeZion
Israel	Nicol Zelikman	30 January 2001 (aged 20)	Kfar Saba
Italy	Alexandra Agiurgiuculese	15 January 2001 (aged 20)	Udine
Italy	Milena Baldassarri	16 October 2001 (aged 19)	Ravenna
Japan	Sumire Kita	11 January 2001 (aged 20)	Tokyo
Japan	Chisaki Oiwa	20 November 2001 (aged 19)	Noda
Kazakhstan	Alina Adilkhanova	26 September 2001 (aged 19)	Karaganda
Mexico	Rut Castillo	16 September 1990 (aged 30)	Guadalajara
ROC	Arina Averina	13 August 1998 (aged 22)	Moscow
ROC	Dina Averina	13 August 1998 (aged 22)	Moscow
Slovenia	Ekaterina Vedeneeva	23 June 1994 (aged 27)	Irkutsk, Russia
Ukraine	Viktoriia Onopriienko	18 October 2003 (aged 17)	Kyiv
Ukraine	Khrystyna Pohranychna	13 May 2003 (aged 18)	Lviv
United States	Evita Griskenas	3 December 2000 (aged 20)	Orland Park, Illinois
United States	Laura Zeng	14 October 1999 (aged 21)	Libertyville, Illinois
Uzbekistan	Ekaterina Fetisova	3 January 2003 (aged 18)	Tashkent

=== Group ===
NOC	Name	Date of birth	Hometown	Reserves
Australia	Emily Abbot	28 February 1997 (aged 24)	Adelaide	Alexandra Eedle
Australia	Alexandra Aristoteli	24 May 1997 (aged 24)	Bankstown	Alexandra Eedle
Australia	Alannah Mathews	9 April 1999 (aged 22)	Attadale	Alexandra Eedle
Australia	Himeka Onoda	5 March 1998 (aged 23)	Brisbane	Alexandra Eedle
Australia	Felicity White	25 September 2000 (aged 20)	Sunnybank	Alexandra Eedle
Azerbaijan	Laman Alimuradova	29 November 2004 (aged 16)	Baku	
Azerbaijan	Zeynab Hummatova	6 December 1999 (aged 21)	Shaki	
Azerbaijan	Yelyzaveta Luzan	14 March 2003 (aged 18)	Baku	
Azerbaijan	Narmina Samadova	10 June 2004 (aged 17)	Baku	
Azerbaijan	Darya Sorokina	29 November 2002 (aged 18)	Baku	
Belarus	Hanna Haidukevich	26 March 2001 (aged 20)	Minsk	Hanna Shvaiba
Belarus	Anastasiya Malakanava	1 May 2003 (aged 18)	Minsk	Hanna Shvaiba
Belarus	Anastasiya Rybakova	23 April 2000 (aged 21)	Grodno	Hanna Shvaiba
Belarus	Arina Tsitsilina	9 October 1998 (aged 22)	Barnaul, Russia	Hanna Shvaiba
Belarus	Karyna Yarmolenka	4 May 2000 (aged 21)	Minsk	Hanna Shvaiba
Brazil	Maria Eduarda Arakaki	12 August 2003 (aged 17)	Maceió	Barbara Galvão; Gabrielle Moraes
Brazil	Beatriz Linhares	4 February 2003 (aged 18)	Florianópolis	Barbara Galvão; Gabrielle Moraes
Brazil	Déborah Medrado	13 July 2002 (aged 19)	Serra	Barbara Galvão; Gabrielle Moraes
Brazil	Nicole Pírcio	24 July 2002 (aged 19)	Londrina	Barbara Galvão; Gabrielle Moraes
Brazil	Geovanna Santos	15 February 2002 (aged 19)	Pinheiros	Barbara Galvão; Gabrielle Moraes
Bulgaria	Simona Dyankova	7 December 1994 (aged 26)	Varna	
Bulgaria	Stefani Kiryakova	15 January 2001 (aged 20)	Burgas	
Bulgaria	Madlen Radukanova	14 May 2000 (aged 21)	Sofia	
Bulgaria	Laura Traets	13 December 1998 (aged 22)	Sofia	
Bulgaria	Erika Zafirova	7 May 1999 (aged 22)	Kyustendil	
China	Guo Qiqi	7 August 1998 (aged 22)	Shanghai	
China	Hao Ting	23 March 2001 (aged 20)	Nanjing	
China	Huang Zhangjiayang	15 February 2000 (aged 21)	Chengdu	
China	Liu Xin	12 October 1999 (aged 21)	Shanghai	
China	Xu Yanshu	14 July 1998 (aged 23)	Liaoning	
Egypt	Login Elsasyed	1 January 2003 (aged 18)	Alexandria	
Egypt	Polina Fouda	17 June 2003 (aged 18)	Latvia	
Egypt	Salma Saleh	19 December 2003 (aged 17)	Cairo	
Egypt	Malak Selim	1 May 2003 (aged 18)	Giza	
Egypt	Tia Sobhy	7 February 2003 (aged 18)	Cairo	
Israel	Ofir Dayan	12 March 2000 (aged 21)	Rishon LeZion	
Israel	Yana Kramarenko	11 June 2002 (aged 19)	Holon	
Israel	Natalie Raits	1 July 2002 (aged 19)	Petach-Tikva	
Israel	Yuliana Telegina	22 March 2002 (aged 19)	Tel Aviv	
Israel	Karin Vexman	16 December 2001 (aged 19)	Holon	
Italy	Martina Centofanti	19 May 1998 (aged 23)	Rome	
Italy	Agnese Duranti	18 December 2000 (aged 20)	Spoleto	
Italy	Alessia Maurelli	22 August 1996 (aged 24)	Rivoli	
Italy	Daniela Mogurean	16 July 2001 (aged 20)	Padua	
Italy	Martina Santandrea	5 September 1999 (aged 21)	Bentivoglio	
Japan	Sakura Noshitani	29 September 1997 (aged 23)	Tokyo	Rinako Inaki; Rie Matsubara
Japan	Sayuri Sugimoto	25 January 1996 (aged 25)	Nagoya	Rinako Inaki; Rie Matsubara
Japan	Ayuka Suzuki	27 September 1999 (aged 21)	Anpachi	Rinako Inaki; Rie Matsubara
Japan	Nanami Takenaka	2 December 1998 (aged 22)	Nagoya	Rinako Inaki; Rie Matsubara
Japan	Kiko Yokota	11 May 1997 (aged 24)	Tokyo	Rinako Inaki; Rie Matsubara
ROC	Anastasia Bliznyuk	28 June 1994 (aged 27)	Penza	
ROC	Anastasia Maksimova	27 June 1991 (aged 30)	Nizhny Novgorod	
ROC	Angelina Shkatova	25 January 2001 (aged 20)	Vladimir	
ROC	Anastasia Tatareva	19 July 1997 (aged 24)	Moscow	
ROC	Alisa Tishchenko	17 February 2004 (aged 17)	Krasnodar	
Ukraine	Mariola Bodnarchuk	23 March 2002 (aged 19)	Lviv	
Ukraine	Daryna Duda	29 November 2003 (aged 17)	Kyiv	
Ukraine	Yeva Meleshchuk	29 September 2001 (aged 19)	Kyiv	
Ukraine	Anastasiya Voznyak	9 December 1998 (aged 22)	Lviv	
Ukraine	Mariia Vysochanska	10 September 2002 (aged 18)	Lviv	
United States	Isabelle Connor	22 July 2000 (aged 21)	Manhattan Beach, California	Yelyzaveta Merenzon; Gergana Petkova
United States	Camilla Feeley	14 November 1999 (aged 21)	Wheeling, Illinois	Yelyzaveta Merenzon; Gergana Petkova
United States	Lili Mizuno	4 February 2001 (aged 20)	Northbrook, Illinois	Yelyzaveta Merenzon; Gergana Petkova
United States	Elizaveta Pletneva	21 January 2002 (aged 19)	Wheeling, Illinois	Yelyzaveta Merenzon; Gergana Petkova
United States	Nicole Sladkov	2 November 1999 (aged 21)	Vernon Hills, Illinois	Yelyzaveta Merenzon; Gergana Petkova
Uzbekistan	Kseniia Aleksandrova	8 September 2000 (aged 20)	Samarkand	
Uzbekistan	Kamola Irnazarova	25 April 2002 (aged 19)	Tashkent	
Uzbekistan	Dinara Ravshanbekova	25 September 1999 (aged 21)	Tashkent	
Uzbekistan	Sevara Safoeva	19 November 2002 (aged 18)	Navoiy	
Uzbekistan	Nilufar Shomuradova	7 July 1999 (aged 22)	Navoiy	

== Male trampoline gymnasts ==
	Name	Country	Date of birth
Youngest competitor	Ivan Litvinovich	Belarus	26 June 2001 (aged 20)
Oldest competitor	Dmitry Ushakov	ROC	15 August 1988 (aged 32)

NOC	Name	Date of birth	Hometown	Reserves
Australia	Dominic Clarke	4 January 1997 (aged 24)	Sydney	
Belarus	Uladzislau Hancharou	2 December 1995 (aged 25)	Vitebsk	
Belarus	Ivan Litvinovich	26 June 2001 (aged 20)	Vileyka	
China	Dong Dong	13 April 1989 (aged 32)	Taiyuan	Wang Xiaoying; Yan Langyu
China	Gao Lei	3 January 1992 (aged 29)	Shanghai	Wang Xiaoying; Yan Langyu
Colombia	Ángel Hernández	6 January 1995 (aged 26)	Albacete, Spain	
Egypt	Seif Asser Sherif	14 April 1995 (aged 26)	Giza	
France	Allan Morante	13 August 1994 (aged 26)	Drancy	Julian Chartier
Japan	Ryosuke Sakai	24 July 1997 (aged 24)	Kanagawa	
Japan	Daiki Kishi	22 September 1994 (aged 26)	Komatsu	
New Zealand	Dylan Schmidt	7 January 1997 (aged 24)	Southport	
Portugal	Diogo Abreu	5 September 1993 (aged 27)	Lisbon	Pedro Ferreira
ROC	Dmitry Ushakov	15 August 1988 (aged 32)	Krasnodar	
ROC	Andrey Yudin	6 June 1996 (aged 25)	Tolyatti	
Ukraine	Mykola Prostorov	18 December 1994 (aged 26)	Kherson	
United States	Aliaksei Shostak	8 February 1995 (aged 26)	Lafayette, Louisiana	N/A

== Female trampoline gymnasts ==
	Name	Country	Date of birth
Youngest competitor	Iana Lebedeva	ROC	19 December 2001 (aged 19)
Oldest competitor	Rosie MacLennan	Canada	28 August 1988 (aged 32)

NOC	Name	Date of birth	Hometown	Reserves
Australia	Jessica Pickering	24 April 2001 (aged 20)	North Gosford	
Canada	Rosie MacLennan	28 August 1988 (aged 32)	King City, Ontario	Sophiane Méthot; Sarah Milette
Canada	Samantha Smith	1 April 1992 (aged 29)	Toronto, Ontario	Sophiane Méthot; Sarah Milette
China	Liu Lingling	8 November 1994 (aged 26)	Fuzhou	Huang Yanfei; Lin Qianqi
China	Zhu Xueying	2 March 1998 (aged 23)	Beijing	Huang Yanfei; Lin Qianqi
Egypt	Malak Hamza	5 November 2001 (aged 19)	Giza	
France	Léa Labrousse	6 April 1997 (aged 24)	Chamalières	Marine Jurbert
Great Britain	Laura Gallagher	26 March 1989 (aged 32)	Bridgwater	
Great Britain	Bryony Page	10 December 1990 (aged 30)	Sheffield	
Japan	Hikaru Mori	7 July 1999 (aged 22)	Tokyo	
Japan	Megu Uyama	14 January 1996 (aged 25)	Kanazawa	
Mexico	Dafne Navarro	30 January 1996 (aged 25)	Guadalajara	
New Zealand	Madaline Davidson	8 January 1999 (aged 22)	Christchurch	
ROC	Susana Kochesok	25 February 1995 (aged 26)	Krasnodar	
ROC	Iana Lebedeva	19 December 2001 (aged 19)	Saint Petersburg	
United States	Nicole Ahsinger	12 May 1998 (aged 23)	San Diego, California	Charlotte Drury; Sarah Webster
