= Himeka (disambiguation) =

Himeka may refer to:

- Himeka, a Canadian singer
- Himeka Arano, member of the idol group SKE48
- Himeka Arita, a Japanese professional wrestler
- Himeka Nakamoto, former member of the idol group Nogizaka46
- Himeka Onoda, an Australian rhythmic gymnast
- Himeka Saiki, a fictional character from The 100 Girlfriends Who Really, Really, Really, Really, Really Love You
