= Anzhelika Stubailo =

Russian rhythmic gymnast (born 2001)

- Full name: Anzhelika Vadimovna Stubailo
- Alternative name: Angelika Stubaylo
- Born: 5 September 2001 (age 25) Volgograd, Russia
- Height: 177 cm (5 ft 10 in)

Gymnastics career
- Discipline: Rhythmic gymnastics
- Country represented: Russia (2019)
- Gym: Novogorsk
- Head coach: Irina Viner
Medal record
Representing Russia
Group Rhythmic Gymnastics
World Championships
Gold medal – first place	2019 Baku	Group all-around
Gold medal – first place	2019 Baku	3 Hoops + 4 clubs
Bronze medal – third place	2019 Baku	5 Balls
European Games
Gold medal – first place	2019 Minsk	5 Balls
Bronze medal – third place	2019 Minsk	Group all-around

Anzhelika Vadimovna Stubailo (Russian: Анжелика Вадимовна Стубайло; born 5 September 2001) is a Russian television presenter and retired group rhythmic gymnast. She is a 2019 World champion in the group all-around and 3 hoops + 4 clubs. She is also a 2019 European Games 5 balls champion and all-around bronze medalist.

== Early life ==
Anzhelika Stubailo was born on 5 September 2001, in Volgograd. She began rhythmic gymnastics when she was 3 years old. When she was 11, she moved to Moscow without her parents to train at the Olympic Training Center.

== Career ==
Stubailo joined the main group of Russia's national rhythmic gymnastics team in 2019. She competed at the 2019 European Games in Minsk along with Vera Biryukova, Anastasia Maksimova, Anastasia Shishmakova, and Maria Tolkacheva. They won the gold medal in the group 5 balls event with a score of 27.300, but they only placed 5th in the group 3 hoops and 4 clubs. They won the bronze medal in the group all-around behind the Belarusian and Bulgarian groups.

Stubailo then competed at the 2019 World Championships in Baku alongside Evgeniia Levanova, Maksimova, Shishmakova, and Tolkacheva. They won the gold medal in the group all-around and qualified for both of the group apparatus finals. They won the bronze medal in 5 Balls behind the Japanese and Bulgarian groups, and won the gold medal in the 3 Hoops and 4 Clubs.

Stubailo had two surgeries after the 2019 World Championships and ended her gymnastics career. In 2022, she began working as a television presenter for Match TV. In April 2024, she began hosting TNT's weekday morning show.

== Extrernal links ==
- Anzhelika Stubailo at World Gymnastics
