= 2019 Rhythmic Gymnastics World Championships =

37th Rhythmic Gymnastics World Championships
- Venue: National Gymnastics Arena
- Location: Baku, Azerbaijan
- Dates: September 16–22
- Competitors: 301 from 61 nations

The 2019 Rhythmic Gymnastics World Championships were held in Baku, Azerbaijan from 16 to 22 September 2019. The competition took place at the National Gymnastics Arena and served as a qualifier for the 2020 Olympic Games. There were Olympic berths awarded to 16 individuals and 5 groups. There were 301 participating athletes from 61 countries.

Dina Averina from Russia won gold medals in ball, clubs, and ribbon, and Ekaterina Selezneva won the hoop title. Averina, Selezneva and Arina Averina won Russia's tenth consecutive World team title. In the all-around finals, Dina Averina won her third consecutive World all-around title, becoming the fifth rhythmic gymnast to do so. The Russian group then won their fourth consecutive all-around title, and Japan matched their best-ever result with the silver medal. Japan then won the gold medal in 5 balls, their first ever gold medal in the group event, and Russia won the 3 hoops + 4 clubs final.

== Participating nations ==
Participants	Nations
Group + 4 individuals	Azerbaijan Estonia Hungary Israel Italy Mexico
Group + 3 individuals	Belarus Bulgaria Canada China Spain Finland France Greece Japan Kazakhstan Russia Ukraine; United States Uzbekistan
Group + 2 individuals	Brazil North Korea
Group + 1 individual	Poland
Group	Germany
4 individuals	Egypt South Korea Lithuania Moldova Norway Portugal Slovenia
3 individuals	Angola Australia Austria Colombia Croatia Denmark Georgia Latvia Malaysia Romania South Africa San Marino; Sweden Turkey
2 individuals	Bolivia Czech Republic Kyrgyzstan Mongolia Montenegro Puerto Rico Slovakia Thailand
1 individual	Andorra Belgium Cape Verde Lebanon North Macedonia Serbia Sri Lanka

== Schedule ==
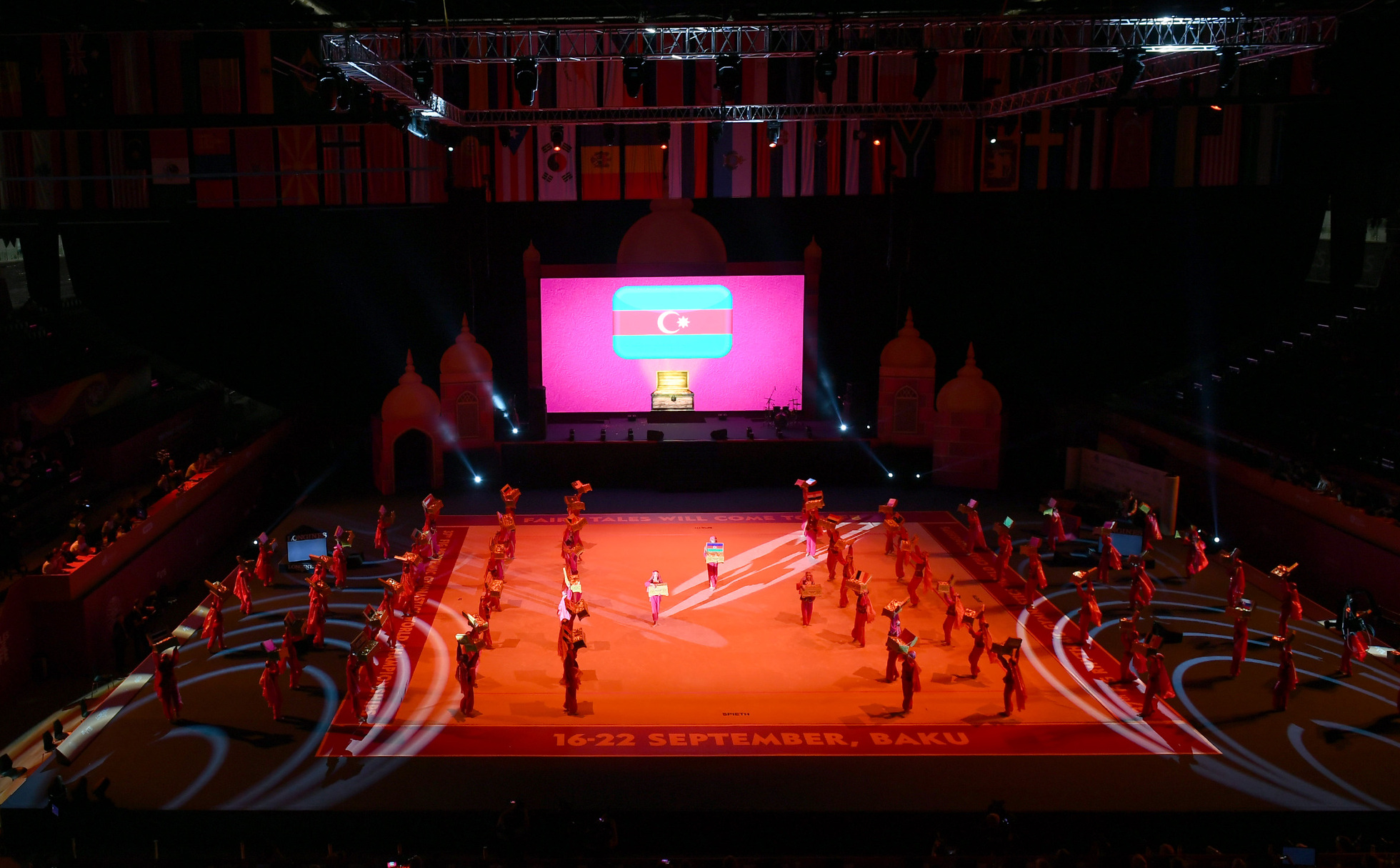
Opening ceremony of 37th FIG Rhythmic Gymnastics World Championships

- Monday, September 16
  - 12:00 - 18:50 Individual Qualification - Hoop and Ball
  - 19:15 - 20:00 Opening Ceremony
- Tuesday, September 17
  - 10:00 - 17:00 Individual Qualification - Hoop and Ball
  - 19:30 - 20:00 Individual Hoop Final
  - 20:05 - 20:35 Individual Ball Final
- Wednesday, September 18
  - 12:00 - 20:50 Individual Qualification - Clubs and Ribbon
- Thursday, September 19
  - 09:00 - 17:50 Individual Qualification - Clubs and Ribbon
  - 19:30 - 20:00 Individual Clubs Final
  - 20:05 - 20:35 Individual Ribbon Final
- Friday, September 20
  - 14:30 - 20:35 Individual All Around Final
- Saturday, September 21
  - 14:30 - 18:10 Group All Around
- Sunday, September 22
  - 14:30 - 15:15 Group 5 Balls Final
  - 15:15 - 16:00 Group 3 Hoops and 2 Pairs of Clubs Final
  - 16:15 - 16:45 Closing Ceremony

== Medal summary ==
Event	Gold	Silver	Bronze
Team Competition
Team All-Around	Russia Arina Averina; Dina Averina; Ekaterina Selezneva	Israel Linoy Ashram; Yuliana Telegina; Nicol Voronkov; Nicol Zelikman	Belarus Katsiaryna Halkina; Alina Harnasko; Anastasiia Salos
Individual Finals
All-Around	Dina Averina (RUS)	Arina Averina (RUS)	Linoy Ashram (ISR)
Hoop	Ekaterina Selezneva (RUS)	Linoy Ashram (ISR)	Dina Averina (RUS)
Ball	Dina Averina (RUS)	Arina Averina (RUS)	Linoy Ashram (ISR)
Clubs	Dina Averina (RUS)	Linoy Ashram (ISR)	Vlada Nikolchenko (UKR)
Ribbon	Dina Averina (RUS)	Linoy Ashram (ISR)	Ekaterina Selezneva (RUS)
Groups Finals
Group All-Around	Russia; Evgeniia Levanova; Anastasiia Maksimova; Anastasia Shishmakova; Anzhelika Stubailo; Maria Tolkacheva	Japan; Rie Matsubara; Sakura Noshitani; Sayuri Sugimoto; Ayuka Suzuki; Nanami Takenaka; Kiko Yokota	Bulgaria; Simona Dyankova; Stefani Kiryakova; Madlen Radukanova; Laura Traets; Erika Zafirova
5 Balls	Japan; Rie Matsubara; Sakura Noshitani; Sayuri Sugimoto; Ayuka Suzuki; Nanami Takenaka; Kiko Yokota*	Bulgaria; Simona Dyankova; Stefani Kiryakova; Madlen Radukanova; Laura Traets; Erika Zafirova	Russia; Evgeniia Levanova; Anastasiia Maksimova; Anastasia Shishmakova; Anzhelika Stubailo; Maria Tolkacheva
3 Hoops + 4 Clubs	Russia; Evgeniia Levanova; Anastasiia Maksimova; Anastasia Shishmakova; Anzhelika Stubailo; Maria Tolkacheva	Japan; Rie Matsubara; Sakura Noshitani*; Sayuri Sugimoto; Ayuka Suzuki; Nanami Takenaka; Kiko Yokota	Italy; Anna Basta; Martina Centofanti; Letizia Cicconcelli*; Agnese Duranti; Alessia Maurelli; Martina Santandrea

* reserve gymnast

=== Medal table ===
Rank	Nation	Gold	Silver	Bronze	Total
1	Russia	8	2	3	13
2	Japan	1	2	0	3
3	Israel	0	4	2	6
4	Bulgaria	0	1	1	2
5	Belarus	0	0	1	1
5	Italy	0	0	1	1
5	Ukraine	0	0	1	1
Totals (7 entries)		9	9	9	27

=== Individual medal table ===
Rank	Nation	Gold	Silver	Bronze	Total
1	(Russia) Dina Averina	4	0	1	5
2	(Russia) Ekaterina Selezneva	1	0	1	2
3	(Israel) Linoy Ashram	0	3	2	5
4	(Russia) Arina Averina	0	2	0	2
5	(Ukraine) Vlada Nikolchenko	0	0	1	1
Totals (5 entries)		5	5	5	15

== Individual ==
=== Team ===
The team event took in account the qualification results.

Rank	Nation	Hoop (rhythmic gymnastics)	Ball (rhythmic gymnastics)	Clubs (rhythmic gymnastics)	Ribbon (rhythmic gymnastics)	Total
1st place, gold medalist(s)	Russia	47.050	46.900	70.850	62.700	186.500
2nd place, silver medalist(s)	Israel	45.150	42.500	65.950	58.550	174.750
3rd place, bronze medalist(s)	Belarus	44.100	40.200	63.700	59.100	168.550
4	Italy	42.850	42.250	61.400	55.000	167.000
5	Ukraine	41.150	41.450	63.100	58.000	166.850
6	Bulgaria	42.000	40.950	62.050	57.100	164.250
7	United States	41.700	41.600	60.200	55.200	163.150
8	Japan	41.050	39.200	58.925	42.050	157.475
9	Georgia	40.050	32.650	58.450	51.550	150.600
10	Uzbekistan	39.000	36.450	56.200	51.800	149.400
11	Spain	38.850	37.850	56.275	43.350	149.075
12	Romania	37.850	35.800	56.400	43.950	148.550
13	Azerbaijan	35.950	37.650	53.650	46.300	147.050
14	China	37.400	37.500	54.200	50.450	147.000
15	Kazakhstan	37.325	36.350	54.000	49.600	146.875
16	South Korea	38.350	36.000	54.700	47.250	146.250
17	France	39.000	35.900	53.550	45.000	145.150
18	Greece	33.925	37.550	53.550	47.100	144.225
19	Finland	37.800	34.650	53.800	46.150	143.250
20	Hungary	36.650	34.950	53.350	46.000	142.450
21	Canada	35.150	37.100	52.100	41.700	140.700
22	Slovenia	33.200	38.050	47.925	47.100	140.225
23	Estonia	36.500	33.200	53.150	47.150	139.850
24	Moldova	36.400	35.050	47.450	40.750	137.300
25	Mexico	35.300	35.050	48.650	43.700	135.450
26	Latvia	35.225	34.850	45.900	42.600	133.775
27	Portugal	31.650	34.100	51.250	42.900	131.650
28	Egypt	33.050	33.150	49.100	39.600	130.200
29	Turkey	31.900	33.750	49.150	38.800	128.700
30	Australia	29.850	33.800	48.500	41.400	128.500
31	Austria	33.350	31.275	45.450	39.000	127.125
32	Malaysia	30.350	34.800	46.200	38.850	126.000
33	Lithuania	31.950	29.250	46.600	40.150	125.800
34	Colombia	31.150	30.600	45.075	42.600	122.525
35	Norway	30.200	27.900	45.700	39.250	119.300
36	Cyprus	31.750	27.800	32.050	24.150	115.750
37	Croatia	25.400	29.050	39.300	34.200	106.550
38	South Africa	28.200	27.950	37.950	29.025	106.200
39	Sweden	24.550	27.100	37.825	32.200	102.025
40	San Marino	25.600	25.900	35.750	33.800	101.400
41	Denmark	22.500	23.700	34.400	24.050	91.500
42	Angola	16.500	16.950	26.750	16.200	69.950

=== Individual Qualification ===
- The top 8 scores in each apparatus qualified to the apparatus finals, and the top 24 in overall qualification scores advanced to the all-around final.
- Only the 3 best results are counted in the total score
- Only the 2 highest-ranking gymnasts from each country can qualify to each of the finals.

Rank	Gymnast	Nation	Hoop (rhythmic gymnastics)	Ball (rhythmic gymnastics)	Clubs (rhythmic gymnastics)	Ribbon (rhythmic gymnastics)	Total
1	Dina Averina	Russia	23.650 (1)	23.700 (1)	24.000 (2)	21.700 (1)	71.350 (Q)
2	Linoy Ashram	Israel	23.550 (2)	21.250 (7)	23.600 (3)	21.150 (2)	68.400 (Q)
3	Arina Averina	Russia		23.200 (2)	24.250 (1)	20.300 (6)	67.750 (Q)
4	Ekaterina Selezneva	Russia	23.400 (3)		22.600 (5)	20.700 (4)	66.700
5	Vlada Nikolchenko	Ukraine	20.450 (16)	21.400 (4)	23.450 (4)	21.150 (2)	66.000 (Q)
6	Nicol Zelikman	Israel	21.600 (7)	21.250 (6)	22.100 (6)	19.350 (10)	64.950 (Q)
7	Alexandra Agiurgiuculese	Italy	21.800 (6)	20.950 (9)	21.950 (7)	17.150 (36)	64.700 (Q)
8	Katsiaryna Halkina	Belarus	22.000 (5)	20.600 (10)	21.900 (8)	18.950 (13)	64.500 (Q)
9	Boryana Kaleyn	Bulgaria	21.600 (8)	21.450 (3)	21.350 (10)	19.050 (12)	64.400 (Q)
10	Evita Griskenas	United States	21.000 (10)	21.200 (8)	20.700 (14)	18.600 (17)	62.900 (Q)
11	Milena Baldassarri	Italy	21.050 (9)	21.300 (5)	20.300 (21)	20.500 (5)	62.850 (Q)
12	Anastasiia Salos	Belarus	22.100 (4)		20.200 (23)	20.100 (7)	62.400 (Q)
13	Laura Zeng	United States	20.700 (14)	20.400 (12)	21.150 (11)	19.400 (9)	62.250 (Q)
14	Kaho Minagawa	Japan	20.950 (11)	20.300 (13)	20.450 (15)	9.300 (140)	61.700 (Q)
15	Ekaterina Vedeneeva	Slovenia	20.400 (17)	20.500 (11)	20.425 (17)	18.400 (21)	61.325 (Q)
16	Alina Harnasko	Belarus		19.600 (18)	21.600 (9)	20.050 (8)	61.250
17	Salome Pazhava	Georgia	20.950 (12)	16.400 (60)	20.950 (13)	18.900 (14)	60.800 (Q)
18	Kseniya Moustafaeva	France	20.850 (13)	19.500 (21)	20.300 (20)	16.700 (43)	60.650 (Q)
19	Denisa Mailat	Romania	20.350 (19)	20.100 (14)	20.150 (24)	18.500 (18)	60.600 (Q)
20	Katrin Taseva	Bulgaria	20.400 (18)	19.500 (22)	20.400 (18)	18.800 (15)	60.300 (Q)
21	Zohra Aghamirova	Azerbaijan	19.000 (32)	19.950 (16)	21.100 (12)	18.700 (16)	60.050 (Q)
22	Khrystyna Pohranychna	Ukraine	20.700 (15)	20.050 (15)	19.200 (37)	18.400 (22)	59.950 (Q)
23	Chisaki Oiwa	Japan	20.100 (21)	18.900 (27)	19.300 (36)	18.300 (23)	58.300 (Q)
24	Polina Berezina	Spain	19.200 (28)	19.550 (19)	19.475 (31)	13.500 (90)	58.225 (Q)
25	Fanni Pigniczki	Hungary	19.950 (23)	18.500 (30)	19.750 (26)	17.500 (30)	58.200 (Q)
26	Ekaterina Fetisova	Uzbekistan	19.900 (24)	18.450 (31)	19.600 (30)	17.250 (32)	57.950 (Q)
27	Kim Chae-woon	South Korea	19.750 (25)	18.100 (38)	20.050 (25)	17.200 (34)	57.900 (R1)
28	Rebecca Gergalo	Finland	19.150 (29)	18.950 (26)	19.600 (29)	16.600 (44)	57.700 (R2)
29	Eleni Kelaiditi	Greece	20.275 (20)	19.200 (23)	17.900 (54)	18.200 (24)	57.675 (R3)
30	Zhao Yating	China	18.850 (34)	19.700 (17)	19.100 (41)	17.900 (26)	57.650
31	Barbara Domingos	Brazil	18.450 (41)	19.100 (25)	19.650 (28)	13.850 (84)	57.200
32	Jelizaveta Polstjanaja	Latvia	20.000 (22)	19.150 (24)	15.250 (103)	17.800 (27)	56.950
33	Katherine Uchida	Canada	18.100 (43)	19.550 (19)	18.300 (47)	15.800 (53)	55.950
34	Sabina Tashkenbaeva	Uzbekistan	19.100 (31)	18.000 (39)	18.800 (43)	17.750 (28)	55.900
35	Alina Adilkhanova	Kazakhstan	18.850 (35)	17.650 (43)	19.150 (40)	17.700 (29)	55.700
36	Adilya Tlekenova	Kazakhstan	18.475 (40)	18.700 (28)	17.850 (58)	18.500 (19)	55.675
37	Nicol Ruprecht	Austria	19.250 (27)	17.350 (49)	18.950 (42)	17.050 (38)	55.550
38	Viktoria Bogdanova	Estonia	18.950 (33)	18.500 (29)	18.000 (52)	15.800 (54)	55.450
39	María Añó	Spain	19.650 (26)	18.300 (36)	17.450 (65)	13.750 (85)	55.400
40	Natela Bolataeva	Georgia	19.100 (30)	16.250 (64)	19.450 (32)	16.800 (41)	55.350
41	Seo Go-eun	South Korea	18.600 (37)	17.900 (40)	18.600 (44)	14.350 (78)	55.100
42	Elizaveta Iampolskaia	Moldova	18.500 (39)	17.650 (44)	18.500 (45)	17.100 (37)	54.650
43	Liu Jiahui	China	18.550 (38)	17.800 (41)	17.850 (57)	16.900 (40)	54.200
44	Natalia Gaudio	Brazil	15.900 (65)	18.100 (37)	19.650 (27)	16.000 (50)	53.750
45	Andreea Verdes	Romania	17.500 (47)	15.700 (70)	19.350 (33)	12.950 (99)	52.550
46	Kamelya Tuncel	Turkey	17.300 (49)	18.350 (35)	16.700 (77)	13.900 (82)	52.350
47	Ioanna Magopoulou	Greece		18.350 (34)	19.300 (35)	14.650 (82)	52.300
48	Brigita Budginas	Lithuania	17.300 (50)		17.900 (53)	17.050 (39)	52.250
49	Jouki Tikkanen	Finland	18.650 (36)	15.700 (71)	17.800 (59)	13.450 (91)	52.150
50	Rut Castillo Galindo	Mexico	17.300 (51)	16.600 (56)	18.250 (49)	13.350 (94)	52.150
51	Natalia Kozioł	Poland	17.350 (48)	16.875 (54)	17.750 (61)	14.800 (65)	51.975
52	Alina Chamzina	Czech Republic	16.850 (58)	17.450 (47)	17.650 (63)	14.500 (75)	51.950
53	Veronika Hudis	Azerbaijan	16.950 (56)	17.700 (42)	16.500 (79)	17.150 (35)	51.800
54	Anna Juhász	Hungary	16.700 (59)	16.450 (58)	18.300 (47)	15.200 (62)	51.450
55	Karla Diaz	Mexico	18.000 (44)	18.450 (32)	13.900 (119)	14.800 (66)	51.250
56	Anastasia Zacrevschi	Moldova	17.900 (45)	17.400 (48)	14.450 (114)	15.750 (55)	51.050
57	Izzah Amzan	Malaysia	16.900 (57)	18.400 (33)	15.650 (97)	11.500 (117)	50.950
58	Habiba Marzouk	Egypt	16.050 (62)	16.950 (52)	17.850 (55)		50.850
59	Rita Araujo	Portugal	16.000 (64)	16.900 (53)	17.850 (56)		50.750
60	Alexandra Kiroi-Bogatyreva	Australia	15.250 (73)	17.250 (50)	17.450 (64)	16.050 (49)	50.750
61	Viktoria Skittidi	Cyprus	17.050 (54)	16.200 (66)	17.450 (66)	15.300 (61)	50.600
62	Natalie Garcia	Canada	17.050 (53)		17.200 (72)	16.350 (45)	50.600
63	Kim Mun-ye	North Korea	17.050 (52)	16.450 (59)	16.800 (76)	16.200 (46)	50.300
64	Margarida Ferreira	Portugal	15.650 (67)	17.200 (51)	17.200 (70)	14.650 (71)	50.050
65	Lidiia Iakovleva	Australia	14.600 (84)	16.550 (57)	17.700 (62)	11.700 (114)	48.850
66	Maëna Millon	France	18.150 (42)		16.000 (91)	14.700 (68)	48.850
67	Xénia Kiliánová	Slovakia	15.250 (72)	15.950 (67)	17.200 (71)	14.650 (72)	48.400
68	Rejchl Stojanov	North Macedonia	15.450 (70)	15.550 (72)	17.250 (69)	14.550 (72)	48.250
69	Mariam Selim	Egypt	17.000 (55)		15.550 (99)	14.900 (64)	47.450
70	Valerie Romenski	France		16.400 (62)	17.250 (68)	13.600 (89)	47.250
71	Ri Un-yong	North Korea	16.200 (61)	16.350 (63)	14.600 (111)	DNS	47.150
72	Lina Dussan	Colombia	16.000 (63)	15.400 (73)	15.650 (97)	12.850 (100)	47.050
73	Alina Baklagina	Latvia	15.225 (74)	15.700 (69)	15.650 (96)	13.150 (97)	46.575
74	Zeynep Özcan	Turkey	14.600 (83)	15.400 (74)	16.300 (84)	12.500 (108)	46.300
75	Sabina Zálešáková	Czech Republic	15.450 (69)	14.100 (84)	16.375 (82)	14.400 (77)	46.225
76	Josephine Juul Møller	Norway	13.900 (88)	15.950 (68)	16.100 (88)		45.950
77	Alissa Sadek	Lebanon	14.950 (76)	14.750 (77)	15.900 (92)	11.200 (120)	45.600
78	Koi Sieyan	Malaysia	13.450 (92)	16.400 (61)	15.500 (100)	12.700 (103)	45.350
79	Anna-Marie Ondaatje	Sri Lanka	15.850 (66)	14.550 (80)	14.650 (110)	13.850 (83)	45.050
80	Vanessa Galindo	Colombia	15.150 (75)		15.375 (101)	14.350 (79)	44.875
81	Oriana Viñas	Colombia		15.200 (75)	14.050 (116)	15.400 (60)	44.650
82	Maria Dervisi	Greece	13.650 (89)		16.350 (83)	14.250 (80)	44.250
83	Julija Ivanova	Lithuania		14.200 (83)	15.700 (95)	13.950 (81)	44.850
84	Andrijana Blažić	Serbia	14.400 (85)	14.350 (82)	15.100 (105)	9.850 (135)	43.850
85	Sophie Crane	Canada		17.550 (45)	16.600 (78)	9.550 (137)	43.700
86	Lilica Burger	South Africa	14.700 (78)	13.600 (88)	15.100 (104)	12.100 (111)	43.400
87	Giuliana Cusnier	Puerto Rico	15.300 (71)	13.850 (87)	13.800 (121)	13.100 (98)	42.950
88	Aleksandra Sklioutovskaya-Lopez	Puerto Rico	15.550 (68)	13.500 (89)	13.850 (120)	10.350 (128)	42.900
89	Kristína Semanová	Slovakia	12.050 (101)	14.650 (79)	16.100 (87)	10.150 (130)	42.800
90	Laura Božić	Croatia	12.750 (97)	16.600 (55)	13.350 (127)	12.800 (102)	42.750
91	Aisha Izabekova	Kyrgyzstan	14.750 (77)	13.050 (96)	14.600 (112)	13.350 (93)	42.700
92	Agata Bykovskaia	Kyrgyzstan	14.700 (79)	12.525 (99)	15.050 (107)	12.850 (101)	42.600
93	Ingrid Bratsberg	Norway	16.300 (60)	11.950 (104)	13.800 (122)	11.800 (113)	42.050
94	Lisa Hofmann	Austria	14.100 (86)	13.925 (86)	13.000 (132)	9.850 (134)	41.025
95	Antonella Genuzio	Bolivia	13.300 (93)	13.450 (91)	14.050 (117)	11.000 (124)	40.800
96	Cassandra Pettersson	Sweden	14.050 (87)	13.100 (94)	13.450 (126)	12.550 (105)	40.600
97	Lucia Castiglioni	San Marino	12.900 (94)	13.500 (90)	13.700 (123)	12.550 (106)	40.100
98	Shannon Gardiner	South Africa	13.500 (91)	14.350 (81)	12.200 (137)	10.475 (126)	40.050
99	Benjaporn Limpanich	Thailand	12.800 (96)	13.300 (92)	12.700 (135)	12.250 (110)	38.800
100	Undram Khashbat	Mongolia	14.700 (81)	9.600 (109)	14.050 (118)	8.850 (93)	38.350
101	Lana Sambol	Croatia	12.650 (99)	12.450 (100)	12.750 (134)	10.250 (129)	37.850
102	Luana Gomes	Angola	11.150 (105)	13.100 (95)	13.500 (125)	9.450 (139)	37.750
103	Saruul Tsogtbayar	Mongolia	13.550 (90)	12.400 (101)	10.150 (147)	11.550 (116)	37.500
104	Alva Svennbeck	Sweden	10.500 (106)	14.000 (85)	12.825 (133)	10.050 (132)	37.325
105	Isabella Schultz	Denmark	12.400 (100)	12.600 (98)	11.800 (139)	10.900 (125)	36.800
106	Monica Garbarino	San Marino	12.700 (98)	12.400 (102)	9.500 (148)	11.100 (122)	36.200
107	Aya Courouble	Belgium	11.400 (104)	12.850 (97)	11.200 (144)	11.050 (123)	35.450
108	Nat Kulsanawong	Thailand	11.450 (103)	12.350 (103)	11.600 (140)	11.250 (119)	35.400
109	Fabiana Abastoflor	Bolivia	8.950 (108)	13.300 (93)	12.050 (138)	9.525 (138)	34.875
110	Marcia Alves Lopes	Cape Verde	11.450 (102)	11.250 (106)	11.500 (142)	6.350 (149)	34.200
111	Josefie Kristensen	Denmark	10.100 (107)		11.400 (143)	7.800 (147)	29.300
112	Jovana Marković	Montenegro	8.800 (109)	10.100 (108)	8.950 (150)	8.350 (144)	27.850
113	Emilie Kristensen	Denmark	14.750 (77)	11.100 (107)	11.200 (145)	5.350 (150)	27.650
114	Carla Varas	Andorra	7.250 (111)	8.300 (110)	9.350 (149)	10.000 (133)	27.650
115	Anja Jovanović	Montenegro	7.850 (110)	5.650 (111)	8.350 (151)	8.100 (145)	24.300
116	Alice Tomas	Angola	5.350 (112)	3.850 (112)	6.750 (152)	2.700 (152)	15.950

=== All-around ===
The top 16 gymnasts earned their NOCs a qualification spot at the all-around individual event of the 2020 Summer Olympics.

Rank	Gymnast	Nation	Hoop (rhythmic gymnastics)	Ball (rhythmic gymnastics)	Clubs (rhythmic gymnastics)	Ribbon (rhythmic gymnastics)	Total
1st place, gold medalist(s)	Dina Averina	Russia	23.800	22.950	23.000	21.650	91.400
2nd place, silver medalist(s)	Arina Averina	Russia	23.100	23.100	24.050	20.850	91.100
3rd place, bronze medalist(s)	Linoy Ashram	Israel	22.050	23.100	23.500	21.050	89.700
4	Boryana Kaleyn	Bulgaria	21.625	22.400	22.350	19.900	86.275
5	Vlada Nikolchenko	Ukraine	22.950	22.250	19.500	19.450	84.150
6	Alexandra Agiurgiuculese	Italy	21.600	21.100	21.850	18.950	83.500
7	Milena Baldassarri	Italy	21.400	21.150	21.550	19.150	83.250
8	Evita Griskenas	United States	21.200	21.100	20.850	19.850	83.000
9	Katrin Taseva	Bulgaria	20.200	20.900	21.800	19.100	82.000
10	Laura Zeng	United States	21.200	20.700	21.300	18.650	81.850
11	Nicol Zelikman	Israel	20.500	19.200	21.750	20.300	81.750
12	Khrystyna Pohranychna	Ukraine	21.200	20.500	20.300	18.575	80.575
13	Kaho Minagawa	Japan	20.300	19.900	21.150	18.950	80.300
14	Anastasiia Salos	Belarus	19.400	21.150	20.550	18.200	79.300
15	Katsiaryna Halkina	Belarus	21.400	20.100	21.300	16.200	79.000
16	Zohra Aghamirova	Azerbaijan	20.900	19.525	21.200	17.100	78.725
17	Ekaterina Vedeneeva	Slovenia	20.100	18.650	20.800	19.100	78.650
18	Salome Pazhava	Georgia	20.000	18.900	19.700	18.750	77.350
19	Chisaki Oiwa	Japan	20.850	19.250	18.400	18.850	77.350
20	Ekaterina Fetisova	Uzbekistan	20.050	19.750	19.650	17.800	77.250
21	Fanni Pigniczki	Hungary	20.250	19.700	20.100	15.450	75.500
22	Polina Berezina	Spain	19.500	19.050	19.500	17.200	75.250
23	Kseniya Moustafaeva	France	20.900	19.500	16.750	17.700	74.850
24	Denisa Mailat	Romania	18.150	18.500	18.700	15.500	70.850

=== Hoop ===
Rank	Gymnast	Nation	D Score	E Score	Pen.	Total
1st place, gold medalist(s)	Ekaterina Selezneva	Russia	14.400	9.100		23.500
2nd place, silver medalist(s)	Linoy Ashram	Israel	14.700	8.700		23.400
3rd place, bronze medalist(s)	Dina Averina	Russia	14.100	9.250		23.350
4	Nicol Zelikman	Israel	12.900	8.550		21.450
5	Boryana Kaleyn	Bulgaria	12.800	8.600		21.400
6	Alexandra Agiurgiuculese	Italy	12.900	8.450		21.350
7	Katsiaryna Halkina	Belarus	12.100	8.900		21.000
8	Anastasiia Salos	Belarus	12.200	7.350	-0.300	19.250

=== Ball ===
Rank	Gymnast	Nation	D Score	E Score	Pen.	Total
1st place, gold medalist(s)	Dina Averina	Russia	14.400	9.100		23.500
2nd place, silver medalist(s)	Arina Averina	Russia	14.000	9.100	-0.050	23.050
3rd place, bronze medalist(s)	Linoy Ashram	Israel	13.900	8.550	-0.050	22.400
4	Milena Baldassarri	Italy	13.600	8.600		22.200
5	Boryana Kaleyn	Bulgaria	13.500	8.600		22.100
6	Vlada Nikolchenko	Ukraine	12.900	8.550		21.450
7	Nicol Zelikman	Israel	13.000	8.450		21.450
8	Evita Griskenas	United States	12.000	8.350		20.350

=== Clubs ===
Rank	Gymnast	Nation	D Score	E Score	Pen.	Total
1st place, gold medalist(s)	Dina Averina	Russia	14.800	9.000		23.800
2nd place, silver medalist(s)	Linoy Ashram	Israel	14.600	8.700		23.300
3rd place, bronze medalist(s)	Vlada Nikolchenko	Ukraine	13.800	8.550		22.350
4	Arina Averina	Russia	13.600	8.450		22.050
5	Alexandra Agiurgiuculese	Italy	13.400	8.500		21.900
6	Alina Harnasko	Belarus	13.100	8.500		21.600
7	Nicol Zelikman	Israel	12.900	7.950		20.850
8	Katsiaryna Halkina	Belarus	12.700	8.100		20.800

=== Ribbon ===
Rank	Gymnast	Nation	D Score	E Score	Pen.	Total
1st place, gold medalist(s)	Dina Averina	Russia	12.700	9.100		21.800
2nd place, silver medalist(s)	Linoy Ashram	Israel	12.800	8.000	-0.050	20.750
3rd place, bronze medalist(s)	Ekaterina Selezneva	Russia	12.000	8.700	-0.050	20.650
4	Vlada Nikolchenko	Ukraine	12.300	8.050		20.350
5	Laura Zeng	United States	11.000	8.300		19.300
6	Alina Harnasko	Belarus	10.800	8.000		18.800
7	Anastasiia Salos	Belarus	10.300	7.500		17.800
8	Milena Baldassarri	Italy	9.600	7.125		16.725

== Groups ==
=== Squads ===
Team	Azerbaijan (AZE)	Belarus (BLR)	Brazil (BRA)	Bulgaria (BUL)	Canada (CAN)	China (CHN)
Members	Diana Ahmadbayli; Ayshan Bayramova; Zeynab Hummatova; Aliya Pashayeva; Darya Sorokina	Hanna Haidukevich; Anastasiya Rybakova; Hanna Shvaiba; Arina Tsitsilina; Karyna Yarmolenka	Vitoria Guerra; Deborah Medrado; Nicole Pircio; Camila Rossi; Beatriz Silva	Simona Dyankova; Stefani Kiryakova; Madlen Radukanova; Laura Traets; Erika Zafirova	Carmel Kallemaa; Diana Noskova; Vanessa Panov; Carmen Whelan; Alexandra Zilyuk	Guo Qiqi (Note: Only competed in 5 Balls); Hao Ting (Note: Only competed in 3 Hoops + 4 Clubs); Hu Yuhui; Huang Zhangjiayang; Liu Xin; Xu Yanshu
Team	Spain (ESP)	Estonia (EST)	Finland (FIN)	France (FRA)	Germany (GER)	Greece (GRE)
Members	Victoria Cuadrillero; Clara Esquerdo; Ana Gayán; Alba Polo; Emma Reyes; Sara Salarrullana	Laurabell Kabrits; Vasilina Kuksova; Arina Okamanchuk; Lera Teino; Alina Vesselova	Elisa Liinavuori; Milja Naerevaara; Inka Ora; Emma Rantala; Juulia Vainio; Amanda Virkkunen	Danae Collard; Helene Deconninck; Eloise Marchon; Iliona Prioux; Astrid Rabette; Elisabeth Rachid	Viktoria Burjak; Daniela Huber; Nathalie Koehn; Noemi Peschel; Anni Qu; Alexandra Tikhonovich	Chrysa Athanasakopoulou; Chrysi Moutafi; Aikaterini Pagoulatou; Christina Ourania Riga; Despoina Tousi; Ioanna Anna Tziatzia
Team	Hungary (HUN)	Israel (ISR)	Italy (ITA)	Japan (JPN)	Kazakhstan (KAZ)	Mexico (MEX)
Members	Patricia Borsanyi; Cintia Vivien Foeldi; Jazmin Kovacs; Virag Nemeth; Monika Urban-Szabo; Vivien Wehovszky	Shai Ben Ruby; Ofir Dayan; Yana Kramarenko; Natalie Raits; Bar Shapochnikov; Karin Vexman	Anna Basta; Martina Centofanti; Letizia Cicconcelli; Agnese Duranti; Alessia Maurelli; Martina Santandrea	Rie Matsubara; Sakura Noshitani; Sayuri Sugimoto; Ayuka Suzuki; Nanami Takenaka; Kiko Yokota	Jessika Budnik; Zhanerke Dauletkulova; Sagina Muratkyzy; Dariya Sharafidenova; Regina Sultanova; Dayana Zhakupova	Ana Galindo; Adriana Hernandez; Mildred Maldonado; Sara Ruiz; Brittany Sainz; Karen Villanueva
Team	Poland (POL)	North Korea (PRK)	Russia (RUS)	Ukraine (UKR)	United States (USA)	Uzbekistan (UZB)
Members	Julia Chochol; Alicja Dobrołęcka; Milena Gorska; Aleksandra Majewska; Aleksandra Wlazlak	Kang Jin-a; Pak Un-gyong; Ri Hye-song; Ryang Yong-mi; Sin Su-rim	Evgeniia Levanova; Anastasiia Maksimova; Anastasia Shishmakova; Anzhelika Stubailo; Maria Tolkacheva	Alina Bykhno; Diana Myzherytska; Anastasiya Voznyak; Mariia Vysochanska; Valeriya Yuzviak	Isabelle Connor; Connie Du; Yelyzaveta Merenzon; Elizaveta Pletneva; Nicole Sladkov; Kristina Sobolevskaya	Kseniia Aleksandrova; Kamola Irnazarova; Safiyabonu Kasimova; Dinara Ravshanbekova; Sevara Safoeva; Nilufar Shomuradova

=== Group All-Around ===
The top 8 scores in each apparatus qualified to the group apparatus finals. The top 5 teams in this list that are not already qualified for the 2020 Summer Olympics (Russia, Bulgaria, and Italy) qualified a team for the group all-around event at the 2020 Olympics.

Place	Nation	5	3 + 2	Total
1st place, gold medalist(s)	Russia	30.000 (1)	28.700 (3)	58.700
2nd place, silver medalist(s)	Japan	29.200 (3)	29.000 (1)	58.200
3rd place, bronze medalist(s)	Bulgaria	29.200 (2)	28.800 (2)	58.000
4	Belarus	28.400 (4)	28.000 (4)	56.400
5	Italy	27.800 (6)	27.400 (6)	55.200
6	Israel	27.450 (7)	27.500 (5)	54.950
7	China	27.150 (8)	26.100 (8)	53.250
8	Azerbaijan	26.400 (9)	26.700 (7)	53.100
9	Ukraine	28.250 (5)	22.900 (20)	51.150
10	USA	25.050 (12)	25.600 (10)	50.650
11	Mexico	24.950 (13)	25.600 (11)	50.550
12	Finland	25.550 (10)	24.975 (14)	50.525
13	Brazil	25.450 (11)	24.250 (16)	49.700
14	Uzbekistan	24.000 (16)	25.400 (13)	49.400
15	Germany	24.750 (14)	24.550 (15)	49.300
16	France	23.400 (18)	25.400 (12)	48.800
17	Spain	23.200 (20)	25.600 (9)	48.800
18	Poland	24.300 (15)	23.350 (17)	47.650
19	Estonia	23.300 (19)	23.250 (18)	46.550
20	Canada	22.400 (21)	23.050 (19)	45.450
21	Hungary	23.850 (17)	20.900 (23)	44.750
22	Greece	22.000 (22)	20.900 (22)	42.900
23	North Korea	19.800 (23)	21.950 (21)	41.750
24	Kazakhstan	19.675 (24)	19.800 (24)	39.475

=== 5 Balls ===
Rank	Nation	E Score	D Score	Pen.	Total
1st place, gold medalist(s)	Japan	8.650	20.900		29.550
2nd place, silver medalist(s)	Bulgaria	8.750	20.700	-0.10	29.350
3rd place, bronze medalist(s)	Russia	8.150	20.000		28.150
4	Israel	7.550	19.400		26.950
5	China	7.600	19.200		26.800
6	Italy	6.800	19.400	-0.30	25.900
7	Belarus	6.600	19.500	-0.30	25.800
8	Ukraine	6.300	18.500		24.800

=== 3 Hoops + 4 Clubs ===
Rank	Nation	E Score	D Score	Pen.	Total
1st place, gold medalist(s)	Russia	8.450	21.000		29.450
2nd place, silver medalist(s)	Japan	8.300	21.100		29.400
3rd place, bronze medalist(s)	Italy	8.600	20.600		29.200
4	Belarus	8.500	20.600		29.100
5	Bulgaria	8.750	20.100		28.850
6	Israel	7.350	19.200	-0.05	26.500
7	Azerbaijan	7.650	18.800		26.450
8	China	8.050	18.200		26.250
