= Uzbekistan at the 2020 Summer Olympics =

- IOC code: UZB
- NOC: National Olympic Committee of the Republic of Uzbekistan
- Website: www.olympic.uz (in Uzbek and English)

in Tokyo, Japan July 23, 2021 – August 8, 2021
- Competitors: 67 in 15 sports
- Flag bearers (opening): Nigora Tursunkulova; Bakhodir Jalolov
- Flag bearer (closing): Akbar Djuraev
- Medals Ranked 32nd: Gold 3 Silver 0 Bronze 2 Total 5

Summer Olympics appearances (overview)
- 1996; 2000; 2004; 2008; 2012; 2016; 2020; 2024

Other related appearances
- Russian Empire (1900–1912); Soviet Union (1952–1988); Unified Team (1992)

Uzbekistan competed at the 2020 Summer Olympics in Tokyo. Originally scheduled to take place from 24 July to 9 August 2020, the Games were postponed to 23 July to 8 August 2021, due to the COVID-19 pandemic. It was the nation's seventh consecutive appearance at the Summer Olympics in the post-Soviet era.

Uzbekistan won five medals at these Games, down from 13 in 2016. However, the country won three gold medals, only one fewer than in Rio.

== Medalists ==
Medal	Name	Sport	Event	Date
Gold	Ulugbek Rashitov	Taekwondo	Men's 68 kg	25 July
Gold	Akbar Djuraev	Weightlifting	Men's 109 kg	3 August
Gold	Bakhodir Jalolov	Boxing	Men's super heavyweight	8 August
Bronze	Davlat Bobonov	Judo	Men's 90 kg	28 July
Bronze	Bekzod Abdurakhmonov	Wrestling	Men's freestyle 74 kg	6 August

== Competitors ==
The following is the list of competitors participating in the Games:

Sport	Men	Women	Total
Athletics	2	5	7
Boxing	8	3	11
Canoeing	0	2	2
Cycling	1	1	2
Fencing	1	2	3
Gymnastics	1	7	8
Judo	7	3	10
Modern pentathlon	1	1	2
Rowing	2	0	2
Shooting	0	1	1
Swimming	1	1	2
Taekwondo	2	2	4
Tennis	1	0	1
Weightlifting	2	2	4
Wrestling	8	0	8
Total	37	30	67

== Athletics ==
Uzbek athletes further achieved the entry standards, either by qualifying time or by world ranking, in the following track and field events (up to a maximum of 3 athletes in each event):

Key

- Note–Ranks given for track events are within the athlete's heat only
- Q = Qualified for the next round
- q = Qualified for the next round as a fastest loser or, in field events, by position without achieving the qualifying target
- NR = National record
- N/A = Round not applicable for the event
- Bye = Athlete not required to compete in round

Field events

Athlete	Event	Qualification		Final	
Athlete	Event	Distance	Position	Distance	Position
Ruslan Kurbanov	Men's triple jump	NM	—	Did not advance	
Suhrob Khodjaev	Men's hammer throw	71.26	29	Did not advance	
Darya Reznichenko	Women's long jump	6.19	26	Did not advance	
Roksana Khudoyarova	Women's triple jump	13.02	29	Did not advance	
Svetlana Radzivil	Women's high jump	1.90	20	Did not advance	
Safina Sadullaeva	Women's high jump	1.95	=4 Q	1.96	=6

Combined events – Women's heptathlon

Athlete	Event	110H	HJ	SP	200 m	LJ	JT	800 m	Final	Rank
Ekaterina Voronina	Result	14.19	1.77	13.76	24.67	6.11	49.88	2:09.73	6298	12
Ekaterina Voronina	Points	952	941	778	917	883	858	969	6298	12

== Boxing ==
Uzbekistan entered eleven boxers (eight men and three women) into the Olympic tournament. 2019 world medalists Mirazizbek Mirzakhalilov (men's featherweight), Bobo-Usmon Baturov (men's welterweight), and reigning super heavyweight champion Bakhodir Jalolov, two-time Asian medalist Elnur Abduraimov, and rookies Sanjar Tursunov (men's heavyweight) and Tursunoy Rakhimova (women's flyweight), with Shakhobidin Zoirov looking to defend his men's flyweight title for his second Games, secured the spots on the Uzbek squad in their respective weight divisions, either by advancing to the semifinal match or by scoring a box-off triumph at the 2020 Asia & Oceania Qualification Tournament in Amman, Jordan.

Fanat Kakhramonov (men's middleweight), 2019 world silver medalist Dilshodbek Ruzmetov (men's light heavyweight), Raykhona Kodirova (women's lightweight), and Maftunakhton Melieva (women's middleweight) completed the nation's boxing lineup by topping the list of eligible boxers from Asia and Oceania in their respective weight divisions of the IOC's Boxing Task Force Rankings. Melieva was later replaced by Shakhnova Yunusova. With 11 successful entrants, Uzbekistan has the largest number of qualified boxers at the Games, shared with Great Britain. Uzbekistan won one gold medal by Bakhodir Jalolov.

Men

Athlete	Event	Round of 32	Round of 16	Quarterfinals	Semifinals	Final	
Athlete	Event	Opposition Result	Opposition Result	Opposition Result	Opposition Result	Opposition Result	Rank
Shakhobidin Zoirov	Flyweight	Çiftçi (TUR); W 5–0	Varela de Pina (CPV); W 5–0	Paalam (PHI); L 0–4	Did not advance		
Mirazizbek Mirzakhalilov	Featherweight	Bye	Walker (IRL); L 1–4	Did not advance			
Elnur Abduraimov	Lightweight	Baatarsükhiin (MGL); W 4–1	Usmonov (TJK); W 5–0	Bachkov (ARM); L 0–5	Did not advance		
Bobo-Usmon Baturov	Welterweight	Bye	Polanco (DOM); W 4–0	McCormack (GBR); L 1–4	Did not advance		
Fanat Kakhramonov	Middleweight	Kharabadze (GEO); W 5–0	Amankul (KAZ); L 0–5	Did not advance			
Dilshodbek Ruzmetov	Light heavyweight	Brennan (IRL); W 5–0	Alfonso (AZE); L 1–4	Did not advance			
Sanjar Tursunov	Heavyweight	Benchabla (ALG); L 1–4	Did not advance				
Bakhodir Jalolov	Super heavyweight	Bye	Abdullayev (AZE); W 5–0	Kumar (IND); W 5–0	Clarke (GBR); W 5–0	Torrez (USA); W 5–0	1st place, gold medalist(s)

Women

Athlete	Event	Round of 32	Round of 16	Quarterfinals	Semifinals	Final	
Athlete	Event	Opposition Result	Opposition Result	Opposition Result	Opposition Result	Opposition Result	Rank
Tursunoy Rakhimova	Flyweight	Drabik (POL); W 4–1	Çakıroğlu (TUR); L 2–3	Did not advance			
Raykhona Kodirova	Lightweight	bye	Yumba (COD); W 5–0	Ferreira (BRA); L 0–5	Did not advance		
Shakhnova Yunusova	Welterweight	Koszewska (POL); L 0–5	Did not advance				

== Canoeing ==
=== Sprint ===
Uzbekistan qualified a single boat in the women's C-2 500 m for the Games by finishing fifth in the final race at the 2019 ICF Canoe Sprint World Championships in Szeged, Hungary.

Athlete	Event	Heats		Quarterfinals		Semifinals		Final	
Athlete	Event	Time	Rank	Time	Rank	Time	Rank	Time	Rank
Dilnoza Rakhmatova	Women's C-1 200 m	47.716	5 QF	46.645	3	Did not advance			
Nilufar Zokirova	Women's C-1 200 m	49.686	6 QF	48.995	6	Did not advance			
Dilnoza Rakhmatova; Nilufar Zokirova	Women's C-2 500 m	2:04.854	4 QF	2:04.450	2 SF	2:09.614	5 FB	2:04.658	11

Qualification Legend: FA = Qualify to final (medal); FB = Qualify to final B (non-medal)

== Cycling ==
=== Road ===
Uzbekistan entered one rider to compete in the men's Olympic road race by their finish in the top two not yet qualified at the 2019 Asian Championships in Tashkent. An additional spot was awarded to the Uzbekistani cyclist in the women's road race by virtue of her top 100 individual finish in the UCI World Ranking.

Athlete	Event	Time	Rank
Muradjan Khalmuratov	Men's road race	6:21:46	64
Olga Zabelinskaya	Women's road race	3:54:31	9

== Fencing ==
Uzbekistan entered three fencers into the Olympic competition for the first time since 2012. Malika Khakimova claimed a spot in the women's épée as one of the two highest-ranked fencers vying for qualification from Asia and Oceania in the FIE Adjusted Official Rankings. Sherzod Mamutov (men's sabre) and Zaynab Dayibekova (women's sabre) rounded out the Uzbek roster as the sole winners of their respective individual events at the Asia and Oceania Zonal Qualifier in Tashkent.

Athlete	Event	Round of 64	Round of 32	Round of 16	Quarterfinal	Semifinal	Final / BM	
Athlete	Event	Opposition Score	Opposition Score	Opposition Score	Opposition Score	Opposition Score	Opposition Score	Rank
Sherzod Mamutov	Men's sabre	Teodosiu (ROU); L 11–15	Did not advance					
Malika Khakimova	Women's épée	Bye	Sun Yw (CHN); L 10–15	Did not advance				
Zaynab Dayibekova	Women's sabre	Aoki (JPN); W 15–9	Shao Yq (CHN); W 15–10	Yoon J-s (KOR); W 15–12	Marton (HUN); L 11–15	Did not advance		

== Gymnastics ==
=== Artistic ===
Uzbekistan entered two artistic gymnasts into the Olympic competition. Rasuljon Abdurakhimov and seven-time Olympian Oksana Chusovitina received a spare berth each in the men's and women's apparatus events, as one of the highest-ranked gymnasts, who were neither part of the team, nor qualified directly through the all-around, at the 2019 World Championships in Stuttgart, Germany.

Men

Athlete	Event	Qualification								Final							
Athlete	Event	Apparatus						Total	Rank	Apparatus						Total	Rank
Athlete	Event	F	PH	R	V	PB	HB	Total	Rank	F	PH	R	V	PB	HB	Total	Rank
Rasuljon Abdurakhimov	All-around	12.566	12.166	12.733	13.833	14.733	13.033	79.064	49	Did not advance							

Women

Athlete	Event	Qualification						Final					
Athlete	Event	Apparatus				Total	Rank	Apparatus				Total	Rank
Athlete	Event	V	UB	BB	F	Total	Rank	V	UB	BB	F	Total	Rank
Oksana Chusovitina	Vault	14.166	—N/a			14.166	14	Did not advance					

=== Rhythmic ===
Uzbekistan fielded a squad of rhythmic gymnasts. Sabina Tashkenbaeva secured an individual spot to the Olympics during the 2021 World Cup series by being the second highest-ranked eligible gymnast. Uzbekistan qualified a group spot at the 2021 Asian Rhythmic Gymnastics Championships.

Athlete	Event	Qualification						Final					
Athlete	Event	Hoop	Ball	Clubs	Ribbon	Total	Rank	Hoop	Ball	Clubs	Ribbon	Total	Rank
Ekaterina Fetisova	Individual	19.800	19.400	17.950	18.350	75.500	24	Did not advance					

Athletes	Event	Qualification				Final			
Athletes	Event	5 apps	3+2 apps	Total	Rank	5 apps.	3+2 apps	Total	Rank
Kseniia Aleksandrova; Kamola Irnazarova; Dinara Ravshanbekova; Sevara Safoeva; Nilufar Shomuradova	Group	42.100	36.900	79.000	9	Did not advance			

== Judo ==
Uzbekistan entered 10 judoka into the Olympic tournament based on the International Judo Federation Olympics Individual Ranking.

Men

Athlete	Event	Round of 64	Round of 32	Round of 16	Quarterfinals	Semifinals	Repechage	Final / BM	
Athlete	Event	Opposition Result	Opposition Result	Opposition Result	Opposition Result	Opposition Result	Opposition Result	Opposition Result	Rank
Sharafuddin Lutfillaev	−60 kg	—N/a	Bye	Lesiuk (UKR); L 00–01	Did not advance				
Sardor Nurillaev	−66 kg	—N/a	Vieru (MDA); L 00–10	Did not advance					
Khikmatillokh Turaev	−73 kg	Bye	Wandtke (GER); W 10–00	An C-r (KOR); L 00–01	Did not advance				
Sharofiddin Boltaboev	−81 kg	Bye	Cumbo (VAN); W 10–00	Ivanov (BUL); W 01–00	Borchashvili (AUT); L 00–01	Bye	Grigalashvili (GEO); L 00–01	Did not advance	7
Davlat Bobonov	−90 kg	Bye	Mungai (ITA); W 01–00	Nhabali (UKR); W 01–00	Bekauri (GEO); L 00–10	Bye	Sherazadishvili (ESP); W 01–00	Žgank (TUR); W 10–00	3rd place, bronze medalist(s)
Mukhammadkarim Khurramov	−100 kg	—N/a	Fletcher (IRL); W 01–00	Wolf (JPN); L 00–10	Did not advance				
Bekmurod Oltiboev	+100 kg	—N/a	Duurenbayar (MGL); W 10–00	Grol (NED); W 10–00	Krpálek (CZE); L 00–01	Did not advance	Khammo (UKR); L 00–01	Did not advance	7

Women

Athlete	Event	Round of 32	Round of 16	Quarterfinals	Semifinals	Repechage	Final / BM	
Athlete	Event	Opposition Result	Opposition Result	Opposition Result	Opposition Result	Opposition Result	Opposition Result	Rank
Diyora Keldiyorova	−52 kg	Lkhagvasüren (MGL); L 00–10	Did not advance					
Farangiz Khojieva	−63 kg	Billiet (CPV); L 00–10	Did not advance					
Gulnoza Matniyazova	−70 kg	Memneloum (CHA); W 10–00	van Dijke (NED); L 00–10	Did not advance				

Mixed

Athlete	Event	Round of 16	Quarterfinals	Semifinals	Repechage	Final / BM	
Athlete	Event	Opposition Result	Opposition Result	Opposition Result	Opposition Result	Opposition Result	Rank
Davlat Bobonov; Khikmatillokh Turaev; Bekmurod Oltiboev; Diyora Keldiyorova; Farangiz Khojieva; Gulnoza Matniyazova	Team	Netherlands; L 3–4	Did not advance				

== Modern pentathlon ==
Uzbek athletes qualified for the following spots to compete in modern pentathlon for the first time in history. Alexander Savkin and Alise Fakhrutdinova confirmed places each in the men's and women's event, respectively, with the former finishing fifth and the latter third among those eligible for Olympic qualification at the 2019 Asia & Oceania Championships in Kunming, China.

Athlete	Event	Fencing (épée one touch)				Swimming (200 m freestyle)			Riding (show jumping)			Combined: shooting/running (10 m air pistol)/(3200 m)			Total points	Final rank
Athlete	Event	RR	BR	Rank	MP points	Time	Rank	MP points	Penalties	Rank	MP points	Time	Rank	MP points	Total points	Final rank
Alexander Savkin	Men's	7–28	0	36	142	2:06.64	29	207	21	22	279	11:55.96	32	285	1303	32
Alise Fakhrutdinova	Women's	16–19	0	23	196	2:16.45	22	278	74	29	226	13:55.66	35	465	1165	30

== Rowing ==
Uzbekistan qualified one boat in the men's lightweight double sculls for the Games by winning the bronze medal and securing the second of three berths available at the 2021 FISA Asia & Oceania Olympic Qualification Regatta in Tokyo, Japan.

Athlete	Event	Heats		Repechage		Semifinals		Final	
Athlete	Event	Time	Rank	Time	Rank	Time	Rank	Time	Rank
Shakhboz Kholmurzaev; Sobirjon Safaroliyev	Men's lightweight double sculls	6:44.98	4 R	6:56.22	4 FC	Bye		6:40.25	16

Qualification Legend: FA=Final A (medal); FB=Final B (non-medal); FC=Final C (non-medal); FD=Final D (non-medal); FE=Final E (non-medal); FF=Final F (non-medal); SA/B=Semifinals A/B; SC/D=Semifinals C/D; SE/F=Semifinals E/F; QF=Quarterfinals; R=Repechage

== Shooting ==
Uzbekistan entered one shooter at the games, after getting the allocation quotas.

Athlete	Event	Qualification		Final	
Athlete	Event	Points	Rank	Points	Rank
Mukhtasar Tokhirova	Women's 10 m air rifle	622.2	33	Did not advance	
Mukhtasar Tokhirova	Women's 50 m rifle 3 positions	1155	30	Did not advance	

== Swimming ==
Uzbek swimmers further achieved qualifying standards in the following events (up to a maximum of 2 swimmers in each event at the Olympic Qualifying Time (OQT), and potentially 1 at the Olympic Selection Time (OST)):

However, FINA accused and condemned Uzbekistan federation of cheating on their times.

Athlete	Event	Heat		Semifinal		Final	
Athlete	Event	Time	Rank	Time	Rank	Time	Rank
Khurshidjon Tursunov	Men's 100 m freestyle	50.14	41	Did not advance			
Natalya Kritinina	Women's 50 m freestyle	26.93	48	Did not advance			

== Taekwondo ==
Uzbekistan entered four athletes into the Taekwondo competition at the Games. Rio 2016 Olympian Nikita Rafalovich qualified directly for the second time in the men's welterweight category (80 kg) by finishing among the top five Taekwondo practitioners at the end of the WT Olympic Rankings. Ulugbek Rashitov (men's 68 kg), Rafalovich's fellow Olympian Nigora Tursunkulova (women's 67 kg), and 2018 Asian Games bronze medalist Svetlana Osipova (women's +67 kg) secured the spots on the Uzbek Taekwondo squad with a top two finish each in their respective weight classes at the 2021 Asian Qualification Tournament in Amman, Jordan.

Athlete	Event	Qualification	Round of 16	Quarterfinals	Semifinals	Repechage 1	Repechage 2	Final / BM	
Athlete	Event	Opposition Result	Opposition Result	Opposition Result	Opposition Result	Opposition Result	Opposition Result	Opposition Result	Rank
Ulugbek Rashitov	Men's −68 kg	Fofana (MLI); W 38–17 PTG	Lee D-h (KOR); W 21–19	Hosseini (IRI); W 34–22	Husić (BIH); W 28–5 PTG	Bye		Sinden (GBR); W 34–29	1st place, gold medalist(s)
Nikita Rafalovich	Men's −80 kg	—N/a	Hernández (DOM); W 17–7	Beigi (AZE); W 12–1	El-Sharabaty (JOR); L 11–13	—N/a	Kanaet (CRO); L 18–24	Did not advance	
Nigora Tursunkulova	Women's −67 kg	Bye	Zhang My (CHN); L 9–12	Did not advance					
Svetlana Osipova	Women's +67 kg	—N/a	Deniz (KAZ); L 9–10	Did not advance					

== Tennis ==
Uzbekistan entered one tennis player into the Olympic tournament. Two-time Olympian Denis Istomin secured the outright berth by winning the men's singles title at the 2018 Asian Games in Jakarta.

Athlete	Event	Round of 64	Round of 32	Round of 16	Quarterfinals	Semifinals	Final / BM	
Athlete	Event	Opposition Result	Opposition Result	Opposition Result	Opposition Result	Opposition Result	Opposition Result	Rank
Denis Istomin	Men's singles	Nagal (IND); L 4–6, 7–6^{(8–6)}, 4–6	Did not advance					

== Weightlifting ==
Uzbek weightlifters qualified for four quota places at the games, based on the Tokyo 2020 Rankings Qualification List of 11 June 2021.

Athlete	Event	Snatch		Clean & jerk		Total	Rank
Athlete	Event	Result	Rank	Result	Rank	Total	Rank
Adkhamjon Ergashev	Men's –67 kg	139	7	173	6	312	6
Akbar Djuraev	Men's –109 kg	193	2	237	1	430	1st place, gold medalist(s)
Muattar Nabieva	Women's –55 kg	98 OR	1	114	6	212	4
Kumushkhon Fayzullaeva	Women's –76 kg	101	8	126	6	227	6

== Wrestling ==
Uzbekistan qualified eight wrestlers for each of the following classes in the Olympic competition. Three of them finished among the top six to book Olympic spots in the men's Greco-Roman (60, 77, and 87 kg) at the 2019 World Championships, while five additional licenses were awarded to the Uzbek wrestlers who progressed to the top two finals of their respective weight categories at the 2021 Asian Qualification Tournament in Almaty, Kazakhstan.

Key:

- VT (ranking points: 5–0 or 0–5) – Victory by fall.
- VB (ranking points: 5–0 or 0–5) – Victory by injury (VF for forfeit, VA for withdrawal or disqualification)
- PP (ranking points: 3–1 or 1–3) – Decision by points – the loser with technical points.
- PO (ranking points: 3–0 or 0–3) – Decision by points – the loser without technical points.
- ST (ranking points: 4–0 or 0–4) – Great superiority – the loser without technical points and a margin of victory of at least 8 (Greco-Roman) or 10 (freestyle) points.
- SP (ranking points: 4–1 or 1–4) – Technical superiority – the loser with technical points and a margin of victory of at least 8 (Greco-Roman) or 10 (freestyle) points.

Freestyle

Athlete	Event	Round of 16	Quarterfinal	Semifinal	Repechage	Final / BM	
Athlete	Event	Opposition Result	Opposition Result	Opposition Result	Opposition Result	Opposition Result	Rank
Gulomjon Abdullaev	Men's −57 kg	Liu Mh (CHN); W 3–1 ^{PP}	Uguev (ROC); L 1–3 ^{PP}	Did not advance	Gilman (USA); L 1–4 ^{SP}	Did not advance	7
Bekzod Abdurakhmonov	Men's −74 kg	Gómez (PUR); W 4–0 ^{ST}	Sidakov (ROC); L 1–3 ^{PP}	Did not advance	Midana (GBS); W 4–0 ^{ST}	Kaisanov (KAZ); W 4–1 ^{SP}	3rd place, bronze medalist(s)
Javrail Shapiev	Men's −86 kg	Yazdani (IRI); L 1–3 ^{PP}	Did not advance		Reichmuth (SUI); W 3–1 ^{PP}	Naifonov (ROC); L 0–3 ^{PO}	5
Magomed Ibragimov	Men's −97 kg	Karadeniz (TUR); L 1–3 ^{PP}	Did not advance				11

Greco-Roman

Athlete	Event	Round of 16	Quarterfinal	Semifinal	Repechage	Final / BM	
Athlete	Event	Opposition Result	Opposition Result	Opposition Result	Opposition Result	Opposition Result	Rank
Elmurat Tasmuradov	Men's −60 kg	Temirov (UKR); L 0–3 ^{PO}	Did not advance				14
Jalgasbay Berdimuratov	Men's −77 kg	Chalyan (ARM); L 0–3 ^{PO}	Did not advance				14
Rustam Assakalov	Men's −87 kg	Gobadze (GEO); W 3–1 ^{PP}	Huklek (CRO); L 1–3 ^{PP}	Did not advance			8
Muminjon Abdullaev	Men's −130 kg	Vititin (EST); W 3–0 ^{PO}	Acosta (CHI); L 0–3 ^{PO}	Did not advance			7

== See also ==
- Uzbekistan at the 2020 Summer Paralympics
