= 2021 Asian Rhythmic Gymnastics Championships =

International rhythmic gymnastics competition

The 12th Rhythmic Gymnastics Asian Championships was held in Tashkent, Uzbekistan, from June 8 to 10, 2021. It served as a qualification for the Tokyo Olympics. The winners of the all-around competitions, individual Alina Adilkhanova and the group from Uzbekistan, each won a quota.

== Medalists ==
Event	Gold	Silver	Bronze
All-around
Individual	Alina Adilkhanova (KAZ)	Takhmina Ikromova (UZB)	Ekaterina Fetisova (UZB)
Group	Uzbekistan; Nilufar Shomuradova; Kseniia Aleksandrova; Dinara Ravshanbekova; Sevara Safoeva; Kamola Irnazarova	South Korea; Kim Min-ju; Jang Seo-hee; Ahn Yeo-jin; Kim Min; Park Yeon-kyung; Jeong Ga-yeon	Thailand; Chutikan Piwpong; Puntita Thongsong; Pornnutcha Jedthumrong; Chonthichakon Changomon; Navita Wiboontheerawut; Supidchaya Pinfun
Individual
Hoop	Takhmina Ikromova (UZB)	Alina Adilkhanova (KAZ)	Zhao Yating (CHN)
Ball	Ekaterina Fetisova (UZB)	Alina Adilkhanova (KAZ)	Kim Chae-woon (KOR)
Clubs	Alina Adilkhanova (KAZ)	Takhmina Ikromova (UZB)	Zhao Yating (CHN)
Ribbon	Zhao Yating (CHN)	Takhmina Ikromova (UZB)	Alina Adilkhanova (KAZ)
Group
5 balls	Uzbekistan; Nilufar Shomuradova; Kseniia Aleksandrova; Dinara Ravshanbekova; Sevara Safoeva; Kamola Irnazarova	South Korea; Kim Min-ju; Jang Seo-hee; Ahn Yeo-jin; Kim Min; Park Yeon-kyung; Jeong Ga-yeon	Thailand; Chutikan Piwpong; Puntita Thongsong; Pornnutcha Jedthumrong; Chonthichakon Changomon; Navita Wiboontheerawut; Supidchaya Pinfun
4 clubs + 3 hoops	Uzbekistan; Nilufar Shomuradova; Kseniia Aleksandrova; Dinara Ravshanbekova; Sevara Safoeva; Kamola Irnazarova	South Korea; Kim Min-ju; Jang Seo-hee; Ahn Yeo-jin; Kim Min; Park Yeon-kyung; Jeong Ga-yeon	Thailand; Chutikan Piwpong; Puntita Thongsong; Pornnutcha Jedthumrong; Chonthichakon Changomon; Navita Wiboontheerawut; Supidchaya Pinfun

== Medal table ==
Rank	Nation	Gold	Silver	Bronze	Total
1	Uzbekistan (UZB)	5	3	1	9
2	Kazakhstan (KAZ)	2	2	1	5
3	China (CHN)	1	0	2	3
4	South Korea (KOR)	0	3	1	4
5	Thailand (THA)	0	0	3	3
Totals (5 entries)		8	8	8	24
