= Alexandra Aristoteli =

Australian rhythmic gymnast

- Nickname: Lexy
- Born: 24 May 1997 (age 29) Bankstown, New South Wales
- Height: 1.70 m (5 ft 7 in)

Gymnastics career
- Discipline: Rhythmic gymnastics
- Country represented: Australia
- Club: Premier Gymnastics Academy
- Head coach: Gina Peluso

Alexandra Aristoteli (born 24 May 1997) is an Australian group rhythmic gymnast who represented Australia at the 2020 Summer Olympics.

== Career ==
Aristoteli began ballet when she was four years old because her mother, Maria Aristoteli, is the director of Queensland Dance and Performing Arts. She began training full-time in ballet when she was fifteen years old and spent months training in the United States at the Houston Ballet Academy and the Miami City Ballet School.

Aristoteli began competing with Australia's senior rhythmic gymnastics group in 2018. At the 2018 World Championships, the group finished twenty-ninth in the all-around.

Aristoteli won a gold medal at the 2021 Oceanic Championships with the Australian senior group and qualified a quota for the 2020 Olympic Games. She was selected to represent Australia at the 2020 Summer Olympics alongside Emily Abbot, Alannah Mathews, Himeka Onoda, and Felicity White. They were the first rhythmic gymnastics group to represent Australia at the Olympics. They finished fourteenth in the qualification round for the group all-around.
