= Sakura Noshitani =

Japanese rhythmic gymnast

- Born: 29 September 1997 (age 28) Tokyo, Japan
- Height: 1.68 m (5 ft 6 in)

Gymnastics career
- Discipline: Rhythmic gymnastics
- Country represented: Japan
- Club: Konami Sports Club
- Head coach: Hiroko Yamasaki
- Retired: 2021
Medal record
Women's rhythmic gymnastics
Representing Japan
World Championships
Gold medal – first place	2019 Baku	5 Balls
Silver medal – second place	2018 Sofia	5 Hoops
Silver medal – second place	2019 Baku	Group All-around
Silver medal – second place	2019 Baku	3 Hoops + 4 Clubs
Bronze medal – third place	2015 Suttgart	5 Ribbons
Asian Championships
Gold medal – first place	2016 Tashkent	Group All-around
Gold medal – first place	2016 Tashkent	6 Clubs + 2 Hoops
Gold medal – first place	2019 Pattaya	Group All-around
Gold medal – first place	2016 Tashkent	5 Ribbons
Gold medal – first place	2013 Tashkent	10 Clubs
Silver medal – second place	2013 Tashkent	Group All-around
Silver medal – second place	2013 Tashkent	3 Balls + 2 Ribbons
Silver medal – second place	2019 Pattaya	5 Balls
Bronze medal – third place	2019 Pattaya	3 Hoops + 4 Clubs

Sakura Noshitani (熨斗谷さくら, Noshitani Sakura; born 29 September 1997) is a Japanese former group rhythmic gymnast. She won three medals at the 2019 World Championships, including gold in the 5 balls final. She is a 2016 and 2019 Asian group all-around champion. She represented Japan at the 2016 and 2020 Summer Olympics.

== Career ==
Noshitani began rhythmic gymnastics when she was four years old.

Noshitani won a silver medal in the group all-around, behind China, at the 2013 Asian Championships. The group then won the gold medal in the 10 clubs final and the silver medal in the 3 balls and 2 ribbons final. At the 2013 World Championships, she finished eighth in the group all-around, eighth in 10 clubs, and seventh in 3 balls and 2 ribbons. At the 2014 World Championships, Noshitani and the Japanese group once again finished eighth in the all-around. She helped Japan win the bronze medal in the 5 ribbons final at the 2015 World Championships, which was Japan's first Rhythmic Gymnastics World Championships medal in 40 years.

Noshitani was selected to represent Japan at the 2016 Summer Olympics alongside Airi Hatakeyama, Rie Matsubara, Sayuri Sugimoto, and Kiko Yokota. They qualified for the group all-around final and finished in eighth place. This was the best-ever Olympic result for the Japanese rhythmic gymnastics group.

Noshitani was injured at the 2018 Guadalajara World Challenge Cup and withdrew. She returned in time for the Minsk World Challenge Cup and helped Japan win the group all-around bronze medal. They then won the gold medal in the 3 balls and 2 ropes final. Then at the Kazan World Challenge Cup, they won the bronze medal in the 3 balls and 2 ropes final. At the 2018 World Championships, they won the silver medal in the 5 balls final behind Bulgaria.

Noshitani helped Japan win the group all-around title ahead of the reigning World champions at the 2019 Baku World Cup. They also won a silver medal in the 5 balls final. At the 2019 World Championships, she won a group all-around silver medal, which matched Japan's best-ever group all-around result from 1975. They then won the gold medal in the 5 balls final, becoming the first Japanese group to win a title at the Rhythmic Gymnastics World Championships. They also won the silver medal in the 3 hoops and 4 clubs final.

Noshitani represented Japan at the 2020 Summer Olympics alongside Rie Matsubara, Sayuri Sugimoto, Ayuka Suzuki, and Nanami Takenaka. They advanced into the group all-around final and finished eighth after major mistakes in their 3 hoops and 4 clubs routine. She announced her retirement from the sport in September 2021.
