= Emily Abbot =

Australian rhythmic gymnast

- Born: 28 February 1997 (age 29) Adelaide, South Australia, Australia
- Height: 1.60 m (5 ft 3 in)

Gymnastics career
- Discipline: Rhythmic gymnastics
- Country represented: Australia
- Club: Premier Gymnastics Academy
- Head coach: Gina Peluso

Emily Abbot (born 28 February 1997) is an Australian group rhythmic gymnast who represented Australia at the 2020 Summer Olympics.

== Personal life ==
Emily Abbot was born on 28 February 1997 in Adelaide. She began rhythmic gymnastics when she was ten years old. She graduated from the University of Adelaide in 2018 and is currently studying business at TAFE Queensland. She now lives in Brisbane and works as a disability support carer in addition to her gymnastics training.

== Career ==
Abbot missed the 2016 season due to hip injuries. She first had a hip arthroscopy to repair a detached ligament, but then doctors discovered a bone tumor in her hip and she had another surgery to remove it. She returned to competition at the end of 2017.

In October 2018, Abbot moved to Brisbane to train with Australia's senior rhythmic gymnastics group. At the 2018 World Championships, she finished twenty-ninth with her group. She represented Australia at the 2019 Summer Universiade. She finished seventh in the group all-around, seventh in the 5 balls final, and fifth in the 3 hoops + 4 clubs final.

She won a gold medal at the 2021 Oceanic Championships with the Australian senior group and qualified a quota for the 2020 Olympic Games. She was selected to represent Australia at the 2020 Summer Olympics alongside Alexandra Aristoteli, Alannah Mathews, Himeka Onoda, and Felicity White. They were the first rhythmic gymnastics group to represent Australia at the Olympics. They finished fourteenth in the qualification round for the group all-around.
