= Kseniia Aleksandrova =

Uzbekistani rhythmic gymnast (born 2000)

- Full name: Kseniia Nikolaevna Aleksandrova
- Born: 8 September 2000 (age 25) Samarkand, Uzbekistan
- Height: 1.71 m (5 ft 7 in)

Gymnastics career
- Discipline: Rhythmic gymnastics
- Country represented: Uzbekistan
- Head coach: Yekaterina Pirozhkova
Medal record
Rhythmic gymnastics
Representing Uzbekistan
Asian Championships
| Gold medal – first place | 2019 Pattaya | 5 balls |
| Gold medal – first place | 2019 Pattaya | 4 clubs + 3 hoops |
| Gold medal – first place | 2021 Tashkent | Group all-around |
| Gold medal – first place | 2021 Tashkent | 5 balls |
| Gold medal – first place | 2021 Tashkent | 4 clubs + 3 hoops |
| Silver medal – second place | 2017 Astana | 5 hoops |
| Silver medal – second place | 2019 Pattaya | Group all-around |

Kseniia Nikolaevna Aleksandrova (born 8 September 2000) is an Uzbekistani group rhythmic gymnast who represented Uzbekistan at the 2020 Summer Olympics. She won two gold medals at the 2019 Asian Championships and three gold medals at the 2021 Asian Championships.

== Career ==
Aleksandrova began artistic gymnastics when she was six years old but switched to rhythmic gymnastics a year later. She joined Uzbekistan's national group in 2016.

At the 2017 Asian Championships, Aleksandrova helped Uzbekistan win the silver medal in the 5 balls final, behind Japan, and they finished fourth in the all-around. She then competed at the 2017 World Championships, and the group finished 10th in the all-around. They did not advance into either apparatus final. Then at the 2018 World Championships, the group finished 17th in the all-around.

Aleksandrova won a silver medal in the group all-around at the 2019 Tashkent World Cup. They then won another all-around silver medal at the 2019 Asian Championships, but they won gold medals in both apparatus finals. She competed at the 2019 World Championships, where the Uzbek group finished 14th in the all-around.

At the 2020 Moscow Grand Prix, Aleksandrova and the group won bronze medals in both apparatus finals and placed fourth in the all-around. They then won the group all-around at the 2020 Tartu Grand Prix and won silver medals in both apparatus finals. At the 2021 Moscow Grand Prix, she helped Uzbekistan win the group all-around bronze medal. They then won the all-around gold medal at the 2021 Tashkent World Cup.

Aleksandrova was part of the Uzbekistani group that won the all-around at the 2021 Asian Championships, and they also won gold medals in both the 5 balls and 4 clubs + 3 hoops finals. As a result, Uzbekistan earned the continental berth for the 2020 Summer Olympics. She represented Uzbekistan at the 2020 Summer Olympics alongside Kamola Irnazarova, Dinara Ravshanbekova, Sevara Safoeva, and Nilufar Shomuradova. They finished ninth in the qualification round for the group all-around and were the first reserve for the final.
