= Kamola Irnazarova =

Uzbekistani group rhythmic gymnast (born 2002)

- Full name: Kamola Oybekovna Irnazarova
- Born: 25 April 2002 (age 24) Tashkent, Uzbekistan
- Height: 1.71 m (5 ft 7 in)

Gymnastics career
- Discipline: Rhythmic gymnastics
- Country represented: Uzbekistan
- Head coach: Yekaterina Pirozhkova
Medal record
Rhythmic gymnastics
Representing Uzbekistan
Asian Championships
Gold medal – first place	2019 Pattaya	5 balls
Gold medal – first place	2019 Pattaya	4 clubs + 3 hoops
Gold medal – first place	2021 Tashkent	Group all-around
Gold medal – first place	2021 Tashkent	5 balls
Gold medal – first place	2021 Tashkent	4 clubs + 3 hoops
Silver medal – second place	2019 Pattaya	Group all-around

Kamola Oybekovna Irnazarova (born 25 April 2002) is an Uzbekistani group rhythmic gymnast who represented Uzbekistan at the 2020 Summer Olympics. She won five gold medals at the Asian Championships and competed at two World Championships.

== Early life ==
Irnazarova was born on 25 April 2002, in Tashkent. She has a younger sister named Madina who is also a rhythmic gymnast who competed at the 2019 Junior World Championships. She began rhythmic gymnastics when she was three years old.

== Gymnastics career ==
Irnazarova joined Uzbekistan's national group in 2017. She competed at her first World Championships in 2018 where the Uzbek group finished 17th in the all-around.

Irnazarova helped Uzbekistan win a silver medal in the group all-around at the 2019 Tashkent World Cup. They did not win medals in either apparatus final. They then won another all-around silver medal at the 2019 Asian Championships and won gold medals in both apparatus finals. At the 2019 World Championships, Irnazarova and the Uzbek group finished 14th in the all-around.

Irnazarova competed at the 2020 Moscow Grand Prix where the group won bronze medals in both apparatus finals and placed fourth in the all-around. They then won the group all-around at the 2020 Tartu Grand Prix and won silver medals in both apparatus finals. At the 2021 Moscow Grand Prix, she helped Uzbekistan win the group all-around bronze medal, and they also won a bronze medal in the 5 balls final. The group then won the all-around title at the 2021 Tashkent World Cup. They won another gold medal in the 5 balls finals and won a silver medal in the 3 hoops and 4 clubs final.

Irnazarova was part of the Uzbekistani group that won the all-around at the 2021 Asian Championships, and they also won gold medals in both the 5 balls and 4 clubs + 3 hoops finals. As a result, Uzbekistan earned the continental berth for the 2020 Summer Olympics. Then at the Minsk World Challenge Cup, they won the bronze medal in the all-around behind Israel and Bulgaria. At the 2021 Moscow World Challenge Cup, the group won the all-around bronze medal and silver medals in both apparatus finals.

At the 2020 Summer Olympics, Irnazarova competed alongside Kseniia Aleksandrova, Dinara Ravshanbekova, Sevara Safoeva, and Nilufar Shomuradova. They finished ninth in the qualification round for the group all-around and were the first reserve for the final.
