= Sevara Safoeva =

Uzbekistani rhythmic gymnast (born 2002)

Sevara Safoeva Севара Сафоева
- Full name: Sevara Sevdiyor qizi Safoev
- Born: 19 November 2002 (age 23) Navoiy, Uzbekistan
- Height: 1.70 m (5 ft 7 in)

Gymnastics career
- Discipline: Rhythmic gymnastics
- Country represented: Uzbekistan
- Head coach: Yekaterina Pirozhkova
Medal record
Rhythmic gymnastics
Representing Uzbekistan
Asian Championships
Gold medal – first place	2019 Pattaya	5 balls
Gold medal – first place	2019 Pattaya	4 clubs + 3 hoops
Gold medal – first place	2021 Tashkent	Group all-around
Gold medal – first place	2021 Tashkent	5 balls
Gold medal – first place	2021 Tashkent	4 clubs + 3 hoops
Silver medal – second place	2019 Pattaya	Group all-around

Sevara Sevdiyor qizi Safoeva (born 19 November 2002) is an Uzbekistani group rhythmic gymnast who represented Uzbekistan at the 2020 Summer Olympics. She also competed at the 2018 and 2019 World Championships.

== Career ==
Safoeva took up rhythmic gymnastics in 2010 at age seven. She became age-eligible for senior competitions and joined the national group in 2018. At the 2018 World Championships, the Safoeva and the Uzbekistani group finished 17th in the all-around.

At the 2019 Asian Championships in Thailand, Safoeva and the Uzbekistani group won two gold medals, as well as a silver in the all-around. They won the group all-around silver medal at the 2019 Tashkent World Cup. She then competed at the 2019 World Championships, where the group finished 14th in the all-around and did not receive one of the available Olympic berths.

Safoeva helped Uzbekistan win bronze medals in both apparatus finals and place fourth in the all-around at the 2020 Moscow Grand Prix. At the 2020 Tartu Grand Prix, they won the group all-around title and won silver medals in both apparatus finals. Safoeva and the group won two bronze medals at the 2021 Moscow Grand Prix. At the 2021 Tashkent World Cup, they won the group all-around gold medal. This marked the first time Uzbekistan won a group all-around competition at a FIG World Cup. They also won gold in the 5 balls final and picked up a silver medal in the 3 hoops and 4 clubs final.

Safoeva was also part of the Uzbekistani group that won the all-around at the 2021 Asian Championships, in addition to taking the gold in both the 5 balls and 4 clubs + 3 hoops finals. By winning the all-around title, Uzbekistan won the continental berth to the 2020 Summer Olympics. Before the Olympics, they competed at the Minsk World Challenge Cup and won the bronze medal in the all-around. Then at the 2021 Moscow World Challenge Cup, the group won the all-around bronze medal and silver medals in both apparatus finals.

At the 2020 Olympic Games, she competed alongside Kamola Irnazarova, Dinara Ravshanbekova, Kseniia Aleksandrova, and Nilufar Shomuradova. They finished ninth in the qualification round for the group all-around and were the first reserve for the final.
