= Evgeniia Levanova =

Russian rhythmic gymnast (born 2000)

Evgeniia Anatolyevna Levanova
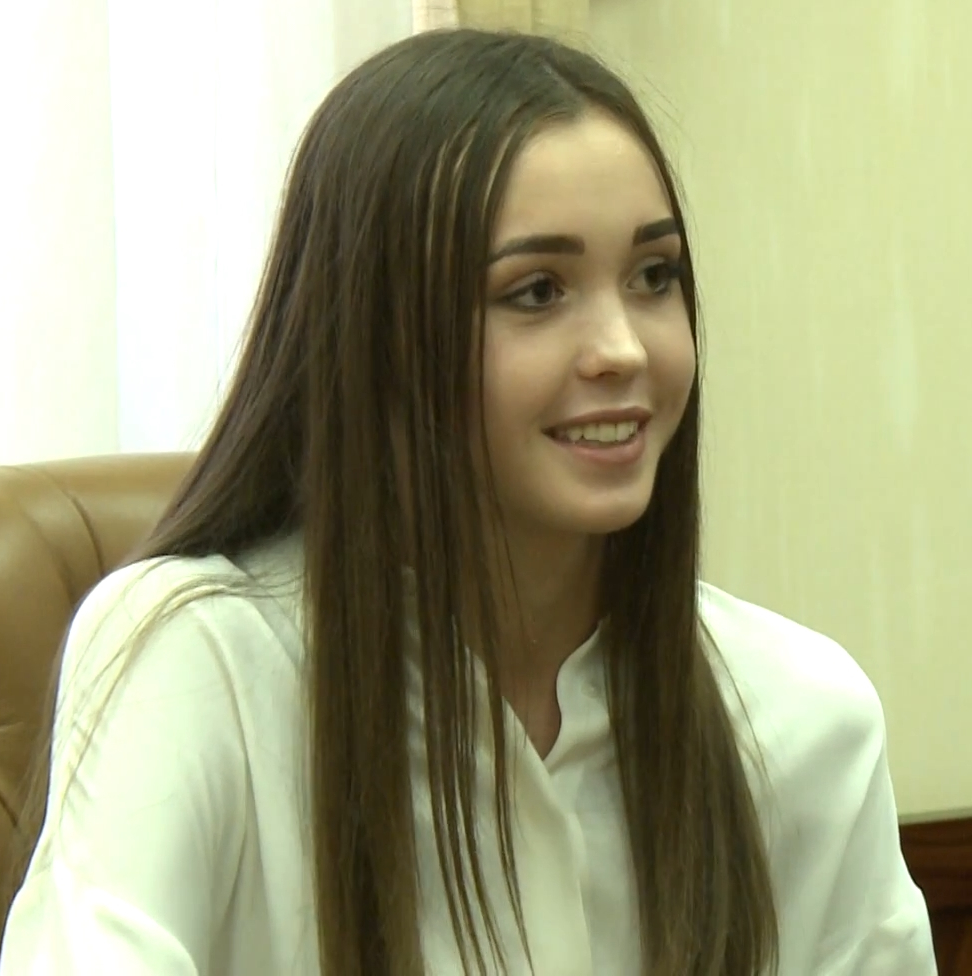
- Evgeniia Levanova in September 2018

Personal information
- Full name: Evgeniia Anatolyevna Levanova
- Nickname: Zhenya
- Born: 16 August 2000 (age 26) Cheboksary, Russia

Gymnastics career
- Discipline: Rhythmic gymnastics
- Country represented: Russia (2016)
- Gym: Novogorsk
- Head coach: Irina Viner
Medal record
Representing Russia
Group Rhythmic Gymnastics
World Championships
Gold medal – first place	2017 Pesaro	3 Balls + 2 Ropes
Gold medal – first place	2017 Pesaro	Group All-around
Gold medal – first place	2018 Sofia	Group All-around
Gold medal – first place	2019 Baku	Group All-around
Gold medal – first place	2019 Baku	3 Hoops + 4 Clubs
Silver medal – second place	2018 Sofia	3 Balls + 2 Ropes
Bronze medal – third place	2019 Baku	5 Balls

Evgeniia Levanova (Russian: Евгения Леванова; born 16 August 2000) is a Russian group rhythmic gymnast. She is a three-time (2017–2019) World Group all-around champion.

== Career ==
Evgeniia took up rhythmic gymnastics at the age of 4 in her home town Cheboksary, Russia. Her mother introduced her to this sport. At the age of 12, she entered the artistic gymnastics department of the Nizhny Novgorod School of the Olympic Reserve. She joined Russian National team in 2016.

In September 2019, Levanova and the Russian group won the Group All-Around title at the 2019 Rhythmic Gymnastics World Championships. They won bronze medal in 5 Balls final and another gold in 3 Hoops + 4 Clubs final the next day.

She competed at Grand Prix Moscow in 2020, and apparently retired sometime in 2021.

== Personal life ==
According to her social media, Evgeniia is dating a retired Russian figure skater Maxim Kovtun since 2018. In August 2021, the couple announced their engagement. They got married in November 2023.
