= Dinara Ravshanbekova =

Uzbekistani rhythmic gymnast (born 1999)

- Full name: Dinara Davronbekovna Ravshanbekova
- Born: 25 September 1999 (age 26) Tashkent, Uzbekistan
- Height: 1.70 m (5 ft 7 in)

Gymnastics career
- Discipline: Rhythmic gymnastics
- Country represented: Uzbekistan
- Head coach: Yekaterina Pirozhkova
Medal record
Rhythmic gymnastics
Representing Uzbekistan
Asian Championships
Gold medal – first place	2019 Pattaya	5 balls
Gold medal – first place	2019 Pattaya	4 clubs + 3 hoops
Gold medal – first place	2021 Tashkent	Group all-around
Gold medal – first place	2021 Tashkent	5 balls
Gold medal – first place	2021 Tashkent	4 clubs + 3 hoops
Silver medal – second place	2017 Astana	5 hoops
Silver medal – second place	2019 Pattaya	Group all-around

Dinara Davronbekovna Ravshanbekova (born 25 September 1999) is an Uzbekistani group rhythmic gymnast who represented Uzbekistan at the 2020 Summer Olympics. She also competed at the 2017, 2018, and 2019 World Rhythmic Gymnastics Championships.

== Career ==
Ravshanbekova began rhythmic gymnastics when she was six years old. She began competing internationally with the Uzbekistan national group in 2017.

Ravshanbekova helped Uzbekistan win the silver medal in the 5 balls final, behind Japan, at the 2017 Asian Championships, where they also finished fourth in the all-around. She competed at her first World Championships in 2017, and the group finished 10th in the all-around. Then at the 2018 World Championships, the group finished 17th in the all-around.

Ravshanbekova helped Uzbekistan win the group all-around silver medal at the 2019 Tashkent World Cup. Then at the 2019 Asian Championships, they won another group all-around silver medal, and they won both apparatus finals titles. At the 2019 World Championships, they finished 14th in the all-around and did not receive one of the available Olympic berths.

At the 2020 Moscow Grand Prix, Ravshanbekova and the group won bronze medals in both apparatus finals and placed fourth in the all-around. Then at the 2020 Tartu Grand Prix, they won the group all-around title and won silver medals in both apparatus finals. At the 2021 Moscow Grand Prix, she won a group all-around bronze medal, and the group also won a bronze medal in the 5 balls final. At the 2021 Tashkent World Cup, they won the group all-around gold medal. They also won gold in the 5 balls final and picked up a silver medal in the 3 hoops and 4 clubs final.

Ravshanbekova was part of the Uzbekistani group that won the all-around at the 2021 Asian Championships, where they also took home the gold in both the 5 balls and 4 clubs and 3 hoops finals. With this victory, Uzbekistan won the continental berth for the 2020 Summer Olympics. Before the Olympics, they competed at the Minsk World Challenge Cup and won the bronze medal in the all-around behind Israel and Bulgaria. At the 2021 Moscow World Challenge Cup, the group won the all-around bronze medal and silver medals in both apparatus finals.

At the 2020 Olympic Games, she competed alongside Kamola Irnazarova, Kseniia Aleksandrova, Sevara Safoeva, and Nilufar Shomuradova. They finished ninth in the qualification round for the group all-around and were the first reserve for the final.
