= Alannah Mathews =

Australian rhythmic gymnast

- Nickname: Lani
- Born: 9 April 1999 (age 27) Attadale, Western Australia
- Height: 1.72 m (5 ft 8 in)

Gymnastics career
- Discipline: Rhythmic gymnastics
- Country represented: Australia
- Club: Premier Gymnastics Academy
- Head coach: Gina Peluso

Alannah Mathews (born 9 April 1999) is an Australian group rhythmic gymnast who represented Australia at the 2020 Summer Olympics.

== Career ==
Mathews began rhythmic gymnastics when she was eight years old because her mother wanted her to engage in a sport.

Mathews began competing with Australia's senior rhythmic gymnastics group in 2015. At the 2018 World Championships, the group finished twenty-ninth in the all-around. This was the first time an Australian group had competed at the World Championships in ten years. She represented Australia at the 2019 Summer Universiade. She finished seventh in the group all-around, seventh in the 5 balls final, and fifth in the 3 hoops + 4 clubs final.

Mathews won a gold medal at the 2021 Oceanic Championships with the Australian senior group and qualified a quota for the 2020 Olympic Games. She was selected to represent Australia at the 2020 Summer Olympics alongside Emily Abbot, Alexandra Aristoteli, Himeka Onoda, and Felicity White. They were the first rhythmic gymnastics group to represent Australia at the Olympics. They finished fourteenth in the qualification round for the group all-around.
