= Kiko Yokota =

Japanese rhythmic gymnast

- Born: 11 May 1997 (age 29) Tokyo, Japan
- Height: 163 cm (5 ft 4 in)

Gymnastics career
- Discipline: Rhythmic gymnastics
- Country represented: Japan (2014–2021)
- Club: Adachi Rhythmic Gymnastics Club
- Retired: 2021
Medal record
Group rhythmic gymnastics
Representing Japan
World Championships
Gold medal – first place	2019 Baku	5 Balls
Silver medal – second place	2017 Pesaro	3 Ropes + 2 Balls
Silver medal – second place	2018 Sofia	5 Hoops
Silver medal – second place	2019 Baku	Group All-around
Silver medal – second place	2019 Baku	3 Hoops + 4 Clubs
Bronze medal – third place	2015 Suttgart	5 Ribbons
Bronze medal – third place	2017 Pesaro	Group All-around
Asian Championships
Gold medal – first place	2015 Jecheon	3 Clubs + 2 Hoops
Gold medal – first place	2019 Pattaya	Group All-Around
Silver medal – second place	2015 Jecheon	Group All-around
Silver medal – second place	2015 Jecheon	5 Ribbons
Silver medal – second place	2019 Pattaya	5 Balls
Bronze medal – third place	2019 Pattaya	3 Hoops + 4 Clubs

Kiko Yokota (横田 葵子, Yokota Kiko; born 11 May 1997) is a Japanese former group rhythmic gymnast. At the 2019 World Championships, she helped Japan win its first-ever group gold medal at a World Rhythmic Gymnastics Championships. She represented Japan at the 2016 Summer Olympics.

== Gymnastics career ==
Yokota began rhythmic gymnastics when she was ten years old and joined the national group in 2014. She competed at the 2014 World Championships with the group that placed eighth in the all-around. She helped Japan win the bronze medal in the 5 ribbons final at the 2015 World Championships, which was Japan's first Rhythmic Gymnastics World Championships medal in 40 years.

Yokota was selected to represent Japan at the 2016 Summer Olympics alongside her teammates Airi Hatakeyama, Sakura Noshitani, Sayuri Sugimoto and Rie Matsubara. They qualified for the group all-around final and finished in eighth place. This was the best-ever Olympic result for the Japanese rhythmic gymnastics group.

Yokota competed at the 2017 World Championships and helped Japan win the group all-around bronze medal, behind Russia and Bulgaria. They won another bronze medal in the 5 hoops final and then won the silver medal in the 3 balls and 2 ropes final. Then at the 2018 World Championships, they won the silver medal in the 5 balls final behind Bulgaria and finished fifth in the all-around.

At the 2019 Baku World Cup, Yokota helped Japan win the group all-around title and a silver medal in the 5 balls final. Then at the 2019 World Championships, she won a group all-around silver medal, which matched Japan's best-ever group all-around result from 1975. They then won the gold medal in the 5 balls final, becoming the first Japanese group to win a title at the Rhythmic Gymnastics World Championships. They also won the silver medal in the 3 hoops and 4 clubs final.

Yokota was selected for the team but was unable to compete at the 2020 Summer Olympics due to an injury. She announced her retirement from the sport in September 2021.
