= Nilufar Shomuradova =

Uzbekistani rhythmic gymnast (born 1999)

- Full name: Nilufar Oʻtkirovna Shomuradova
- Born: 7 July 1999 (age 27) Navoiy, Uzbekistan
- Height: 165 cm (5 ft 5 in)

Gymnastics career
- Discipline: Rhythmic gymnastics
- Country represented: Uzbekistan
- Head coach: Yekaterina Pirozhkova
- Retired: 2021
Medal record
Rhythmic gymnastics
Representing Uzbekistan
Asian Championships
Gold medal – first place	2019 Pattaya	5 balls
Gold medal – first place	2019 Pattaya	4 clubs + 3 hoops
Gold medal – first place	2021 Tashkent	Group all-around
Gold medal – first place	2021 Tashkent	5 balls
Gold medal – first place	2021 Tashkent	4 clubs + 3 hoops
Silver medal – second place	2019 Pattaya	Group all-around

Nilufar Oʻtkirovna Shomuradova (born 7 July 1999) is an Uzbekistani former rhythmic gymnast and team captain of the national group. She represented Uzbekistan at the 2020 Summer Olympics and is a five-time Asian champion.

== Career ==
Shomuradova took up rhythmic gymnastics in 2003, at the age of four. She joined Uzbekistan's senior national group in 2016 and moved to Tashkent. She competed at the 2018 World Championships, where the Uzbekistani group finished 17th in the all-around.

At the 2019 Asian Championships in Thailand, Shomuradova and the Uzbekistani group won two gold medals, as well as a silver in the all-around. She then competed at the 2019 World Championships, where the group finished 14th in the all-around and did not receive one of the available Olympic berths.

Shomuradova and the group won two bronze medals at the 2021 Moscow Grand Prix, including in the all-around. Then at the 2021 Tashkent World Cup, they won the group all-around gold medal. This marked the first time Uzbekistan won the group all-around at a FIG World Cup event. Additionally, they won a gold medal in the 5 balls final and picked up a silver medal in the 3 hoops and 4 clubs final.

Shomuradova was also part of the Uzbekistani group that won the all-around at the 2021 Asian Championships, taking the gold in both the 5 balls and 4 clubs and 3 hoops finals. Before the Olympics, the group competed at the Minsk World Challenge Cup and won the bronze medal in the all-around. At the Moscow World Challenge Cup, they won another all-around bronze medal and silver medals in both apparatus finals.

At the 2020 Olympic Games, she competed alongside Kamola Irnazarova, Dinara Ravshanbekova, Sevara Safoeva, and Kseniia Aleksandrova. They finished ninth in the qualification round for the group all-around and were the first reserve for the final. She announced her retirement from the sport after the Olympics.
