= Felicity White =

Australian rhythmic gymnast

- Nicknames: Flick, Felice, Speedy
- Born: 25 September 2000 (age 25) Sunnybank, Queensland
- Height: 1.67 m (5 ft 6 in)

Gymnastics career
- Discipline: Rhythmic gymnastics
- Country represented: Australia
- Club: Premier Gymnastics Academy
- Head coach: Gina Peluso

Felicity White (born 25 September 2000) is an Australian group rhythmic gymnast who represented Australia at the 2020 Summer Olympics.

== Career ==
White grew up studying ballet at the Queensland National Ballet School. She began rhythmic gymnastics when she was nine.

White began competing with Australia's senior rhythmic gymnastics group in 2018. At the 2018 World Championships, the group finished twenty-ninth in the all-around. This was the first time an Australian group had competed at the World Championships in ten years.

White won a gold medal at the 2021 Oceanic Championships with the Australian senior group and qualified a quota for the 2020 Olympic Games. She was selected to represent Australia at the 2020 Summer Olympics alongside Emily Abbot, Alexandra Aristoteli, Himeka Onoda, and Alannah Mathews. They were the first rhythmic gymnastics group to represent Australia at the Olympics. They finished fourteenth in the qualification round for the group all-around.
