= Sayuri Sugimoto =

Japanese rhythmic gymnast (born 1996)

- Born: 25 January 1996 (age 30) Nagoya, Aichi, Japan
- Height: 167 cm (5 ft 6 in)

Gymnastics career
- Discipline: Rhythmic gymnastics
- Country represented: Japan; (2011–2024)
- Club: Minami Gymnastics Club
Medal record
Group rhythmic gymnastics
Representing Japan
World Championships
Gold medal – first place	2019 Baku	5 Balls
Silver medal – second place	2017 Pesaro	3 Ropes + 2 Balls
Silver medal – second place	2018 Sofia	5 Hoops
Silver medal – second place	2019 Baku	Group All-around
Silver medal – second place	2019 Baku	3 Hoops + 4 Clubs
Bronze medal – third place	2015 Suttgart	5 Ribbons
Bronze medal – third place	2017 Pesaro	Group All-around
Bronze medal – third place	2017 Pesaro	5 Hoops
Bronze medal – third place	2021 Kitakyushu	5 Balls
Bronze medal – third place	2021 Kitakyushu	3 Hoops + 4 Clubs
Asian Championships
Gold medal – first place	2013 Tashkent	10 Clubs
Gold medal – first place	2015 Jecheon	3 Clubs + 2 Hoops
Gold medal – first place	2019 Pattaya	Group All-around
Silver medal – second place	2013 Tashkent	Group All-around
Silver medal – second place	2013 Tashkent	3 Balls + 2 Ribbons
Silver medal – second place	2015 Jecheon	Group All-around
Silver medal – second place	2015 Jecheon	5 Ribbons
Silver medal – second place	2019 Pattaya	5 Balls
Bronze medal – third place	2019 Pattaya	3 Hoops + 4 Clubs

Sayuri Sugimoto (杉本 早裕吏, Sugimoto Sayuri; born 25 January 1996) is a Japanese former rhythmic gymnast and captain of the national group. At the 2019 World Championships, she led Japan to its first-ever World title. She is a 2019 World group all-around silver medalist and a 2017 World group all-around bronze medalist. She represented Japan at the 2016 and 2020 Summer Olympics.

== Career ==
Sugimoto began rhythmic gymnastics when she was five years old after following her older sister into the sport.

=== 2013–2015 ===
Sugimoto helped Japan win a silver medal in the group all-around, behind China, at the 2013 Asian Championships. The group then won the gold medal in the 10 clubs final and the silver medal in the 3 balls and 2 ribbons final. At the 2013 World Championships, the group finished eighth in the group all-around, eighth in 10 clubs, and seventh in 3 balls and 2 ribbons. At the 2014 World Championships, they once again finished eighth in the all-around. She helped Japan win the bronze medal in the 5 ribbons final at the 2015 World Championships, which was Japan's first Rhythmic Gymnastics World Championships medal in 40 years.

=== 2016–2017 ===
Sugimoto was the team captain for the group that represented Japan at the 2016 Summer Olympics, including Airi Hatakeyama, Rie Matsubara, Sakura Noshitani, and Kiko Yokota. She led the group into the group all-around final where they finished in eighth place. This was the best-ever Olympic result for the Japanese rhythmic gymnastics group.

Sugimoto competed at the 2017 World Championships and won the group all-around bronze medal, behind Russia and Bulgaria. They won another bronze medal in the 5 hoops final and then won the silver medal in the 3 balls and 2 ropes final.

=== 2018–2019 ===
At the 2018 Minsk World Challenge Cup, Sugimoto helped Japan win the group all-around bronze medal. They then won the gold medal in the 3 balls and 2 ropes final. Then at the Kazan World Challenge Cup, they won the bronze medal in the 3 balls and 2 ropes final. At the 2018 World Championships, they won the silver medal in the 5 balls final behind Bulgaria and finished fifth in the all-around.

At the 2019 World Championships, Sugimoto helped Japan win a group all-around silver medal, which matched Japan's best-ever group all-around result from 1975. They then won the gold medal in the 5 balls final, becoming the first Japanese group to win a title at the Rhythmic Gymnastics World Championships. They also won the silver medal in the 3 hoops and 4 clubs final.

=== 2021 ===
Sugimoto represented Japan at the 2020 Summer Olympics as the team captain alongside Rie Matsubara, Sakura Noshitani, Ayuka Suzuki, and Nanami Takenaka. They advanced into the group all-around final and finished eighth after major mistakes in their 3 hoops and 4 clubs routine. After the Olympic Games, she competed at the 2021 World Championships, where Japan won bronze medals in both event finals and placed fourth in the all-around.
