= Japan at the 2012 Summer Olympics =

- IOC code: JPN
- NOC: Japanese Olympic Committee
- Website: www.joc.or.jp (in Japanese and English)

in London
- Competitors: 295 in 24 sports
- Flag bearer: Saori Yoshida (gold)
- Medals Ranked 11th: Gold 7 Silver 14 Bronze 17 Total 38

Summer Olympics appearances (overview)
- 1912; 1920; 1924; 1928; 1932; 1936; 1948; 1952; 1956; 1960; 1964; 1968; 1972; 1976; 1980; 1984; 1988; 1992; 1996; 2000; 2004; 2008; 2012; 2016; 2020; 2024; 2028

Japan, represented by Japanese Olympic Committee, competed at the 2012 Summer Olympics in London, from 27 July to 12 August 2012. Despite being London's third Olympic Games, Japan marked their London debut at this games. The nation also celebrated its centennial anniversary in the Olympics, having participated at every games since 1912 except for two editions; it was not invited to the 1948 Summer Olympics in London for its role in World War II, and was also part of the US-led boycott of the 1980 Summer Olympics in Moscow. Japan sent a total of 295 athletes to the Games, 138 men and 157 women, to compete in 24 sports.

Japan left London with a total of 38 medals (7 gold, 14 silver, and 17 bronze), finishing eleventh in the gold medal rankings and sixth in the overall medal rankings. This was also the nation's most successful Olympics, winning the largest number of medals in non-boycotted games. Eleven of these medals were awarded to the athletes in swimming, seven in judo, six in wrestling, and three in gymnastics. Five Japanese athletes won more than a single Olympic medal in London. With the absence of baseball and softball at the Olympics, Japan's team-based athletes proved successful in London, as women's football and women's volleyball teams won silver and bronze medals, respectively. For the first time since 1968, Japan had won two Olympic medals in men's boxing.

Among the nation's medalists were freestyle wrestlers Kaori Icho and Saori Yoshida, who successfully defended their Olympic titles in their respective events. Two-time Olympic silver medalist and gymnast Kōhei Uchimura won the coveted gold medal in individual all-around, becoming the fourth Japanese man to claim the title after 28 years. Meanwhile, Ryōta Murata became the first Japanese boxer to win an Olympic gold medal since 1960, in the men's middleweight division. Defending swimming champion Kosuke Kitajima, who aimed to win gold in two breaststroke events for third Games in succession, missed out on the medal standings in the finals.

== Medalists ==
The following Japanese competitors won medals at the Games. In the by discipline sections below, medalists' names are bolded.

Medal	Name	Sport	Event	Date
Gold	Kaori Matsumoto	Judo	Women's 57 kg	30 July
Gold	Kōhei Uchimura	Gymnastics	Men's artistic individual all-around	1 August
Gold	Hitomi Obara	Wrestling	Women's freestyle 48 kg	8 August
Gold	Kaori Icho	Wrestling	Women's freestyle 63 kg	8 August
Gold	Saori Yoshida	Wrestling	Women's freestyle 55 kg	9 August
Gold	Ryōta Murata	Boxing	Men's middleweight	11 August
Gold	Tatsuhiro Yonemitsu	Wrestling	Men's freestyle 66 kg	12 August
Silver	Hiroaki Hiraoka	Judo	Men's 60 kg	28 July
Silver	Hiromi Miyake	Weightlifting	Women's 48 kg	28 July
Silver	Riki Nakaya	Judo	Men's 73 kg	30 July
Silver	Ryohei Kato; Kazuhito Tanaka; Yusuke Tanaka; Kōhei Uchimura; Koji Yamamuro	Gymnastics	Men's artistic team all-around	30 July
Silver	Satomi Suzuki	Swimming	Women's 200 m breaststroke	2 August
Silver	Ryosuke Irie	Swimming	Men's 200 m backstroke	2 August
Silver	Takaharu Furukawa	Archery	Men's individual	3 August
Silver	Mika Sugimoto	Judo	Women's +78 kg	3 August
Silver	Ryosuke Irie; Kosuke Kitajima; Takeshi Matsuda; Takuro Fujii	Swimming	Men's 4 × 100 m medley relay	4 August
Silver	Mizuki Fujii; Reika Kakiiwa	Badminton	Women's doubles	4 August
Silver	Kōhei Uchimura	Gymnastics	Men's floor	5 August
Silver	Suguru Awaji; Kenta Chida; Ryo Miyake; Yuki Ota	Fencing	Men's team foil	5 August
Silver	Kasumi Ishikawa; Ai Fukuhara; Sayaka Hirano	Table tennis	Women's team	7 August
Silver	Miho Fukumoto; Ayumi Kaihori; Yukari Kinga; Azusa Iwashimizu; Saki Kumagai; Aya Sameshima; Kyoko Yano; Mizuho Sakaguchi; Aya Miyama (c); Nahomi Kawasumi; Homare Sawa; Asuna Tanaka; Kozue Ando; Shinobu Ohno; Karina Maruyama; Megumi Takase; Mana Iwabuchi; Yūki Ōgimi	Football	Women's tournament	9 August
Bronze	Kosuke Hagino	Swimming	Men's 400 m individual medley	28 July
Bronze	Masashi Ebinuma	Judo	Men's 66 kg	29 July
Bronze	Kaori Kawanaka; Ren Hayakawa; Miki Kanie	Archery	Women's team	29 July
Bronze	Aya Terakawa	Swimming	Women's 100 m backstroke	30 July
Bronze	Ryosuke Irie	Swimming	Men's 100 m backstroke	30 July
Bronze	Satomi Suzuki	Swimming	Women's 100 m breaststroke	30 July
Bronze	Yoshie Ueno	Judo	Women's 63 kg	31 July
Bronze	Takeshi Matsuda	Swimming	Men's 200 m butterfly	31 July
Bronze	Masashi Nishiyama	Judo	Men's 90 kg	1 August
Bronze	Ryo Tateishi	Swimming	Men's 200 m breaststroke	1 August
Bronze	Natsumi Hoshi	Swimming	Women's 200 m butterfly	1 August
Bronze	Aya Terakawa; Satomi Suzuki; Yuka Kato; Haruka Ueda	Swimming	Women's 4 × 100 m medley relay	4 August
Bronze	Koji Murofushi	Athletics	Men's hammer throw	5 August
Bronze	Ryūtarō Matsumoto	Wrestling	Men's Greco-Roman 60 kg	6 August
Bronze	Satoshi Shimizu	Boxing	Men's bantamweight	10 August
Bronze	Shinichi Yumoto	Wrestling	Men's freestyle 55 kg	10 August
Bronze	Hitomi Nakamichi; Yoshie Takeshita; Mai Yamaguchi; Erika Araki (c); Kaori Inoue; Maiko Kano; Yuko Sano; Ai Otomo; Risa Shinnabe; Saori Sakoda; Yukiko Ebata; Saori Kimura	Volleyball	Women's tournament	11 August

Medals by sport
**Sport**	1st place, gold medalist(s)	2nd place, silver medalist(s)	3rd place, bronze medalist(s)	Total
Wrestling	4	0	2	6
Judo	1	3	3	7
Gymnastics	1	2	0	3
Boxing	1	0	1	2
Swimming	0	3	8	11
Archery	0	1	1	2
Badminton	0	1	0	1
Weightlifting	0	1	0	1
Fencing	0	1	0	1
Table tennis	0	1	0	1
Football	0	1	0	1
Athletics	0	0	1	1
Volleyball	0	0	1	1
Total	7	14	17	38

Medals by gender
**Gender**	1st place, gold medalist(s)	2nd place, silver medalist(s)	3rd place, bronze medalist(s)	**Total**
Female	4	6	7	**17**
Male	3	8	10	**21**
Total	7	14	17	38

== Delegation ==
Japanese Olympic Committee (JOC) selected a team of 295 athletes, 138 men and 157 women, to compete in all sports except basketball, and handball; it was the nation's fifth-largest team sent to the Olympics, but the smallest since the 2000 Summer Olympics in Sydney. For the second time in its Olympic history, Japan was represented by more female than male athletes. There was only a single competitor in diving and in equestrian dressage.

The Japanese team included several past Olympic champions, three of them defending (freestyle wrestlers Kaori Icho and Saori Yoshida, and breaststroke swimmer Kosuke Kitajima). Yoshida, who won two consecutive gold medals in the Olympics before, became Japan's third female flag bearer at the opening ceremony since 2004, and the sixth in Olympic history. Javelin thrower and one-time world and Asian champion Yukifumi Murakami, on the other hand, served as the nation's team captain.

Dressage rider Hiroshi Hoketsu repeated his record from Beijing, as the oldest athlete to compete in these Olympic Games, at age 71. Single sculls rower Daisaku Takeda and show jumper Taizo Sugitani made their fifth appearance, having participated at every Olympic Games since 1996. Hammer thrower and former Olympic gold medalist Koji Murofushi, along with swimmer Kosuke Kitajima, was among the Japanese athletes who competed at their fourth Olympics. Meanwhile, breaststroke swimmer Kanako Watanabe, at age 15, was the youngest athlete of the team.

Other Japanese athletes featured gymnast and two-time Olympic silver medalist Kōhei Uchimura, javelin thrower and world junior champion Genki Dean, who embraced his British roots to represent the nation, table tennis player Ai Fukuhara, who became highly popular in China and Japan because of her nickname "China-dolls", and swimmers Ryosuke Irie and Takeshi Matsuda, who previously won the bronze medal in Beijing.

The following is the list of number of competitors participating in the Games. Note that reserves for fencing, field hockey, football, and handball are not counted as athletes:

Sport	Men	Women	Total
Archery	3	3	6
Athletics	28	18	46
Badminton	6	5	11
Boxing	4	0	4
Canoeing	5	3	8
Cycling	6	3	9
Diving	0	1	1
Equestrian	7	1	8
Fencing	3	5	8
Field hockey	0	16	16
Football	18	18	36
Gymnastics	7	12	19
Judo	7	7	14
Modern pentathlon	1	2	3
Rowing	2	3	5
Sailing	5	4	9
Shooting	2	2	4
Swimming	14	15	29
Synchronized swimming	0	9	9
Table tennis	3	3	6
Taekwondo	0	2	2
Tennis	3	0	3
Triathlon	2	3	5
Volleyball	2	14	16
Weightlifting	1	4	5
Wrestling	9	4	13
Total	138	157	295

== Archery ==
Japan has qualified one archer for the men's individual event and one archer for the women's individual event

Men

Athlete	Event	Ranking round		Round of 64	Round of 32	Round of 16	Quarterfinals	Semifinals	Final / BM	
Athlete	Event	Score	Seed	Opposition Score	Opposition Score	Opposition Score	Opposition Score	Opposition Score	Opposition Score	Rank
Takaharu Furukawa	Individual	679	5	Lee K W (HKG) (60); W 6–4	Hrachov (UKR) (28); W 6–4	Nesteng (NOR) (21); W 6–2	Mohamad (MAS) (20); W 6–2	van der Ven (NED) (16); W 6–5	Oh (KOR) (3); L 1–7	2nd place, silver medalist(s)
Yu Ishizu	Individual	671	15	Terry (GBR) (50); L 1–7	did not advance					
Hideki Kikuchi	Individual	659	44	Nesteng (NOR) (21); L 5–6	did not advance					
Takaharu Furukawa; Yu Ishizu; Hideki Kikuchi	Team	2009	5	—N/a		India (12); W 214 (29)–214 (27)	United States (4); L 219–220	did not advance		

Women

Athlete	Event	Ranking round		Round of 64	Round of 32	Round of 16	Quarterfinals	Semifinals	Final / BM	
Athlete	Event	Score	Seed	Opposition Score	Opposition Score	Opposition Score	Opposition Score	Opposition Score	Opposition Score	Rank
Ren Hayakawa	Individual	654	16	Bjerendal (SWE) (49); W 6–4	Stepanova (RUS) (17); W 7–3	Ki B-b (KOR) (1); L 0–6	did not advance			
Miki Kanie	Individual	665	6	Dorokhova (UKR) (59); W 7–1	Xu J (CHN) (27); W 6–0	Román (MEX) (11); L 3–7	did not advance			
Kaori Kawanaka	Individual	646	28	Schuh (FRA) (37); L 2–6	did not advance					
Ren Hayakawa; Miki Kanie; Kaori Kawanaka	Team	1965	5	—N/a		Ukraine (12); W 207–192	Mexico (4); W 219–209	South Korea (1); L 206–221	Russia (6); W 209–207	3rd place, bronze medalist(s)

== Athletics ==
Japanese athletes have so far achieved qualifying standards in the following athletics events (up to a maximum of 3 athletes in each event at the 'A' Standard, and 1 at the 'B' Standard):

Key

- Note–Ranks given for track events are within the athlete's heat only
- Q = Qualified for the next round
- q = Qualified for the next round as a fastest loser or, in field events, by position without achieving the qualifying target
- NR = National record
- N/A = Round not applicable for the event
- Bye = Athlete not required to compete in round

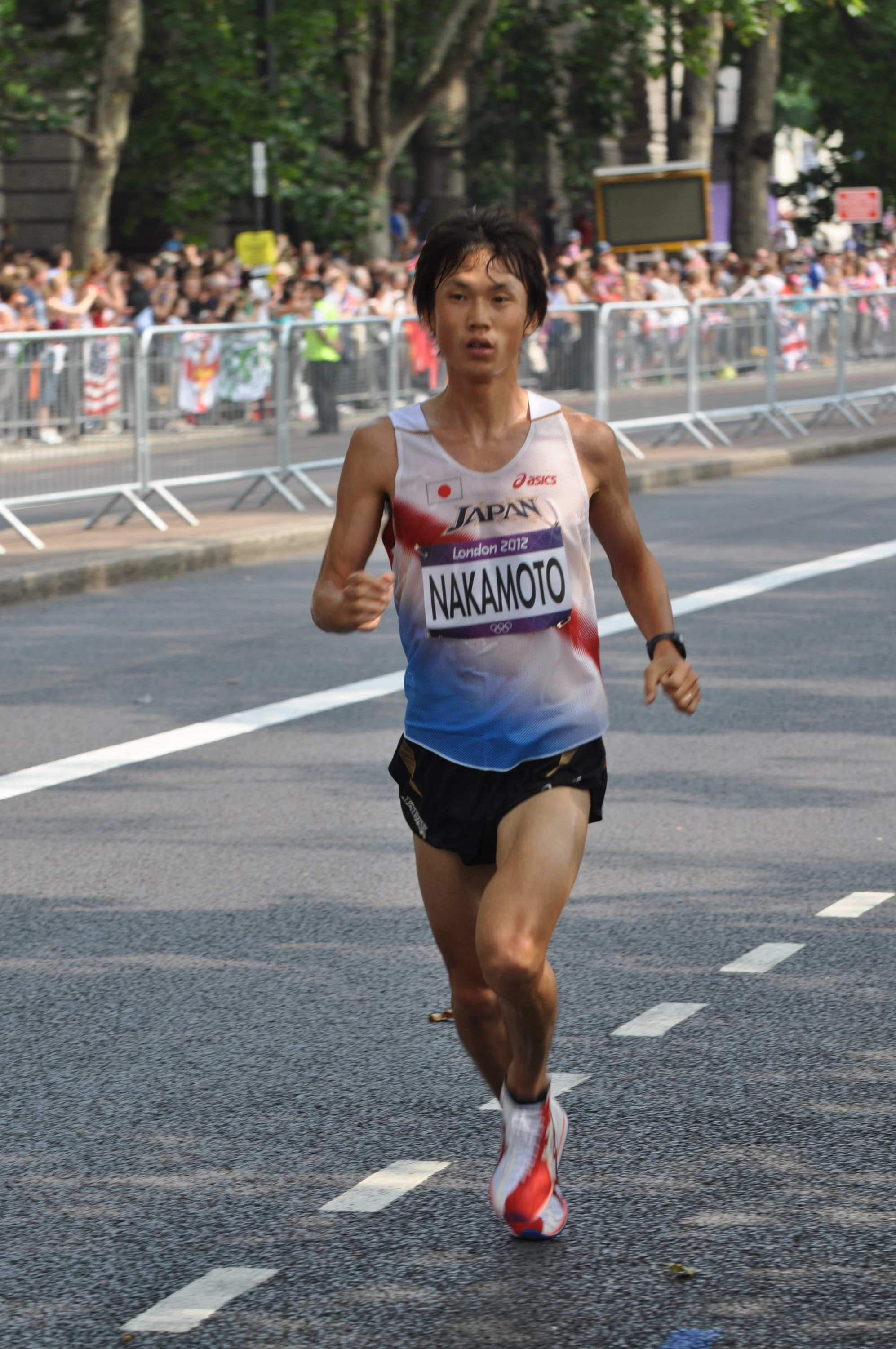
Kentaro Nakamoto finished sixth in men's marathon.

Men
Track & road events

Athlete	Event	Heat		Quarterfinal		Semifinal		Final	
Athlete	Event	Result	Rank	Result	Rank	Result	Rank	Result	Rank
Masashi Eriguchi	100 m	Bye		10.30	6	Did not advance			
Isamu Fujisawa	20 km walk	—N/a						1:21:48	18
Arata Fujiwara	Marathon	—N/a						2:19:11	45
Shota Iizuka	200 m	20.81	5	—N/a		Did not advance			
Yuzo Kanemaru	400 m	46.01	4	—N/a		Did not advance			
Takayuki Kishimoto	400 m hurdles	DSQ		—N/a		Did not advance			
Koichiro Morioka	50 km walk	—N/a						3:43:14	10
Kentaro Nakamoto	Marathon	—N/a						2:11:16	6
Akihiko Nakamura	400 m hurdles	DSQ		—N/a		Did not advance			
Takumi Saito	20 km walk	—N/a						1:22:43	25
Yuki Sato	5000 m	13:38.22	11	—N/a				Did not advance	
Yuki Sato	10,000 m	—N/a						28:44.06	22
Yusuke Suzuki	20 km walk	—N/a						1:23:53	36
Shinji Takahira	200 m	20.57	3 Q	—N/a		20.77	6	Did not advance	
Kei Takase	200 m	20.72	2 Q	—N/a		20.70	8	Did not advance	
Takayuki Tanii	50 km walk	—N/a						DNF	
Tetsuya Tateno	400 m hurdles	49.95	4	—N/a		Did not advance			
Ryota Yamagata	100 m	Bye		10.07	2 Q	10.10	6	did not advance	
Ryo Yamamoto	Marathon	—N/a						2:18:34	40
Yuki Yamazaki	50 km walk	—N/a						DSQ	
Masato Yokota	800 m	1:48.48	4	—N/a		Did not advance			
Masashi Eriguchi; Shota Iizuka; Takumi Kuki; Shinji Takahira; Ryota Yamagata	4 × 100 m relay	38.07	2 Q	—N/a				38.35	5
Yoshihiro Azuma; Yuzo Kanemaru; Hiroyuki Nakano; Kei Takase	4 × 400 m relay	3:03.86	6	—N/a				Did not advance	

Field events

Athlete	Event	Qualification		Final	
Athlete	Event	Distance	Position	Distance	Position
Genki Dean	Javelin throw	82.07	7 Q	79.95	10
Yukifumi Murakami	Javelin throw	77.80	24	Did not advance	
Koji Murofushi	Hammer throw	78.48	2 Q	78.71	3rd place, bronze medalist(s)
Seito Yamamoto	Pole vault	NM	—	Did not advance	

Combined events – Decathlon

Athlete	Event	100 m	LJ	SP	HJ	400 m	110H	DT	PV	JT	1500 m	Final	Rank
Keisuke Ushiro	Result	11.32	6.86	13.59	1.99	50.78	15.47	46.66	4.90	66.38	4:39.33	7842	20
Keisuke Ushiro	Points	791	781	703	794	779	794	801	880	834	685	7842	20

Women
Track & road events

Athlete	Event	Heat		Quarterfinal		Semifinal		Final	
Athlete	Event	Result	Rank	Result	Rank	Result	Rank	Result	Rank
Masumi Fuchise	20 km walk	—N/a						1:28:41	11
Kayoko Fukushi	10000 m	—N/a						31:10.35	10
Chisato Fukushima	100 m	Bye		11.41	5	Did not advance			
Chisato Fukushima	200 m	24.14	7	—N/a		Did not advance			
Mayumi Kawasaki	20 km walk	—N/a						1:30:20	18
Ayako Kimura	100 m hurdles	13.75	7	—N/a		Did not advance			
Ryoko Kizaki	Marathon	—N/a						2:27:16	16
Satomi Kubokura	400 m hurdles	55.85	5 q	—N/a		56.25	8	Did not advance	
Hitomi Niiya	10,000 m	—N/a						30:59.19	9
Kumi Otoshi	20 km walk	—N/a						1:33:50	37
Yoshimi Ozaki	Marathon	—N/a						2:27:43	19
Risa Shigetomo	Marathon	—N/a						2:40:06	79
Mika Yoshikawa	5000 m	15:16.77	13	—N/a				Did not advance	
Mika Yoshikawa	10000 m	—N/a						31:47.67	16
Anna Doi; Chisato Fukushima; Kana Ichikawa; Yumeka Sano; Momoko Takahashi	4 × 100 m relay	44.25	8	—N/a				Did not advance	

Field events

Athlete	Event	Qualification		Final	
Athlete	Event	Distance	Position	Distance	Position
Tomomi Abiko	Pole vault	4.25	=19	Did not advance	
Yuki Ebihara	Javelin throw	59.25	16	Did not advance	

== Badminton ==
Men

Athlete	Event	Group stage				Elimination	Quarterfinal	Semifinal	Final / BM	
Athlete	Event	Opposition Score	Opposition Score	Opposition Score	Rank	Opposition Score	Opposition Score	Opposition Score	Opposition Score	Rank
Sho Sasaki	Singles	Soeroredjo (SUR); W 21–12, 21–7	—N/a		1 Q	Cordón (GUA); W 23–21, 21–10	Lin D (CHN); L 12–21, 21–16, 16–21	Did not advance		
Kenichi Tago	Singles	Karunaratne (SRI); L 18–21, 16–21	—N/a		2	Did not advance				
Naoki Kawamae; Shoji Sato	Doubles	Koo K K / Tan B H (MAS); L 12–21, 14–21	Jung J-s / Lee Y-d (KOR); L 21–16, 21–15	Bach / Gunawan (USA); W 21–15, 21–15	3	—N/a	Did not advance			

Women

Athlete	Event	Group stage				Elimination	Quarterfinal	Semifinal	Final / BM	
Athlete	Event	Opposition Score	Opposition Score	Opposition Score	Rank	Opposition Score	Opposition Score	Opposition Score	Opposition Score	Rank
Sayaka Sato	Singles	Egelstaff (GBR); W 18–21, 21–16, 21-12	Tvrdy (SLO); W 22–20, 21–18	—N/a	1 Q	Baun (DEN); W 15–14^{ret}	Retired			
Mizuki Fujii; Reika Kakiiwa	Doubles	Gutta / Ponnappa (IND); W 21–16, 21–18	Cheng W-h / Chien Y-c (TPE); L 19–21, 11–21	Sari / Yao L (SIN); W 16–21, 21–10, 21–19	2 Q	—N/a	Juhl / Pedersen (DEN); W 22–20, 21–10	Bruce / Li (CAN); W 21–12, 19–21, 21–13	Tian Q / Zhao Yl (CHN); L 10–21, 23–25	2nd place, silver medalist(s)
Miyuki Maeda; Satoko Suetsuna	Doubles	Tian Q / Zhao Yl (CHN); L 16–21, 17–21	Poon L Y / Tse Y S (HKG); W 21–15, 21–19	Pedersen / Juhl (DEN); W 18–21, 21–14, 21–18	3	—N/a	Did not advance			

Mixed

Athlete	Event	Group stage				Quarterfinal	Semifinal	Final / BM	
Athlete	Event	Opposition Score	Opposition Score	Opposition Score	Rank	Opposition Score	Opposition Score	Opposition Score	Rank
Shintaro Ikeda; Reiko Shiota	Doubles	Fischer Nielsen / Pedersen (DEN); L 11–21, 10–21	Mateusiak / Zięba (POL); L 18–21, 20–22	Ng / Gao (CAN); W 21–10, 11–21, 21–15	3	Did not advance			

== Boxing ==
Japan has so far qualified boxers for the following events

Men

Athlete	Event	Round of 32	Round of 16	Quarterfinals	Semifinals	Final	
Athlete	Event	Opposition Result	Opposition Result	Opposition Result	Opposition Result	Opposition Result	Rank
Katsuaki Susa	Flyweight	Ramírez (CUB); L 14–13	Did not advance				
Satoshi Shimizu	Bantamweight	Dogboe (GHA); W 10–9	Abdulhamidov (AZE); W RSC	Ouadahi (ALG); W 17–15	Campbell (GBR); L 11–20	Did not advance	3rd place, bronze medalist(s)
Yasuhiro Suzuki	Welterweight	Khalsi (MAR); W 14–13	Sapiyev (KAZ); L 25–11	Did not advance			
Ryota Murata	Middleweight	Bye	Rahou (ALG); W 21–12	Kılıççı (TUR); W 17–13	Atoev (UZB); W 13–12	Falcão (BRA); W 14–13	1st place, gold medalist(s)

== Canoeing ==
=== Slalom ===
Japan has qualified boats for the following events

Athlete	Event	Preliminary						Semifinal		Final	
Athlete	Event	Run 1	Rank	Run 2	Rank	Total	Rank	Time	Rank	Time	Rank
Takuya Haneda	Men's C-1	101.13	12	92.72	2	92.72	3 Q	104.16	6 Q	110.62	7
Kazuki Yazawa	Men's K-1	96.66	18	92.57	13	92.57	15 Q	99.99	9 Q	104.44	9
Moe Kaifuchi	Women's K-1	171.63	19	121.29	17	121.29	19	Did not advance – Report			

=== Sprint ===
Japan has qualified boats for the following events

Athlete	Event	Heats		Semifinals		Final	
Athlete	Event	Time	Rank	Time	Rank	Time	Rank
Momotaro Matsushita	Men's K-1 200 m	36.096	3 Q	37.201	7 FB	38.040	11
Naoya Sakamoto	Men's C-1 200 m	41.528	3 Q	41.771	3 FA	44.699	8
Momotaro Matsushita; Hiroki Watanabe	Men's K-2 200 m	34.669	6 FB	Bye		35.739	10
Shinobu Kitamoto	Women's K-1 200 m	42.007	1 Q	41.816	3 FB	45.387	13
Shinobu Kitamoto; Asumi Ōmura	Women's K-2 500 m	1:47.323	6	Did not advance			

Qualification Legend: FA = Qualify to final (medal); FB = Qualify to final B (non-medal)

== Cycling ==
Japan had qualified the following cyclists for the Games.

=== Road ===
Athlete	Event	Time	Rank
Yukiya Arashiro	Men's road race	5:46:37	48
Fumiyuki Beppu	Men's road race	5:46:05	22
Fumiyuki Beppu	Men's time trial	55:40.64	24
Mayuko Hagiwara	Women's road race	Did not finish	

=== Track ===
Sprint

Athlete	Event	Qualification		Round 1	Repechage 1	Round 2	Repechage 2	Quarterfinals	Semifinals	Final	
Athlete	Event	Time Speed (km/h)	Rank	Opposition Time Speed (km/h)	Opposition Time Speed (km/h)	Opposition Time Speed (km/h)	Opposition Time Speed (km/h)	Opposition Time Speed (km/h)	Opposition Time Speed (km/h)	Opposition Time Speed (km/h)	Rank
Seiichiro Nakagawa	Men's sprint	10.144; 70.977	7	Watkins (USA); L	Zieliński (POL); W 10.792; 66.716	Baugé (FRA); L	Canelón (VEN); Awang (MAS); L	Did not advance		9th place final Kelemen (CZE); Esterhuizen (RSA); Canelón (VEN); W 10.950	9
Kayono Maeda	Women's sprint	11.600; 62.068	17	Meares (AUS); L	Sullivan (CAN); Lee H-j (KOR); L	Did not advance					

Team sprint

Athlete	Event	Qualification		Semifinals		Final	
Athlete	Event	Time Speed (km/h)	Rank	Opposition Time Speed (km/h)	Rank	Opposition Time Speed (km/h)	Rank
Seiichiro Nakagawa; Yudai Nitta; Kazunari Watanabe	Men's team sprint	44.324; 60.915	8 Q	Great Britain; L 43.964; 61.413	8	Did not advance	

Keirin

Athlete	Event	1st round	Repechage	2nd round	Final
Athlete	Event	Rank	Rank	Rank	Rank
Kazunari Watanabe	Men's keirin	6 R	1 Q	6	11

=== Mountain biking ===
Athlete	Event	Time	Rank
Kohei Yamamoto	Men's cross-country	1:35:26	27
Rie Katayama	Women's cross-country	1:38:26	20

== Diving ==
Japan has qualified in the following events.

Women

Athlete	Event	Preliminaries		Semifinals		Final	
Athlete	Event	Points	Rank	Points	Rank	Points	Rank
Mai Nakagawa	10 m platform	327.65	8 Q	260.05	18	Did not advance	

== Equestrian ==
Currently, Japan has qualified eight athletes for the Games.

=== Dressage ===
Athlete	Horse	Event	Grand Prix		Grand Prix Special		Grand Prix Freestyle		Overall	
Athlete	Horse	Event	Score	Rank	Score	Rank	Technical	Artistic	Score	Rank
Hiroshi Hoketsu	Whisper	Individual	68.739	40	Did not advance					

=== Eventing ===
Athlete	Horse	Event	Dressage		Cross-country			Jumping						Total	
Athlete	Horse	Event	Dressage		Cross-country			Qualifier			Final			Total	
Athlete	Horse	Event	Penalties	Rank	Penalties	Total	Rank	Penalties	Total	Rank	Penalties	Total	Rank	Penalties	Rank
Atsushi Negishi	Pretty Darling	Individual	50.40	33	25.60	76.00	40	12.00	88.00	39	Did not advance			88.00	39
Yoshiaki Oiwa	Noonday de Conde	Individual	38.10	1	Eliminated			Did not advance							
Kenki Sato	Chippieh	Individual	42.20	15	Eliminated			Did not advance							
Toshiyuki Tanaka	Marquis De Plescop	Individual	55.00	52	60.00	115.00	55	4.00	119.00	48	Did not advance			119.00	48
Takayuki Yumira	Latina	Individual	58.50	=58	Eliminated			Did not advance							
Atsushi Negishi; Yoshiaki Oiwa; Kenki Sato; Toshiyuki Tanaka; Takayuki Yumira	See above	Team	130.70	6	1060.30	1191.00	13	16.00	1207.00	12	—N/a			1207.00	12

=== Show jumping ===
Athlete	Horse	Event	Qualification								Final					Total	
Athlete	Horse	Event	Round 1		Round 2			Round 3			Round A		Round B			Total	
Athlete	Horse	Event	Penalties	Rank	Penalties	Total	Rank	Penalties	Total	Rank	Penalties	Rank	Penalties	Total	Rank	Penalties	Rank
Taizo Sugitani	Avenzio	Individual	0	=1 Q	4	4	=17 Q	8	12	=26 Q	14	33	Did not advance			14	33
Reiko Takeda	Ari	Individual	22	71	Did not advance											22	71

== Fencing ==
Japan has qualified 8 fencers.

Men

Athlete	Event	Round of 64	Round of 32	Round of 16	Quarterfinal	Semifinal	Final / BM	
Athlete	Event	Opposition Score	Opposition Score	Opposition Score	Opposition Score	Opposition Score	Opposition Score	Rank
Kenta Chida	Individual foil	Bye	Sintes (FRA); L 11–15	Did not advance				
Ryo Miyake	Individual foil	Bye	Baldini (ITA); L 6–15	Did not advance				
Yuki Ota	Individual foil	Bye	Kleibrink (GER); W 15–5	Cassarà (ITA); L 14–15	Did not advance			
Suguru Awaji; Kenta Chida; Ryo Miyake; Yuki Ota	Team foil	—N/a			China; W 45–30	Germany; W 41–40	Italy; L 39–45	2nd place, silver medalist(s)

Women

Athlete	Event	Round of 64	Round of 32	Round of 16	Quarterfinal	Semifinal	Final / BM	
Athlete	Event	Opposition Score	Opposition Score	Opposition Score	Opposition Score	Opposition Score	Opposition Score	Rank
Nozomi Nakano	Individual épée	Bye	Fiamingo (ITA); L 11–15	Did not advance				
Kanae Ikehata	Individual foil	Bye	Gruchała (POL); W 9–8	Thibus (FRA); W 15–11	Nam H-H (KOR); L 6–15	Did not advance		
Shiho Nishioka	Individual foil	Heung (HKG); W 13–10	Vezzali (ITA); L 8–14	Did not advance				
Chieko Sugawara	Individual foil	Bye	Jeon H-S (KOR); W 15–13	Maîtrejean (FRA); W 15–9	Di Francisca (ITA); L 9–15	Did not advance		
Kanae Ikehata; Kyomi Hirata; Shiho Nishioka; Chieko Sugawara	Team foil	—N/a			Russia; L 17–45	Classification semi-final United States; L 22–44	7th place final Great Britain; W 30–21	7
Seira Nakayama	Individual sabre	—N/a	Perrus (FRA); W 15–12	Zagunis (USA); L 9–15	Did not advance			

== Field hockey ==
Japan has qualified 1 team.

- Women's event – 1 team of 16 players.

=== Women's tournament ===
The following is the Japan roster in the women's field hockey tournament of the 2012 Summer Olympics.

Head Coach: Zenjiro Yasuda

1. Sakiyo Asano (GK)
2. Nagisa Hayashi
3. Akemi Kato
4. Sachimi Iwao
5. Miyuki Nakagawa
6. Ai Murakami
7. Shiho Otsuka
8. Yukari Yamamoto (C)
9. Aki Mitsuhashi
10. Rika Komazawa
11. Kaori Fujio
12. Akane Shibata
13. Chie Akutsu
14. Keiko Manabe
17. Masako Sato
21. Izuki Tanaka

Reserves:

- Mika Imura
- Ryoko Oie (GK)

Group play

Pos	Team	Pld	W	D	L	GF	GA	GD	Pts	Qualification
1	Netherlands	5	5	0	0	12	5	+7	15	Semi-finals
2	Great Britain (H)	5	3	0	2	14	7	+7	9	Semi-finals
3	China	5	2	1	2	6	3	+3	7	
4	South Korea	5	2	0	3	9	13	−4	6	
5	Japan	5	1	1	3	4	9	−5	4	
6	Belgium	5	0	2	3	2	10	−8	2	

Source: FIH
Rules for classification: 1) Points; 2) Matches won; 3) Goal difference; 4) Goals for; 5) Head-to-head result.
(H) Hosts

29 July 2012
19:00

Great Britain	4–0	Japan
Danson 7', 28'; Thomas 23'; Walton 26'	Report

Umpires:
Kelly Hudson (NZL)
Soledad Iparraguirre (ARG)

31 July 2012
08:30

Netherlands	3–2	Japan
Lammers 4', 43'; Hoog 30'	Report	Komazawa 46'; Mitsuhashi 53'

Umpires:
Kang Hyun-young (KOR)
Irene Presenqui (ARG)

2 August 2012
08:30

South Korea	1–0	Japan
Cheon Seul-ki 42'	Report

Umpires:
Miao Lin (CHN)
Frances Block (GBR)

4 August 2012
13:45

Japan	1–1	Belgium
Yamamoto 58'	Report	Boon 34'

Umpires:
Stella Bartlema (NED)
Wendy Stewart (CAN)

6 August 2012
13:45

Japan	1–0	China
Komazawa 54'	Report

Umpires:
Elena Eskina (RUS)
Kelly Hudson (NZL)

9th/10th place

8 August 2012
08:30

Japan	2–1 (a.e.t.)	South Africa
Murakami 63', 80'	Report	Deetlefs 27'

Umpires:
Stella Bartlema (NED)
Amy Hassick (USA)

== Football ==
Japan is qualified for the men's and women's event

- Men's team event – 1 team of 18 players
- Women's team event – 1 team of 18 players

=== Men's tournament ===
Squad

The following is the Japan roster in the men's football tournament of the 2012 Summer Olympics.

Coach: Takashi Sekizuka

No.	Pos.	Player	Date of birth (age)	Caps	Goals	2012 club
1	GK	Shuichi Gonda	3 March 1989 (aged 23)			(Japan Football Association) FC Tokyo
2	DF	Yuhei Tokunaga*	25 September 1983 (aged 28)			(Japan Football Association) FC Tokyo
3	MF	Takahiro Ogihara	5 October 1991 (aged 20)			(Japan Football Association) Cerezo Osaka
4	DF	Hiroki Sakai	12 April 1990 (aged 22)			(German Football Association) Hannover 96
5	DF	Maya Yoshida* (c)	24 August 1988 (aged 23)			(Royal Dutch Football Association) VVV-Venlo
6	DF	Taisuke Muramatsu	16 December 1989 (aged 22)			(Japan Football Association) Shimizu S-Pulse
7	FW	Yuki Otsu	24 March 1990 (aged 22)			(German Football Association) Borussia Mönchengladbach
8	DF	Kazuya Yamamura	2 December 1989 (aged 22)			(Japan Football Association) Kashima Antlers
9	FW	Kenyu Sugimoto	18 November 1992 (aged 19)			(Japan Football Association) Tokyo Verdy
10	MF	Keigo Higashi	20 July 1990 (aged 22)			(Japan Football Association) Omiya Ardija
11	FW	Kensuke Nagai	5 March 1989 (aged 23)			(Japan Football Association) Nagoya Grampus
12	DF	Gotoku Sakai	14 March 1991 (aged 21)			(German Football Association) VfB Stuttgart
13	DF	Daisuke Suzuki	29 January 1990 (aged 22)			(Japan Football Association) Albirex Niigata
14	MF	Takashi Usami	6 May 1992 (aged 20)			(German Football Association) TSG Hoffenheim
15	FW	Manabu Saito	4 April 1990 (aged 22)			(Japan Football Association) Yokohama F. Marinos
16	MF	Hotaru Yamaguchi	6 October 1990 (aged 21)			(Japan Football Association) Cerezo Osaka
17	MF	Hiroshi Kiyotake	12 November 1989 (aged 22)			(German Football Association) 1. FC Nürnberg
18	GK	Shunsuke Ando	10 August 1990 (aged 21)			(Japan Football Association) Kawasaki Frontale

* Over-aged player.

Group play

Pos	Team	Pld	W	D	L	GF	GA	GD	Pts	Qualification
1	Japan	3	2	1	0	2	0	+2	7	Advance to knockout stage
2	Honduras	3	1	2	0	3	2	+1	5	Advance to knockout stage
3	Morocco	3	0	2	1	2	3	−1	2	
4	Spain	3	0	1	2	0	2	−2	1	

Source: FIFA
Rules for classification: Group stage tiebreakers
26 July 2012
14:45

Spain	0–1	Japan
	Report	Ōtsu 34'

Hampden Park, Glasgow
Attendance: 37,726
Referee: Mark Geiger (United States)

29 July 2012
17:00

Japan	1–0	Morocco
Nagai 84'	Report

St James' Park, Newcastle
Attendance: 24,936
Referee: Svein Oddvar Moen (Norway)

1 August 2012
17:00

Japan	0–0	Honduras
	Report

City of Coventry Stadium, Coventry
Attendance: 25,862
Referee: Slim Jedidi (Tunisia)

Quarter-final

4 August 2012
12:00

Japan	3–0	Egypt
Nagai 14'; Yoshida 78'; Ōtsu 83'	Report

Old Trafford, Manchester
Attendance: 70,772
Referee: Mark Geiger (United States)

Semi-final

7 August 2012
17:00

Mexico	3–1	Japan
Fabián 31'; Peralta 65'; Cortés 90+3'	Report	Ōtsu 12'

Wembley Stadium, London
Attendance: 82,372
Referee: Gianluca Rocchi (Italy)

Bronze medal game

10 August 2012
19:45

South Korea	2–0	Japan
Park Chu-young 38'; Koo Ja-cheol 57'	Report

Millennium Stadium, Cardiff
Attendance: 56,393
Referee: Ravshan Irmatov (Uzbekistan)

Final rank
4th place.

=== Women's tournament ===
Squad

Head coach: Norio Sasaki

Japan named a squad of 18 players and 4 alternates for the tournament.

No.	Pos.	Player	Date of birth (age)	Caps	Goals	Club
1	GK	Miho Fukumoto	2 October 1983 (aged 28)	60	0	(Japan Football Association) Okayama Yunogo Belle
2	DF	Yukari Kinga	2 May 1984 (aged 28)	79	5	(Japan Football Association) INAC Leonessa
3	DF	Azusa Iwashimizu	14 October 1986 (aged 25)	77	8	(Japan Football Association) NTV Beleza
4	DF	Saki Kumagai	17 October 1990 (aged 21)	41	0	(German Football Association) 1. FFC Frankfurt
5	DF	Aya Sameshima	16 June 1987 (aged 25)	45	2	(Japan Football Association) Vegalta Sendai
6	MF	Mizuho Sakaguchi	15 October 1987 (aged 24)	53	16	(Japan Football Association) NTV Beleza
7	FW	Kozue Ando	9 July 1982 (aged 30)	103	17	(German Football Association) FCR 2001 Duisburg
8	MF	Aya Miyama (captain)	28 January 1985 (aged 27)	112	27	(Japan Football Association) Okayama Yunogo Belle
9	MF	Nahomi Kawasumi	23 September 1985 (aged 26)	31	8	(Japan Football Association) INAC Leonessa
10	MF	Homare Sawa	6 September 1978 (aged 33)	179	80	(Japan Football Association) INAC Leonessa
11	FW	Shinobu Ohno	23 January 1984 (aged 28)	105	37	(Japan Football Association) INAC Leonessa
12	DF	Kyoko Yano	3 June 1984 (aged 28)	72	1	(Japan Football Association) Urawa Red Diamonds
13	FW	Karina Maruyama	26 March 1983 (aged 29)	70	14	(Japan Football Association) Speranza F.C. Osaka-Takatsuki
14	MF	Asuna Tanaka	23 April 1988 (aged 24)	13	3	(Japan Football Association) INAC Leonessa
15	FW	Megumi Takase	10 November 1990 (aged 21)	26	5	(Japan Football Association) INAC Leonessa
16	FW	Mana Iwabuchi	18 March 1993 (aged 19)	11	2	(Japan Football Association) NTV Beleza
17	FW	Yūki Ōgimi	15 July 1987 (aged 25)	83	36	(German Football Association) 1. FFC Turbine Potsdam
18	GK	Ayumi Kaihori	4 September 1986 (aged 25)	31	0	(Japan Football Association) INAC Leonessa

Group play

Pos	Team	Pld	W	D	L	GF	GA	GD	Pts	Qualification
1	Sweden	3	1	2	0	6	3	+3	5	Qualified for the quarter-finals
2	Japan	3	1	2	0	2	1	+1	5	Qualified for the quarter-finals
3	Canada	3	1	1	1	6	4	+2	4	Qualified for the quarter-finals
4	South Africa	3	0	1	2	1	7	−6	1	

Source: IOC
25 July 2012
17:00

Japan	2–1	Canada
Kawasumi 33'; Miyama 44'	Report	Tancredi 55'

City of Coventry Stadium, Coventry
Attendance: 14,119
Referee: Kirsi Heikkinen (Finland)

28 July 2012
12:00

Japan	0–0	Sweden
	Report; Report

City of Coventry Stadium, Coventry
Attendance: 14,160
Referee: Quetzalli Alvarado (Mexico)

31 July 2012
14:30

Japan	0–0	South Africa
	Report

Millennium Stadium, Cardiff
Attendance: 24,202
Referee: Efthalia Mitsi (Greece)

Quarter-final

3 August 2012
17:00

Brazil	0–2	Japan
	Report	Ōgimi 27'; Ohno 73'

Millennium Stadium, Cardiff
Attendance: 28,528
Referee: Kirsi Heikkinen (Finland)

Semi-final

6 August 2012
17:00

France	1–2	Japan
Le Sommer 76'	Report	Ōgimi 32'; Sakaguchi 49'

Wembley Stadium, London
Attendance: 61,482
Referee: Quetzalli Alvarado (Mexico)

Gold medal game

9 August 2012
19:45

(gold) United States	2–1	Japan (silver)
Lloyd 8', 54'	Report	Ōgimi 63'

Wembley Stadium, London
Attendance: 80,203
Referee: Bibiana Steinhaus (Germany)

== Gymnastics ==
=== Artistic ===
Men
Team

Athlete	Event	Qualification								Final							
Athlete	Event	Apparatus						Total	Rank	Apparatus						Total	Rank
Athlete	Event	F	PH	R	V	PB	HB	Total	Rank	F	PH	R	V	PB	HB	Total	Rank
Ryohei Kato	Team	15.433	14.333	—N/a	15.900	—N/a				15.300	14.766	—N/a	16.041	—N/a			
Kazuhito Tanaka	Team	13.666	12.200	15.100	15.750	15.725 Q	14.400	86.841	22 *	13.733	13.433	—N/a		15.366	15.166	—N/a	
Yusuke Tanaka	Team	—N/a		15.033	—N/a	15.866 Q	14.200	—N/a		—N/a		15.200	—N/a	15.500	16.000	—N/a	
Kōhei Uchimura	Team	15.766 Q	12.466	14.966	16.033	15.533	15.000	89.764	9 Q	15.700	14.166	15.133	15.900	15.416	15.733	—N/a	
Koji Yamamuro	Team	14.433	14.400	14.900	15.333	14.200	14.366	87.632	18 Q	—N/a		15.366	14.033	—N/a			
Total	Team	45.632	41.199	45.099	47.683	47.124	43.766	270.503	5 Q	44.733	42.365	45.699	45.971	46.282	46.899	271.952	2nd place, silver medalist(s)

* On 30 July, Koji Yamamuro was injured on vault during the men's team final. It was announced that he would not compete in the individual all-around final as a result, and that his teammate, Kazuhito Tanaka would be able to compete instead.

Individual finals

Athlete	Event	Apparatus						Total	Rank
Athlete	Event	F	PH	R	V	PB	HB	Total	Rank
Kazuhito Tanaka	All-around	14.166	13.433	15.200	15.533	15.500	15.575	89.407	6
Kazuhito Tanaka	Parallel bars	—N/a				15.500	—N/a	15.500	4
Yusuke Tanaka	Parallel bars	—N/a				15.100	—N/a	15.100	8
Kōhei Uchimura	All-around	15.100	15.066	15.333	16.266	15.325	15.600	92.690	1st place, gold medalist(s)
Kōhei Uchimura	Floor	15.800	—N/a					15.800	2nd place, silver medalist(s)
Koji Yamamuro	All-around	Withdrew due to injury							

Women
Team

Athlete	Event	Qualification						Final					
Athlete	Event	Apparatus				Total	Rank	Apparatus				Total	Rank
Athlete	Event	F	V	UB	BB	Total	Rank	F	V	UB	BB	Total	Rank
Yu Minobe	Team	12.966	—N/a	13.066	14.133	—N/a		13.100	—N/a			—N/a	
Yuko Shintake	Team	13.633	13.633	—N/a	14.166	—N/a		13.266	—N/a		13.433	—N/a	
Rie Tanaka	Team	13.300	13.000	14.633	13.400	54.333	27 Q	—N/a	14.416	14.333	12.833	—N/a	
Asuka Teramoto	Team	14.233	14.600	14.566	14.466	57.865	8 Q	14.233	14.700	14.200	13.900	—N/a	
Koko Tsurumi	Team	—N/a	13.800	15.033Q	—N/a			—N/a	13.766	14.466	—N/a		
Total	Team	41.166	42.033	44.232	42.765	170.196	6 Q	40.599	42.882	42.999	40.166	166.646	8

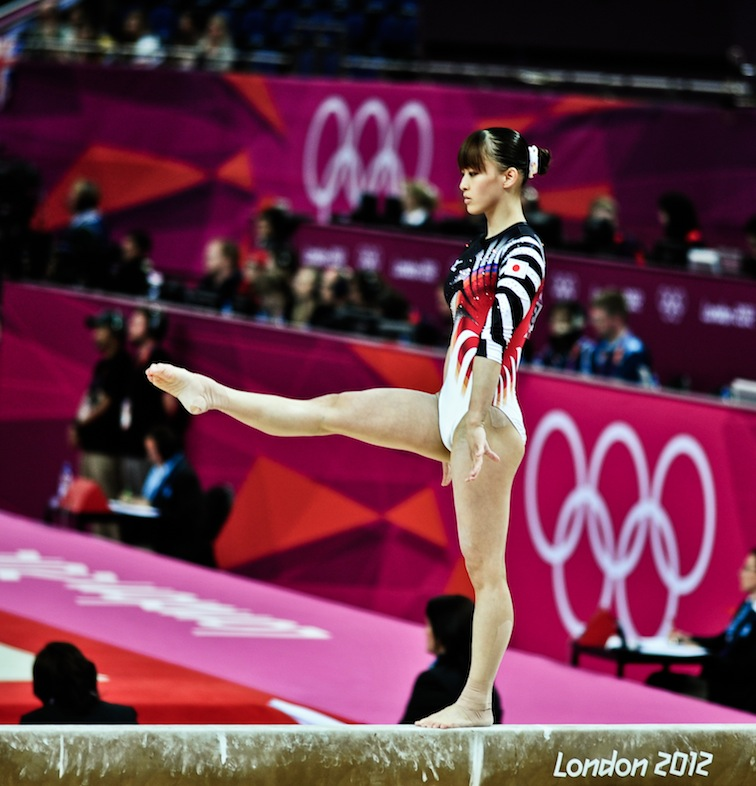
Rie Tankaka performs the balance beam in women's all-around.

Individual finals

Athlete	Event	Apparatus				Total	Rank
Athlete	Event	F	V	UB	BB	Total	Rank
Rie Tanaka	All-around	14.166	14.500	13.700	13.266	55.632	16
Asuka Teramoto	All-around	14.766	14.300	14.300	13.966	57.332	11
Koko Tsurumi	Uneven bars	—N/a	—N/a	14.966	—N/a	14.966	7

=== Rhythmic ===
Athlete	Event	Qualification				Final			
Athlete	Event	5 balls	3 ribbons 2 hoops	Total	Rank	5 balls	3 ribbons 2 hoops	Total	Rank
Natsuki Fukase; Airi Hatakeyama; Rie Matsubara; Rina Miura; Nina Saeed-Yokota; Kotono Tanaka	Team	26.725	26.300	53.025	8 Q	27.000	27.100	54.100	7

=== Trampoline ===
Athlete	Event	Qualification		Final	
Athlete	Event	Score	Rank	Score	Rank
Masaki Ito	Men's	109.810	4 Q	60.895	4
Yasuhiro Ueyama	Men's	109.809	5 Q	60.240	5
Ayano Kishi	Women's	97.985	14	did not advance	

== Judo ==
Men

Athlete	Event	Round of 64	Round of 32	Round of 16	Quarterfinals	Semifinals	Repechage	Final / BM	
Athlete	Event	Opposition Result	Opposition Result	Opposition Result	Opposition Result	Opposition Result	Opposition Result	Opposition Result	Rank
Hiroaki Hiraoka	−60 kg	Bye	McKenzie (GBR); W 0111–0000	Arshanski (ISR); W 0012–0000	Milous (FRA); W 0012–0010	Verde (ITA); W 0110–0001	Bye	Galstyan (RUS); L 0000–1000	2nd place, silver medalist(s)
Masashi Ebinuma	−66 kg	Bye	Mehmedovic (CAN); W 0111–0000	Lim (KAZ); W 0010–0001	Cho J-H (KOR); W 0001–0001	Shavdatuashvili (GEO); L 0000–0100	Bye	Zagrodnik (POL); W 0110–0101	3rd place, bronze medalist(s)
Riki Nakaya	−73 kg	Bye	Maxwell (BAR); W 0100–0001	Palelashvili (ISR); W 0101–0000	Boqiev (TJK); W 0011–0002	Elmont (NED); W 0000–0001	Bye	Isaev (RUS); L 0001–0011	2nd place, silver medalist(s)
Takahiro Nakai	−81 kg	Bye	Munyonga (ZAM); W 1000–0000	Toma (MDA); W 0101–0003	Bischof (GER); L 0000–1010	Did not advance	Guilheiro (BRA); W 0011–0002	Nifontov (RUS); L 0000–0201	5
Masashi Nishiyama	−90 kg	—N/a	Mamedov (KGZ); W 0110–0001	Bolat (KAZ); W 0010–0000	Song D-N (KOR); L 0101–0011	Did not advance	Choriev (UZB); W 0012–0012 YUS	Denisov (RUS); W 0000–0000 YUS	3rd place, bronze medalist(s)
Takamasa Anai	−100 kg	—N/a	Austin (GBR); W 0101–0003	Krpálek (CZE); L 0000–1001	did not advance				
Daiki Kamikawa	+100 kg	—N/a	Castillo (GUA); W 0100–0000	Makarau (BLR); L 0001–0011	did not advance				

Women

Athlete	Event	Round of 32	Round of 16	Quarterfinals	Semifinals	Repechage	Final / BM	
Athlete	Event	Opposition Result	Opposition Result	Opposition Result	Opposition Result	Opposition Result	Opposition Result	Rank
Tomoko Fukumi	−48 kg	Blanco (ESP); W 0100–0001	Edwards (GBR); W 0020–0000	Pareto (ARG); W 0010–0002	Dumitru (ROM); L 0011–0102	Bye	Csernoviczki (HUN); L 0001–1001	5
Misato Nakamura	−52 kg	Bye	An K-a (PRK); L 0002–0102	did not advance				
Kaori Matsumoto	−57 kg	Đukić (SLO); W 0011–0002	Gasimova (AZE); W 0010–0000	Quintavalle (ITA); W 0010–0001	Pavia (FRA); W 0010–0000	Bye	Căprioriu (ROM); W 0100–0000	1st place, gold medalist(s)
Yoshie Ueno	−63 kg	Chaudhary (IND); W 1000–0000	Mišković (CRO); W 0010–0000	Joung D-w (KOR); L 0010–0000	Did not advance	Willeboordse (NED); W 0010–0000	Tsedevsuren (MGL); W 0010–0002	3rd place, bronze medalist(s)
Haruka Tachimoto	−70 kg	Bye	Cortés (CUB); W 0000–0001	Chen F (CHN); L 0020–0020 YUS	Did not advance	Bosch (NED); L 0002–0011	Did not advance	7
Akari Ogata	−78 kg	Jeong G-M (KOR); W 0001–0002	Verkerk (NED); L 0002–0011	did not advance				
Mika Sugimoto	+78 kg	Bye	Blanco (VEN); W 0100–0000	Altheman (BRA); W 0100–0000	Bryant (GBR); W 0011–0002	Bye	Ortiz (CUB); L 0001–0000	2nd place, silver medalist(s)

== Modern pentathlon ==
Based on their results at the 2011 Asian/Oceania Championships three Japanese pentathletes have qualified for London; Shinichi Tomii has earned places in the men's event; Shino Yamanaka and Narumi Kurosu have earned places in the women's event.

Athlete	Event	Fencing (épée one touch)			Swimming (200 m freestyle)			Riding (show jumping)			Combined: shooting/running (10 m air pistol)/(3000 m)			Total points	Final rank
Athlete	Event	Results	Rank	MP points	Time	Rank	MP points	Penalties	Rank	MP points	Time	Rank	MP Points	Total points	Final rank
Shinichi Tomii	Men's	18–17	=11	832	2:01.19	6	1348	112	25	1088	11:19.03	29	2284	5552	22
Narumi Kurosu	Women's	8–27	35	592	2:22.39	28	1092	496	33	704	13:52.94	35	1672	4060	34
Shino Yamanaka	Women's	7–28	36	568	2:30.36	35	996	64	15	1136	11:58.56	8	2128	4828	30

== Rowing ==
Japan has qualified the following boats.

Men

Athlete	Event	Heats		Repechage		Semifinals		Final	
Athlete	Event	Time	Rank	Time	Rank	Time	Rank	Time	Rank
Daisaku Takeda; Kazushige Ura	Lightweight double sculls	6:54.01	5 R	6:39.81	2 SA/B	6:48.61	6 FB	6:48.27	12

Women

Athlete	Event	Heats		Repechage		Quarterfinals		Semifinals		Final	
Athlete	Event	Time	Rank	Time	Rank	Time	Rank	Time	Rank	Time	Rank
Haruna Sakakibara	Single sculls	7:52.98	5 QF	Bye		8:12.26	5 SC/D	8:05.65	5 FD	8:42.90	23
Atsumi Fukumoto; Akiko Iwamoto	Lightweight double sculls	7:30.29	3 R	7:23.79	2 SA/B	—N/a		7:34.23	6 FB	7:32.12	12

Qualification Legend: FA=Final A (medal); FB=Final B (non-medal); FC=Final C (non-medal); FD=Final D (non-medal); FE=Final E (non-medal); FF=Final F (non-medal); SA/B=Semifinals A/B; SC/D=Semifinals C/D; SE/F=Semifinals E/F; QF=Quarterfinals; R=Repechage

== Sailing ==
Japan has qualified 1 boat for each of the following events

Men

Athlete	Event	Race											Net points	Final rank
Athlete	Event	1	2	3	4	5	6	7	8	9	10	M*	Net points	Final rank
Makoto Tomizawa	RS:X	25	25	25	29	24	26	~~34~~	30	21	4	EL	209	28
Ryunosuke Harada; Yugo Yoshida	470	19	12	~~25~~	12	7	11	21	17	17	15	EL	131	18

Women

Athlete	Event	Race											Net points	Final rank
Athlete	Event	1	2	3	4	5	6	7	8	9	10	M*	Net points	Final rank
Yuki Sunaga	RS:X	19	23	22	22	22	~~24~~	22	20	18	12	EL	180	21
Manami Doi	Laser Radial	29	32	31	27	26	~~36~~	30	22	27	29	EL	253	31
Ai Kondo; Wakako Tabata	470	9	4	17	20	11	9	13	~~DSQ~~	13	8	EL	103	14

Open

Athlete	Event	Race																Net points	Final rank
Athlete	Event	1	2	3	4	5	6	7	8	9	10	11	12	13	14	15	M*	Net points	Final rank
Yukio Makino; Kenji Takahashi	49er	16	13	17	14	~~18~~	11	18	16	18	18	14	15	6	2	10	EL	188	18

M = Medal race; EL = Eliminated – did not advance into the medal race;

== Shooting ==
Japan has gained four quota places in the shooting events;

Men

Athlete	Event	Qualification		Final	
Athlete	Event	Points	Rank	Points	Rank
Tomoyuki Matsuda	50 m pistol	559	11	did not advance	
Tomoyuki Matsuda	10 m air pistol	581	13	did not advance	
Midori Yajima	50 m rifle 3 positions	1148	39	did not advance	
Midori Yajima	50 m rifle prone	590	33	did not advance	
Midori Yajima	10 m air rifle	589	38	did not advance	

Women

Athlete	Event	Qualification		Final	
Athlete	Event	Points	Rank	Points	Rank
Yukari Konishi	25 m pistol	574	31	did not advance	
Yukari Konishi	10 m air pistol	377	31	did not advance	
Yukie Nakayama	Trap	65	15	did not advance	

== Swimming ==
Japan sent a total of 29 swimmers at the London games, after having achieved qualifying standards in their respective events (up to a maximum of 2 swimmers in each event at the Olympic Qualifying Time (OQT), and 1 at the Olympic Selection Time (OST)): Excluding the relay events, eight swimmers competed in more than a single event, including the defending champion Kosuke Kitajima from the breaststroke events.

By results, Japan left London with 11 swimming medals (3 silver and 8 bronze), the largest amount received at a single event. Backstroke swimmer Ryosuke Irie, and breaststroke swimmer Satomi Suzuki managed to win three medals in all of their respective events, whether individual or relay. Kosuke Hagino, the youngest male swimmer in the team, surprisingly won the bronze medal in the men's 400 m individual medley, surpassing all-time defending champion Michael Phelps, who finished behind him in the finals. Butterfly swimmer Takeshi Matsuda managed to repeat his bronze medal from Beijing in the men's 200 m butterfly, in addition to his silver from the men's medley relay event. Kitajima, who bid to win double breaststroke swimming events for third Games in succession, missed out of medal standings in the final rounds.

Men

Athlete	Event	Heat		Semifinal		Final	
Athlete	Event	Time	Rank	Time	Rank	Time	Rank
Takuro Fujii	100 m butterfly	52.49	20	did not advance			
Kosuke Hagino	200 m individual medley	1:58.22	3 Q	1:57.95	5 Q	1:57.35	5
Kosuke Hagino	400 m individual medley	4:10.01	1 Q	—N/a		4:08.94 NR	3rd place, bronze medalist(s)
Yasunari Hirai	10 km open water	—N/a				1:51:20.1	15
Yuya Horihata	400 m individual medley	4:13.09	7 Q	—N/a		4:13.30	6
Ryosuke Irie	100 m backstroke	53.56	5 Q	53.29	4 Q	52.97	3rd place, bronze medalist(s)
Ryosuke Irie	200 m backstroke	1:56.81	4 Q	1:55.68	4 Q	1:53.78	2nd place, silver medalist(s)
Kazuya Kaneda	200 m butterfly	1:55.70	7 Q	1:55.56	10	did not advance	
Kosuke Kitajima	100 m breaststroke	59.63	2 Q	59.69	6 Q	59.79	5
Kosuke Kitajima	200 m breaststroke	2:09.43	5 Q	2:09.03	5 Q	2:08.35	4
Takeshi Matsuda	100 m butterfly	52.36	=16 LSO	did not advance			
Takeshi Matsuda	200 m butterfly	1:55.81	8 Q	1:54.25	1 Q	1:53.21	3rd place, bronze medalist(s)
Ken Takakuwa	200 m individual medley	1:58.82	9 Q	1:58.31	6 Q	1:58.53	6
Ryo Tateishi	100 m breaststroke	59.86	8 Q	59.93	10	did not advance	
Ryo Tateishi	200 m breaststroke	2:09.37	4 Q	2:09.13	7 Q	2:08.29	3rd place, bronze medalist(s)
Kazuki Watanabe	200 m backstroke	1:58.17	13 Q	1:56.81	6 Q	1:57.03	6
Kosuke Hagino; Chiaki Ishibashi; Yuki Kobori; Takeshi Matsuda; Sho Sotodate	4 × 200 m freestyle relay	7:11.74	9	—N/a		did not advance	
Takuro Fujii; Ryosuke Irie; Kosuke Kitajima; Takeshi Matsuda	4 × 100 m medley relay	3:33.64	3 Q	—N/a		3:31.26	2nd place, silver medalist(s)

Women

Athlete	Event	Heat		Semifinal		Final	
Athlete	Event	Time	Rank	Time	Rank	Time	Rank
Natsumi Hoshi	100 m butterfly	59.06	23	did not advance			
Natsumi Hoshi	200 m butterfly	2:08.04	6 Q	2:06.37	3 Q	2:05.48	3rd place, bronze medalist(s)
Hanae Ito	200 m freestyle	1:58.93	15 Q	1:59.24	16	did not advance	
Izumi Kato	200 m individual medley	2:13.85	14 Q	2:14.47	14	did not advance	
Yuka Kato	100 m butterfly	58.72	15 Q	58.26	11	did not advance	
Yumi Kida	10 km open water	—N/a				1:58:59.1	13
Yayoi Matsumoto	50 m freestyle	25.73	35	did not advance			
Mina Matsushima	100 m breaststroke	1:07.69	14 Q	1:08.26	16	did not advance	
Miyu Otsuka	200 m backstroke	2:11.65	21	did not advance			
Miyu Otsuka	400 m individual medley	4:39.13	12	—N/a		did not advance	
Satomi Suzuki	100 m breaststroke	1:07.08	6 Q	1:07.10	7 Q	1:06.46	3rd place, bronze medalist(s)
Satomi Suzuki	200 m breaststroke	2:23.22	3 Q	2:22.40	3 Q	2:20.70	2nd place, silver medalist(s)
Miho Takahashi	400 m individual medley	4:45.10	20	—N/a		did not advance	
Aya Takano	400 m freestyle	4:12.33	26	—N/a		did not advance	
Aya Terakawa	100 m backstroke	59.82	4 Q	59.34	3 Q	58.83	3rd place, bronze medalist(s)
Haruka Ueda	100 m freestyle	54.35	12 Q	54.59	16	did not advance	
Kanako Watanabe	200 m breaststroke	2:26.38	12 Q	2:27.32	14	did not advance	
Hanae Ito; Yayoi Matsumoto; Miki Uchida; Haruka Ueda	4 × 100 m freestyle relay	3:38.06	5 Q	—N/a		3:37.96	7
Hanae Ito; Yayoi Matsumoto; Aya Takano; Haruka Ueda	4 × 200 m freestyle relay	7:54.56	8 Q	—N/a		7:56.73	8
Yuka Kato; Satomi Suzuki; Aya Terakawa; Haruka Ueda	4 × 100 m medley relay	3:57.87	2 Q	—N/a		3:55.73	3rd place, bronze medalist(s)

WSO – Win swim-off; LSO – Lost swim-off

== Synchronized swimming ==
Japan has qualified 9 quota places in synchronized swimming.

Athlete	Event	Technical routine		Free routine (preliminary)			Free routine (final)		
Athlete	Event	Points	Rank	Points	Total (technical + free)	Rank	Points	Total (technical + free)	Rank
Yukiko Inui; Chisa Kobayashi	Duet	93.200	5	93.200	186.400	5 Q	93.540	186.740	5
Yumi Adachi; Aika Hakoyama; Yukiko Inui; Mayo Itoyama; Chisa Kobayashi; Risako Mitsui; Mai Nakamura; Mariko Sakai; Kurumi Yoshida	Team	93.800	5	—N/a			93.830	187.630	5

== Table tennis ==
Japan has qualified 3 men and 3 women.

Men

Athlete	Event	Preliminary round	Round 1	Round 2	Round 3	Round 4	Quarterfinals	Semifinals	Final / BM	
Athlete	Event	Opposition Result	Opposition Result	Opposition Result	Opposition Result	Opposition Result	Opposition Result	Opposition Result	Opposition Result	Rank
Seiya Kishikawa	Singles	Bye			Gionis (GRE); W (4–3)	Oh S-e (KOR); W (4–1)	Wang H (CHN); L (0–4)	did not advance		
Jun Mizutani	Singles	Bye			Lashin (EGY); W (4–1)	Maze (DEN); L (0–4)	did not advance			
Seiya Kishikawa; Jun Mizutani; Koki Niwa	Team	—N/a				Canada; W (3–0)	Hong Kong; L (2–3)	did not advance		

Women

Athlete	Event	Preliminary round	Round 1	Round 2	Round 3	Round 4	Quarterfinals	Semifinals	Final / BM	
Athlete	Event	Opposition Result	Opposition Result	Opposition Result	Opposition Result	Opposition Result	Opposition Result	Opposition Result	Opposition Result	Rank
Ai Fukuhara	Singles	Bye			Tikhomirova (RUS); W (4–0)	Li J (NED); W (4–3)	Ding N (CHN); L (0–4)	did not advance		
Kasumi Ishikawa	Singles	Bye			Li Qb (AUT); W (4–2)	Li Q (POL); W (4–1)	Wang Yg (SIN); W (4–1)	Li Xx (CHN); L (1–4)	Feng Tw (SIN); L (0–4)	4
Ai Fukuhara; Sayaka Hirano; Kasumi Ishikawa	Team	—N/a				United States; W (3–0)	Germany; W (3–0)	Singapore; W (3–0)	China; L (0–3)	2nd place, silver medalist(s)

== Taekwondo ==
Japan has qualified the following quotas.

Athlete	Event	Round of 16	Quarterfinals	Semifinals	Repechage	Bronze medal	Final	
Athlete	Event	Opposition Result	Opposition Result	Opposition Result	Opposition Result	Opposition Result	Opposition Result	Rank
Erika Kasahara	Women's −49 kg	Tona (PNG); W 12–0 PTG	Wu Jy (CHN); L 0–14 PTG	Did not advance	Zamora (GUA); L 2–6	did not advance		
Mayu Hamada	Women's −57 kg	Zaninović (CRO); W 14–11	Jones (GBR); L 3–13	Did not advance	Gladović (SRB); W 15–2 PTG	Harnois (FRA); L 8–12	Did not advance	5

== Tennis ==
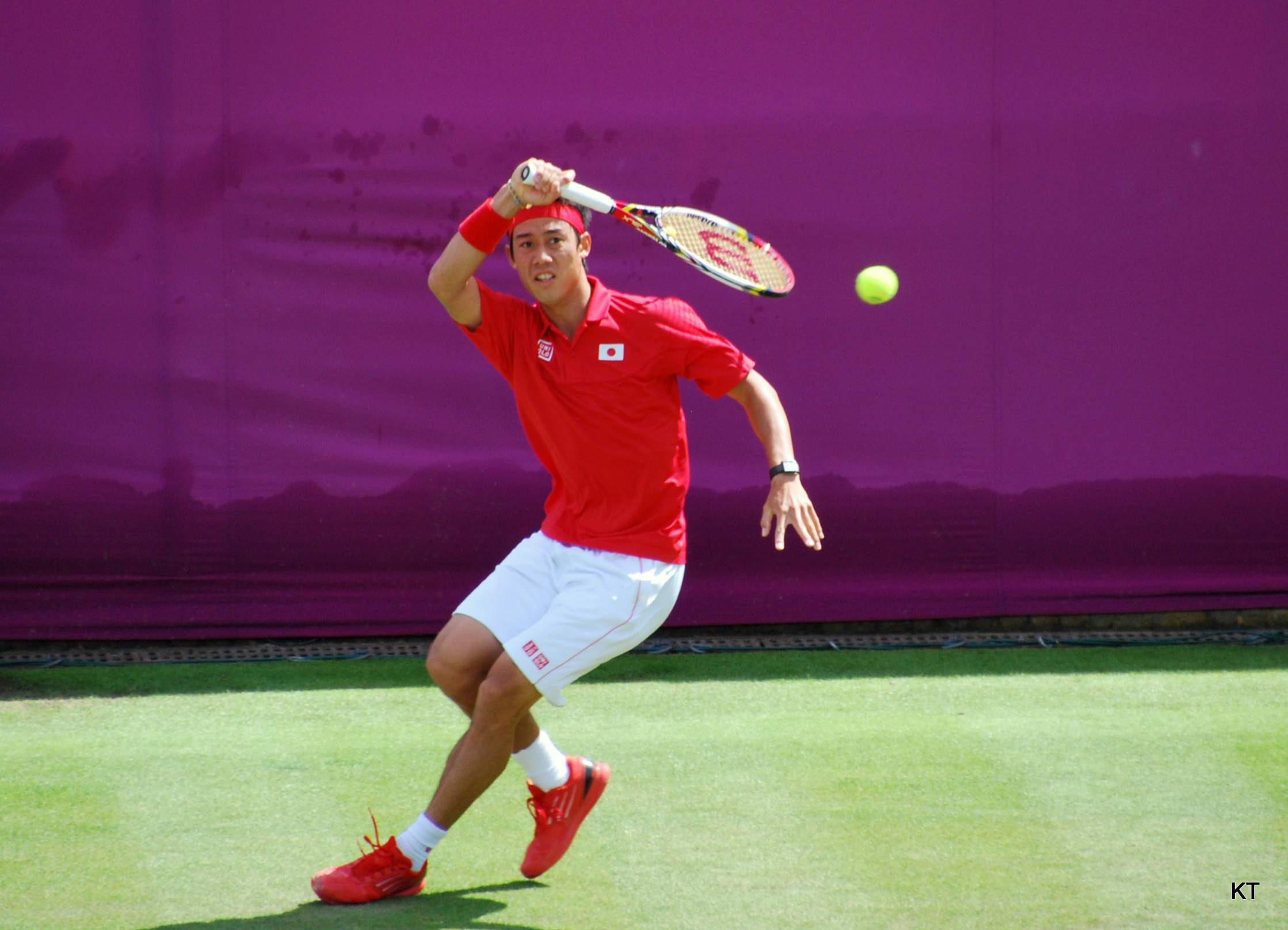
Kei Nishikori in men's tennis singles.

Athlete	Event	Round of 64	Round of 32	Round of 16	Quarterfinals	Semifinals	Final / BM	
Athlete	Event	Opposition Score	Opposition Score	Opposition Score	Opposition Score	Opposition Score	Opposition Score	Rank
Tatsuma Ito	Men's singles	Raonic (CAN); L 3–6, 4–6	did not advance					
Kei Nishikori	Men's singles	Tomic (AUS); W 7–6, 7–6	Davydenko (RUS); W 4–6, 6–4, 6–1	Ferrer (ESP); W 6–0, 3–6, 6–4	del Potro (ARG); L 4–6, 6–7^{(4–7)}	did not advance		
Go Soeda	Men's singles	Baghdatis (CYP); L 7–6^{(8–6)} 6–7^{(5–7)} 2–6	did not advance					
Kei Nishikori; Go Soeda	Men's doubles	—N/a	Federer / Wawrinka (SUI); L 7–6^{(7–5)}, 4–6, 4–6	did not advance				

== Triathlon ==
Japan has qualified 2 men and 3 women.

Athlete	Event	Swim (1.5 km)	Trans 1	Bike (40 km)	Trans 2	Run (10 km)	Total Time	Rank
Yuichi Hosoda	Men's	18:06	0:43	59:37	0:31	32:43	1:51:40	43
Hirokatsu Tayama	Men's	17:24	0:44	58:45	0:34	31:57	1:49:24	20
Mariko Adachi	Women's	18:25	0:44	1:06:29	0:35	35:51	2:02:04	14
Juri Ide	Women's	19:46	0:43	1:06:56	0:35	36:43	2:04:43	34
Ai Ueda	Women's	20:48	0:45	1:09:42	0:31	34:48	2:06:34	39

== Volleyball ==
=== Beach ===
The men's team qualified after winning the AVC Continental Beach Volleyball Cup.

Athlete	Event	Preliminary round	Standing	Round of 16	Quarterfinals	Semifinals	Final / BM	
Athlete	Event	Opposition Score	Standing	Opposition Score	Opposition Score	Opposition Score	Opposition Score	Rank
Kentaro Asahi; Katsuhiro Shiratori	Men's	Pool B Dalhausser – Rogers (USA); L 0 – 2 (15–21, 16–21); Beneš – Kubala (CZE); L 1 – 2 (21–17, 12–21, 7–15); Gavira – Herrera (ESP); L 0 – 2 (19–21, 20–22)	4	did not advance				19

=== Indoor ===
Summary

Team	Event	Group Stage						Quarterfinal	Semifinal	Final / BM	
Team	Event	Opposition Score	Opposition Score	Opposition Score	Opposition Score	Opposition Score	Rank	Opposition Score	Opposition Score	Opposition Score	Rank
Japan women's	Women's tournament	Algeria; W 0–3	Italy; L 3–1	Dominican Republic; W 0–3	Russia; L 1–3	Great Britain; W 0–3	3 Q	China; W 3–2	Brazil; L 3–0	South Korea; W 3–0	3rd place, bronze medalist(s)

==== Women's tournament ====
Japan has qualified a team to the women's indoor tournament through the World Qualification Tournament.

- Women's team event – 1 team of 12 players

Team roster

The following is the Japanese roster in the women's volleyball tournament of the 2012 Summer Olympics.

Head coach: Masayoshi Manabe

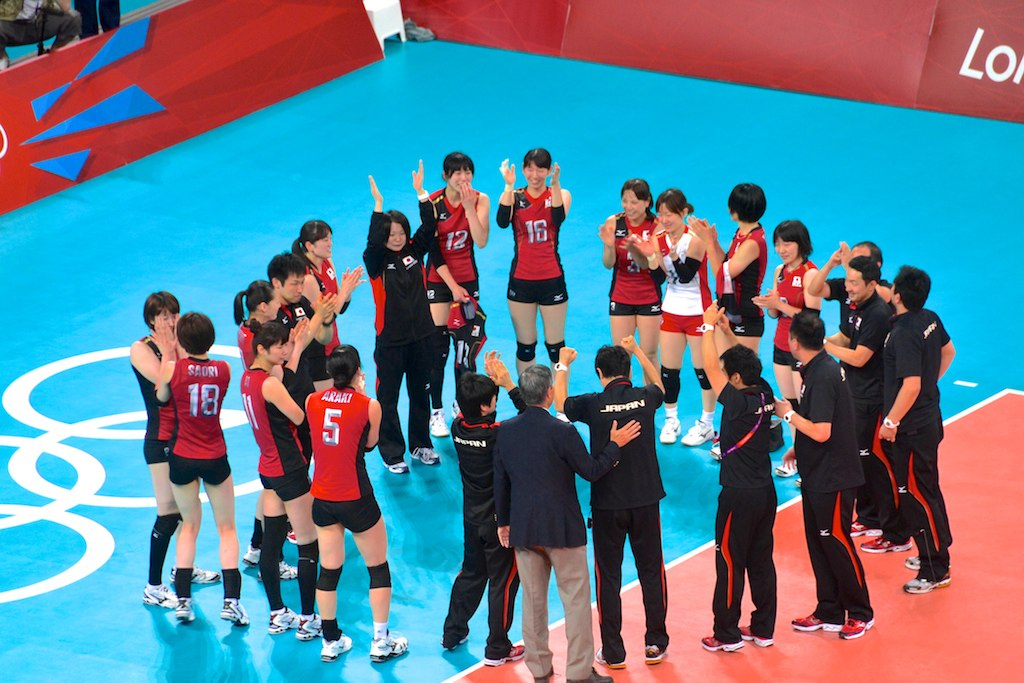
The Japanese team after winning the bronze medal

№	Name	Date of birth	Height	Weight	Spike	Block	2012 club
2	Hitomi Nakamichi	18 September 1985	1.59 m (5 ft 3 in)	53 kg (117 lb)	270 cm (110 in)	256 cm (101 in)	(Japan) Toray Arrows
3	Yoshie Takeshita	18 March 1978	1.59 m (5 ft 3 in)	53 kg (117 lb)	280 cm (110 in)	270 cm (110 in)	(Japan) JT Marvelous
4	Mai Yamaguchi	3 July 1983	1.76 m (5 ft 9 in)	62 kg (137 lb)	302 cm (119 in)	290 cm (110 in)	(Japan) Okayama Seagulls
5	Erika Araki (c)	3 August 1984	1.86 m (6 ft 1 in)	80 kg (180 lb)	308 cm (121 in)	298 cm (117 in)	(Japan) Toray Arrows
7	Kaori Inoue	21 October 1982	1.82 m (6 ft 0 in)	59 kg (130 lb)	306 cm (120 in)	300 cm (120 in)	(Japan) Denso Airybees
8	Maiko Kano	15 July 1988	1.85 m (6 ft 1 in)	72 kg (159 lb)	303 cm (119 in)	285 cm (112 in)	(Turkey) Beşiktaş
10	Yuko Sano (L)	26 July 1979	1.59 m (5 ft 3 in)	63 kg (139 lb)	260 cm (100 in)	250 cm (98 in)	(Azerbaijan) Igtisadchi Baku
11	Ai Ōtomo	24 March 1982	1.84 m (6 ft 0 in)	68 kg (150 lb)	312 cm (123 in)	305 cm (120 in)	(Japan) JT Marvelous
12	Risa Shinnabe	11 July 1990	1.73 m (5 ft 8 in)	66 kg (146 lb)	295 cm (116 in)	268 cm (106 in)	(Japan) Hisamitsu Springs
14	Saori Sakoda	18 December 1987	1.75 m (5 ft 9 in)	64 kg (141 lb)	305 cm (120 in)	279 cm (110 in)	(Japan) Toray Arrows
16	Yukiko Ebata	7 November 1989	1.76 m (5 ft 9 in)	70 kg (150 lb)	305 cm (120 in)	293 cm (115 in)	(Japan) Hitachi Rivale
18	Saori Kimura	19 August 1986	1.85 m (6 ft 1 in)	65 kg (143 lb)	304 cm (120 in)	293 cm (115 in)	(Turkey) VakıfBank Türk Telekom

Group play

Pos	Team	Pld	W	L	Pts	SW	SL	SR	SPW	SPL	SPR	Qualification
1	Russia	5	5	0	14	15	4	3.750	459	352	1.304	Quarter-finals
2	Italy	5	4	1	13	14	5	2.800	442	368	1.201	Quarter-finals
3	Japan	5	3	2	9	11	6	1.833	401	335	1.197	Quarter-finals
4	Dominican Republic	5	2	3	6	8	9	0.889	374	362	1.033	Quarter-finals
5	Great Britain	5	1	4	2	3	14	0.214	295	396	0.745	
6	Algeria	5	0	5	1	2	15	0.133	252	410	0.615	

28 July 2012; 09:30	Algeria	0–3	Japan	Earls Court Exhibition Centre, London; Attendance: 13,000; Referees: Karin Zahorcova (CZE), José Vélez (PUR)
28 July 2012; 09:30	(15–25, 14–25, 7–25) result statistics			Earls Court Exhibition Centre, London; Attendance: 13,000; Referees: Karin Zahorcova (CZE), José Vélez (PUR)

30 July 2012; 20:00	Italy	3–1	Japan	Earls Court Exhibition Centre, London; Attendance: 13,000; Referees: Jose Mercado (PUR), Patricia Salvatore (USA)
30 July 2012; 20:00	(25–22, 25–21, 20–25, 25–22) result statistics			Earls Court Exhibition Centre, London; Attendance: 13,000; Referees: Jose Mercado (PUR), Patricia Salvatore (USA)

1 August 2012; 09:30	Dominican Republic	0–3	Japan	Earls Court Exhibition Centre, London; Attendance: 9,000; Referees: Karin Zahorcova (CZE), Georgios Karampetsos (GRE)
1 August 2012; 09:30	(20–25, 19–25, 23–25) result statistics			Earls Court Exhibition Centre, London; Attendance: 9,000; Referees: Karin Zahorcova (CZE), Georgios Karampetsos (GRE)

3 August 2012; 11:30	Japan	1–3	Russia	Earls Court Exhibition Centre, London; Attendance: 10,000; Referees: Jose Mercado (PUR), Zorica Bjelić (SRB)
3 August 2012; 11:30	(25–27, 17–25, 25–20, 19–25) result statistics			Earls Court Exhibition Centre, London; Attendance: 10,000; Referees: Jose Mercado (PUR), Zorica Bjelić (SRB)

5 August 2012; 14:45	Great Britain	0–3	Japan	Earls Court Exhibition Centre, London; Attendance: 14,000; Referees: Michael Davidson (CAN), Mohamed Shaaban (EGY)
5 August 2012; 14:45	(19–25, 14–25, 12–25) result statistics			Earls Court Exhibition Centre, London; Attendance: 14,000; Referees: Michael Davidson (CAN), Mohamed Shaaban (EGY)

Quarter-final

7 August 2012; 13:00	Japan	3–2	China	Earls Court Exhibition Centre, London; Attendance: 12,000; Referees: Susana Rodriguez (ESP), Zorica Bjelić (SRB)
7 August 2012; 13:00	(28–26, 23–25, 25–23, 23–25, 18–16) result statistics			Earls Court Exhibition Centre, London; Attendance: 12,000; Referees: Susana Rodriguez (ESP), Zorica Bjelić (SRB)

Semi-final

9 August 2012; 19:30	Brazil	3–0	Japan	Earls Court Exhibition Centre, London; Attendance: 13,500; Referees: Simone Santi (ITA), Mohamed Shaaban (EGY)
9 August 2012; 19:30	(25–18, 25–15, 25–18) result statistics			Earls Court Exhibition Centre, London; Attendance: 13,500; Referees: Simone Santi (ITA), Mohamed Shaaban (EGY)

Bronze medal match

11 August 2012; 11:30	(bronze) Japan	3–0	South Korea	Earls Court Exhibition Centre, London; Attendance: 13,500; Referees: Suzana Rodriguez (ESP), Jose Mercado (PUR)
11 August 2012; 11:30	(25–22, 26–24, 25–21) result statistics			Earls Court Exhibition Centre, London; Attendance: 13,500; Referees: Suzana Rodriguez (ESP), Jose Mercado (PUR)

== Weightlifting ==
Japan has qualified 1 man and 4 women.

Athlete	Event	Snatch		Clean & Jerk		Total	Rank
Athlete	Event	Result	Rank	Result	Rank	Total	Rank
Kazuomi Ota	Men's +105 kg	185	13	215	13	400	13
Hiromi Miyake	Women's −48 kg	87	2	110	3	197	2nd place, silver medalist(s)
Honami Mizuochi	Women's −48 kg	80	=6	96	8	176	6
Kanae Yagi	Women's −53 kg	82	13	109	=8	191	13
Mami Shimamoto	Women's +75 kg	110	10	143	8	253	9

== Wrestling ==
Japan has qualified in the following quota places.

Key:

- VT – Victory by Fall.
- PP – Decision by Points – the loser with technical points.
- PO – Decision by Points – the loser without technical points.

Men's freestyle

Athlete	Event	Qualification	Round of 16	Quarterfinal	Semifinal	Repechage 1	Repechage 2	Final / BM	
Athlete	Event	Opposition Result	Opposition Result	Opposition Result	Opposition Result	Opposition Result	Opposition Result	Opposition Result	Rank
Shinichi Yumoto	−55 kg	Bye	Kim J-C (KOR); W 3–1 ^{PP}	Jaburyan (ARM); W 3–0 ^{PO}	Khinchegashvili (GEO); L 1–3 ^{PP}	Bye		Velikov (BUL); W 3–1 ^{PP}	3rd place, bronze medalist(s)
Kenichi Yumoto	−60 kg	Bye	Bonne (CUB); W 3–1 ^{PP}	Asgarov (AZE); L 1–3 ^{PP}	Did not advance	Bye	Schleicher (GER); W 3–1 ^{PP}	Scott (USA); L 1–3 ^{PP}	5
Tatsuhiro Yonemitsu	−66 kg	Bye	López (CUB); W 3–1 ^{PP}	Garcia (CAN); W 3–1 ^{PP}	Hasanov (AZE); W 3–0 ^{PO}	Bye		Kumar (IND); W 3–0 ^{PO}	1st place, gold medalist(s)
Sohsuke Takatani	−74 kg	Aliyev (AZE); L 0–3 ^{PO}	did not advance						16
Takao Isokawa	−96 kg	Tuamoheloa (ASA); W 5–0 ^{VB}	Musaev (KGZ); L 1–3 ^{PP}	did not advance					8

Men's Greco-Roman

Athlete	Event	Qualification	Round of 16	Quarterfinal	Semifinal	Repechage 1	Repechage 2	Final / BM	
Athlete	Event	Opposition Result	Opposition Result	Opposition Result	Opposition Result	Opposition Result	Opposition Result	Opposition Result	Rank
Kohei Hasegawa	−55 kg	Bye	Tazhyieu (BLR); W 3–0 ^{PO}	Nyblom (DEN); L 0–3 ^{PO}	did not advance				10
Ryutaro Matsumoto	−60 kg	Bye	Bilici (TUR); W 3–0 ^{PO}	Belmadani (FRA); W 3–0 ^{PO}	Norouzi (IRI); L 1–3 ^{PP}	Bye		Kebispayev (KAZ); W 5–0 ^{VT}	3rd place, bronze medalist(s)
Tsutomu Fujimura	−66 kg	Bye	Lester (USA); L 0–3 ^{PO}	did not advance					13
Norikatsu Saikawa	−96 kg	Bye	Lidberg (SWE); L 0–3 ^{PO}	did not advance					17

Women's freestyle

Athlete	Event	Qualification	Round of 16	Quarterfinal	Semifinal	Repechage 1	Repechage 2	Final / BM	
Athlete	Event	Opposition Result	Opposition Result	Opposition Result	Opposition Result	Opposition Result	Opposition Result	Opposition Result	Rank
Hitomi Obara	−48 kg	Bye	Mezien (TUN); W 5–0 ^{VT}	Sambou (SEN); W 3–0 ^{PO}	Huynh (CAN); W 3–0 ^{PO}	Bye		Stadnik (AZE); W 3–1 ^{PP}	1st place, gold medalist(s)
Saori Yoshida	−55 kg	Bye	Campbell (USA); W 3–0 ^{PO}	Ratkevich (AZE); W 3–0 ^{PO}	Zholobova (RUS); W 3-0 ^{PO}	Bye		Verbeek (CAN); W 3-0 ^{PO}	1st place, gold medalist(s)
Kaori Icho	−63 kg	Bye	Dugrenier (CAN); W 3–0 ^{PO}	Johansson (SWE); W 3–0 ^{PO}	Battsetseg (MGL); W 3–0 ^{PO}	Bye		Jing Rx (CHN); W 3–0 ^{PO}	1st place, gold medalist(s)
Kyoko Hamaguchi	−72 kg	Bye	Manyurova (KAZ); L 1–3 ^{PP}	did not advance					11

== See also ==
- Japan at the Olympics
- Japan at the 2012 Summer Paralympics
