= Rie Matsubara =

Japanese rhythmic gymnast

- Born: 21 October 1993 (age 32) Gifu, Japan
- Height: 167 cm (5 ft 6 in)

Gymnastics career
- Discipline: Rhythmic gymnastics
- Country represented: Japan; (2010-2021)
Medal record
Group Rhythmic Gymnastics
Representing Japan
World Championships
Gold medal – first place	2019 Baku	5 Balls
Silver medal – second place	2017 Pesaro	3 Ropes + 2 Balls
Silver medal – second place	2018 Sofia	5 Hoops
Silver medal – second place	2019 Baku	Group All-around
Silver medal – second place	2019 Baku	3 Hoops + 4 Clubs
Bronze medal – third place	2015 Suttgart	5 Ribbons
Bronze medal – third place	2017 Pesaro	All-around
Bronze medal – third place	2017 Pesaro	5 Hoops
Bronze medal – third place	2021 Kitakyushu	5 Balls
Bronze medal – third place	2021 Kitakyushu	3 Hoops + 4 Clubs
Asian Championships
Gold medal – first place	2013 Tashkent	10 Clubs
Gold medal – first place	2015 Jecheon	3 Clubs + 2 Hoops
Gold medal – first place	2016 Tashkent	Group All-around
Gold medal – first place	2016 Tashkent	3 Clubs + 2 Hoops
Gold medal – first place	2017 Astana	Group All-around
Gold medal – first place	2017 Astana	5 Hoops
Gold medal – first place	2017 Astana	3 Balls + 2 Ropes
Gold medal – first place	2018 Kuala Lumpur	Group All-around
Gold medal – first place	2018 Kuala Lumpur	5 Hoops
Gold medal – first place	2019 Pattaya	Group All-Around
Silver medal – second place	2013 Tashkent	Group All-around
Silver medal – second place	2013 Tashkent	3 Balls + 2 Ribbons
Silver medal – second place	2015 Jecheon	Group All-around
Silver medal – second place	2015 Jecheon	5 Ribbons
Silver medal – second place	2016 Tashkent	5 Ribbons
Silver medal – second place	2018 Kuala Lumpur	3 Balls + 2 Ropes
Silver medal – second place	2019 Pattaya	5 Balls
Bronze medal – third place	2019 Pattaya	3 Hoops + 4 Clubs

Rie Matsubara (松原 梨恵, Matsubara Rie; born 21 October 1993) is a Japanese former group rhythmic gymnast. She is a World champion and a 10-time Asian champion. She is also a three-time Olympian (2012, 2016, 2020).

== Gymnaastics career ==
Matsubara began rhythmic gymnastics at the age of three after seeing it on television.

=== 2010–2012 ===
Matsubara competed at her first World Championships in 2010 and finished sixth with the group in the all-around and in both apparatus finals. Then at the 2011 World Championships, they finished fifth in the group all-around. She then represented Japan at the 2012 Summer Olympics alongside Natsuki Fukase, Airi Hatakeyama, Rina Miura, Nina Saeedyokota, and Kotono Tanaka, and they finished seventh in the group all-around final.

=== 2013–2015 ===
At the 2013 Asian Championships, Matsubara helped Japan win a silver medal in the group all-around, behind China. The group then won the gold medal in the 10 clubs final and the silver medal in the 3 balls and 2 ribbons final. At the 2013 World Championships, the group finished eighth in the group all-around, eighth in 10 clubs final, and seventh in 3 balls and 2 ribbons final. At the 2014 World Championships, they once again finished eighth in the all-around. She helped Japan win the bronze medal in the 5 ribbons final at the 2015 World Championships, which was Japan's first Rhythmic Gymnastics World Championships medal in 40 years.

=== 2016–2017 ===
Matsubara competed alongside her teammates Airi Hatakeyama, Sakura Noshitani, Sayuri Sugimoto and Kiko Yokota at the 2016 Summer Olympics in Rio de Janeiro, finishing outside of medals in the group all-around final with an eight-place score of 34.200. She competed at the 2017 World Championships and helped Japan win the group all-around bronze medal, behind Russia and Bulgaria. They won another bronze medal in the 5 hoops final and then won the silver medal in the 3 balls and 2 ropes final.

=== 2018–2019 ===
Matsubara helped Japan win the group all-around bronze medal and the gold medal in the 3 balls and 2 ropes final at the 2018 Minsk World Challenge Cup. Then at the Kazan World Challenge Cup, they won the bronze medal in the 3 balls and 2 ropes final. At the 2018 World Championships, they won the silver medal in the 5 balls final behind Bulgaria and finished fifth in the all-around.

Matsubara helped Japan win the group all-around title ahead of the reigning World champions at the 2019 Baku World Cup. They also won a silver medal in the 5 balls final. On September 16–22, she and her teammates competed at the 2019 World Championships. They won silver medal in Group All-around, which matched Japan's best-ever group all-around result from 1975. They then won the gold medal in the 5 balls final– Japan's first ever gold medal in group event at World Rhythmic Gymnastics Championships. They also won the silver medal in the 3 hoops and 4 clubs final.

=== 2020–2021 ===
Matsubara fractured the fifth metatarsal in her left foot while training in January 2020 and missed two months of training.

Matsubara represented Japan at the 2020 Summer Olympics alongside Sayuri Sugimoto, Sakura Noshitani, Ayuka Suzuki, and Nanami Takenaka. They advanced into the group all-around final and finished eighth after major mistakes in their 3 hoops and 4 clubs routine. After the Olympic Games, she competed at the 2021 World Championships, where Japan won bronze medals in both event finals and placed fourth in the all-around.
