= Natsuki Fukase =

Japanese rhythmic gymnast (born 1994)

- Born: 10 April 1994 (age 32) Akita, Japan
- Height: 168 cm (5 ft 6 in)

Gymnastics career
- Discipline: Rhythmic gymnastics
- Country represented: Japan; (2009-2012)

Natsuki Fukase (深瀬 菜月, Fukase Natsuki; 10 April 1994) is a Japanese former group rhythmic gymnast who was part of the national team from 2009 until an injury in 2013. She competed at the 2012 Summer Olympics and the 2010 World Championships, where Japan placed seventh and sixth, respectively, in the group all-around.

== Gymnastics career ==
Fukase began rhythmic gymnastics when she was six years old. At the 2009 All-Japan Junior Championships, she won the bronze medal in the individual all-around, and she placed 18th at the senior All-Japan Championships. She was then selected for the national group in December 2009. She replaced Yuka Endo, who left the group due to injury. She competed at her first World Championships in 2010 in Moscow, where Japan finished sixth in the group all-around. The group also finished sixth in both the 5 hoops and the 3 ribbons and 2 ropes apparatus finals.

Fukase was selected to represent Japan at the 2012 Summer Olympics alongside Airi Hatakeyama, Rie Matsubara, Rina Miura, Nina Saeedyokota, and Kotono Tanaka. They qualified in eighth place and went on to finish seventh in the group all-around final.

Fukase had surgery on her leg in March 2013 and relearned how to walk. After two years of rehabilitation, she began competing again for the Japan Women's College of Physical Education rhythmic gymnastics team and helped them win a national team title. She continued to compete domestically but did not rejoin the national group.

== Personal life ==
Fukase was born with asthma. She dated handball player Daisuke Miyazaki, while Miyazaki was married. In 2020, Miyazaki was arrested on charges of assaulting Fukase, but he was not indicted after both denied the claims of assault.
