= Airi Hatakeyama =

Japanese rhythmic gymnast

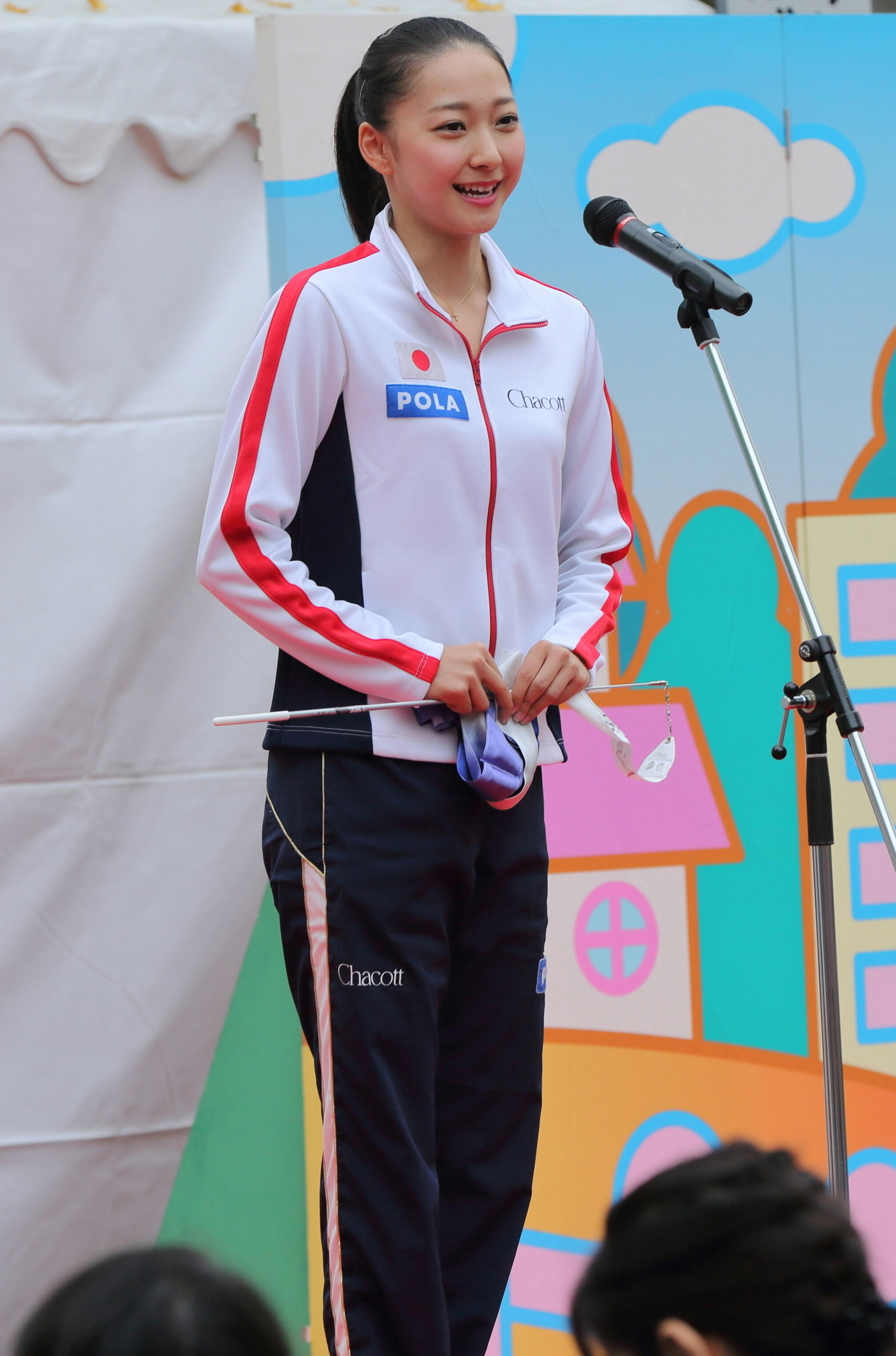
- Hatakeyama in 2014

Personal information
- Born: 16 August 1994 (age 32) Tama, Tokyo, Japan
- Height: 170 cm (5 ft 7 in)

Gymnastics career
- Discipline: Rhythmic gymnastics
- Country represented: Japan; (2009–2016)
- Club: Tokyo Junior Club
Medal record
Representing Japan
Group Rhythmic Gymnastics
World Championships
Bronze medal – third place	2015 Stuttgart	5 Ribbons
Asian Championships
Gold medal – first place	2013 Tashkent	10 clubs
Silver medal – second place	2013 Tashkent	Group all-around
Silver medal – second place	2013 Tashkent	3 balls + 2 ribbons

Airi Hatakeyama (畠山 愛理, Hatakeyama Airi; born 16 August 1994) is a former group rhythmic gymnast and current television reporter in Japan. She competed at the 2012 and 2016 Summer Olympics and won a bronze medal at the 2015 World Championships.

== Gymnastics career ==
Hatakeyama began rhythmic gymnastics when she was six years old and joined the national team in 2009. She competed at her first World Championships in 2010, helping Japan finish sixth in the group all-around. They also placed sixth in both group apparatus finals. Then at the 2011 World Championships, she competed with the group that finished fifth in the group all-around. She then represented Japan at the 2012 Summer Olympics alongside Natsuki Fukase, Rie Matsubara, Rina Miura, Nina Saeedyokota, and Kotono Tanaka, and they finished seventh in the group all-around final.

At the 2013 Asian Championships, Hatakeyama helped Japan win a silver medal in the group all-around, behind China. The group then won the gold medal in the 10 clubs final and another silver medal in the 3 balls and 2 ribbons final. At the 2013 World Championships, the group finished eighth in the group all-around, eighth in 10 clubs final, and seventh in 3 balls and 2 ribbons final. At the 2014 World Championships, they once again finished eighth in the all-around. Hatakeyama was part of the group that won the bronze medal in the 5 ribbons final at the 2015 World Championships, which was Japan's first Rhythmic Gymnastics World Championships medal in 40 years.

Hatakeyama was selected to represent Japan at the 2016 Summer Olympics alongside Sakura Noshitani, Rie Matsubara, Sayuri Sugimoto, and Kiko Yokota. They qualified for the group all-around final and finished in eighth place.

== Post-gymnastics career ==
Since her retirement after the 2016 Summer Olympics, Hatakeyama has promoted products and brands, appeared on variety and comedy television programs, and reported on sports for NHK's "Sunday Sports 2020" show. In 2018, she performed a modern dance to accompany enka singer Midori Oka during the 69th NHK Kōhaku Uta Gassen.

== Personal life ==
Hatakeyama married baseball star Seiya Suzuki on 7 December 2019. She is a fan of Taylor Swift.
