= Zenjirō =

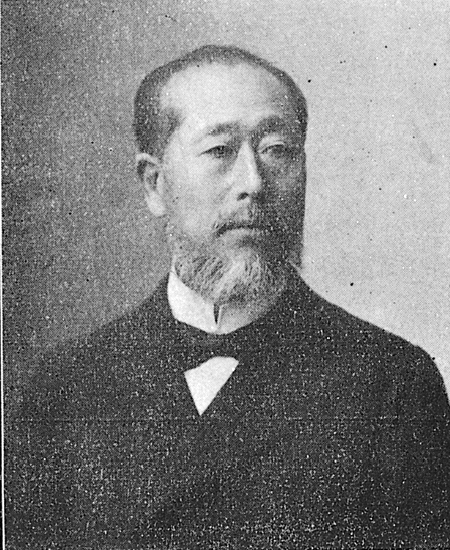
- Zenjiro Yasuda (1838–1921), Japanese entrepreneur
- Pronunciation: dzeNdʑiɾoɯ (IPA)
- Gender: Male

Origin
- Origin: Japanese
- Meaning: Different meanings depending on the kanji used

Other names
- Alternative spelling: Zenziro (Kunrei-shiki) Zenziro (Nihon-shiki) Zenjirō, Zenjiro, Zenjirou (Hepburn)

Zenjirō, Zenjiro or Zenjirou is a masculine Japanese given name.

== Written forms ==
Zenjirō can be written using different combinations of kanji characters. Some examples:

The characters used for "jiro" (二郎 or 次郎) literally means "second son" and usually used as a suffix to a masculine name, especially for the second child. The "zen" part of the name can use a variety of characters, each of which will change the meaning of the name ("善" for virtuous, "全" for all, "然" and so on).

- 善二郎, "virtuous, second son"
- 善次郎, "virtuous, second son"
- 全二郎, "all, second son"
- 全次郎, "all, second son"

Other combinations...

- 善治郎, "virtuous, to manage/cure, son"
- 善次朗, "virtuous, next, clear"
- 全治郎, "all, to manage/cure, son"
- 全次朗, "all, next, clear"
- 然次朗, "so, next, clear"

The name can also be written in hiragana ぜんじろう or katakana ゼンジロウ.

== Notable people with the name ==
- Zenjirō Horikiri (堀切 善次郎; 1884–1979), Japanese politician, and cabinet minister
- Zenjiro Kaneko (金子 善次郎; born 1943), Japanese politician
- Zenjiro Watanabe (渡辺 善次郎; 1914–?), Japanese figure skater
- Zenjiro Yasuda (安田 善次郎; 1838–1921), Japanese entrepreneur
- Zenjiro Yasuda (field hockey) (安田 善治郎; born 1946), Japanese field hockey coach

== Fictional characters ==
- Zenjiro, a character in the manga series Kodocha
- Zenjiro Tsurugi (剣 ゼンジロウ), a character in the anime series Digimon Xros Wars
