= Rina Miura =

Japanese rhythmic gymnast

- 三浦莉奈
- Born: 9 May 1994 (age 32) Tokyo

Gymnastics career
- Discipline: Rhythmic gymnastics
- Country represented: Japan; (2009-2015)
- Retired: yes
Medal record
Group Rhythmic Gymnastics
Representing Japan
Summer Universiade
Silver medal – second place	2013 Kazan	10 Clubs
Silver medal – second place	2013 Kazan	2 Ribbon + 3 Balls
Silver medal – second place	2015 Gwangju	6 Clubs + 2 Hoops
Bronze medal – third place	2013 Kazan	Group All-around

Rina Miura (Japanese: 三浦莉奈; born 9 May 1994) is a Japanese retired rhythmic gymnast. She represented her country in international competitions.

== Career ==
Rina took up rhythmic gymnastics at age 5. In 2009 she entered the national team, early that year she won three bronze medals at Miss Valentine in Tartu. The following year she got bronze in the All-Around in the same tournament.

In 2011 she won bronze, again at Miss Valentine, in the 3 ribbons & 2 hoops' final. In late February the group won bronze at the Grand Prix in Moscow. At the World Cup in Pesaro Rina and her teammates were 8th in the All-Around. She then competed in the Grand Prix in Thiais, finishing in 7th place. In September she was selected for the World Championships in Montpellier, where the group took 6th place in the All-Around, thus qualifying for the Olympic Games, they also achieved 5th place with 5 balls and 7th place with 3 ribbons & 2 hoops.

She started the Olympic year in February by winning all the silver medals at the Moscow Grand Prix. In August she was the reserve for the Japanese group made of Natsuki Fukase, Airi Hatakeyama, Rie Matsubara, Nina Saeedyokota and Kotono Tanaka for the 2012 Olympic Games. In London they achieved 8th place in the qualification round, in the final they took 7th place.

In 2013 Miura was part of the group that competed in the Summer Universiade in Kazan, along Yukari Hatano, Erika Koga, Naomi Kumazawa, Ayano Sato and Ayumi Yusa she won bronze in the All-Around and silver in the two event finals. Two years later she participated in the 2015 Summer Universiade in Gwangju, winning silver in the 6 clubs & 2 hoops' final together with Asuka Ono, Ayano Sato, Konatsu Arai, Mana Tsutsumi and Minori Shindo.
