= Kotono Tanaka =

Japanese rhythmic gymnast

- Born: 18 August 1991 (age 35) Beppu, Oita, Japan
- Height: 166 cm (5 ft 5 in)

Gymnastics career
- Discipline: Rhythmic gymnastics
- Country represented: Japan; (2007–2012)

Kotono Tanaka (田中 琴乃, Tanaka Kotono; born 18 August 1991) is a Japanese former group rhythmic gymnast. She competed at the 2008 and captained the national group at the 2012 Summer Olympics. She also competed at the 2007, 2009, 2010, and 2011 World Championships.

== Gymnastics career ==
Tanaka started rhythmic gymnastics when she was five years old. She was invited to join Japan's national rhythmic gymnastics group in December 2006, and she moved from Ōita Prefecture to Tokyo to join the team. She competed at her first World Championships in 2007 as the youngest member of Japan's group. The group finished seventh in the group all-around and qualified for the 2008 Summer Olympics.

Tanaka was selected to represent Japan at the 2008 Summer Olympics alongside Yuka Endo, Chihana Hara, Saori Inagaki, Nachi Misawa, and Honami Tsuboi. The group finished tenth in the qualification round and did not advance to the final. At the 2009 World Championships, she competed with the group that finished eighth in the all-around. Additionally, they advanced into the 3 ribbons and 2 ropes final, finishing fourth.

Tanaka remained on Japan's national group after new members were selected before the 2010 season. At the 2010 World Championships, she helped Japan finish sixth in the group all-around. Additionally, the group placed sixth in both group apparatus finals. She then competed at the 2011 World Championships with the group that finished fifth in the group all-around.

Tanaka was selected to be the team captain for Japan's group at the 2012 Summer Olympics. She competed alongside Natsuki Fukase, Airi Hatakeyama, Rie Matsubara, Rina Miura, and Nina Saeedyokota. They qualified in eighth place and went on to finish seventh in the group all-around final.

As of March 2025, Tanaka works as a rhythmic gymnastics coach.
