= Rob Bale =

English swimmer

Personal information
- Full name: Robert William Bale
- Nickname: "Rob"
- National team: Great Britain
- Born: 19 July 1990 (age 35) Manchester, England
- Height: 1.74 m (5 ft 9 in)
- Weight: 69 kg (152 lb; 10.9 st)

Sport
- Sport: Swimming
- Strokes: Freestyle
- Club: University of Stirling

Robert William Bale (born 19 July 1990) is an English swimmer who represented Great Britain at the 2012 Summer Olympics.

Bale was born in Manchester, and raised in Lancaster, Lancashire. He attended Ripley St Thomas School and first swam with the Carnforth and District Swimming Club (Carnforth Otters).

He made his first world championship team for the 2009 FINA World Championships in Rome, competing in the 4x200-metre freestyle relay final as Great Britain finished seventh. At the 2012 Summer Olympics in London, he was a member of the British men's team that finished sixth in the 4×200-metre freestyle relay.
