= Swimming at the 2012 Summer Olympics – Men's 4 × 200 metre freestyle relay =

Men's 4 × 200 metre freestyle relay at the Games of the XXX Olympiad
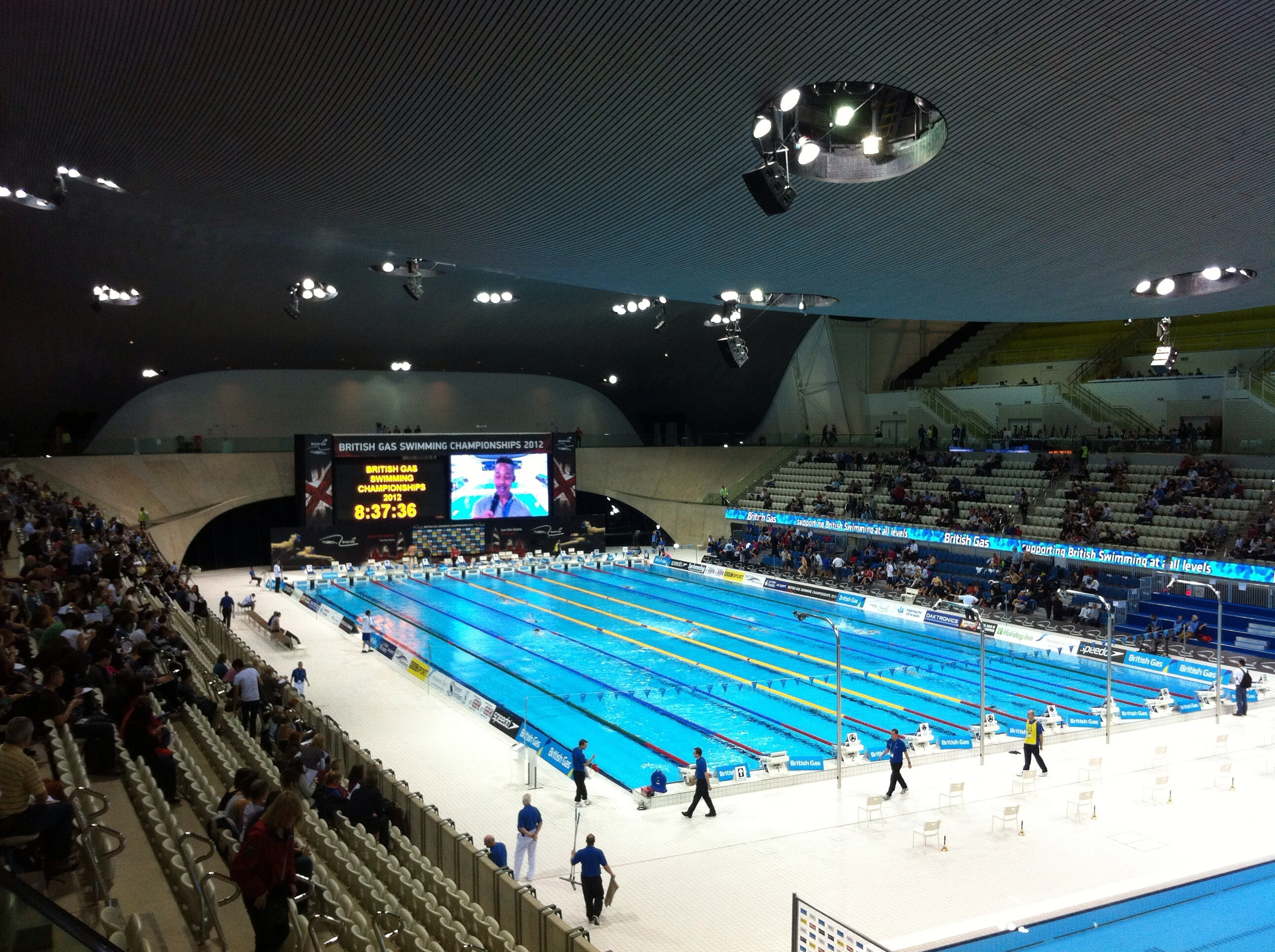
- Aquatics centre during the British Championships in March 2012.
- Venue: London Aquatics Centre
- Dates: July 31, 2012 (heats & final)
- Competitors: 84 from 16 nations
- Teams: 16
- Winning time: 6:59.70

Medalists
1st place, gold medalist(s)		Ryan Lochte, Conor Dwyer, Ricky Berens, Michael Phelps, Charlie Houchin*, Matt McLean*, Davis Tarwater*	United States
2nd place, silver medalist(s)		Amaury Leveaux, Grégory Mallet, Clément Lefert, Yannick Agnel, Jérémy Stravius*	France
3rd place, bronze medalist(s)		Hao Yun, Li Yunqi, Jiang Haiqi, Sun Yang, Lü Zhiwu*, Dai Jun*; *Indicates the swimmer only competed in the preliminary heats.	China

The men's 4 × 200 metre freestyle relay event at the 2012 Summer Olympics took place on 31 July at the London Aquatics Centre in London, United Kingdom.

The U.S. men's team smashed the seven-minute barrier in textile to defend the Olympic title in the event, and most importantly, to keep Michael Phelps' all-time record alive. The American foursome of Ryan Lochte (1:45.15), Conor Dwyer (1:45.23), Ricky Berens (1:45.27), and Phelps (1:44.05) dominated the race from the start to put together a blazing fast finish in 6:59.70. As the Americans defended their Olympic title, Phelps also surpassed Soviet gymnast Larisa Latynina to become the most decorated Olympic athlete of all time with a remarkable career tally of nineteen medals (15 golds, 2 silver, and 2 bronze).

France's Amaury Leveaux (1:46.70), Grégory Mallet (1:46.83), Clément Lefert (1:46.00), and Yannick Agnel (1:43.24, the fastest split in the field) trailed behind their newest rivals in the pool by a couple of seconds to take home the silver in 7:02.77. Meanwhile, China's Hao Yun (1:47.12), Li Yunqi (1:46.46), and Jiang Haiqi (1:47.17) struggled to keep their momentum throughout the race before Sun Yang dove into the pool at the final exchange. Sun then produced an astonishing anchor of 1:45.55 to deliver the Chinese team a historic relay bronze medal in 7:06.30, holding off the aggressive German foursome of Paul Biedermann (1:46.15), Dimitri Colupaev (1:46.36), Tim Wallburger (1:47.48), and Clemens Rapp (1:46.60) by 29-hundredths of a second with a fourth-place finish (7:06.59).

Australia's Thomas Fraser-Holmes (1:46.13), Kenrick Monk (1:46.67), Ned McKendry (1:47.60), and Ryan Napoleon (1:46.60) finished fifth in 7:07.00, while Great Britain (7:09.33), South Africa (7:09.65), and Hungary (7:13.66) also vied for an Olympic medal to round out a historic finish.

== Records ==
Prior to this competition, the existing world and Olympic records were as follows.

World record	United States (USA); Michael Phelps (1:44.49); Ricky Berens (1:44.13); David Walters (1:45.47); Ryan Lochte (1:44.46)	6:58.55	Rome, Italy	31 July 2009
Olympic record	United States; Michael Phelps (1:43.31); Ryan Lochte (1:44.28); Ricky Berens (1:46.29); Peter Vanderkaay (1:44.68)	6:58.56	Beijing, China	13 August 2008

== Results ==
=== Heats ===
Rank	Heat	Lane	Nation	Swimmers	Time	Notes
1	2	4	United States	Charlie Houchin (1:48.22); Matt McLean (1:46.68); Davis Tarwater (1:46.33); Conor Dwyer (1:45.52)	7:06.75	Q
2	1	4	France	Jérémy Stravius (1:47.42); Grégory Mallet (1:47.56); Amaury Leveaux (1:47.87); Clément Lefert (1:46.33)	7:09.18	Q
3	1	5	Germany	Tim Wallburger (1:48.10); Dimitri Colupaev (1:47.47); Clemens Rapp (1:48.04); Paul Biedermann (1:45.62)	7:09.23	Q
4	2	3	Australia	David McKeon (1:48.25); Cameron McEvoy (1:47.89); Ned McKendry (1:47.55); Ryan Napoleon (1:46.81)	7:10.50	Q
5	2	6	Great Britain	David Carry (1:48.82); Ross Davenport (1:47.59); Rob Bale (1:47.85); Robbie Renwick (1:46.44)	7:10.70	Q
6	2	5	China	Lü Zhiwu (1:48.83); Li Yunqi (1:47.27); Jiang Haiqi (1:47.56); Dai Jun (1:47.69)	7:11.35	Q
7	1	8	South Africa	Darian Townsend (1:48.09); Jean Basson (1:48.12); Sebastien Rousseau (1:47.67); Chad le Clos (1:47.63)	7:11.51	Q
8	1	2	Hungary	Dominik Kozma (1:47.24); Péter Bernek (1:48.94); László Cseh (1:48.19); Gergő Kis (1:47.27)	7:11.64	Q
9	1	3	Japan	Yuki Kobori (1:48.00); Sho Sotodate (1:47.30); Chiaki Ishibashi (1:48.38); Yuya Horihata (1:48.06)	7:11.74	
10	2	1	Russia	Artem Lobuzov (1:48.30); Yevgeny Lagunov (1:47.40); Mikhail Polishchuk (1:48.82); Alexander Sukhorukov (1:47.34)	7:11.86	
11	1	6	Italy	Gianluca Maglia (1:48.39); Alex Di Giorgio (1:47.83); Riccardo Maestri (1:47.94); Marco Belotti (1:48.53)	7:12.69	
12	2	8	Belgium	Dieter Dekoninck (1:48.62); Glenn Surgeloose (1:48.22); Louis Croenen (1:49.32); Pieter Timmers (1:48.28)	7:14.44	NR
13	1	1	Denmark	Daniel Skaaning (1:48.98); Pál Joensen (1:49.40); Anders Lie (1:47.59); Mads Glæsner (1:49.07)	7:15.04	NR
14	2	7	Canada	Blake Worsley (1:48.23); Colin Russell (1:48.54); Tobias Oriwol (1:49.24); Alec Page (1:49.21)	7:15.22	
15	1	7	New Zealand	Matthew Stanley (1:47.88); Steven Kent (1:49.92); Dylan Dunlop-Barrett (1:49.51); Andrew McMillan (1:49.87)	7:17.18	
16	2	2	Austria	David Brandl (1:49.80); Christian Scherübl (1:48.64); Markus Rogan (1:48.13); Florian Janistyn (1:51.37)	7:17.94	

=== Final ===
Rank	Lane	Nation	Swimmers	Time	Time behind	Notes
1st place, gold medalist(s)	4	United States	Ryan Lochte (1:45.15); Conor Dwyer (1:45.23); Ricky Berens (1:45.27); Michael Phelps (1:44.05)	6:59.70		
2nd place, silver medalist(s)	5	France	Amaury Leveaux (1:46.70); Grégory Mallet (1:46.83); Clément Lefert (1:46.00); Yannick Agnel (1:43.24)	7:02.77	3.07	NR
3rd place, bronze medalist(s)	7	China	Hao Yun (1:47.12); Li Yunqi (1:46.46); Jiang Haiqi (1:47.17); Sun Yang (1:45.55)	7:06.30	6.60	
4	3	Germany	Paul Biedermann (1:46.15); Dimitri Colupaev (1:46.36); Tim Wallburger (1:47.48); Clemens Rapp (1:46.60)	7:06.59	6.89	
5	6	Australia	Thomas Fraser-Holmes (1:46.13); Kenrick Monk (1:46.67); Ned McKendry (1:47.60); Ryan Napoleon (1:46.60)	7:07.00	7.30	
6	2	Great Britain	Robbie Renwick (1:46.93); Ieuan Lloyd (1:47.40); Rob Bale (1:47.45); Ross Davenport (1:47.55)	7:09.33	9.63	
7	1	South Africa	Darian Townsend (1:47.25); Sebastien Rousseau (1:47.36); Chad le Clos (1:47.15); Jean Basson (1:47.89)	7:09.65	9.95	
8	8	Hungary	Dominik Kozma (1:46.94); László Cseh (1:48.06); Péter Bernek (1:48.74); Gergő Kis (1:49.92)	7:13.66	13.96	
