= Kaori Inoue =

Japanese volleyball player (born 1982)

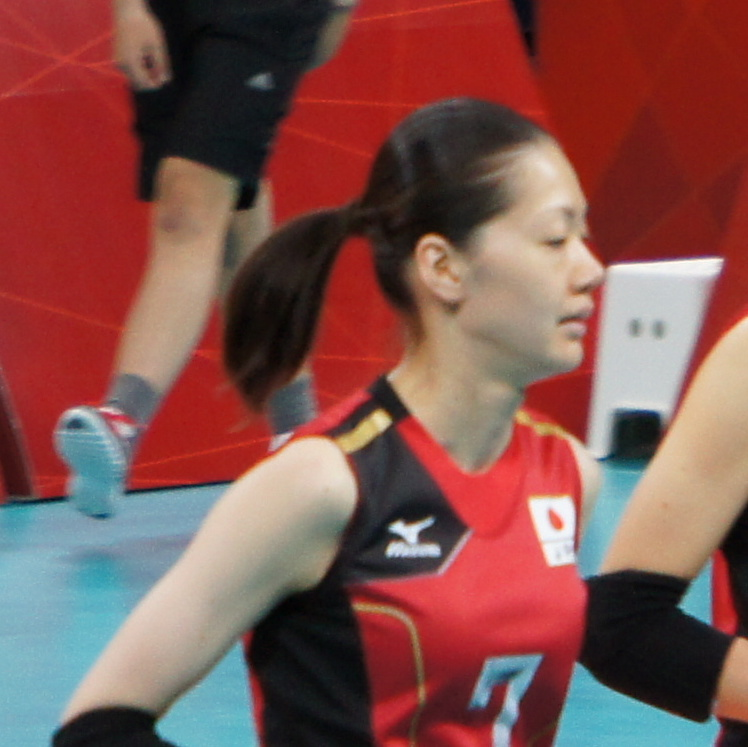

Personal information
- Full name: Kaori Inoue
- Nickname: killer
- Born: October 21, 1982 (age 44); Toyooka, Hyogo, Japan
- Height: 182 cm (6 ft 0 in)
- Weight: 59 kg (130 lb)
- Spike: 295 cm (116 in)
- Block: 286 cm (113 in)

Volleyball information
- Position: Middle Blocker
- Current club: Retired

National team
Japan
Medal record
Women's volleyball
Representing Japan
Olympic Games
Bronze medal – third place	2012 London	Team
World Championship
Bronze medal – third place	2010 Japan	Team
Asian Championship
Bronze medal – third place	2009 Hanoi

Kaori Inoue (井上香織 Inoue Kaori, born October 21, 1982) is retired a Japanese volleyball player who plays for Denso Airybees. On 23 September 2008, Airybees announced her marriage. She serves as the captain of the team from 2009. She was part of the Japanese team that won the bronze medal at the 2012 Summer Olympics. Her retirement was announced in 2015.

== Clubs ==
- Hikami High School → Denso Airybees (2001-)

== Awards ==
=== Individuals ===
- 2007 2006-07 V.Premier.League Block awards, Best 6 awards
- 2008 2007-08 V.Premier.League Best 6 awards
- 2008 Kurowashiki All Japan Volleyball Championship Most Valuable Player

=== Team ===
- 2008 2007-08 Japan Volleyball League/V.League/V.Premier - Runner-up, with Denso.
- 2008 57th Kurowashiki All Japan Volleyball Championship - Champion, with Denso.
- 2010 Empress's Cup - Champion, with Denso.

=== National team ===
- 2009 Asian Championship - Bronze medal
- 2010 World Championship - Bronze medal
- 2012 Olympics - Bronze medal
