= Chiaki Ishibashi =

Japanese swimmer (born 1991)

Personal information
- Born: June 22, 1991 (age 35)

Sport
- Sport: Swimming

Chiaki Ishibashi (石橋 千彰, Ishibashi Chiaki; born 22 June 1991) is a Japanese swimmer. He competed in the 4 × 200 metre freestyle relay event at the 2012 Summer Olympics.
