= Sho Sotodate =

Japanese swimmer (born 1991)

Personal information
- Born: August 5, 1991 (age 34) Abashiri, Japan

Sport
- Sport: Swimming
Medal record
Representing Japan
Summer Universiade
Silver medal – second place	2011 Shenzhen	4x200m freestyle relay

Sho Sotodate (外舘 祥, Sotodate Shō; born 5 August 1991) is a Japanese swimmer. He competed in the 4 × 200 metre freestyle relay event at the 2012 Summer Olympics.
