= Zenjiro Yasuda (field hockey) =

Japanese field hockey coach

Zenjiro Yasuda (born August 1, 1946) is a Japanese field hockey coach. At the 2012 Summer Olympics he coached the Japan women's national field hockey team.
