= Nina Saeedyokota =

Japanese rhythmic gymnast

- Saeed Yokota at the 2012 Summer Olympics

Personal information
- Born: 2 March 1994 (age 32) Kiyose, Japan
- Height: 171 cm (5 ft 7 in)

Gymnastics career
- Discipline: Rhythmic gymnastics
- Country represented: Japan; (2010–2015)
Medal record
Asian Championships
Gold medal – first place	2013 Tashkent	10 clubs
Silver medal – second place	2013 Tashkent	Group all-around
Silver medal – second place	2013 Tashkent	3 balls + 2 ribbons

Nina Saeed Yokota (サイード横田仁奈, Saeedyokota Nina; born 2 March 1994) is a Japanese retired group rhythmic gymnast who competed at the 2012 Summer Olympics. She won two silvers and a gold medal at the 2013 Asian Championships.

== Early life ==
Saeed Yokota was born in Kiyose, Tokyo. Her mother is Japanese, and her father is Pakistani. She has a younger sister who was a trainee member of the idol group AKB48.

== Career ==
Saeed Yokota began gymnastics at age 6 to increase her flexibility, as her body was very stiff. She became a member of the national group in December 2009. The Japanese national group spent much of the period from 2009 to 2012 training in Russia.

At the 2010 World Championships, she and her fellow group members placed 6th in the all-around. The next year, at the 2011 World Championships, they placed 5th.

In June 2012, the members of the 2012 Summer Olympic team were announced. Saeed Yokoto was one of those selected. The Japanese team qualified to the final at the Olympics and finished in 7th place.

After the Olympics, Saeed Yokota had an injury that required hospitalization. She considered whether to attempt to compete at the 2016 Summer Olympics as well, but she ultimately decided to enter the workforce. During her rehabilitation, she met athletes from other sports and was surprised to find that they trained less than she did; it was typical for her to train 12 hours a day. After her retirement, Saeed Yokoto described her training environment as one where she constantly struggled to keep her weight low and the pressure before team auditions was intense.

At the 2013 Asian Championships, she won three medals - gold in the 10 clubs event and silver in the all-around and mixed apparatus finals. She competed at the 2013 World Championships, where the group was 8th in the all-around.

Saeed Yokota announced her retirement on 1 February, 2015.

== Post-gymnastics career and personal life ==
Saeed Yokota graduated from Kokushikan University in April 2016. She began working at Under Armour, where she met Yusuke Omae, whom she married in 2022. They had a child together in 2023. She has also worked as a coach and judge.

She participated in Miss Universe Japan 2020 and finished in the top 11 finalists. Speaking of learning how to express herself in the event's required speeches, she praised Naomi Osaka for her activism against anti-black discrimination: "Being of mixed heritage and such myself, it was cool to see her speak while being so well-informed."
