= Karin Vexman =

Israeli rhythmic gymnast (born 2001)

- קארין וקסמן
- Born: 16 December 2001 (age 24) Israel

Gymnastics career
- Discipline: Rhythmic gymnastics
- Country represented: Israel
- Head coach: Ira Vigdorchik
- Choreographer: Rahel Vigdozchik
Medal record
Representing Israel
Rhythmic gymnastics
European Championships
Gold medal – first place	2020 Kyiv	Group All-around
Gold medal – first place	2021 Varna	3 Hoops + 4 Clubs
Silver medal – second place	2020 Kyiv	Team
Silver medal – second place	2020 Kyiv	5 Balls
Bronze medal – third place	2021 Varna	Team
Bronze medal – third place	2021 Varna	Group All-around
Bronze medal – third place	2021 Varna	5 Balls

Karin Vexman (Hebrew: קארין וקסמן. Born 16 December 2001) is an Israeli individual and group rhythmic gymnast. She is the 2020 European Group All-around champion and a seven-time European medalist. She represented Israel at the 2020 Summer Olympics.

== Career ==
Vexman began rhythmic gymnastics when she was four years old in her hometown, Ashdod.

In 2018, she joined the Israeli senior group. She competed at the 2018 World Championships in Sofia with the group that placed 15th in the all-around, and they did not advance into any apparatus finals. She also competed at the 2019 World Championships in Baku, where the Israeli group finished sixth in the all-around. Additionally, Israel advanced to the 5 balls final, finishing fourth, and the 3 hoops and 4 clubs final, finishing sixth.

In November 2020, Vexman won a gold medal at the 2020 European Championships in the group all-around. She also won silver medals in the team and the 5 balls competitions, both behind Ukraine. At the 2021 European Championships in Varna, Bulgaria, she helped Israel win a gold medal in the 3 hoops + 4 clubs final. She also won bronze medals in the 5 balls, group all-around and team competitions. She competed at the 2021 Baku World Cup where Israel placed eighth in the group all-around.

Vexman represented Israel at the 2020 Summer Olympics in Tokyo, alongside Yana Kramarenko, Natalie Raits, Yuliana Telegina and Ofir Dayan. They advanced to the group all-around final and placed sixth. She announced her retirement from rhythmic gymnastics after the Olympics.
