= Natalie Raits =

Israeli rhythmic gymnast

- נטלי רייץ
- Born: 1 July 2002 (age 24) Eilat, Israel

Gymnastics career
- Discipline: Rhythmic gymnastics
- Country represented: Israel
- Head coach: Ira Vigdorchik
- Choreographer: Rahel Vigdozchik
Medal record
Rhythmic gymnastics
Representing Israel
European Championships
Gold medal – first place	2021 Varna	3 hoops + 4 clubs
Bronze medal – third place	2021 Varna	Team
Bronze medal – third place	2021 Varna	Group All-around
Bronze medal – third place	2021 Varna	5 balls

Natalie Raits (Hebrew: נטלי רייץ; born 1 July 2002) is an Israeli former group rhythmic gymnast. She won four medals at the 2021 European Championships and represented Israel at the 2020 Summer Olympics.

== Early life ==
Raits was born in Eilat, Israel. She began training in gymnastics at age 4.

== Career ==
In 2016, Raits came in second in the junior all-around competition at the International Rhythmic Gymnastics Tournament in Corbeil-Essonnes, France.

Raits became age-eligible for senior competitions in 2018. She competed at the 2018 World Championships, where team Israel finished in 15th in the group all-around. She competed at 2019 World Championships, where team Israel finished in sixth in the group all-around. There, Israel also advanced to the 5 balls final, finishing fourth, and the 3 hoops and 4 clubs final, finishing sixth.

Raits won silver medals at the 2019 Cluj-Napoca World Challenge Cup and at the 2021 Tashkent World Cup in the group all-around. Additionally, she won a silver medal in the 5 balls final at the 2019 Tashkent World Cup. She competed at the 2021 European Championships where she won a gold medal in the 3 hoops + 4 clubs final. She also won bronze medals in the 5 balls, group all-around and team competitions.

Raits represented Israel at the 2020 Summer Olympics, alongside Ofir Dayan, Yana Kramarenko, Yuliana Telegina and Karin Vexman. The team advanced to the group all-around final, where they finished in sixth place. She retired after the 2020 Summer Olympics.

== Personal life ==
Raits has said her sport role model is Usain Bolt, and her favorite singer is Hanan ben-Ari. She designs custom clothing.
