= List of medalists at the Rhythmic Gymnastics Junior European Championships =

This is a list of medalists at the Rhythmic Gymnastics Junior European Championships, organized by the European Union of Gymnastics since 1987.

== 1980s ==
1987
Athens, Greece

| Event | Gold | Silver | Bronze | Ref. |
| Individual all-around | (Bulgaria) Elizabeth Koleva | (Bulgaria) Albene Dimitrova | (Bulgaria) Mariela Pachalieva | |
| Rope | (Bulgaria) Albene Dimitrova (Bulgaria) Elizabeth Koleva (Soviet Union) Alexandra Timoshenko | — | — | |
| Hoop | (Bulgaria) Elizabeth Koleva | (Soviet Union) Natalia Liutova (Soviet Union) Alexandra Timoshenko | — | |
| Ball | (Bulgaria) Mariela Pachalieva (Bulgaria) Elizabeth Koleva (Soviet Union) Larissa Medvedeva | — | — | |
| Ribbon | (Bulgaria) Albene Dimitrova (Bulgaria) Elizabeth Koleva | — | (Soviet Union) Alexandra Timoshenko (Soviet Union) Larissa Medvedeva | |
| Group all-around | Bulgaria | Spain | Poland | |

1989
Tenerife, Spain

| Event | Gold | Silver | Bronze | Ref. |
| Team all-around | Bulgaria; Mila Marinova; Dimitrinka Todorova; Teodora Blagoeva | Soviet Union; Kristina Kliukevichute; Elena Shamatulskaya; Natalia Sinitaina | Spain; Rosabel Espinosa; Romo Ada Liberio; Edi Moreno | |
| Individual all-around | (Bulgaria) Dimitrinka Todorova | (Bulgaria) Mila Marinova | (Soviet Union) Kristina Kliukevichute | |
| Rope | (Bulgaria) Dimitrinka Todorova (Bulgaria) Mila Marinova | — | (Soviet Union) Kristina Kliukevichute | |
| Hoop | (Bulgaria) Mila Marinova | (Bulgaria) Dimitrinka Todorova (Soviet Union) Kristina Kliukevichute | — | |
| Ball | (Bulgaria) Dimitrinka Todorova (Bulgaria) Mila Marinova (Soviet Union) Elena Shamatulskaya | — | — | |
| Clubs | (Soviet Union) Kristina Kliukevichute | (Bulgaria) Dimitrinka Todorova (Spain) Romo Ada Liberio (Soviet Union) Natalia Sinitaina | — | |
| Group all-around | Bulgaria | Soviet Union | Spain | |

== 1990s ==
1991
Lisbon, Portugal

| Event | Gold | Silver | Bronze | Ref. |
| Team all-around | Soviet Union; Amina Zaripova; Elena Vitrichenko; Kateryna Serebrianska | Bulgaria; Zornitza Kalenska; Diana Popova; Iva Ivanova | Spain; Rosabel Espinosa; Carolina Borell; Barbara Plaza | |
| Individual all-around | (Bulgaria) Zornitza Kalenska | (Bulgaria) Diana Popova | (Spain) Rosabel Espinosa (Soviet Union) Amina Zaripova | |
| Hoop | (Bulgaria) Diana Popova | (Bulgaria) Zornitza Kalenska (Soviet Union) Kateryna Serebrianska | — | |
| Ball | (Soviet Union) Kateryna Serebrianska | (Soviet Union) Elena Vitrichenko | (Spain) Rosabel Espinosa | |
| Clubs | (Soviet Union) Elena Vitrichenko | (Spain) Rosabel Espinosa | (Bulgaria) Zornitza Kalenska (Soviet Union) Amina Zaripova (Spain) Carolina Borell | |
| Ribbon | (Bulgaria) Diana Popova | (Spain) Rosabel Espinosa | (Greece) Maria Sansaridou | |
| Group all-around | Spain | Soviet Union | Bulgaria | |

1993
Bucharest, Romania

| Event | Gold | Silver | Bronze | Ref. |
| Team all-around | Bulgaria; Boriana Docheva; Elena Stefanova; Stella Salapatiyska | Romania; Filis Serif; Dana Carteleanu; Alina Stoica | Ukraine; Victoria Stadnik; Inga Kovalchouk; Tatiana Popova | |
| Individual all-around | (Belarus) Olga Gontar | (Russia) Yana Batyrshina | (Bulgaria) Stella Salapatiyska | |
| Rope | (Russia) Yana Batyrshina | (Belarus) Olga Gontar | (Bulgaria) Elena Stefanova (Ukraine) Victoria Stadnik | |
| Ball | (Belarus) Olga Gontar | (Russia) Yana Batyrshina | (Ukraine) Victoria Stadnik | |
| Clubs | (Russia) Yana Batyrshina | (Italy) Katia Pietrosanti (Bulgaria) Elena Stefanova | — | |
| Ribbon | (Belarus) Olga Gontar | (Russia) Yana Batyrshina | (Russia) Evgenia Kouzkina (Ukraine) Victoria Stadnik | |

1994
Thessalonika, Greece

| Event | Gold | Silver | Bronze | Ref. |
| Group all-around | Greece | Bulgaria | Russia | |

1995
Prague, Czech Republic

| Event | Gold | Silver | Bronze | Ref. |
| Team all-around | Russia; Yelena Shalamova; Anna Chichova; Viktoria Anikina | Belarus; Yulia Raskina; Valeria Vatkina; Anna Glazkova | Bulgaria; Teodora Alexandrova; Borislava Ilieva | |
| Individual all-around | (Bulgaria) Teodora Alexandrova (Belarus) Valeria Vatkina | — | (Russia) Yelena Shalamova | |
| Rope | (Russia) Yelena Shalamova | (Bulgaria) Teodora Alexandrova | (Russia) Anna Chichova | |
| Hoop | (Bulgaria) Teodora Alexandrova (Russia) Yelena Shalamova | — | (Russia) Anna Chichova | |
| Clubs | (Russia) Yelena Shalamova | (Bulgaria) Teodora Alexandrova | (Belarus) Yulia Raskina | |
| Ribbon | (Russia) Yelena Shalamova | — | (Bulgaria) Teodora Alexandrova (Belarus) Valeria Vatkina | |

1996
Asker, Norway

| Event | Gold | Silver | Bronze | Ref. |
| Group 6 balls | Russia | Belarus | Italy | |

1997
Patras, Greece

| Event | Gold | Silver | Bronze | Ref. |
| Group 12 clubs | Greece | Belarus | Russia | |

1999
Budapest, Hungary

| Event | Gold | Silver | Bronze | Ref. |
| Group 5 ribbons | Russia | Bulgaria | Greece | |

== 2000s ==
2001
Geneva, Switzerland

| Event | Gold | Silver | Bronze | Ref. |
| Group 5 ropes | Russia | Greece | Belarus | |

2003
Riesa, Germany

| Event | Gold | Silver | Bronze | Ref. |
| Group 5 hoops | Russia | Greece | Bulgaria | |

2005
Moscow, Russia

| Event | Gold | Silver | Bronze | Ref. |
| Group 5 balls | Belarus | Russia | Greece | |

2006
Moscow, Russia

| Event | Gold | Silver | Bronze | Ref. |
| Team all-around | Russia; Ekaterina Donich; Aleksandra Ermakova; Daria Kondakova; Natalia Pichuzhkina | Belarus; Anastasia Ivankova; Maria Yushkevich | Bulgaria; Bilyana Prodanova; Filipa Siderova | |
| Rope | (Russia) Aleksandra Ermakova | (Belarus) Anastasia Ivankova | (Bulgaria) Filipa Siderova | |
| Hoop | (Russia) Ekaterina Donich | (Bulgaria) Filipa Siderova | (Ukraine) Valeriya Shurkhal | |
| Clubs | (Russia) Natalia Pichuzhkina | (Belarus) Maria Yushkevich | (Ukraine) Darya Kushnerova | |
| Ribbon | (Russia) Daria Kondakova | (Bulgaria) Bilyana Prodanova | (Ukraine) Darya Kushnerova | |

2007
Baku, Azerbaijan

| Event | Gold | Silver | Bronze | Ref. |
| Group 10 clubs | Russia | Bulgaria | Belarus | |

2008
Torino, Italy

| Event | Gold | Silver | Bronze | Ref. |
| Team all-around | Russia; Daria Andronova; Diana Botsieva; Daria Dmitrieva; Yana Lukonina | Belarus; Aliaksandra Narkevich; Hanna Rabtsava; Melitina Staniouta | Ukraine; Viktoria Mazur; Ganna Rizatdinova; Tatiana Zahododnya | |
| Rope | (Russia) Daria Andronova | (Belarus) Melitina Staniouta | (Bulgaria) Tsvetelina Stoyanova | |
| Hoop | (Belarus) Aliaksandra Narkevich | (Russia) Diana Botsieva | (Bulgaria) Gabriela Kirova | |
| Ball | (Russia) Yana Lukonina | (Bulgaria) Boyanka Angelova | (Belarus) Hanna Rabtsava | |
| Ribbon | (Russia) Daria Dmitrieva | (Belarus) Melitina Staniouta | (Italy) Federica Febbo | |

2009
Baku, Azerbaijan

| Event | Gold | Silver | Bronze | Ref. |
| Group 5 ribbons | Russia | Azerbaijan | Belarus | |

== 2010s ==
2010
Bremen, Germany

| Event | Gold | Silver | Bronze | Ref. |
| Team all-around | Russia; Alexandra Merkulova; Valeria Tkachenko | Belarus; Arina Charopa; Nataliya Leshchyk | Germany; Jana Berezko-Marggrander; Laura Jung | |
| Rope | (Russia) Alexandra Merkulova | (Belarus) Arina Charopa | (Ukraine) Viktoriia Shynkarenko | |
| Hoop | (Russia) Valeria Tkachenko | (Belarus) Nataliya Leshchyk | (Germany) Jana Berezko-Marggrander | |
| Ball | (Russia) Alexandra Merkulova | (Azerbaijan) Lala Yusifova | (Germany) Jana Berezko-Marggrander | |
| Ribbon | (Russia) Valeria Tkachenko | (Belarus) Arina Charopa | (Ukraine) Oleksandra Gridasova | |

2011
Minsk, Belarus

| Event | Gold | Silver | Bronze | Ref. |
| Group all-around | Belarus; Darya Antukhevich; Krystsina Kastsevich; Maryia Katsiak; Alesia Lozka; Aliaksandra Papova; Katsiaryna Smousenok | Russia; Ralina Rakipova; Evgeniya Sheryaeva; Daria Svatkovskaya; Ekaterina Tarasova; Anna Trubnikova; Natalia Vlasova | Israel; Adar Elhaik; Alona Koshevatskiy; Irina Kurzanov; Ekaterina Levina; Inna Naroditski; Alina Petrov | |
| Group 5 ropes | Russia; Ralina Rakipova; Evgeniya Sheryaeva; Daria Svatkovskaya; Ekaterina Tarasova; Anna Trubnikova; Natalia Vlasova | Belarus; Darya Antukhevich; Krystsina Kastsevich; Maryia Katsiak; Alesia Lozka; Aliaksandra Papova; Katsiaryna Smousenok | Azerbaijan; Mansura Bagiyeva; Sabina Garatova; Aynur Jabbarli; Aysha Mustafayeva; Siyana Vasileva; Lala Yusifova | |

2012
Nizhny Novgorod, Russia

| Event | Gold | Silver | Bronze | Ref. |
| Team all-around | Russia; Diana Borisova; Yana Kudryavtseva; Julia Sinitsyna; Aleksandra Soldatova | Belarus; Elena Bolotina; Katsiaryna Halkina; Maria Kadobina | Georgia; Gabriela Khvedelidze; Salome Phajava; Sophio Pharulava | |
| Hoop | (Russia) Diana Borisova | (Belarus) Elena Bolotina | (Azerbaijan) Nilufar Niftaliyeva | |
| Ball | (Russia) Yana Kudryavtseva | (Belarus) Katsiaryna Halkina | (Ukraine) Anastasiia Mulmina | |
| Clubs | (Russia) Julia Sinitsyna | (Belarus) Maria Kadobina | (Georgia (country)) Gabriela Khvedelidze | |
| Ribbon | (Russia) Aleksandra Soldatova | (Belarus) Katsiaryna Halkina | (Azerbaijan) Gulsum Shafizada | |

2013
Vienna, Austria

| Event | Gold | Silver | Bronze | Ref. |
| Group all-around | Russia; Anna Berkutova; Daria Pirogova; Daria Dubova; Victoria Ilina; Natalia Safonova | Belarus; Yauheniya Vensko; Vlada Zyryanova; Krystsina Sheida; Yana Chornaya; Katsiaryna Dalinkina; Khrystsina Novikava | Bulgaria; Elena Bineva; Aleksandra Mitrovich; Laura Traets; Emiliya Radicheva; Sofiya Rangelova | |
| Group 5 hoops | Russia; Anna Berkutova; Daria Pirogova; Daria Dubova; Victoria Ilina; Natalia Safonova | Azerbaijan; Gulsum Shafizada; Nilufar Niftaliyeva; Sabina Hummatova; Aliaksandra Platonova; Emilya Bagiyeva | Belarus; Yauheniya Vensko; Vlada Zyryanova; Krystsina Sheida; Yana Chornaya; Katsiaryna Dalinkina; Khrystsina Novikava | |

2014
Baku, Azerbaijan

| Event | Gold | Silver | Bronze | Ref. |
| Team all-around | Russia; Yulia Bravikova; Irina Annenkova; Olesya Petrova; Veronika Polyakova | Belarus; Mariya Trubach; Stefaniya-Sofiya Manakhava; Anastasiya Rybakova | Azerbaijan; Zhala Piriyeva; Zuleykha Ismayilova | |
| Hoop | (Russia) Yulia Bravikova | (Azerbaijan) Zhala Piriyeva | (Belarus) Anastasiya Rybakova | |
| Ball | (Russia) Irina Annenkova | (Belarus) Mariya Trubach | (Bulgaria) Boryana Kaleyn | |
| Clubs | (Russia) Olesya Petrova | (Belarus) Mariya Trubach | (Israel) Linoy Ashram | |
| Ribbon | (Russia) Irina Annenkova | (Ukraine) Valeriya Khanina | (Israel) Linoy Ashram | |

2015
Minsk, Belarus

| Event | Gold | Silver | Bronze | Ref. |
| Group all-around | Russia; Ekaterina Fedorova; Anastasia Kalabina; Mariia Kravtsova; Kseniia Poliakova; Angelina Shkatova | Belarus; Marharyta Avadzinskaya; Alina Harnasko; Anastasiya Rybakova; Aliaksandra Saladukha; Hanna Shvaiba; Karyna Yarmolenka | Israel; Ofir Dayan; Adi Luiza Kurasov; Kseniya Silin; Nicol Voronkov; Nicol Zelikman | |
| Group 5 hoops | Belarus; Marharyta Avadzinskaya; Alina Harnasko; Anastasiya Rybakova; Aliaksandra Saladukha; Hanna Shvaiba; Karyna Yarmolenka | Russia; Ekaterina Fedorova; Anastasia Kalabina; Mariia Kravtsova; Kseniia Poliakova; Angelina Shkatova | Bulgaria; Teodora Alexandrova; Vivian Chernookova; Madlen Radukanova; Madlen Sergeeva; Staniela Yovcheva | |

2016
Holon, Israel

| Event | Gold | Silver | Bronze | Ref. |
| Team all-around | Russia; Alina Ermolova; Polina Shmatko; Maria Sergeeva | Belarus; Julia Evchik; Alina Harnasko; Yuliya Isachanka | Italy; Alexandra Agiurgiuculese; Milena Baldassarri | |
| Rope | (Russia) Alina Ermolova | (Belarus) Julia Evchik | (Italy) Alexandra Agiurgiuculese | |
| Hoop | (Russia) Maria Sergeeva | (Belarus) Alina Harnasko (Israel) Nicol Zelikman | — | |
| Ball | (Russia) Polina Shmatko | (Italy) Alexandra Agiurgiuculese | (Israel) Nicol Zelikman | |
| Clubs | (Russia) Polina Shmatko | (Italy) Alexandra Agiurgiuculese | (Belarus) Yuliya Isachanka | |

2017
Budapest, Hungary

| Event | Gold | Silver | Bronze | Ref. |
| Team | Russia | Belarus | Bulgaria | |
| Group 10 clubs | Russia; Diana Menzhinskaya; Olga Sadomskaia; Elizaveta Bogatckova; Kristina Telianikova; Ksenia Markova; Daria Perevozchikova | Italy; Anna Paola Cantatore; Nina Corradini; Melissa Girelli; Francesca Pellegrini; Talisa Torretti; Rebecca Vinti | Israel; Yana Kramarenko; Shani Kataev; Michelle Segal; Yuliana Telegina; Lizi El-Ad; Shai Ben Ruby | |

2018
Guadajalara, Spain

| Event | Gold | Silver | Bronze | Ref. |
| Team all-around | Russia; Polina Shmatko; Daria Trubnikova; Anastasia Sergeeva; Lala Kramarenko | Ukraine; Khrystyna Pohranychna; Viktoriia Onopriienko | Bulgaria; Tatyana Volozhanina; Anna Kelman; Elizabet Yovcheva | |
| Ribbon | (Russia) Lala Kramarenko | (Ukraine) Khrystyna Pohranychna | (Italy) Talisa Torretti | |
| Hoop | (Russia) Polina Shmatko | (Bulgaria) Tatyana Volozhanina | (Ukraine) Khrystyna Pohranychna | |
| Ball | (Russia) Lala Kramarenko | (Ukraine) Khrystyna Pohranychna | (Azerbaijan) Arzu Jalilova | |
| Clubs | (Russia) Daria Trubnikova | (Belarus) Anna Kamenshchikova | (Israel) Valeria Sotskova | |

2019
Baku, Azerbaijan

| Event | Gold | Silver | Bronze | Ref. |
| Team | Russia | Belarus | Bulgaria | |
| Group All-Around | Russia; Amina Khaldarova; Elizaveta Koteneva; Anna Batasova; Aleksandra Semibratova; Dana Semirenko; Alisa Tishchenko | Belarus; Palina Aliaksandrava; Yauheniya Kel; Polina Kovalyova; Viktoriya Padkidysh; Palina Slancheuskaya; Marharyta Yatseuskaya | Italy; Siria Cella; Alessia Leone; Alexandra Naclerio; Serena Ottaviani; Vittoria Quoiani; Giulia Segatori | |
| Group 5 hoops | Russia; Amina Khaldarova; Elizaveta Koteneva; Anna Batasova; Aleksandra Semibratova; Dana Semirenko; Alisa Tishchenko | Ukraine; Viktoriia Denysenko; Nikol Krasiuk; Alina Melnyk; Oleksandra Panchuk; Daria Shcherbakova; Sofiia Tsybulia | Belarus; Palina Aliaksandrava; Yauheniya Kel; Polina Kovalyova; Viktoriya Padkidysh; Palina Slancheuskaya; Marharyta Yatseuskaya | |
| Group 5 ribbons | Russia; Amina Khaldarova; Elizaveta Koteneva; Anna Batasova; Aleksandra Semibratova; Dana Semirenko; Alisa Tishchenko | Israel; Amit Hedvat; Emili Malka; Mishel Mialitz; Romi Paritzki; Duaba Svertsov | Belarus; Palina Aliaksandrava; Yauheniya Kel; Polina Kovalyova; Viktoriya Padkidysh; Palina Slancheuskaya; Marharyta Yatseuskaya | |

== 2020s ==
2020
Kiev, Ukraine

| Event | Gold | Silver | Bronze | Ref. |
| Team all-around | Ukraine; Polina Karika; Karina Sydorak; Melaniia Tur | Israel; Daria Atamanov; Alona Hillel | Azerbaijan; Narmin Bayramova; Leyli Aghazada | |
| Rope | (Belarus) Dina Agisheva | (Israel) Daria Atamanov | (Bulgaria) Eva Brezalieva | |
| Ball | (Ukraine) Polina Karika | (Bulgaria) Stiliana Nikolova | (Belarus) Yelyzaveta Zorkina | |
| Clubs | (Israel) Daria Atamanov | (Belarus) Yelyzaveta Zorkina | (Hungary) Evelin Viktória Kocsis | |
| Ribbon | (Bulgaria) Stiliana Nikolova | (Ukraine) Karina Sydorak | (Israel) Daria Atamanov | |

2021
Varna, Bulgaria

| Event | Gold | Silver | Bronze | Ref. |
| Group All-Around | Russia; Milena An; Mariia Fedorovtseva; Anna Grosh; Sofiia Iakovleva; Nonna Nianina; Elizaveta Tataeva | Bulgaria; Kristiana Doycheva; Kamelia Petrova; Suzan Pouladian; Maria Stamenova; Gergana Trendafilova; Aleksandra Vasileva | Israel; Shani Bakanov; Eliza Banchuk; Alona Hillel; Emili Malka; Simona Rudnik | |
| Group 5 Balls | Russia; Milena An; Mariia Fedorovtseva; Anna Grosh; Sofiia Iakovleva; Nonna Nianina; Elizaveta Tataeva | Bulgaria; Kristiana Doycheva; Kamelia Petrova; Suzan Pouladian; Maria Stamenova; Gergana Trendafilova; Aleksandra Vasileva | Belarus; Palina Aliaksandrava; Antanina Katulina; Palina Slancheuskaya; Kseniya Svirskaya; Varvara Yushko; Daria Vyshnikova | |
| Group 5 Ribbons | Russia; Milena An; Mariia Fedorovtseva; Anna Grosh; Sofiia Iakovleva; Nonna Nianina; Elizaveta Tataeva | Bulgaria; Kristiana Doycheva; Kamelia Petrova; Suzan Pouladian; Maria Stamenova; Gergana Trendafilova; Aleksandra Vasileva | Israel; Shani Bakanov; Eliza Banchuk; Alona Hillel; Emili Malka; Simona Rudnik | |
