= Narmin Bayramova =

Azerbaijani rhythmic gymnast (born 2005)

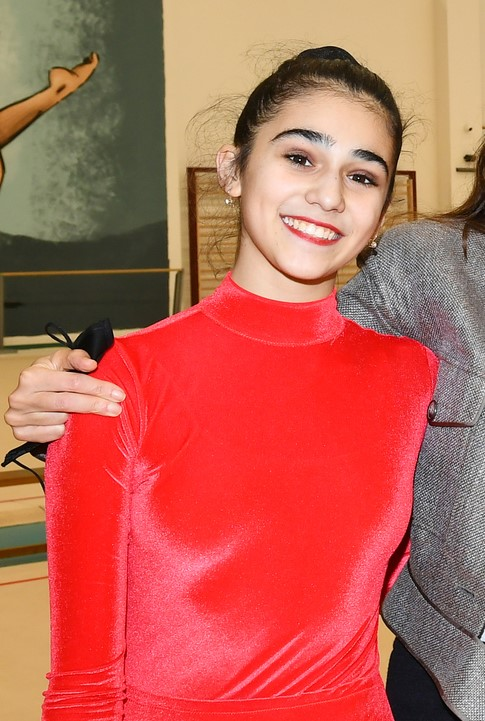
- Born: 3 December 2005 (age 20) Baku, Azerbaijan

Gymnastics career
- Discipline: Rhythmic gymnastics
- Country represented: Azerbaijan (2019-)
- Club: Ojaq Sports Club
- Head coach: Mariana Vasileva
- Assistant coach: Siyana Vasileva
Medal record
Representing Azerbaijan
Rhythmic Gymnastics
European Championships
Bronze medal – third place	2020 Kyiv	Team

Narmin Bayramova (Azerbaijani: Nərmin Bayramova; born 3 December 2005) is an Azerbaijani rhythmic gymnast. She represents her country in international competitions.

== Career ==
Narmin won gold at both Baku Championships and Azerbaijan Championships in 2017. The following year she won silver at the "Irina Cup" in Warsaw.

In 2020 she was selected to participate in the 2020 European Championships in Kyiv along Alina Gozalova, Leyli Aghazada, Ilona Zeynalova and the senior group, ending 10th with rope and 6th with ribbon also achieving the bronze medal in the team category.

In 2021 she debuted as a senior, taking part in the World Championships along Zohra Aghamirova, Arzu Jalilova and the senior group, competing with ribbon Bayramova took 41st place with the apparatus.

== Routine music information ==
Year	Apparatus	Music Title
2021	Hoop	
2021	Ball	
2021	Clubs	
2021	Ribbon	Nocturne No.20 In C Sharp Minor by Frédéric Chopin
2020	Rope	Rome and Juliet: Love Theme by Prague Philarmonica & Nick Ingam
2020	Ball	
2020	Clubs	
2020	Ribbon	Nocturne No.20 In C Sharp Minor by Frédéric Chopin
2019	Rope	Були на селі by Vopli Vidopliassova
2019	Ball	
2019	Clubs	
2019	Ribbon	Nocturne No.20 In C Sharp Minor by Frédéric Chopin

== See also ==
- List of medalists at the Rhythmic Gymnastics Junior European Championships
