= Ofir Dayan =

Israeli rhythmic gymnast

- אופיר דיין
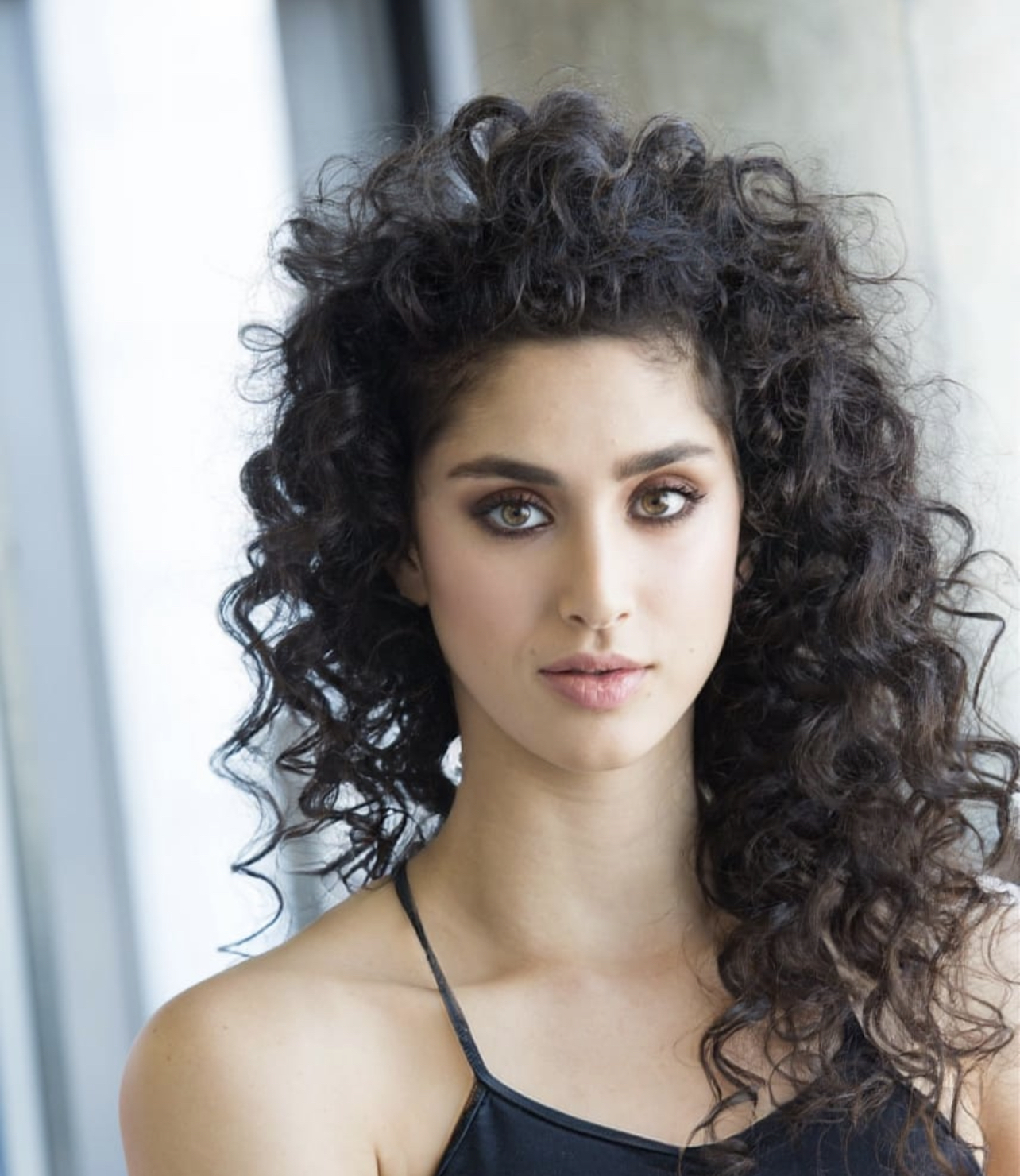
- Dayan in 2021

Personal information
- Born: 12 March 2000 (age 26) Israel

Gymnastics career
- Discipline: Rhythmic gymnastics
- Country represented: Israel
- Head coach: Ira Vigdorchik
- Choreographer: Rahel Vigdozchik
Medal record
Rhythmic gymnastics
Representing Israel
European Championships
Gold medal – first place	2020 Kyiv	Group All-around
Gold medal – first place	2021 Varna	3 hoops + 4 clubs
Silver medal – second place	2020 Kyiv	Team
Silver medal – second place	2020 Kyiv	5 balls
Bronze medal – third place	2021 Varna	Team
Bronze medal – third place	2021 Varna	Group All-around
Bronze medal – third place	2021 Varna	5 Balls
Junior European Championships
Bronze medal – third place	2015 Minsk	Group All-around

Ofir Dayan (Hebrew: אופיר דיין; born 12 March 2000) is an Israeli former group rhythmic gymnast. She is a seven-time European Championships medalist, and she represented Israel at the 2020 Summer Olympics.

== Early life ==
Dayan's father competed internationally for Israel in handball. She began training in artistic gymnastics when she was eight years old. However, due to an elbow injury, she was persuaded to switch to rhythmic gymnastics.

== Rhythmic gymnastics career ==
Dayan competed at the 2015 Junior European Championships where she won bronze in the group all-around.

Dayan became age-eligible for senior competitions in 2016 and joined the senior national group. She competed at the 2018 World Championships, where team Israel finished in 15th in the group all-around. She also competed at 2019 World Championships, where team Israel finished in sixth in the group all-around. Additionally, Israel advanced to the 5 balls final, finishing fourth, and the 3 hoops and 4 clubs final, finishing sixth.

Dayan competed at the 2020 European Championships where she won a gold medal in the group all-around. Additionally, she helped Israel win silver medals in the 5 balls final and in the team competition. She competed at the 2021 European Championships, where she won a gold medal in the 3 hoops + 4 clubs final. She also won bronze medals in the 5 balls, group all-around and team competitions.

Dayan represented Israel at the 2020 Summer Olympics, alongside Yana Kramarenko, Natalie Raits, Yuliana Telegina and Karin Vexman, and was the captain of the group. They advanced to the group all-around final and placed sixth. She announced her retirement from the sport after the Olympics.

== See also ==
- List of medalists at the Rhythmic Gymnastics Junior European Championships
