= Bar Shapochnikov =

Israeli rhythmic gymnast

- בר שפוצ'ניקוב
- Nickname: Shapo
- Born: June 12, 1999 (age 27) Israel

Gymnastics career
- Discipline: Rhythmic gymnastics
- Country represented: Israel (2017-present)
- Head coach: Ira Vigdorchik
- Assistant coach: Rahel Vigdorchik
- Choreographer: Rahel Vigdorchik
Medal record
Representing Israel
Rhythmic gymnastics
European Championships
Gold medal – first place	2020 Kyiv	Group All-around
Silver medal – second place	2020 Kyiv	Team
Silver medal – second place	2020 Kyiv	5 Balls

Bar Shapochnikov (Hebrew: בר שפוצ'ניקוב; born June 12, 1999, in Israel) is an Israeli individual and group rhythmic gymnast. She is the 2020 European Group All-around champion.

== Career ==
=== Senior ===
In 2017, she became senior and joined Israeli senior group. She made her World Championship debut at the 2018 World Championships in Sofia, Bulgaria, where she placed 15th in Group All-around. Her second World Championships participation was in 2019 in Baku, where she and her teammates placed 6th in Group All-around, 4th in 5 Balls final and 6th in 3 Hoops + 4 Clubs. In November 2020, they won gold medal at the 2020 European Championships in Group All-around and silver in Team competition.
