= Benrubi =

Benrubi (also spelled Ben Ruby) is a Jewish surname, common among Jews of Greece and of the former Ottoman Empire. Notable people with the surname include:

- Abraham Benrubi (born 1969), American actor
- Isaak Benrubi (1876–1943), Ottoman philosopher
- Shai Ben Ruby (born 2002), Israeli gymnast
- Yitzhak Ben-Ruby (1903–1977), Ottoman writer

== See also ==
- Benrubi SA, Greek manufacturer
