= Elsa Somville =

French rhythmic gymnast

- Born: 29 May 2006 (age 20) Calais, France

Gymnastics career
- Discipline: Rhythmic gymnastics
- Country represented: France (2020-)
- Club: Calais GRS
- Head coach: Svetlana Karbanov
- Former coach: Aude Vernalde
- Choreographer: Sacha Kla
Medal record
Rhythmic gymnastics
Representing France
National Championships
Silver medal – second place	2021 Calais	All-Around
Bronze medal – third place	2022 Calais	Ball

Elsa Somville (born 29 May 2006) is a French rhythmic gymnast. She represent her country in international competitions.

== Personal life ==
Somville trains 30 hours per week at the pole in Calais, her dream is to compete at the Olympic Games. Outside the gym her hobbies are going out with friends and shopping. She speaks French, English and German.

== Career ==
In 2020 Elsa was included in the French national team, debuting at the international tournament in Corbeil-Essonnes. The same year she was then selected to compete at the European Championships in Kyiv along Lily Ramonatxo ending 4th in teams, 17th with rope, 15th with ball, 21st with clubs and 7th in the ribbon final.

In 2021 she won silver at the French Rhythmic Gymnastics Championships behind Margot Tran in the junior section, she also won bronze with ball behind Hélène Karbanov and Maelle Millet. The following year she took 6th place at her first senior nationals as well as 6th in the hoop final.

== Routine music information ==
Year	Apparatus	Music Title
2022	Hoop	Crèditos - La Identidad Inaccesibile by Alberto Iglesias
2022	Ball	À l'ammoniaque/Mon dieu by La Zarra
2022	Clubs	New World by Victor Hugo's World
2022	Ribbon	Sympathy by Marillion
2020	Rope	Living On My Own (Julian Raymond Mix) by Freddie Mercury
2020	Ball	You've Got Time (chamber version) by Regina Spektor
2020	Clubs	Asturias by Artem Uzunov
2020	Ribbon	Були на селі by Vopli Vidopliassova
