= Nicol Voronkov =

Retired Israeli rhythmic gymnast

- ניקול וורונקוב
- Born: January 23, 2001 (age 25)

Gymnastics career
- Discipline: Rhythmic gymnastics
- Country represented: Israel (2015-2019)
- Retired: yes
Medal record
Representing Israel
Rhythmic gymnastics
World Championships
Silver medal – second place	2019 Baku	Team
Junior European Championships
Bronze medal – third place	2015 Minsk	Group All-around

Nicol Voronkov (Hebrew: ניקול וורונקוב; born 23 January 2001) is a retired Israeli rhythmic gymnast. She represented her country in international competitions.

== Career ==
=== Junior ===
In May 2015 Voronkov, Ofir Dayan, Adi Luiza Kurasov, Kseniya Silin and Nicol Zelikman won bronze in the junior groups' All-Around at the European Championships in Minsk. In 2016 at the Alina Cup in Moscow she won bronze in the team competition (with Nicol Zelikman, Yuliana Telegina and Yana Kramarenko).

=== Senior ===
She entered the senior category in 2017, debuting at the World Cup in Kazan where she took 22nd place in the All-Around. In August, after Zelikman got injured and Victoria Veinberg Filanovsky retired, she was selected along Ashram and the senior group for the World Championships in Pesaro, being 25th in the All-Around, 44th with hoop, 18th with ball, 32nd with clubs and 15th with ribbon.

In 2018 she competed at the World Cup in Sofia, finishing 8th overall and 7th with clubs. The following month she was 4th in the All-Around, with hoop and with ball and 5th with clubs in Portimão.

The following year, again in the World Cup in Portimão, she ended up 17th in the All-Around and 5th with ribbon. In September she was selected for the World Championships in Baku along Ashram, Zelikman and Telegina. There she only performed with clubs, taking 22nd place, and won silver in teams.
