= Melaniia Tur =

Ukrainian rhythmic gymnast

- מלניה טור
- Born: 8 March 2005 (age 21) Dnipropetrovsk, Ukraine

Gymnastics career
- Discipline: Rhythmic gymnastics
- Country represented: Israel (2019-)
- Former countries represented: Ukraine
- Club: Deriugina School
- Head coach: Irina Deriugina
- Assistant coach: Tetiana Molchanova
Medal record
European Championships
Gold medal – first place	2020 Kyiv	Team

Melaniia Olehivna Tur (Hebrew: מלניה טור; born 8 March 2005) is a Ukrainian-born Israeli rhythmic gymnast who formerly represented Ukraine. She is the 2020 Junior European champion in the team category.

== Career ==
=== Junior ===
Tur debuted at the 2019 Junior World Championships in Moscow as part of the Ukrainian group, being 16th in the all-around, with 5 hoops and in the team competition, as well as 12th with 5 ribbons. In 2020 she represented Ukraine in Kyiv at the European Championships as an individual, along with Polina Karika, Karina Sydorak and the senior group. Together they won gold in teams, and she also finished 6th with clubs.

She became a senior in 2021 and competed in the World Cup in Minsk, where she finished 12th in the all-around, 13th with hoop and ball, 15th with clubs and 12th with ribbon. In 2022 she competed at the World Cup in Pesaro and ended 20th in the all-around, 18th with hoop, 21st ball, 19th with clubs and 24th with ribbon. She was then selected for the European Championships in Tel Aviv, where she was 8th in teams, 27th in the all-around, 28th with hoop, 36th with ball and 36th with clubs.

In 2023, she changed her nationality to represent Israel, which came into effect in May 2024.

== See also ==
- List of medalists at the Rhythmic Gymnastics Junior European Championships
