= Eva Blanka Gyulai =

Hungarian rhythmic gymnast

Éva Blanka Gyulai
- Born: 31 October 2007 (age 18) Budapest, Hungary

Gymnastics career
- Discipline: Rhythmic gymnastics
- Country represented: Portugal; (2025-present)
- Former countries represented: Hungary
- Club: Sporting Club de Portugal
- Head coach: Sandra Conde Nunes
- Former coach: Tímea Koch-Tiringer

Éva Blanka Gyulai (born 31 October 2007) is a Hungarian rhythmic gymnast. She represents Portugal in international competitions since 2025.

== Career ==
=== Junior ===
In 2020 she represented Hungary with Evelin Viktória Kocsis, Blanka Krasznay and senior Fanni Pigniczki at the European Championships in Kyiv. She was 16th in rope and 19th in ribbon qualifications.

In 2022, she won bronze medal in hoop final at International Tournament in Portimão. She represented Hungary together with Szonja Voeroes at the 2022 European Championships in Tel Aviv, and took 12th place in team competition. She was 21st with hoop and 14th with ball in qualifications.

=== Senior ===
In 2023, she took 8th place in all-around and won bronze medal in ball final at Grand Prix Brno.

She competed at the 1st European Cup in Baku.

In 2025, she chose to represent Portugal, because she also has a Portuguese citizenship. She competed at World Challenge Cup in Cluj-Napoca, and ended on 49th place in all-around.

In 2026, she competed at Tashkent World Cup and took 58th place in all-around.

In September 2026, Gyulai won the senior all-around at the international Óbuda Cup in Budapest, scoring 71.634 points ahead of Austria's Serafyma Sytnikova and Hungary's Laura Léna Ötvös.
