= Shai Ben Ruby =

Israeli rhythmic gymnast

- שי בן רובי
- Born: February 25, 2002 (age 24) Israel

Gymnastics career
- Discipline: Rhythmic gymnastics
- Country represented: Israel
- Head coach: Ira Vigdorchik
- Assistant coach: Rahel Vigdorchik
- Choreographer: Rahel Vigdorchik
- Retired: 14 July 2021
Medal record
Representing Israel
Rhythmic gymnastics
European Championships
Gold medal – first place	2020 Kyiv	Group All-around
Silver medal – second place	2020 Kyiv	Team
Silver medal – second place	2020 Kyiv	5 Balls
Bronze medal – third place	2020 Kyiv	Group All-around
Junior European Championships
Bronze medal – third place	2017 Budapest	10 Clubs

Shai Ben Ruby (Hebrew: שי בן רובי; born February 25, 2002, in Israel) is an Israeli retired individual and group rhythmic gymnast. She is the 2020 European Group All-around champion.

== Rhythmic gymnastics career ==
=== Junior ===
In 2017, she joined Israeli junior group and competed at International Tournament Alina Cup in Moscow, where they took silver medal in Group All-around behind Russia. At the 2017 Junior European Championships in Budapest, Hungary they won silver medal in 10 Clubs final.

=== Senior ===
In 2018, she became senior and joined Israeli senior group. She made her World Championship debut at the 2018 World Championships in Sofia, Bulgaria, where she placed 15th in Group All-around. Her second World Championships participation was in 2019 in Baku, where she and her teammates placed 6th in Group All-around, 4th in 5 Balls final and 6th in 3 Hoops + 4 Clubs. In November 2020, they won gold medal at the 2020 European Championships in Group All-around and silver in Team competition.

== See also ==
- List of medalists at the Rhythmic Gymnastics Junior European Championships
