= Maëna Millon =

French rhythmic gymnast

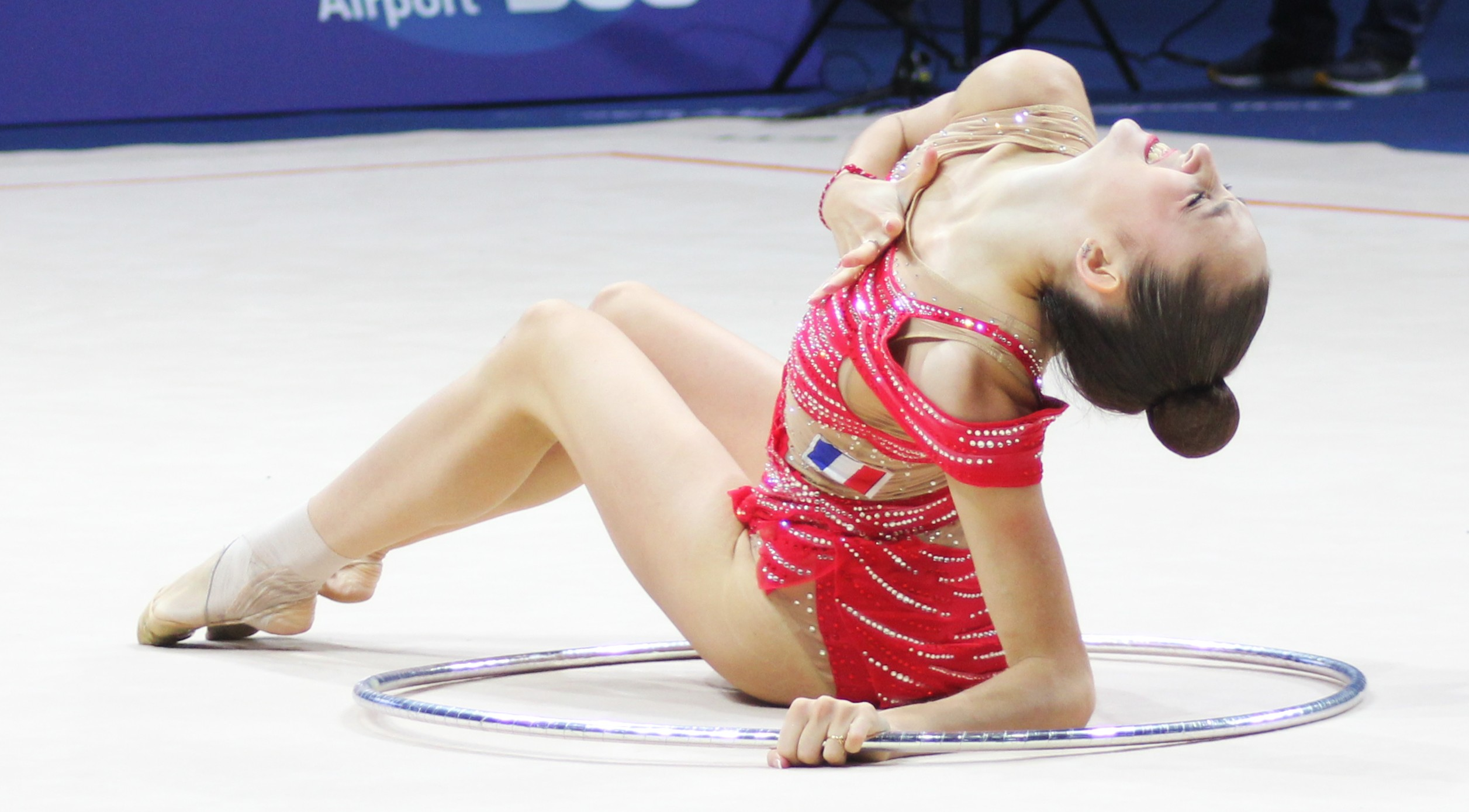
- Millon at the 2025 Summer World University Games

Personal information
- Born: 22 February 2003 (age 23) Chambray-lès-Tours, France

Gymnastics career
- Discipline: Rhythmic gymnastics
- Country represented: France; (2017-)
- Club: Societe Municipale d'Orleans Gymnastique
- Gym: Societe Municipale d'Orleans Gymnastique
- Head coach: Isabelle Andre
- Assistant coach: Snejana Mladenova

Maëna Millon (born 22 February 2003) is a French individual rhythmic gymnast. She is a two-time (2025, 2026) French National all-around champion.

== Career ==
Millon started rhythmic gymnastics at age 6 in Ligueil, France. Her idol is French rhythmic gymnast Eva Serrano.

=== Junior ===
In 2018, she won bronze medal in all-around at French National Championships and also won gold medal in ball, silver in ribbon and bronze in hoop. She represented France at the 2018 European Junior Championships in Guadalajara. Together with her teammates Manelle Inaho, Célia Joseph-Noël, Hélène Karbanov and senior group, she finished 8th in the team competition. She competed with ball (47th place) and ribbon (22nd place).

=== Senior ===
In 2019, she started competing as a senior. She debuted on international level at Baku World Cup, where she was 48th in all-around. Later, she competed at World Challenge Cup in Minsk, Belarus, where she ended on 33rd place in All-around. She won silver medal in all-around at French National Championships. In September, she and Valerie Romenski competed at the 2019 World Championships in Baku, Azerbaijan. Maena took 66th place in all-around qualifications and 17th place in team competition.

In 2020, Millon began experiencing persistent headaches that gradually worsened and affected her training. Her performance declined, prompting her coaches to ease her training load. Despite the pain, she continued to train daily and was later diagnosed with tension-type headaches. A new treatment helped her recover. As a result of her condition, she was not selected for the 2020 European Championships in Kyiv, Ukraine. After finishing last in the first selection test, she withdrew from the second to focus on recovery — a decision she later viewed as the right one, especially since France ultimately did not send any senior gymnasts.

In 2021, she was invited to a selection test at INSEP for the World Championships in Kitakyushu, Japan, but she was unable to participate due to a minor sprain and therefore did not make it to the team.

She returned to the international scene in 2024, competing at Grand Prix Marbella, where she took 25th place in the all-around.

In 2025, she began her season at the Sofia World Cup in April, where she took 37th place in the all-around. She was most successful with hoop (19th place). Then she competed at the Tashkent World Cup and took 25th place in the all-around and 15th with hoop. At the French National Championships in Paris, she won gold in the all-around in front of Lily Ramonatxo. In the finals, she won gold with hoop and silver in the clubs and ribbon finals. In June, Millon represented France together with Lily Ramonatxo at the 2025 European Championships in Tallinn, Estonia. She placed 16th in the all-around final. She and Ramonatxo took 8th place in the team competition together with the senior group. On 17-19 July, she took 17th place in the all-around at the 2025 Summer Universiade in Essen. She qualified to the hoop final, finishing 6th. In August, she represented France at the 2025 World Championships in Rio de Janeiro, Brazil. She ended on 44th place in all-around qualifications and 14th in team competition.

In 2026, she started the season at Sofia World Cup, and finished on 47th place in all-around. She made mistakes in three out of four routines, placing best with ball - 24th place. In June, Millon won gold medal in all-around at French National Championships. She took gold medals in hoop and ribbon finals, silver in clubs and bronze in ball final. In August, she was selected to represent France at the 2026 World Championships in Frankfurt, Germany. She took 34th place in all-around qualifications, achieving highest result with ball (23rd place). Afterwards, she was selected to represent France alongside Yseult Zavagno at the 2026 Mediterranean Games in Taranto, Italy. She ended on 5th place in all-around final.

== Routine music information ==
Year	Apparatus	Music title
2026	Hoop	You Are My Destiny by Paul Anka feat. Il Divo
2026	Ball	Stranger by Dimash Kudaybergen, Igor Krutoy
2026	Clubs	Kashmir by Jimmy Page, Robert Plant
2026	Ribbon	Road to Hell by André De Shields (Hadestown Original Broadway Company)
2025	Hoop	You Are My Destiny by Paul Anka feat. Il Divo
2025	Ball	La Despedida by Cami
2025	Clubs	Lose Control by Teddy Swims
2025	Ribbon	Mon amie la rose by Slimane, Lina El Arabi
2024	Hoop	Mi Amor - Libertango by Vincent Niclo
2024	Ball	Chainsmoking by Jacob Banks
2024	Clubs	Kiss by Prince
2024	Ribbon	The Land Of Spice by Taraana
2022/2023	Hoop	Forsaken by Peter Crowley
2022/2023	Ball	Belle by Garou, Daniel Lavoie & Patrick Fiori
2022/2023	Clubs	Be My Lover by La Bouche
2022/2023	Ribbon	Raise Vibration by Lenny Kravitz
2020/2021	Hoop	Eye of the Tiger (Cover) by 2Cellos
2020/2021	Ball	Prelude to an end by Mystery of Bulgarian Voices
2020/2021	Clubs	Bensonhurst Blues by Oscar Benton
2020/2021	Ribbon	Carmen Fantasie by David Garrett
2019	Hoop	Eye of the Tiger (Cover) by 2Cellos
2019	Ball	Prelude to an end by Mystery of Bulgarian Voices
2019	Clubs	Soul Man by Pitingo feat. Sam Moore
2019	Ribbon	Carmen Fantasie by David Garrett
2018	Hoop	Paint It Black (Cover)
2018	Ball	Unchain My Heart by Joe Cocker
2018	Clubs	
2018	Ribbon	Westside Story Prologue by Columbia Studio Orchestra
