= 2021 Rhythmic Gymnastics European Championships =

- Venue: Palace of Culture and Sports
- Location: Varna, Bulgaria
- Start date: 9 June 2021
- End date: 13 June 2021

The 2021 Rhythmic Gymnastics European Championships was the 37th edition of the Rhythmic Gymnastics European Championships, which took place on 9–13 June 2021 at the Palace of Culture and Sports in Varna, Bulgaria. This was the first year that Bulgaria hosted the European Championships.

The event was the last chance for European gymnasts to qualify a quota to compete at the delayed 2020 Summer Olympics, with one individual quota and one group quota available. It also, for the first time, served as a qualification event for country quotas at the 2021 World Championships. The Olympic quotas were won by Fanni Pigniczki and the group representing Ukraine.

Due to the ongoing COVID-19 pandemic, all persons involved in the event were required to undergo tests for Covid, and the arena was restricted to 50 percent of its total capacity.

Russian gymnasts dominated the event, winning over a third of the available medals and nine of the twelve titles. Arina Averina won the all-around, her second European title after the 2018 European Championships, and was joined on the podium by her twin sister, Dina Averina, who won bronze and also won three of the apparatus finals. The silver medalist, Boryana Kaleyn, won Bulgaria's first European all-around medal in more than twenty years, since Maria Petrova won the 1994 European Championships. The previous year's European champion, Linoy Ashram, was in fourth place in the all-around but won the clubs final, the first time since the 2011 European Championships that a non-Russian gymnast won a European apparatus final.

Rachel Stoyanov, representing North Macedonia, won the "Shooting Star" award.

== Entrants and event format ==
Each member nation of European Gymnastics could send either two or three individual gymnasts, who could perform a maximum of eight routines between them in the qualification round; a gymnast's three highest scores were used to determine qualification to the all-around final. The eight gymnasts (maximum two per country) with the highest scores per apparatus in the qualification round advanced to the apparatus final. Each member nation could also send a senior and a junior group. Each country's senior entrants formed a team, with the scores of all individual and group routines in the qualification round being added to determine team rankings.

37 countries entered 321 gymnasts in the competition. The countries participating in the competition were:

- Armenia
- Austria
- Azerbaijan
- Bosnia and Herzegovina
- Belarus
- Bulgaria
- Croatia
- Cyprus
- Czech Republic
- Estonia
- Finland
- France
- Great Britain
- Georgia
- Germany
- Greece
- Hungary
- Israel
- Italy
- Latvia
- Lithuania
- Luxembourg
- Moldova
- North Macedonia
- Norway
- Poland
- Portugal
- Romania
- Russia
- Slovenia
- San Marino
- Serbia
- Slovakia
- Spain
- Switzerland
- Turkey
- Ukraine

== Competition schedule ==
- Wednesday June 9
  - 10:00–11:40 Junior groups qualification & AA ranking (5 Balls, 5 Ribbons – SET A 1-12)
  - 11:55–13:35 Junior groups qualification & AA ranking (5 Balls, 5 Ribbons – SET B 13-24)
  - 18:30–19:00 Opening Ceremony
  - 19:00–19:40 Junior groups 5 Balls Final
  - 19:55–20:35 Junior groups 5 Ribbons Final
  - 20:35–20:50 Award ceremony Junior groups All-Around
  - 20:50–21:05 Award ceremony Junior groups Apparatus Final
- Thursday June 10
  - 10:00–12:00 Set A Senior Individuals qualifications (hoop & ball)
  - 12:15–14:15 Set B Senior Individuals qualifications (hoop & ball)
  - 15:15–17:15 Set C Senior Individuals qualifications (hoop & ball)
  - 17:30–19:30 Set D Senior Individuals qualifications (hoop & ball)
- Friday June 11
  - 10:00–12:00 Set C Senior Individuals qualifications (clubs & ribbon)
  - 12:15–14:15 Set D Senior Individuals qualifications (clubs & ribbon)
  - 15:15-17:15 Set A Senior Individuals qualifications (clubs & ribbon)
  - 17:30–19:30 Set B Senior Individuals qualifications (clubs & ribbon)
- Saturday June 12
  - 10:00–12:25 Senior Individuals AA Final (hoop, ball, clubs, ribbon – SET A)
  - 12:40–15:05 Senior Individuals AA Final (hoop, ball, clubs, ribbon –SET B)
  - 15:05–15:20 Award Ceremony AA Seniors Individuals
  - 16:30-18:00 Senior Groups (5 balls and 3 hoops & 2 pairs of clubs – SET A)
  - 18:15–19:40 Senior Groups (5 balls and 3 hoops & 2 pairs of clubs – SET B)
  - 19:40–19:55 Award Ceremony AA Senior Groups
  - 19:55–20:10 Award Ceremony Team (Senior Individuals and Senior Groups)
- Sunday June 13
  - 10:00–11:05 Senior Individuals Hoop & Ball Finals
  - 11:10–12:15 Senior Individuals Clubs & Ribbon Finals
  - 12:15-12:30 Award Ceremony Senior Individual Apparatus finals
  - 13:00–13:40 Senior Groups 5 Balls Final
  - 13:45–14:25 Senior Groups 3 Hoops + 4 Clubs Final
  - 14:25–15:00 Award Ceremony Senior Groups Apparatus finals

== Medal winners ==
Event	Gold	Silver	Bronze
Team
Team	Russia; Senior Individual; Dina Averina; Arina Averina; Lala Kramarenko; Senior Group; Anastasia Bliznyuk; Anastasiia Maksimova; Angelina Shkatova; Anastasiia Tatareva; Karina Metelkova; Olga Karaseva	Belarus; Senior Individual; Alina Harnasko; Anastasiia Salos; Senior Group; Arina Tsitsilina; Hanna Haidukevich; Anastasiya Malakanava; Anastasiya Rybakova; Hanna Shvaiba; Karyna Yarmolenka	Israel; Senior Individual; Linoy Ashram; Nicol Zelikman; Senior Group; Karin Vexman; Yuliana Telegina; Yana Kramarenko; Ofir Dayan; Natalie Raits
Senior Individual Finals
All-Around	Arina Averina; Russia	Boryana Kaleyn; Bulgaria	Dina Averina; Russia
Hoop	Dina Averina; Russia	Linoy Ashram; Israel	Anastasiia Salos; Belarus
Ball	Dina Averina; Russia	Linoy Ashram; Israel	Alina Harnasko; Belarus
Clubs	Linoy Ashram; Israel	Dina Averina; Russia	Anastasiia Salos; Belarus
Ribbon	Dina Averina; Russia	Alina Harnasko; Belarus	Arina Averina; Russia
Senior Group Finals
All-Around	Russia; Anastasia Bliznyuk; Olga Karaseva; Anastasiia Maksimova; Angelina Shkatova; Anastasiia Tatareva; Karina Metelkova	Italy; Alessia Maurelli; Martina Centofanti; Agnese Duranti; Martina Santandrea; Daniela Mogurean	Israel; Yana Kramarenko; Yuliana Telegina; Karin Vexman; Ofir Dayan; Natalie Raits
5 Balls	Bulgaria; Simona Dyankova; Laura Traets; Madlen Radukanova; Stefani Kiryakova; Erika Zafirova	Russia; Anastasia Bliznyuk; Olga Karaseva; Anastasiia Maksimova; Angelina Shkatova; Anastasiia Tatareva; Karina Metelkova	Israel; Yana Kramarenko; Yuliana Telegina; Karin Vexman; Ofir Dayan; Natalie Raits
3 Hoops + 4 Clubs	Israel; Yana Kramarenko; Yuliana Telegina; Karin Vexman; Ofir Dayan; Natalie Raits	Bulgaria; Simona Dyankova; Laura Traets; Madlen Radukanova; Stefani Kiryakova; Erika Zafirova	Italy; Alessia Maurelli; Martina Centofanti; Agnese Duranti; Martina Santandrea; Daniela Mogurean
Junior Group Finals
All-Around	Russia; Milena An; Mariia Fedorovtseva; Anna Grosh; Sofiia Iakovleva; Nonna Nianina; Elizaveta Tataeva	Bulgaria; Kristiana Doycheva; Kamelia Petrova; Suzan Pouladian; Maria Stamenova; Gergana Trendafilova; Aleksandra Vasileva	Israel; Shani Bakanov; Eliza Banchuk; Alona Hillel; Emili Malka; Simona Rudnik
5 Balls	Russia; Milena An; Mariia Fedorovtseva; Anna Grosh; Sofiia Iakovleva; Nonna Nianina; Elizaveta Tataeva	Bulgaria; Kristiana Doycheva; Kamelia Petrova; Suzan Pouladian; Maria Stamenova; Gergana Trendafilova; Aleksandra Vasileva	Belarus; Palina Aliaksandrava; Antanina Katulina; Palina Slancheuskaya; Kseniya Svirskaya; Varvara Yushko; Daria Vyshnikova
5 Ribbons	Russia; Milena An; Mariia Fedorovtseva; Anna Grosh; Sofiia Iakovleva; Nonna Nianina; Elizaveta Tataeva	Bulgaria; Kristiana Doycheva; Kamelia Petrova; Suzan Pouladian; Maria Stamenova; Gergana Trendafilova; Aleksandra Vasileva	Israel; Shani Bakanov; Eliza Banchuk; Alona Hillel; Emili Malka; Simona Rudnik

== Results ==
=== Team ===
Rank	Nation	Hoop (rhythmic gymnastics)	Ball (rhythmic gymnastics)	Clubs (rhythmic gymnastics)	Ribbon (rhythmic gymnastics)	5	3, 2	Total
1st place, gold medalist(s)	Russia	55.600	56.975	54.100	48.250	46.250	44.000	305.675
2nd place, silver medalist(s)	Belarus	52.400	53.650	54.300	43.675	46.100	40.450	290.575
3rd place, bronze medalist(s)	Israel	47.300	53.900	52.100	45.950	45.550	41.850	286.650
4	Bulgaria	49.850	52.650	51.350	43.200	46.000	40.200	283.250
5	Ukraine	47.900	47.500	48.050	41.200	45.100	39.450	269.200
6	Italy	43.900	45.550	51.100	38.200	45.100	42.350	266.200
7	Azerbaijan	46.050	44.200	49.250	41.100	41.750	40.475	262.825
8	Spain	45.200	48.200	47.400	32.650	40.550	40.300	254.300
9	Hungary	45.050	46.050	46.300	38.350	36.900	36.950	249.600
10	Greece	43.325	46.500	43.450	40.500	38.650	36.350	248.775
11	France	42.400	45.300	44.750	40.650	33.800	36.850	243.750
12	Estonia	41.000	45.300	43.450	39.400	36.000	36.750	241.900
13	Germany	42.475	43.600	42.800	36.325	34.100	38.250	237.550
14	Turkey	40.200	39.425	42.600	28.750	33.800	38.400	223.175
15	Finland	35.250	40.450	38.200	33.550	34.350	37.925	219.725
16	Austria	40.250	40.300	38.050	29.325	28.250	27.950	204.125
17	Great Britain	36.850	32.700	40.350	38.550	21.550	27.950	187.950

=== Senior Individual ===
==== All-Around ====
Rank	Gymnast	Nation	Hoop (rhythmic gymnastics)	Ball (rhythmic gymnastics)	Clubs (rhythmic gymnastics)	Ribbon (rhythmic gymnastics)	Total
1st place, gold medalist(s)	Arina Averina	Russia	26.200 (6)	29.200 (1)	28.400 (2)	25.300 (1)	109.100
2nd place, silver medalist(s)	Boryana Kaleyn	Bulgaria	27.775 (2)	27.400 (4)	27.950 (3)	24.500 (3)	107.625
3rd place, bronze medalist(s)	Dina Averina	Russia	28.000 (1)	29.150 (2)	27.500 (4)	22.675 (7)	107.325
4	Linoy Ashram	Israel	27.450 (3)	28.300 (3)	28.450 (1)	22.600 (8)	106.800
5	Anastasiia Salos	Belarus	26.900 (5)	25.900 (6)	27.150 (5)	24.525 (2)	104.475
6	Alina Harnasko	Belarus	27.100 (4)	25.500 (10)	26.500 (6)	23.700 (4)	102.800
7	Katrin Taseva	Bulgaria	24.800 (9)	25.900 (6)	25.700 (9)	22.450	98.850
8	Sofia Raffaeli	Italy	22.950	26.400 (5)	26.400 (7)	23.000 (5)	98.750
9	Nicol Zelikman	Israel	25.150 (7)	25.775 (8)	25.850 (8)	21.600	98.375
10	Fanni Pigniczki	Hungary	24.550	25.000	25.400	22.300	97.250
11	Viktoriia Onopriienko	Ukraine	25.150 (7)	25.550 (9)	24.800	21.400	96.900
12	Ekaterina Vedeneeva	Slovenia	24.650	24.400	25.650 (10)	22.050	96.750
13	Vlada Nikolchenko	Ukraine	24.725 (10)	24.000	23.700	22.900 (6)	95.325
14	Andreea Verdes	Romania	24.600	24.500	25.400	19.900	94.400
15	Polina Berezina	Spain	23.550	24.650	22.500	22.550 (10)	93.250
16	Zohra Aghamirova	Azerbaijan	23.550	24.650	22.500	22.550 (10)	93.250
17	Arzu Jalilova	Azerbaijan	23.750	23.950	24.100	20.700	92.500
18	Eleni Kelaiditi	Greece	21.300	24.925	23.950	22.050	92.225
19	Natalia Garcia	Spain	23.600	24.400	23.550	19.650	91.200
20	Salome Pazhava	Georgia	23.100	21.075	25.150	21.400	90.725
21	Kseniya Moustafaeva	France	23.350	23.300	23.700	19.375	89.725
22	Viktoria Bogdanova	Estonia	23.300	22.100	21.650	21.300	88.350
23	Rachel Stoyanov	North Macedonia	24.450	20.950	22.050	20.300	87.750
24	Margarita Kolosov	Germany	20.900	23.325	23.300	19.600	87.125

==== Hoop ====
Rank	Gymnast	Nation	D Score	E Score	Pen.	Total
1st place, gold medalist(s)	Dina Averina	Russia	19.1	9.250		28.350
2nd place, silver medalist(s)	Linoy Ashram	Israel	18.6	9.250		27.850
3rd place, bronze medalist(s)	Anastasiia Salos	Belarus	18.5	9.150		27.650
4	Alina Harnasko	Belarus	18.1	9.000		27.100
5	Lala Kramarenko	Russia	17.5	9.300		26.800
6	Katrin Taseva	Bulgaria	17.7	8.900		26.600
7	Boryana Kaleyn	Bulgaria	17.8	8.800		26.600
8	Viktoriia Onopriienko	Ukraine	15.5	8.650		24.150

==== Ball ====
Rank	Gymnast	Nation	D Score	E Score	Pen.	Total
1st place, gold medalist(s)	Dina Averina	Russia	19.6	9.250		28.850
2nd place, silver medalist(s)	Linoy Ashram	Israel	19.2	9.400		28.600
3rd place, bronze medalist(s)	Alina Harnasko	Belarus	19.2	9.300		28.500
4	Arina Averina	Russia	19.0	9.200		28.200
5	Nicol Zelikman	Israel	17.8	8.975		26.775
6	Boryana Kaleyn	Bulgaria	18.0	8.350		26.350
7	Katrin Taseva	Bulgaria	17.1	8.950		26.050
8	Anastasiia Salos	Belarus	17.0	7.950		24.950

==== Clubs ====
Rank	Gymnast	Nation	D Score	E Score	Pen.	Total
1st place, gold medalist(s)	Linoy Ashram	Israel	19.3	9.200		28.500
2nd place, silver medalist(s)	Dina Averina	Russia	19.0	9.200		28.200
3rd place, bronze medalist(s)	Anastasiia Salos	Belarus	18.8	9.000		27.800
4	Boryana Kaleyn	Bulgaria	18.8	8.975		27.775
5	Katrin Taseva	Bulgaria	19.1	8.400		27.500
6	Alina Harnasko	Belarus	18.2	8.300		26.500
7	Viktoriia Onopriienko	Ukraine	17.8	8.400		26.200
8	Sofia Raffaeli	Italy	16.2	8.100		24.300

==== Ribbon ====
Rank	Gymnast	Nation	D Score	E Score	Pen.	Total
1st place, gold medalist(s)	Dina Averina	Russia	15.4	9.300		24.700
2nd place, silver medalist(s)	Alina Harnasko	Belarus	14.3	8.900		23.200
3rd place, bronze medalist(s)	Arina Averina	Russia	14.8	7.800		22.600
4	Linoy Ashram	Israel	14.1	8.475		22.575
5	Katrin Taseva	Bulgaria	14.4	7.700		22.100
6	Khrystyna Pohranychna	Ukraine	13.5	8.500		22.000
7	Anastasiia Salos	Belarus	13.8	7.500		21.300
8	Nicol Zelikman	Israel	12.5	7.500		20.000

=== Junior Group ===
==== All-Around ====
Rank	Nation	5	5	Total
1st place, gold medalist(s)	Russia	40.500	27.300	67.800
2nd place, silver medalist(s)	Bulgaria	38.250	27.200	65.450
3rd place, bronze medalist(s)	Israel	37.000	26.175	63.175
4	Italy	35.650	27.100	62.750
5	Belarus	38.300	22.575	60.875
6	Ukraine	34.950	23.750	58.700
7	Hungary	31.625	23.850	55.475
8	Poland	31.650	23.550	55.200
9	Spain	32.600	21.950	54.550
10	Estonia	32.650	20.700	53.350
11	Greece	30.650	22.500	53.150
12	Romania	27.900	21.050	48.950
13	Germany	31.400	16.600	48.000
14	Slovakia	30.850	17.050	47.900
15	Austria	27.100	18.725	45.825
16	Switzerland	26.700	18.500	45.200
17	Georgia	28.550	16.350	44.900
18	Czech Republic	25.650	15.500	41.150
19	Finland	24.575	11.450	36.025
20	Norway	19.650	10.850	30.500

==== 5 Balls ====
Rank	Nation	D Score	E Score	Pen.	Total
1st place, gold medalist(s)	Russia	31.6	8.800	0.000	40.400
2nd place, silver medalist(s)	Bulgaria	30.3	8.750	0.050	39.000
3rd place, bronze medalist(s)	Belarus	29.7	7.850	0.000	37.550
4	Israel	28.1	8.100	0.050	36.150
5	Ukraine	27.4	7.600	0.000	35.000
6	Estonia	26.1	6.950	0.000	33.050
7	Italy	26.7	6.600	0.300	33.000
8	Spain	24.1	6.200	0.050	30.250

==== 5 Ribbons ====
Rank	Nation	D Score	E Score	Pen.	Total
1st place, gold medalist(s)	Russia	21.7	8.300	0.000	30.000
2nd place, silver medalist(s)	Bulgaria	20.4	8.400	0.000	28.800
3rd place, bronze medalist(s)	Israel	20.4	8.250	0.000	28.650
4	Belarus	19.7	6.800	0.000	26.500
5	Ukraine	19.3	6.300	0.000	25.600
6	Hungary	17.6	6.650	0.000	24.250
7	Italy	17.3	5.800	0.000	23.100
8	Poland	17.2	6.100	0.300	23.000

=== Senior Group ===
==== All-Around ====
Rank	Nation	5	3, 2	Total
1st place, gold medalist(s)	Russia	46.250	44.000	90.250
2nd place, silver medalist(s)	Italy	45.100	42.350	87.450
3rd place, bronze medalist(s)	Israel	45.550	41.850	87.400
4	Belarus	46.100	40.450	86.550
5	Bulgaria	46.000	40.200	86.200
6	Ukraine	45.100	39.450	84.550
7	Azerbaijan	41.750	40.475	82.225
8	Spain	40.550	40.300	80.850
9	Greece	38.650	36.350	75.000
10	Hungary	36.900	36.950	73.850
11	Estonia	36.000	36.750	72.750
12	Germany	34.100	38.250	72.350
13	Finland	34.350	37.925	72.275
14	Turkey	33.800	38.400	72.200
15	France	33.800	36.850	70.650
16	Austria	28.250	27.950	56.200
17	Great Britain	21.550	27.950	49.500
18	Slovakia	23.600	24.150	47.750

==== 5 Balls ====
Rank	Nation	D Score	E Score	Pen.	Total
1st place, gold medalist(s)	Bulgaria	38.6	8.900	0.000	47.500
2nd place, silver medalist(s)	Russia	38.5	8.775	0.000	47.275
3rd place, bronze medalist(s)	Israel	37.6	8.550	0.000	46.150
4	Belarus	36.3	7.825	0.000	44.125
5	Italy	36.4	7.700	0.000	44.100
6	Azerbaijan	35.5	8.200	0.000	43.700
7	Ukraine	36.0	7.500	0.050	43.450
8	Spain	33.9	7.750	0.000	41.650

==== 3 Hoops + 4 Clubs ====
Rank	Nation	D Score	E Score	Pen.	Total
1st place, gold medalist(s)	Israel	37.3	8.850	0.000	46.150
2nd place, silver medalist(s)	Bulgaria	36.9	9.050	0.000	45.950
3rd place, bronze medalist(s)	Italy	34.8	8.575	0.000	43.375
4	Azerbaijan	33.5	8.250	0.000	41.750
5	Russia	33.4	7.450	0.300	40.550
6	Ukraine	32.4	7.600	0.000	40.000
7	Spain	31.7	6.350	0.000	38.050
8	Belarus	31.5	6.800	0.300	38.000

== Medal count ==
* Host nation (Bulgaria)

Rank	Nation	Gold	Silver	Bronze	Total
1	Russia	9	2	2	13
2	Israel	2	2	5	9
3	Bulgaria*	1	5	0	6
4	Belarus	0	2	4	6
5	Italy	0	1	1	2
Totals (5 entries)		12	12	12	36
