= Karina Sydorak =

Ukrainian rhythmic gymnast (born 2006)

- Born: 13 September 2006 (age 19) Lviv, Ukraine

Gymnastics career
- Discipline: Rhythmic gymnastics
- Country represented: Ukraine (2020-)
- Club: Deriugina School
- Head coaches: Kateryna Sorokovska, Iryna Ivaniv
Medal record
European Championships
Gold medal – first place	2020 Kyiv	Team
Silver medal – second place	2020 Kyiv	Ribbon

Karina Sydorak (Ukrainian: Каріна Сидорак; born 2006) is a Ukrainian female rhythmic gymnast. She is the 2020 Junior European champion with Ball.

== Career ==
=== Junior ===
She won bronze medal in Team competition at the 2020 Deriugina Cup. She competed at the 2020 Junior European Championships and won gold medal in Team competition. She also qualified to Ribbon final and won another gold medal. In 2021, she joined national junior group that competed at international competitions. They took 6th place in Group All-around at the 2021 European Championships in Varna, Bulgaria and advanced in both Apparatus finals, where they placed 5th.

== See also ==
- List of medalists at the Rhythmic Gymnastics Junior European Championships
