= 2020 Rhythmic Gymnastics European Championships =

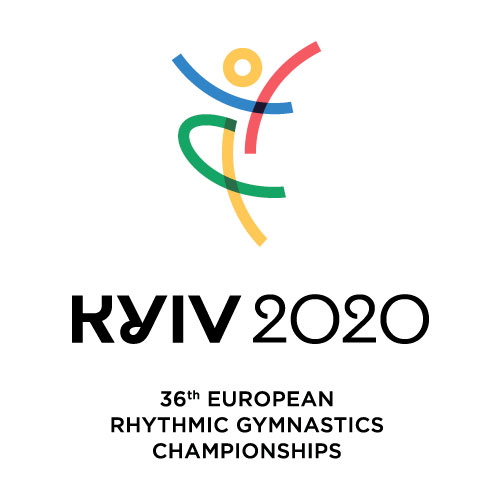
- Venue: Palace of Sports
- Location: Kyiv, Ukraine
- Start date: 26 November 2020
- End date: 29 November 2020

The 2020 Rhythmic Gymnastics European Championships is the 36th edition of the Rhythmic Gymnastics European Championships, which took place on 26–29 November 2020 at the Palace of Sports in Kyiv, Ukraine. Because of the COVID-19 pandemic, many competitors withdrew from the competition, such as Russia, Italy, and the Belarusian and Bulgarian groups.

== Participating countries ==
- Andorra (2)
- Azerbaijan (11)
- Belgium (1)
- Bosnia and Herzegovina (5)
- Belarus (5)
- Bulgaria (4)
- Croatia (4)
- Czech Republic (5)
- Estonia (8)
- France (7)
- Hungary (4)
- Israel (10)
- Latvia (5)
- Lithuania (3)
- Luxembourg (2)
- Moldova (3)
- North Macedonia (1)
- Montenegro (2)
- Romania (4)
- Slovenia (4)
- Serbia (2)
- Turkey (10)
- Ukraine (12)

Updated on November 22nd 2020.

== Competition schedule ==
- Thursday November 26
  - 11:00-13:30 CI juniors individual rope and ball Set A + B
  - 13:45-15:25 CI juniors individual rope and ball Set C
  - 16:30-17:15 CI senior groups 5 balls
  - 17:30–18:30 Opening Ceremony
- Friday November 27
  - 12:00–13:40 CI juniors individual clubs and ribbon Set C
  - 13:55–16:25 CI juniors individual clubs and ribbon Set A + B
  - 17:30–18:15 CI senior groups 3 hoops 4 clubs
  - 18:15–18:30 Award Ceremony – Team Competition
  - 18:30–18:45 Award Ceremony – Senior groups all around
- Saturday November 28
  - 13:00-14:10 CII Apparatus finals juniors rope and ball
  - 14:15-15:25 CII Apparatus finals juniors clubs and ribbon
  - 15:25-15:45 Award Ceremony – Juniors finals
  - 16:00-16:45 CII senior groups finals 5 balls
  - 17:00-17:45 CII senior groups finals 3 hoops and 4 clubs
  - 17:45-18:00 CII Award Ceremony – Senior group finals
- Sunday November 29
  - 11:45-13:15 CIII senior individuals set C + D (4 apparatus)
  - 14:00-15:30 CIII senior individuals set B + A (2 apparatus)
  - 15:45-17:15 CIII senior individuals Set B + A (2 apparatus)
  - 17:20-17:30 Award Ceremony – Senior individuals
  - 17:30-18:00 Closing Ceremony

== Medal winners ==
Event	Gold	Silver	Bronze
Team
Team	Ukraine; Junior Individual; Polina Karika; Karina Sydorak; Melaniia Tur; Senior Group; Diana Baieva; Mariola Bodnarchuk; Anastasiya Voznyak; Mariia Vysochanska; Valeriya Yuzviak	Israel; Junior Individual; Daria Atamanov; Alona Hillel; Senior Group; Shai Ben Ruby; Ofir Dayan; Yana Kramarenko; Bar Shapochnikov; Yuliana Telegina; Karin Vexman	Azerbaijan; Junior Individual; Narmin Bayramova; Leyli Aghazada; Alina Gozalova; Ilona Zeynalova; Senior Group; Laman Alimuradova; Zeynab Hummatova; Yelyzaveta Luzan; Maryam Safarova; Darya Sorokina
Senior Individual Finals
All-around	Linoy Ashram; Israel	Alina Harnasko; Belarus	Anastasiia Salos; Belarus
Senior Group Finals
All-around	Israel; Shai Ben Ruby; Ofir Dayan; Yana Kramarenko; Bar Shapochnikov; Yuliana Telegina; Karin Vexman	Azerbaijan; Laman Alimuradova; Zeynab Hummatova; Yelyzaveta Luzan; Maryam Safarova; Darya Sorokina	Ukraine; Diana Baieva; Mariola Bodnarchuk; Anastasiya Voznyak; Mariia Vysochanska; Valeriya Yuzviak
5 Balls	Ukraine; Diana Baieva; Mariola Bodnarchuk; Anastasiya Voznyak; Mariia Vysochanska; Valeriya Yuzviak	Israel; Shai Ben Ruby; Ofir Dayan; Yana Kramarenko; Bar Shapochnikov; Yuliana Telegina; Karin Vexman	Estonia; Laurabell Kabrits; Evelin Naptal; Arina Okamanchuk; Carmely Reiska; Alina Vesselova
3 Hoops + 4 Clubs	Turkey; Azra Akıncı; Eda Asar; Peri Berker; Duygu Doğan; Nil Karabina	Ukraine; Diana Baieva; Mariola Bodnarchuk; Anastasiya Voznyak; Mariia Vysochanska; Valeriya Yuzviak	Azerbaijan; Laman Alimuradova; Zeynab Hummatova; Yelyzaveta Luzan; Maryam Safarova; Darya Sorokina
Junior Finals
Rope	Dina Agisheva; Belarus	Daria Atamanov; Israel	Eva Brezalieva; Bulgaria
Ball	Polina Karika; Ukraine	Stiliana Nikolova; Bulgaria	Yelyzaveta Zorkina; Belarus
Clubs	Daria Atamanov; Israel	Yelyzaveta Zorkina; Belarus	Evelin Viktória Kocsis; Hungary
Ribbon	Stiliana Nikolova; Bulgaria	Karina Sydorak; Ukraine	Daria Atamanov; Israel

== Results ==
=== Team ===
Rank	Nation	Rope (rhythmic gymnastics)	Ball (rhythmic gymnastics)	Clubs (rhythmic gymnastics)	Ribbon (rhythmic gymnastics)	5	3, 4	Total
1st place, gold medalist(s)	Ukraine	41.200	45.100	47.050	40.100	32.000	31.700	237.150
2nd place, silver medalist(s)	Israel	39.400	44.925	43.050	41.950	34.100	33.475	236.900
3rd place, bronze medalist(s)	Azerbaijan	38.200	40.100	42.700	38.875	34.600	31.700	226.175
4	France	36.600	38.600	40.950	36.000	29.250	29.625	211.025
5	Estonia	34.000	37.625	40.500	34.850	32.000	31.000	209.975
6	Turkey	31.200	35.650	37.950	31.150	31.900	28.300	196.150

=== Junior Individual ===
==== Rope ====
Rank	Gymnast	Nation	D Score	E Score	Pen.	Total
1st place, gold medalist(s)	Dina Agisheva	Belarus	12.8	8.750		21.550
2nd place, silver medalist(s)	Daria Atamanov	Israel	12.7	8.800		21.500
3rd place, bronze medalist(s)	Eva Brezalieva	Bulgaria	12.2	8.650		20.850
4	Karina Sydorak	Ukraine	12.2	8.600		20.800
5	Evelin Viktória Kocsis	Hungary	11.7	8.250		19.950
6	Narmin Bayramova	Azerbaijan	11.1	7.950		19.050
7	Lily Ramonatxo	France	10.9	8.050		18.950
8	Annaliese Dragan	Romania	10.5	8.250		18.750

==== Ball ====
Rank	Gymnast	Nation	D Score	E Score	Pen.	Total
1st place, gold medalist(s)	Polina Karika	Ukraine	14.1	8.750		22.850
2nd place, silver medalist(s)	Stiliana Nikolova	Bulgaria	14.1	8.700		22.800
3rd place, bronze medalist(s)	Yelyzaveta Zorkina	Belarus	13.6	8.600		22.200
4	Daria Atamanov	Israel	13.5	8.500		22.000
5	Alina Gozalova	Azerbaijan	12.5	8.550		21.050
6	Erika Dokutsajeva	Estonia	12.4	7.750		20.150
7	Evelin Viktória Kocsis	Hungary	12.7	6.900		19.600
8	Lily Ramonatxo	France	12.2	7.200		19.400

==== Clubs ====
Rank	Gymnast	Nation	D Score	E Score	Pen.	Total
1st place, gold medalist(s)	Daria Atamanov	Israel	15.4	8.950		24.350
2nd place, silver medalist(s)	Yelyzaveta Zorkina	Belarus	14.5	8.850		23.350
3rd place, bronze medalist(s)	Evelin Viktória Kocsis	Hungary	14.5	8.400		22.900
4	Eva Brezalieva	Bulgaria	14.0	8.750		22.750
5	Alina Gozalova	Azerbaijan	13.3	8.600		21.900
6	Melaniia Tur	Ukraine	13.5	7.600		21.100
7	Lily Ramonatxo	France	12.2	8.300		20.500
8	Annaliese Dragan	Romania	11.6	6.450		18.050

==== Ribbon ====
Rank	Gymnast	Nation	D Score	E Score	Pen.	Total
1st place, gold medalist(s)	Stiliana Nikolova	Bulgaria	12.8	8.750		21.550
2nd place, silver medalist(s)	Karina Sydorak	Ukraine	12.6	8.600		21.200
3rd place, bronze medalist(s)	Daria Atamanov	Israel	12.4	8.750		21.150
4	Narmin Bayramova	Azerbaijan	12.2	8.750		20.950
5	Dina Agisheva	Belarus	11.0	8.150		19.150
6	Annaliese Dragan	Romania	10.6	8.200		18.800
7	Elsa Somville	France	10.9	7.150		18.050
8	Anette Vaher	Estonia	8.9	7.400		16.300

=== Senior Individual ===
==== All-around ====
Rank	Gymnast	Nation	Hoop (rhythmic gymnastics)	Ball (rhythmic gymnastics)	Clubs (rhythmic gymnastics)	Ribbon (rhythmic gymnastics)	Total
1st place, gold medalist(s)	Linoy Ashram	Israel	26.500	25.450	26.200	22.750	100.900
2nd place, silver medalist(s)	Alina Harnasko	Belarus	25.350	26.000	26.550	23.000	100.900
3rd place, bronze medalist(s)	Anastasiia Salos	Belarus	25.350	24.450	24.750	21.950	96.500
4	Boryana Kaleyn	Bulgaria	24.000	25.250	23.200	22.850	95.300
5	Nicol Zelikman	Israel	24.600	23.900	24.000	22.100	94.600
6	Yeva Meleshchuk	Ukraine	22.900	24.850	24.100	21.600	93.450
7	Katrin Taseva	Bulgaria	25.050	23.200	22.100	21.800	92.150
8	Vlada Nikolchenko	Ukraine	24.700	23.650	22.750	18.900	90.000
9	Zohra Aghamirova	Azerbaijan	21.000	22.950	23.850	20.500	88.300
10	Andreea Verdes	Romania	23.500	22.200	21.500	20.850	88.050
11	Fanni Pigniczki	Hungary	20.950	22.450	23.100	21.150	87.650
12	Arzu Jalilova	Azerbaijan	23.500	21.500	22.150	20.450	87.600
13	Ekaterina Vedeneeva	Slovenia	20.700	21.600	22.500	21.900	86.700
14	Viktoria Bogdanova	Estonia	20.300	21.650	21.500	18.900	82.350
15	Jelizaveta Polstjanaja	Latvia	22.100	23.250	19.600	17.400	82.350
16	Rejchl Stojanov	North Macedonia	22.450	19.900	19.250	19.000	80.600
17	Kamelya Tuncel	Turkey	17.500	21.550	21.750	19.250	80.050
18	Sonia Ichim	Romania	19.900	20.200	19.950	19.300	79.350
19	Fausta Šostakaitė	Lithuania	17.700	16.200	18.950	17.050	69.900
20	Anastasia Guz	Moldova	19.350	16.000	17.600	16.650	69.600
21	Denisa Stepankova	Czech Republic	17.850	17.850	17.250	16.200	69.150
22	Elena Smirnova	Luxembourg	15.750	16.450	18.200	14.150	64.550
23	Lana Sambol	Croatia	15.600	15.600	15.700	13.750	60.650
24	Jovana Markovic	Montenegro	13.400	12.850	11.000	9.850	47.100
25	Hana Kahriman	Bosnia and Herzegovina	6.800	5.100	6.650	2.850	21.400

=== Senior Groups ===
==== Group all-around ====
Rank	Nation	5	3 4	Total
1st place, gold medalist(s)	Israel	34.100	33.475	67.575
2nd place, silver medalist(s)	Azerbaijan	34.600	31.700	66.300
3rd place, bronze medalist(s)	Ukraine	32.000	31.700	63.700
4	Estonia	32.000	31.000	63.000
5	Turkey	31.900	28.300	60.200
6	France	29.250	29.625	58.875

==== 5 Balls ====
Rank	Nation	D Score	E Score	Pen.	Total
1st place, gold medalist(s)	Ukraine	27.1	8.250	0.000	35.350
2nd place, silver medalist(s)	Israel	26.3	8.150	0.000	34.450
3rd place, bronze medalist(s)	Estonia	25.0	7.800	0.000	32.800
4	Azerbaijan	24.1	7.350	0.000	31.450
5	Turkey	21.6	5.900	0.000	27.500
6	France	20.6	5.700	0.300	26.000

==== 3 Hoops + 4 Clubs ====
Rank	Nation	D Score	E Score	Pen.	Total
1st place, gold medalist(s)	Turkey	24.0	7.150	0.000	31.150
2nd place, silver medalist(s)	Ukraine	24.0	7.150	0.000	31.150
3rd place, bronze medalist(s)	Azerbaijan	24.0	6.650	0.000	30.650
4	Israel	24.4	6.250	0.000	30.650
5	France	23.0	6.550	0.300	29.250
6	Estonia	19.8	5.750	0.300	25.250

== Medal count ==
Pos.	Country	Gold	Silver	Bronze	Total
1	Israel	3	3	1	7
2	Ukraine	3	2	1	6
3	Belarus	1	2	2	5
4	Bulgaria	1	1	1	3
5	Turkey	1	0	0	1
6	Azerbaijan	0	1	2	3
7	Hungary	0	0	1	1
7	Estonia	0	0	1	1
