= Duygu Doğan =

Turkish rhythmic gymnast

- Born: 28 May 2000 (age 26) Yenimahalle, Ankara, Turkey

Gymnastics career
- Discipline: Rhythmic gymnastics
- Country represented: Turkey
- Head coach: (Bulgaria) Kamelia Dunavska
- Assistant coach: Ülker Şule Bağışlayan
- Choreographer: Kamelia Dunavska
Medal record
Representing Turkey
Rhythmic gymnastics
European Championship
Gold medal – first place	2020 Kyiv	3 Hoops + 4 Clubs

Duygu Doğan (born 28 May 2000) is a Turkish female rhythmic gymnast. She won one gold medal in the 3 Hoops + 4 Clubs event at the 2020 Rhythmic Gymnastics European Championships held in Ukraine.

Born in Yenimahalle district of Ankara, Turkey on 28 May 2000, she graduated from Ankara University. In the national team, she is trained by head coach Kamelia Dunavska from Bulgaria, and her assistant Ülker Şule Bağışlayan. Doğan serves as captain of the national rhythmic gymnastics team.
