= Azra Akıncı =

Turkish rhythmic gymnast

- Born: May 28, 2003 (age 23) Antalya, Turkey

Gymnastics career
- Discipline: Rhythmic gymnastics
- Country represented: Turkey
- Head coach: Kamelia Dunavska
- Assistant coach: Ulker Sule Bagisliyan
- Choreographer: Kamelia Dunavska
Medal record
Representing Turkey
Rhythmic gymnastics
European Championship
Gold medal – first place	2020 Kyiv	3 Hoops + 4 Clubs

Azra Akıncı (born May 28, 2003) is a Turkish rhythmic gymnast. She won gold medal in the 3 Hoops + 4 Clubs event at the 2020 Rhythmic Gymnastics European Championships held in Kyiv, Ukraine.
