= Ilona Zeynalova =

Azerbaijani rhythmic gymnast

İlona Zeynalova
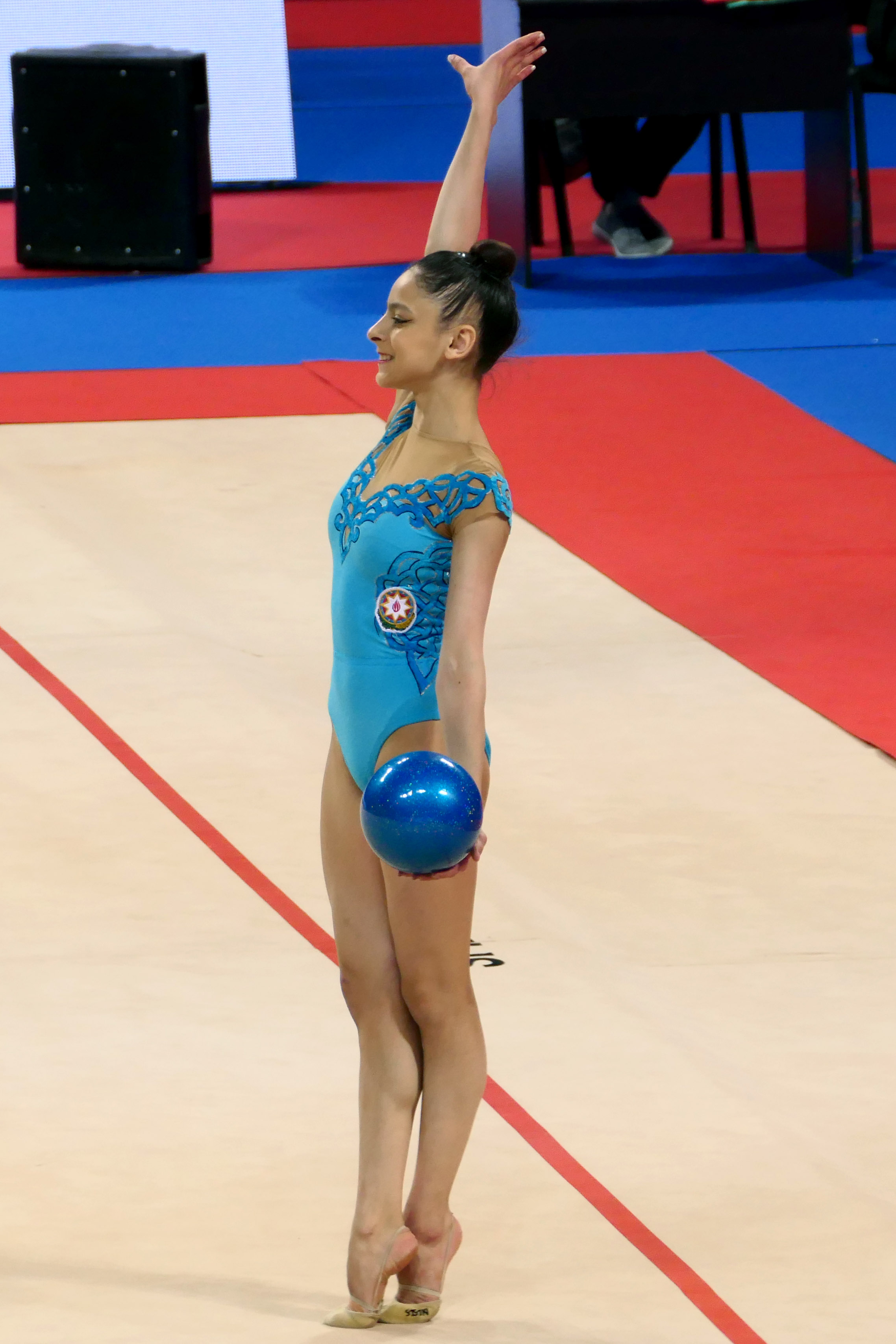
- Zeynalova in 2024

Personal information
- Born: 9 January 2005 (age 21) Azerbaijan

Gymnastics career
- Discipline: Rhythmic gymnastics
- Country represented: Azerbaijan (2020-)
- Club: Ojaq Sports Club
- Head coach: Mariana Vasileva
- Assistant coach: Yevgeniya Vilyayeva
Medal record
Representing Azerbaijan
Rhythmic Gymnastics
European Championships
Bronze medal – third place	2020 Kyiv	Team
Islamic Solidarity Games
Gold medal – first place	2021 Konya	Team

İlona Zeynalova (born 09 January 2005) is an Azeri rhythmic gymnast. She represents her country at international competitions.

== Career ==
Zeynalova made her international debut when she was selected to participate in the 2020 European Championships in Kyiv along with Narmin Bayramova, Leyli Aghazada, Alina Gozalova and the senior group. The Azerbaijani gymnasts won the bronze medal in the team category.

In 2022, Zeynalova started the season by participating at the World Cup in Tashkent. She ended 13th in the all-around, 8th with hoop, 13th with ball, 21st with clubs and 10th with ribbon. In May, she won the all-around gold and hoop final silver at the Irina Cup in Warsaw.

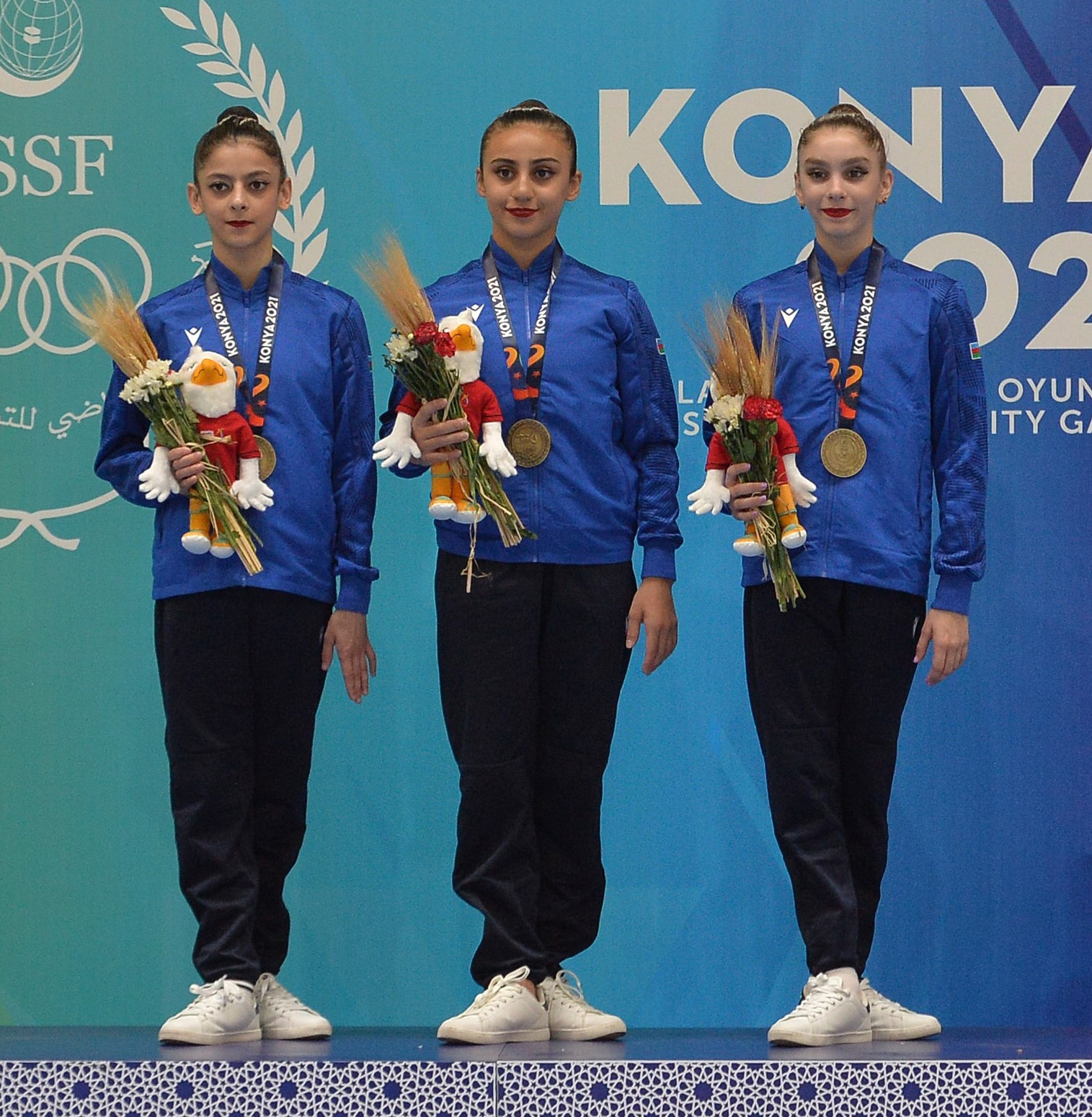
Zeynalova, left, at the Islamic Solidarity Games 2021

In August, Zeynalova competed at the 2021 Islamic Solidarity Games in Konya. The Azerbaijani group won the gold medal in the team competition. Later that month, she entered the World Challenge Cup in Cluj-Napoca, where she was 25th in the all-around, 32nd with hoop, 17th with ball, 21st with clubs and 29th with ribbon. In September, she was a member of the team that represented Azerbaijan at the World Championships in Sofia along with Zohra Aghamirova, Alina Gozalova and the senior group. There she competed with clubs and ribbon, finishing 32nd and 28th respectively.

In 2023, Zeynalova competed at the Summer University Games, where she came in 14th in the all-around. At the 2023 World Championships, she competed with three apparatuses and finished in 51st place.

Zeynalova competed at the 2024 World Cup in Sofia, where she placed 46th in the all-around.

== Routine music information ==
Year	Apparatus	Music Title
2024	Hoop	
2024	Ball	Balearic Cafe Chillout Island Lounge by The Guitar Del Mar
2024	Clubs	Tango Killah by Ghostwriter
2024	Ribbon	Titles Revisited by Danny Elfman
2023	Hoop	What a Wonderful World by 2WEI, Ali Christenhusz & Edda Hayes
2023	Ball	მახინჯი ვარ by Dato
2023	Clubs	
2023	Ribbon	
2022	Hoop	What a Wonderful World by 2WEI, Ali Christenhusz & Edda Hayes
2022	Ball	Bilməzdim by Flora Karimova
2022	Clubs	Bolero by David Garrett
2022	Ribbon	Men In Black by Hollywood Pictures Orchestra
2020	Rope	
2020	Ball	
2020	Clubs	Compassion by Ilya Beshevli
2020	Ribbon	Madame Papillon by René Aubry
