= Evelin Viktória Kocsis =

Hungarian rhythmic gymnast

- Born: 8 June 2006 (age 20) Budapest, Hungary

Gymnastics career
- Discipline: Rhythmic gymnastics
- Country represented: Hungary (2019-2022)
- Club: MTK Budapest
- Head coaches: Deutsch-Lazsányi Erika, Koch-Tiringer Tímea
Medal record
Representing Hungary
Rhythmic Gymnastics
Junior European Championships
Bronze medal – third place	2020 Kyiv	Clubs

Evelin Viktória Kocsis (born 8 June 2006) is a Hungarian rhythmic gymnast. She won the first European Championships medal for Hungary in rhythmic gymnastics.

== Career ==
Kocsis debuted internationally at the 1st Junior World Championships in Moscow, having suffered a foot fracture a few weeks prior, along with her teammates Szofia Bernat and Blanka Krasznay. She performed with ball and ribbon. She was 6th in teams and 13th with ball, and she reached the ribbon final, where she placed 6th.

In 2020, she competed with Eva Blanka Gyulai, Blanka Krasznay and senior Fanni Pigniczki at the European Championships in Kyiv. She finished 5th with rope, 7th with ball, and 28th with ribbon. In the clubs final, she won an historic bronze with a score of 22.900; she placed behind Daria Atamanov and Yelyzaveta Zorkina.

She took part in the two April stages of the 2022 World Cup series: in Sofia (5th in the all-around, 7th with hoop, 4th with ball, 14th with clubs and 8th with ribbon) and Baku (16th in the all-around, 23rd with hoop, 19th with ball, 8th with clubs and 31st with ribbon).

In 2024, several coaches, parents, and former athletes anonymously complained of abuse by coach Eriká Deutsch-Lazsányi. In May 2026, while the case was under investigation by the Gymnastics Ethics Foundation, Kocsis came forward as one of the athletes, alleging that she was constantly told she was overweight and that she had experienced stress fractures due to overtraining. Deutsch-Lazsányi denied the allegations.

== Achievements ==
- First Hungarian rhythmic gymnast to win a medal in an individual apparatus final at the European Championships.

== Routine music information ==
Year	Apparatus	Music Title
2022	Hoop	The 5th by David Garrett
2022	Ball	Pushin On by 2WEI & Marvin Brooks
2022	Clubs	Sad Girls by TheDjLawyer
2022	Ribbon	Forbidden Love by Abel Korzeniowski, The Hollywood Studio Symphonic & Jasper Randall
2021	Hoop	The 5th by David Garrett
2021	Ball	Taranta by Ludovico Einaudi
2021	Clubs	Sad Girls by TheDjLawyer
2021	Ribbon	Can You Dig It by Brian Tyler
2020	Rope	A Little Less Conversation (JXL Remix) by Elvis Presley & JXL
2020	Ball	Taranta by Ludovico Einaudi
2020	Clubs	Cosmos by Elitsa Todorova, Stoyan Yankoulov & Miroslav Ivanov
2020	Ribbon	Escape From East Berlin by Daniel Pemberton
2019	Rope	A Little Less Conversation (JXL Remix) by Elvis Presley & JXL
2019	Ball	My Homeland by Havasi
2019	Clubs	Cosmos by Elitsa Todorova, Stoyan Yankoulov & Miroslav Ivanov
2019	Ribbon	Escape From East Berlin by Daniel Pemberton

== See also ==
- List of medalists at the Rhythmic Gymnastics Junior European Championships
