= Alona Hillel =

Israeli rhythmic gymnast

- אלונה הלל
- Born: 1 March 2006 (age 20) Israel

Gymnastics career
- Discipline: Rhythmic gymnastics
- Country represented: Israel (2020-present)
- Head coach: Ayelet Zussman
Medal record
Rhythmic Gymnastics
Representing Israel
Event	1st	2nd	3rd
Junior European Championships	0	1	2
FIG World Cup	'	0	1
Total	0	1	3
Junior European Championships
Silver medal – second place	2020 Kyiv	Team
Bronze medal – third place	2021 Varna	All-Around
Bronze medal – third place	2021 Varna	5 Ribbons

Alona Hillel (Hebrew: אלונה הלל; born 1 March 2006) is an Israeli rhythmic gymnast. She won a silver medal in teams at the 2020 European Championships.

== Rhythmic gymnastics career ==
=== Junior ===
Hillel debuted in major competitions at the 2020 European Championships in Kyiv, she won silver in the team category along Daria Atamanov and the senior group. The following year she was part of the junior group that competed at the European Championships in Varna along Eliza Banchuk, Shani Bakanov, Emili Malka and Simona Rudnik, they won two bronze medals in the All-Around and with 5 ribbons.

=== Senior ===
In 2022 Alona became a senior and competed at the World Cup stage in Portimão, she ended 16th in the All-Around, 30th with hoop, 20th with ball, 18th with clubs and won silver in the ribbon final behind Eva Brezalieva.

== See also ==
- List of medalists at the Rhythmic Gymnastics Junior European Championships
