= Dina Agisheva =

Belarusian rhythmic gymnast (born 2005)

- Full name: Dina Aliaksandraŭna Agisheva
- Alternative name: Dina Alexandrovna Agisheva
- Born: April 17, 2005 (age 21) Rostov-on-Don, Russia

Gymnastics career
- Discipline: Rhythmic gymnastics
- Country represented: Belarus (2020)
- Head coach: Irina Leparskaya
- Assistant coach: Yuliya Bichun-Kamarova
Medal record
Representing Belarus
Rhythmic Gymnastics
Junior European Championships
| Gold medal – first place | 2020 Kyiv | Rope |

Dina Aliaksandraŭna Agisheva (Belarusian: Дзіна Аляксандраўна Агішава, Russian: Дина Александровна Агишева; born April 17, 2005) is a Belarusian individual rhythmic gymnast. She is the 2020 Junior European champion with Rope.
