= Lily Ramonatxo =

French rhythmic gymnast

- Born: 24 February 2005 (age 21) Montpellier, France

Gymnastics career
- Discipline: Rhythmic gymnastics
- Country represented: France (2018-2026)
- Club: Montpellier 3M GRS
- Head coach: Alexandra Konova
- Assistant coach: Emilie Bohn
- Former coach: Sandrine Cabrera
- Choreographer: Alexandra Konova
- Retired: yes
- World ranking: 18 WC
Medal record
Representing France
Rhythmic Gymnastics
Grand Prix Final
Silver medal – second place	2022 Brno	All-around
Silver medal – second place	2022 Brno	Clubs
Silver medal – second place	2022 Brno	Ribbon
Bronze medal – third place	2022 Brno	Ball
Bronze medal – third place	2023 Brno	Hoop
Gymnasiades
Gold medal – first place	2022 Normandy	Ribbon
Silver medal – second place	2022 Normandy	Hoop
Bronze medal – third place	2022 Normandy	All-around

Lily Ramonatxo (born 24 February 2005) is a retired French individual rhythmic gymnast. She a two-time French National all-around medalist.

== Personal life ==
Lily comes from a sport family. Her grandfather Eric Koechlin finished 16th in the men's K1 canoe slalom event at the 1972 Olympic Games in Munich, and won a K1 men's team world championship bronze medal in 1973. Her aunt Caroline Koechlin-Aubert is a former professional basketball player who represented France, before moving into coaching. Her cousin Camille Prigent represents France in canoe slalom, and won a women's team K1 world championship gold medal in 2018, and a European championship gold medal in the same event in 2019. She studies Mathematics and Computer Science at the University of Montpellier.

== Career ==
Lily Ramonatxo started rhythmic gymnastics at 8 years old after watching the 2011 World Rhythmic Gymnastics Championships in her hometown, Montpellier. She began her career with coach Sandrine Cabrera in Montpellier 3M GRS club, before switching with Alexandra Konova when she joined the national youth training hub in the same city.

=== Junior ===
Her first competition as a national team member was the International Tournament in Corbeil-Essonnes, France. The next year, she won the silver medal in the all-around at the French national junior championships, along with a gold in the ribbon final and a bronze with clubs. Thanks to her results, she was selected to represent France at the 2019 Junior World Rhythmic Gymnastics Championships in Moscow, Russia. She competed with the rope, and finished 23rd with a score of 13.950.

In 2020, her last junior season, she won silver with clubs at the Corbeil-Essonnes International tournament. She also won three medals at the Fellbach Schmiden tournament in Germany: two silvers with ribbon and clubs, and a bronze with ball. Due to the COVID-19 pandemic, most of the events in the season were cancelled. Her final junior competition was the 2020 Rhythmic Gymnastics European Championships in Kyiv, postponed in November. With her teammate Elsa Somville and the group, she finished 4th in the team competition. She qualified to three finals: she finished 7th with rope and clubs and 8th with ball.

=== Senior ===
In 2021, she started competing as a senior. She debuted on international level at Baku World Cup, where she was 45th in All-around. Later, she competed at Challenge Cup in Cluj-Napoca, Romania, where she ended on 12th place in All-around. She qualified to her first Apparatus final - Ball, and took 7th place.

In 2022, she began her season at Palaio Faliro World Cup and took 7th place in all-around. She qualified to two apparatus finals, finishing 6th in ball and 5th in ribbon. At Sofia World Cup she was 13th in all-around and did not advance into any apparatus finals (9th in clubs and ribbon). She represented France at the 2022 European Championships in Tel Aviv and placed 24th in all-around competition. Together with Hélène Karbanov they placed 7th in team competition.

In Autumn 2024, she moved to Udine, Italy to train at Associazione Sportiva Udinese under guidance of Italian coach Špela Dragaš.

In 2025, she began her season at Sofia World Cup in April, where she took 47th place in all-around. She was most successful with clubs (20th place). Then she competed at Tashkent World Cup and took 26th place in all-around. She was 14th with Clubs. On May 15-18, she competed at European Cup in Burgas, Bulgaria. She took 4th place in Hoop, 18th place in Ball, 10th place in Clubs and 11th place in Ribbon. She won silver medal in all-around behind Maëna Millon at French National Championships in Paris. In finals, she won gold in clubs and ribbon finals and silver in hoop and ball finals. In June, Lily represented France together with Maena Millon at the 2025 European Championships in Tallinn, France. She placed 19th in all-around final. They took 9th place in team competition together with senior group. In July, she competed at World Challenge Cup Cluj-Napoca, and took 24th place in all-around.

In August, Lily and Maena represented France at the 2025 World Championships in Rio de Janeiro, Brazil. Lily ended on 37th place in all-around qualifications. This was her first World Championship.

In 2026, she competed at Thiais Grand Prix and took 7th place in all-around. She was 6th in both ball and ribbon finals. She announced her retirement right after, performing at a gala.

== Routine music information ==
Year	Apparatus	Music title
2025	Hoop	Bad to the Bone [Extended Version] by 2WEI & Bri Bryant
2025	Ball	Find Me (Spoken Word) by Forest Blakk / Cornfield Chase (Interstellar Piano Cover) by Dorian Marko
2025	Clubs	Come Check This by Fetish
2025	Ribbon	A Change Is Gonna Come by Seal
2023	Hoop	"Trouble" by Alan Cumming
2023	Ball	"(IL Est 5 heures) Paris S'éveille" by An Pierlé
2023	Clubs	"Opening: I Hope I Get It" from A Chorus Line by Marvin Hamlisch
2023	Ribbon	"Boléro" by Prequell
2022	Hoop	"Bohemian Rhapsody" by Queen
2022	Ball	"(IL Est 5 heures) Paris S'éveille" by An Pierlé
2022	Clubs	"Allumez le Feu" by Johnny Hallyday
2022	Ribbon	"Boléro" by Prequell
2021	Hoop	"Sax" by Fleur East
2021	Ball	"Bad Guy" by Billie Eilish
2021	Clubs	"Були на селі" by Vopli Vidopliassova
2021	Ribbon	"Dance Monkey" by Tones and I
