= Yelyzaveta Zorkina =

Belarusian rhythmic gymnast (born 2006)

- Елізавета Зоркіна
- Nickname: Liza
- Born: January 25, 2006 (age 20) Ukraine

Gymnastics career
- Discipline: Rhythmic gymnastics
- Country represented: Belarus; (2018-2024)
- Head coach: Irina Leparskaya
- Assistant coach: Yuliya Bichun-Kamarova
Medal record
Event	1st	2nd	3rd
European Championships	0	1	1
Grand Prix Final	0	0	1
Total	0	1	2
Representing Belarus
Rhythmic Gymnastics
Junior European Championships
Silver medal – second place	2020 Kyiv	Clubs
Bronze medal – third place	2020 Kyiv	Ball

Yelyzaveta Zorkina (Belarusian: Елізавета Зоркіна; born 25 January 2006) is a Belarusian retired individual rhythmic gymnast of Ukrainian descent.

== Career ==
=== Junior ===
Zorkina started to appear at international competitions in 2018, participating in various tournaments and winning medals. In November 2020 she was part of the team that represented Belarus at the European Championships in Kyiv, which were postponed because of the COVID-19 pandemic. She competed with ball and clubs. She made it to both apparatus finals, winning bronze with ball behind Polina Karika and Stiliana Nikolova and silver with clubs behind Daria Atamanov and ahead Evelin Viktória Kocsis.

In 2021 Yelyzaveta took part in the 2021 Moscow Grand Prix. In May, she competed at the Irina Deleanu Cup, where she won bronze with ribbon. She won the silver medal in the all-around at the 2021 Belarusian National Championships.

=== Senior ===
In 2022, she turned senior, but following the Russian invasion of Ukraine in February, gymnasts from Belarus were also forbidden to participate in FIG events. Zorkina, like many other Russian and Belarusian gymnasts, then started attending bilateral tournaments between the two nations, or open competitions such as Crystal Rose (where she was 7th in the all-around) or the UAE International Gymnastika Cup.

She announced her retirement from competitive sport in November 2024 through an Instagram post.
