= Benrubi SA =

Greek manufacturing company

Benrubi SA is a Greek manufacturing company of household appliances, such a retailing company (under the name "Mega Outlet").

It was established in 1880 in Thessaloniki. The company has industrial facilities in Kalochori, Thessaloniki and in Boeotia.
