= Zohra Aghamirova =

Azerbaijani rhythmic gymnast

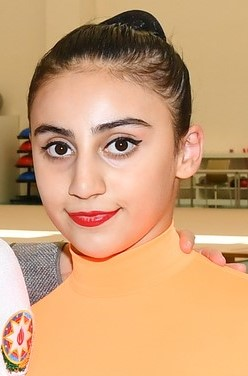

Personal information
- Born: 8 August 2001 (age 25) Baku, Azerbaijan

Gymnastics career
- Discipline: Rhythmic gymnastics
- Country represented: Azerbaijan
- Club: Ojaq Sports Club
- Head coaches: Yevgeniya Vilyayeva, Mariana Vasileva
Medal record
Rhythmic Gymnastics
Representing Azerbaijan
European Championships
Bronze medal – third place	2023 Baku	Ball
Islamic Solidarity Games
Gold medal – first place	2017 Baku	Team
Gold medal – first place	2021 Konya	Team
Gold medal – first place	2021 Konya	Clubs
Gold medal – first place	2021 Konya	Ribbon
Silver medal – second place	2021 Konya	Hoop
Bronze medal – third place	2021 Konya	Ball
Summer Universiade
Silver medal – second place	2019 Naples	All-around
Silver medal – second place	2021 Chengdu	Clubs
Silver medal – second place	2021 Chengdu	Hoop
Silver medal – second place	2019 Naples	Clubs
Bronze medal – third place	2021 Chengdu	Ribbon

Zohra Aghamirova (Azerbaijani: Zöhrə Ağamirova; born 8 August 2001) is an Azerbaijani retired rhythmic gymnast who competed at the 2020 Summer Olympics and the 2024 Summer Olympics.

== Personal life ==
Aghamirova began gymnastics when she was three and started rhythmic gymnastics when she was four. She joined the national school for gymnasts in 2015. In 2018, she started studying at the Azerbaijan State Academy of Physical Education and Sport.

== Career ==
=== Junior ===
Aghamirova started the 2016 season at Miss Valentine in Tartu, where she won the bronze medal in the all-around and qualified to three finals. She won a silver medal with clubs and bronze medals with rope and ball. She won the all-around at the 2016 Azerbaijani Junior National Championships. In the apparatus finals, she also won gold with rope, silver with ball and bronze with clubs.

She competed at the 2016 European Championships in Holon, Israel, where she and her teammates Ilaha Mammadova and Veronika Hudis won 8th place in the junior team competition. In the qualification round, she placed 15th in clubs and 37th with ball.

=== Senior ===
At the 2017 Islamic Solidarity Games, which were hosted in her home country of Azerbaijan, Aghamirova won the gold medal in the team competition with Marina Durunda and Zhala Piriyeva. She made her World Championship debut at the 2017 World Championships in Pesaro, Italy, and she placed twenty-seventh in the all-around qualifications.

In 2018, Aghamirova competed at the European Championships in Guadalajara, Spain, where she finished eighteenth in the all-around. At the 2018 World Championships in Sofia, Bulgaria, she qualified to the individual all-around final, finishing in twenty-fourth place.

In June 2019, Aghamirova represented Azerbaijan at the 2019 European Games in Minsk, Belarus, where she finished eighth place in the all-around competition. In July, she took part in the 2019 Summer Universiade in Naples, Italy and won a silver medal in the all-around. She qualified to all four apparatus finals, and she won another silver medal in clubs.

The 2019 World Championships were held in her hometown of Baku, Azerbaijan. Aghamirova said that the competition was important to her both because of its location and because it was a qualifier for the 2020 Summer Olympics. She finished in sixteenth place in the all-around final, which won Azerbaijan a spot at the Olympic games.

In 2021, she competed in the European Championships and placed 16th in the all-around. Aghamirova was selected to represent Azerbaijan at the Olympics, and at the 2020 Olympic Games, she finished eighteenth in the qualification round for the individual all-around. Later that year, at the 2021 World Championships, she was 24th place in the all-around qualifications and did not advance to the final.

In June 2022, she competed at the European Championships and placed 9th in the all-around, her best placement at that competition thus far. In August, she competed at the delayed 2021 Islamic Solidarity Games. She won gold in the team competition with her teammates Alina Gozalova, Ilona Zeynalova, and the Azerbaijani group. Individually, she also won gold in the clubs and ribbon finals, silver with hoop, and bronze with ball. In September, she was selected for the World Championships. She was 13th in the all-around final and reached two apparatus finals; she finished 6th with hoop and 5th with ribbon.

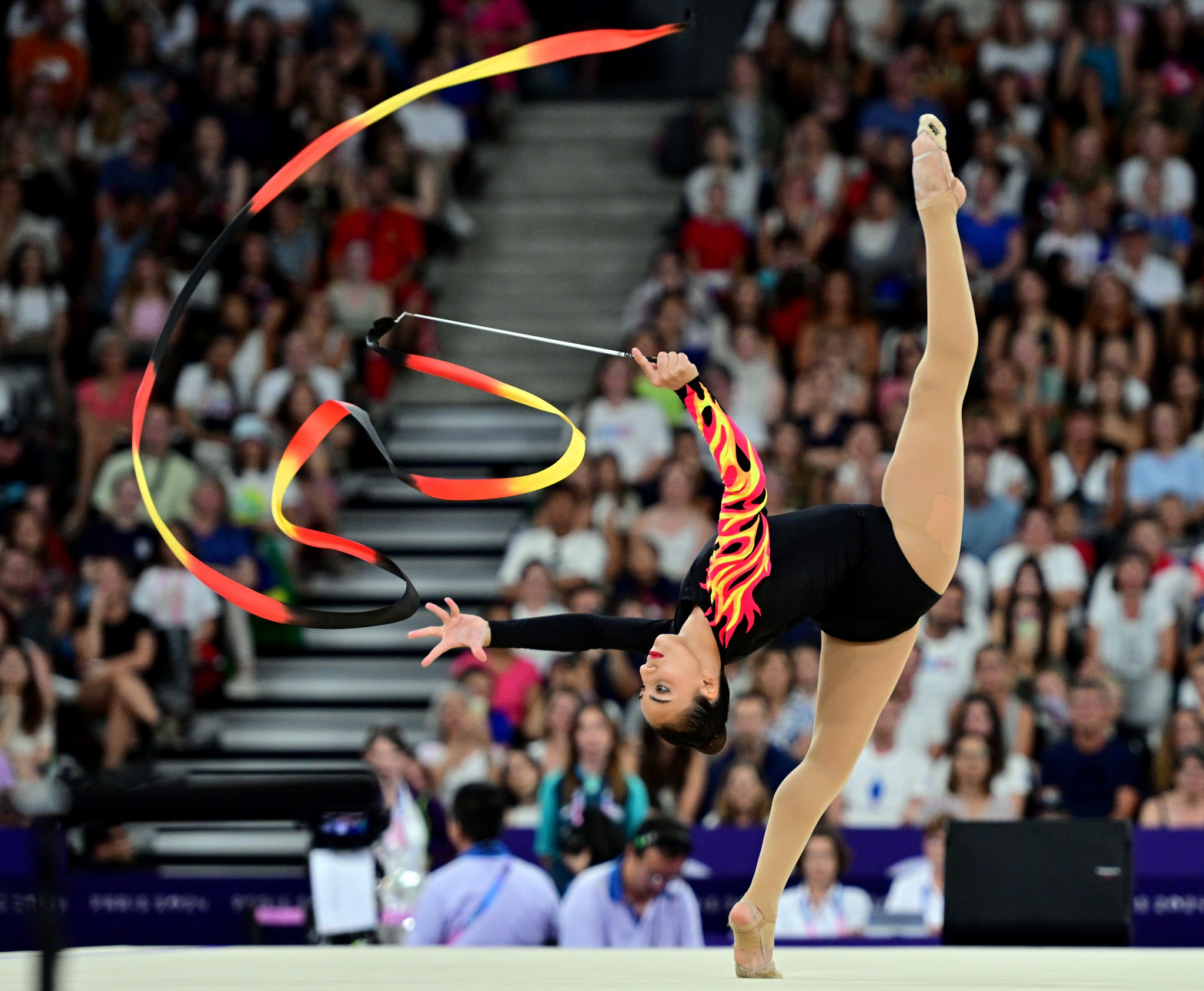
Aghamirova performing a back standing split in her ribbon routine at the 2024 Summer Olympics

In May 2023, Aghamirova competed at the European Championships and won her first medal, a bronze in the ball final. She said that she was very happy to win a medal at the European Championships. In July, she competed at the delayed 2021 Summer World University Games. She won three medals: bronze with ribbon and silver with clubs and hoop. She then competed at the World Championships in August. In the qualification round, she was 12th, which was high enough to once again win an Olympic quota for Azerbaijan. She finished in 18th in the all-around final. At the end of the year, she was named Best Female Athlete of the Year for Azerbaijan along with Govhar Beydullayeva and Irina Zaretska and one of the top ten athletes of the year.

At the 2024 European Championships, she placed 17th in the all-around final. In August, she competed at the 2024 Summer Olympics. In the qualification round, she placed 19th and did not advance to the final.

She announced her retirement in December 2024.

== Routine music information ==
Year	Apparatus	Music title
2020	Hoop	"Кибитка" by Ирина Дюкова
2020	Ball	"Back in Black" by Sershen&Zaritskaya
2020	Clubs	"Ona Hei" by Jeff van Dyck
2020	Ribbon	unknown
2019	Hoop	"Lion" by Kodo
2019	Ball	unknown
2019	Clubs	"MortalKombat (Remix)" by Joe Burgess
2019	Ribbon	"Nothing Else Matters" by Metallica
