= Alina Gozalova =

Azerbaijani rhythmic gymnast

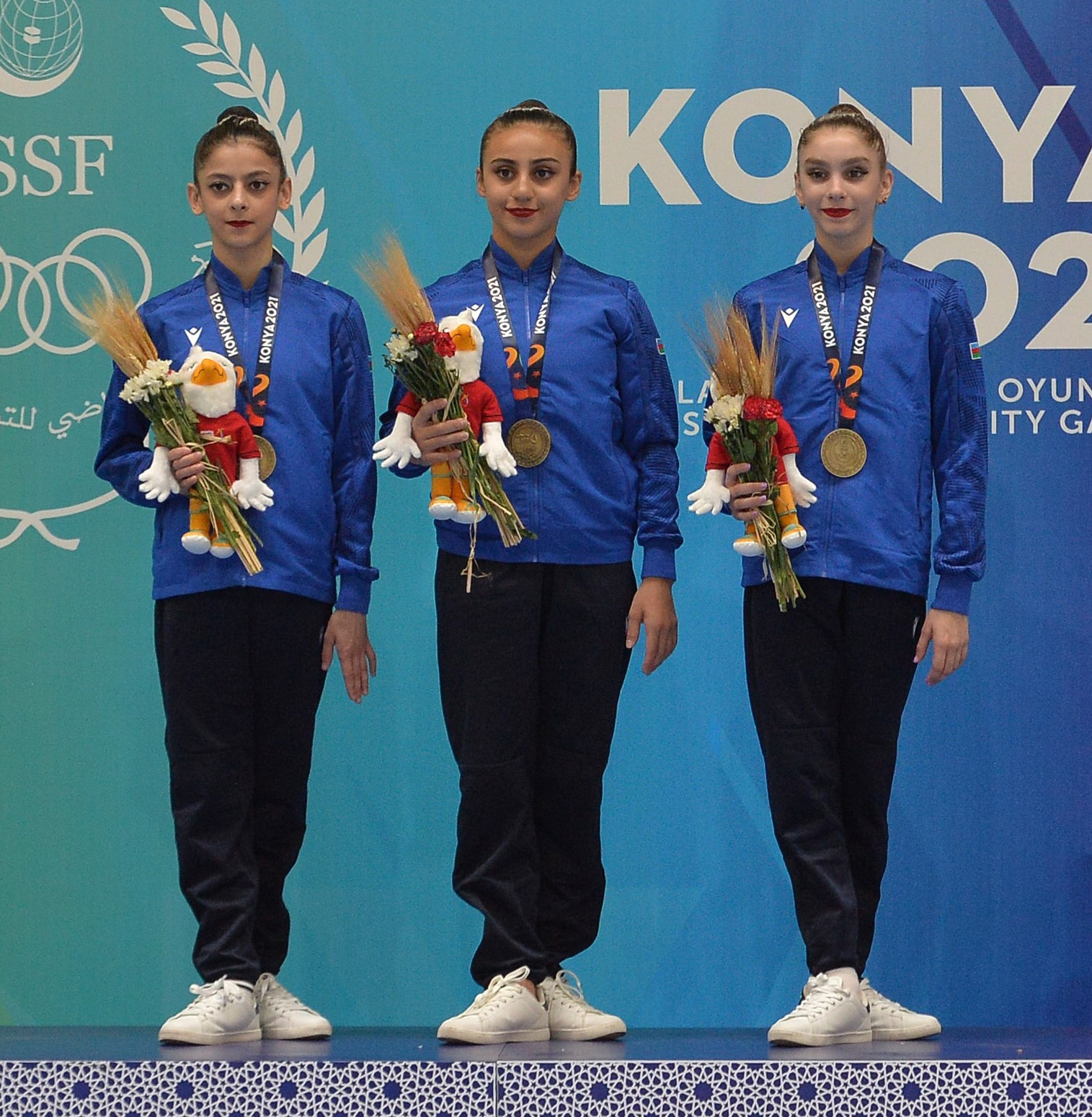
- Gozalova, right, at the Islamic Solidarity Games 2021

Personal information
- Born: 16 February 2006 (age 20) Azerbaijan

Gymnastics career
- Discipline: Rhythmic gymnastics
- Country represented: Azerbaijan (2019-)
- Club: Ojaq Sports Club
- Head coach: Mariana Vasileva
- Assistant coach: Nigar Abdusalimova
Medal record
Representing Azerbaijan
Rhythmic Gymnastics
European Championships
Bronze medal – third place	2020 Kyiv	Team
Islamic Solidarity Games
Gold medal – first place	2021 Konya	Team

Alina Gozalova (born 16 February 2006) is an Azerbaijani rhythmic gymnast. She represent her country in international competitions.

== Career ==
Gonzalova debuted at the 2019 Happy Cup in Gent where she won gold with ball. A year later she was selected to participate in the 2020 European Championships in Kyiv along Narmin Bayramova, Leyli Aghazada, Ilona Zeynalova and the senior group, achieving the bronze medal in the team category.

In 2022 she debuted as a senior, taking part in two World Cup stages: Tashkent (20th in the All-Around, hoop and ribbon, 19th with ball and 15th with clubs) and Pesaro (30th in the All-Around, 35th hoop, 28th with ball, 35th with clubs and 28th with ribbon). In May she took part in the Gdynia Cup tournament where she won a bronze medal with ball. Alina was also part of the Azeri team that won gold at the V Islamic Solidarity Games in Konya. At nationals she won gold with clubs. In September Gozalova was selected for the World Championships in Sofia, she competed with hoop and ball achieving the 39th and 51st places.

== Routine music information ==
Year	Apparatus	Music Title
2023	Hoop	U Plavu Zoru by Pink Martini
2023	Ball	Bensonhurst Blues by Oscar Benton
2023	Clubs	Que Se Sepa by Roberto Roena
2023	Ribbon	
2022	Hoop	Casting by Christophe Maé
2022	Ball	Bensonhurst Blues by Oscar Benton
2022	Clubs	Shadows and Dust by Adam Burns
2022	Ribbon	Cancion del mariachi by Max Hauer
2020	Rope	
2020	Ball	I Put a Spell On You by Jay Hawkins
2020	Clubs	Гоп-ця by Vidopolasov's shriek
2020	Ribbon	
