= Yana Kramarenko =

Israeli rhythmic gymnast

- יאנה קרמרנקו
- Born: June 11, 2002 (age 24) Israel

Gymnastics career
- Discipline: Rhythmic gymnastics
- Country represented: Israel
- Club: Maccabi Tel Aviv
- Head coaches: Maria Vainblat Revivo, Ira Vigdorchik
- Assistant coach: Moran Buzovsky
- Choreographer: Rahel Vigdozchik
Medal record
Representing Israel
Rhythmic gymnastics
European Championships
Gold medal – first place	2020 Kyiv	Group All-around
Gold medal – first place	2021 Varna	3 Hoops + 4 Clubs
Silver medal – second place	2020 Kyiv	Team
Silver medal – second place	2020 Kyiv	5 Balls
Bronze medal – third place	2021 Varna	Team
Bronze medal – third place	2021 Varna	Group All-around
Bronze medal – third place	2021 Varna	5 Balls
Junior European Championships
Bronze medal – third place	2017 Budapest	10 Clubs

Yana Kramarenko (Hebrew: יאנה קרמרנקו; born June 11, 2002, in Israel) is an Israeli individual and group rhythmic gymnast. She is the 2020 European Group All-around champion.

== Rhythmic gymnastics career ==
=== Junior ===
Yana was a member of junior team that represented Israel at the 2016 Junior European Championships in Holon, Israel and placed 4th in Team competition. She placed 8th in Rope Qualifications and 23rd in Ball Qualifications. In 2017, she joined Israeli junior group and competed at International Tournament Alina Cup in Moscow, where they took silver medal in Group All-around behind Russia. At the 2017 Junior European Championships in Budapest, Hungary they won bronze medal in 10 Clubs final.

=== Senior ===
In 2019, she joined Israeli senior group. They placed 6th in Group All-around at the 2019 World Championships in Baku, Azerbaijan.

In November 2020, they won gold medal at the 2020 European Championships in Group All-around and silver in Team competition.

== See also ==
- List of medalists at the Rhythmic Gymnastics Junior European Championships
