= Arzu Jalilova =

Azerbaijani rhythmic gymnast

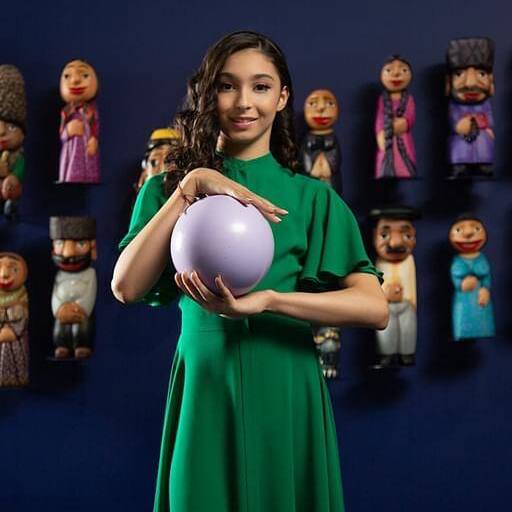

Personal information
- Born: 4 June 2004 (age 22) Azerbaijan
- Height: 172 cm (5 ft 8 in)

Gymnastics career
- Discipline: Rhythmic gymnastics
- Country represented: Azerbaijan
- Club: Ocaq Sport Club
- Head coaches: Anastasiya Prasolova, Mariana Vasileva
Medal record
Rhythmic Gymnastics
Representing Azerbaijan
Junior World Championships
Silver medal – second place	2019 Moscow	Ball
Bronze medal – third place	2019 Moscow	Rope
Junior European Championships
Bronze medal – third place	2018 Guadalajara	Ball

Arzu Jalilova (Azerbaijani: Arzu Cəlilova; Russian: Арзу Джалилова; born 4 June 2004, Baku, Azerbaijan) is a retired Azerbaijani rhythmic gymnast. Arzu Jalilova is a silver and bronze medalist of the 1st Junior World Championship (Moscow, Russian Federation, 2019), and a bronze medalist of the European Championship (Guadalajara, Spain, 2018). She is also a prize winner of many local and international tournaments in rhythmic gymnastics.

== Personal life ==
Arzu was born in the family of Natig Jalilov and Nigar Jalilova in Baku, Azerbaijan in 2004. She went to School-Lyceum N6 and later transferred to a sports gymnasium. Her grandfather Gurban Jalilov was a famous Azerbaijani academician. Her father, Natig Jalilov, lost his life in a car accident before Arzu was born.

== Career ==
When she turned 4 years old, her mother Nigar Jalilova enrolled her in the rhythmic gymnastics section of "Neftchi" Sports Club. From the age of 8, he started performing in city, national and international competitions.

== Major results ==
- In February 2012 - Open Baku Championship in rhythmic gymnastics, 2nd place among eight-year-old gymnasts.
- In July 2012 International tournament in Turin, Italy in rhythmic gymnastics, gold medal for ball routines.
- In October 2012 - 19th Baku Championship in rhythmic gymnastics, 2nd place among gymnasts born in 2004.
- In November 2012 - Azerbaijan Championship, 3rd place among gymnasts born in 2004.
- In November 2013 - International tournament in Budapest for juniors in rhythmic gymnastics, 1st place in all-around and 2nd place in rope routines.
- In December 2014 - Azerbaijani Championship and Baku Championship in rhythmic gymnastics, 1st place among gymnasts born in 2004.
- In February 2016 - "Miss Valentine" International Tournament in Tartu, Estonia, silver medal in juniors program.
- According to the results of 2016, Azerbaijan Gymnastics Federation included Arzu Jalilova in the list of "Top 10 gymnasts of the year".
- In August 2017 - 24th Open Azerbaijan Championship in rhythmic gymnastics, 3rd place.
- In April 2018 - AGF Junior Trophy in Baku, bronze medal in team competition.
- In March 2018 - International competitions in Riga, Latvia in rhythmic gymnastics, bronze medal in individual program.
- In May 2018 - International tournament in Guadalajara, Spain in rhythmic gymnastics, bronze medal with Nigar Samedova.
- In June 2018 - European Championships in rhythmic gymnastics in Guadalajara, Spain, bronze medal for ball routines.
- In April 2019 - "Irina Cup" International Tournament in Warsaw, silver medal for rope routines.
- In April 2019 - AGF Junior Trophy International Tournament in Baku, bronze medal in youth category.
- In March 2019 - International tournament in Corbeil-Essonnes, France in rhythmic gymnastics, two bronze medals in individual program with ribbon and clubs.
- In June 2019 - International tournament in Gdynia, Poland in rhythmic gymnastics, silver medal for ball routines and bronze medal for clubs composition.
- In July 2019 - I World Championships in Moscow in rhythmic gymnastics in youth category, bronze medal for ribbon composition and silver medal for ball routines.

== See also ==
- List of medalists at the Rhythmic Gymnastics Junior European Championships
