= Yuliana Telegina =

Israeli rhythmic gymnast

- יוליאנה טלגין
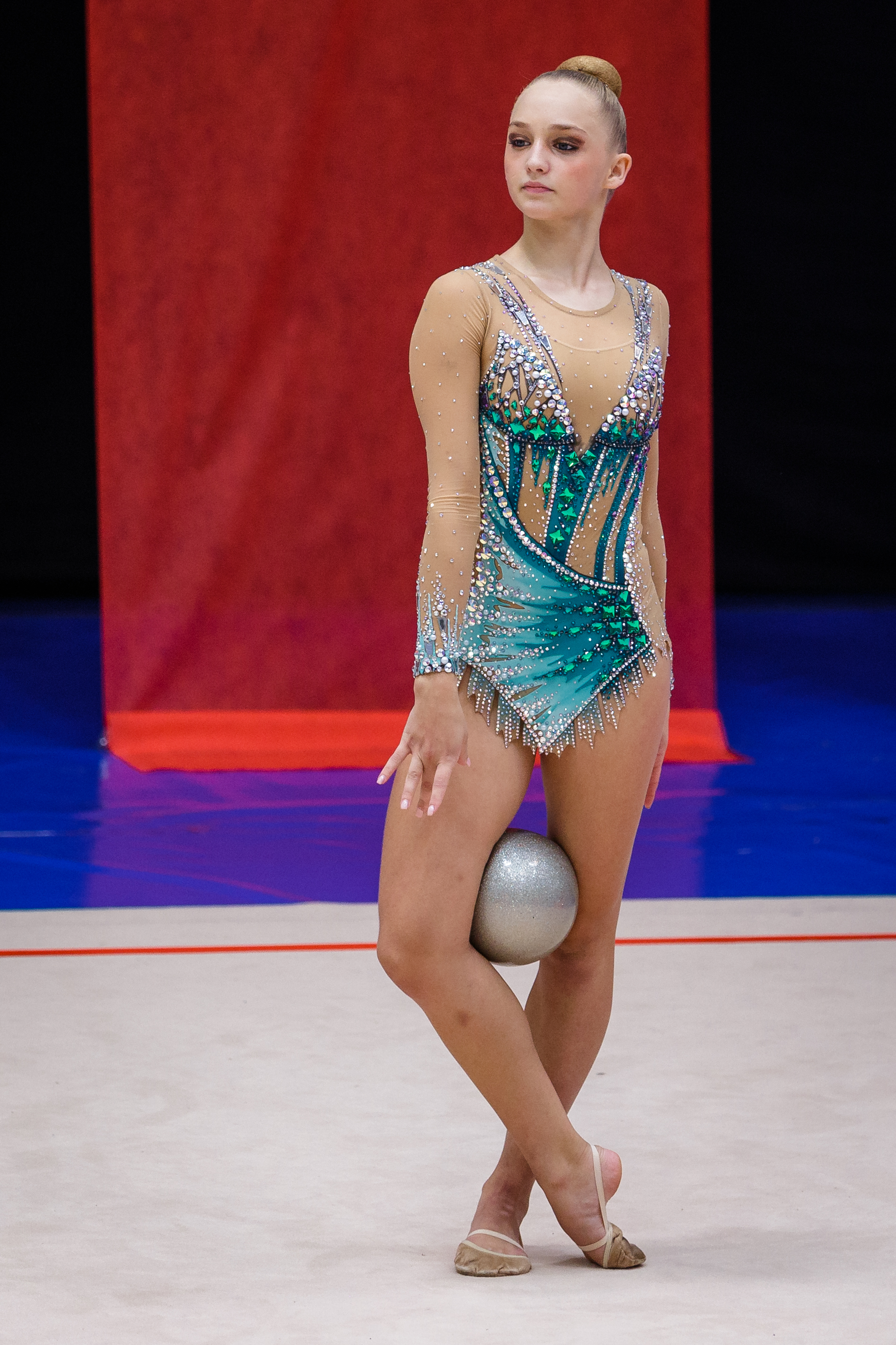

Personal information
- Born: March 22, 2002 (age 24) Irkutsk, Russia

Gymnastics career
- Discipline: Rhythmic gymnastics
- Country represented: Israel
- Club: Maccabi Tel Aviv
- Head coaches: Ela Samofalov, Rahel VigdorchiK, Noa Kadosh
- Assistant coaches: Elena Zelikman, Moran Buzovsky
Medal record
Representing Israel
Rhythmic gymnastics
World Championships
Silver medal – second place	2019 Baku	Team
European Championships
Gold medal – first place	2020 Kyiv	Group All-around
Gold medal – first place	2021 Varna	3 Hoops + 4 Clubs
Silver medal – second place	2020 Kyiv	Team
Silver medal – second place	2020 Kyiv	5 Balls
Bronze medal – third place	2021 Varna	Team
Bronze medal – third place	2021 Varna	Group All-around
Bronze medal – third place	2021 Varna	5 Balls
Junior European Championships
Bronze medal – third place	2017 Budapest	10 Clubs

Yuliana Telegina (Hebrew: יוליאנה טלגינה, Russian: Юлиана Сергеевна Телегина; born March 22, 2002, in Russia) is a retired Israeli individual and group rhythmic gymnast. She is the 2020 European Group All-around champion.

== Rhythmic gymnastics career ==
=== Junior ===
Yuliana was a member of junior team that represented Israel at the 2016 Junior European Championships in Holon, Israel and placed 4th in Team competition. She qualified to two apparatus, where she finished on 4th place (Rope) and 8th place (Clubs). In 2017, she joined Israeli junior group and competed at International Tournament Alina Cup in Moscow, where they took silver medal in Group All-around behind Russia. At the 2017 Junior European Championships in Budapest, Hungary they won silver medal in 10 Clubs final.

=== Senior ===
In 2018, she became senior. She competed at World Cup Pesaro and ended on 12th place in All-around. She competed as individual gymnast and helped her teammates Linoy Ashram and Nicol Zelikman placing 4th in Team competition at the 2018 World Championships in Sofia, Bulgaria, competing with Hoop and Ball. She placed 4th in All-around at the 2019 Israeli National Championships. She replaced Linoy Ashram at the 2019 European Championships in Baku, Azerbaijan and finished 14th in All-around. Her second World Championships participation was in 2019 in Baku, where she and her teammates Linoy Ashram, Nicol Zelikman and Nicol Voronkov won silver medal in Team competition. She ended on 25th place in Ribbon Qualification.

In 2020, she joined Israeli senior group and competed at Grand Prix Moscow. In November, they won gold medal at the 2020 European Championships in Group All-around and silver in Team competition.

== See also ==
- List of medalists at the Rhythmic Gymnastics Junior European Championships
