= Ira Vigdorchik =

Israeli rhythmic gymnastics coach

- אירה ויגדורצ'יק
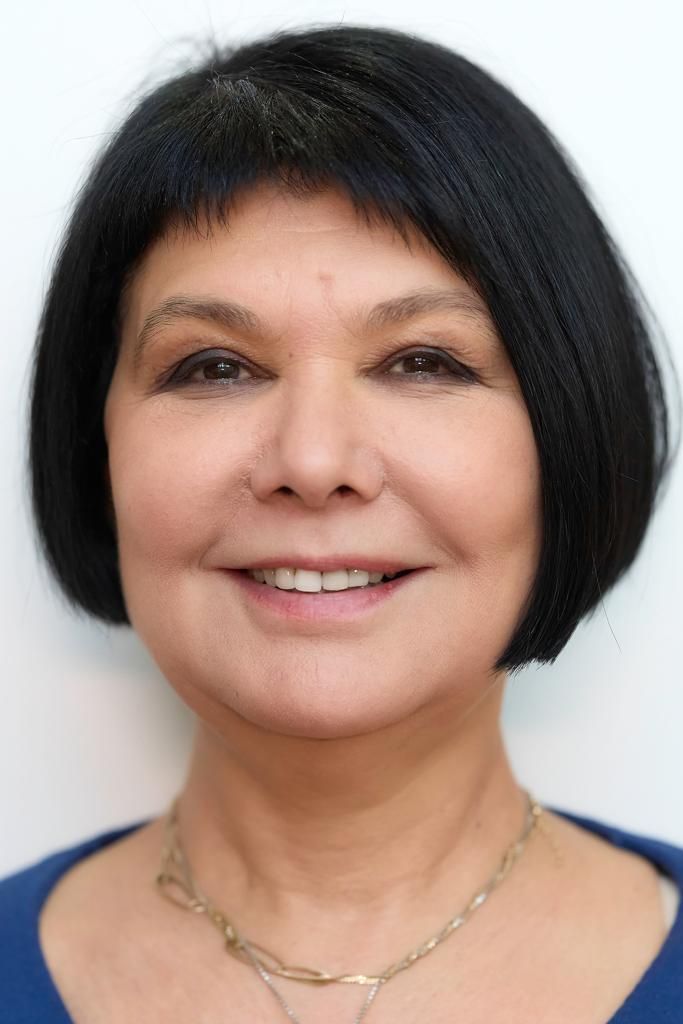
- Born: March 8, 1964 (age 61); Moscow, Soviet Union
- Citizenship: Israeli
- Known for: rhythmic gymnastics coach

Ira Vigdorchik (Hebrew: אירה ויגדורצ'יק; born 8 March 1964) is an Israeli rhythmic gymnastics coach who has also coached the Russian national team. She now works as an aesthetic group gymnastics coach.

== Biography ==
Vigdorchik was born in the Soviet Union on March 8, 1964. She later immigrated to Israel from Moscow in 1979. She coached the Israeli team from 2008 to 2021, with a one-year break in 2016.

In 1988, Vigdorchik founded the Holon City Club, a gymnastics club that has since grown to include approximately 300 gymnasts at various levels of training. The club has produced a number of elite gymnasts who have represented Israel in World and European Championships. The club also hosted the European Rhythmic Gymnastics Championships in 2016.

After the 2020 Summer Olympics, her contract as leader of Israeli national group was not renewed due to poor relationships with other members of the team and controversial remarks that she had made about gymnast Linoy Ashram and her coach. She was invited by Russia's head coach of rhythmic gymnastics, Irina Viner, to train the Russian national group team.

In 2023, she returned to Israel after two years of coaching in Russia and began acting as an aesthetic group gymnastics coach.

Her oldest daughter, Rahel Vigdozchik, is also a gymnastics coach and former gymnast.

== Controversy ==
Throughout her career, Vigdorchik has been a controversial figure, often making headlines in Israel for her outspoken statements and training methods. Before the 2016 Summer Olympics, she faced allegations of misconduct, including verbal and physical abuse, leading to a temporary suspension that was later overturned by a committee, though she was moved to a position where she did not directly coach gymnasts. Vigdorchik has denied the allegations.
