= Rahel Vigdozchik =

Israeli rhythmic gymnast

Raheli Vigdorchik
- רחלי ויגדורצ'יק
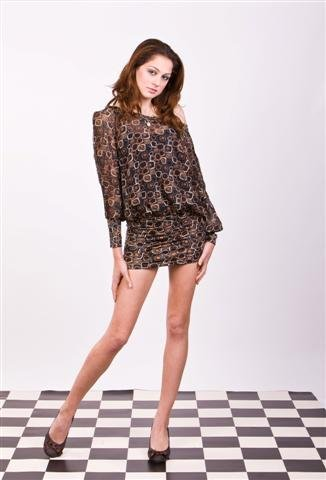

Personal information
- Born: May 1, 1989 (age 37)
- Height: 5 ft 10 in (178 cm)
- Spouse: Sean Faiga

Gymnastics career
- Discipline: Rhythmic gymnastics
- Country represented: Israel

Rahel "Raheli" Faiga-Vigdorchik (or Vigdozchik, Hebrew: רחלי ויגדורצ'יק; born May 1, 1989) is an Israeli Olympic rhythmic gymnast and a coach of the Israel women's national team.

== Biography ==
Rahel Vigdorchik was born in Holon, Israel. Her mother Ira Vigdorchik is well known as the head coach of the Israel women's rhythmic gymnast national team.

She and her teammates placed 6th in the finals on behalf of Israel at the 2008 Summer Olympics in Beijing as a part of the Israeli National Rhythmic Gymnastic Team.

She and her Israeli teammates placed 5th in the 2009 World Rhythmic Gymnastics Championships in both Hoops and All-Around in Mie, Japan.
