= Gymnastics at the 2019 European Games – Women's rhythmic group 5 balls =

Women's rhythmic group 5 balls at the 2019 European Games
- Venue: Minsk-Arena
- Date: 23 June
- Competitors: 40 from 8 nations
- Winning score: 27.300

Medalists
gold medal	Vera Biryukova; Anastasia Maksimova; Anastasia Shishmakova; Anzhelika Stubailo; Maria Tolkacheva	Russia
silver medal	Simona Dyankova; Stefani Kiryakova; Madlen Radukanova; Erika Zafirova; Laura Traets	Bulgaria
bronze medal	Hanna Haidukevich; Anastasiya Rybakova; Hanna Shvaiba; Arina Tsitsilina; Karyna Yarmolenka	Belarus

The women's rhythmic group 5 balls competition at the 2019 European Games was held at the Minsk-Arena on 23 June 2019.

== Results ==
Rank	Gymnast	Nation	D Score	E Score	Pen.	Total
1st place, gold medalist(s)	Vera Biryukova; Anastasia Maksimova; Anastasia Shishmakova; Anzhelika Stubailo; Maria Tolkacheva	Russia	19.300	8.000		27.300
2nd place, silver medalist(s)	Simona Dyankova; Stefani Kiryakova; Madlen Radukanova; Erika Zafirova; Laura Traets	Bulgaria	19.200	7.600		26.800
3rd place, bronze medalist(s)	Hanna Haidukevich; Anastasiya Rybakova; Hanna Shvaiba; Arina Tsitsilina; Karyna Yarmolenka	Belarus	18.400	7.750		26.150
4	Anna Basta; Martina Centofanti; Agnese Duranti; Alessia Maurelli; Martina Santandrea	Italy	17.300	7.525		24.825
5	Laurabell Kabrits; Vasilina Kuksova; Arina Okamanchuk; Carmely Reiska; Lera Teino	Estonia	17.000	7.300		24.300
6	Alina Bykhno; Tetiana Dovzhenko; Diana Myzherytska; Anastasiya Voznyak; Valeriya Yuzviak	Ukraine	16.300	5.500		21.800
7	Diana Ahmadbayli; Ayshan Bayramova; Zeynab Hummatova; Aliya Pashayeva; Darya Sorokina	Azerbaijan	15.400	5.300		20.700
8	Victoria Cuadrillero; Clara Esquerdo; Ana Gayán; Alba Polo; Sara Salarrullana	Spain	14.400	5.750		20.150
