= Gymnastics at the 2019 European Games – Women's rhythmic group 3 hoops and 4 clubs =

Women's rhythmic group 3 hoops and 4 clubs at the 2019 European Games
- Venue: Minsk-Arena
- Date: 23 June
- Competitors: 40 from 8 nations
- Winning score: 26.450

Medalists
gold medal	Hanna Haidukevich; Anastasiya Rybakova; Hanna Shvaiba; Arina Tsitsilina; Karyna Yarmolenka	Belarus
silver medal	Alina Bykhno; Tetiana Dovzhenko; Diana Myzherytska; Anastasiya Voznyak; Valeriya Yuzviak	Ukraine
bronze medal	Simona Dyankova; Stefani Kiryakova; Madlen Radukanova; Erika Zafirova; Laura Traets	Bulgaria

The women's rhythmic group 3 hoops and 4 clubs competition at the 2019 European Games was held at the Minsk-Arena on 23 June 2019.

== Results ==
Rank	Gymnast	Nation	D Score	E Score	Pen.	Total
1st place, gold medalist(s)	Hanna Haidukevich; Anastasiya Rybakova; Hanna Shvaiba; Arina Tsitsilina; Karyna Yarmolenka	Belarus	18.200	8.250		26.450
2nd place, silver medalist(s)	Alina Bykhno; Tetiana Dovzhenko; Diana Myzherytska; Anastasiya Voznyak; Valeriya Yuzviak	Ukraine	18.200	8.175		26.375
3rd place, bronze medalist(s)	Simona Dyankova; Stefani Kiryakova; Madlen Radukanova; Erika Zafirova; Laura Traets	Bulgaria	17.500	8.250		25.750
4	Anna Basta; Martina Centofanti; Agnese Duranti; Alessia Maurelli; Martina Santandrea	Italy	17.000	8.550		25.550
5	Vera Biryukova; Anastasia Maksimova; Anastasia Shishmakova; Anzhelika Stubailo; Maria Tolkacheva	Russia	17.700	6.700		24.400
6	Diana Ahmadbayli; Ayshan Bayramova; Zeynab Hummatova; Aliya Pashayeva; Darya Sorokina	Azerbaijan	16.600	7.675		24.275
7	Victoria Cuadrillero; Clara Esquerdo; Ana Gayán; Alba Polo; Sara Salarrullana	Spain	15.900	5.700		21.600
8	Laurabell Kabrits; Vasilina Kuksova; Arina Okamanchuk; Carmely Reiska; Lera Teino	Estonia	15.600	5.750	–0.900	20.450
