= Gymnastics at the 2019 European Games – Women's rhythmic group all-around =

Women's rhythmic group all-around at the 2019 European Games
- Venue: Minsk-Arena
- Date: 23 June
- Competitors: 40 from 8 nations
- Winning score: 52.600

Medalists
gold medal	Hanna Haidukevich; Anastasiya Rybakova; Hanna Shvaiba; Arina Tsitsilina; Karyna Yarmolenka	Belarus
silver medal	Simona Dyankova; Stefani Kiryakova; Madlen Radukanova; Erika Zafirova; Laura Traets	Bulgaria
bronze medal	Vera Biryukova; Anastasia Maksimova; Anastasia Shishmakova; Anzhelika Stubailo; Maria Tolkacheva	Russia

The women's rhythmic group all-around competition at the 2019 European Games was held at the Minsk-Arena on 23 June 2019.

== Results ==
Rank	Gymnast	Nation	5	3 + 2	Total
1st place, gold medalist(s)	Hanna Haidukevich; Anastasiya Rybakova; Hanna Shvaiba; Arina Tsitsilina; Karyna Yarmolenka	Belarus	26.150 (3)	26.450 (1)	52.600
2nd place, silver medalist(s)	Simona Dyankova; Stefani Kiryakova; Madlen Radukanova; Erika Zafirova; Laura Traets	Bulgaria	26.800 (2)	25.700 (3)	52.550
3rd place, bronze medalist(s)	Vera Biryukova; Anastasia Maksimova; Anastasia Shishmakova; Anzhelika Stubailo; Maria Tolkacheva	Russia	27.300 (1)	24.400 (5)	51.700
4	Anna Basta; Martina Centofanti; Agnese Duranti; Alessia Maurelli; Martina Santandrea	Italy	24.825 (4)	25.550 (4)	50.375
5	Alina Bykhno; Tetiana Dovzhenko; Diana Myzherytska; Anastasiya Voznyak; Valeriya Yuzviak	Ukraine	21.800 (6)	26.375 (2)	48.175
6	Diana Ahmadbayli; Ayshan Bayramova; Zeynab Hummatova; Aliya Pashayeva; Darya Sorokina	Azerbaijan	20.700 (7)	24.275 (6)	44.975
7	Laurabell Kabrits; Vasilina Kuksova; Arina Okamanchuk; Carmely Reiska; Lera Teino	Estonia	24.300 (5)	20.450 (8)	44.750
8	Victoria Cuadrillero; Clara Esquerdo; Ana Gayán; Alba Polo; Sara Salarrullana	Spain	20.150 (8)	21.600 (7)	41.750
