= Alisa Tishchenko =

Russian rhythmic gymnast

- Born: 17 February 2004 (age 22) Krasnodar, Russia

Gymnastics career
- Discipline: Rhythmic gymnastics
- Country represented: Russia (2019-)
- Head coaches: Elena Serebryakova, Svetlana Zhuravel
Medal record
Group Rhythmic Gymnastics
International gymnastics competitions
Event	1st	2nd	3rd
Olympic Games	0	1	0
World Championships	3	1	0
Junior World Championships	4	0	0
Junior European Championships	4	0	0
Total	11	2	0
Representing (Russia) ROC
Olympic Games
Silver medal – second place	2020 Tokyo	Group All-around
Representing RGF
World Championships
Gold medal – first place	2021 Kitakyushu	Team
Gold medal – first place	2021 Kitakyushu	Group All-around
Gold medal – first place	2021 Kitakyushu	5 Balls
Silver medal – second place	2021 Kitakyushu	3 Hoops + 4 Clubs
Representing Russia
Junior World Championships
Gold medal – first place	2019 Moscow	Team
Gold medal – first place	2019 Moscow	Group All-Around
Gold medal – first place	2019 Moscow	5 Hoops
Gold medal – first place	2019 Moscow	5 Ribbons
Junior European Championships
Gold medal – first place	2019 Baku	Team
Gold medal – first place	2019 Baku	Group All-Around
Gold medal – first place	2019 Baku	5 Hoops
Gold medal – first place	2019 Baku	5 Ribbons

Alisa Sergeyevna Tishchenko (Russian: Алиса Сергеевна Тищенко, IPA: [ɐˈlʲisə ˈtʲiɕːɪnkə]; born 17 February 2004) is a Russian group rhythmic gymnast. She is the silver medalist and group Olympic runner-up at the Tokyo 2020 Olympic Games, along with Anastasia Bliznyuk, Anastasia Maksimova, Angelina Shkatova and Anastasia Tatareva. She is the 2019 World Junior Group All-Around, Team, 5 Hoops and 5 Ribbons champion and the 2019 European Junior Group All-Around, Team, 5 Hoops and 5 Ribbons champion.

== Career ==
=== Junior ===
Alisa was born in Surgut on 17 February 2004. Her mother encouraged her to begin training rhythmic gymnastics at age 6. In 2017, she moved to Moscow and was invited to train with junior national team. She was a member of Russian Group that competed at the 2019 World Junior Championships in Moscow, Russia taking the gold medal scoring a total of (49.550) ahead of Italy (45.100) and Belarus (43.100) in the all-around competition. They also won gold medals in team competition and in both apparatus finals.

=== Senior ===
In 2020, Alisa was added to Russian National Reserve Team as a senior group gymnast. Reserve group took part in Grand Prix Tartu in February. Alisa and her teammates placed second in Group All-Around competition after Uzbekistan and took gold medals in both Apparatus Finals. In October, Russian Federation organized 2nd Online Tournament in rhythmic gymnastics, where reserve group won in Group All-Around competition (69.050) in front of Uzbekistan. In 2021, Alisa was admitted to compete in the 2021 Moscow Grand Prix, as a member of the official Russian group, where Russia placed first in the All round ahead of Belarus. On July 5, 2021, the Russian Federation announced that Alisa Tishchenko was selected to represent Russia at the 2020 Olympic Games in Tokyo, Japan, (leaving out Karina Metelkova and Olya Karaseva) as a member of the Russian group formed by Anastasia Tatareva, Anastasia Bliznyuk, Anastasia Maksimova and Angelina Shkatova, and that the Russian group will compete in the Moscow 2021 World Challenge Cup on July 9–11. In the Moscow Cup, the Russian group took gold in all aspects ahead of Japan and all possible golds in the apparatus finals ahead of Uzbekistan. From August 7–8, the Russian group competed in the 2020 Olympic Games where they achieved the silver medal in the general competition behind Bulgaria, and it is the first time in 25 years that Russia has lost the first place and the gold medal in the Olympic Games. From October 29–31, Alisa competed in the 2021 Rhythmic Gymnastics World Championships, in Kitakyushu, Japan, along with the ensemble formed by Anastasia Bliznyuk, Maria Tolkacheva, Polina Orlova and Angelina Shkatova, where the Russian ensemble won gold in the entire contest, for the fifth time in a row, ahead of Italy and Belarus.

== Detailed Olympic results ==
Year	Competition Description	Location	Music	Apparatus	Rank	Score-Final	Rank	Score-Qualifying
2020	Olympics	Tokyo		All-around	2nd	90.700	2nd	89.050
2020	Olympics	Tokyo	Prince Igor: Polovetskie tancy s khorom by Symphony Orchestra of State Moscow	5 Balls	2nd	46.200	2nd	45.750
2020	Olympics	Tokyo	Ruslan and Liudmila by State Symphony Orchestra of USSR	3 Hoops + 4 Clubs	2nd	44.500	3rd	43.300
