= Angelina Shkatova =

Russian rhythmic gymnast

- Born: 25 January 2001 (age 25) Vladimir, Russia

Gymnastics career
- Discipline: Rhythmic gymnastics
- Country represented: Russia (2019–2021)
- Gym: Novogorsk
- Head coach: Irina Viner
- Assistant coach: Tatiana Sergaeva
Medal record
Representing (Russia) ROC
Olympic Games
Silver medal – second place	2020 Tokyo	Group All-around
Representing RGF
World Championships
Gold medal – first place	2021 Kitakyushu	Team
Gold medal – first place	2021 Kitakyushu	Group All-around
Gold medal – first place	2021 Kitakyushu	5 Balls
Silver medal – second place	2021 Kitakyushu	3 Hoops + 4 Clubs
Representing Russia
European Championships
Gold medal – first place	2021 Varna	Team
Gold medal – first place	2021 Varna	Group All-around
Silver medal – second place	2021 Varna	5 Balls
Summer Universiade
Gold medal – first place	2019 Naples	Group All-around
Gold medal – first place	2019 Naples	5 Balls
Gold medal – first place	2019 Naples	3 Hoops + 4 Clubs
Junior European Championships
Gold medal – first place	2015 Minsk	Group All-around
Silver medal – second place	2015 Minsk	5 Balls

Angelina Anatolyevna Shkatova (Russian: Ангелина Анатольевна Шкатова, IPA: [ɐnɡʲɪˈlʲinə ˈʂkatəvə]; born 25 January 2001) is a Russian group rhythmic gymnast. She is the 2021 European Group All-around champion and the 2015 European Junior Group All-around champion.

== Personal life ==
In February 2025, she married Viacheslav Malafeev, a Russian football official and former player. She gave birth to their child, a son named Alexander, on August 15 the same year.

== Career ==
=== Junior ===
Shkatova was selected to represent Russia alongside Ekaterina Fedorova, Anastasia Kalabina, Mariia Kravtsova and Ksenia Polyakova at the 2015 Junior European Championships in Minsk, Belarus. They won gold medal in Group all-around and silver in 5 Balls final.

=== Senior ===
She was part of Russian group from St. Petersburg that took three gold medals (Group All-around, 5 Balls, 3 Hoops + 4 Clubs) at the 2019 Summer Universiade in Naples, Italy.

In 2020, she was invited to join the main Russian national group. Her first major competition with the new squad was Grand Prix Moscow in February. They won gold medal in Group All-around (64.250) in front of Belarus (61.250) and Israel (57.400).

In 2021, she started the season at Grand Prix Moscow, where they took gold medal in Group All-around (80.900) in front of Belarus (74.650) and Uzbekistan (73.500). In the end of May, she competed at the 2021 Pesaro World Cup, where she won gold medal in Group All-around and two silver medals in Apparatus finals. On July 5, 2021, the Russian Federation announced that Shkatova was selected to represent Russia at the 2020 Olympic Games in Tokyo, Japan, as a member of the Russian group formed by Anastasia Tatareva, Anastasia Bliznyuk, Anastasia Maksimova and Alisa Tishchenko. At the 2021 Moscow World Challenge Cup, the Russian group took gold in all aspects ahead of Japan and all possible golds in the apparatus finals ahead of Uzbekistan. From August 7 to 8, the Russian group competed in the 2020 Olympics where they achieved the silver medal in general competition behind Bulgaria, and it is the first time in 25 years that Russia has lost the first place and the gold medal at the Olympics.

On October 29-31, she competed at the 2021 Rhythmic Gymnastics World Championships, in Kitakyushu, Japan, together with the team formed by Alisa Tishchenko, Maria Tolkacheva, Polina Orlova and Anastasia Bliznyuk and won gold in the team competition for the fifth time in a row, ahead of Italy and Belarus. They also won team gold (along with individuals, Dina and Arina Averina), gold in the 5-ball final, and silver (behind Italy) in the mixed final.

== Detailed Olympic results ==
Year	Competition Description	Location	Music	Apparatus	Rank	Score-Final	Rank	Score-Qualifying
2020	Olympics	Tokyo		All-around	2nd	90.700	2nd	89.050
2020	Olympics	Tokyo	Prince Igor: Polovetskie tancy s khorom by Symphony Orchestra of State Moscow	5 Balls	2nd	46.200	2nd	45.750
2020	Olympics	Tokyo	Ruslan and Liudmila by State Symphony Orchestra of USSR	3 Hoops + 4 Clubs	2nd	44.500	3rd	43.300
