= Anastasia Bliznyuk =

Russian rhythmic gymnast

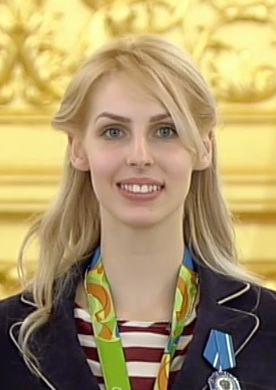
- Bliznyuk in 2016

Personal information
- Full name: Anastasia Ilyinichna Bliznyuk
- Alternative name: Anastasia Bliznyuk
- Born: 28 June 1994 (age 32) Zaporizhia, Ukraine
- Height: 173 cm (5 ft 8 in)

Gymnastics career
- Discipline: Rhythmic gymnastics
- Country represented: Russia & ROC (2011-2013, 2016-2018, 2021)
- Club: MGFSO
- Gym: Novogorsk
- Head coach: Irina Viner
- Assistant coach: Tatiana Sergaeva
Medal record
Group Rhythmic Gymnastics
International gymnastics competitions
Event	1st	2nd	3rd
Olympic Games	2	1	0
World Championships	6	2	1
European Championships	7	1	1
Summer Universiade	3	0	0
Total	15	4	2
Representing ROC
Olympic Games
Silver medal – second place	2020 Tokyo	Group All-around
Representing RGF
World Championships
Gold medal – first place	2021 Kitakyushu	Team
Gold medal – first place	2021 Kitakyushu	Group All-around
Gold medal – first place	2021 Kitakyushu	5 Balls
Silver medal – second place	2021 Kitakyushu	3 Hoops + 4 Clubs
Representing Russia
Olympic Games
Gold medal – first place	2012 London	Group All-around
Gold medal – first place	2016 Rio de Janeiro	Group All-around
World Championships
Gold medal – first place	2013 Kyiv	2 Ribbon + 3 Balls
Gold medal – first place	2017 Pesaro	Group All-around
Gold medal – first place	2017 Pesaro	3 Balls + 2 Ropes
Silver medal – second place	2017 Pesaro	5 Hoops
Bronze medal – third place	2013 Kyiv	Group All-around
European Championships
Gold medal – first place	2012 Nizhny Novgorod	Group All-around
Gold medal – first place	2012 Nizhny Novgorod	5 Balls
Gold medal – first place	2016 Holon	Group All-around
Gold medal – first place	2018 Guadalajara	Team
Gold medal – first place	2018 Guadalajara	Group All-around
Gold medal – first place	2021 Varna	Team
Gold medal – first place	2021 Varna	Group All-around
Silver medal – second place	2021 Varna	5 Balls
Bronze medal – third place	2018 Guadalajara	5 Hoops
Summer Universiade
Gold medal – first place	2013 Kazan	Group All-around
Gold medal – first place	2013 Kazan	10 Clubs
Gold medal – first place	2013 Kazan	2 Ribbon + 3 Balls

Anastasia Ilyinichna Bliznyuk (Russian: Анастасия Ильинична Близнюк, IPA: [ɐnəstɐˈsʲijə blʲɪˈzʲnʲuk]; born 28 June 1994) is a Russian rhythmic gymnast and coach. She is a two-time Group All-around champion at the 2012 and 2016 Olympics, silver medalist at the 2020 Olympics, world champion at the 2017 World Rhythmic Gymnastics Championships, bronze medalist at the 2013 World Rhythmic Gymnastics Championships, and three-time European champion at the 2012, 2016 and 2018 Rhythmic Gymnastics European Championships.

She is the third group rhythmic gymnast to win two gold medals in the Olympic Games after the late Natalia Lavrova and Yelena Posevina, and the only rhythmic gymnast to win three medals in the Olympic Games.

== Career ==
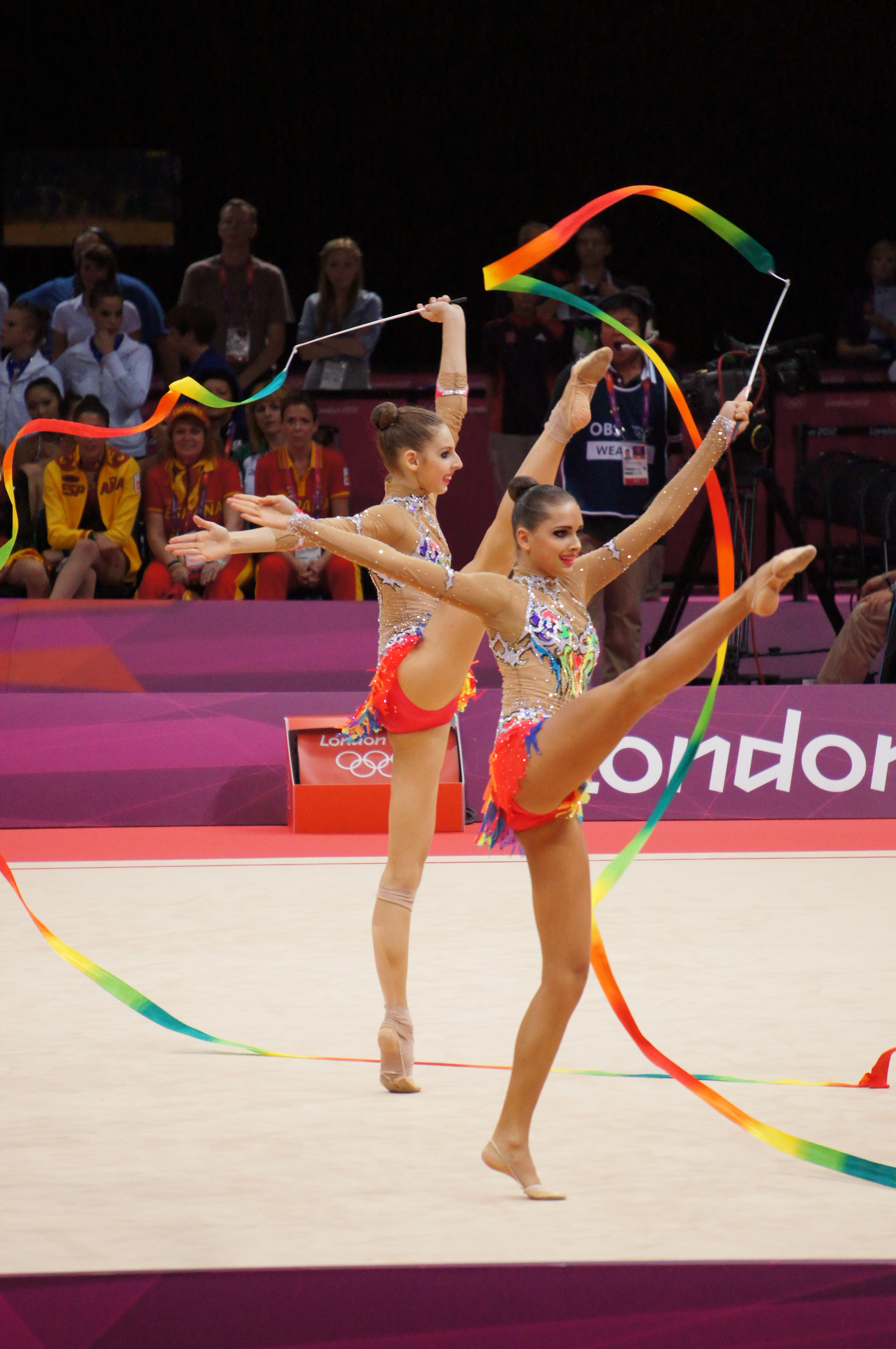
Bliznyuk (left) and Sevastyanova in the 3 Ribbons + 2 Hoops final in 2012 Summer Olympics

Bliznyuk was part of the gold medal winning Russian Group at the 2012 European Championships and at the World Cup Final in Minsk, Belarus. She won a gold medal at the 2012 Summer Olympics in the group all-around event together with other group members (Uliana Donskova, Ksenia Dudkina, Alina Makarenko, Anastasia Nazarenko, Karolina Sevastyanova).

For six months leading up to the Olympic Games, the Russian gymnasts only ate buckwheat in their diet. Bliznyuk is a resident of the city of Penza.

Bliznyuk suffered an injury at the start of the 2013 season and was not selected to compete with the Russian Group, she returned to competition in the Russian Group at the 2013 Sofia World Cup where they won the silver medal in all-around and gold in 2 ribbons/3 balls final. At the Minsk World Cup they won gold in all-around, silver in 2 ribbons/3 balls and bronze in 10 clubs. Bliznyuk and the rest Russian Group won all the gold medals at the 2013 Summer Universiade in All-around, 10 clubs and 2 ribbons/3 balls. The Russian Group won the gold medals in Group All-around, 10 clubs and 2 ribbons/3 balls at the 2013 World Cup Final in St. Petersburg, Russia. Bliznyuk and her Russian teammates won the Group All-around bronze medal at the 2013 World Championships, they won gold in 2 Ribbon + 3 Balls final. Bliznyuk along with rest of the remaining Russian Group Olympians terminated their careers after the World Championships. Irina Viner stated about their dismissal and retirements: "We have made drastic changes in the composition of the group. All the girls, who a year ago at the Olympic Games were the first after the World Cup series had to say goodbye to the sport. They did not show in Kyiv what could and should have been shown. The "star disease" should not be left on the carpet. And I always say that as long as you're standing on a pedestal - you're a winner, but as soon as you had gone down from it - you're no one to call you in any way".

In 2014 Bliznyuk suffered an infection and spent about six weeks in recovery. After returning to health, she switched to a coaching role with a Russian reserve team. She came back to training in 2015.

In 2016, Bliznyuk made a competitive comeback, she was included in the Russian group and returned to competition at the 2016 Moscow Grand Prix. She also began competing at the 2016 FIG World Cup series events. Bliznyuk and the Russian group won group gold at the 2016 European Championships in Holon, Israel.

On August 19–21, Bliznyuk was member of the golden winning Russian group (together with Anastasia Maksimova, Maria Tolkacheva, Vera Biryukova, Anastasiia Tatareva) that won gold at the 2016 Summer Olympics held in Rio de Janeiro, Brazil. Bliznyuk achieved a rare feat by becoming only the third group rhythmic gymnast to win two gold medals in the Olympic Games after the late Natalia Lavrova and Yelena Posevina.

In 2017, Bliznyuk continued her competitive career and stayed with the Russian national group where she became the team captain. They competed at the 2017 Grand Prix Moscow where they won gold in group all-around, 3 balls + 2 ropes and silver medal in 5 hoops. They participated at the 2017 Pesaro World Cup finished 4th in all-around and qualified in 1 apparatus final, winning silver with 3 balls and 2 ropes. Then they also competeted at the 2017 Tashkent World Cup winning gold in all-around and qualified in all apparatuses finals, winning gold with hoops and bronze with balls and ropes. She and her team participated at The Alina Festival. They participated at the 2017 Portimao World Cup : they made a sweep of silvers behind Italy. They competed at the 2017 Grand Prix Holon winning silver in the all-around competition and golds in the events final. They also participated at the 2017 Guadalajara World Cup winning gold in all-around and with balls and ropes. They also competed at the 2017 Berlin World Cup and made a sweep of golds. They made their last World Cup at the 2017 Kazan World Cup and made a second sweep of golds, in a row. At the 2017 World Championships in Pesaro, they won Gold in all-around and with balls and ropes, and silver with hoops.

In 2018, Bliznyuk began her season at the 2018 Grand Prix Moscow: they won gold in group all-around, 3 balls + 2 ropes and silver medal in 5 hoops. She suffered an injury but she came back at the 2018 Grand Prix Holon winning gold in all-around and with balls and ropes. They competed at the 2018 European Championships in Guadalajara, Spain winning gold in the all-around competition and bronze with 5 hoops.

On July 5, 2021, the Russian Federation announced that Bliznyuk was selected to represent Russia at the Tokyo 2020 Olympic Games, (its third Olympic Games) as a member of the Russian group formed by Anastasia Tatareva, Alisa Tishchenko, Anastasia Maksimova and Angelina Shkatova, and that the Russian group will compete in the World Challenge Cup Moscow 2021 from July 9 to 11. At the Moscow Cup, the Russian group took gold in all respects ahead of Japan and all possible golds in the apparatus finals ahead of Uzbekistan. From August 7 to 8, the Russian group competed in the 2020 Olympics where they achieved the silver medal in general competition behind Bulgaria, and it is the first time in 25 years that Russia has lost the first place and the gold medal at the Olympics.

From October 29 to 31, she competed in the 2021 Rhythmic Gymnastics World Championships, in Kitakyushu, Japan, (her third world championship) together with the team formed by Alisa Tishchenko, Maria Tolkacheva, Polina Orlova and Angelina Shkatova and won gold in the team competition for the fifth time in a row, ahead of Italy and Belarus. They also won team gold (along with individuals, Dina and Arina Averina), gold in the 5-ball final, and silver (behind Italy) in the mixed final.

== Coaching career ==
Since late 2022, Bliznyuk has been serving as a technique coach under fellow gymnast Sun Dan for the Chinese national rhythmic gymnastics team, who won gold medal in Group All-around Final at the 2024 Summer Olympic Games.

== Detailed Olympic results ==
Year	Competition Description	Location	Music	Apparatus	Rank	Score-Final	Rank	Score-Qualifying
2020	Olympics	Tokyo		All-around	2nd	90.700	2nd	89.050
2020	Olympics	Tokyo	Prince Igor: Polovetskie tancy s khorom Symphony Orchestra of State Moscow	5 Balls	2nd	46.200	2nd	45.750
2020	Olympics	Tokyo	Ruslan and Liudmila by State Symphony Orchestra of USSR	3 Hoops + 4 Clubs	2nd	44.500	3rd	43.300
2016	Olympics	Rio de Janeiro		All-around	1st	36.233	2nd	35.516
2016	Olympics	Rio de Janeiro	L'adoration De La Terre, Le Sacrifice - Danse Sacrale, Time, Forward! Igor Stravinsky, Moscow New Choir, Elena Rastvora, Russian Philharmonic Symphony Orchestra & Alexander Vedernikov	6 Clubs / 2 Hoops	1st	18.633	6th	17.233
2016	Olympics	Rio de Janeiro	Samba do Brasil, Those Were The Days by Bellini, Gruppa Na-Na	5 Ribbons	3rd	17.600	1st	18.283
2012	Olympics	London		All-around	1st	57.000	1st	56.375
2012	Olympics	London	Giselle by Adolphe Adams	5 Balls	1st	28.700	1st	28.375
2012	Olympics	London	( Knock on Wood / Tough Lover / At Last / Oye ) by Safri Duo / Christina Aguilera / Kenny G / Gloria Estefan	3 Ribbons + 2 Hoops	1st	28.300	1st	28.000
