= Polina Orlova =

Russian rhythmic gymnast (born 2002)

Polina Sergeevna Orlova
- Born: 24 December 2002 (age 23) Pushkino, Russia

Gymnastics career
- Discipline: Rhythmic gymnastics
- Country represented: Russia (2018-)
- Head coaches: Irina Viner, Olga Nazarova
Medal record
Group Rhythmic Gymnastics
Representing RGF
World Championships
Gold medal – first place	2021 Kitakyushu	Team
Gold medal – first place	2021 Kitakyushu	Group All-around
Gold medal – first place	2021 Kitakyushu	5 Balls
Silver medal – second place	2021 Kitakyushu	3 Hoops + 4 Clubs

Polina Sergeyevna Orlova (Russian: Полина Сергеевна Орлова; born 24 December 2002) is a Russian group rhythmic gymnast. She is the 2021 World Group All-around champion.

== Career ==
She started training rhythmic gymnastics at age four in her hometown Pushkino, Moscow.

She competed at several international tournaments as individual and switched to group in 2020. After being in reserve team, she was selected to compete at the 2021 World Championships as a member of Russian national group. Together with Alisa Tishchenko, Anastasia Bliznyuk, Angelina Shkatova and Maria Tolkacheva, she won gold medals in Group All-around and Team event.
