= Arina Tsitsilina =

Belarusian rhythmic gymnast

- Full name: Arina Alexandrovna Tsitsilina
- Alternative name: Aryna Aliaksandrauna Tsytsylina
- Born: 9 October 1998 (age 27) Barnaul, Russia
- Height: 1.73 m (5 ft 8 in)

Gymnastics career
- Discipline: Rhythmic gymnastics
- Country represented: Belarus (2014 – present)
- Club: Republican Centre of Olympic Training
- Head coach: Tatiana Nenasheva
- Assistant coach: Katsiaryna Bialiauskaya
- Choreographer: Volha Strakhava
Medal record
Representing Belarus
Group rhythmic gymnastics
World Championships
Bronze medal – third place	2014 Izmir	Group All-Around
Bronze medal – third place	2014 Izmir	10 Clubs
Bronze medal – third place	2014 Izmir	3 Balls + 2 Ribbons
Bronze medal – third place	2021 Kitakyushu	Team
Bronze medal – third place	2021 Kitakyushu	Group All-Around
European Games
Gold medal – first place	2019 Minsk	Group All-Around
Gold medal – first place	2019 Minsk	3 Hoops + 4 Clubs
Gold medal – first place	2015 Baku	6 Clubs + 2 Hoops
Bronze medal – third place	2019 Minsk	5 Balls
Bronze medal – third place	2015 Baku	Group All-Around
European Championships
Gold medal – first place	2016 Holon	5 Ribbons
Silver medal – second place	2016 Holon	Group All-Around
Silver medal – second place	2021 Varna	Team

Arina Alexandrovna Tsitsilina (Belarusian: Арына Аляксандраўна Цыцыліна; Russian: Арина Александровна Цицилина; born 9 October 1998) is a Russian-born group rhythmic gymnast representing Belarus. She is a five-time World bronze medalist and the 2016 European champion in 5 ribbons. She also is the 2016 European group all-around silver medalist and the 2021 European team silver medalist. She represented Belarus at the 2016 and the 2020 Summer Olympics finishing fifth in the group all-around both times. She is the 2015 European Games 6 Clubs + 2 Hoops champion and the 2019 European Games group all-around and 3 hoops + 4 clubs champion.

== Career ==
Tsitsilina began rhythmic gymnastics when she was three years old. In 2013, she was noticed at a competition in Spain by Olympic champion and Belarusian coach Marina Lobatch. Lobatch invited Tsitsilina to train in Belarus, so she moved to Minsk and joined the Belarusian national team group.

=== 2014–2015 ===
Tsitsilina competed at her first European Championships in 2014. In the group all-around final, Belarus only finished seventeenth overall after making major mistakes in their 3 balls + 2 ribbons routine. They then finished fourth in the ten clubs final. She then competed at the World Championships alongside Ksenya Cheldishkina, Hanna Dudzenkova, Maria Kadobina, Maryia Katsiak, and Valeriya Pischelina. In the group all-around final, they won the bronze medal behind Bulgaria and Italy. They then won bronze medals in both apparatus finals.

Tsitsilina represented Belarus at the 2015 European Games where the Belarusian group won the gold medal in the 6 clubs + 2 hoops final. They also won a bronze medal in the group all-around behind Russia and Israel. She then competed at the 2015 World Championships and helped the Belarusian group finish fourth in 6 clubs + 2 hoops and seventh in the group all-around.

=== 2016 ===
Tsitsilina won a gold medal in 5 ribbons and a silver medal in the group all-around at the European Championships in Holon, Israel. At the Kazan World Challenge Cup, the Belarusian group won a silver medal in the 6 clubs + 2 hoops final behind Russia. She was selected to represent Belarus at the 2016 Summer Olympics alongside Maria Kadobina, Hanna Dudzenkova, Maryia Katsiak, and Valeriya Pischelina. They finished outside of medals in the group all-around final with a fifth-place score of 35.299.

=== 2017 ===
Tsitsilina competed with Hanna Shvaiba, Alina Sevastsyanava, Hanna Haidukevich, Ksenya Cheldishkina, and Marharyta Avadzinskaya at the Tashkent World Cup where they won the bronze medal in the group all-around behind Russia and Bulgaria. They also finished fourth in both apparatus finals. The same group then competed at the Baku World Cup where they won the silver medal in 5 hoops and the bronze medal in 3 balls + 2 ropes behind Ukraine and Bulgaria. Then at the Sofia World Cup, the group won the bronze medals in the all-around and in both apparatus finals. At the World Championships, the Belarusian group finished fifth in the group all-around and in both apparatus finals.

=== 2019 ===
Tsitsilina and the Belarusian group won the gold medal in the 5 balls final at the 2019 Sofia World Cup. She was selected to represent Belarus at the 2019 European Games alongside Anastasiya Rybakova, Hanna Shvaiba, Hanna Haidukevich, Karyna Yarmolenka. They won the gold medal in the group all-around by 0.050 ahead of Bulgaria. They also won the gold medal in the 3 hoops + 4 clubs final. In the 5 balls final, they won the bronze medal behind Russia and Bulgaria. She then competed at the World Championships in Baku where the Belarusian group finished fourth in the all-around. They also finished fourth in the 3 hoops + 4 clubs final and seventh in the 5 balls final.

=== 2021 ===
Tsitsilina competed at the Tashkent World Cup where the Belarusian group won the all-around bronze medal behind Uzbekistan and Israel. They won the silver medal in the 5 balls final behind Uzbekistan, and in the 3 hoops + 4 clubs behind Israel. She won a group all-around bronze medal at the Baku World Cup behind Bulgaria and Italy. They also won the bronze medal in the 3 hoops + 4 clubs final and placed fourth in the 5 balls. She then competed at the European Championships and won a silver medal in the team competition with the senior group and individuals Alina Harnasko and Anastasiia Salos. The Belarusian group finished fourth in the all-around and in 5 balls and finished eighth in 3 hoops + 4 clubs.

Tsitsilina was selected to represent Belarus at the 2020 Summer Olympics alongside Hanna Haidukevich, Anastasiya Malakanava, Anastasiya Rybakova, Karyna Yarmolenka. In the qualification round, the group finished in eighth and qualified for the final spot in the final. Then in the group all-around final, the group improved to finish in fifth place. The same group then competed at the 2021 World Championships in Kitakyushu, Japan. They won the group all-around bronze medal behind Italy and Russia. This marked the first time Belarus won a World group all-around medal since 2014. In the apparatus finals, they finished fourth in 5 balls and eighth in 3 hoops + 4 clubs. The Belarusian team of Alina Harnasko, Anastasiia Salos, and the senior group won the team bronze medal behind Russia and Italy.

=== 2022 ===
Tsitsilina did not compete in any international competitions in 2022 due to the International Gymnastics Federation banning Russian and Belarusian athletes due to the 2022 Russian invasion of Ukraine.
