= Hanna Haidukevich =

Belarusian rhythmic gymnast

- Full name: Hanna Viktarauna Haidukevich
- Alternative name: Anna Gaidukevich
- Nickname: Anya
- Born: 26 March 2001 (age 25) Minsk, Belarus
- Height: 176 cm (5 ft 9 in)

Gymnastics career
- Discipline: Rhythmic gymnastics
- Country represented: Belarus (2017-present)
- Club: Republican Centre of Olympic Training
- Head coach: Tatiana Nenasheva
- Assistant coach: Irina Leparskaya
- Choreographer: Volha Strakhava
Medal record
Representing Belarus
Group rhythmic gymnastics
World Championships
Bronze medal – third place	2021 Kitakyushu	Team
Bronze medal – third place	2021 Kitakyushu	Group All-around
European Games
Gold medal – first place	2019 Minsk	Group all-around
Gold medal – first place	2019 Minsk	3 Hoops + 4 Clubs
Bronze medal – third place	2019 Minsk	5 Balls
European Championships
Silver medal – second place	2021 Varna	Team

Hanna Viktarauna Haidukevich (Belarusian: Ганна Віктараўна Гайдукевіч; born 26 March 2001) is a Belarusian group rhythmic gymnast. She is the 2021 World team and group all-around bronze medalist. She is the 2019 European Games group all-around and 3 hoops + 4 clubs champion and the 2021 European Championships team silver medalist. She represented Belarus at the 2020 Summer Olympics and finished fifth in the group all-around.

== Career ==
Haidukevich began rhythmic gymnastics when she was four years old.

=== 2017 ===
Haidukevich became age eligible for senior international competitions in 2017. She competed with Hanna Shvaiba, Alina Sevastsyanava, Arina Tsitsilina, Ksenya Cheldishkina, and Marharyta Avadzinskaya at the Tashkent World Cup where they won the bronze medal in the group all-around behind Russia and Bulgaria. They also finished fourth in both apparatus finals. The same group then competed at the Baku World Cup where they won the silver medal in 5 hoops and the bronze medal in 3 balls + 2 ropes behind Ukraine and Bulgaria. Then at the Sofia World Cup, the group won the bronze medals in the all-around and in both apparatus finals. At the World Championships, the Belarusian group finished fifth in the group all-around and in both apparatus finals.

=== 2018 ===
Haidukevich competed at the European Championships where the Belarusian team finished in fifth place. The Belarusian group finished sixth in the group all-around, fifth in the 5 hoops final, and fourth in the 3 balls + 2 ropes final. She then competed at the World Championships alongside Lalita Matskevich, Dziyana Misiuchenka, Anastasiya Rybakova, Hanna Shvaiba. They finished sixth in the group all-around final, eighth in the 5 hoops final, and fifth in the 3 balls + 2 ropes final.

=== 2019 ===
Haidukevich and the Belarusian group won the gold medal in the 5 balls final at the Sofia World Cup. She was selected to represent Belarus at the 2019 European Games alongside Anastasiya Rybakova, Hanna Shvaiba, Arina Tsitsilina, Karyna Yarmolenka. They won the gold medal in the group all-around by 0.050 ahead of Bulgaria. They also won the gold medal in the 3 hoops + 4 clubs final. In the 5 balls final, they won the bronze medal behind Russia and Bulgaria. She then competed at the World Championships in Baku where the Belarusian group finished fourth in the all-around. They also finished fourth in the 3 hoops + 4 clubs final and seventh in the 5 balls final.

=== 2021 ===
Haidukevich competed at the Tashkent World Cup where the Belarusian group won the all-around bronze medal behind Uzbekistan and Israel. They won the silver medal in the 5 balls final behind Uzbekistan, and in the 3 hoops + 4 clubs behind Israel. She won a group all-around bronze medal at the Baku World Cup behind Bulgaria and Italy. They also won the bronze medal in the 3 hoops + 4 clubs final and placed fourth in the 5 balls. She then competed at the European Championships and won a silver medal in the team competition with the senior group and individuals Alina Harnasko and Anastasiia Salos. The Belarusian group finished fourth in the all-around and in 5 balls and finished eighth in 3 hoops + 4 clubs.

Haidukevich was selected to represent Belarus at the 2020 Summer Olympics alongside Anastasiya Malakanava, Anastasiya Rybakova, Arina Tsitsilina, Karyna Yarmolenka. In the qualification round, the group finished in eighth and qualified for the final spot in the final. Then in the group all-around final, the group improved to finish in fifth place. The same group then competed at the World Championships in Kitakyushu, Japan. They won the group all-around bronze medal behind Italy and Russia. This marked the first time Belarus won a World group all-around medal since 2014. In the apparatus finals, they finished fourth in 5 balls and eighth in 3 hoops + 4 clubs. The Belarusian team of Alina Harnasko, Anastasiia Salos, and the senior group won the team bronze medal behind Russia and Italy.

=== 2022 ===
Haidukevich did not compete in any international competitions in 2022 due to the International Gymnastics Federation banning Russian and Belarusian athletes due to the 2022 Russian invasion of Ukraine.
