= Natalia Kuzmina =

Rhythmic gymnastics coach

- Наталья Ивановна Кузьмина
- Born: 27 October 1953 (age 72); Zhukovsky, Moscow Oblast, RSFSR, USSR
- Citizenship: Soviet, Russian, Japanese
- Occupations: Rhythmic gymnastics coah, head of FIG's technical committee
- Employer: Russian Rhythmic Gymnastics Federation
- Honours: Honored Coach of the USSR, Order of Honour

Natalia Kuzmina (born 27 October 1957) is a retired Russian rhythmic gymnastics coach. She is an Honored Coach of the USSR.

== Biography ==
Kuzmina has been coaching since 1974. She served as the head coach of the USSR national team from 1985 to 1992. Among Kuzmina's pupils are Marina Lobatch, Oleksandra Timoshenko, Marina Beloglazova, Oksana Skaldina and Oksana Kostina. She was awarded the Order of Honor.

Since 1992 she has been living and working in Japan. From 2013 to 2021, Natalia Kuzmina was head of the Technical Committee for Rhythmic Gymnastics at the International Gymnastics Federation. After Russia didn't win any gold medals at the 2020 Olympics for the first time since rhythmic gymnastics became an Olympic sport, Irina Viner pulled her candidancy for the next four-year period.
