= Karyna Yarmolenka =

Belarusian rhythmic gymnast

- Full name: Karyna Dzmitryeuna Yarmolenka
- Alternative name: Karina Yarmolenka
- Born: 4 May 2000 (age 26) Minsk, Belarus
- Height: 170 cm (5 ft 7 in)

Gymnastics career
- Discipline: Rhythmic gymnastics
- Country represented: Belarus (2017-)
- Club: Republican Centre of Olympic Training
- Head coach: Tatiana Nenasheva
- Assistant coach: Irina Leparskaya
- Choreographer: Volha Strakhava
Medal record
Representing Belarus
Group rhythmic gymnastics
World Championships
Bronze medal – third place	2021 Kitakyushu	Team
Bronze medal – third place	2021 Kitakyushu	Group all-around
European Games
Gold medal – first place	2019 Minsk	Group all-around
Gold medal – first place	2019 Minsk	3 Hoops + 4 Clubs
Bronze medal – third place	2019 Minsk	5 Balls
European Championships
Silver medal – second place	2021 Varna	Team
Junior European Championships
Gold medal – first place	2015 Minsk	5 Balls
Silver medal – second place	2015 Minsk	Group all-around

Karyna Dzmitryeuna Yarmolenka (Belarusian: Карына Дзмітрыеўна Ярмоленка; born 4 May 2000) is a Belarusian group rhythmic gymnast. She is the 2021 World team and group all-around bronze medalist. She won a team silver medal at the 2021 European Championships. She is the 2019 European Games group all-around and 3 hoops + 4 clubs champion. She represented Belarus at the 2020 Summer Olympics where she finished fifth in the group all-around. At the junior level, she is the 2015 European 5 balls champion and group all-around silver medalist.

== Career ==
Yarmolenka began rhythmic gymnastics in 2005.

=== Junior ===
At the 2015 Junior European Championships, Yarmolenka and the Belarusian junior group won the silver medal in the group all-around behind Russia. She then won a gold medal in the 5 balls event final.

=== Senior ===
Yarmolenka and the Belarusian group won the gold medal in the 5 balls final at the 2019 Sofia World Cup. She was selected to represent Belarus at the 2019 European Games alongside Hanna Haidukevich, Hanna Shvaiba, Arina Tsitsilina, Anastasiya Rybakova. They won the gold medal in the group all-around by 0.050 ahead of Bulgaria. They also won the gold medal in the 3 hoops + 4 clubs final. In the 5 balls final, they won the bronze medal behind Russia and Bulgaria. She then competed at the 2019 World Championships in Baku where the Belarusian group finished fourth in the all-around. They also finished fourth in the 3 hoops + 4 clubs final and seventh in the 5 balls final.

Yarmolenka competed at the 2021 Tashkent World Cup where the Belarusian group won the all-around bronze medal behind Uzbekistan and Israel. They won the silver medal in the 5 balls final behind Uzbekistan, and in the 3 hoops + 4 clubs behind Israel. She won a group all-around bronze medal at the 2021 Baku World Cup behind Bulgaria and Italy. They also won the bronze medal in the 3 hoops + 4 clubs final and placed fourth in the 5 balls. She then competed at the 2021 European Championships and won a silver medal in the team competition with the senior group and individuals Alina Harnasko and Anastasiia Salos. The Belarusian group finished fourth in the all-around and in 5 balls and finished eighth in 3 hoops + 4 clubs.

Yarmolenka was selected to represent Belarus at the 2020 Summer Olympics alongside Hanna Haidukevich, Anastasiya Malakanava, Arina Tsitsilina, Anastasiya Rybakova. In the qualification round, the group finished in eighth and qualified for the final spot in the final. Then in the group all-around final, the group improved to finish in fifth place. The same group then competed at the 2021 World Championships in Kitakyushu, Japan. They won the group all-around bronze medal behind Italy and Russia. This marked the first time Belarus won a World group all-around medal since 2014. In the apparatus finals, they finished fourth in 5 balls and eighth in 3 hoops + 4 clubs. The Belarusian team of Alina Harnasko, Anastasiia Salos, and the senior group won the team bronze medal behind Russia and Italy.
