= Anastasiya Rybakova =

Belarusian rhythmic gymnast

- Full name: Anastasiya Aliaksandrauna Rybakova
- Nickname: Nastya
- Born: 23 April 2000 (age 26) Grodno, Belarus
- Height: 175 cm (5 ft 9 in)

Gymnastics career
- Discipline: Rhythmic gymnastics
- Country represented: Belarus (2017-)
- Club: Republican Centre of Olympic Training
- Head coach: Tatiana Nenasheva
- Assistant coach: Irina Leparskaya
- Choreographer: Volha Strakhava
Medal record
Representing Belarus
Group rhythmic gymnastics
World Championships
| Bronze medal – third place | 2021 Kitakyushu | Team |
| Bronze medal – third place | 2021 Kitakyushu | Group all-around |
European Games
| Gold medal – first place | 2019 Minsk | Group all-around |
| Gold medal – first place | 2019 Minsk | 3 Hoops + 4 Clubs |
| Bronze medal – third place | 2019 Minsk | 5 Balls |
European Championships
| Silver medal – second place | 2021 Varna | Team |
Junior European Championships
| Gold medal – first place | 2015 Minsk | 5 Balls |
| Silver medal – second place | 2015 Minsk | Group all-around |
| Silver medal – second place | 2014 Baku | Team |
| Bronze medal – third place | 2014 Baku | Hoop |

Anastasiya Aliaksandrauna Rybakova (Belarusian: Настасся Аляксандраўна Рыбакова; born 23 April 2000) is a Belarusian rhythmic gymnast. She is the 2021 World team and group all-around bronze medalist. She represented Belarus at the 2020 Summer Olympics where she finished fifth in the group all-around. She won a team silver medal at the 2021 European Championships. She is the 2019 European Games group all-around and 3 hoops + 4 clubs champion. At the junior level, she is the 2015 European 5 balls champion and group all-around silver medalist.

== Career ==
=== Junior ===
Rybakova competed at the 2014 Junior European Championships as an individual gymnast. She won a team silver medal with Mariya Trubach and Stefaniya-Sofiya Manakhava behind the Russian team. Individually, she won the bronze medal in the hoop final behind Yulia Bravikova and Zhala Piriyeva. She began competing with the Belarusian junior group in 2015. At the 2015 Junior European Championships, Rybakova won the silver medal in the group all-around behind Russia. She then won a gold medal in the 5 balls event final.

=== Senior ===
Rybakova competed with the Belarusian senior group at the 2017 World Championships and finished fifth in the group all-around and in both apparatus finals.

Rybakova competed at the 2018 European Championships where the Belarusian team finished in fifth place. The Belarusian group finished sixth in the group all-around, fifth in the 5 hoops final, and fourth in the 3 balls + 2 ropes final. She then competed at the 2018 World Championships alongside Lalita Matskevich, Dziyana Misiuchenka, Hanna Haidukevich, Hanna Shvaiba. They finished sixth in the group all-around final, eighth in the 5 hoops final, and fifth in the 3 balls + 2 ropes final.

Rybakova and the Belarusian group won the gold medal in the 5 balls final at the 2019 Sofia World Cup. She was selected to represent Belarus at the 2019 European Games alongside Hanna Haidukevich, Hanna Shvaiba, Arina Tsitsilina, Karyna Yarmolenka. They won the gold medal in the group all-around by 0.050 ahead of Bulgaria. They also won the gold medal in the 3 hoops + 4 clubs final. In the 5 balls final, they won the bronze medal behind Russia and Bulgaria. She then competed at the 2019 World Championships in Baku where the Belarusian group finished fourth in the all-around. They also finished fourth in the 3 hoops + 4 clubs final and seventh in the 5 balls final.

Rybakova competed at the 2021 Tashkent World Cup where the Belarusian group won the all-around bronze medal behind Uzbekistan and Israel. They won the silver medal in the 5 balls final behind Uzbekistan, and in the 3 hoops + 4 clubs behind Israel. She won a group all-around bronze medal at the 2021 Baku World Cup behind Bulgaria and Italy. They also won the bronze medal in the 3 hoops + 4 clubs final and placed fourth in the 5 balls. She then competed at the 2021 European Championships and won a silver medal in the team competition with the senior group and individuals Alina Harnasko and Anastasiia Salos. The Belarusian group finished fourth in the all-around and in 5 balls and finished eighth in 3 hoops + 4 clubs.

Rybakova was selected to represent Belarus at the 2020 Summer Olympics alongside Hanna Haidukevich, Anastasiya Malakanava, Arina Tsitsilina, Karyna Yarmolenka. In the qualification round, the group finished in eighth and qualified for the final spot in the final. Then in the group all-around final, the group improved to finish in fifth place. The same group then competed at the 2021 World Championships in Kitakyushu, Japan. They won the group all-around bronze medal behind Italy and Russia. This marked the first time Belarus won a World group all-around medal since 2014. In the apparatus finals, they finished fourth in 5 balls and eighth in 3 hoops + 4 clubs. The Belarusian team of Alina Harnasko, Anastasiia Salos, and the senior group won the team bronze medal behind Russia and Italy.

Rybakova did not compete in any international competitions in 2022 due to the International Gymnastics Federation banning Russian and Belarusian athletes due to the 2022 Russian invasion of Ukraine.
