= Irina Viner =

Russian rhythmic gymnastics coach

- Ирина Винер
- Viner in 2019
- Born: Irina Alexandrovna Viner; 30 July 1948 (age 78); Samarkand, Uzbek SSR, Soviet Union
- Occupation: Head Coach of Russian Rhythmic Gymnastics National Team (2001-2025)
- Known for: Head Coach of the Olympic Training Center of rhythmic gymnastics in Novogorsk and coach of multiple Olympic/World champions
- Spouse: Alisher Usmanov (m. 1992; div. 2022)
- Children: Anton Viner
- Parents: Alexander Efimovich Viner (father); Zoya Zinovyevna Viner (mother)

Irina Alexandrovna Viner (Russian: Ирина Александровна Винер; born July 30, 1948), formerly Irina Alexandrovna Viner-Usmanova (Russian: Ирина Александровна Винер-Усманова), is a Russian rhythmic gymnastics coach, former head coach of the Russian national team, former president of the Russian Rhythmic Gymnastics Federation, and former vice president of the Rhythmic Gymnastics Technical Committee of the International Gymnastics Federation.

In 2015, Viner was awarded the Olympic Order in recognition of her outstanding achievements in global sports, making Viner the first gymnastics coach in history to receive the award. Thomas Bach, the president of the International Olympic Committee, personally handed her the necklace and presented the award.

Viner is one of the most successful gymnastics coaches of all time. Her pupils won five Olympic all-around golds in a row: Margarita Mamun (2016), Evgeniya Kanaeva (2008, 2012), Alina Kabaeva (2004), and Yulia Barsukova (2000).

She was married to business magnate Alisher Usmanov from 1992 until their divorce in 2022.

== Early life ==
Viner was born in Samarkand, Uzbek SSR in the Soviet Union. Her father, Alexander, was a People's Painter of Uzbekistan. Her mother, Zoya, was a doctor. Viner is Jewish, and in an interview she gave to Russian magazine Hello! at her home, she has said that she reads about Kabbalah, though she doesn't speak Hebrew.

== Career ==
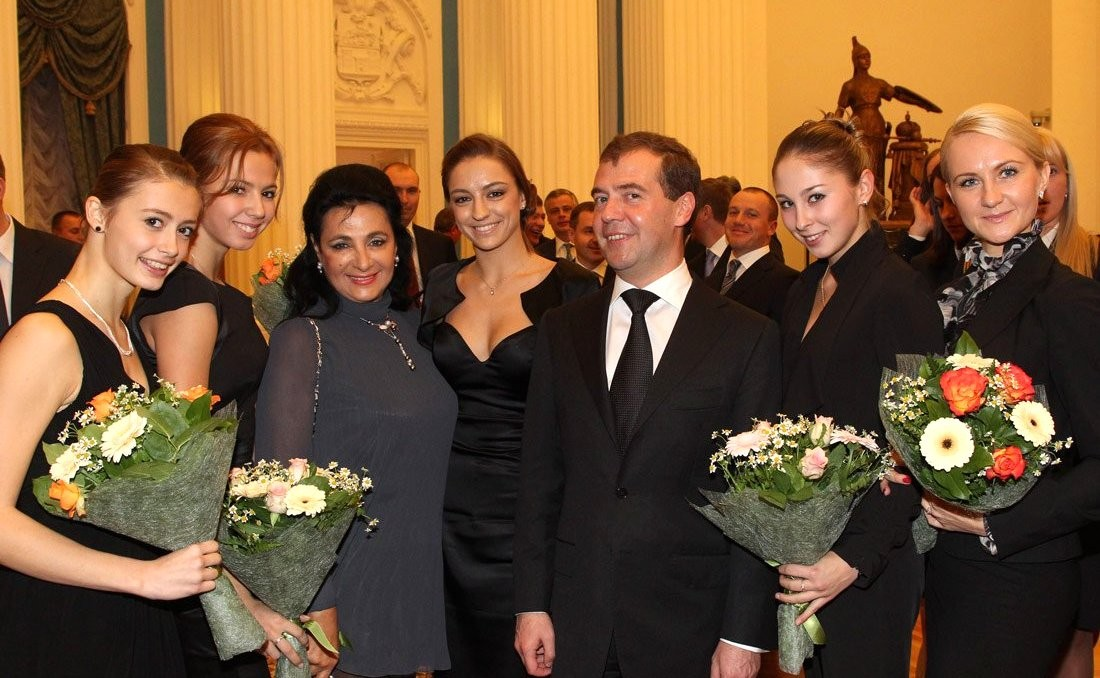
(L-R) Viner with rhythmic gymnasts Yana Lukonina, Daria Dmitrieva, Evgenia Kanaeva, former President Dmitri Medvedev, Daria Kondakova and RG coach Anna Shumilova

As a young girl Viner wanted to take ballet but was discouraged, so she took up gymnastics at the age of 11. Viner was a three-time champion of the Uzbek SSR and graduated from the Uzbek State Institute of Physical Culture. She worked as coach of the national team in rhythmic gymnastics in Tashkent, and under her tutelage, Venera Zaripova became her first successful gymnast. In 1990, Viner briefly moved to Great Britain to coach the British national team.

After Barcelona Irina moved to Moscow and began working for the Moscow City Sports Association (MCSA). Since 1992 Irina Viner-Usmanova was the head coach of the Olympic Training Center. She became the head coach of the Russian National Team in 2001 and the president of the Russian Rhythmic Gymnastics Federation in 2008.

In 2015, Viner was awarded the Olympic Order in recognition of her outstanding achievements in global sports, making Viner the first gymnastics coach to receive the award. Thomas Bach, the president of the International Olympic Committee personally handed the necklace to her and presented the award.

On 6 February 2016, Viner was elected to the Supreme Council of the United Russia party.

Viner featured in the 2017 documentary Over the Limit, which covered her training of Margarita Mamun in the run-up to the 2016 Olympics. The film depicts her controversial training methods including sustained verbal abuse, with statements and insults directed at Mamun such as "You're going to die bitch" and "Go f*** yourself with your shaking".

In an interview she gave to Russia's Hello! magazine at her home, she has said that her pupils venerate myrrh-pouring icons before every competition. Since she has talked about reading Kabbalah in the same interview, some gymnastics sites translating the article into English assumed she was referring to Kabbalah icons, but this is most likely a mistaken assumption, as myrrh-pouring icons have long been associated with Eastern Orthodox Christianity, while Kabbalah is a form of Jewish mysticism, and Judaism forbids the use of icons altogether.

After Israeli gymnast Linoy Ashram defeated Russia's Dina Averina at the 2020 Summer Olympics in Tokyo in the all-around individual competition, Viner attacked Ashram, the judges, as well as the wider gymnastics community, accusing them of bias against Russia and saying that "Dina is the real champion". In the following all-around group competition at the same Olympics, the Russian team lost to the Bulgarian team, and Viner in response once more insinuated an anti-Russian conspiracy in the judging, saying, "everyone understood perfectly well that this was meant to happen, that Russia’s hegemony had to be stopped." Three months later, it was announced that Viner had signed the coach of the Israeli rhythmic gymnastics team at Tokyo, Ira Vigdorchik, to become the new coach of Russia's rhythmic gymnastic team.

In February 2023, Viner proposed establishing an alternative Olympics Games and invite BRICS and Shanghai Cooperation Organisation countries to participate in it, following the news that Western nations oppose Russia's involvement in the 2024 Summer Olympics due to its invasion of Ukraine.

Viner was sanctioned by the International Gymnastics Federation (FIG) on 6 March 2023 for her behavior and statements at the 2020 Summer Olympics. The disciplinary commission ruled that Viner would be prohibited from attending international competitions for the next two years. On 22 November, the GEF Appeal Tribunal Panel upheld Viner's two-year sanction, clarified its scope and timing, and declared the Artistic Gymnastics Federation of Russia liable for the actions of the Russian Rhythmic Gymnastics Federation and its members.

Viner resigned as the president of the Russian Rhythmic Gymnastics Federation in October 2024.

In February 2025, Viner announced her resignation from position of head coach of Russian National team in rhythmic gymnastics.

== Personal life ==
Viner was married to Uzbek–Russian tycoon Alisher Usmanov until 2022. She and Usmanov originally met in their youth at a sports hall in Tashkent, where he was involved in fencing; they reconnected many years later in Moscow. She has a son from her first marriage, Anton, who was born in 1973 and later adopted by Usmanov. Anton is a real estate investor.

On 9 May 2022, during the Russian invasion of Ukraine, Viner was sanctioned by Latvia, included in the country's list of undesirable persons, and was prohibited from entering the country. On 19 October, she was sanctioned by Ukraine as a member of the Supreme Council of the United Russia party.

== Notable pupils ==
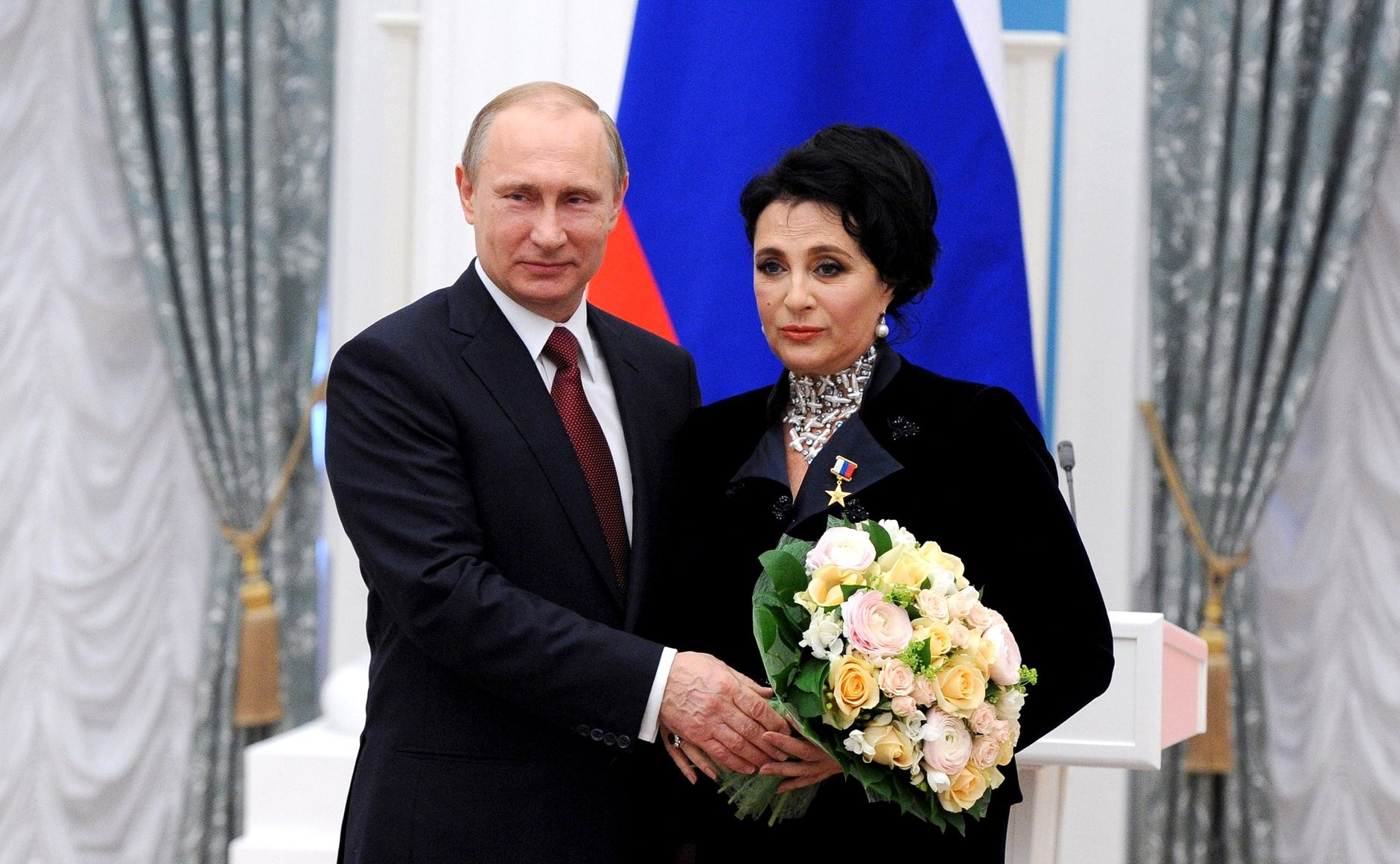
Viner with President Vladimir Putin in May 2015

Viner has trained many Russian Olympic/World/European/World Cup medal winners, including:

=== Russian gymnasts ===
Individual rhythmic gymnasts:

- Evgenia Kanaeva (born in 1990) (2 gold at the 2012 Olympics and 2008 Olympics, 17 gold in World, 13 gold in European, 4 gold in World games, multiple World Cup medals)
- Alina Kabaeva (b. 1983) (1 gold in 2004 Olympics and a bronze in 2000 Olympics, 9 gold in World, 15 gold in European, 5 gold in World Cup)
- Margarita Mamun (b. 1995) (1 gold in 2016 Olympics, 7 gold in World, 4 gold in European, 4 gold in World Cup Final)
- Yulia Barsukova (b. 1978) (1 gold in 2000 Olympics, 1 gold in World, 3 gold in European, 1 Gold in World Cup)
- Dina Averina (b. 1998) (1 silver in 2020 Olympics, 18 gold in Worlds, 10 gold in Europeans).
- Yana Kudryavtseva (b. 1997) (1 silver in 2016 Olympics, 13 gold in World, 8 gold in European, 5 gold in World Cup Final, 4 Gold in European Games)
- Irina Tchachina (b. 1982) (1 silver in 2004 Olympics, 3 gold in World, 6 gold in European, 4 gold in World games, 2 Gold in World Cup)
- Daria Dmitrieva (b. 1993) (1 silver in 2012 Olympics, 4 gold in World, 1 gold in European, 1 gold in Universiade)
- Yanina Batyrshina (b. 1979) (1 silver in 1996 Olympics, 5 gold in World, 5 gold in European)
- Daria Kondakova (b. 1991) (4 gold in World, 3 gold in European)
- Olga Kapranova (b. 1987) (10 gold in World, 5 gold in European, 2 gold in World Games)
- Vera Sessina (b. 1986) (6 gold in World, 6 gold in European, 1 gold in World Games, 4 gold in World Cup)
- Arina Averina (b. 1998) (5 gold in Worlds, 9 gold in Europeans).
- Amina Zaripova (b. 1976) (5 gold in World, 3 gold in Europeans)
- Aleksandra Soldatova (b. 1998) (4 gold in World, 3 gold in Europeans)
- Natalia Lipkovskaya (b. 1979) (3 gold in World, 1 gold in Europeans).
- Lyasan Utiasheva (b. 1985) (2 gold in Europeans).
- Zarina Gizikova (b. 1985) (2 gold in Europeans).
- Alexandra Merkulova (b. 1995) (1 gold in 2010 Youth Olympic Games).
- Olga Belova (b. 1983) (1 gold in World and European team).
- Julia Rosliakova (b. 1975) multiple World and European team medalist.
- Vera Shatalina (b. 1966) - former Soviet rhythmic gymnast and Honored Master of Sports coach of Russia in rhythmic gymnastics.
- Venera Zaripova (b. 1966) - pioneered student, multiple Soviet champion and competed at the world championships.

Notable group rhythmic gymnasts:

- Yelena Posevina (b. 1986) (2 gold in group at the 2004 Summer Olympics and 2008 Summer Olympics, 2 golds in Worlds Group all-around and 2 golds in European Group all around).
- Natalia Lavrova (b. 1984) (2 gold in group at the 2000 Summer Olympics and 2004 Summer Olympics, 2 golds in Worlds Group all-around and 2 golds in European Group all around).
- Anastasia Bliznyuk (b. 1994) (2 gold in group at the 2012 Summer Olympics and 2016 Summer Olympics, 1 silver in group at the 2020 Summer Olympics, 1 gold in Worlds, 3 gold in European Championships group all-around).
- Anna Gavrilenko (b. 1990) (1 gold at the 2008 Summer Olympics, 2007 World Group all-around gold and 2 golds in European Group all around).
- Anastasia Maksimova (b.1991) (1 gold at the 2016 Summer Olympics, 2015 World Group all-around gold, 2 Gold in Europeans Games and 1 gold in European Championships group all-around).
- Diana Borisova (b.1997) (2015 World Group all-around gold, 2 Gold in Europeans Games and 1 gold in European Championships group all-around).
- Sofya Skomorokh (b.1999) (2015 World Group all-around gold, 2 Gold in Europeans Games and 1 gold in European Championships group all-around).

Counselor/Coordinator for Russian Group:

- 2020 Summer Olympics Group silver medalists (Anastasia Bliznyuk, Anastasia Maksimova, Angelina Shkatova, Anastasia Tatareva, Alisa Tishchenko)
- 2016 Summer Olympics Group gold medalists (Maria Tolkacheva, Anastasiia Tatareva, Anastasia Maksimova, Anastasia Bliznyuk, Vera Biryukova)
- 2012 Summer Olympics Group gold medalists: (Ksenia Dudkina, Uliana Donskova, Anastasia Bliznyuk, Alina Makarenko, Anastasia Nazarenko, Karolina Sevastyanova)
- 2008 Summer Olympics Group gold medalists (Margarita Aliychuk, Anna Gavrilenko, Tatiana Gorbunova, Elena Posevina, Daria Shkurikhina, Natalia Zueva)
- 2004 Summer Olympics Group gold medalists(Olesya Belugina, Olga Glatskikh, Tatiana Kurbakova, Natalia Lavrova, Yelena Posevina, Elena Murzina)
- 2000 Summer Olympics Group gold medalists (Irina Belova, Yelena Chalamova, Natalia Lavrova, Mariya Netesova, Vyera Shimanskaya, Irina Zilber)
- 1996 Summer Olympics Group bronze medalists (Yevgeniya Bochkaryova, Irina Dzyuba, Yuliya Ivanova, Yelena Krivoshey, Olga Shtyrenko, Angelina Yushkova)

== Awards ==
- In the 2020 edition of the national sports award Pride of Russia, in the nomination Coach of the Year
- "Living Legend" prize by the Federation of Jewish Communities of Russia in 2007.

== See also ==
- Irina Viner-Usmanova Gymnastics Palace
- List of Jews in sports (non-players)
