= 2021 Rhythmic Gymnastics World Championships =

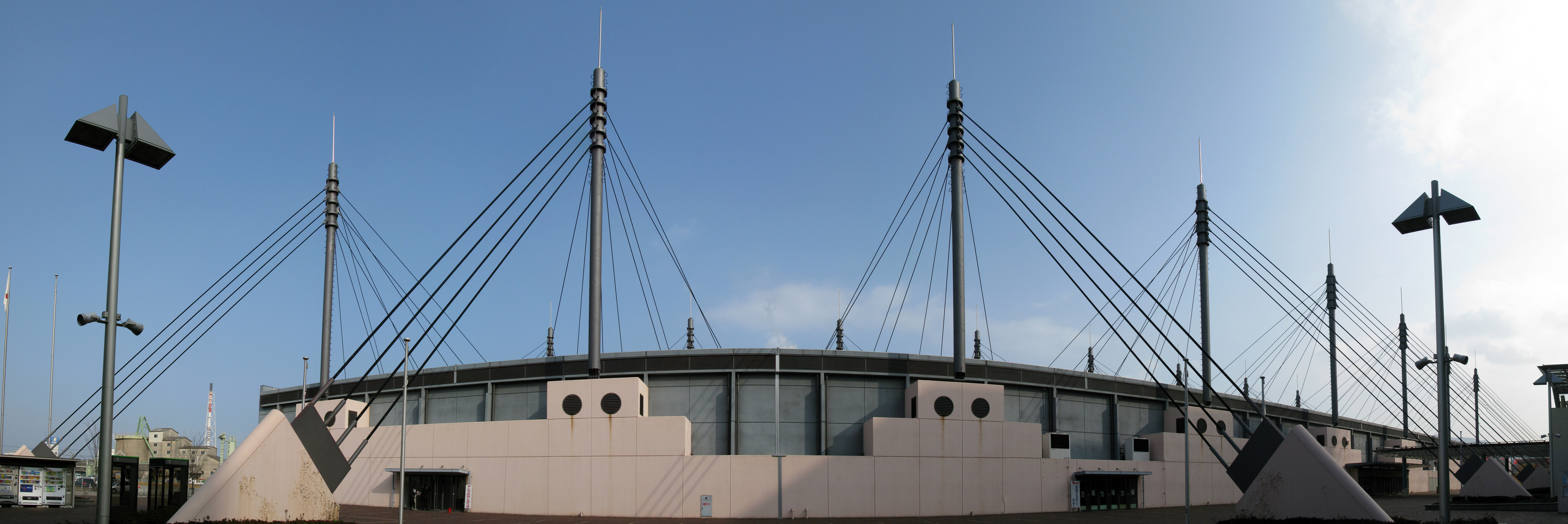
- Venue: West Japan General Exhibition Center
- Location: Kitakyushu, Japan
- Dates: 27–31 October 2021
- Competitors: 168 from 47 nations

The 2021 Rhythmic Gymnastics World Championships were held from 27 to 31 October 2021 in Kitakyushu, Japan.

Unusually, Japan hosted the event in conjunction with the 2021 World Artistic Gymnastics Championships after the original host of the artistic gymnastics championships, Denmark, withdrew from hosting it. International Gymnastics Federation (FIG) president Morinari Watanabe commented that he hoped the combined events would promote urban regeneration in the host cities.

Defending World champion Dina Averina broke the record for the most medals won at the Rhythmic Gymnastics World Championships with 22 total medals and also became the first gymnast to win four World all-around titles. Alina Harnasko won the gold medal in the ribbon, becoming the first non-Russian individual World champion since 2013 and the first Belarusian individual World champion since 1996. The Russian group won their fifth consecutive World all-around title.

== Overview ==
=== Background ===
Due to the ongoing COVID-19 pandemic, the event was held in a bubble to isolate athletes and staff from the public. The prevention measures were deemed generally effective, as only three infections were reported among athletes and officials during the events, and none among spectators. A documentary was produced on the event's organization and infection prevention measures.

This was the third Rhythmic World Championships held in Japan. 47 countries sent competitors. A new quota system was implemented that capped individual entries at 105; quota places were won at continental championships. 69 individuals and 99 gymnasts from 18 groups ultimately competed.

The Russian gymnasts experienced delays in the issuing of their visas, but they received them on time to participate. Due to a World Anti-Doping Agency ruling that prevented Russian athletes from competing under their national flag and anthem, they competed as the "Russian Gymnastics Federation". A song by Pyotr Tchaikovsky was played instead instead of the Russian anthem.

The Bulgarian group, the Olympic champions, withdrew shortly before the event after one of their gymnasts, Laura Traets, was severely injured in a training session.

=== Event results ===
The Championships were held shortly after the delayed 2020 Summer Olympics, where dominant gymnast Dina Averina had unexpectedly lost the title to Linoy Ashram. Ashram did not compete in the World Championships. Averina had previously won three consecutive World titles. She won the all-around title as well as gold in the team event with her teammates. Olympic bronze medalist Alina Harnasko won silver in the all-around. Averina's twin sister, Arina Averina was in 11th place in the all-around after three routines but rose to win the bronze medal after her last. It was her third all-around World medal.

In the individual finals, Dina Averina also won the hoop and ball (despite a time penalty) titles. Although both Arina Averina and Harnasko had posted higher clubs scores in the qualifications, both made mistakes in the final; Dina Averina won the clubs title as well, bringing her to a career total of 18 gold medals at the World Championships and 22 total of any kind, a new record. In the ribbon final, however, she made an error on a throw, and Harnasko won that final to become the only other gymnast to win an individual title at the event. Harnasko also won silver in hoop and bronze with ball, her first individual World medals.

Anastasiia Salos won her first individual World medal, bronze, in the clubs final, and competing at her first World Championships, Sofia Raffaeli won bronze in the hoop final.

In the group event, the dominant Russian group had a drop at the beginning of the first routine of the all-around and finished that routine in 3rd place. However, after their second routine, they rose to win the event over the Italian group, their fifth consecutive title. The Belarusian group won bronze, their first World all-around medal since 2014. In the routine finals, the Russian group won the 5 balls final ahead of Italy, while the Italian group won the 3 hoops + 2 pairs of clubs final ahead of Russia. The Japanese group, which was fourth in the all-around, won bronze in both finals.

For the first time at the World Championships, the team event scores combined the individual scores from the all-around qualification along with the group scores from the group all-around final. Russia won the team event, followed by Italy and Belarus.

Sumire Kita was awarded the Tokio Inkarami Prize for Style.

== Participating countries ==
Participants	Nations
Group + 3 individuals	Azerbaijan Italy Japan Spain Ukraine United States
Group + 2 individuals	Belarus Brazil China Hungary Kazakhstan RGF (Note: Under the Court of Arbitration for Sport ban, Russia may not use its name, flag, or anthem and must present themselves as "Neutral Athlete" or "Neutral Team" at any world championships until December 16, 2022. Thus, Russian gymnasts competed under a modified flag of the Russian Rhythmic Gymnastics Federation and the name "RGF" at the 2021 World Championships.)
Group + 1 individual	Estonia Finland France Germany Great Britain India
3 individuals	Mexico
2 individuals	Bulgaria Georgia Romania South Korea Uzbekistan
1 individual	Angola Armenia Australia Austria Bolivia Canada Chile Colombia Croatia Cyprus Czech Republic Ghana; Greece Guatemala Kyrgyzstan Latvia Lithuania Norway Poland Portugal South Africa Slovenia San Marino Turkey

== Schedule ==
- Wednesday, October 27
  - 10:00 - 17:40 Individual Qualification - Hoop and Ball
  - 19:15 - 19:50 Individual Hoop Final
  - 20:00 - 20:40 Individual Ball Final
- Thursday, October 28
  - 10:00 - 17:45 Individual Qualification - Clubs and Ribbon
  - 19:15 - 19:50 Individual Clubs Final
  - 20:00 - 20:40 Individual Ribbon Final
- Friday, October 29
  - 16:50 - 20:00 Group All Around
- Saturday, October 30
  - 14:30 - 16:40 Individual All Around (group B)
  - 17:00 - 19:10 Individual All Around (group A)
- Sunday, October 31
  - 17:30 - 18:15 Group 5 Balls Final
  - 18:20 - 19:10 Group 3 Hoops and 2 Pairs of Clubs Final
  - 20:20 - 20:40 Closing Ceremony

== Medal summary ==
Event	Gold	Silver	Bronze
Team Competition
Team All-Around	RGF; Individuals; Arina Averina; Dina Averina; Group; Anastasia Bliznyuk; Polina Orlova; Angelina Shkatova; Alisa Tishchenko; Maria Tolkacheva	Italy; Individuals; Alexandra Agiurgiuculese; Milena Baldassarri; Sofia Raffaeli; Group; Martina Centofanti; Agnese Duranti; Alessia Maurelli; Daniela Mogurean; Martina Santandrea	Belarus; Individuals; Alina Harnasko; Anastasiia Salos; Group; Hanna Haidukevich; Anastasiya Malakanava; Anastasiya Rybakova; Arina Tsitsilina; Karyna Yarmolenka
Individual Finals
All-Around	Dina Averina	(Belarus) Alina Harnasko	Arina Averina
Hoop	Dina Averina	(Belarus) Alina Harnasko	(Italy) Sofia Raffaeli
Ball	Dina Averina	Arina Averina	(Belarus) Alina Harnasko
Clubs	Dina Averina	Arina Averina	(Belarus) Anastasiia Salos
Ribbon	(Belarus) Alina Harnasko	Dina Averina	Arina Averina
Groups Finals
Group All-Around	RGF; Anastasia Bliznyuk; Polina Orlova; Angelina Shkatova; Alisa Tishchenko; Maria Tolkacheva	Italy; Martina Centofanti; Agnese Duranti; Alessia Maurelli; Daniela Mogurean; Martina Santandrea	Belarus; Hanna Haidukevich; Anastasiya Malakanava; Anastasiya Rybakova; Arina Tsitsilina; Karyna Yarmolenka
5 Balls	RGF; Anastasia Bliznyuk; Polina Orlova; Angelina Shkatova; Alisa Tishchenko; Maria Tolkacheva	Italy; Martina Centofanti; Agnese Duranti; Alessia Maurelli; Daniela Mogurean; Martina Santandrea	Japan; Rina Imaoka; Rinako Inaki; Rie Matsubara; Sayuri Sugimoto; Ayuka Suzuki
3 Hoops 4 Clubs	Italy; Martina Centofanti; Agnese Duranti; Alessia Maurelli; Daniela Mogurean; Martina Santandrea	RGF; Anastasia Bliznyuk; Polina Orlova; Angelina Shkatova; Alisa Tishchenko; Maria Tolkacheva	Japan; Rina Imaoka; Rinako Inaki; Rie Matsubara; Sayuri Sugimoto; Ayuka Suzuki

== Individual ==
=== Individual Qualification ===
- The top 8 scores in individual apparatus qualify to the apparatus finals and the top 18 in overall qualification scores advance to the all-around final.
- Only the 3 best results are counted in the total score
- Only the 2 highest ranking players from each country can qualify to each one of the finals.

Rank	Gymnast	Nation	Hoop (rhythmic gymnastics)	Ball (rhythmic gymnastics)	Clubs (rhythmic gymnastics)	Ribbon (rhythmic gymnastics)	Total
1	Dina Averina	RGF	27.850 (1)	28.875 (1)	28.450 (1)	23.800 (1)	85.175 (Q)
2	Arina Averina	RGF	27.150 (3)	28.550 (2)	27.950 (2)	23.600 (2)	83.650 (Q)
3	Alina Harnasko	Belarus	27.250 (2)	27.225 (3)	27.200 (3)	23.500 (3)	81.675 (Q)
4	Boryana Kaleyn	Bulgaria	25.200 (4)	26.550 (4)	27.150 (4)	23.100 (4)	78.900 (Q)
5	Milena Baldassarri	Italy	25.100 (5)	25.850 (6)	25.800 (7)		76.750 (Q)
6	Viktoriia Onopriienko	Ukraine	24.050 (8)	26.200 (5)	26.150 (6)	20.700 (12)	76.400 (Q)
7	Khrystyna Pohranychna	Ukraine	24.450 (7)	25.100 (9)	25.550 (8)	21.750 (6)	75.100 (Q)
8	Sumire Kita	Japan	23.950 (9)	25.650 (7)	24.400 (10)	21.475 (9)	74.000 (Q)
9	Tatyana Volozhanina	Bulgaria	23.550 (13)	25.450 (8)	23.700 (11)	21.650 (7)	72.700 (Q)
10	Anastasiia Salos	Belarus	14.000 (62)	23.750 (14)	26.550 (5)	21.000 (11)	71.300 (Q)
11	Jelizaveta Polstjanaja	Latvia	23.950 (10)	22.800 (18)	23.450 (12)	16.500 (40)	70.200 (Q)
12	Sofia Raffaeli	Italy	24.650 (6)		25.100 (9)	20.400 (16)	70.150 (Q)
13	Barbara Domingos	Brazil	23.550 (12)	23.750 (13)	22.500 (17)	20.500 (14)	69.800 (Q)
14	Fanni Pigniczki	Hungary	23.600 (11)	24.450 (11)	21.500 (28)	21.050 (10)	69.550 (Q)
15	Andreea Verdes	Romania	22.900 (15)	22.400 (24)	23.450 (13)	19.450 (24)	68.750 (Q)
16	Margarita Kolosov	Germany	22.025 (19)	23.875 (12)	22.550 (15)	20.200 (18)	68.450 (Q)
17	Ekaterina Vedeneeva	Slovenia	22.750 (16)	22.850 (17)	22.800 (14)	22.150 (5)	68.400 (Q)
18	Chisaki Oiwa	Japan	20.750 (28)	24.450 (10)	22.150 (20)		67.350 (Q)
19	Zhao Yue	China	23.100 (14)	22.450 (23)	21.800 (25)	19.550 (22)	67.350
20	Maelle Millet	France	22.700 (17)	22.050 (29)	22.550 (16)	20.050 (20)	67.300
21	Elzhana Taniyeva	Kazakhstan	21.650 (21)	23.450 (15)	21.450 (29)	18.300 (31)	66.550
22	Annaliese Dragan	Romania	22.350 (18)	21.750 (31)	22.450 (18)	18.600 (28)	66.550
23	Arzu Jalilova	Azerbaijan	21.350 (23)	22.600 (21)	21.700 (27)		65.650
24	Zohra Aghamirova	Azerbaijan	21.400 (22)	21.150 (35)	22.050 (21)	19.950 (21)	60.050
25	Polina Berezina	Spain	20.450 (31)	21.400 (32)	21.900 (24)	19.450 (23)	63.750
26	Malgorzata Roszatycka	Poland	21.200 (24)	20.850 (36)	21.350 (30)	16.550 (39)	63.400
27	Kamelya Tuncel	Turkey	20.900 (25)	20.500 (38)	21.900 (23)	20.200 (19)	63.300
28	Wang Zilu	China	19.700 (35)	21.150 (34)	22.400 (19)	18.250 (32)	63.250
29	Takhmina Ikromova	Uzbekistan	20.750 (27)	20.650 (37)	21.800 (26)	20.250 (17)	63.200
30	Evita Griskenas	United States	19.950 (33)	22.500 (22)	19.950 (36)	20.550 (13)	63.000
31	Dilnaz Bailenova	Kazakhstan	18.950 (45)	22.700 (19)	20.950 (31)	19.000 (27)	62.650
32	Viktoria Bogdanova	Estonia	15.650 (59)	22.350 (25)	20.850 (32)	18.550 (30)	61.750
33	Maria Dervisi	Greece	20.000 (32)	22.650 (20)	18.450 (46)	19.100 (26)	61.750
34	Ketevan Arbolishvili	Georgia	19.850 (34)	22.050 (28)	19.750 (39)	19.100 (25)	61.650
35	Ana Luisa Passos	Brazil	20.900 (26)	22.150 (27)	17.850 (51)	17.200 (38)	60.900
36	Alexandra Kiroi-Bogatyreva	Australia	20.750 (29)	20.000 (42)	19.050 (42)	17.550 (33)	59.800
37	Josephine Juul Møller	Norway	18.925 (46)	20.450 (39)	20.250 (33)	17.375 (37)	59.625
38	Teresa Gorospe	Spain	18.400 (49)	18.650 (50)	22.000 (22)	17.450 (36)	59.050
39	Fausta Sostakaite	Lithuania	19.050 (43)	19.500 (46)	20.200 (34)	16.025 (46)	58.750
40	Rita Araujo	Portugal	19.575 (37)	19.750 (44)	19.000 (43)	16.200 (44)	58.325
41	Elisabeth Jamil	Finland	19.000 (44)	19.200 (47)	20.000 (35)	15.850 (48)	58.200
42	Katherine Uchida	Canada	20.550 (30)	19.750 (43)	16.750 (58)	17.450 (34)	57.750
43	Kim Joowon	South Korea	19.250 (41)	20.100 (41)	17.900 (49)	16.150 (45)	57.250
44	Marfa Ekimova	Great Britain	19.350 (39)	17.800 (53)	19.875 (38)	11.600 (59)	57.025
45	Lina Dussan	Colombia	18.800 (47)	19.150 (48)	18.950 (44)	16.400 (42)	56.900
46	Silva Sargsyan	Armenia	19.300 (40)	16.650 (5)	19.900 (37)	17.450 (35)	56.650
47	Seo Goeun	South Korea	16.800 (56)	21.250 (33)	18.200 (47)	15.300 (50)	56.250
48	Aisha Izabekova	Kyrgyzstan	18.650 (48)	18.450 (51)	18.800 (45)	14.200 (54)	55.900
49	Karla Diaz	Mexico	19.600 (36)	17.650 (54)	17.850 (50)	15.000 (53)	55.100
50	Gaia Garoffolo	Czech Republic	18.200 (50)	20.150 (40)	16.400 (59)	15.850 (47)	54.750
51	Javiera Rubilar	Chile	16.500 (57)	19.650 (45)	17.450 (52)	15.150 (51)	53.600
52	Ana Bejiashvili	Georgia	17.225 (53)	17.850 (52)	17.300 (54)	16.300 (43)	52.375
53	Valentina Domenig-Ozimic	Austria	18.100 (51)	16.150 (59)	17.900 (48)	10.500 (61)	52.150
54	Anna Sokolova	Cyprus	16.000 (58)	18.950 (49)	17.050 (55)	15.350 (49)	52.000
55	Antonella Genuzio	Bolivia	17.200 (54)	17.000 (55)	17.400 (53)	5.100 (63)	51.600
56	Lana Sambol	Croatia	19.200 (42)	15.350 (61)	17.000 (56)	11.750 (58)	51.550
57	Lucia Castiglioni	San Marino	17.250 (52)	16.550 (58)	16.900 (57)	15.050 (52)	50.700
58	Shannon Gardiner	South Africa	16.850 (55)	16.800 (56)	16.100 (60)	14.000 (55)	49.750
59	Leslie Porras Osorio	Guatemala	15.400 (60)	15.450 (60)	13.900 (61)	10.950 (60)	44.750
60	Luana Gomes	Angola	14.575 (61)	14.800 (62)	13.900 (62)	13.325 (57)	43.275
61	Bavleen Kaur	India	10.750 (63)	11.000 (63)	13.750 (63)	9.800 (62)	35.500
–	Alexandra Agiurgiuculese	Italy		23.150 (16)		21.525 (8)	
–	Erica Foster	United States		22.200 (26)	19.200 (41)		
–	Marina Malpica	Mexico		22.050 (30)	19.300 (40)		
–	Lili Mizuno	United States	21.750 (20)			18.600 (29)	
–	Kaho Minagawa	Japan				20.400 (15)	
–	Ledia Juárez	Mexico	19.550 (38)			13.850 (56)	
–	Narmin Bayramova	Azerbaijan				16.475 (41)	

=== All-around ===
Rank	Gymnast	Nation	Hoop (rhythmic gymnastics)	Ball (rhythmic gymnastics)	Clubs (rhythmic gymnastics)	Ribbon (rhythmic gymnastics)	Total
1st place, gold medalist(s)	Dina Averina	RGF	28.000	28.250	28.700	23.450	108.400
2nd place, silver medalist(s)	Alina Harnasko	Belarus	27.150	27.900	27.400	22.850	105.300
3rd place, bronze medalist(s)	Arina Averina	RGF	24.150	28.050	27.450	23.550	103.200
4	Boryana Kaleyn	Bulgaria	26.400	27.700	25.850	22.500	102.450
5	Viktoriia Onopriienko	Ukraine	25.250	25.200	26.400	22.800	99.650
6	Sofia Raffaeli	Italy	25.550	25.950	25.900	22.125	99.525
7	Tatyana Volozhanina	Bulgaria	24.700	24.600	25.200	22.100	96.600
8	Sumire Kita	Japan	25.100	25.450	24.300	21.600	96.450
9	Milena Baldassarri	Italy	24.450	25.800	26.050	19.800	96.100
10	Anastasiia Salos	Belarus	20.250	26.400	26.500	22.300	95.450
11	Khrystyna Pohranychna	Ukraine	23.350	24.225	25.100	22.350	95.025
12	Ekaterina Vedeneeva	Slovenia	23.150	24.000	23.900	22.450	93.500
13	Chisaki Oiwa	Japan	23.950	24.300	23.350	21.800	93.400
14	Fanni Pigniczki	Hungary	23.400	24.200	21.900	20.950	90.450
15	Jelizaveta Polstjanaja	Latvia	23.950	23.350	21.950	19.200	88.450
16	Margarita Kolosov	Germany	21.800	23.000	22.800	20.450	88.050
17	Barbara Domingos	Brazil	22.750	23.000	22.700	19.300	87.750
18	Andreea Verdes	Romania	21.500	20.950	22.450	20.250	85.150

=== Hoop ===
Rank	Gymnast	Nation	D Score	E Score	Pen.	Total
1st place, gold medalist(s)	Dina Averina	RGF	18.800	9.000	-0.05	27.750
2nd place, silver medalist(s)	Alina Harnasko	Belarus	17.200	8.750		25.950
3rd place, bronze medalist(s)	Sofia Raffaeli	Italy	17.500	8.350		25.850
4	Boryana Kaleyn	Bulgaria	17.200	8.500		25.700
5	Milena Baldassarri	Italy	17.000	8.450		25.450
6	Arina Averina	RGF	16.800	8.150		24.950
7	Khrystyna Pohranychna	Ukraine	16.600	8.200		24.800
8	Viktoriia Onopriienko	Ukraine	16.000	8.350		24.350

=== Ball ===
Rank	Gymnast	Nation	D Score	E Score	Pen.	Total
1st place, gold medalist(s)	Dina Averina	RGF	20.100	9.025		29.125
2nd place, silver medalist(s)	Arina Averina	RGF	18.700	8.975		27.675
3rd place, bronze medalist(s)	Alina Harnasko	Belarus	18.300	9.000		27.300
4	Boryana Kaleyn	Bulgaria	18.100	8.300	-0.05	26.350
5	Sumire Kita	Japan	17.800	8.250		26.050
6	Milena Baldassarri	Italy	17.700	8.150		25.850
7	Tatyana Volozhanina	Bulgaria	17.400	8.100	-0.15	25.350
8	Viktoriia Onopriienko	Ukraine	14.400	5.600	-0.90	19.100

=== Clubs ===
Rank	Gymnast	Nation	D Score	E Score	Pen.	Total
1st place, gold medalist(s)	Dina Averina	RGF	18.200	8.900		27.100
2nd place, silver medalist(s)	Arina Averina	RGF	18.100	8.650		26.750
3rd place, bronze medalist(s)	Anastasiia Salos	Belarus	17.800	8.600		26.400
4	Boryana Kaleyn	Bulgaria	18.300	7.900		26.200
5	Alina Harnasko	Belarus	17.600	8.500		26.100
6	Milena Baldassarri	Italy	17.300	8.700		26.000
7	Viktoriia Onopriienko	Ukraine	17.500	8.050		25.550
8	Khrystyna Pohranychna	Ukraine	17.300	7.575	-0.30	24.575

=== Ribbon ===
Rank	Gymnast	Nation	D Score	E Score	Pen.	Total
1st place, gold medalist(s)	Alina Harnasko	Belarus	15.000	8.950		23.950
2nd place, silver medalist(s)	Dina Averina	RGF	14.700	9.200		23.900
3rd place, bronze medalist(s)	Arina Averina	RGF	14.400	9.050		23.450
4	Khrystyna Pohranychna	Ukraine	13.600	8.350		21.950
5	Tatyana Volozhanina	Bulgaria	13.800	8.100		21.900
6	Alexandra Agiurgiuculese	Italy	14.000	7.500		21.500
7	Ekaterina Vedeneeva	Slovenia	13.300	8.150		21.450
8	Boryana Kaleyn	Bulgaria	13.600	7.400		21.000

== Group ==
=== Squads ===
Team	Azerbaijan (AZE)	Belarus (BLR)	Brazil (BRA)	China (CHN)	Spain (ESP)	Estonia (EST)
Members	Gullu Aghalarzade; Laman Alimuradova; Zeynab Hummatova; Yelyzaveta Luzan; Darya Sorokina	Hanna Haidukevich; Anastasiya Malakanava; Anastasiya Rybakova; Arina Tsitsilina; Karyna Yarmolenka	Maria Arakaki; Vitoria Guerra (Note: Only competed in 5 Balls); Deborah Medrado (Note: Only competed in 3 Hoops + 4 Clubs); Nicole Pircio; Beatriz Silva; Barbara Urquiza	Guo Qiqi; Hao Ting; Huang Zhangjiayang; Liu Xin; Xu Yanshu	Ines Bergua; Ana Gayán; Valeria Márquez; Mireia Martínez; Uma Mendez; Patricia Pérez	Laurabell Kabrits; Evelin Naptal; Arina Okamanchuk; Carmely Reiska; Alina Vesselova
Team	Finland (FIN)	France (FRA)	Great Britain (GBR)	Germany (GER)	Hungary (HUN)	India (IND)
Members	Assi Johansson; Elisa Liinavuori; Milja Naerevaara; Emma Rantala; Viliina Sipilae; Amanda Virkkunen	Emma Delaine; Manelle Inaho; Celia Joseph-Noel; Ashley Julien; Eloise Marchon; Lozea Vilarino	Emily Austin; Alida Bogdanova; Rosina Cheale; Atanaska Kirilova; Isabella Mason-Iran; Phillipa Museva	Viktoria Burjak; Nathalia Koehn; Daniella Kromm; Alina Oganesyan; Noemi Peschel	Julia Farkas; Anita Fekete; Nadin Fodor; Mandula Virag Meszaros; Reka Somhegyi; Monika Urban-Szabo	Vaibhavi Bapat; Nirja Chavan; Aditee Dandekar; Angelica Fernandes; Disha Nidre; Janhavi Vartak
Team	Italy (ITA)	Japan (JPN)	Kazakhstan (KAZ)	RGF	Ukraine (UKR)	United States (USA)
Members	Martina Centofanti; Agnese Duranti; Alessia Maurelli; Daniela Mogurean; Martina Santandrea	Rina Imaoka; Rinako Inaki; Rie Matsubara; Sayuri Sugimoto; Ayuka Suzuki	Milana Budnik; Alina Chernyshova; Sagina Muratkyzy; Aislu Murzagaliyeva; Aidana Shayakhmetova; Dayana Shayakhmetova	Anastasia Bliznyuk; Polina Orlova; Angelina Shkatova; Alisa Tishchenko; Maria Tolkacheva	Diana Baieva; Diana Dovganiuk; Daryna Duda; Alina Melnyk; Mariia Vysochanska	Camilla Feeley; Isabella Ivanova; Nicole Khoma; Gergana Petkova; Karolina Saverino; Emily Wilson

=== All-Around ===
The top 8 scores in the apparatus qualifies to the group apparatus finals.

Place	Nation	5	3 + 2	Total
1st place, gold medalist(s)	RGF	46.250 (1)	42.100 (1)	88.350
2nd place, silver medalist(s)	Italy	44.350 (4)	41.650 (2)	86.000
3rd place, bronze medalist(s)	Belarus	44.900 (3)	40.500 (3)	85.400
4	Japan	45.000 (2)	39.900 (5)	84.900
5	China	42.250 (5)	39.950 (4)	82.200
6	Azerbaijan	39.600 (6)	38.000 (8)	77.600
7	Germany	38.050 (9)	37.700 (9)	75.750
8	Ukraine	37.350 (11)	38.350 (7)	75.700
9	Brazil	39.450 (7)	36.000 (11)	75.450
10	United States	37.500 (10)	36.600 (10)	74.100
11	France	38.600 (8)	35.400 (12)	74.000
12	Spain	34.800 (12)	39.150 (6)	73.950
13	Estonia	34.450 (13)	34.550 (13)	69.000
14	Hungary	33.150 (14)	33.250 (15)	66.400
15	Finland	29.800 (15)	34.150 (14)	63.950
16	Kazakhstan	28.500 (16)	29.950 (16)	58.450
17	Great Britain	27.200 (17)	27.100 (17)	54.300
18	India	16.650 (18)	13.450 (18)	30.100

=== 5 Balls ===
Rank	Nation	E Score	D Score	Pen.	Total
1st place, gold medalist(s)	RGF	8.600	37.400		46.000
2nd place, silver medalist(s)	Italy	8.700	36.900		45.600
3rd place, bronze medalist(s)	Japan	8.200	36.300		44.500
4	Belarus	7.600	36.500		44.100
5	China	8.650	33.800		42.450
6	Azerbaijan	7.050	31.100		38.050
7	Brazil	7.450	30.200		37.650
8	France	6.800	29.100		35.900

=== 3 Hoops + 4 Clubs ===
Rank	Nation	E Score	D Score	Pen.	Total
1st place, gold medalist(s)	Italy	8.575	33.700		42.275
2nd place, silver medalist(s)	RGF	7.750	33.200		40.950
3rd place, bronze medalist(s)	Japan	7.200	33.700		40.900
4	China	8.550	32.300		40.850
5	Spain	7.000	31.900	-0.05	38.850
6	Azerbaijan	7.050	31.700		38.750
7	Ukraine	7.450	31.100		38.550
8	Belarus	6.950	30.200		37.150

== Team ==
=== Combined Team Ranking ===
Place	Nation	Hoop (rhythmic gymnastics)	Ball (rhythmic gymnastics)	Clubs (rhythmic gymnastics)	Ribbon (rhythmic gymnastics)	5	3 + 2	Total
1st place, gold medalist(s)	RGF	55.000	57.425	56.400	47.400	46.250	42.100	304.575
2nd place, silver medalist(s)	Italy	49.750	49.000	50.900	41.925	44.350	41.650	277.575
3rd place, bronze medalist(s)	Belarus	41.250	50.975	53.750	44.500	44.900	40.500	275.875
4	Ukraine	48.500	51.300	51.700	42.450	37.350	38.350	269.650
5	Japan	44.700	50.100	46.550	41.875	45.000	39.900	268.125
6	China	42.800	43.600	44.200	37.800	42.250	39.950	250.600
7	Azerbaijan	42.750	43.750	43.750	36.425	39.600	38.000	244.275
8	Brazil	44.450	45.900	40.350	37.700	39.450	36.000	243.850
9	USA	41.700	44.700	39.150	39.150	37.500	36.600	238.800
10	Spain	38.850	40.050	43.900	36.900	34.800	39.150	233.650
11	Kazakhstan	40.600	46.150	42.400	37.300	28.500	29.950	224.900

== Medal table ==
* Host nation (Japan)

Rank	Nation	Gold	Silver	Bronze	Total
1	RGF	7	4	2	13
2	Italy	1	3	1	5
3	Belarus	1	2	4	7
4	Japan*	0	0	2	2
Totals (4 entries)		9	9	9	27
