= Anastasiya Malakanava =

Belarusian rhythmic gymnast

- Full name: Anastasiya Aliaxandrauna Malakanava
- Born: 1 May 2003 (age 23) Minsk, Belarus
- Height: 170 cm (5 ft 7 in)

Gymnastics career
- Discipline: Rhythmic gymnastics
- Country represented: Belarus (2021 - present)
- Club: Dinamo
- Head coach: Irina Leparskaya
Medal record
Representing Belarus
World Championships
Bronze medal – third place	2021 Kitakyushu	Team
Bronze medal – third place	2021 Kitakyushu	Group All-around
European Championships
Silver medal – second place	2021 Varna	Team

Anastasiya Aliaxandrauna Malakanava (Belarusian: Настасся Аляксандраўна Малаканава; born 1 May 2003) is a Belarusian group rhythmic gymnast. She is the 2021 World team and group all-around bronze medalist. She represented Belarus at the 2020 Summer Olympics where she finished fifth in the group all-around. She won a silver medal in the team event at the 2021 European Championships.

== Career ==
Malakanava competed at the Tashkent World Cup where the Belarusian group won the all-around bronze medal behind Uzbekistan and Israel. They won the silver medal in the 5 balls final behind Uzbekistan, and in the 3 hoops + 4 clubs behind Israel. She won a group all-around bronze medal at the Baku World Cup behind Bulgaria and Italy. They also won the bronze medal in the 3 hoops + 4 clubs final and placed fourth in the 5 balls. She then competed at the European Championships and won a silver medal in the team competition with the senior group and individuals Alina Harnasko and Anastasiia Salos. The Belarusian group finished fourth in the all-around and in 5 balls and finished eighth in 3 hoops + 4 clubs.

Malakanava was selected to represent Belarus at the 2020 Summer Olympics alongside Hanna Haidukevich, Anastasiya Rybakova, Arina Tsitsilina, Karyna Yarmolenka. In the qualification round, the group finished in eighth and qualified for the final spot in the final. Then in the group all-around final, the group improved to finish in fifth place. The same group then competed at the World Championships in Kitakyushu, Japan. They won the group all-around bronze medal behind Italy and Russia. This marked the first time Belarus won a World group all-around medal since 2014. In the apparatus finals, they finished fourth in 5 balls and eighth in 3 hoops + 4 clubs. The Belarusian team of Alina Harnasko, Anastasiia Salos, and the senior group won the team bronze medal behind Russia and Italy.

Malakanava did not compete in any international competitions in 2022 due to the International Gymnastics Federation banning Russian and Belarusian athletes due to the 2022 Russian invasion of Ukraine.
