= Gymnastics at the 2020 Summer Olympics – Women's rhythmic group all-around =

Women's rhythmic group all-around at the Games of the XXXII Olympiad
- Venue: Ariake Gymnastics Centre
- Date: 7 August 2021 (qualification); 8 August 2021 (final)
- Competitors: 70 from 14 nations
- Winning total: 92.100

Medalists
1st place, gold medalist(s)		Simona Dyankova; Stefani Kiryakova; Madlen Radukanova; Laura Traets; Erika Zafirova	Bulgaria
2nd place, silver medalist(s)		Anastasiia Bliznyuk; Anastasiia Maksimova; Angelina Shkatova; Anastasiia Tatareva; Alisa Tishchenko	ROC
3rd place, bronze medalist(s)		Martina Centofanti; Agnese Duranti; Alessia Maurelli; Daniela Mogurean; Martina Santandrea	Italy

The Women's rhythmic group all-around competition at the 2020 Summer Olympics were held at the Ariake Gymnastics Centre in Tokyo, Japan, with the qualification taking place at 7 August and the final on 8 August.

Russian rhythmic gymnasts were the five-time defending champions in the event.

== Competition format ==
The competition consisted of a qualification round and a final round. The top eight teams in the qualification round advance to the final round. In each round, the teams perform two routines (one with 5 balls, one with 3 hoops and 2 pairs of clubs), with the scores added to give a total.

== Results ==
=== Qualification ===
Rank	Team	5	3 + 2	Total	Qualification
1	Bulgaria; Simona Dyankova; Stefani Kiryakova; Madlen Radukanova; Laura Traets; Erika Zafirova	47.500 (1)	44.300 (1)	91.800	Q
2	ROC; Anastasiia Bliznyuk; Anastasiia Maksimova; Angelina Shkatova; Anastasiia Tatareva; Alisa Tishchenko	45.750 (2)	43.300 (3)	89.050	Q
3	Italy; Martina Centofanti; Agnese Duranti; Alessia Maurelli; Daniela Mogurean; Martina Santandrea	44.600 (3)	42.550 (4)	87.150	Q
4	Israel; Ofir Dayan; Yana Kramarenko; Natalie Raits; Yuliana Telegina; Karin Vexman	44.000 (4)	40.650 (7)	84.650	Q
5	China; Guo Qiqi; Hao Ting; Huang Zhangjiayang; Liu Xin; Xu Yanshu	41.600 (6)	42.000 (5)	83.600	Q
6	Ukraine; Mariola Bodnarchuk; Daryna Duda; Yeva Meleshchuk; Anastasiya Voznyak; Mariia Vysochanska	41.450 (7)	41.250 (6)	82.700	Q
7	Japan; Rie Matsubara; Sakura Noshitani; Sayuri Sugimoto; Ayuka Suzuki; Nanami Takenaka	40.400 (8)	39.325 (8)	79.725	Q
8	Belarus; Hanna Haidukevich; Anastasiya Malakanava; Anastasiya Rybakova; Arina Tsitsilina; Karyna Yarmolenka	36.000 (12)	43.650 (2)	79.650	Q
9	Uzbekistan; Kseniia Aleksandrova; Kamola Irnazarova; Dinara Ravshanbekova; Sevara Safoeva; Nilufar Shomuradova	42.100 (5)	36.900 (11)	79.000	R
10	Azerbaijan; Laman Alimuradova; Zeynab Hummatova; Yelyzaveta Luzan; Narmina Samadova; Darya Sorokina	36.700 (10)	37.650 (10)	74.350	R
11	United States; Isabelle Connor; Camilla Feeley; Lili Mizuno; Elizaveta Pletneva; Nicole Sladkov	37.850 (9)	35.825 (12)	73.675	
12	Brazil; Maria Eduarda Arakaki; Déborah Medrado; Nicole Pírcio; Geovanna Santos; Beatriz Silva	35.450 (13)	37.800 (9)	73.250	
13	Egypt; Login Elsasyed; Polina Fouda; Salma Saleh; Malak Selim; Tia Sobhy	36.300 (11)	33.050 (13)	69.350	
14	Australia; Emily Abbot; Alexandra Aristoteli; Alannah Mathews; Himeka Onoda; Felicity White	20.850 (14)	19.500 (14)	40.350	

=== Final ===
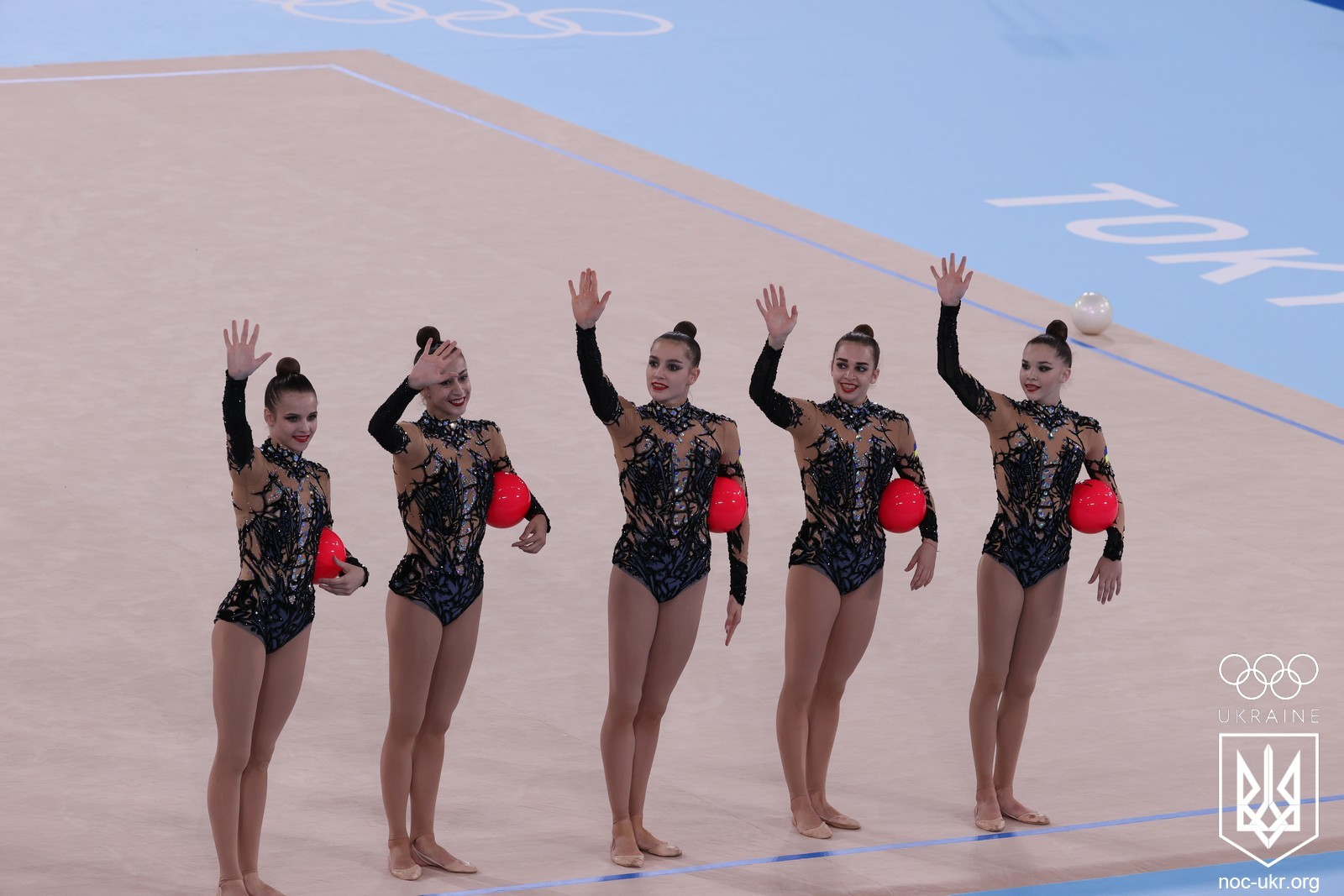
Ukrainian team after performing their ball routine in the group all-around final

Rank	Team	5	3 + 2	Total	Notes
1st place, gold medalist(s)	Bulgaria; Simona Dyankova; Stefani Kiryakova; Madlen Radukanova; Laura Traets; Erika Zafirova	47.550 (1)	44.550 (1)	92.100	
2nd place, silver medalist(s)	ROC; Anastasiia Bliznyuk; Anastasiia Maksimova; Angelina Shkatova; Anastasiia Tatareva; Alisa Tishchenko	46.200 (2)	44.500 (2)	90.700	
3rd place, bronze medalist(s)	Italy; Martina Centofanti; Agnese Duranti; Alessia Maurelli; Daniela Mogurean; Martina Santandrea	44.850 (4)	42.850 (3)	87.700	
4	China; Guo Qiqi; Hao Ting; Huang Zhangjiayang; Liu Xin; Xu Yanshu	42.150 (7)	42.400 (4)	84.550	
5	Belarus; Hanna Haidukevich; Anastasiya Malakanava; Anastasiya Rybakova; Arina Tsitsilina; Karyna Yarmolenka	45.750 (3)	38.300 (6)	84.050	
6	Israel; Ofir Dayan; Yana Kramarenko; Natalie Raits; Yuliana Telegina; Karin Vexman	44.100 (5)	39.750 (5)	83.850	
7	Ukraine; Mariola Bodnarchuk; Daryna Duda; Yeva Meleshchuk; Anastasiya Voznyak; Mariia Vysochanska	40.350 (8)	37.250 (7)	77.600	
8	Japan; Rie Matsubara; Sakura Noshitani; Sayuri Sugimoto; Ayuka Suzuki; Nanami Takenaka	42.750 (6)	29.750 (8)	72.500	
