= Maria Tolkacheva =

Russian rhythmic gymnast

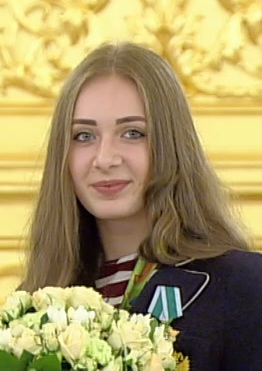
- Tolkacheva in 2016

Personal information
- Full name: Maria Yuryevna Tolkacheva
- Nickname: Masha
- Born: 8 August 1997 (age 29) Zhukovsky, Moscow Oblast, Russia
- Height: 176 cm (5 ft 9 in)

Gymnastics career
- Discipline: Rhythmic gymnastics
- Country represented: Russia & ROC (2013-2021)
- Gym: Novogorsk
- Head coach: Irina Viner
- Assistant coach: Anna Shumilova
Medal record
Group Rhythmic Gymnastics
International gymnastics competitions
Event	1st	2nd	3rd
Olympic Games	1	0	0
World Championships	11	4	1
European Championships	5	1	1
European Games	3	0	1
Total	22	5	3
Representing RGF
World Championships
Gold medal – first place	2021 Kitakyushu	Team
Gold medal – first place	2021 Kitakyushu	Group All-around
Gold medal – first place	2021 Kitakyushu	5 Balls
Silver medal – second place	2021 Kitakyushu	3 Hoops + 4 Clubs
Representing Russia
Olympic Games
Gold medal – first place	2016 Rio de Janeiro	Group All-around
World Championships
Gold medal – first place	2014 İzmir	2 Ribbon + 3 Balls
Gold medal – first place	2015 Stuttgart	Group All-around
Gold medal – first place	2015 Stuttgart	6 Clubs + 2 Hoops
Gold medal – first place	2017 Pesaro	Group All-around
Gold medal – first place	2017 Pesaro	3 Balls + 2 Ropes
Gold medal – first place	2018 Sofia	Group All-around
Gold medal – first place	2019 Baku	Group All-around
Gold medal – first place	2019 Baku	3 Hoops + 4 Clubs
Silver medal – second place	2015 Stuttgart	5 Ribbons
Silver medal – second place	2017 Pesaro	5 Hoops
Silver medal – second place	2018 Sofia	3 Balls + 2 Ropes
Bronze medal – third place	2019 Baku	5 Balls
European Games
Gold medal – first place	2015 Baku	Group All-Around
Gold medal – first place	2015 Baku	5 Ribbons
Gold medal – first place	2019 Minsk	5 Balls
Bronze medal – third place	2019 Minsk	Group All-around
European Championships
Gold medal – first place	2014 Baku	Group All-around
Gold medal – first place	2014 Baku	2 Ribbon + 3 Balls
Gold medal – first place	2016 Holon	Group All-around
Gold medal – first place	2018 Guadalajara	Team
Gold medal – first place	2018 Guadalajara	Group All-around
Silver medal – second place	2014 Baku	10 Clubs
Bronze medal – third place	2018 Guadalajara	5 Hoops

Maria Yuryevna Tolkacheva (Russian: Мария Юрьевна Толкачёва, IPA: [mɐˈrʲijə təlkɐˈtɕɵvə]; born 8 August 1997) is a Russian group rhythmic gymnast. She is the 2016 Olympics Group all-around champion, a four-time (2015, 2017-2019) World Group all-around champion, the 2015 European Games Group all-around champion and three-time European Championships (2014, 2016, 2018) Group all-around gold medalist.

== Career ==
Tolkacheva became an official member of the Russian national group in the 2014 season, she was member of the Russian group that won group all-around gold at the 2014 European Championships in Baku, Azerbaijan and at the 2014 World Championships in İzmir.

In 2015, Tolkacheva and the Russian group competed at the inaugural 2015 European Games, taking gold in group all-around and 5 ribbons. They ended their season by winning gold in Group all-around at the 2015 World Championships in Stuttgart, Germany, as well as gold in 6 Clubs/2 Hoops and silver in 5 Ribbons.

In 2016, Tolkacheva and the Russian group won group gold at the 2016 European Championships in Holon, Israel. On August 19–21, Tolkacheva was member of the golden winning Russian group (together with Anastasia Maksimova, Anastasiia Tatareva, Anastasia Bliznyuk, Vera Biryukova) that won gold at the 2016 Summer Olympics held in Rio de Janeiro, Brazil.

In 2018, Maria began her season at the 2018 Grand Prix Moscow: they won gold in group all-around, 3 balls + 2 ropes and silver medal in 5 hoops. She suffered an injury but she came back at the 2018 Grand Prix Holon winning gold in all-around and with balls and ropes. They competed at the 2018 European Championships in Guadalajara, Spain winning gold in the all-around competition and bronze with 5 hoops.

From October 29 to 31, she competed at the 2021 Rhythmic Gymnastics World Championships in Kitakyushu, Japan, together with the team formed by Alisa Tishchenko, Anastasia Bliznyuk, Polina Orlova and Angelina Shkatova and won gold in the team competition for the fifth time in a row, ahead of Italy and Belarus. They also won team gold (along with individuals, Dina and Arina Averina), gold in the 5-ball final, and silver (behind Italy) in the mixed final.

Since 2025, she has been working as a coach of Russian national group.

== Detailed Olympic results ==
Year	Competition Description	Location	Music	Apparatus	Rank	Score-Final	Rank	Score-Qualifying
2016	Olympics	Rio de Janeiro		All-around	1st	36.233	2nd	35.516
2016	Olympics	Rio de Janeiro	L'adoration De La Terre, Le Sacrifice - Danse Sacrale, Time, Forward! Igor Stravinsky, Moscow New Choir, Elena Rastvora, Russian Philharmonic Symphony Orchestra & Alexander Vedernikov	6 Clubs / 2 Hoops	1st	18.633	6th	17.233
2016	Olympics	Rio de Janeiro	Samba do Brasil, Those Were The Days by Bellini, Gruppa Na-Na	5 Ribbons	3rd	17.600	1st	18.283
