= Tetiana Dovzhenko =

Ukrainian rhythmic gymnast (born 2002)

- Born: 20 January 2002 (age 24) Donetsk, Ukraine

Gymnastics career
- Discipline: Rhythmic gymnastics
- Country represented: Ukraine
Medal record
World Championships
Bronze medal – third place	2018 Sofia	3 Balls + 2 Ropes
European Games
Silver medal – second place	2019 Minsk	3 Hoops and 4 Clubs

Tetiana Dovzhenko (Ukrainian: Тетяна Павлівна Довженко) is a Ukrainian female rhythmic gymnast. She is member of Ukrainian rhythmic gymnastics national team since 2017. At the 2018 Rhythmic Gymnastics World Championships in Sofia, she won bronze medal in team event.
