= Anastasia Tatareva =

Russian rhythmic gymnast

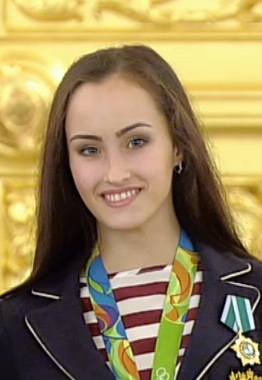
- Tatareva in 2016

Personal information
- Full name: Anastasiia Alekseyevna Tatareva
- Alternative name: Anastasiya Tatareva
- Born: 19 July 1997 (age 29) Ekaterinburg, Sverdlovsk Oblast, Russia
- Height: 165 cm (5 ft 5 in)

Gymnastics career
- Discipline: Rhythmic gymnastics
- Country represented: Russia & ROC (2014-present)
- Gym: Novogorsk
- Head coach: Tatiana Sergaeva
- Assistant coach: Anna Shumilova
- Choreographer: Svetlana Pomeratseva
Medal record

Group Rhythmic Gymnastics
Representing (Russia) ROC
Olympic Games
Silver medal – second place	2020 Tokyo	Group All-around
Representing Russia
Olympic Games
Gold medal – first place	2016 Rio de Janeiro	Group All-around
World Championships
Gold medal – first place	2014 Izmir	2 Ribbon + 3 Balls
Gold medal – first place	2015 Stuttgart	Group All-around
Gold medal – first place	2015 Stuttgart	6 Clubs + 2 Hoops
Gold medal – first place	2017 Pesaro	Group All-around
Gold medal – first place	2017 Pesaro	3 Balls + 2 Ropes
Gold medal – first place	2018 Sofia	Group All-around
Silver medal – second place	2015 Stuttgart	5 Ribbons
Silver medal – second place	2017 Pesaro	5 Hoops
Silver medal – second place	2018 Sofia	3 Balls + 2 Ropes
European Games
Gold medal – first place	2015 Baku	Group All-Around
Gold medal – first place	2015 Baku	5 Ribbons
European Championships
Gold medal – first place	2014 Baku	Group All-around
Gold medal – first place	2014 Baku	2 Ribbon + 3 Balls
Gold medal – first place	2016 Holon	Group All-around
Gold medal – first place	2018 Guadalajara	Team
Gold medal – first place	2018 Guadalajara	Group All-around
Gold medal – first place	2021 Varna	Team
Gold medal – first place	2021 Varna	Group All-around
Silver medal – second place	2014 Baku	10 Clubs
Silver medal – second place	2021 Varna	5 Balls
Bronze medal – third place	2018 Guadalajara	5 Hoops

Anastasia Alekseyevna Tatareva (Russian: Анастасия Алексеевна Татарева, IPA: [ɐnəstɐˈsʲijə tɐˈtarʲɪvə]; born 19 July 1997) is a Russian group rhythmic gymnast. She is the 2016 Olympics Group all-around champion, a three-time (2015, 2017, 2018) World Group all-around champion, the 2015 European Games Group all-around champion, and three-time European Championships (2014, 2016, 2018) Group all-around gold medalist.

== Career ==
Tatareva began rhythmic gymnastics in her hometown junior sports school "Viktoria." She became an official member of the Russian national group in the 2014 season.

In 2015, Tatareva and the Russian group competed at the inaugural 2015 European Games, taking gold in group all-around and 5 ribbons. They ended their season by winning gold in Group all-around at the 2015 World Championships in Stuttgart, Germany, as well as gold in 6 Clubs/2 Hoops and silver in 5 Ribbons.

In 2016, Tatareva and the Russian group won group gold at the 2016 European Championships in Holon, Israel. On August 19 to 21, Tatareva was a member of the golden winning Russian group together with Anastasia Maksimova, Maria Tolkacheva, Anastasia Bliznyuk, Vera Biryukova that won gold at the 2016 Summer Olympics held in Rio de Janeiro, Brazil.

== Detailed Olympic results ==
Year	Competition Description	Location	Music	Apparatus	Rank	Score-Final	Rank	Score-Qualifying
2020	Olympics	Tokyo		All-around	2nd	90.700	2nd	89.050
2020	Olympics	Tokyo	Prince Igor: Polovetskie tancy s khorom by Symphony Orchestra of State Moscow	5 Balls	2nd	46.200	2nd	45.750
2020	Olympics	Tokyo	Ruslan and Liudmila by State Symphony Orchestra of USSR	3 Hoops + 4 Clubs	2nd	44.500	3rd	43.300
2016	Olympics	Rio de Janeiro		All-around	1st	36.233	2nd	35.516
2016	Olympics	Rio de Janeiro	L'adoration De La Terre, Le Sacrifice - Danse Sacrale, Time, Forward! Igor Stravinsky, Moscow New Choir, Elena Rastvora, Russian Philharmonic Symphony Orchestra & Alexander Vedernikov	6 Clubs / 2 Hoops	1st	18.633	6th	17.233
2016	Olympics	Rio de Janeiro	Samba do Brasil, Those Were The Days by Bellini, Gruppa Na-Na	5 Ribbons	3rd	17.600	1st	18.283
