= Anastasia Maksimova =

Russian rhythmic gymnast

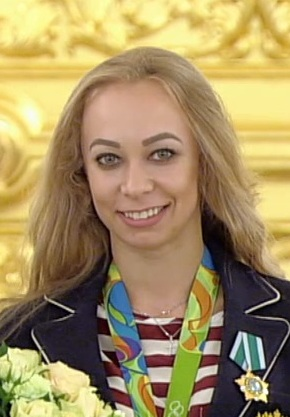
- Maksimova in 2016

Personal information
- Full name: Anastasia Ivanovna Maksimova
- Alternative name: Anastasiia Maximova
- Nickname: Nastia
- Born: 27 June 1991 (age 35) Petrozavodsk, Russian SFSR, Soviet Union
- Height: 171 cm (5 ft 7 in)

Gymnastics career
- Discipline: Rhythmic gymnastics
- Country represented: Russia & ROC (2008–2016, 2019-)
- Club: Dynamo Moscow
- Gym: Novogorsk
- Head coach: Irina Viner
- Assistant coach: Tatiana Sergaeva
- Choreographer: Tatiana Pomerantseva
- Retired: no
Medal record
Group Rhythmic Gymnastics
International gymnastics competitions
Event	1st	2nd	3rd
Olympic Games	1	1	0
World Championships	7	1	4
European Games	3	0	1
European Championships	5	1	0
Summer Universiade	3	0	0
Total	16	2	3
Representing ROC
Olympic Games
Silver medal – second place	2020 Tokyo	Group All-around
Representing Russia
Olympic Games
Gold medal – first place	2016 Rio de Janeiro	Group All-around
World Championships
Gold medal – first place	2009 Mie	5 Hoops
Gold medal – first place	2013 Kyiv	3 Balls + 2 Ribbons
Gold medal – first place	2014 İzmir	3 Balls + 2 Ribbons
Gold medal – first place	2015 Stuttgart	Group All-around
Gold medal – first place	2015 Stuttgart	6 Clubs + 2 Hoops
Gold medal – first place	2019 Baku	Group All-around
Gold medal – first place	2019 Baku	3 Hoops + 4 Clubs
Silver medal – second place	2015 Stuttgart	5 Ribbons
Bronze medal – third place	2009 Mie	Group All-around
Bronze medal – third place	2009 Mie	3 Ribbons + 2 Ropes
Bronze medal – third place	2013 Kyiv	Group All-around
Bronze medal – third place	2019 Baku	5 Balls
European Games
Gold medal – first place	2015 Baku	Group All-around
Gold medal – first place	2015 Baku	5 Ribbons
Gold medal – first place	2019 Minsk	5 Balls
Bronze medal – third place	2019 Minsk	Group All-around
European Championships
Gold medal – first place	2014 Baku	Group All-around
Gold medal – first place	2014 Baku	3 Balls + 2 Ribbons
Gold medal – first place	2016 Holon	Group All-around
Gold medal – first place	2021 Varna	Team
Gold medal – first place	2021 Varna	Group All-around
Silver medal – second place	2014 Baku	10 Clubs
Silver medal – second place	2021 Varna	5 Balls
Summer Universiade
Gold medal – first place	2013 Kazan	Group All-around
Gold medal – first place	2013 Kazan	10 Clubs
Gold medal – first place	2013 Kazan	3 Balls + 2 Ribbons

Anastasia Ivanovna Maksimova (Russian: Анастасия Ивановна Максимова, IPA: [ɐnəstɐˈsʲijə mɐˈksʲiməvə]; born 27 June 1991) is a Russian group rhythmic gymnast. She is the 2016 Olympics Group champion, the 2015 Worlds Group All-around champion, two-time World Group All-around bronze medalist and three-time European (2021, 2016, 2014) Group All-around champion.

== Career ==
A veteran in the Russian Group, Maksimova has competed in 4 World Championships, Maksimova appeared in her first Worlds in 2009 (Mie, Japan) where the Russian Group won bronze in Group all-around.

Maksimova was member of the Russian Group that won the gold medals at the 2013 Summer Universiade in Group All-around, 10 clubs and 2 ribbons/3 balls. Maksimova and the Russian Group won the gold medals in Group All-around, 10 clubs and 2 ribbons/3 balls at the 2013 World Cup series in St. Petersburg, Russia.

In 2014, Maksimova with the Russian Group became the 2014 European Group all-around champions, in event finals, they won gold in 2Ribbon / 3Balls and silver in 10 Clubs. They repeated as the 2014 World Cup series Group all-around champions and won gold in 10 clubs.

In 2015, Maksimova was member of the Russian Group that won gold at the inaugural 2015 European Games, they took gold in Group all-around and 5 Ribbons. At the 2015 World Cup Budapest, Maksimova with the Russian Group won gold in Group all-around, 5 Ribbons and bronze in 6 clubs / 2 Hoops.

In 9–13 September, Maksimova together with other members of Russian Group (Diana Borisova, Daria Kleshcheva, Sofya Skomorokh, Anastasia Tatareva and Maria Tolkacheva) competed at the 2015 World Championships in Stuttgart where they won the Group all-around title, eight years later; since the Russian Group won the all-around title in 2007. In apparatus finals, they won gold in 6 Clubs / 2 Hoop and silver in 5 Ribbons.

In 2016, Maksimova and the Russian group won group gold at the 2016 European Championships in Holon, Israel. On 19–21 August, Maksimova was member of the golden winning Russian group (together with Anastasiia Tatareva, Maria Tolkacheva, Anastasia Bliznyuk, Vera Biryukova) that won gold at the 2016 Summer Olympics held in Rio de Janeiro, Brazil.

Shortly after the Olympics, Maksimova completed her competitive sports career by the end of the 2016 Season.

She was selected to represent Russia in group competition at the 2020 Olympic Games in Tokyo, Japan together with Anastasia Tatareva, Anastasia Bliznyuk, Angelina Shkatova and Alisa Tishchenko.

== Detailed Olympic results ==
Year	Competition Description	Location	Music	Apparatus	Rank	Score-Final	Rank	Score-Qualifying
2020	Olympics	Tokyo		All-around	2nd	90.700	2nd	89.050
2020	Olympics	Tokyo	Prince Igor: Polovetskie tancy s khorom by Symphony Orchestra of State Moscow	5 Balls	2nd	46.200	2nd	45.750
2020	Olympics	Tokyo	Ruslan and Liudmila by State Symphony Orchestra of USSR	3 Hoops + 4 Clubs	2nd	44.500	3rd	43.300
2016	Olympics	Rio de Janeiro		All-around	1st	36.233	2nd	35.516
2016	Olympics	Rio de Janeiro	L'adoration De La Terre, Le Sacrifice - Danse Sacrale, Time, Forward! Igor Stravinsky, Moscow New Choir, Elena Rastvora, Russian Philharmonic Symphony Orchestra & Alexander Vedernikov	6 Clubs / 2 Hoops	1st	18.633	6th	17.233
2016	Olympics	Rio de Janeiro	Samba do Brasil, Those Were The Days by Bellini, Gruppa Na-Na	5 Ribbons	3rd	17.600	1st	18.283
