= Anastasiia Salos =

Belarusian rhythmic gymnast

- Full name: Anastasiia Maksimovna Salos
- Alternative name: Anastasia Maximovna Salos
- Nickname: Nastya
- Born: 18 February 2002 (age 24) Barnaul, Russia

Gymnastics career
- Discipline: Rhythmic gymnastics
- Country represented: Belarus Authorised Neutral Athletes (since 2024); (2015-2025)
- Former countries represented: Russia
- Club: Dinamo
- Head coach: Irina Leparskaya
- Assistant coach: Larisa Lukyanenko
- Retired: 19 October 2025
Medal record
Event	1st	2nd	3rd
World Championships	0	0	3
European Championships	0	2	3
Summer Universiade	0	0	1
FIG World Cup	1	7	10
Grand Prix Final	0	2	3
Total	1	11	20
Rhythmic Gymnastics
Representing Belarus and Authorised Neutral Athletes
World Championships
Bronze medal – third place	2019 Baku	Team
Bronze medal – third place	2021 Kitakyushu	Team
Bronze medal – third place	2021 Kitakyushu	Clubs
European Championships
Silver medal – second place	2021 Varna	Team
Silver medal – second place	2019 Baku	Team
Bronze medal – third place	2020 Kyiv	All-around
Bronze medal – third place	2021 Varna	Hoop
Bronze medal – third place	2021 Varna	Clubs
Summer Universiade
Bronze medal – third place	2025 Rhine-Rhur	Clubs
Grand Prix Final
Silver medal – second place	2020 Kyiv	Ball
Silver medal – second place	2020 Kyiv	Clubs
Bronze medal – third place	2020 Kyiv	All-around
Bronze medal – third place	2020 Kyiv	Hoop
Bronze medal – third place	2020 Kyiv	Ribbon

Anastasiia Maksimovna Salos (Belarusian: Настасся Максімаўна Салас; Russian: Анастасия Максимовна Салос; born 18 February 2002) is a retired individual rhythmic gymnast who represented Belarus. She is the 2020 European Championships All-around bronze medalist, as well as the 2019 World Championships Team bronze medalist and 2019 European Championships Team silver medalist.

== Personal life ==
She studies coaching at Belarusian State University of Physical Culture in Minsk.

== Career ==
Salos began rhythmic gymnastics at the age of 4 in her hometown of Barnaul, Russia. Her parents wanted to find an activity in which she could burn off her excess energy, so her mother took her to a gymnastics class. In 2014 she moved to Belarus to join the national team there.

=== Junior ===
Salos started appearing in international competitions in 2016, competing at the Tart Cup where she won gold in the team event and placed second in the junior all-around. In 2017 Salos competed at the Alina Cup (held with Grand Prix Moscow) where she won bronze in the junior all-around. She then competed at the International Tournament Deriugina Cup, winning the junior all-around and qualifying to all 4 apparatus finals. She also won silver in the junior all-around at the 2017 Aeon Cup.

=== Senior ===
==== 2018 ====
In 2018, Salos made her senior debut at the 2018 LA Lights competition. She then went on to win silver in the International Tournament Moscow. On 30 March – 1 April Salos competed at her first senior World Cup event at 2018 World Cup Sofia, placing 5th in the all-around and qualifying to all 4 apparatus finals. Her next World Cup event was 2018 World Cup Pesaro, where she won bronze with ball. She first won her all-around medal at 2018 World Cup Baku, winning bronze behind Maria Sergeeva and Vlada Nikolchenko. Salos also won bronze at the 2018 World Challenge Cup Guadalajara with ball, and at the 2018 World Challenge Cup Minsk she won silver with ball and bronze with clubs. At the 2018 Rhythmic Gymnastics World Championships she placed 10th in the all-around and qualified to the ribbon final, where she placed 5th.

==== 2019 ====
Salos began her 2019 season competing at the 2019 LA Lights competition, finishing 5th in the all-around. Her next competition was 2019 Grand Prix Moscow, where she placed 5th in the all-around and won bronze with ribbon. On 2–3 March she competed at the 2019 Grand Prix Marbella, where she won the bronze medal in the all-around behind Dina Averina and Aleksandra Soldatova. She qualified to all 4 apparatus finals, placing 4th with the ribbon, 5th with the clubs, 6th with the ball, and 8th with the hoop. Salos went on to win the all-around gold medal at the 2019 Deriugina Cup International Tournament, finishing ahead of Olena Diachenko and Maria Sergeeva. She also won gold with the ball and ribbon, and silver with hoop and clubs. At the 2019 Grand Prix Thiais she finished 9th in the all-around and qualified for 2 apparatus finals, placing 4th with hoop and clubs. Her first World Cup event was at the 2019 World Cup Sofia, where she finished 10th in the all-around and placed 5th at the ribbon final. On 16–18 April Salos took part in the 2019 European Championships, where she won the silver medal in the team event (with Katsiaryna Halkina, Alina Harnasko, and Junior group) and qualified for 3 apparatus finals. During the apparatus finals she finished 4th with ribbon and 5th with hoop and clubs. Competing at the 2019 Grand Prix Holon she won her first all-around Grand Prix all-around gold medal, where she also won gold with ball, silver with ribbon, and bronze with clubs.

==== 2021 ====
In 2021, Salos began her season at the Sofia World Cup at the end of March, where she placed fourth behind her compatriot Alina Harnasko overall, and in the finals, she earned silver in rim and ribbon and 5th place. in ball. In the next cup, at the Tashkent World Cup, where she obtained the complete bronze behind the Russian Arina Averina, the bronze in hoop final, 5th place in ball final and 4th in ribbon final. At the Pesaro World Cup in late May, she placed fifth behind Israeli Linoy Ashram, and in the finals she was fourth in hoop and ball and eighth in ribbon. From 9–13 June, Salos competed in the 2021 European Championships in Varna, Bulgaria, where in the general final, she obtained fifth place behind Israeli Linoy Ashram, and in the apparatus finals, she obtained bronze in the hoop. and clubs, seventh place in ribbon and eighth place in ball. At the beginning of July, she competed in the Minsk World Cup, where she obtained bronze in the general classification behind Russia's Lala Kramarenko, and in the finals by apparatus, she obtained silver in rim and ribbon, bronze in ball and fifth place in clubs. Two weeks later, the last competition before the Olympic Games, he competed in the Tel Aviv Grand Prix, where he obtained bronze in the general classification and in the finals he obtained silver in the ring, bronze in ball and clubs and ribbon. From 6–8 August, Salos competed in the Tokyo 2020 Olympic Games. On the first day, she made it to the All-around finals after finishing 5th behind compatriot Alina Harnasko. On the second day, the day of the grand final, various mistakes left Salos in 8th place behind Israeli Nicol Zelikman.

==== 2022 ====
On 7 March 2022, the FIG banned all Russian and Belarusian athletes from competing until further notice due to the Russian invasion of Ukraine.

==== 2024 ====
In 2024, FIG allowed Belarusian athletes to compete under a neutral flag, but only as individual gymnasts, not in groups. On 10–12 May, Salos made her first appearance at FIG World Cup series after two years in Portimão, Portugal. She took 14th place in All-around and did not advance into apparatus finals. On 12–14 July, she competed at World Challenge Cup Cluj-Napoca and ended on 19th place in All-around.

==== 2025 ====
In 2025, Salos competed at Sofia World Cup, where she took 17th place in all-around due to mistakes in her clubs and ribbon routines. She qualified to hoop final and took 7th place. On 18–20 April, she competed at the Baku World Cup and finished 6th in all-around. She qualified to three apparatus finals - winning bronze in hoop, placing 7th in ribbon and 8th in ball.

On 17–19 July, she took 6th place in the all-around at the 2025 Summer Universiade in Essen. In the apparatus finals, she won bronze in clubs.

In October, she announced her retirement at the Lobatch Rhythmic Gymnastics Tournament, where she said she intended to continue to be involved with the sport as a coach.

== Routine music information ==
Year	Apparatus	Music title
2025	Hoop	Horse Races (2023) by UUTAi
2025	Ball	Black Book by ORI
2025	Clubs	Tribletrouble by bard beadle
2025	Ribbon	Once in the Street by Nino Katamadze & Insight
2024	Hoop	Horse Races (2023) by UUTAi
2024	Ball	Carmen by Antonio de Lucena
2024	Clubs	El Choclo (Arr. E. Runge and J. Ammon) by Cello Project
2024	Ribbon	Requiem by Aram MP3 & Forsh
2023	Hoop	Orobroy by David Peña Dorantes
2023	Ball	Dostochka by DakhaBakha
2023	Clubs	Haze by Power-Haus, Christian Reindl & Lucie Paradis
2023	Ribbon	I Will Survive by Musica Nuda
2022	Hoop	Nemesis by Benjamin Clementine
2022	Ball	Zeme Sukis Greitai by Alina Orlova
2022	Clubs	Haze by Power-Haus, Christian Reindl & Lucie Paradis
2022	Ribbon	Diabolo by Xavier Mortimer & Maxime Rodriguez
2021	Hoop	Damina by Mgzavrebi
2021	Ball	Magic Mirror by Xavier Mortimer & Maxime Rodriguez
2021	Clubs	Between Heaven and Earth by Camerata
2021	Ribbon	The Flight Attendant by Blake Neely
2020	Hoop	Damina by Mgzavrebi
2020	Ball	Compassion by Ilya Beshevli
2020	Clubs	Between Heaven and Earth by Camerata
2020	Ribbon	Il Trovatore by Therion
2019	Hoop	Primavera Tango by Gustavo Montesano & Royal Philharmonic Orchestra & Carlos Gomez
2019	Ball	Progeria by Bachar Mar-Khalifé
2019	Clubs	Feel It Still by Portugal. The Man
2019	Ribbon	Dominicano by Egor Grushin
2018	Hoop	Primavera Tango by Gustavo Montesano & Royal Philharmonic Orchestra & Carlos Gomez
2018	Ball	Chanter by Mireille Mathieu
2018	Clubs	Spy Wedding by Danny Elfman and John Debney
2018	Ribbon	Belleville Rendez-Vous (from The Triplets of Belleville) by Béatrice Bonifassi

== Detailed Olympic results ==
Year	Competition Description	Location	Music	Apparatus	Rank-Final	Score-Final	Rank-Qualifying	Score-Qualifying
2020	Olympics	Tokyo		All-around	8th	95.175	5th	99.150
2020	Olympics	Tokyo	Damina by Mgzavrebi	Hoop	6th	25.425	4th	25.700
2020	Olympics	Tokyo	Magic Mirror by Xavier Mortimer & Maxime Rodriguez	Ball	10th	23.000	5th	26.300
2020	Olympics	Tokyo	Between Heaven and Earth by Camerata	Clubs	9th	24.950	11th	24.550
2020	Olympics	Tokyo	The Flight Attendant by Blake Neely	Ribbon	6th	21.800	4th	22.600

== Competitive highlights ==
(Team competitions in seniors are held only at the World Championships, Europeans and other Continental Games.)

International: Senior
Year	Event	AA	Team	Hoop	Ball	Clubs	Ribbon
2025	Summer Universiade	6th		9th (Q)	12th (Q)	3rd	5th
2025	World Challenge Cup Portimao	5th		2nd	15th (Q)	5th	3rd
2025	World Cup Baku	6th		3rd	8th	20th (Q)	7th
2025	World Cup Sofia	17th		7th		29th (Q)	32nd (Q)
2024	World Challenge Cup Cluj-Napoca	19th		12th (Q)	19th (Q)	23rd (Q)	16th (Q)
2024	World Challenge Cup Portimao	14th		25th (Q)	14th (Q)	12th (Q)	10th (Q)
2021	World Championships	10th	3rd	62nd (Q)	14th (Q)	3rd	11th (Q)
2021	Grand Prix Tel Aviv	3rd		2nd	3rd	3rd	3rd
2021	World Cup Minsk	3rd		2nd	3rd	5th	2nd
2021	European Championships	5th	2nd	3rd	8th	3rd	7th
2021	World Cup Pesaro	5th		4th	4th	18th (Q)	8th
2021	World Cup Tashkent	3rd		3rd	5th	10th (Q)	4th
2021	World Cup Sofia	4th		2nd	5th	17th (Q)	2nd
2020	European Championships	3rd					
2020	International Tournament of Marina Lobatch	2nd	1st	1st	2nd		1st
2020	Grand Prix Kyiv	3rd		3rd	2nd	2nd	3rd
2020	Grand Prix Brno	2nd					
2020	Grand Prix Moscow			2nd	2nd		
2020	LA Lights Tournament	2nd					
2019	World Championships	14th	3rd	8th		23rd (Q)	7th
2019	Grand Prix Marbella	3rd					
2019	World Cup Portimao	7th		2nd	10th (Q)	3rd	19th (Q)
2019	World Cup Cluj-Napoca	9th		8th	12th (Q)	21st (Q)	9th (Q)
2019	World Cup Minsk	8th		8th	11th (Q)	19th (Q)	8th
2019	European Championships		2nd		5th	5th	4th
2019	World Cup Baku	8th		7th	8th	25th (Q)	1st
2019	World Cup Sofia	10th		14th (Q)	18th (Q)	17th (Q)	5th
2018	World Championships	10th	6th	26th (Q)	16th (Q)	11th (Q)	5th
2018	European Championships	10th					
2018	World Cup Minsk	7th		9th	2nd	3rd	8th
2018	World Cup Guadalajara	6th		3rd	4th	4th	9th (Q)
2018	World Cup Baku	3rd		6th	5th	7th	7th
2018	World Cup Pesaro	6th		4th	3rd	8th	8th
2018	World Cup Sofia	5th		4th	8th	6th	6th
National
Year	Event	AA	Team	Hoop	Ball	Clubs	Ribbon
2020	Belarusian Championships	1st		1st		2nd	1st
2019	Belarusian Championships	1st		1st	2nd	2nd	2nd
Q = Qualifications (Did not advance to Event Final due to the 2 gymnast per country rule, only Top 8 highest score); WR = World Record; WD = Withdrew; NT = No Team Competition; DNS = Did Not Start
