= Russian Rhythmic Gymnastics Federation =

Sports governing body in Russia

- Abbreviation: VFHG
- Formation: 1991; 35 years ago
- Type: National sports governing body
- Location: Moscow, Luzhnetskaya nab., 8
- Region served: Russia
- President: Irina Viner
- Affiliations: Ministry of Sport (Russia)
- Website: www.vfrg.ru

The Russian Rhythmic Gymnastics Federation (Russian: Всероссийская федерация художественной гимнастики, romanized: Vserossiyskaya federatsiya khudozhestvennoy gimnastiki, lit. 'All-Russian Federation of Rhythmic Gymnastics') was the governing body of rhythmic gymnastics in Russia.

On 1 October 2024, it was merged into the Russian Gymnastics Federation together with four other Russian sports federations governing specific gymnastics disciplines.

== History ==
The All-Russian Rhythmic Gymnastics Federation was founded in 1963. It was the central department of the Rhythmic Gymnastics Federation of the Soviet Union. It was responsible for training and preparing athletes for international competition in the Russian SFSR.

The current Russian Rhythmic Gymnastics Federation was founded in 1991. The founding conference was held in Ivanovo on 12 September 1991.

Later, the federation was restructured at a report and election conference in 2001. Sergei Yastrzhembsky, an Adviser to the President of Russia, was elected president of the organization and remained in this position for two consecutive terms. In December 2008, head coach of the national team Irina Viner was elected president, and she now combines the post with that of the head coach.

The Russian Rhythmic Gymnastics Federation is accredited by the Russian Ministry of Sport and has been officially given the status of the country's governing body for the sport of rhythmic gymnastics.

After the 2022 Russian invasion of Ukraine, the International Gymnastics Federation (FIG) barred Russian athletes and officials, including judges. It also announced that "all FIG World Cup and World Challenge Cup events planned to take place in Russia ... are cancelled, and no other FIG events will be allocated to Russia ... until further notice." FIG also banned the Russian flag and anthem at its events. European Gymnastics announced in March 2022 that no athletes, officials, and judges from the Russian Gymnastics Federation and the Belarus Gymnastics Association can participate in any European Gymnastics events, that no European Gymnastics authorities from Russia and Belarus can pursue their functions, and that European Gymnastics had removed from its calendar all events allocated to Russia and Belarus and would not allocate any future events to Russia or Belarus.

== Events ==
The Russian Rhythmic Gymnastics Federation organized a number of rhythmic gymnastics competitions in Russia. Those include:

Competition	Frequency
Russian Rhythmic Gymnastics Championships	Annually
Russian Junior Rhythmic Gymnastics Championships	Annually

== Administration ==
- Irina Viner — President
- Andrey Guryev — First Vice President
- Mikhail Kusnirovich — Vice President
- Natalia Kuzmina — Vice President
- Irina Tchachina — Vice President
- Evgenia Kanaeva — Vice President
- Tatyana Kolesnikova — Vice President
- Aleksandr Bryksin — Vice President
- Irina Tsaryova — Executive Director
- Tatiana Gorbunova — Executive Secretary

== See also ==
- Russian Artistic Gymnastics Federation
