= Letizia Cicconcelli =

Italian rhythmic gymnast

- Full name: Letizia Cicconcelli
- Born: 7 October 1999 (age 26)
- Height: 170 cm (5 ft 7 in)

Gymnastics career
- Discipline: Rhythmic gymnastics
- Country represented: Italy (2015-2021)
- Club: Faber Ginnastica Fabriano
- Head coach: Emanuela Maccarani
- Choreographer: Federica Bagnera
Medal record
Representing Italy
Group Rhythmic Gymnastics
World Championships
Gold medal – first place	2018 Sofia	3 Balls + 2 Ropes
Silver medal – second place	2018 Sofia	Group All-around
Bronze medal – third place	2018 Sofia	5 Hoops
Bronze medal – third place	2019 Baku	3 Hoops + 4 Clubs
European Championships
Gold medal – first place	2018 Guadalajara	5 Hoops
Silver medal – second place	2018 Guadalajara	Group All-around
Silver medal – second place	2018 Guadalajara	3 Balls + 2 Ropes

Letizia Cicconcelli (born 7 October 1999) is an Italian group rhythmic gymnast. A member of the national squad since 2015, she is the 2018 World Group All-around silver medalist and two-time European (2018) Group All-around silver medalist.

== Career ==
=== Junior ===
She first appeared in Italian National team in 2013, when she was a member of a junior group which competed at the 2013 European Junior Championships and placed 6th in Group All-around and in 5 Hoops Final as well. A year later, she competed as individual at the 2014 European Junior Championships and took 6th place in Team competition together with teammates Maria Vilucchi, Arianna Malavasi and Ginevra Fiore Parrini. She was the most successful amongst them and qualified for both apparatus finals she competed with. She ended on 6th place with ball and 7th place with ribbon.

=== Senior ===
In 2015 she made her senior debut at Italian National Championships where she won the bronze medal in All-Around behind Veronica Bertolini and Alessia Russo. She earned a spot to compete at the 2015 World Championships in Stuttgart, Germany. She and her previously mentioned teammates took 14th place in the Team competition and she placed 52nd in Ribbon Qualifications.

In 2016, she took the silver medal in All-around at Italian National Championships behind Veronica Bertolini. She also took bronze medal in Hoop Final and two silver medals in Ball and Ribbon Final.

In 2018, she joined Italian senior group and replaced injured Beatrice Tornatore at the 2018 European Championships in Guadalajara, Spain and won her first medals from this major international competition. Together with teammates Alessia Maurelli, Martina Centofanti, Agnese Duranti, Anna Basta and Martina Santandrea they won the silver medal in Group All-around and in 3 Balls + 2 Ropes Final, while they took the gold medal in 5 Hoops Final. Later that year they competed at the 2018 World Championships in Sofia, Bulgaria and won the gold medal in 3 Balls + 2 Ropes Final, silver in Group All-around and bronze in 5 Hoops Final. By placing in the top 3 in Group All-around they also qualified for the 2020 Summer Olympics in Tokyo, Japan.

In 2019, she and her group won the bronze medal in the 3 Hoops + 4 Clubs Final at the 2019 World Championships in Baku, Azerbaijan.

On 14 June 2021, she announced her retirement from competitive sport due to a back injury.
