= Beatrice Tornatore =

Italian rhythmic gymnast

- Born: 21 July 1999 (age 27) Padua, Italy

Gymnastics career
- Discipline: Rhythmic gymnastics
- Country represented: Italy (2015–present)
- Club: Ardor Padova
- Head coach: Emanuela Maccarani
Medal record
Representing Italy
Group Rhythmic Gymnastics
World Championships
Gold medal – first place	2017 Pesaro	5 Hoops

Beatrice Tornatore (born 21 July 1999) is an Italian group rhythmic gymnast. She is a part of the group that won the 2017 World Championships in 5 hoops.

== Personal life ==
Beatrice Tornatore was born on 21 July 1999, in Padua. She began gymnastics at age six.

== Career ==
Tornatore was added to the top group for the Italian rhythmic gymnastics national team in September 2016 after several gymnasts retired following the 2016 Olympics. Her first competition with the main team was the 2017 Grand Prix in Thiais where the group won the gold in the all-around and silver in both event finals (3 Balls + 2 Ropes and 5 hoops). The Italian group competed in five World Cup events. In Pesaro they won the silver in the group all-around behind Bulgaria but gold in both event finals. In Baku, they once again won the silver in the group all-around behind Bulgaria, and they won the gold in 5 hoops and finished 4th in 3 Balls + 2 Ropes. Then in Portimão, they won gold in the group all-around and 5 hoops. In Minsk, they won the gold in the group all-around and silver in 3 Balls + 2 Ropes. Finally, in Kazan, they won the silver in the group all-around behind Russia.

She competed at the 2017 World Championships in Pesaro alongside Anna Basta, Martina Centofanti, Agnese Duranti, Alessia Maurelli, and Martina Santandrea. The team finished fourth in the group all-around competition and in the 3 Balls + 2 Ropes, but they won the gold medal in the 5 hoops- preventing Russia from sweeping the gold medals in every single event.
