= 2018 Rhythmic Gymnastics World Championships =

36th Rhythmic Gymnastics World Championships
- Venue: Arena Armeec
- Location: Sofia, Bulgaria
- Start date: 10 September 2018
- End date: 16 September 2018
- Competitors: 362 from 61 nations

The 2018 Rhythmic Gymnastics World Championships were held in Sofia, Bulgaria, from 10 to 16 September 2018 at Arena Armeec. The top three countries in the group all-around, Russia, Italy, and Bulgaria won the first three spots for the 2020 Olympic Games. Russia was the most successful nation of the competition with seven of the nine gold medals, and Bulgaria and Italy each won a title.

On 11 September, Russia's Dina Averina won the first two gold medals of the competition, in the hoop and ball event finals. In the hoop final, Linoy Ashram won the silver medal, the best-ever result for Israel at the Rhythmic Gymnastics World Championships, and in the ball final, Alexandra Agiurgiuculese won Italy's first individual medal in twenty-seven years. Then on 13 September, Averina won the clubs gold medal, and Aleksandra Soldatova won the ribbon gold medal. Milena Baldassarri won the silver medal in the ribbon final, the best-ever result for Italy in the individual events of the Rhythmic Gymnastics World Championships. In the team final, Russia won the gold medal, Bulgaria won a team medal for the first time since 2001 with the silver, and Italy won its first-ever team medal with the bronze. On 14 September, Averina defended her World all-around title ahead of Ashram and Soldatova. Russia won the gold medal in the group all-around, ahead of Italy and Bulgaria. In the group event finals, Bulgaria won gold in 5 hoops, and Italy won gold in 3 balls + 2 ropes.

== Participating nations ==
Participants	Nations
Group + 4 individuals	Belarus Egypt Spain South Korea
Group + 3 individuals	Austria Azerbaijan Brazil Bulgaria Canada China Estonia Finland Hungary Israel Italy Japan; Kazakhstan Mexico Poland Russia Slovenia Serbia Ukraine United States Uzbekistan
Group + 2 individuals	Australia Czech Republic Germany India Turkey
Group + 1 individual	France Georgia Greece New Zealand North Korea
Group	Switzerland
4 individuals	Bosnia and Herzegovina Lithuania South Africa
3 individuals	Andorra Armenia Belgium Croatia Great Britain Latvia Malaysia Norway Portugal Romania Slovakia
2 individuals	Chile Denmark Kyrgyzstan Moldova Puerto Rico San Marino Thailand
1 individual	Cyprus Lebanon Montenegro Sri Lanka

== Medal winners ==
Event	Gold	Silver	Bronze
Team Competition
Team All-Around	Russia Arina Averina; Dina Averina; Aleksandra Soldatova	Bulgaria Boryana Kaleyn; Katrin Taseva; Neviana Vladinova	Italy Alexandra Agiurgiuculese; Milena Baldassarri; Alessia Russo
Individual Finals
Hoop	Dina Averina (RUS)	Linoy Ashram (ISR)	Arina Averina (RUS)
Ball	Dina Averina (RUS)	Aleksandra Soldatova (RUS)	Alexandra Agiurgiuculese (ITA)
Clubs	Dina Averina (RUS)	Katsiaryna Halkina (BLR)	Arina Averina (RUS)
Ribbon	Aleksandra Soldatova (RUS)	Milena Baldassarri (ITA)	Linoy Ashram (ISR)
All-Around	Dina Averina (RUS)	Linoy Ashram (ISR)	Aleksandra Soldatova (RUS)
Groups Finals
Group All-Around	Russia; Mariia Kravtsova; Evgeniia Levanova; Ksenia Poliakova; Anastasia Shishmakova; Anastasiia Tatareva; Maria Tolkacheva	Italy; Anna Basta; Martina Centofanti; Letizia Cicconcelli; Agnese Duranti; Alessia Maurelli; Martina Santandrea	Bulgaria; Elena Bineva; Simona Dyankova; Stefani Kiryakova; Madlen Radukanova; Laura Traets
5 hoops	Bulgaria; Elena Bineva; Simona Dyankova; Stefani Kiryakova; Madlen Radukanova; Laura Traets	Japan; Rie Matsubara; Sakura Noshitani; Sayuri Sugimoto; Ayuka Suzuki; Kiko Yokota	Italy; Anna Basta*; Martina Centofanti; Letizia Cicconcelli; Agnese Duranti; Alessia Maurelli; Martina Santandrea
3 balls and 2 ropes	Italy; Anna Basta; Martina Centofanti; Letizia Cicconcelli*; Agnese Duranti; Alessia Maurelli; Martina Santandrea	Russia; Mariia Kravtsova; Evgeniia Levanova; Ksenia Poliakova; Anastasia Shishmakova*; Anastasiia Tatareva; Maria Tolkacheva	Ukraine; Alina Bykhno*; Tetiana Dovzhenko; Valeriya Khanina; Diana Myzherytska; Anastasiya Voznyak; Valeriya Yuzviak

* reserve gymnast

== Medal table ==
Rank	Nation	Gold	Silver	Bronze	Total
1	Russia	7	2	3	12
2	Italy	1	2	3	6
3	Bulgaria	1	1	1	3
4	Israel	0	2	1	3
5	Belarus	0	1	0	1
5	Japan	0	1	0	1
7	Ukraine	0	0	1	1
Totals (7 entries)		9	9	9	27

=== Individual medal table ===
Individual Finals only

Rank	Nation	Gold	Silver	Bronze	Total
1	(Russia) Dina Averina	4	0	0	4
2	(Russia) Aleksandra Soldatova	1	1	1	3
3	(Israel) Linoy Ashram	0	2	1	3
4	(Belarus) Katsiaryna Halkina	0	1	0	1
4	(Italy) Milena Baldassarri	0	1	0	1
6	(Russia) Arina Averina	0	0	2	2
7	(Italy) Alexandra Agiurgiuculese	0	0	1	1
Totals (7 entries)		5	5	5	15

== Individual ==
=== Team ===
The team event took in account the individual qualification results.

Rank	Nation	Hoop (rhythmic gymnastics)	Ball (rhythmic gymnastics)	Clubs (rhythmic gymnastics)	Ribbon (rhythmic gymnastics)	Total
1st place, gold medalist(s)	Russia	60.475	60.450	40.250	33.700	161.325
2nd place, silver medalist(s)	Bulgaria	56.600	56.100	37.950	34.675	150.975
3rd place, bronze medalist(s)	Italy	54.000	54.500	36.500	35.400	147.550
4	Israel	57.350	53.150	34.850	36.050	147.200
5	Ukraine	54.125	53.800	34.900	32.150	145.225
6	Belarus	53.300	53.800	36.200	33.900	143.550
7	United States	53.450	51.800	34.700	33.675	140.925
8	Japan	48.200	49.750	34.450	34.950	140.350
9	Azerbaijan	49.575	49.450	32.675	26.950	131.700
10	Uzbekistan	44.625	48.300	32.850	30.150	130.425
11	Slovenia	45.550	42.600	31.500	32.650	129.600
12	Kazakhstan	50.000	47.725	31.000	29.575	129.500
13	South Korea	47.750	47.350	32.825	30.325	128.175
14	China	48.850	48.250	28.700	30.500	127.950
15	Canada	47.500	48.000	29.500	29.600	125.850
16	Poland	46.600	46.350	28.875	30.650	124.925
17	Spain	43.400	49.350	28.400	27.450	123.250
18	Mexico	46.500	44.350	30.400	27.750	123.100
19	Finland	46.050	43.725	29.900	27.750	121.575
20	Estonia	40.125	46.325	29.700	29.250	121.300
21	Romania	42.350	43.700	29.900	29.075	120.175
22	Hungary	45.400	44.450	25.450	27.625	118.675
23	Brazil	44.250	43.550	29.200	29.450	118.650
24	Portugal	43.550	42.850	28.500	28.600	117.300
25	Egypt	43.000	42.050	29.400	23.950	116.600
26	Austria	42.500	38.900	29.300	25.950	114.900
27	Great Britain	43.250	37.250	26.700	28.450	111.800
28	Malaysia	39.750	44.000	27.250	24.200	111.000
29	Armenia	38.925	40.600	26.750	26.800	110.125
30	Norway	40.900	38.900	26.550	26.325	108.075
31	Lithuania	39.900	38.600	24.200	23.750	103.400
32	Slovakia	36.750	37.300	24.150	22.050	102.500
33	Serbia	35.750	37.200	27.850	22.50	102.300
34	Belgium	35.900	33.050	26.100	21.700	97.500
35	Croatia	30.800	34.400	24.300	21.350	91.350
36	South Africa	32.700	33.350	21.300	16.500	87.700
37	Andorra	29.500	28.100	19.650	20.400	81.350
38	Bosnia and Herzegovina	30.650	28.600	16.100	14.600	75.600

=== Individual Qualification ===
- The top eight scores in individual apparatus qualified for the apparatus finals, and the top twenty-four total scores advanced to the all-around final.
- Only the three best results (bold) are counted in the total score
- Only the two highest ranking gymnasts from each country can qualify to each one of the finals.

Rank	Gymnast	Nation	Hoop (rhythmic gymnastics)	Ball (rhythmic gymnastics)	Clubs (rhythmic gymnastics)	Ribbon (rhythmic gymnastics)	Total
1	Dina Averina	Russia	20.150 (2)	20.150 (2)	20.500 (1)		60.800
2	Aleksandra Soldatova	Russia	20.125 (3)	20.250 (1)		19.900 (1)	60.275
3	Arina Averina	Russia	20.200 (1)	20.050 (3)	19.750 (2)	13.800 (49)	60.000
4	Vlada Nikolchenko	Ukraine	19.850 (5)	18.800 (10)	19.350 (3)	17.950 (5)	58.000
5	Katrin Taseva	Bulgaria	18.850 (8)	19.400 (4)	19.200 (4)	16.550 (13)	57.450
6	Milena Baldassarri	Italy	18.800 (9)	19.250 (6)	18.550 (6)	17.800 (6)	56.600
7	Neviana Vladinova	Bulgaria	18.700 (11)	19.000 (7)	18.750 (5)		56.450
8	Linoy Ashram	Israel	19.950 (4)	17.000 (24)	17.400 (15)	18.550 (2)	55.900
9	Nicol Zelikman	Israel	19.250 (6)	18.950 (8)	17.450 (14)	17.500 (9)	55.700
10	Alexandra Agiurgiuculese	Italy	18.300 (14)	19.300 (5)	17.950 (10)	17.600 (7)	55.550
11	Laura Zeng	United States	18.650 (12)	18.500 (11)	18.200 (9)	16.650 (12)	55.350
12	Boryana Kaleyn	Bulgaria	19.050 (7)	17.700 (15)		18.025 (4)	54.775
13	Katsiaryna Halkina	Belarus	17.400 (23)	18.900 (9)	18.350 (8)	16.400 (15)	54.650
14	Kaho Minagawa	Japan	17.850 (18)	18.400 (12)	17.650 (12)	18.100 (3)	54.350
15	Anastasiia Salos	Belarus	17.250 (26)	17.550 (16)	17.850 (11)	17.500 (8)	52.900
16	Eleni Kelaiditi	Greece	17.600 (20)	18.150 (13)	17.050 (18)	16.050 (18)	52.800
17	Ekaterina Vedeneeva	Slovenia	18.750 (10)	17.450 (17)	16.100 (24)	16.450 (14)	52.650
18	Salome Pazhava	Georgia	16.450 (37)	16.700 (29)	18.400 (7)	13.650 (52)	51.550
19	Chisaki Oiwa	Japan	17.400 (22)	17.300 (19)	16.800 (20)	16.850 (11)	51.550
20	Sabina Tashkenbaeva	Uzbekistan	17.100 (29)	17.100 (23)	17.250 (16)	16.250 (16)	51.450
21	Evita Griskenas	United States	17.300 (25)	16.200 (39)	16.500 (22)	17.025 (10)	50.825
22	Zohra Aghamirova	Azerbaijan	17.900 (17)	17.250 (20)	15.500 (32)	15.150 (29)	50.650
23	Kseniya Moustafaeva	France	18.250 (15)	16.250 (37)	15.950 (27)	15.350 (26)	50.450
24	Alina Adilkhanova	Kazakhstan	17.200 (27)	16.500 (32)	16.600 (21)	15.175 (28)	50.300
25	Yanika Vartlaan	Ukraine	17.375 (24)	16.900 (25)	15.550 (30)		49.825
26	Nicol Ruprecht	Austria	17.150 (28)	15.700 (51)	16.900 (19)	15.600 (23)	49.750
27	Veronika Hudis	Azerbaijan	16.175 (42)	16.400 (33)	17.175 (17)		49.750
28	Yeva Meleshcuhk	Ukraine	16.900 (32)	18.100 (14)		14.200 (41)	49.200
29	Chaewoon Kim	South Korea	15.650 (48)	15.700 (50)	17.575 (13)	14.975 (31)	48.925
30	Goeun Seo	South Korea	17.000 (30)	16.000 (42)	15.250 (35)	15.350 (27)	48.350
31	Rut Castillo Galindo	Mexico	16.450 (36)	15.700 (52)	16.100 (23)	13.100 (60)	48.250
32	Adilya Tlekenova	Kazakhstan	16.800 (33)	16.550 (31)	14.400 (48)	14.400 (39)	47.750
33	Katherine Uchida	Canada	16.150 (43)	16.700 (28)		14.900 (32)	47.750
34	Rebecca Gergalo	Finland	16.700 (34)	15.025 (64)	16.000 (25)	14.100 (44)	47.725
35	Natalia Koziol	Poland	15.550 (50)	15.975 (44)	16.000 (26)	14.900 (33)	47.525
36	Nurinisso Usmanova	Uzbekistan	15.925 (46)	16.000 (43)	15.600 (29)	13.900 (45)	47.525
37	Polina Berezina	Spain	15.550 (51)	16.600 (30)	14.850 (43)	15.350 (25)	47.500
38	Denisa Mailat	Romania	15.600 (49)	16.150 (40)	14.350 (49)	15.650 (22)	47.400
39	Zhao Yating	China	14.650 (69)	16.300 (36)	15.000 (40)	15.850 (19)	47.150
40	Viktoria Bogdanova	Estonia	15.375 (53)	15.725 (49)	15.000 (39)	15.850 (20)	46.950
41	Aleksandra Podgoršek	Slovenia	15.100 (61)	14.150 (83)	15.400 (34)	16.200 (17)	46.700
42	Natalia Kulig	Poland	15.900 (47)	14.675 (71)	12.875 (72)	15.750 (21)	46.325
43	Shang Rong	China	16.350 (39)	15.200 (63)	13.700 (60)	14.650 (36)	46.200
44	Jin A Pak	North Korea	14.900 (63)	16.300 (35)	15.000 (38)	12.950 (63)	46.200
45	Carmen Whelan	Canada	14.850 (65)	15.850 (57)	15.450 (33)	14.700 (34)	46.150
46	Jouki Tikkanen	Finland	16.000 (45)	16.200 (38)	13.900 (58)	13.650 (53)	46.100
47	Sophie Crane	Canada	16.500 (35)	15.450 (56)	14.050 (55)		46.000
48	Natalia Gaudio	Brazil	14.850 (65)	15.400 (57)	13.950 (57)	15.600 (24)	45.550
49	Alina Chamzina	Czech Republic	13.450 (94)	16.400 (34)	15.625 (28)	12.950 (64)	45.475
50	Karla Diaz	Mexico	14.800 (67)	15.850 (46)		14.650 (35)	45.300
51	Andreea Verdes	Romania	14.700 (68)	15.850 (57)	15.550 (31)	13.425 (55)	45.000
52	Laura Sales	Portugal	15.300 (55)	14.900 (66)	14.150 (42)	14.700 (34)	44.950
53	Kamelya Tuncel	Turkey	14.300 (79)	15.300 (59)	15.200 (37)	12.900 (65)	44.800
54	Barbara Domingos	Brazil	15.250 (56)	14.200 (82)	15.250 (36)	13.850 (47)	44.700
55	Margarida Ferreira	Portugal	15.150 (58)	14.850 (68)	13.750 (59)	14.450 (38)	44.450
56	Anastasia Zacrevschi	Moldova	16.200 (41)	14.600 (74)	12.500 (76)	13.600 (54)	44.400
57	Iasmina Agagulian	Armenia	14.600 (72)	14.600 (73)	14.950 (41)	14.300 (40)	44.150
58	Fanni Pigniczki	Hungary	15.350 (54)	14.900 (67)	10.550 (96)	13.825 (48)	44.075
59	Habiba Marzouk	Egypt	14.900 (64)	14.450 (78)	14.700 (45)		44.050
60	Anna Juhasz	Hungary	13.700 (89)	15.000 (65)	14.900 (42)	13.800 (50)	43.700
61	Mariam Selim	Egypt	13.700 (90)	15.250 (60)	14.700 (46)		43.650
62	Sara Llana	Spain	13.250 (97)	16.750 (27)	13.550 (64)	12.100 (73)	43.550
63	Carmen Marii Aesma	Estonia	10.700 (134)	15.350 (58)	14.700 (47)	13.400 (56)	43.450
64	Darya Sorokina	Azerbaijan	15.500 (52)	15.800 (48)		11.800 (78)	43.100
65	Laura Halford	Great Britain	14.850 (66)	13.100 (100)	13.050 (69)	15.150 (30)	43.100
66	Derya Demirors	Turkey	16.400 (38)	14.400 (79)	12.200 (82)	12.050 (74)	43.000
67	Izzah Amzan	Malaysia	12.900 (104)	15.600 (55)	14.150 (52)		42.650
68	Marina Malpica	Mexico	15.250 (56)	12.800 (105)	14.300 (50)		42.350
69	Ana Aponte	Puerto Rico	14.150 (83)	14.475 (76)	9.250 (104)	13.700 (51)	42.325
70	Noemi Peschel	Germany	15.050 (62)	14.450 (77)	12.500 (77)	12.400 (71)	42.000
71	Xenia Kilianova	Slovakia	14.400 (77)	13.650 (90)	12.600 (75)	13.850 (46)	41.900
72	Margit Oeveraas	Norway	14.250 (81)	14.300 (81)		13.250 (59)	41.800
73	Kwan Dict Weng	Malaysia	14.450 (74)	13.750 (88)	13.100 (68)	12.400 (70)	41.300
74	Gemma Frizelle	Great Britain	14.650 (70)	13.350 (95)		13.300 (58)	41.300
75	Giuliana Cusnier	Puerto Rico	13.900 (86)	13.950 (86)	13.000 (70)	13.300 (57)	41.150
76	Alexandra Kiroi-Bogatyreva	Australia	13.100 (101)	13.750 (87)	14.100 (54)	12.850 (66)	40.950
77	Anna-Marie Ondaatje	Sri Lanka	14.275 (80)	13.400 (94)	12.900 (71)	11.150 (83)	40.575
78	Alissa Sadek	Lebanon	13.750 (87)	13.100 (99)	13.600 (62)	11.600 (79)	40.450
79	Alina Baklagina	Latvia	12.500 (110)	13.650 (91)	14.150 (53)	12.500 (68)	40.300
80	Julia Stavickaja	Germany	14.250 (82)	11.500 (122)	11.900 (85)	14.100 (43)	40.250
81	Nastasija Gvozdic	Serbia	11.850 (120)	13.550 (93)	13.600 (63)	13.000 (62)	40.150
82	Anna Stoyanova	Norway	13.650 (91)	12.600 (109)	13.100 (67)	13.075 (61)	39.825
83	Ashari Gill	Australia	13.275 (96)	13.550 (92)	12.000 (83)	12.775 (67)	39.600
84	Sie Yan Koi	Malaysia	12.400 (113)	14.650 (72)		11.800 (76)	38.850
85	Neila Lavrenovaite	Lithuania	14.050 (84)	12.700 (107)		11.950 (75)	38.700
86	Fredrikke Tynning-Bergestuen	Norway	13.000 (102)	12.000 (115)	13.450 (65)		38.450
87	Silva Sargsyan	Armenia	13.175 (98)	12.700 (108)	11.800 (87)	12.500 (69)	38.375
88	Hannah Martin	Great Britain	13.750 (88)	10.800 (136)	13.650 (61)		38.200
89	Andrijana Blazic	Serbia	12.350 (114)	11.500 (124)	14.250 (51)	9.450 (95)	38.100
90	Julija Ivanova	Lithuania	14.350 (78)	11.550 (120)	11.850 (86)	11.800 (77)	38.000

=== Hoop ===
Rank	Gymnast	Nation	D Score	E Score	Pen.	Total
1st place, gold medalist(s)	Dina Averina	Russia	11.700	9.150	0,010	20.850
2nd place, silver medalist(s)	Linoy Ashram	Israel	11.400	8.600		20.000
3rd place, bronze medalist(s)	Arina Averina	Russia	10.700	9.000		19.700
4	Boryana Kaleyn	Bulgaria	11.100	8.500		19.600
5	Nicol Zelikman	Israel	11.000	8.500		19.500
6	Milena Baldassarri	Italy	10.600	8.450		19.050
7	Katrin Taseva	Bulgaria	10.200	8.150		18.350
8	Vlada Nikolchenko	Ukraine	10.200	7.450	-0.600	17.050

=== Ball ===
Rank	Gymnast	Nation	D Score	E Score	Pen.	Total
1st place, gold medalist(s)	Dina Averina	Russia	11.200	9.100		20.300
2nd place, silver medalist(s)	Aleksandra Soldatova	Russia	11.000	9.200		20.200
3rd place, bronze medalist(s)	Alexandra Agiurgiuculese	Italy	11.200	8.700		19.900
4	Milena Baldassarri	Italy	11.000	8.500		19.500
5	Nicol Zelikman	Israel	11.000	8.400		19.400
6	Katsiaryna Halkina	Belarus	10.800	8.400		19.200
7	Neviana Vladinova	Bulgaria	10.700	8.400		19.100
8	Katrin Taseva	Bulgaria	9.900	7.700		17.600

=== Clubs ===
Rank	Gymnast	Nation	D Score	E Score	Pen.	Total
1st place, gold medalist(s)	Dina Averina	Russia	10.800	8.250	-0.050	19.000
2nd place, silver medalist(s)	Katsiaryna Halkina	Belarus	10.000	8.900		18.900
3rd place, bronze medalist(s)	Arina Averina	Russia	10.700	8.150		18.850
4	Milena Baldassarri	Italy	10.600	7.700		18.300
5	Vlada Nikolchenko	Ukraine	10.300	7.800		18.100
6	Neviana Vladinova	Bulgaria	9.700	7.950		17.650
7	Salome Pazhava	Georgia	9.300	8.100		17.400
8	Katrin Taseva	Bulgaria	9.700	7.500		17.200

=== Ribbon ===
Rank	Gymnast	Nation	D Score	E Score	Pen.	Total
1st place, gold medalist(s)	Aleksandra Soldatova	Russia	9.300	9.300		18.600
2nd place, silver medalist(s)	Milena Baldassarri	Italy	9.900	8.650		18.550
3rd place, bronze medalist(s)	Linoy Ashram	Israel	9.700	8.800		18.500
4	Alexandra Agiurgiuculese	Italy	8.650	8.800		17.450
5	Anastasiia Salos	Belarus	8.800	8.400		17.200
6	Boryana Kaleyn	Bulgaria	8.900	8.200		17.100
7	Vlada Nikolchenko	Ukraine	8.600	7.450		16.050
8	Kaho Minagawa	Japan	6.300	5.000	-0.700	10.600

=== All-Around ===
Rank	Gymnast	Nation	Hoop (rhythmic gymnastics)	Ball (rhythmic gymnastics)	Clubs (rhythmic gymnastics)	Ribbon (rhythmic gymnastics)	Total
1st place, gold medalist(s)	Dina Averina	Russia	21.000 (2)	20.650	20.800	19.000	81.450
2nd place, silver medalist(s)	Linoy Ashram	Israel	20.400	19.750	20.650	18.900	79.700
3rd place, bronze medalist(s)	Aleksandra Soldatova	Russia	21.275 (1)	20.400	20.450	17.050	79.175
4	Vlada Nikolchenko	Ukraine	19.150	19.150	19.350	16.900	74.550
5	Katsiaryna Halkina	Belarus	18.200	18.900	18.675	18.500	74.275
6	Katrin Taseva	Bulgaria	18.800	19.700	17.600	17.850	73.950
7	Milena Baldassarri	Italy	19.200	17.800	18.150	18.250	73.400
8	Laura Zeng	United States	19.450	18.400	18.050	17.450	73.350
9	Alexandra Agiurgiuculese	Italy	17.950	19.650	18.325	17.300	73.225
10	Anastasiia Salos	Belarus	19.050	18.400	18.200	16.650	72.300
11	Nicol Zelikman	Israel	17.275	18.500	18.950	17.100	71.825
12	Kaho Minagawa	Japan	18.450	18.300	17.250	16.950	70.950
13	Ekaterina Vedeneeva	Slovenia	18.250	17.800	17.550	16.700	70.300
14	Eleni Kelaiditi	Greece	18.000	18.250	18.400	15.300	69.950
15	Neviana Vladinova	Bulgaria	19.350	18.500	14.900	16.600	69.350
16	Sabina Tashkenbaeva	Uzbekistan	17.000	17.400	17.150	16.250	67.800
17	Evita Griskenas	United States	16.300	16.800	17.300	16.550	66.950
18	Kseniya Moustafaeva	France	17.900	15.300	17.000	16.650	66.850
19	Alina Adilkhanova	Kazakhstan	16.975	16.700	16.200	16.300	66.175
20	Nicol Ruprecht	Austria	17.200	16.800	16.250	15.450	65.700
21	Salome Pazhava	Georgia	18.050	15.050	17.450	14.850	65.400
22	Yanika Vartlaan	Ukraine	17.700	17.000	15.100	13.900	63.700
23	Chisaki Oiwa	Japan	14.200	17.200	17.250	14.800	63.450
24	Zohra Aghamirova	Azerbaijan	16.650	16.600	14.500	15.650	63.400

== Groups ==
=== Squads ===
Team	Australia (AUS)	Austria (AUT)	Azerbaijan (AZE)	Belarus (BLR)	Brazil (BRA)	Bulgaria (BUL)
Members	Alannah Mathews; Himeka Onoda; Nikita Rosendahl; Alexandra Teixeira; Felicity White	Franziska Herzog (Note: Only competed in 3 Balls + 2 Ropes); Lisa Hofmann; Florentina Marchart; Leona Marchart (Note: Only competed in 5 Hoops); Romana Nagler	Ayshan Bayramova; Diana Doman; Zeynab Hummatova; Aliya Pashayeva; Siyana Vasileva	Hanna Haidukevich; Lalita Matskevich; Dziyana Misiuchenka; Anastasiya Rybakova; Hanna Shvaiba	Vitoria Guerra; Jessica Maier; Gabrielle Moraes; Nicole Pircio; Karine Walter; Gabriela Ribeiro	Elena Bineva; Simona Dyankova; Stefani Kiryakova; Madlen Radukanova; Laura Traets
Team	Canada (CAN)	China (CHN)	Czech Republic (CZE)	Egypt (EGY)	Spain (ESP)	Estonia (EST)
Members	Elizabet Belittchenko; Vanessa Panov; Anastasia Shanko; Alexandra Udachina; Alexandra Zilyuk	Ding Ziyi; Hu Yuhui; Huang Zhangjiayang; Liu Xin; Xu Yanshu	Gabriela Fiedlerova; Andrea Kozova; Daniela Nemeckova; Daniela Peslova; Adela Plchova; Johana Marie Vondrakova	Sara Ahmed; Nadine Aziz; Malak Hussein; Farida Kafafi; Nour Mazar; Marla Philips	Monica Alonso; Victoria Cuadrillero; Clara Esquerdo; Ana Gayán; Alba Polo; Sara Salarrullana	Helena Jaee; Visilina Kuksova; Carmely Reiska; Maria Susi; Lera Teino; Maria Trofimov
Team	Finland (FIN)	France (FRA)	Georgia (GEO)	Germany (GER)	Greece (GRE)	Hungary (HUN)
Members	Elisa Liinavuori; Milja Naerevaara; Ada Oikari; Emma Rantala; Juulia Vainio; Amanda Virkkunen	Danae Collard; Helene Deconninck; Iliona Prioux; Astrid Rabette; Elisabeth Rachid; Chloe Sivadier	Natela Bolataeva; Irina Kakabadze; Tamar Kheladze; Mariam Kupunia; Natalia Tabagari; Salome Urushadze	Viktoria Burjak; Daniela Huber; Nathalie Koehn; Anni Qu; Alexandra Tikhonovich; Sina Tkaltschewitsch	Chrysanthi Athanasakopoulou; Myrto Athanasoulaki; Chrysi Moutafi; Zoi Ntitsiou; Avra Ntouro; Ioanna Anna Tziatzia	Zsofia Arkai; Patricia Borsanyi; Cintia Vivien Foeldi; Jazmin Kovacs; Virag Nemeth; Vivien Wehovszky
Team	India (IND)	Israel (ISR)	Italy (ITA)	Japan (JPN)	Kazakhstan (KAZ)	South Korea (KOR)
Members	Nirja Chavan; Divya Dave; Radhika Dharap; Disha Nidre; Janhavi Vartak	Shai Ben Ruby; Ofir Dayan; Natalie Raits; Bar Shapochnikov; Eli Toledo; Karin Vexman	Anna Basta; Martina Centofanti; Letizia Cicconcelli; Agnese Duranti; Alessia Maurelli; Martina Santandrea	Rie Matsubara; Sakura Noshitani; Sayuri Sugimoto; Ayuka Suzuki; Kiko Yokota	Jessika Budnik; Zhanerke Dauletkulova; Aiza Rustamkyzy; Regina Sultanova; Anel Talgatbek; Dayana Zhakupova	Baek Sujin; Hwang Seoyoung; Kim Chaeyul; Kim Min; Kim Minju; Yang Hyun-jin
Team	Mexico (MEX)	New Zealand (NZL)	POL (POL)	North Korea (PRK)	Russia (RUS)	Slovenia (SLO)
Members	Mildred Maldonado; Marcela Quijano; Sara Ruiz; Brittany Sainz; Karen Villanueva	Paige Grant Huggett; Izabella Jurlina; Hannah Kelly; Fleur Lyons; Katherine Paton; Abbey Retter	Julia Chochol; Alicja Guja; Aleksandra Majewska; Agata Malisiewicz; Michalina Nicpon; Aleksandra Wlazlak	Kang Jin-a; Pak Un-gyong; Ri Hye-song; Ryang Yong-mi; Sim Ye-gyong; Sin Su-rim	Mariia Kravtsova; Evgeniia Levanova; Ksenia Poliakova; Anastasia Shishmakova; Anastasiia Tatareva; Maria Tolkacheva	Masa Bizjak; Zoja Marija Ivancic; Ana Kragulj; Sara Kragulj; Neža Kopitar; Lara Nemes
Team	Serbia (SRB)	Switzerland (SUI)	Turkey (TUR)	Ukraine (UKR)	United States (USA)	Uzbekistan (UZB)
Members	Iva Andric; Teodora Jakovljevic; Lana Radovic; Una Radovic; Marija Stefanovic; Nada Vlahovic	Tania Cardinale; Gina Duenser; Jasmin Frieden; Tamara Stanisic; Julia Wymann	Duygu Dogan; Basak Nida Karaevli; Aleksandra Mitrovich; Emiliya Radicheva; Ipek Vardar	Alina Bykhno; Tetiana Dovzhenko; Valeriya Khanina; Diana Myzherytska; Anastasiya Voznyak; Valeriya Yuzviak	Daria Baltovick; Isabelle Connor; Ugne Dragunas; Connie Du; Elizaveta Pletneva; Nicole Sladkov	Kseniia Aleksandrova; Kamola Irnazarova; Safiyabonu Kasimova; Sinara Ravshanbekova; Sevara Safoeva; Nilufar Shomuradova

=== Group All-Around ===
The top eight scores in each apparatus qualified for the group apparatus finals. The top twenty-four groups in the all-around qualified for the 2019 World Championships in Baku, and the top three groups automatically qualified for the 2020 Olympic Games.

Place	Nation	5	2 + 3	Total
1st place, gold medalist(s)	Russia	23.250 (1)	23.050 (1)	46.300
2nd place, silver medalist(s)	Italy	22.775 (2)	22.050 (3)	44.825
3rd place, bronze medalist(s)	Bulgaria	19.700 (6)	22.350 (2)	42.050
4	Ukraine	19.900 (4)	21.250 (4)	41.150
5	Japan	19.750 (5)	20.900 (5)	40.650
6	Belarus	20.000 (3)	19.200 (7)	39.200
7	Azerbaijan	19.200 (7)	19.900 (6)	39.100
8	France	18.700 (8)	18.350 (12)	37.050
9	Mexico	18.300 (11)	18.650 (9)	36.950
10	Finland	18.650 (9)	18.100 (15)	36.750
11	China	17.550 (15)	18.550 (10)	36.100
12	Germany	18.550 (10)	17.450 (16)	36.000
13	Estonia	17.600 (14)	18.275 (13)	35.875
14	United States	17.300 (19)	18.500 (11)	35.800
15	Israel	17.550 (17)	18.100 (14)	35.650
16	Poland	18.100 (12)	16.800 (20)	34.900
17	Uzbekistan	17.500 (18)	17.200 (17)	34.700
18	Brazil	16.800 (21)	16.975 (18)	33.775
19	Hungary	18.000 (13)	15.700 (22)	33.700
20	Spain	14.450 (29)	19.150 (8)	33.600
21	North Korea	17.550 (16)	15.450 (24)	33.000
22	Greece	17.300 (20)	15.000 (27)	32.300
23	Canada	16.700 (22)	15.550 (23)	32.250
24	Kazakhstan	15.050 (26)	16.800 (19)	31.850
25	Switzerland	15.350 (24)	16.200 (21)	31.550
26	Egypt	15.450 (23)	15.050 (26)	30.500
27	Slovenia	14.500 (28)	14.650 (29)	29.150
28	Czech Republic	14.000 (30)	15.150 (25)	29.150
29	Australia	14.725 (27)	14.200 (30)	28.925
30	Turkey	15.250 (25)	13.650 (32)	28.900
31	South Korea	13.850 (31)	14.775 (28)	28.625
32	Austria	13.400 (32)	13.850 (31)	27.250
33	Georgia	10.700 (34)	11.900 (33)	22.600
34	New Zealand	11.700 (33)	10.150 (35)	21.850
35	Serbia	10.200 (35)	11.550 (34)	21.750
36	India	8.000 (36)	8.450 (36)	16.450

=== 5 Hoops ===
Rank	Nation	E Score	D Score	Pen.	Total
1st place, gold medalist(s)	Bulgaria	8.600	14.700		23.300
2nd place, silver medalist(s)	Japan	8.200	14.600		22.800
3rd place, bronze medalist(s)	Italy	8.450	14.100		22.550
4	Russia	6.825	13.500		20.325
5	Azerbaijan	6.700	13.400		20.100
6	France	7.500	12.200		19.700
7	Ukraine	7.000	12.800	-0.30	19.500
8	Belarus	6.500	12.400	-0.30	18.600

=== 3 Balls + 2 Ropes ===
Rank	Nation	E Score	D Score	Pen.	Total
1st place, gold medalist(s)	Italy	8.750	13.800		22.550
2nd place, silver medalist(s)	Russia	8.500	13.700		22.200
3rd place, bronze medalist(s)	Ukraine	7.800	13.600		21.400
4	Japan	8.150	13.200		21.350
5	Belarus	7.750	13.200		20.950
6	Bulgaria	7.350	13.400		20.750
7	Azerbaijan	7.600	12.800		20.400
8	Spain	7.400	12.400		19.800
