= Tornatore =

Tornatore is a surname. Notable people with the surname include:

- Beatrice Tornatore (born 1999), Italian group rhythmic gymnast
- Giuseppe Tornatore (born 1956), Italian film director and screenwriter
