= Alina Chamzina =

Czech rhythmic gymnast (born 2002)

- Born: 30 April 2002 (age 24) Brno, Czech Republic

Gymnastics career
- Discipline: Rhythmic gymnastics
- Country represented: Czech Republic; (2015–2019)
- Club: SK Tart Moravská Slavia Brno
- Head coach: Zdena Schinzelová
- Retired: yes

Alina Chamzina (born 30 April 2002) is a former Czech rhythmic gymnast. She represented the Czech Republic from 2014 to 2020.

== Personal life ==
Chamzina took up the sport at age four. Her idols are Evgeniya Kanaeva, Alina Kabaeva and Maria Titova. In 2018 she was named best rhythmic gymnast of Czech Republic.

== Career ==
In the years 2014–2019, she won 6 times the title of champion of the Czech Republic in individuals, and 4 titles of the champion of the Czech Republic in groups.

Internationally she debuted at the 2015 European Championships in Minsk, where she was a member of the junior group, finishing 15th in the All-Around. The following year she competed at the European Championships in Holon as an individual being 24th in teams, 55th with rope, 38th with hoop, 28th with ball and 19th with clubs.

In 2018 she became a senior, participating in the World Cup in Sofia where she was 27th in the All-Around, 43rd with hoop, 20th with ball, 19th with clubs and 34th with ribbon. In Tashkent she was 16th in the All-Around, 17th with hoop, 14th with ball, 18th with clubs and 17th with ribbon. A week later in Baku she took 21st place in the All-Around, 22nd with hoop, 21st with ball, 22nd with clubs and 21st with ribbon. She was then selected for the World Championships in Sofia along Sabina Zálešáková and the senior group, finishing 49th in the All-Around, 94th with hoop, 34th with ball, 28th with clubs and 64th with ribbon.

Alina started 2019 by taking part in the World Cup in Sofia being 53rd in the All-Around, 52nd with hoop, 33rd with ball, 64th with clubs and 38th with ribbon. She ended 27th in the All-Around, 31st with hoop, 23rd with ball, 25th with clubs and 27th with ribbon in Tashkent. At the European Championships in Baku she was 20th in the All-Around, 22nd with hoop, 21st with ball, 26th with clubs and 32nd with ribbon. At the World Cup in Minsk she was 34th in the All-Around, 44th with hoop, 28th with ball, 25th with clubs and 31st with ribbon. She then competed at the World Championships in Baku along Zálešáková, she finished 52nd in the All-Around, 58th with hoop, 47th with ball, 63rd with clubs and 75th with ribbon, thus missing the Olympic qualification quota.

In addition she represented the Czech Republic and the SK TART MS Brno Club at the AEON Cup in Tokyo from 2015 to 2018, in 2016 she was 3rd in qualification.
