= Mariia Kravtsova =

Russian rhythmic gymnast (born 2000)

- Full name: Mariia Ivanovna Kravtsova
- Born: 19 September 2000 (age 25) Omsk, Russia

Gymnastics career
- Discipline: Rhythmic gymnastics
- Country represented: Russia (2016)
- Gym: Novogorsk
- Head coach: Irina Viner
- Assistant coach: Tatiana Sergaeva
Medal record
Group rhythmic gymnastics
Representing Russia
World Championships
Gold medal – first place	2017 Pesaro	Group All-around
Gold medal – first place	2017 Pesaro	3 Balls + 2 Ropes
Gold medal – first place	2018 Sofia	Group All-around
Silver medal – second place	2017 Pesaro	5 Hoops
Silver medal – second place	2018 Sofia	3 Balls + 2 Ropes
European Championships
Gold medal – first place	2018 Guadalajara	Team
Gold medal – first place	2018 Guadalajara	Group All-around
Bronze medal – third place	2018 Guadalajara	5 Hoops
Junior European Championships
Gold medal – first place	2015 Minsk	Group All-around
Silver medal – second place	2015 Minsk	5 Balls

Mariia Ivanovna Kravtsova (Russian: Мария Ивановна Кравцова); born 19 September 2000) is a retired Russian group rhythmic gymnast. She is a two-time (2017, 2018) European Group All-around champion and the 2015 European Junior Group All-around champion. She retired in 2018.

== Career ==
She took up rhythmic gymnastics at age 3 in her hometown Omsk.

Kravtsova was selected to represent Russia alongside Ekaterina Fedorova, Anastasia Kalabina, Angelina Shkatova and Ksenia Polyakova at the 2015 Junior European Championships in Minsk, Belarus. They won gold medal in Group all-around and silver in 5 Balls final.
