= Daniela Mogurean =

Moldovan Italian rhythmic gymnast

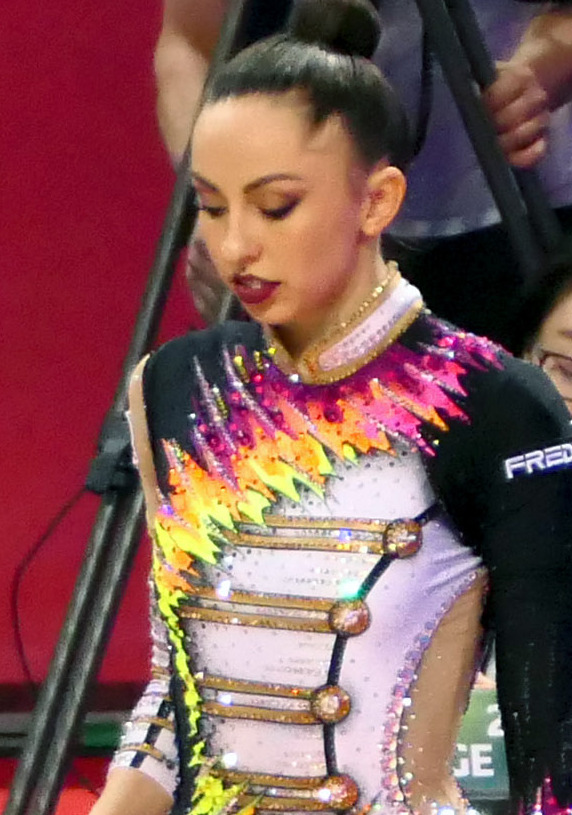
- Mogurean in 2024

Personal information
- Nickname: Dana
- Born: 16 July 2001 (age 25) Chișinău, Moldova
- Height: 167 cm (5 ft 6 in)

Gymnastics career
- Discipline: Rhythmic gymnastics
- Country represented: Italy (2015-2024)
- Former countries represented: Moldova
- Club: Ginnastica Ritmica Padova
- Head coach: Emanuela Maccarani
- Choreographer: Federica Bagnera
- Retired: 2025
Medal record
Rhythmic Gymnastics
Representing Italy
Olympic Games
Bronze medal – third place	2020 Tokyo	Group All-around
Bronze medal – third place	2024 Paris	Group All-around
World Championships
Gold medal – first place	2021 Kitakyushu	3 Hoops + 4 Clubs
Gold medal – first place	2022 Sofia	Team
Gold medal – first place	2022 Sofia	5 Hoops
Silver medal – second place	2021 Kitakyushu	Team
Silver medal – second place	2021 Kitakyushu	Group All-around
Silver medal – second place	2021 Kitakyushu	5 Balls
Silver medal – second place	2022 Sofia	3 Ribbons + 2 Balls
Bronze medal – third place	2023 Valencia	Team
Bronze medal – third place	2023 Valencia	5 Hoops
European Championships
Gold medal – first place	2022 Tel Aviv	5 Hoops
Gold medal – first place	2022 Tel Aviv	3 Ribbons + 2 Balls
Gold medal – first place	2024 Budapest	5 Hoops
Silver medal – second place	2021 Varna	Group All-around
Silver medal – second place	2022 Tel Aviv	Group All-around
Silver medal – second place	2022 Tel Aviv	Team
Silver medal – second place	2024 Budapest	Team
Silver medal – second place	2024 Budapest	Group All-around
Bronze medal – third place	2021 Varna	3 Hoops + 4 Clubs
Bronze medal – third place	2023 Baku	5 Hoops
European Cup
Silver medal – second place	2024 Baku	Group All-around
Silver medal – second place	2024 Baku	5 Hoops
Silver medal – second place	2024 Baku	3 Ribbons + 2 Balls

Daniela Mogurean (born 16 July 2001) is a Moldovan-Italian rhythmic gymnast that represents Italy. She won Olympic bronze medals with the Italian group at the 2020 and 2024 Summer Olympics. She is a 2021 World champion in 3 hoops and 4 clubs and a 2022 World champion in 5 hoops. She also won two gold medals at the 2022 European Championships and one gold medal at the 2024 European Championships.

== Early life ==
Mogurean was born on 16 July 2001 in Chișinău, Moldova, and grew up in Tighina. She started rhythmic gymnastics at the age of four after following her older sister into the sport. The family moved to Mestre, Italy, when she was eight years old. She continued her rhythmic gymnastics training in Italy.

== Gymnastics career ==
The International Gymnastics Federation approved Mogurean's nationality change request to represent Italy internationally in February 2015. She joined the Italian junior national group and competed at the 2015 European Junior Championships, where they finished sixth in the group all-around and fifth in the 5 balls final.

=== 2021 ===
Mogurean was a reserve for Italy's senior national group for four years before being added to the main team in 2021. She helped the Italian group sweep the silver medals, all behind Bulgaria, at the Baku World Cup. Then at the Pesaro World Cup, they won gold medals in both event finals ahead of Russia. She competed at the 2021 European Championships in Varna, Bulgaria, and won a silver medal in the group all-around and a bronze medal in the 3 hoops and 4 clubs final. She then represented Italy at the 2020 Summer Olympics alongside Agnese Duranti, Alessia Maurelli, Martina Centofanti, and Martina Santandrea. They qualified for the group all-around final in third place, and they won the bronze medal in the final.

Mogurean and the Italian group then competed at the 2021 World Championships. They won the silver medal in the group all-around behind Russia. In the event finals, they won the gold medal in 3 hoops and 4 clubs and the silver medal in 5 balls. Additionally, the Italian group and individuals Alexandra Agiurgiuculese, Milena Baldassarri, and Sofia Raffaeli won the silver medal in the team competition.

=== 2022 ===
Mogurean and the Italian group won two gold medals and one silver medal at the Baku World Cup. They then swept the gold medals at both the Pamplona World Challenge Cup and at the Pesaro World Cup. At the 2022 European Championships, they won a silver medal in the group all-around behind Israel. They then won the gold medals in both event finals. They missed out on a group all-around medal and an Olympic berth at the 2022 World Championships due to mistakes, but the Italian team of the group, Milena Baldassarri, and Sofia Raffaeli won the team competition. In the event finals, they improved their performance to win the gold medal in 5 hoops and the silver medal behind Bulgaria in 3 ribbons and 2 balls.

=== 2023 ===
Mogurean helped the Italian group win a gold medal in 3 ribbons and 2 balls at the Athens World Cup. At the Milan World Cup, they won the all-around title after winning a tie-breaker over Israel. They then lost to Israel in the 5 hoops final but won the 3 ribbons and 2 balls final. They then won the bronze medal in 5 hoops at the European Championships. At the 2023 World Championships, the Italian group finished fourth in the all-around after multiple mistakes in their 3 ribbons and 2 balls routine. However, they did qualify for the 2024 Summer Olympics as they were among the top five eligible groups. They did qualify for the 5 hoops final and won the bronze medal behind China and Spain. Additionally, they won a bronze medal in the team event.

=== 2024 ===
Mogurean helped the Italian group sweep the gold medals at the Athens World Cup. They then swept the silver medals at the first-ever European Cup. Then at the European Championships, they won the gold medal in 5 hoops. Additionally, they won silver medals in the group all-around and team events. She competed at the 2024 Summer Olympics alongside Alessia Maurelli, Agnese Duranti, Martina Centofanti, and Laura Paris. The group won the second-consecutive bronze medal in the group all-around final, behind China and Israel.

Daniela announced her retirement from competitive gymnastics on May 4, 2025, in an Instagram post.

== Detailed Olympic results ==
Year	Competition Description	Location	Music	Apparatus	Rank	Score-Final	Rank	Score-Qualifying
2020	Olympics	Tokyo		All-around	3rd	87.700	3rd	87.150
2020	Olympics	Tokyo	Butterfly-Ninja by Maxime Rodriguez	5 Balls	4th	44.850	3rd	44.600
2020	Olympics	Tokyo	Tree of Life Suite by R. Cacciapaglia, Royal Philharmonic Orchestra	3 Hoops + 4 Clubs	3rd	42.850	4th	42.550
2024	Olympics	Paris		All-around	3rd	68.100	2nd	69.350
2024	Olympics	Paris	Scherzo Molto Vivace from Symphony No. 9, Greatness by Audiomachine, Vo Williams	5 Hoops	3rd	36.100	2nd	38.200
2024	Olympics	Paris	The Ecstasy of Gold by Ennio Morricone, Czech National Symphony Orchestra	3 Ribbons + 2 Balls	4th	32.000	6th	31.150

== See also ==
- Nationality changes in gymnastics
