= Gymnastics at the 2019 European Games =

- Venue: Minsk-Arena
- Dates: 22–30 June
- Competitors: 273 from 37 nations

Gymnastics competitions at the 2019 European Games in Minsk, Belarus, were held from 22 to 30 June 2019 at the Minsk-Arena. A total of 32 gymnastics events were held in the five disciplines; artistic, rhythmic, trampolining, aerobic and acrobatic.

== Qualification ==
A total of 286 athletes will qualify for the gymnastics competitions. Qualification will be based on the results from the World Championships or European Championships in each discipline.

=== Timeline ===
Event	Date	Venue
2018 European Trampoline Championships	12–15 April 2018	(Azerbaijan) Baku
2018 Acrobatic Gymnastics World Championships	13–15 April 2018	(Belgium) Antwerp
2018 Aerobic Gymnastics World Championships	1–3 June 2018	(Portugal) Guimarães
2018 European Rhythmic Gymnastics Championships	1–3 June 2018	(Spain) Guadalajara
2018 European Artistic Gymnastics Championships	2–12 August 2018	(United Kingdom) Glasgow
2019 European Artistic Gymnastics Championships	10–14 April 2019	(Poland) Szczecin

=== Summary ===
Nation	Acrobatic		Aerobic		Artistic		Rhythmic		Trampoline		Total
Nation	Pairs	Groups	Pairs	Groups	Men	Women	Individual	Group	Men	Women	Total
Armenia					3						3
Austria						1	1				2
Azerbaijan	2				1	1	1	5	2		12
Belarus	2	3	X	5	3	2	1	5	2	2	25
Belgium		3			1	2					6
Bulgaria			X	5	1	1	1	5	1	2	16
Croatia					1						1
Cyprus					1						1
Czech Republic				5		2			1	1	9
Denmark									1		1
Estonia								5			5
Finland					2						2
France	2	3			3	3			2	2	15
Georgia							1		1	2	4
Great Britain		3		5	3	2			1	1	15
Greece					1	1	1		1	1	5
Hungary			2		2	3	1				8
Iceland					1	1					2
Ireland					1	1					2
Israel		3			3	1	1				8
Italy			X	5	3		1	5	1	1	16
Latvia						1					1
Lithuania					1						1
Luxembourg						1					1
Netherlands	2	3				2				2	9
Norway					1						1
Poland					1	1			2		4
Portugal		3	2			1			2	2	10
Romania			X	5		1	1				7
Russia	2		2	5	3	3	1	5	2	2	25
Slovakia					1	1					2
Slovenia						3					3
Spain	2		1	5	3	1		5		1	18
Sweden						1			2	1	4
Switzerland					2					1	3
Turkey					3	1			1		5
Ukraine	2	3			3	3	1	5	2	2	21
37 NOCs	14	24	47		48	41	12	40	24	23	273

== Medal table ==
* Host nation (Belarus)

Rank	Nation	Gold	Silver	Bronze	Total
1	Russia	11	6	5	22
2	Belarus*	6	1	9	16
3	Belgium	3	1	0	4
4	Ukraine	2	5	7	14
5	Israel	2	2	0	4
6	Italy	2	0	0	2
7	France	1	1	1	3
8	Armenia	1	1	0	2
9	Finland	1	0	0	1
9	Lithuania	1	0	0	1
9	Poland	1	0	0	1
9	Slovenia	1	0	0	1
13	Bulgaria	0	4	2	6
14	Portugal	0	2	2	4
15	Azerbaijan	0	2	1	3
16	Great Britain	0	2	0	2
17	Romania	0	1	1	2
17	Turkey	0	1	1	2
19	Cyprus	0	1	0	1
19	Czech Republic	0	1	0	1
19	Georgia	0	1	0	1
22	Hungary	0	0	2	2
23	Sweden	0	0	1	1
Totals (23 entries)		32	32	32	96

== Medal summary ==
=== Acrobatic ===
Women's groups

Event	Gold	Silver	Bronze
All-around	Belgium; Talia De Troyer; Britt Vanderdonckt; Charlotte Van Royen	Portugal; Francisca Maia; Francisca Sampaio Maia; Bárbara da Silva Sequeira	Belarus; Veranika Nabokina; Julia Ivonchyk; Karina Sandovich
Balance	Belarus; Veranika Nabokina; Julia Ivonchyk; Karina Sandovich	Belgium; Talia De Troyer; Britt Vanderdonckt; Charlotte Van Royen	Portugal; Francisca Maia; Francisca Sampaio Maia; Bárbara da Silva Sequeira
Dynamic	Belgium; Talia De Troyer; Britt Vanderdonckt; Charlotte Van Royen	Portugal; Francisca Maia; Francisca Sampaio Maia; Bárbara da Silva Sequeira	Belarus; Veranika Nabokina; Julia Ivonchyk; Karina Sandovich

Mixed pairs

Event	Gold	Silver	Bronze
All-around	Russia; Kirill Startsev; Victora Aksenova	Azerbaijan; Abdulla Al-Mashaykhi; Ruhidil Gurbanli	Belarus; Artur Beliakou; Volha Melnik
Balance	Belarus; Artur Beliakou; Volha Melnik	Russia; Kirill Startsev; Victora Aksenova	Azerbaijan; Abdulla Al-Mashaykhi; Ruhidil Gurbanli
Dynamic	Russia; Kirill Startsev; Victora Aksenova	Azerbaijan; Abdulla Al-Mashaykhi; Ruhidil Gurbanli	Belarus; Artur Beliakou; Volha Melnik

=== Aerobic ===
Event	Gold	Silver	Bronze
Mixed pairs	Italy; Davide Donati; Michela Castoldi	Romania; Dacian Barna; Andreea Bogati	Russia; Grigorii Shikhaleev; Tatyana Konakova
Mixed group	Russia; Garsevan Dzhanazian; Timur Kulaev; Ilia Ostapenko; Petr Perminov; Roman Semenov	Bulgaria; Tihomir Barotev; Ivelina Lukaki; Antonio Papazov; Darina Pashova; Ana Maria Stoilova	Romania; Dacian Barna; Gabriel Bocşer; Andreea Bogati; Marian Broţei; Mihai Popa

=== Artistic ===
Men's individual

Event	Gold	Silver	Bronze
All-around	David Belyavskiy; Russia	Oleg Verniaiev; Ukraine	Vladislav Polyashov; Russia
Floor	Emil Soravuo; Finland	Giarnni Regini-Moran; Great Britain	Petro Pakhniuk; Ukraine
Pommel horse	David Belyavskiy; Russia	Oleg Verniaiev; Ukraine	Andrey Likhovitskiy; Belarus
Rings	Marco Lodadio; Italy	Vahagn Davtyan; Armenia	Igor Radivilov; Ukraine
Vault	Artur Davtyan; Armenia	Dmitriy Lankin; Russia	Igor Radivilov; Ukraine
Parallel bars	Oleg Verniaiev; Ukraine	Marios Georgiou; Cyprus	Ferhat Arıcan; Turkey
Horizontal bar	Robert Tvorogal; Lithuania	Ahmet Önder; Turkey	Dávid Vecsernyés; Hungary

Women's individual

Event	Gold	Silver	Bronze
All-around	Angelina Melnikova; Russia	Lorette Charpy; France	Diana Varinska; Ukraine
Vault	Teja Belak; Slovenia	Angelina Melnikova; Russia	Sára Péter; Hungary
Uneven bars	Angelina Melnikova; Russia	Becky Downie; Great Britain	Anastasiya Alistratava; Belarus
Balance beam	Nina Derwael; Belgium	Angelina Melnikova; Russia	Diana Varinska; Ukraine
Floor	Anastasia Bachynska; Ukraine	Aneta Holasová; Czech Republic	Jessica Castles; Sweden

=== Rhythmic ===
Women's individual

Event	Gold	Silver	Bronze
All-around	Dina Averina; Russia	Linoy Ashram; Israel	Katsiaryna Halkina; Belarus
Hoop	Dina Averina; Russia	Katsiaryna Halkina; Belarus	Vlada Nikolchenko; Ukraine
Ball	Linoy Ashram; Israel	Katrin Taseva; Bulgaria	Dina Averina; Russia
Clubs	Linoy Ashram; Israel	Dina Averina; Russia	Vlada Nikolchenko; Ukraine
Ribbon	Dina Averina; Russia	Linoy Ashram; Israel	Katrin Taseva; Bulgaria

Women's group

Event	Gold	Silver	Bronze
All-around	Belarus; Hanna Haidukevich; Anastasiya Rybakova; Hanna Shvaiba; Arina Tsitsilina; Karyna Yarmolenka	Bulgaria; Simona Dyankova; Stefani Kiryakova; Madlen Radukanova; Erika Zafirova; Laura Traets	Russia; Vera Biryukova; Anastasia Maksimova; Anastasia Shishmakova; Anzhelika Stubailo; Maria Tolkacheva
5 balls	Russia; Vera Biryukova; Anastasia Maksimova; Anastasia Shishmakova; Anzhelika Stubailo; Maria Tolkacheva	Bulgaria; Simona Dyankova; Stefani Kiryakova; Madlen Radukanova; Erika Zafirova; Laura Traets	Belarus; Hanna Haidukevich; Anastasiya Rybakova; Hanna Shvaiba; Arina Tsitsilina; Karyna Yarmolenka
3 hoops and 4 clubs	Belarus; Hanna Haidukevich; Anastasiya Rybakova; Hanna Shvaiba; Arina Tsitsilina; Karyna Yarmolenka	Ukraine; Alina Bykhno; Tetiana Dovzhenko; Diana Myzherytska; Anastasiya Voznyak; Valeriya Yuzviak	Bulgaria; Simona Dyankova; Stefani Kiryakova; Madlen Radukanova; Erika Zafirova; Laura Traets

=== Trampoline ===
Event	Gold	Silver	Bronze
Men's individual	Uladzislau Hancharou; Belarus	Mikhail Melnik; Russia	Diogo Ganchinho; Portugal
Men's synchronized	Poland; Łukasz Jaworski; Artur Zakrzewski	Ukraine; Anton Davydenko; Mykola Prostorov	France; Sébastien Martiny; Allan Morante
Women's individual	Léa Labrousse; France	Luba Golovina; Georgia	Hanna Hancharova; Belarus
Women's synchronized	Belarus; Hanna Hancharova; Maryia Makharynskaya	Ukraine; Maryna Kyiko; Svitlana Malkova	Russia; Irina Kundius; Yana Pavlova
