= Vera Biryukova =

Russian rhythmic gymnast (born 1998)

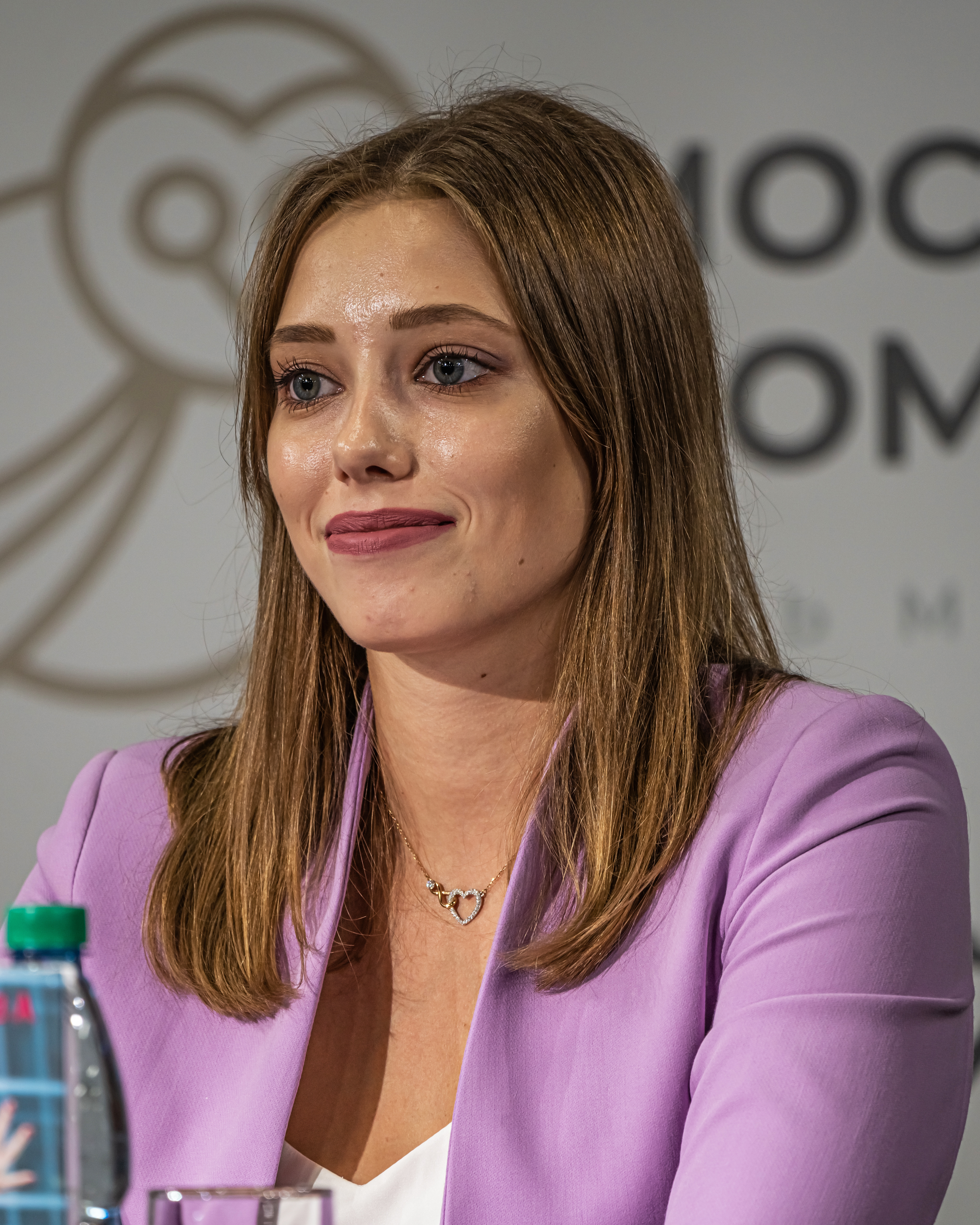
- Vera Biryukova in 2021

Personal information
- Full name: Vera Leonidovna Biryukova
- Alternative name: Vera Biriukova
- Born: 11 April 1998 (age 28) Omsk, Omsk Oblast, Russia
- Height: 168 cm (5 ft 6 in)

Gymnastics career
- Country represented: Russia; (Since 2013)
- Club: OMSK Centre of Gymnastics
- Gym: Novogorsk
- Head coach: Tatiana Sergaeva
- Assistant coach: Vera Shtelbaums
- Former coach: Natalia Glemba
- Choreographer: Elena Arais
Medal record
Rhythmic Gymnastics
Representing Russia
Summer Olympics
Gold medal – first place	2016 Rio de Janeiro	Group all-around
European Games
Gold medal – first place	2019 Minsk	5 Balls
Bronze medal – third place	2019 Minsk	Group all-around
Summer Universiade
Gold medal – first place	2017 Taipei	Group 5 hoops
Gold medal – first place	2017 Taipei	Group 3 balls/2 ropes
Bronze medal – third place	2017 Taipei	Group all-around

Vera Leonidovna Biryukova (Russian: Вера Леонидовна Бирюкова; born 11 April 1998) is a Russian group rhythmic gymnast who was the 2016 Olympics Group all-around champion.

== Career ==
Biryukova was born in Omsk. She began gymnastics at five years old under the encouragement of her mother, Vera Shtelbaums. Her first coach was Natalia Glemba.

Biryukova was briefly included as part of Russia's group, but was later relegated to the reserve team. In 2016 Biryukova returned as a member of the Russian national group, replacing Ksenia Poliakova. She competed with the Russian group at the 2016 World Cup series in Kazan and Baku.

On August 19–21, Biryukova was a member of the gold-winning Russian group (with Anastasia Maksimova, Maria Tolkacheva, Anastasia Bliznyuk, Anastasiia Tatareva) that won gold at the 2016 Summer Olympics held in Rio de Janeiro, Brazil.

== Awards ==
- Honored Master of Sports of Russia (2016).
- Order of Friendship (August 25, 2016) - for outstanding sports achievements at the Games XXXI Olympiad in 2016 in the city of Rio de Janeiro (Brazil), manifested the will to win and sense of purpose.

== Detailed Olympic results ==
Year	Competition Description	Location	Music	Apparatus	Rank	Score-Final	Rank	Score-Qualifying
2016	Olympics	Rio de Janeiro		All-around	1st	36.233	2nd	35.516
2016	Olympics	Rio de Janeiro	L'adoration De La Terre, Le Sacrifice - Danse Sacrale, Time, Forward! Igor Stravinsky, Moscow New Choir, Elena Rastvora, Russian Philharmonic Symphony Orchestra & Alexander Vedernikov	6 Clubs / 2 Hoops	1st	18.633	6th	17.233
2016	Olympics	Rio de Janeiro	Samba do Brasil, Those Were The Days by Bellini, Gruppa Na-Na	5 Ribbons	3rd	17.600	1st	18.283
