= Kobets =

Kobets (Cyrillic: Кобец) is an East Slavic surname. Notable people with the surname include:

- Alyaksandr Kobets (born 1981), Belarusian footballer
- Daria Kobets (born 2000), Ukrainian rhythmic gymnast
- Konstantin Kobets (1939–2012), Russian army general
- Oleksandr Kobets (born 1959), Ukrainian politician and businessman
