= Agnese Duranti =

Italian rhythmic gymnast (born 2000)

- Full name: Agnese Duranti
- Born: 18 December 2000 (age 25)
- Height: 172 cm (5 ft 8 in)

Gymnastics career
- Discipline: Rhythmic gymnastics
- Country represented: Italy (2015-2024)
- Club: Polisportiva La Fenice
- Head coach: Emanuela Maccarani
- Choreographer: Federica Bagnera
- Retired: yes
Medal record
Group Rhythmic Gymnastics
Olympic Games
Representing Italy
Olympic Games
Bronze medal – third place	2020 Tokyo	Group All-around
Bronze medal – third place	2024 Paris	Group All-around
World Championships
Gold medal – first place	2017 Pesaro	5 Hoops
Gold medal – first place	2018 Sofia	3 Balls + 2 Ropes
Gold medal – first place	2021 Kitakyushu	3 Hoops + 4 Clubs
Gold medal – first place	2022 Sofia	Team
Gold medal – first place	2022 Sofia	5 Hoops
Silver medal – second place	2018 Sofia	Group All-around
Silver medal – second place	2021 Kitakyushu	Team
Silver medal – second place	2021 Kitakyushu	Group All-around
Silver medal – second place	2021 Kitakyushu	5 Balls
Silver medal – second place	2022 Sofia	3 Ribbons + 2 Balls
Bronze medal – third place	2018 Sofia	5 Hoops
Bronze medal – third place	2019 Baku	3 Hoops + 4 Clubs
Bronze medal – third place	2023 Valencia	Team
Bronze medal – third place	2023 Valencia	5 Hoops
European Championships
Gold medal – first place	2018 Guadalajara	5 Hoops
Gold medal – first place	2022 Tel Aviv	5 Hoops
Gold medal – first place	2022 Tel Aviv	3 Ribbons + 2 Balls
Gold medal – first place	2024 Budapest	5 Hoops
Silver medal – second place	2018 Guadalajara	Group All-around
Silver medal – second place	2018 Guadalajara	3 Balls + 2 Ropes
Silver medal – second place	2021 Varna	Group All-around
Silver medal – second place	2022 Tel Aviv	Group All-around
Silver medal – second place	2022 Tel Aviv	Team
Silver medal – second place	2024 Budapest	Team
Silver medal – second place	2024 Budapest	Group All-around
Bronze medal – third place	2021 Varna	3 Hoops + 4 Clubs
Bronze medal – third place	2023 Baku	5 Hoops
European Cup
Silver medal – second place	2024 Baku	All-around
Silver medal – second place	2024 Baku	5 Hoops
Silver medal – second place	2024 Baku	3 Ribbons + 2 Balls

Agnese Duranti (born 18 December 2000) is an Italian group rhythmic gymnast. She was a member of the national squad from 2015 to 2024. She is a two-time (2020, 2024) Olympic Group All-around bronze medalist, a two-time (2018, 2021) World Group All-around silver medalist and four-time European (2018, 2021, 2022, 2024) Group All-around silver medalist.

== Career ==
She took up rhythmic gymnastics in 2009 at age nine at the Polisportiva La Fenice club in Spoleto, Italy.

=== Junior ===
She first appeared in Italian National team in 2015, when she was a member of a junior group which competed at the 2015 European Junior Championships and placed 6th in Group All-around and 5th in 5 Balls Final.

=== Senior ===
At the 2017 World Championships in Pesaro, Italy she became World champion in 5 Hoops, missing the podium with the Italian group in the Group All-around competition, finishing in 4th place, just 0.025 points behind Japan.

Together with Anna Basta, Martina Centofanti, Letizia Cicconcelli, Alessia Maurelli and Martina Santandrea she participated at the 2018 European Championships in Guadalajara, Spain, where they won a gold medal in 5 Hoops and two silver medals in the Group All-around and in 3 Balls + 2 Ropes final. Another notable performance followed at the 2018 World Championships in Sofia, Bulgaria, with the title won in the mixed exercise with Balls and Ropes, in addition to the second place in the Group All-around, and finally the third place in 5 Hoops final. With placing in top 3 in Group All-around, they earned a spot for Italian team at the 2020 Olympic Games.

In 2019, they won bronze medal at the 2019 World Championships in Baku, Azerbaijan in 3 Hoops + 4 Clubs final. They finished 5th in Group All-around and 6th in 5 Balls final.

In 2021, the first official post-pandemic competition was World Cup Baku, about 18 months after the last competition, where they won three silver medals (Group All-around, 5 Balls, 3 Hoops + 4 Clubs). Subsequently, at the World Cup in Pesaro, they won 2 gold medals in both apparatus finals. In particular, the score obtained in the 5 Balls final, 46.950, is the highest score ever recorded in the history of rhythmic gymnastics up to that moment. At the European Championships in Varna, Bulgaria, she and her teammates won silver in the Group All-around behind the Russian team, earning the title of European vice-champion again. They also won bronze medal in 3 Hoops + 4 Clubs final. She took part in the 2020 Summer Olympics in Tokyo, Japan that year, together with her teammates Martina Centofanti, Alessia Maurelli, Martina Santandrea and Daniela Mogurean. They won a bronze medal, in Women's rhythmic Group All-around.

She won a bronze medal, in Women's rhythmic group all-around, at the 2024 Summer Olympics in Paris, France. She is one of four Italian rhythmic gymnasts to participate at three editions of Olympic Games.

On December 19 that year, after winning bronze at Olympics, she announced her retirement from competitive sport on her Instagram profile.

== Detailed Olympic results ==
Year	Competition Description	Location	Music	Apparatus	Rank	Score-Final	Rank	Score-Qualifying
2020	Olympics	Tokyo		All-around	3rd	87.700	3rd	87.150
2020	Olympics	Tokyo	Butterfly-Ninja by Maxime Rodriguez	5 Balls	4th	44.850	3rd	44.600
2020	Olympics	Tokyo	Tree of Life Suite by R. Cacciapaglia, Royal Philharmonic Orchestra	3 Hoops + 4 Clubs	3rd	42.850	4th	42.550
