= Alessia Maurelli =

Italian rhythmic gymnast (born 1996)

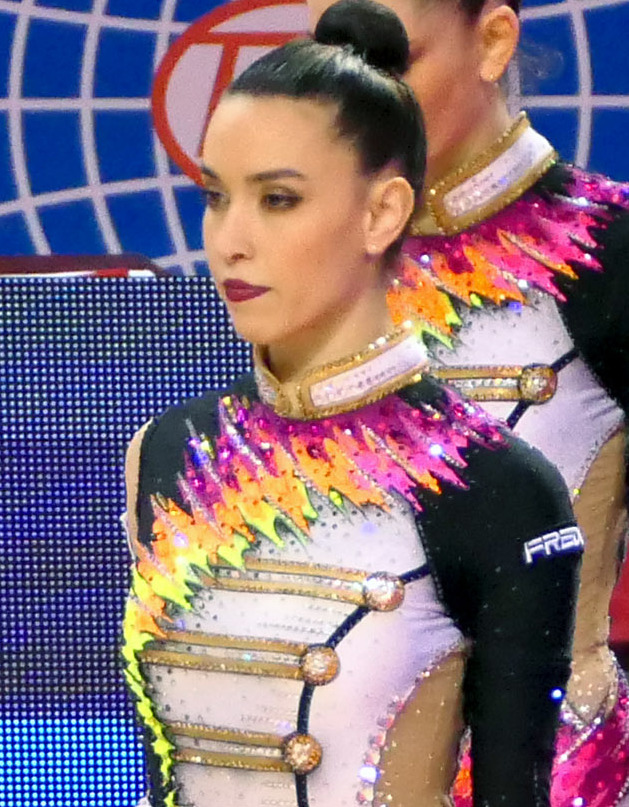
- Maurelli in 2024

Personal information
- Full name: Alessia Maurelli
- Born: 22 August 1996 (age 30)
- Height: 1.70 m (5 ft 7 in)

Gymnastics career
- Discipline: Rhythmic gymnastics
- Country represented: Italy (2014–2024)
- Club: Aeronautica Militare
- Head coach: Emanuela Maccarani
- Choreographer: Federica Bagnera
Medal record
Group Rhythmic Gymnastics
Olympic Games
Representing Italy
Olympic Games
Bronze medal – third place	2020 Tokyo	Group All-around
Bronze medal – third place	2024 Paris	Group all-around
World Championships
Gold medal – first place	2015 Stuttgart	5 Ribbons
Gold medal – first place	2017 Pesaro	5 Hoops
Gold medal – first place	2018 Sofia	3 Balls + 2 Ropes
Gold medal – first place	2021 Kitakyushu	3 Hoops + 4 Clubs
Gold medal – first place	2022 Sofia	Team
Gold medal – first place	2022 Sofia	5 Hoops
Silver medal – second place	2014 İzmir	Group All-around
Silver medal – second place	2015 Stuttgart	6 Clubs + 2 Hoops
Silver medal – second place	2018 Sofia	Group All-around
Silver medal – second place	2021 Kitakyushu	Team
Silver medal – second place	2021 Kitakyushu	Group All-around
Silver medal – second place	2021 Kitakyushu	5 Balls
Silver medal – second place	2022 Sofia	3 Ribbons + 2 Balls
Bronze medal – third place	2018 Sofia	5 Hoops
Bronze medal – third place	2019 Baku	3 Hoops + 4 Clubs
Bronze medal – third place	2023 Valencia	Team
Bronze medal – third place	2023 Valencia	5 Hoops
European Championships
Gold medal – first place	2018 Guadalajara	5 Hoops
Gold medal – first place	2022 Tel Aviv	5 Hoops
Gold medal – first place	2022 Tel Aviv	3 Ribbons + 2 Balls
Gold medal – first place	2024 Budapest	5 Hoops
Silver medal – second place	2014 Baku	Group All-around
Silver medal – second place	2018 Guadalajara	Group All-around
Silver medal – second place	2018 Guadalajara	3 Balls + 2 Ropes
Silver medal – second place	2021 Varna	Group All-around
Silver medal – second place	2022 Tel Aviv	Group All-around
Silver medal – second place	2022 Tel Aviv	Team
Silver medal – second place	2024 Budapest	Team
Silver medal – second place	2024 Budapest	Group All-around
Bronze medal – third place	2021 Varna	3 Hoops + 4 Clubs
Bronze medal – third place	2023 Baku	5 Hoops

Alessia Maurelli (born 22 August 1996) is a former Italian group rhythmic gymnast. She is a two-time (2020, 2024) Olympic Group All-around bronze medalist, a three-time (2014, 2018, 2021) World Group All-around silver medalist and five-time European (2014, 2018, 2021, 2022, 2024) Group All-around silver medalist.

A member of the national squad since 2014, Maurelli ascended to prominence on the international scene at the 2016 Summer Olympics, where she and fellow rhythmic gymnasts Sofia Lodi, Camilla Patriarca, Marta Pagnini, and Martina Centofanti attained a total score of 35.549 on the combination of hoops, ribbons, and clubs for the fourth spot in the final, slipping her team off the podium (and the second place) by nearly two tenths of a point.

== Career ==
She started practicing rhythmic gymnastics at age 9 in Associazione Ginnastica Estense O. Putinati.

=== 2016 Olympic Cycle ===
In January 2014 she was recognized by Emanuela Maccarani, who invited her to be part of the National Rhythmic Gymnastics team of Italy. She then moved to Desio and made her international debut at the 2014 European Championships in Baku, Azerbaijan, where she and her team took silver medal in Group All-around competition. They also won bronze medal in Group All-around and 3 + 2 Final at the 2014 World Cup Sofia. On September 21–28, she competed at the 2014 World Championships, her first one, which took place in İzmir, Turkey. Her team took silver medal in Group All-around, less than 0.2 point away from gold, was won by Bulgaria. In finals, they placed 5th with 10 Clubs and 4th with 3 Balls + 2 Ribbons.

In 2015, she and her team mates took gold in 5 Ribbons final at the 2015 World Championships in Stuttgart, Germany.

She and her team mates, Martina Centofanti, Sofia Lodi, Marta Pagnini and Camilla Patriarca placed 4th in Group All-around at the 2016 Summer Olympics. In September 2016, with the retirement of Marta Pagnini, Maurelli became the captain of the Italian National Rhythmic Gymnastics Team.

=== 2020 Olympic cycle ===
At the 2017 World Championships in Pesaro, Italy she became World champion in 5 Hoops, missing the podium with the Italian group in the Group All-around competition, finishing in 4th place, just 0.025 points behind Japan.

Together with Anna Basta, Martina Centofanti, Letizia Cicconcelli, Agnese Duranti and Martina Santandrea she participated at the 2018 European Championships in Guadalajara, Spain, where they won a gold medal in 5 Hoops and two silver medals in the Group All-around and in 3 Balls + 2 Ropes final. Another notable performance followed at the 2018 World Championships in Sofia, Bulgaria, with the title won in the mixed exercise with Balls and Ropes, in addition to the second place in the Group All-around, and finally the third place in 5 Hoops final. With placing in top 3 in Group All-around, they earned a spot for Italian team at the 2020 Olympic Games.

In 2019, they won bronze medal at the 2019 World Championships in Baku, Azerbaijan in 3 Hoops + 4 Clubs final. They finished 5th in Group All-around and 6th in 5 Balls final.

In 2021, the first official post-pandemic competition was World Cup Baku, about 18 months after the last competition, where they won three silver medals (Group All-around, 5 Balls, 3 Hoops + 4 Clubs). Subsequently, at the World Cup in Pesaro, they won 2 gold medals in both apparatus finals. In particular, the score obtained in the 5 Balls final, 46.950, is the highest score ever recorded in the history of rhythmic gymnastics up to that moment. At the European Championships in Varna, Bulgaria, she and her teammates won silver in the Group All-around behind the Russian team, earning the title of European vice-champion again. They also won bronze medal in 3 Hoops + 4 Clubs final. She took part in the 2020 Summer Olympics in Tokyo, Japan that year, together with her teammates Martina Centofanti, Agnese Duranti, Martina Santandrea and Daniela Mogurean. They won a bronze medal, in Women's rhythmic Group All-around.

=== 2024 Olympic cycle ===
In 2022, she helped the Italian group win two gold medals and one silver medal at Baku World Cup. They then swept the gold medals at the Pamplona World Challenge Cup and at the Pesaro World Cup. At the 2022 European Championships in Tel Aviv, Israel, they won a silver medal in the group all-around behind Israel. They then won the gold medals in both event finals. They missed out on a group all-around medal and an Olympic berth at the 2022 World Championships in Sofia, Bulgaria, due to mistakes, but the Italian team of the group, Milena Baldassarri, and Sofia Raffaeli won the team competition. In the event finals, they won the gold medal in 5 hoops and the silver medal behind Bulgaria in 3 ribbons and 2 balls.

In 2023, they won a gold medal in 3 ribbons and 2 balls at the Athens World Cup. At the Milan World Cup, they then won the all-around title after winning a tie-breaker over Israel. They then lost to Israel in the 5 hoops final but won 3 ribbons and 2 balls. They won the bronze medal in 5 hoops at the 2023 European Championships in Baku, Azerbaijan. In August, at the 2023 World Championships in Valencia, Spain, the Italian group finished 4th in the all-around after multiple mistakes in the 3 ribbons and 2 balls routine. However, they did qualify for the 2024 Summer Olympics as they were among the top five eligible groups. They qualified for the 5 hoops final and won the bronze medal behind China and Spain in addition to winning a team bronze medal.

Maurelli helped the Italian group sweep the gold medals at the Athens World Cup. They then swept the silver medals at the European Cup. Then at the 2024 European Championships in Budapest, Hungary, the Italian group won the title in 5 hoops. Additionally, they won silver medals in the group all-around and team events. Maurelli competed at the 2024 Summer Olympics in Paris, France, alongside Martina Centofanti, Agnese Duranti, Daniela Mogurean, and Laura Paris. The group won the bronze medal in the group all-around final, behind China and Israel. She is one of four Italian rhythmic gymnasts to participate at three editions of Olympic Games. On December 17, she announced on her Instagram profile that she retires from competitive sport at the age of 28.

== Personal life ==
Alessia is originally from Venaria Reale but born in Rivoli. She moved with her family at the age of 5 to Santa Maria Maddalena, a hamlet in the municipality of Occhiobello, Polesine. Since 2015, she has competed as a member of the Centro Sportivo Aeronautica Militare. In 2022, she published her debut novel, Vola come una Farfalla (Fly Like a Butterfly), followed in 2023 by its sequel, Graffia come una Tigre (Scratch Like a Tiger).

Since 2022 she has been dating an actor Massimo Bertelloni, who proposed to her on August 10, after the awarding ceremony of the 2024 Olympic Group All-around final in Paris. Couple got married on June 11, in 2026.

== Achievements ==
- Oldest Italian gymnast in the history of rhythmic gymnastics to participate (and to win a medal) in an edition of the Olympic Games (27 years, 11 months and 19 days).
- Participated in three consecutive editions of the Olympic Games (Rio 2016, Tokyo 2021, Paris 2024). Record shared with Martina Centofanti, Elisa Blanchi and Elisa Santoni.

== Detailed Olympic results ==
Year	Competition Description	Location	Music	Apparatus	Rank	Score-Final	Rank	Score-Qualifying
2016	Olympics	Rio de Janeiro		All-around	4th	35.549	4th	35.349
2016	Olympics	Rio de Janeiro	Tu Si Na Cosa Grande, Tammurriata, Nessun Dorma by Massimo Ranieri, Unknown, Luciano Pavarotti	5 Ribbons	4th	17.516	5th	17.516
2016	Olympics	Rio de Janeiro	Faust: VII. Danse de Phryne. Allegretto vivo Herbert von Karajan	6 Clubs / 2 Hoops	3rd	18.033	3rd	17.833
2020	Olympics	Tokyo		All-around	3rd	87.700	3rd	87.150
2020	Olympics	Tokyo	Butterfly-Ninja by Maxime Rodriguez	5 Balls	4th	44.850	3rd	44.600
2020	Olympics	Tokyo	Tree of Life Suite by R. Cacciapaglia, Royal Philharmonic Orchestra	3 Hoops + 4 Clubs	3rd	42.850	4th	42.550
2024	Olympics	Paris		All-around	3rd	68.100	2nd	69.350
2024	Olympics	Paris	Scherzo Molto Vivace from Symphony No. 9, Greatness by Audiomachine, Vo Williams	5 Hoops	3rd	36.100	2nd	38.200
2024	Olympics	Paris	The Ecstasy of Gold' by Ennio Morricone, Czech National Symphony Orchestra	3 Ribbons + 2 Balls	4th	32.000	6th	31.150
