= Diana Myzherytska =

Ukrainian rhythmic gymnast

- Height: 1.74 m (5 ft 9 in)

Gymnastics career
- Discipline: Rhythmic gymnastics
- Country represented: Ukraine
- Club: Deriugina School
- Head coach: Irina Deriugina
Medal record
World Championships
Bronze medal – third place	2018 Sofia	3 Balls + 2 Ropes
European Games
Silver medal – second place	2019 Minsk	3 Hoops and 4 Clubs
European Championships
Silver medal – second place	2018 Guadalajara	Team
Silver medal – second place	2018 Guadalajara	5 Hoops

Diana Myzherytska (Ukrainian: Діана Олександрівна Мижерицька) is a Ukrainian female rhythmic gymnast. She has been a member of Ukrainian rhythmic gymnastics national team since 2017. At the 2018 Rhythmic Gymnastics European Championships in Guadalajara, she won two silver medals in team events.
