= Valeriya Yuzviak =

Ukrainian rhythmic gymnast (born 1999)

- Born: 20 August 1999 (age 27)
- Height: 1.71 m (5 ft 7 in)

Gymnastics career
- Discipline: Rhythmic gymnastics
- Country represented: Ukraine
- Club: Deriugina School
- Head coach: Irina Deriugina
- Retired: yes
Medal record
World Championships
Bronze medal – third place	2018 Sofia	3 Balls + 2 Ropes
European Games
Silver medal – second place	2019 Minsk	3 Hoops + 4 Clubs
European Championships
Gold medal – first place	2020 Kyiv	Team
Gold medal – first place	2020 Kyiv	5 Balls
Silver medal – second place	2020 Kyiv	3 Hoops + 4 Clubs
Silver medal – second place	2018 Guadalajara	Team
Silver medal – second place	2018 Guadalajara	5 Hoops
Bronze medal – third place	2020 Kyiv	Group All-Around

Valeriya Yuzviak (Ukrainian: Валерія Вадимівна Юзьвяк, born 1999) is a retired Ukrainian female rhythmic gymnast. She was member of Ukrainian rhythmic gymnastics national team since 2016. At the 2018 Rhythmic Gymnastics European Championships in Guadalajara she won two silver medals in team events.
