= Anastasia Shishmakova =

Russian rhythmic gymnast (born 2000)

- Full name: Anastasia Olegovna Shishmakova
- Nickname: Nastya
- Born: 22 February 2000 (age 26) Seversk, Russia
- Height: 176 cm (5 ft 9 in)

Gymnastics career
- Discipline: Rhythmic gymnastics
- Country represented: Russia
- Club: CSKA Moscow
- Gym: Novogorsk
- Head coach: Irina Viner
Medal record
Representing Russia
Group Rhythmic Gymnastics
World Championships
Gold medal – first place	2018 Sofia	Group All-around
Gold medal – first place	2019 Baku	Group All-around
Gold medal – first place	2019 Baku	3 Hoops + 4 Clubs
Silver medal – second place	2018 Sofia	3 Balls + 2 Ropes
Bronze medal – third place	2019 Baku	5 Balls
European Games
Gold medal – first place	2019 Minsk	5 Balls
Bronze medal – third place	2019 Minsk	Group All-around
European Championships
Gold medal – first place	2018 Guadalajara	Team
Gold medal – first place	2018 Guadalajara	Group All-around
Bronze medal – third place	2018 Guadalajara	5 Hoops

Anastasia Olegovna Shishmakova (Russian: Анастасия Олеговна Шишмакова; born 22 February 2000) is a Russian former group rhythmic gymnast. She is a two-time (2018, 2019) World group all-around champion and the 2018 European group all-around champion.

== Career ==
Shishmakova took up rhythmic gymnastics at the age of seven in her hometown of Seversk after previously training in artistic gymnastics. She joined the Russian national group as a reserve in 2017 and moved up to the main group in 2018.

At the 2018 European Championships, Shishmakova won gold medals in the team event and in the group all-around. She competed with the Russian group that lost the all-around competition to Italy at the Minsk World Challenge Cup. They also lost to Italy due to a tie-breaker at the Kazan World Challenge Cup. At the 2018 World Championships, Shishmakova and the Russian group won the all-around title, and they won the silver medal in the 3 balls and 2 ropes final.

Shishmakova helped Russia win the group all-around at the 2019 Pesaro World Cup. She missed the 2019 Holon Grand Prix due to a hand injury, but she returned in time for the 2019 European Games. There, Russia won the bronze medal in the group all-around behind Belarus and Bulgaria after making mistakes in the 3 hoops and 4 clubs routine. They did win the gold medal with their 5 balls routine. At the 2019 Kazan World Challenge Cup, she helped the Russian group win the all-around competition ahead of Bulgaria. She helped Russia successfully defend its group all-around title. They won the 3 hoops and 4 clubs apparatus final but dropped to the bronze medal in the 5 balls final.
