= Daria Kobets =

Ukrainian rhythmic gymnast (born 2000)

- Born: 2000 (age 25–26)
- Height: 1.63 m (5 ft 4 in)

Gymnastics career
- Discipline: Rhythmic gymnastics
- Country represented: Ukraine
- Club: Deriugina School
- Head coach: Irina Deriugina
Medal record
European Championships
Silver medal – second place	2018 Guadalajara	Team
Silver medal – second place	2018 Guadalajara	5 Hoops

Daria Kobets (Ukrainian: Дарія Кобець, born 2000) is a Ukrainian female rhythmic gymnast. She is member of Ukrainian rhythmic gymnastics national team since 2017. At the 2018 Rhythmic Gymnastics European Championships in Guadalajara she won two silver medals in team events.
