= Hanna Shvaiba =

Belarusian rhythmic gymnast (born 2000)

- Full name: Hanna Shvaiba
- Born: 14 March 2000 (age 26) Minsk, Belarus

Gymnastics career
- Discipline: Rhythmic gymnastics
- Country represented: Belarus (2017-)
- Club: Rhythmic Gymnastics; Republican Centre of Olympic Preparation
- Head coach: Tatiana Nenasheva
- Assistant coach: Irina Leparskaya
- Choreographer: Volha Strakhava
Medal record
Representing Belarus
Group rhythmic gymnastics
European Games
Gold medal – first place	2019 Minsk	Group all-around
Gold medal – first place	2019 Minsk	3 Hoops + 4 Clubs
Bronze medal – third place	2019 Minsk	5 Balls
European Championships
Silver medal – second place	2021 Varna	Team
Junior European Championships
Gold medal – first place	2015 Minsk	5 Balls
Silver medal – second place	2015 Minsk	Group All-around

Hanna Shvaiba (Belarusian: Ганна Швайба; born on 14 March 2000) is a Belarusian female rhythmic gymnast.

== Career ==
=== Junior ===
She was a part of Belarusian junior group that competed at the 2015 European Junior Championships and won silver medal in the Group All-around and gold in 5 Balls.
