= 2018 Rhythmic Gymnastics European Championships =

- Venue: Palacio Multiusos de Guadalajara
- Location: Guadalajara, Spain
- Start date: 1 June 2018
- End date: 3 June 2018
- Competitors: 231 from 40 nations

The 2018 Rhythmic Gymnastics European Championships was the 34th edition of the Rhythmic Gymnastics European Championships, which took place on 1–3 June 2018 at the Palacio Multiusos de Guadalajara in Guadalajara, Spain.

== Participating countries ==
- Andorra
- Armenia
- Austria
- Azerbaijan
- Belarus
- Belgium
- Bosnia and Herzegovina
- Bulgaria
- Croatia
- Cyprus
- Czech Republic
- Denmark
- Estonia
- Finland
- France
- Georgia
- Germany
- Greece
- Hungary
- Israel
- Italy
- Latvia
- Lithuania
- Macedonia
- Moldova
- Montenegro
- Norway
- Poland
- Portugal
- Romania
- Russia
- San Marino
- Serbia
- Slovakia
- Slovenia
- Spain
- Switzerland
- Sweden
- Turkey
- Ukraine

== Competition schedule ==
- Friday June 1
  - 10:30–12:40 CI juniors individual hoop and ball Set A
  - 12:50–15:00 CI seniors individual hoop and ball Set B
  - 15:45–17:55 CI seniors individual hoop and ball Set C
  - 18:00–18:30 Opening Ceremony
  - 18:30–20:00 CI senior groups 5 hoops
- Saturday June 2
  - 09:00–10:25 CII juniors individual clubs and ribbon Set A1
  - 10:35–12:00 CII juniors individual clubs and ribbon Set A2
  - 12:10–13:25 CII senior groups and junior individual Set A
  - 13:30–14:30 CII senior groups and junior individual Set B
  - 15:15–16:15 CII senior groups and junior individual Set C
  - 16:20–17:20 CII senior groups and junior individual Set D
  - 17:25–18:25 CII senior groups and junior individual Set E
  - 18:30 Award Ceremony – Team Competition
  - 18:30 Award Ceremony – Senior groups all around
- Sunday June 3
  - 10:00–11:00 CIII Apparatus finals juniors hoop and ball
  - 11:10–12:10 CIII Apparatus finals juniors clubs and ribbon
  - 12:15–12:30 Award Ceremony – Hoop-Ball-Clubs-Ribbon
  - 12:30–13:10 CIII senior groups finals 5 hoops
  - 13:15–13:55 CIII senior groups finals 3 balls and 2 ropes
  - 14:00–14:15 Award Ceremony – 5 hoops
  - 14:00–14:15 Award Ceremony – 3 balls and 2 ropes
  - 15:00–17:00 CII senior individuals Set B
  - 17:10–19:10 CII senior individuals Set A
  - 19:15–19:30 Award Ceremony – Senior individuals
  - 19:40–20:00 Closing Ceremony

== Medal winners ==
Event	Gold	Silver	Bronze
Team
Team	Russia; Junior Individual; Anastasiia Sergeeva; Polina Shmatko; Lala Kramarenko; Daria Trubnikova; Senior Group; Anastasia Bliznyuk; Mariia Kravtsova; Ksenia Poliakova; Anastasiia Tatareva; Maria Tolkacheva; Anastasia Shishmakova	Ukraine; Junior Individual; Khrystyna Pohranychna; Viktoriia Onopriienko; Senior Group; Anastasiya Voznyak; Valeriya Yuzviak; Valeriya Khanina; Daria Kobets; Alina Bykhno; Diana Myzherytska	Bulgaria; Junior Individual; Tatyana Volozhanina; Anna Kelman; Elizabet Yovcheva; Senior Group; Elena Bineva; Madlen Radukanova; Simona Dyankova; Laura Traets; Stefani Kiryakova
Senior Individual Finals
All-around	Arina Averina; Russia	Dina Averina; Russia	Katsiaryna Halkina; Belarus
Senior Group Finals
All-around	Russia; Anastasia Bliznyuk; Mariia Kravtsova; Ksenia Poliakova; Anastasiia Tatareva; Maria Tolkacheva; Anastasia Shishmakova	Italy; Alessia Maurelli; Martina Centofanti; Agnese Duranti; Martina Santandrea; Letizia Cicconcelli; Anna Basta	Bulgaria; Elena Bineva; Madlen Radukanova; Simona Dyankova; Laura Traets; Stefani Kiryakova
5 Hoops	Italy; Alessia Maurelli; Martina Centofanti; Agnese Duranti; Martina Santandrea; Letizia Cicconcelli; Anna Basta	Ukraine; Anastasiya Voznyak; Valeriya Yuzviak; Valeriya Khanina; Daria Kobets; Alina Bykhno; Diana Myzherytska	Russia; Anastasia Bliznyuk; Mariia Kravtsova; Ksenia Poliakova; Anastasiia Tatareva; Maria Tolkacheva; Anastasia Shishmakova
3 Balls + 2 Ropes	Bulgaria; Elena Bineva; Madlen Radukanova; Simona Dyankova; Laura Traets; Stefani Kiryakova	Italy; Alessia Maurelli; Martina Centofanti; Agnese Duranti; Martina Santandrea; Letizia Cicconcelli; Anna Basta	Azerbaijan; Ayshan Bayramova; Siyana Vasileva; Diana Doman; Zeynab Hummatova; Aliya Pashayeva
Junior Finals
Hoop	Polina Shmatko; Russia	Tatyana Volozhanina; Bulgaria	Khrystyna Pohranychna; Ukraine
Ball	Lala Kramarenko; Russia	Khrystyna Pohranychna; Ukraine	Arzu Jalilova; Azerbaijan
Clubs	Daria Trubnikova; Russia	Anna Kamenshchikova; Belarus	Valeriia Sotskova; Israel
Ribbon	Lala Kramarenko; Russia	Khrystyna Pohranychna; Ukraine	Talisa Torretti; Italy

== Results ==
=== Team ===
Rank	Nation	Hoop (rhythmic gymnastics)	Ball (rhythmic gymnastics)	Clubs (rhythmic gymnastics)	Ribbon (rhythmic gymnastics)	5	3, 2	Total
1st place, gold medalist(s)	Russia	17.350	36.650	18.650	35.150	22.500	21.125	151.425
2nd place, silver medalist(s)	Ukraine	17.600	33.575	34.225	15.850	21.050	18.700	141.000
3rd place, bronze medalist(s)	Bulgaria	33.325	16.000	17.025	32.500	23.100	18.650	140.600
4	Italy	32.750	31.250	15.550	15.650	21.800	21.100	138.100
5	Belarus	–	32.650	34.250	32.050	18.750	17.400	135.100
6	Azerbaijan	30.775	33.200	15.700	15.050	17.200	18.500	130.425
7	Spain	31.400	31.500	14.700	14.500	19.200	17.850	129.150
8	France	30.750	13.900	28.850	14.900	17.100	16.675	122.175
9	Estonia	29.050	28.950	15.250	13.700	18.150	16.600	121.700
10	Israel	–	31.450	31.250	30.750	11.500	16.550	121.500
11	Latvia	29.850	27.950	28.600	–	15.700	13.650	115.750
12	Poland	27.200	13.600	27.200	13.350	17.900	15.650	114.900
13	Hungary	27.650	27.275	13.650	13.100	16.200	15.700	113.575
14	Finland	25.850	14.700	12.625	24.700	17.550	17.150	112.575
15	Slovenia	26.250	28.150	14.700	13.050	15.100	13.100	110.350
16	Greece	26.725	13.000	28.250	12.900	14.150	11.000	106.025
17	Norway	26.100	–	24.000	22.650	10.750	8.250	91.750
18	Austria	21.700	11.225	19.300	10.950	10.950	11.150	85.275

=== Junior Individual ===
==== Hoop ====
Rank	Gymnast	Nation	D Score	E Score	Pen.	Total
1st place, gold medalist(s)	Polina Shmatko	Russia	10.0	8.825		18.825
2nd place, silver medalist(s)	Tatyana Volozhanina	Bulgaria	9.3	8.450		17.750
3rd place, bronze medalist(s)	Khrystyna Pohranychna	Ukraine	9.3	8.150		17.450
4	Laura Anitei	Romania	8.8	7.950		16.750
5	Narmina Samadova	Azerbaijan	8.5	8.100		16.600
6	Talisa Torretti	Italy	9.0	7.500		16.500
7	Olatz Rodriguez	Spain	8.0	7.550		15.550
8	Celia Joseph-Noel	France	7.6	7.700		15.300

==== Ball ====
Rank	Gymnast	Nation	D Score	E Score	Pen.	Total
1st place, gold medalist(s)	Lala Kramarenko	Russia	9.7	8.750		18.450
2nd place, silver medalist(s)	Khrystyna Pohranychna	Ukraine	9.1	8.350		17.450
3rd place, bronze medalist(s)	Arzu Jalilova	Azerbaijan	8.8	8.300		17.100
4	Paula Serrano	Spain	9.1	7.750		16.850
5	Tatyana Volozhanina	Bulgaria	8.5	8.300		16.800
6	Eva Swahili Gherardi	Italy	8.8	7.950		16.750
7	Anna Kamenshchikova	Belarus	8.8	7.500		16.300
8	Yulia Vodopyanova	Armenia	7.8	6.375	0.300	13.875

==== Clubs ====
Rank	Gymnast	Nation	D Score	E Score	Pen.	Total
1st place, gold medalist(s)	Daria Trubnikova	Russia	8.8	8.550		17.350
2nd place, silver medalist(s)	Anna Kamenshchikova	Belarus	8.2	8.525		16.725
3rd place, bronze medalist(s)	Valeriia Sotskova	Israel	8.3	8.150		16.450
4	Khrystyna Pohranychna	Ukraine	8.4	7.750		16.150
5	Sofia Raffaeli	Italy	8.4	7.750		16.150
6	Tatyana Volozhanina	Bulgaria	8.5	7.600		16.100
7	Yulia Vodopyanova	Armenia	7.3	6.550		13.850
8	Narmina Samadova	Azerbaijan	7.0	6.250	0.600	12.650

==== Ribbon ====
Rank	Gymnast	Nation	D Score	E Score	Pen.	Total
1st place, gold medalist(s)	Lala Kramarenko	Russia	8.4	8.600		17.000
2nd place, silver medalist(s)	Khrystyna Pohranychna	Ukraine	7.9	8.075		15.975
3rd place, bronze medalist(s)	Talisa Torretti	Italy	*7.6	7.625		15.225
4	Tatyana Volozhanina	Bulgaria	7.1	7.650		14.750
5	Adi Asya Katz	Israel	*6.5	8.100		14.600
6	Yelyzaveta Luzan	Azerbaijan	6.9	6.950		12.950
7	Yana Striga	Belarus	6.0	6.800		12.800
8	Celia Joseph-Noel	France	5.9	6.700	0.050	12.550

- Note: Asterisk sign (*) informs that score was under inquire

=== Senior Individual ===
==== All-around ====
Rank	Gymnast	Nation	Hoop (rhythmic gymnastics)	Ball (rhythmic gymnastics)	Clubs (rhythmic gymnastics)	Ribbon (rhythmic gymnastics)	Total
1st place, gold medalist(s)	Arina Averina	Russia	20.950 (1)	20.200 (2)	19.400 (2)	18.700 (3)	79.250
2nd place, silver medalist(s)	Dina Averina	Russia	20.200 (2)	18.750 (6)	20.050 (1)	18.750 (2)	77.750
3rd place, bronze medalist(s)	Katsiaryna Halkina	Belarus	20.200 (2)	19.650 (3)	18.770 (4)	19.000 (1)	77.620
4	Linoy Ashram	Israel	20.050 (4)	20.350 (1)	18.820 (3)	15.800	75.020
5	Katrin Taseva	Bulgaria	17.770 (10)	19.400 (5)	18.050 (6)	18.350 (4)	73.570
6	Salome Pazhava	Georgia	18.850 (5)	18.000 (10)	17.600 (9)	15.900 (9)	70.350
7	Milena Baldassarri	Italy	18.050 (9)	18.600 (7)	18.250 (5)	15.350	70.250
8	Alexandra Agiurgiuculese	Italy	17.175	18.600 (7)	16.850	16.600 (6)	69.250
9	Nicol Zelikman	Israel	18.400 (7)	17.800	16.000	16.900 (5)	69.100
10	Anastasiia Salos	Belarus	16.600	19.450 (4)	17.250 (10)	15.600	68.900
11	Vlada Nikolchenko	Ukraine	18.200 (8)	18.250 (9)	15.550	16.600 (6)	68.600
12	Yeva Meleshchuk	Ukraine	16.450	17.900	17.800 (7)	16.370 (8)	68.520
13	Eleni Kelaiditi	Greece	17.350	17.750	17.750 (8)	15.250	68.100
14	Neviana Vladinova	Bulgaria	18.500 (6)	15.625	16.700	15.875 (10)	66.700
15	Nicol Ruprecht	Austria	17.150	16.500	16.300	15.250	65.200
16	Fanni Pigniczki	Hungary	16.500	16.850	16.050	14.820	64.220
17	Andreea Verdes	Romania	16.400	15.400	16.600	15.050	63.450
18	Zohra Aghamirova	Azerbaijan	15.600	17.600	15.850	14.150	63.200
19	Axelle Jovenin	France	16.750	14.850	16.350	15.150	63.100
20	Polina Berezina	Spain	16.500	16.550	14.650	14.700	62.400
21	Denisa Mailat	Romania	15.970	16.700	14.800	14.700	62.170
22	Veronika Hudis	Azerbaijan	15.350	16.750	15.750	13.400	61.250
23	Iasmina Agagulian	Armenia	14.800	15.900	13.850	15.450	60.000
24	Carmen Marii Aesma	Estonia	10.100	14.350	11.600	14.300	50.350

=== Senior Groups ===
==== Group all-around ====
Rank	Nation	3, 2	5	Total
1st place, gold medalist(s)	Russia	21.125	22.500	43.625
2nd place, silver medalist(s)	Italy	21.100	21.800	42.900
3rd place, bronze medalist(s)	Bulgaria	18.650	23.100	41.750
4	Ukraine	18.700	21.050	39.750
5	Spain	17.850	19.200	37.050
6	Belarus	17.400	18.750	36.150
7	Azerbaijan	18.500	17.200	35.700
8	Estonia	16.600	18.150	34.750
9	Finland	17.150	17.550	34.700
10	France	16.675	17.100	33.775
11	Poland	15.650	17.900	33.550
12	Hungary	15.700	16.200	31.900
13	Switzerland	16.300	15.500	31.800
14	Latvia	13.650	15.700	29.350
15	Slovenia	13.100	15.100	28.200
16	Israel	16.550	11.500	28.050
17	Greece	11.000	14.150	25.150
18	Austria	11.150	10.950	22.100
19	Norway	8.250	10.750	19.000

==== 5 Hoops ====
Rank	Nation	D Score	E Score	Pen.	Total
1st place, gold medalist(s)	Italy	13.8	8.550		22.350
2nd place, silver medalist(s)	Ukraine	14.1	8.000		22.100
3rd place, bronze medalist(s)	Russia	13.7	7.900		21.600
4	Bulgaria	13.4	7.850		21.250
5	Belarus	12.9	7.500		20.400
6	Spain	11.3	7.450		18.750
7	Poland	11.4	6.200		17.600
8	Estonia	11.5	5.525		16.425

==== 3 Balls + 2 Ropes ====
Rank	Nation	D Score	E Score	Pen.	Total
1st place, gold medalist(s)	Bulgaria	14.2	8.625		22.825
2nd place, silver medalist(s)	Italy	13.8	8.550		22.350
3rd place, bronze medalist(s)	Azerbaijan	12.8	7.550		21.550
4	Belarus	12.5	7.300		19.800
5	Ukraine	12.1	6.850		18.950
6	Spain	11.4	7.400		18.800
7	Russia	12.2	6.400	0.600	18.000
8	Finland	10.1	6.450		16.550

== Medal table ==
Rank	Nation	Gold	Silver	Bronze	Total
1	Russia (RUS)	7	1	1	9
2	Italy (ITA)	1	2	1	4
3	Bulgaria (BUL)	1	1	2	4
4	Ukraine (UKR)	0	4	1	5
5	Belarus (BLR)	0	1	1	2
6	Azerbaijan (AZE)	0	0	2	2
7	Israel (ISR)	0	0	1	1
Totals (7 entries)		9	9	9	27
