= Martina Centofanti =

Italian rhythmic gymnast (born 1998)

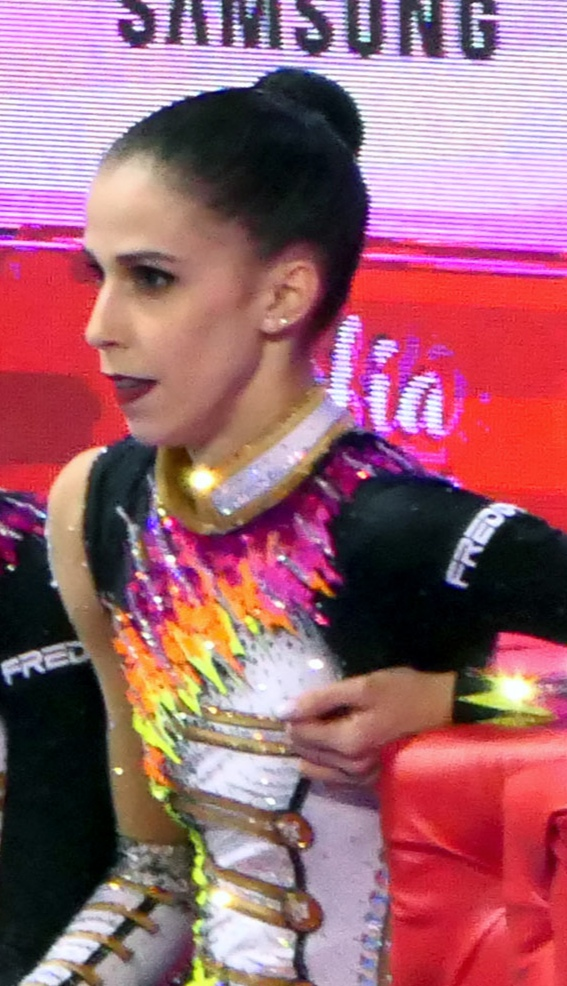
- Centofanti at the 2024 Sofia World Cup

Personal information
- Nicknames: Cento, Marty
- Born: 19 May 1998 (age 28) Rome, Italy
- Height: 1.70 m (5 ft 7 in)

Gymnastics career
- Discipline: Rhythmic gymnastics
- Country represented: Italy (2013-2024)
- Club: Ginnastica Fabriano ASD
- Head coach: Emanuela Maccarani
- Choreographer: Federica Bagnera
- Retired: 2025
Medal record
Rhythmic Gymnastics
Representing Italy
Olympic Games
Bronze medal – third place	2020 Tokyo	Group All-around
Bronze medal – third place	2024 Paris	Group All-around
World Championships
Gold medal – first place	2015 Stuttgart	5 Ribbons
Gold medal – first place	2017 Pesaro	5 Hoops
Gold medal – first place	2018 Sofia	3 Balls + 2 Ropes
Gold medal – first place	2021 Kitakyushu	3 Hoops + 4 Clubs
Gold medal – first place	2022 Sofia	Team
Silver medal – second place	2015 Stuttgart	6 Clubs + 2 Hoops
Silver medal – second place	2018 Sofia	Group All-around
Silver medal – second place	2021 Kitakyushu	Team
Silver medal – second place	2021 Kitakyushu	Group All-around
Silver medal – second place	2021 Kitakyushu	5 Balls
Bronze medal – third place	2018 Sofia	5 Hoops
Bronze medal – third place	2019 Baku	3 Hoops + 4 Clubs
Bronze medal – third place	2023 Valencia	Team
Bronze medal – third place	2023 Valencia	5 Hoops
European Championships
Gold medal – first place	2018 Guadalajara	5 Hoops
Gold medal – first place	2022 Tel Aviv	5 Hoops
Gold medal – first place	2022 Tel Aviv	3 Ribbons + 2 Balls
Gold medal – first place	2024 Budapest	5 Hoops
Silver medal – second place	2018 Guadalajara	Group All-around
Silver medal – second place	2018 Guadalajara	3 Balls + 2 Ropes
Silver medal – second place	2021 Varna	Group All-around
Silver medal – second place	2022 Tel Aviv	Group All-around
Silver medal – second place	2022 Tel Aviv	Team
Silver medal – second place	2024 Budapest	Team
Silver medal – second place	2024 Budapest	Group All-around
Bronze medal – third place	2021 Varna	3 Hoops + 4 Clubs
Bronze medal – third place	2023 Baku	5 Hoops
European Cup
Silver medal – second place	2024 Baku	Group All-around
Silver medal – second place	2024 Baku	5 Hoops
Silver medal – second place	2024 Baku	3 Ribbons + 2 Balls

Martina Centofanti (born 19 May 1998) is an Italian group rhythmic gymnast. She represented Italy at three consecutive Olympic Games and is a two-time bronze medalist (2020, 2024). She is a five-time World champion and a four-time European champion.

== Early life ==
Centofanti was born on 19 May 1998 in Rome. She is the daughter of Italian former footballer Felice Centofanti. She began rhythmic gymnastics when she was nine years old.

== Gymnastics career ==
=== Junior ===
Centofanti competed at the 2013 Junior European Championships in Vienna, Austria, with the Italian group that placed sixth in both the all-around and 5 hoops.

=== 2015–2017 ===
Centofanti competed with the Italian group at the 2015 World Championships that finished fourth in the all-around. They went on to win the 5 ribbons title, thanks to their high difficulty score. They also won a silver medal in the 6 clubs and 2 hoops final by only 0.025 behind Russia.

Centofanti competed at the 2016 Summer Olympics alongside Sofia Lodi, Camilla Patriarca, Marta Pagnini, and Alessia Maurelli. In the group all-around final, they finished in fourth place, nearly two-tenths of a point away from a medal.

At the 2017 World Championships, Centofanti and the Italian group finished fourth in the all-around. They then won the gold medal in the 5 hoops final.

=== 2018 ===
Centofanti and the Italian group won the all-around and 5 hoops titles at the Minsk World Cup. They also won the all-around gold at the Kazan World Challenge Cup. They won a gold medal in 5 hoops and silver medals in the all-around and 3 balls and 2 ropes at the European Championships. Then at the 2018 World Championships, they won the silver medal in the all-around behind Russia and qualified for the 2020 Summer Olympics.

=== 2019 ===
At the Pesaro World Cup, Centofanti helped the Italian group win the 5 hoops gold and all-around bronze. Then at the Guadalajara World Challenge Cup, they won the all-around gold medal, the 5 hoops silver medal, and the 3 hoops and 4 clubs bronze medal. They won two gold medals, including the all-around title, and one silver medal at the Portimao World Challenge Cup.

=== 2021 ===
Centofanti helped the Italian group sweep the silver medals, all behind Bulgaria, at the Baku World Cup. Then at the Pesaro World Cup, they won gold medals in both event finals ahead of Russia. She then represented Italy at the 2020 Summer Olympics alongside Agnese Duranti, Alessia Maurelli, Daniela Mogurean, and Martina Santandrea. They qualified for the group all-around final in third place, and they won the bronze medal in the final.

Centofanti and the Italian group then competed at the 2021 World Championships. They won the silver medal in the group all-around behind Russia. In the event finals, they won the gold medal in 3 hoops and 4 clubs and the silver medal in 5 balls. Additionally, the Italian group and individuals Alexandra Agiurgiuculese, Milena Baldassarri, and Sofia Raffaeli won the silver medal in the team competition.

=== 2022 ===
Centofanti helped the Italian group win two gold medals and one silver medal at the 2022 Baku World Cup. They then swept the gold medals at the Pamplona World Challenge Cup and at the Pesaro World Cup. At the 2022 European Championships, they won a silver medal in the group all-around behind Israel. They then won the gold medals in both event finals. They missed out on a group all-around medal and an Olympic berth at the 2022 World Championships due to mistakes, but the Italian team of the group, Milena Baldassarri, and Sofia Raffaeli won the team competition. In the event finals, they won the gold medal in 5 hoops and the silver medal behind Bulgaria in 3 ribbons and 2 balls.

=== 2023 ===
Centofanti and the Italian group won a gold medal in 3 ribbons and 2 balls at the Athens World Cup. At the Milan World Cup, they then won the all-around title after winning a tie-breaker over Israel. They then lost to Israel in the 5 hoops final but won 3 ribbons and 2 balls. They won the bronze medal in 5 hoops at the 2023 European Championships. At the 2023 World Championships, the Italian group finished fourth in the all-around after multiple mistakes in the 3 ribbons and 2 balls routine. However, they did qualify for the 2024 Summer Olympics as they were among the top five eligible groups. They did qualify for the 5 hoops final and won the bronze medal behind China and Spain in addition to winning a team bronze medal.

=== 2024 ===
Centofanti helped the Italian group sweep the gold medals at the Athens World Cup. They then swept the silver medals at the European Cup. Then at the 2024 European Championships in Budapest, Hungary, the Italian group won the title in 5 hoops. Additionally, they won silver medals in the group all-around and team events.

Centofanti competed at the 2024 Summer Olympics alongside Alessia Maurelli, Agnese Duranti, Daniela Mogurean, and Laura Paris. The group won the bronze medal in the group all-around final, behind China and Israel. In December 2024, Centofanti had surgery to repair the medial patellofemoral ligament in her right knee.

Centofanti announced her retirement from competitive gymnastics on May 4, 2025, in an Instagram post.

== Achievements ==
- Participated in three consecutive editions of the Olympic Games (Rio 2016, Tokyo 2021, Paris 2024). Record shared with Alessia Maurelli, Elisa Blanchi and Elisa Santoni.

== Detailed Olympic results ==
Year	Competition Description	Location	Music	Apparatus	Rank	Score-Final	Rank	Score-Qualifying
2016	Olympics	Rio de Janeiro		All-around	4th	35.549	4th	35.349
2016	Olympics	Rio de Janeiro	Tu Si Na Cosa Grande, Tammurriata, Nessun Dorma by Massimo Ranieri, Unknown, Luciano Pavarotti	5 Ribbons	4th	17.516	5th	17.516
2016	Olympics	Rio de Janeiro	Faust: VII. Danse de Phryne. Allegretto vivo Herbert von Karajan	6 Clubs + 2 Hoops	3rd	18.033	3rd	17.833
2020	Olympics	Tokyo		All-around	3rd	87.700	3rd	87.150
2020	Olympics	Tokyo	Butterfly-Ninja by Maxime Rodriguez	5 Balls	4th	44.850	3rd	44.600
2020	Olympics	Tokyo	Tree of Life Suite by R. Cacciapaglia, Royal Philharmonic Orchestra	3 Hoops + 4 Clubs	3rd	42.850	4th	42.550
2024	Olympics	Paris		All-around	3rd	68.100	2nd	69.350
2024	Olympics	Paris	Scherzo Molto Vivace from Symphony No. 9, Greatness by Audiomachine, Vo Williams	5 Hoops	3rd	36.100	2nd	38.200
2024	Olympics	Paris	The Ecstasy of Gold by Ennio Morricone, Czech National Symphony Orchestra	3 Ribbons + 2 Balls	4th	32.000	6th	31.150
