= Martina Santandrea =

Italian rhythmic gymnast (born 1999)

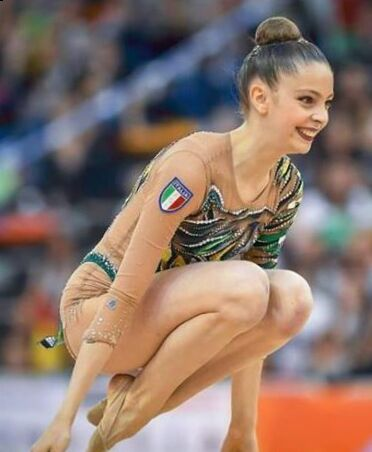

Personal information
- Full name: Martina Santandrea
- Born: 5 September 1999 (age 27) Bentivoglio, Emilia-Romagna, Italy
- Height: 170 cm (5 ft 7 in)

Gymnastics career
- Discipline: Rhythmic gymnastics
- Country represented: Italy (2016–2023)
- Club: Estense Putinati
- Head coach: Emanuela Maccarani
- Choreographer: Federica Bagnera
- Retired: 2023
Medal record
Group Rhythmic Gymnastics
Representing Italy
Olympic Games
| Bronze medal – third place | 2020 Tokyo | Group All-around |
World Championships
| Gold medal – first place | 2017 Pesaro | 5 Hoops |
| Gold medal – first place | 2018 Sofia | 3 Balls + 2 Ropes |
| Gold medal – first place | 2021 Kitakyushu | 3 Hoops + 4 Clubs |
| Gold medal – first place | 2022 Sofia | Team |
| Silver medal – second place | 2018 Sofia | Group All-around |
| Silver medal – second place | 2021 Kitakyushu | Team |
| Silver medal – second place | 2021 Kitakyushu | Group All-around |
| Silver medal – second place | 2021 Kitakyushu | 5 Balls |
| Bronze medal – third place | 2018 Sofia | 5 Hoops |
| Bronze medal – third place | 2019 Baku | 3 Hoops + 4 Clubs |
European Championships
| Gold medal – first place | 2018 Guadalajara | 5 Hoops |
| Gold medal – first place | 2022 Tel Aviv | 5 Hoops |
| Gold medal – first place | 2022 Tel Aviv | 3 Ribbons + 2 Balls |
| Silver medal – second place | 2018 Guadalajara | Group All-around |
| Silver medal – second place | 2018 Guadalajara | 3 Balls + 2 Ropes |
| Silver medal – second place | 2021 Varna | Group All-around |
| Silver medal – second place | 2022 Tel Aviv | Group All-around |
| Silver medal – second place | 2022 Tel Aviv | Team |
| Bronze medal – third place | 2021 Varna | 3 Hoops + 4 Clubs |

Martina Santandrea (born 5 September 1999) is an Italian retired group rhythmic gymnast. She was a member of the national squad from 2016 to 2023. She is the 2020 Olympic group all-around bronze medalist, the 2018 World group all-around silver medalist and two-time European group all-around silver medalist.

== Gymnastics career ==
Santandrea began rhythmic gymnastics in 2006 and joined the national group in 2016.

Santandrea competed at her first World Championships in 2017. She helped the Italian group finish fourth in the all-around. They then won the gold medal in the 5 hoops final. She won a gold medal in 5 hoops and silver medals in the all-around and 3 balls and 2 ropes at the 2018 European Championships. Then at the 2018 World Championships, they won the silver medal in the all-around behind Russia and qualified for the 2020 Summer Olympics. In the 3 balls and 2 ropes final, the group won a gold medal, and they won a bronze medal in the 5 hoops final.

At the 2019 Pesaro World Cup, Santandrea helped the Italian group win the 5 hoops gold and all-around bronze. Then at the Guadalajara World Challenge Cup, they won the all-around gold medal, the 5 hoops silver medal, and the 3 hoops and 4 clubs bronze medal. They won two gold medals, including the all-around title, and one silver medal at the Portimao World Challenge Cup.

Santandrea competed at the 2021 European Championships in Varna, Bulgaria, and won a silver medal in the group all-around and a bronze medal in the 3 hoops and 4 clubs final. She then represented Italy at the 2020 Summer Olympics alongside Agnese Duranti, Alessia Maurelli, Martina Centofanti, and Daniela Mogurean. They qualified for the group all-around final in third place, and they won the bronze medal in the final. The Italian group then competed at the 2021 World Championships. They won the silver medal in the group all-around behind Russia. In the event finals, they won the gold medal in 3 hoops and 4 clubs and the silver medal in 5 balls. Additionally, the Italian group and individuals Alexandra Agiurgiuculese, Milena Baldassarri, and Sofia Raffaeli won the silver medal in the team competition.

Santandrea helped the Italian group win two gold medals and one silver medal at the 2022 Baku World Cup. They then swept the gold medals at the Pamplona World Challenge Cup. They once again swept the gold medals at their home World Cup stage in Pesaro. They won a silver medal in the group all-around at the 2022 European Championships behind Israel, but they won gold in both event finals. At the 2022 World Championships, they missed out on a group all-around medal and an Olympic berth, but the Italian team of the group, Milena Baldassarri, and Sofia Raffaeli won the team competition. In the event finals, they won the gold medal in 5 hoops and the silver medal behind Bulgaria in 3 ribbons and 2 balls.

In 2023, at the age of 24, she retired from professional competition, expressing her desire to become a coach.

== Detailed Olympic results ==
| Year | Competition Description | Location | Music | Apparatus | Rank | Score-Final | Rank | Score-Qualifying |
|---|---|---|---|---|---|---|---|---|
| 2020 | Olympics | Tokyo | | All-around | 3rd | 87.700 | 3rd | 87.150 |
| 2020 | Olympics | Tokyo | Butterfly-Ninja by Maxime Rodriguez | 5 Balls | 4th | 44.850 | 3rd | 44.600 |
| 2020 | Olympics | Tokyo | Tree of Life Suite by R. Cacciapaglia, Royal Philharmonic Orchestra | 3 Hoops + 4 Clubs | 3rd | 42.850 | 4th | 42.550 |
