= Ksenia Polyakova =

Russian rhythmic gymnast (born 2000)

Kseniia Poliakova
- Full name: Ksenia Vitalievna Poliakova
- Alternative name: Ksenia Polyakova
- Born: 15 August 2000 (age 26) Samara, Russia
- Height: 175 cm (5 ft 9 in)

Gymnastics career
- Discipline: Rhythmic gymnastics
- Country represented: Russia (2016–2019)
- Gym: Novogorsk
- Head coach: Irina Viner
- Assistant coach: Tatiana Sergaeva
Medal record
Representing Russia
Group Rhythmic Gymnastics
World Championships
Gold medal – first place	2017 Pesaro	Group All-around
Gold medal – first place	2017 Pesaro	3 Balls + 2 Ropes
Gold medal – first place	2018 Sofia	Group All-around
Silver medal – second place	2017 Pesaro	5 Hoops
Silver medal – second place	2018 Sofia	3 Balls + 2 Ropes
European Championships
Gold medal – first place	2016 Holon	Group All-around
Gold medal – first place	2018 Guadalajara	Team
Gold medal – first place	2018 Guadalajara	Group All-around
Bronze medal – third place	2018 Guadalajara	5 Hoops
Junior European Championships
Gold medal – first place	2015 Minsk	Group All-around
Silver medal – second place	2015 Minsk	5 Balls

Ksenia Vitalievna Poliakova (Russian: Ксения Витальевна Полякова; born 25 August 2000) is a Russian former group rhythmic gymnast. She is a three-time World champion and a three-time European champion, and she was an alternate for the 2016 Summer Olympics.

== Gymnastics career ==
Poliakova started rhythmic gymnastics when she was three years old after a doctor recommended the sport to help with her flat feet. She moved from Samara to Moscow in 2012 to further her training after being invited to join the Russian national team.

Poliakova was selected to compete for the Russian group at the 2015 Junior European Championships. She won a gold medal in the group all-around competition and a silver medal in the 5 balls final, behind Belarus.

Poliakova became age-eligible for senior competition in 2016 and was added to the senior Russian national group. She competed at the 2016 European Championships, helping the Russian group win the all-around title. She was initially named to represent Russia at the 2016 Summer Olympics; however, she broke her ankle and was removed from the team. She still traveled to Rio de Janeiro to train as Russia's reserve athlete, but she did not receive a medal.

Poliakova returned to competition and was selected for the 2017 World Championships team. She helped the Russian group win the all-around title, and she also won a gold medal in the 3 balls + 2 ropes final and a silver medal in the 5 hoops final. At the 2018 European Championships, she won gold medals in the team event and the group all-around event. She won a silver medal in the group all-around at the 2018 Minsk World Challenge Cup, where Russia lost to Italy. Then at the Kazan World Challenge Cup, Poliakova and the Russian group lost the all-around title due to a tie-breaker against Italy.

One month before the 2018 World Championships, Poliakova tore a ligament in her ankle, but she still competed against her doctor's recommendation. She helped Russia defend their World group all-around title and qualify for the 2020 Summer Olympics, and she also won a silver medal in the 3 balls and 2 ropes final.

== Personal life ==
Since retiring from rhythmic gymnastics, Poliakova has worked as a coach in the sport. In 2024, she married Olympic fencing medalist Anton Borodachev.
