= 2015 Rhythmic Gymnastics European Championships =

- Venue: Minsk-Arena
- Location: Minsk, Belarus
- Start date: 1 May 2015
- End date: 3 May 2015
- Nations: 38 members of the European Union of Gymnastics

The 2015 Rhythmic Gymnastics European Championships, the 31st edition, took place from 1 to 3 May 2015 in Minsk, Belarus at the Minsk-Arena. It was the second time Minsk hosted the European Championships.

This edition of the competition featured only junior groups and senior individuals. Although an individual's all-around score (top three apparatus scores) were used to determine the qualifiers for the 2016 European Championships, there was no all-around competition or final at the event itself. The qualification round also acted as the team competition. More than 80 senior gymnasts and 150 junior gymnasts in 26 groups from a record 38 countries competed.

The host nation Belarus won the most medals overall, with nine, while Russian gymnasts won eight medals total and all but one of the seven titles.

In the individual competition, European and World champion Yana Kudryavtseva won three of the four apparatus titles. She did not compete with the last apparatus, hoop, and that title was won instead by Margarita Mamun. Belarusian Melitina Staniouta was the only gymnast to medal in every apparatus final, winning silver with hoop and ribbon and bronze with ball and clubs. Russia won the team event, followed by Belarus and Ukraine.

In the junior group competition, the Russian group won the all-around, followed by Belarus and Israel. In the 5 balls final, the Belarusian group rose to win gold, the only gold medal won by non-Russian gymnasts, while Russia won silver and Bulgaria bronze.

== Participating countries ==
- Andorra
- Armenia
- Austria
- Azerbaijan
- Belarus
- Bulgaria
- Croatia
- Cyprus
- Czech Republic
- Estonia
- Finland
- France
- Great Britain
- Georgia
- Germany
- Greece
- Hungary
- Israel
- Italy
- Latvia
- Lithuania
- Moldova
- Netherlands
- Norway
- Poland
- Portugal
- Romania
- Russia
- Slovenia
- San Marino
- Serbia
- Slovakia
- Spain
- Switzerland
- Sweden
- Turkey
- Ukraine

== Competition schedule ==
- Friday May 1
  - 10:00–12:10 CI junior groups 1st presentation
  - 14:00–15:45 CI seniors individual hoop and ball Group C
  - 16:00–18:00 CI seniors individual hoop and ball Group B
  - 19:15–21:00 CI seniors individual hoop and ball Group A
- Saturday May 2
  - 10:00–12:15 CI junior groups 2nd presentation
  - 14:00–16:00 CI seniors individual clubs and ribbon Group B
  - 16:15–18:00 CI seniors individual clubs and ribbon Group C
  - 18:15–20:00 CI seniors individual clubs and ribbon Group A
- Sunday May 3
  - 11:00–11:45 CIII Apparatus finals junior groups
  - 13:30–14:20 CIII Apparatus finals seniors hoop and ball
  - 14:55–15:45 CIII Apparatus finals seniors clubs and ribbon

== Medalists ==
Event	Gold	Silver	Bronze
Senior Finals
Team	Russia; Yana Kudryavtseva; Margarita Mamun; Aleksandra Soldatova	Belarus; Katsiaryna Halkina; Melitina Staniouta	Ukraine; Viktoriia Mazur; Ganna Rizatdinova; Eleonora Romanova
Hoop	Margarita Mamun (RUS)	Melitina Staniouta (BLR)	Katsiaryna Halkina (BLR)
Ball	Yana Kudryavtseva (RUS)	Margarita Mamun (RUS)	Melitina Staniouta (BLR)
Clubs	Yana Kudryavtseva (RUS)	Ganna Rizatdinova (UKR)	Katsiaryna Halkina (BLR); Melitina Staniouta (BLR)
Ribbon	Yana Kudryavtseva (RUS)	Melitina Staniouta (BLR)	Marina Durunda (AZE)
Junior Group Finals
All-around	Russia; Ekaterina Fedorova; Anastasia Kalabina; Mariia Kravtsova; Ksenia Polyakova; Angelina Shkatova	Belarus; Marharyta Avadzinskaya; Alina Harnasko; Anastasiya Rybakova; Aliaksandra Saladukha; Hanna Shvaiba; Karyna Yarmolenka	Israel; Ofir Dayan; Adi Luiza Kurasov; Kseniya Silin; Nicol Voronkov; Nicol Zelikman
5 Balls	Belarus; Marharyta Avadzinskaya; Alina Harnasko; Anastasiya Rybakova; Aliaksandra Saladukha; Hanna Shvaiba; Karyna Yarmolenka	Russia; Ekaterina Fedorova; Anastasia Kalabina; Mariia Kravtsova; Ksenia Polyakova; Angelina Shkatova	Bulgaria; Teodora Aleksandrova; Vivian Chernookova; Madlen Radukanova; Madlen Sergeeva; Staniela Yovcheva

== Results ==
=== Seniors ===
==== Team ====
Rank	Nation	Hoop (rhythmic gymnastics)	Ball (rhythmic gymnastics)	Clubs (rhythmic gymnastics)	Ribbon (rhythmic gymnastics)	Total
1st place, gold medalist(s)	Russia	37.325	37.416	37.533	37.899	150.173
2nd place, silver medalist(s)	Belarus	36.541	36.316	35.866	35.833	144.556
3rd place, bronze medalist(s)	Ukraine	33.482	35.683	35.100	35.533	139.798
4	Israel	34.733	35.358	34.900	34.666	139.657
5	Azerbaijan	34.066	32.508	34.932	34.941	136.447
6	Finland	33.632	32.633	33.950	33.966	134.181
7	Spain	34.166	32.950	33.50	33.325	133.991
8	Georgia	32.800	33.541	33.683	33.700	133.724
9	Italy	33.300	33.983	33.366	32.649	133.298
10	Bulgaria	30.158	34.416	34.350	34.149	133.073
11	Germany	32.700	33.133	32.949	32.758	131.540
12	Austria	31.149	33.025	31.758	32.616	128.548
13	Czech Republic	32.499	32.724	29.083	32.333	126.589
14	Greece	28.516	33.241	32.600	31.108	125.465
15	Estonia	31.783	31.366	31.557	30.583	125.289
16	Armenia	30.333	31.316	31.082	30.949	123.680
17	Hungary	30.699	30.982	30.641	30.866	123.188
18	Latvia	31.241	30.825	29.758	29.608	121.432
19	Slovenia	30.300	30.666	30.133	28.924	120.023
20	Poland	29.782	30.616	28.782	30.666	119.846
21	Romania	29.349	30.350	28.399	29.449	117.547
22	Great Britain	27.983	29.849	29.166	29.433	116.431
23	Cyprus	28.408	29.474	28.774	29.266	115.922
24	Slovakia	29.666	28.633	27.191	27.833	113.323
25	Croatia	28.166	28.124	28.991	27.583	112.864
26	Lithuania	27.925	28.566	26.616	28.441	111.548
27	Portugal	28.000	28.066	27.566	27.524	111.156
28	Norway	28.266	27.541	26.549	27.749	110.105

==== Hoop ====
Rank	Gymnast	Nation	D Score	E Score	Pen.	Total
1st place, gold medalist(s)	Margarita Mamun	Russia	9.500	9.500		19.000
2nd place, silver medalist(s)	Melitina Staniouta	Belarus	9.200	9.300		18.500
3rd place, bronze medalist(s)	Katsiaryna Halkina	Belarus	8.950	9.000		17.950
4	Salome Phajava	Georgia	8.850	9.033		17.833
5	Victoria Veinberg Filanovsky	Israel	8.450	8.366		16.816
5	Ganna Rizatdinova	Ukraine	8.550	8.266		16.816
7	Aleksandra Soldatova	Russia	8.675	8.200	0.60	16.275
8	Kseniya Moustafaeva	France	7.750	7.266	0.60	14.416

==== Ball ====
Rank	Gymnast	Nation	D Score	E Score	Pen.	Total
1st place, gold medalist(s)	Yana Kudryavtseva	Russia	9.500	9.566		19.066
2nd place, silver medalist(s)	Margarita Mamun	Russia	9.450	9.500		18.950
3rd place, bronze medalist(s)	Melitina Staniouta	Belarus	9.200	9.266		18.466
4	Ganna Rizatdinova	Ukraine	9.000	9.066		18.066
5	Katsiaryna Halkina	Belarus	8.800	9.000		17.800
6	Salome Phajava	Georgia	8.500	8.633		17.133
7	Neta Rivkin	Israel	8.550	8.566		17.116
8	Victoria Veinberg Filanovsky	Israel	8.200	8.666		16.866

==== Clubs ====
Rank	Gymnast	Nation	D Score	E Score	Pen.	Total
1st place, gold medalist(s)	Yana Kudryavtseva	Russia	9.550	9.566		19.166
2nd place, silver medalist(s)	Ganna Rizatdinova	Ukraine	9.200	9.200		18.400
3rd place, bronze medalist(s)	Katsiaryna Halkina	Belarus	8.900	9.133		18.033
3rd place, bronze medalist(s)	Melitina Staniouta	Belarus	9.000	9.033		18.033
5	Marina Durunda	Azerbaijan	8.850	9.100		17.950
6	Neta Rivkin	Israel	8.650	9.100		17.750
7	Salome Phajava	Georgia	8.700	8.966		17.666
8	Aleksandra Soldatova	Russia	8.400	7.933		16.333

==== Ribbon ====
Rank	Gymnast	Nation	D Score	E Score	Pen.	Total
1st place, gold medalist(s)	Yana Kudryavtseva	Russia	9.500	9.400		18.900
2nd place, silver medalist(s)	Melitina Staniouta	Belarus	8.900	9.233		18.133
3rd place, bronze medalist(s)	Marina Durunda	Azerbaijan	8.900	9.100		18.000
4	Katsiaryna Halkina	Belarus	8.850	9.100		17.950
5	Margarita Mamun	Russia	8.800	8.933		17.733
6	Salome Phajava	Georgia	8.750	8.966		17.716
7	Ganna Rizatdinova	Ukraine	8.700	9.000		17.700
8	Kseniya Moustafaeva	France	8.600	8.766		17.366

=== Juniors ===
==== Group all-around ====
Rank	Nation	Ball (rhythmic gymnastics)	Ball (rhythmic gymnastics)	Total
1st place, gold medalist(s)	Russia	16.616	16.650	33.266
2nd place, silver medalist(s)	Belarus	16.133	16.600	32.733
3rd place, bronze medalist(s)	Israel	16.266	16.100	32.366
4	Azerbaijan	15.600	15.725	31.325
5	Germany	15.633	15.516	31.149
6	Italy	15.450	15.550	31.000
7	Bulgaria	15.650	15.233	30.883
8	Switzerland	15.333	15.316	30.649
9	Spain	14.966	15.550	30.516
10	Hungary	15.183	14.166	29.349
11	Turkey	14.133	14.550	28.683
12	Slovakia	14.408	14.191	28.599
13	Austria	14.216	14.233	28.449
14	Finland	13.783	14.633	28.416
15	Czech Republic	13.566	14.533	28.099
16	Norway	13.766	13.991	27.757
17	Lithuania	13.425	14.291	27.716
18	Ukraine	13.683	13.966	27.649
19	Poland	13.850	12.725	26.575
20	Netherlands	12.616	12.666	25.282
21	Latvia	13.608	11.566	25.174
22	Greece	12.241	12.483	24.724
23	Armenia	12.500	11.883	24.383
24	Cyprus	11.800	10.833	22.633
25	Andorra	10.908	10.433	21.341

==== 5 balls ====
Rank	Nation	D Score	E Score	Pen.	Total
1st place, gold medalist(s)	Belarus	7.600	9.133		16.733
2nd place, silver medalist(s)	Russia	7.600	9.000		16.600
3rd place, bronze medalist(s)	Bulgaria	7.400	8.766		16.166
4	Azerbaijan	7.300	8.600		15.900
5	Germany	7.200	8.566		15.766
5	Italy	7.200	8.566		15.766
7	Switzerland	7.200	8.433		15.633
8	Israel	6.950	7.441		14.391

== Medal count ==
Host nation

Rank	Nation	Gold	Silver	Bronze	Total
1	Russia (RUS)	6	2	0	8
2	Belarus (BLR)*	1	4	4	9
3	Ukraine (UKR)	0	1	1	2
4	Azerbaijan (AZE)	0	0	1	1
4	Bulgaria (BUL)	0	0	1	1
4	Israel (ISR)	0	0	1	1
Totals (6 entries)		7	7	8	22
