= Anna Basta =

Italian rhythmic gymnast (born 2001)

- Full name: Anna Basta
- Born: 23 January 2001 (age 25)
- Height: 170 cm (5 ft 7 in)

Gymnastics career
- Discipline: Rhythmic gymnastics
- Country represented: Italy; (2016-2019)
- Club: Polisportiva Pontevecchio
- Head coach: Emanuela Maccarani
- Choreographer: Federica Bagnera
- Retired: yes
Medal record
Group rhythmic gymnastics
Representing Italy
World Championships
Gold medal – first place	2017 Pesaro	5 Hoops
Gold medal – first place	2018 Sofia	3 Balls + 2 Ropes
Silver medal – second place	2018 Sofia	Group All-around
Bronze medal – third place	2018 Sofia	5 Hoops
Bronze medal – third place	2019 Baku	3 Hoops + 4 Clubs
European Championships
Gold medal – first place	2018 Guadalajara	5 Hoops
Silver medal – second place	2018 Guadalajara	Group All-around
Silver medal – second place	2018 Guadalajara	3 Balls + 2 Ropes

Anna Basta (born 23 January 2001) is a retired Italian group rhythmic gymnast who joined as a member of the national squad in 2016. She is the 2018 World Group All-around silver medalist and the European Group All-around silver medalist.

== Career ==
She began rhythmic gymnastics in 2005 at age 4 after previously being enrolled in swimming lessons by her parents and disliking the classes. She took gymnastics classes at the Polisportiva Pontevecchio club in Bologna, Italy.

At the 2017 World Championships in Pesaro, Italy she became World champion in 5 Hoops, missing the podium with the Italian group in the Group All-around competition, finishing in 4th place, just 0.025 points behind Japan.

As a senior competitor, she earned international recognition as a member of the Italian group team, winning accolades as an All-Around silver medalist at the 2018 World Championships in Sofia and as a two-time All-Around silver medalist at the 2018 European Championships. By placing in the top 3 in Group All-around they also qualified for the 2020 Summer Olympics in Tokyo, Japan. Her former senior club was CS Aeronautica Militare, where she is a member of the Italian Air Force.

In 2019, she and her group won the bronze medal in the 3 Hoops + 4 Clubs Final at the 2019 World Championships in Baku, Azerbaijan. She quit the national team later that year, following the development of an eating disorder and accusations of psychological abuse from coaches at the national rhythmic gymnastics training academy in Desio. She had previously spent 11 months out of the year training with the national team since she was 13 years old. An investigation of the national training staff was launched by the Italian Gymnastics Federation in 2022, following claims of abuse from Basta and several other former Italian rhythmic gymnasts.
