= Gymnastics at the 2014 Summer Youth Olympics – Girls' rhythmic individual all-around =

The girls' rhythmic individual all-around at the 2014 Summer Youth Olympics was held on August 26–27 at the Nanjing Olympic Sports Centre. There were two rounds of competition in the individual competition. In each round, competing gymnasts performed four routines. One routine was performed with each of the four apparatus: rope, hoop, ball and clubs. The combined scores from the four routines made up the preliminary qualifications round score. The top eight gymnasts after the preliminary round advanced to the finals. There, they performed each routine again. Scores from the preliminary will not be carried over, the gymnasts start back their routines with maximum of D10/E10 in base value.

== Medalists ==
Gold	Silver	Bronze
Irina Annenkova; Russia	Mariya Trubach; Belarus	Laura Zeng; United States

== Qualification ==
Rank	Gymnast	Hoop	Ball	Clubs	Ribbon	Total	Notes
1	Irina Annenkova (RUS)	15.150	14.575	14.800	14.425	58.950	Q
2	Laura Zeng (USA)	14.875	13.450	14.500	14.550	57.375	Q
3	Mariya Trubach (BLR)	14.700	13.000	14.675	14.475	56.850	Q
4	Linoy Ashram (ISR)	14.050	13.925	13.875	13.725	55.575	Q
5	Ana Luiza Filiorianu (ROU)	14.125	13.850	14.000	13.350	55.325	Q
6	Valeriya Khanina (UKR)	12.900	13.400	14.150	13.650	54.100	Q
7	Nicoleta Dulgheru (MDA)	13.550	13.125	14.150	13.150	53.975	Q
8	Anora Davlyatova (UZB)	13.350	13.150	14.000	13.225	53.725	Q
9	Katerina Marinova (BUL)	13.475	12.475	12.600	13.000	51.550	R
10	Qing Tong Tai (MAS)	13.500	11.850	12.800	12.075	50.225	R
11	Hana Nafie (EGY)	12.500	12.150	12.275	12.500	49.425	
12	Takana Tatsuzawa (JPN)	11.650	12.250	12.700	12.050	48.650	
13	Yelizaveta Mainovskaya (KAZ)	12.025	12.375	11.000	12.950	48.350	
14	Edna Maryel Garcia Amor (MEX)	11.200	11.575	12.250	12.850	47.875	
15	Shannon Gardiner (RSA)	11.350	11.400	11.750	11.150	45.65	
16	Basma Quatay (MAR)	10.500	10.500	11.600	11.250	43.850	
17	Mayra Tiago Sineriz (BRA)	11.550	10.150	10.550	11.050	43.300	
18	Tara Wilkie (AUS)	9.300	10.325	9.150	8.500	37.275	

== Final ==
Rank	Gymnast	Hoop	Ball	Clubs	Ribbon	Total
Gold medal	Irina Annenkova (RUS)	14.975	14.800	14.450	14.350	58.575
Silver medal	Mariya Trubach (BLR)	14.650	14.400	14.000	13.900	56.950
Bronze medal	Laura Zeng (USA)	14.450	14.050	14.400	13.850	56.750
4	Ana Luiza Filiorianu (ROU)	13.500	14.350	13.600	14.400	55.850
5	Linoy Ashram (ISR)	14.200	14.050	13.900	13.475	55.625
6	Valeriya Khanina (UKR)	12.950	13.350	13.900	13.550	53.750
7	Nicoleta Dulgheru (MDA)	13.250	14.100	14.000	11.750	53.100
8	Anora Davlyatova (UZB)	13.200	13.500	13.000	12.775	52.475
