= Gymnastics at the 2017 Summer Universiade – Women's rhythmic individual all-around =

Women's individual all-around at the XXIX Summer Universiade
- Venue: Taipei Nangang Exhibition Center, Hall 1, 4F
- Dates: 27–28 August
- Competitors: 38 from 22 nations

Medalists
1st place, gold medalist(s)		Yulia Bravikova	Russia
2nd place, silver medalist(s)		Ekaterina Selezneva	Russia
3rd place, bronze medalist(s)		Hanna Bazhko	Belarus

The women's individual all-around gymnastics event at the 2017 Summer Universiade from August 27 to 28 at the Taipei Nangang Exhibition Center, Hall 1, 4F in Taipei, Taiwan.

== Final results ==
Qualified for the apparatus final
Reserve for the apparatus final

Rank	Athletic	Hoop (rhythmic gymnastics)		Ball (rhythmic gymnastics)		Clubs (rhythmic gymnastics)		Ribbon (rhythmic gymnastics)		Total (All-around)
Rank	Athletic	Score	Rank	Score	Rank	Score	Rank	Score	Rank	Score
1st place, gold medalist(s)	Yulia Bravikova (RUS)	19.000	1	17.350	2	18.575	1	16.275	2	71.200
2nd place, silver medalist(s)	Ekaterina Selezneva (RUS)	17.750	2	17.975	1	16.900	2	16.550	1	69.175
3rd place, bronze medalist(s)	Hanna Bazhko (BLR)	15.300	10	16.575	4	16.025	4	14.800	4	62.700
4	Kateryna Lutsenko (UKR)	17.500	3	14.950	8	14.800	7	14.450	5	61.700
5	Mariya Trubach (BLR)	15.750	5	15.600	5	16.150	3	13.550	13	61.050
6	Takana Tatsuzawa (JPN)	16.475	4	14.450	11	14.650	8	14.825	3	60.400
7	Serena Lu (USA)	14.850	11	16.600	3	12.950	17	14.400	6	58.800
8	Selina Zhumatayeva (KAZ)	14.750	13	15.250	6	14.000	12	14.400	7	58.400
9	Rut Castillo (MEX)	15.350	8	14.600	10	15.050	6	12.850	14	57.850
10	Anna Afuxenidi (KAZ)	15.300	9	14.100	13	14.150	10	14.100	9	57.650
11	Carmel Kallemaa (EST)	14.800	12	14.100	12	14.450	9	13.700	11	57.050
12	Yana Yarosh (UKR)	15.600	7	15.000	7	15.100	5	11.200	23	56.900
13	Uzume Kawasaki (JPN)	15.725	6	12.850	18	13.700	14	14.350	8	56.625
14	Brigita Budginas (USA)	13.300	21	13.450	17	14.100	11	12.375	16	53.225
15	Xenia Kilianova (SVK)	13.850	17	13.950	14	11.300	25	13.650	12	52.750
16	Viktoria Bogdanova (EST)	13.350	20	14.750	9	9.900	33	13.950	10	51.950
17	Song Yu-han (TPE)	14.700	14	13.750	15	12.650	19	10.800	25	51.900
18	Chan Ting-chen (TPE)	13.250	22	13.625	16	12.700	18	11.250	21	50.825
19	Margit Oeveraas (NOR)	14.000	16	12.225	22	13.250	15	11.200	22	50.675
20	Chun Song-e (KOR)	13.200	23	12.350	20	13.200	16	11.700	20	50.450
21	Mimi-Isabella Cesar (GBR)	13.100	24	12.600	19	13.700	13	11.000	24	50.400
22	Cindy Gallegos (MEX)	13.750	18	11.700	24	12.100	21	12.400	15	49.950
23	Enid Jin Joo Sung (AUS)	12.475	26	11.350	27	12.000	22	12.100	17	47.925
24	Cindy Yu Rim Huh (CAN)	13.450	19	11.100	29	11.300	24	10.700	26	46.550
25	Carolina Garcia (BRA)	12.250	27	11.625	25	9.350	36	12.000	18	45.225
26	Inessa Maria Rif (FIN)	14.250	15	11.800	23	9.350	35	9.775	34	45.175
27	Fanny Cecilie Lunde (NOR)	10.800	32	11.550	26	12.350	20	10.050	33	44.750
28	Zhang Jing (CHN)	12.850	25	11.100	28	9.950	32	10.250	29	44.150
29	Andrea Kheilova (CZE)	11.050	31	10.950	31	10.250	29	11.700	19	43.950
30	Nickolle Abreu (BRA)	11.400	29	10.700	32	11.100	27	10.250	28	43.450
31	Stephani Sherlock (GBR)	10.400	34	12.250	21	9.650	34	10.100	31	42.400
32	Jana Duchnovská (SVK)	9.700	35	10.400	33	11.200	26	10.200	30	41.500
33	Zoe Ormrod (AUS)	12.000	28	9.400	36	11.350	23	8.150	36	40.900
34	Blanka Boldizsar (HUN)	11.250	30	9.950	34	10.150	30	9.050	35	40.400
35	Wu Weiling (CHN)	10.550	33	9.850	35	10.650	28	6.500	38	37.550
36	Monija Čebašek (SLO)	9.550	36	8.600	38	9.250	37	10.050	32	37.450
37	Sandra Andersson (SWE)	7.850	37	9.350	37	8.900	38	7.725	37	33.825
38	Kaedyn Lashley (CAN)	0.000	38	11.100	30	10.100	31	10.500	27	31.700
