= Irina Annenkova =

Russian rhythmic gymnast

- Full name: Irina Yurievna Annenkova
- Nickname: Ira
- Born: February 22, 1999 (age 27) Sochi, Krasnodar Krai, Russia

Gymnastics career
- Discipline: Rhythmic gymnastics
- Country represented: Russia
- Club: Gazprom
- Gym: Novogorsk
- Head coach: Irina Viner
- Assistant coach: Antonina Ivanova
- Choreographer: Natalia Lantsova
Medal record
Representing Russia
Rhythmic Gymnastics
Youth Olympic Games
Gold medal – first place	2014 Nanjing	All-around
Junior European Championships
Gold medal – first place	2014 Baku	Ball
Gold medal – first place	2014 Baku	Ribbon
Gold medal – first place	2014 Baku	Team

Irina Yurievna Annenkova (Russian: Ирина Юрьевна Анненкова; born February 22, 1999, in Sochi, Krasnodar Krai, Russia) is a Russian individual rhythmic gymnast. She is the 2014 Youth Olympic champion and the 2014 European Junior ball and ribbon champion.

== Personal life ==
Annenkova has been practicing gymnastics since the age of 5 but it wasn't until she was 7 years old she had her proper training after begging her grandmother to take her to rhythmic gymnastics class, considered a late start for the sport.

== Career ==
Her international breakthrough event was competing in junior division at the 2012 Moscow Grand Prix. In 2013, Annenkova finished 15th in all-around at the 2013 Russian Junior Championships, she finished 2nd place as out of competition at 2013 Moscow Grand Prix behind Yulia Bravikova. She has also competed at the 2013 Russian-Chinese Youth Games where she won the all-around gold and medaled in all 4 of the event finals. Annenkova briefly competed as member of the Russian Group but returned to competing as an individual gymnast.

In 2014, Annenkova finished 6th in all-around at the 2014 Russian Junior championships. At the 2014 European Junior Championships Annenkova together with teammates (Veronika Polyakova, Yulia Bravikova and Olesya Petrova) won Russia the Team gold. She qualified to 2 event finals winning gold in ball and ribbon. She then competed at the Junior World Cup in Sofia where she won the all-around gold beating Veronika Polyakova by 2.5 points. Following the leg injury of Yulia Bravikova, both Annenkova and Polyakova flew to Nanjing but Annenkova was selected by Irina Viner as the final representative of her country at the 2014 Youth Olympic Games in Nanjing, China. Annenkova led after the qualification round and went on to win in the all-around finals with a total score of 58.575 points putting her ahead of Belarusian Mariya Trubach and America's Laura Zeng.

=== Senior ===
In 2015 season, Annenkova debuted as a senior competing in the international division at the 2015 Moscow Grand Prix. She then competed at the 2015 Baltic Hoop where she won the all-around silver behind Belarusian Melitina Staniouta. In the event finals, Annenkova won 3 gold medals (ball, clubs, ribbon) and silver in hoop. On April 3–5, Annenkova competed at the Irina Deleanu International tournament and won the all-around silver medal behind Veronika Polyakova. Annenkova finished 6th in all-around at the 2015 Russian Championships. Annenkova competed as an HC (Out of Competition) at the MTK International Tournament in Budapest and Dundee Cup International in Sofia.

In 2016, Annenkova began her season competing at the 2016 Grand Prix Moscow finishing 14th in the all-around. In 2017, Annenkova competed at the International Tournament of Portimao and won silver in the all-around.

In 2018, Anenkova competed at the 2018 Moscow International tournament finishing second in the all-around behind Anastasiia Salos.

== Routine music information ==
Year	Apparatus	Music title
2015	Ball	?
2015	Hoop	Khachaturian: Masquerade: I Waltz by Alexander Lazarev & Bolshoi Symphony Orchestra
2015	Clubs	?
2015	Ribbon	Jai Ho! (You Are My Destiny) by A.R. Rahman and The Pussycat Dolls
2014	Ball	’O sole mio by Eduardo di Capua
2014	Hoop	Khachaturian: Masquerade: I Waltz by Alexander Lazarev & Bolshoi Symphony Orchestra
2014	Clubs	Dio E'Zingaro by Municipale Balcanica
2014	Ribbon	Diva by Philipp Kirkorov (Филипп Киркоров)
