= Yana Yarosh =

Ukrainian rhythmic gymnast (born 1999)

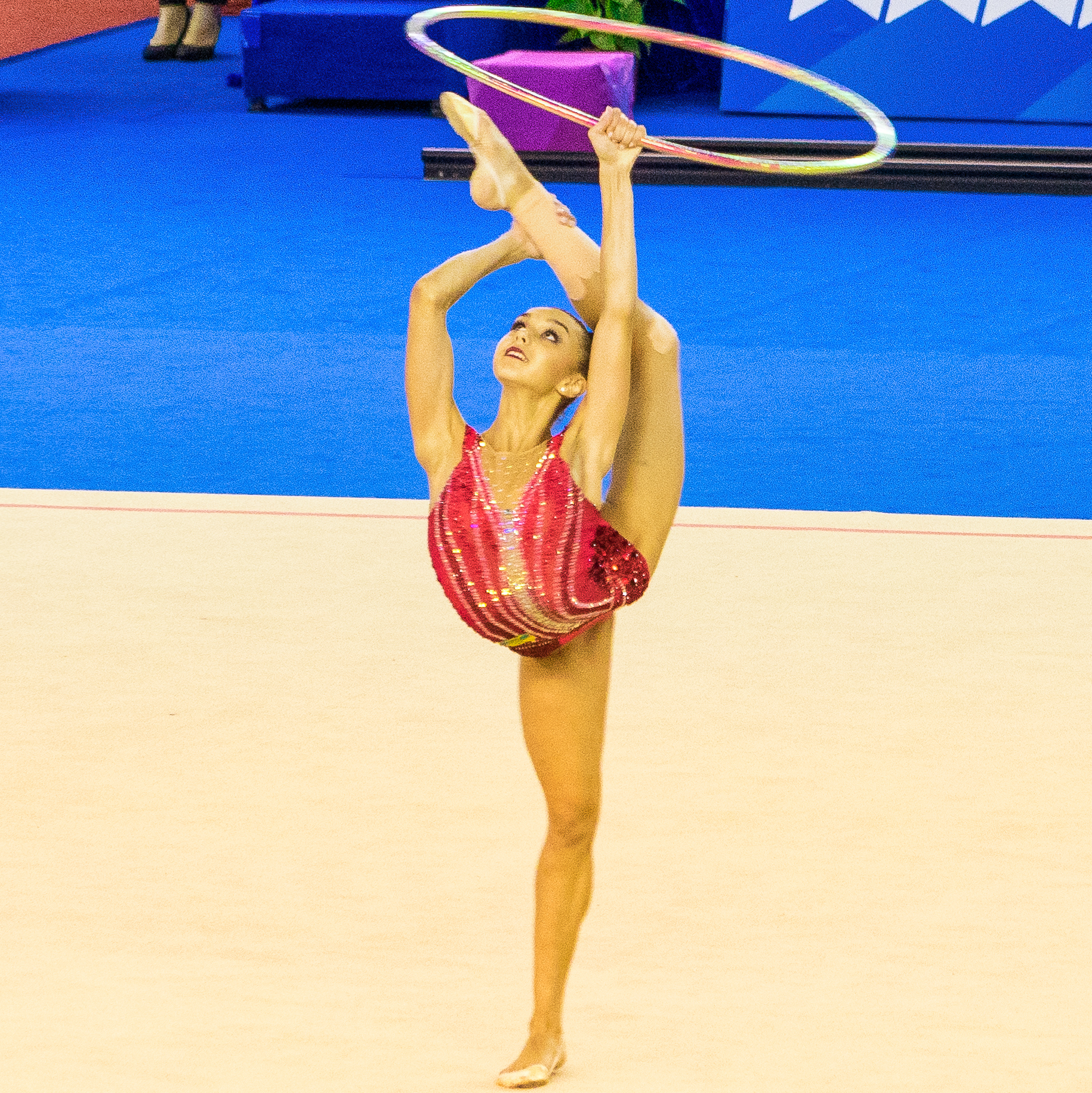

Personal information
- Full name: Yana Vladimirovna Yarosh
- Nickname: Yaroshka
- Born: 5 July 1999 (age 27) Odessa, Ukraine
- Height: 163 cm (5 ft 4 in)

Gymnastics career
- Discipline: Rhythmic gymnastics
- Country represented: Ukraine; (2014 - ?)
- Gym: Deriugins School
- Head coach: Irina Deriugina
- Choreographer: Iryna Blokhina
- Retired: yes

Yana Yarosh (Ukrainian: Ярош Яна Владимировна, born 5 July 1999 in Odessa, Ukraine) is a retired Ukrainian individual rhythmic gymnast.

== Personal life ==
She currently lives in Tenerife, Canary Islands and works as a coach at Club Gimnasia Rítmica Costa Adeje. She got married in March 2025. That same year she gave birth to a son Mark.

== Career ==
Her first coach was Natalya Gennadyevna Lipkina.

=== Junior ===
She competed at the 2014 Junior European Championships in Baku, Azerbaijan, alongside Valeriya Khanina, Mariia Mulyk and Diana Myzherytska. They took 5th place in team competition. She competed with ball (14th place) and ribbon (11th place).

=== Senior ===
In 2017, she won bronze medal in all-around at Ukrainian National Championships. In March, she competed at Grand Prix Kiev and took 16th place in all-around and 6th place in ribbon final. On 27–29 August Yarosh represented Ukraine at the 2017 Summer Universiade in Taipei, finishing 12th in the all-around. She finished 7th in hoop, 8th in ball and 6th in clubs.

== Routine music information ==
Year	Apparatus	Music title
2017	Hoop	Street violin by Josh Vietti
2017	Ball	Scream & Shout by will.i.am
2017	Clubs	I'm an Albatraoz by AronChupa & Little Sis Nora
2017	Ribbon	Khachaturian: Gayane: Sabre Dance by London Symphony Orchestra, Aram Il'yich Khachaturian
