= Aleksandra Semenova =

Russian rhythmic gymnast

- Born: 26 May 1998 (age 28) Veliky Novgorod, Russia

Gymnastics career
- Discipline: Rhythmic gymnastics
- Country represented: Russia Israel; (2010-2015 2026-present)
- Club: Maccabi Ness Ziona
- Former coaches: Irina Viner, Victoria Tekel, G. E. Ulanova
Medal record
Representing Russia
Group Rhythmic Gymnastics
World Championships
Gold medal – first place	2014 Izmir	3 Balls + 2 Ribbons
European Championships
Gold medal – first place	2014 Baku	Group All-around
Gold medal – first place	2014 Baku	3 Balls + 2 Ribbons
Silver medal – second place	2014 Baku	10 Clubs

Aleksandra Semenova (Russian: Александра Семенова, born 26 May 1998) is a Russian rhythmic gymnast who represents Israel in international competitions since 2026.

== Personal life ==
Semenova began practicing rhythmic gymnastics at the age of 2, under the guidance of her mother (Victoria Tekel) and her grandmother. Semenova's father went missing when she was six years old. When Semenova was ten, she and her mother moved to St. Petersburg. Until 2011, she trained at the Zhemchuzhina CHG and then until 2013 at the Pushkin SDYUSSHOR.

== Career ==
=== Junior ===
In 2010, Semenova took 10th place at the Russian Championship, thereby getting into the reserve national team of the Russian national team. In 2011, she took first place at the Youth of Russia competition. She then won gold her first international competition, the Petah Tikva Cup. Semenova was 12th in the Fifth Summer Spartakiad of students in Rostov-on-Don and 10th at the Young Gymnasts tournament in Kazan. She placed first at the Hopes of St. Petersburg. She was 5th at the Hopes of Russia in Kazan.

In January 2012 Semenova again placed first at the Hopes of St. Petersberg. At the Russian Championship in February, she placed 20th, but she was noticed by Irina Viner, the head coach of the Russian national team and offered a chance to perform at the 2012 Moscow Grand Prix. Performing outside the team competition with ball, Semenova scored 23,600 points, finishing in 67th place. During the Championship of Saint Petersburg, she finished in second place, ahead of Diana Ibrahimov. Subsequently, Semenova sustained an injury to her right foot that was successfully treated.

In March 2013, Semenova won bronze at the open championship of St. Petersburg, ahead of Diana Ibragimova and Veronika Rudycheva. She als competed at competed at the Scarlet Sails tournament in St. Petersburg, taking silver behind Diana Ibrahimov. In late 2013 she entered the main Russian national team.

=== Senior ===
==== 2013-2019 ====
In September 2013, Semenova was selected as a member of the Russian rhythmic gymnastics group. Her first competition as a member of the group was the Moscow Grand Prix in 2014, where Russia won gold in the all-around and event finals. At the Thiais Grand Prix, her team again won gold in all the events. They also won gold at the World Cup in Stuttgart. At the Grand Prix in Holon, they took second place in the all-around. At the World Cup in Tashkent, they won the all-around and 3 balls + 2 ribbons final gold and bronze in the 10 clubs final.

Semenova represented Russia at the 2024 European Championships in Baku, where she helped the team win gold in the all-around and also with 3 balls and 2 ribbons; they also won silver with 10 clubs. At the Sofia World Cup, they won all three golds. In September, she competed at the 2014 World Championships in Izmir, Turkey, alongside Daria Avtonomova, Diana Borisova, Anastasiia Maksimova, Anastasiia Tatareva and Maria Tolkacheva. They were 4th in the group all-around and qualified for the 3 balls + 2 ribbons final, where they won gold medal.

In 2015, Semenova was dropped from the main Russian team. On September 6 that year she received the title of Honored Master of Sports of the Russian Federation. She continued competing as an individual gymnast.

She was disqualified from competing for two years in 2019, with the ban dating from November 2018, due to a doping violation involving furosemide. Semenova said that she had not purposefully doped and had taken contaminated medication.

==== 2024-present ====
In November 2024 it was rumoured that she was planning to switch countries and compete for Armenia. However, in October 2026 she received the green light to officially represent Israel internationally. In November, she competed at international tournament Irina Deleanu Cup in Romania and took 7th place in the all-around.

== Routine music information ==
Year	Apparatus	Music title
2026	Hoop	
2026	Ball	
2026	Clubs	Fergalicious by Fergie
2026	Ribbon	
