= Daria Avtonomova =

Russian rhythmic gymnast

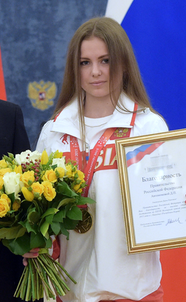

Personal information
- Full name: Daria Pavlovna Avtonomova
- Born: April 24, 1996 (age 30) Moscow, Russia

Gymnastics career
- Discipline: Rhythmic gymnastics
- Country represented: Russia (2014-2016)
- Head coach: Irina Viner
- Former coaches: Sergaeva T.V., Bakaeva G.A., Ilyina O.S., Gribkova T.N.
- Retired: yes
Medal record
Representing Russia
Event	1st	2nd	3rd
World Championships	1	0	0
European Championships	2	1	0
FIG World Cup	6	1	1
Summer Universiade	2	0	1
Total	11	2	2
Rhythmic gymnastics
World Championships
Gold medal – first place	2014 Izmir	3 Balls + 2 Ribbons
European Championships
Gold medal – first place	2014 Baku	Group All-around
Gold medal – first place	2014 Baku	3 Balls + 2 Ribbons
Silver medal – second place	2014 Baku	10 Clubs
Summer Universiade
Gold medal – first place	2015 Gwangju	Group All-around
Gold medal – first place	2015 Gwangju	5 Ribbons
Bronze medal – third place	2015 Gwangju	6 Clubs + 2 Hoops

Daria Pavlovna Avtonomova (born 24 April 1996) is a retired Russian rhythmic gymnast.

== Career ==
In 2013, Daria was noticed by Irina Viner at the Russian Championships where she performed as a group gymnast, she was then invited to a training camp in the national team base in Novogorsk.

In 2014, she entered the Russian senior national group, making her debut at the World Cup in Stuttgart where the group won gold in both event finals. In May 2014 she won gold in the All-Around and with 3 balls & 2 ribbons as well as silver with 10 clubs at the stage in Tashkent. At the European Championships in Baku in June, she won gold in the All-Around and in the mixed event as well as silver with 5 pairs of clubs. In early September the group took part in the last World Cup of season in Kazan, winning bronze in the mixed event and gold in both the All-Around and with 10 clubs. In September Daria was selected for her maiden World Championships in Izmir. There, along Anastasia Maksimova, Aleksandra Semenova, Diana Borisova, Anastasiia Tatareva and Maria Tolkacheva, she took 4th place in the All-Around and gold with 3 balls & 2 ribbons, the only final the group qualified for.

In February 2015, Russian won silver overall and gold in the two finals at the Grand Prix in Moscow. Then she won gold with 5 ribbons at the World Cup in Lisbon. In April the group took 6th place in both event finals at the stage in Pesaro. After that she joined the reserve group that was preparing for the Universiade in Gwangju, South Korea. There Daria, Anastasia Osipova, Arina Nikishova, Daria Kolobova, Iuliia Kosyreva and Valentina Kalinina, won gold in the All-Around and with 5 ribbons as well as bronze with 3 pairs of clubs & 2 hoops. After that she was awarded the title of Honored Master of Sports.

In 2016, she participated in the training camps in Israel and Croatia, before the Olympics she trained with the main team in São Paulo and was the first substitute, but never performed in Rio. At the end of 2016 she decided to end her gymnastics career and started working as a coach.
