= Dulgheru =

Dulgheru, meaning "carpenter", may refer to:

- Dulgheru, a village in Saraiu Commune, Constanța County, Romania

== People with the surname ==
- Alexandra Dulgheru
- Mirela Dulgheru
- Mișu Dulgheru
- Nicoleta Dulgheru
