= Olesya Petrova =

Russian rhythmic gymnast

- Full name: Olesya Vitalievna Petrova
- Alternative name: Olesia
- Nicknames: Olya, Olenka
- Born: 26 April 1999 (age 27) Moscow, Russia

Gymnastics career
- Discipline: Rhythmic gymnastics
- Country represented: Russia
- Gym: Novogorsk
- Head coach: Irina Viner
Medal record
Representing Russia
Rhythmic Gymnastics
Junior European Championships
Gold medal – first place	2014 Baku	Team
Gold medal – first place	2014 Baku	Clubs

Olesya Vitalievna Petrova (Russian: Олеся Витальевна Петрова; born 26 April 1999 in Moscow) is a Russian rhythmic gymnast. She is the 2014 European Junior champion in clubs and with the Russian team.

== Career ==
=== Junior ===
Petrova competed at her first junior nationals at the 2012 Russian Junior Championships where she finished seventeenth in all-around.

During the 2013 season, Petrova finished fourth in all-around at the Russian Junior Championships behind Yulia Bravikova, Aleksandra Soldatova, and Dina Averina. She then won the junior all-around gold medal at the Grand Prix in Brno with a score of 64.316, ahead of her Russian teammate Veronika Polyakova.

In 2014, Petrova once again finished fourth in the all-around at the Russian Junior Championships, this time behind Yulia Bravikova, Veronika Polyakova, and Alina Ermolova. Next, she competed at the World Cup in Lisbon where she won gold medals in team and ball and a bronze medal in clubs. Then at the World Cup in Minsk, she won gold medals in both team and clubs. She then competed at the 2014 Junior European Championships, where Petrova together with teammates Irina Annenkova, Yulia Bravikova, and Veronika Polyakova won the team gold medal. She qualified for the clubs event final where she won the gold medal with a score of 16.400.

=== Senior ===
Petrova sustained an ankle injury early in the 2016 season. She returned to competition at the 2016 Russian Championships and finished fourteenth in the all-around and won the gold medal with the Moscow team.
