= Veronika Polyakova =

Russian rhythmic gymnast

- Full name: Veronika Dmitriyevna Polyakova
- Alternative name: Veronika Poliakova
- Nickname: Vika
- Born: March 3, 1999 (age 27) Irkutsk, Irkutsk Oblast, Russia

Gymnastics career
- Discipline: Rhythmic gymnastics
- Country represented: Russia
- Club: Dinamo Dmitrov
- Head coach: Anna Shumilova
Medal record
Gymnasiades
Gold medal – first place	2013 Brasilia	Hoop
Silver medal – second place	2013 Brasilia	All-Around
Silver medal – second place	2013 Brasilia	Ball
Silver medal – second place	2013 Brasilia	Clubs
Silver medal – second place	2013 Brasilia	Ribbon
Junior European Championships
Gold medal – first place	2014 Baku	Team

Veronika Dmitriyevna Polyakova (off. sp.: Veronika Poliakova; Russian: Вероника Дмитриевна Полякова, born March 3, 1999, in Irkutsk, Russia) is a Russian group and former individual rhythmic gymnast. She is the 2014 Russian Junior National all-around silver medalist.

== Career ==
=== Junior ===
Polyakova has competed both as an individual and in group gymnastics. She was born in Odincovo. Polyakova appeared in international competition at the 2012 Irina Deleanu Cup with teammate Aleksandra Soldatova. She competed in her first Junior nationals at the 2012 Russian Junior Championships finishing 29th in all-around

In 2013 Season, Polyakova finished 10th in all-around at the 2013 Russian Junior Championships. She competed in the junior division at the Grand Prix in Moscow and World Cup Series. She won the all-around gold and event finals at the 2013 Singapore Gymnastics Open. She won the all-around silver medal at the Junior Grand Prix in Brno with a total of 63.049 behind Olesya Petrova.

In 2014, she won the all-around silver at the 2014 Moscow Grand Prix behind Yulia Bravikova. She competed in the World Cup series in Lisbon winning gold in team, bronze in ribbon, in Pesaro winning Team gold for Russia and gold in event finals for hoop. At the 2014 Minsk World Cup she won gold in Team, hoop and ribbon. She won the all-around silver medal at the 2014 Russian Junior Championships. At the 2014 European Junior Championships, Polyakova together with teammates (Irina Annenkova, Yulia Bravikova and Olesya Petrova) won Russia the Team gold. She competed in 2 apparatus, hoop and ribbon but did not qualify to the event finals with Bravikova and Annenkova placing ahead of her in qualifications for the finals in the 1 gymnast per country junior rule. She competed at the 2014 Junior World Cup in Sofia where she won the all-around silver behind Irina Annenkova. Following the leg injury of Yulia Bravikova, both Polyakova and Annenkova flew to Nanjing, there Annenkova was selected by Irina Viner as the final representative of Russia at the 2014 Youth Olympic Games in Nanjing, China. On October 17–19, Polyakova traveled in Tokyo for the 2014 Aeon Cup, representing team Gazprom (together with senior teammates Margarita Mamun and Yana Kudryavtseva) won the team gold. She won the All-around junior title ahead of Belarus' Mariya Trubach.

=== Senior ===
In 2015 season, Polyakova debuted as a senior competing at the 2015 Moscow Grand Prix finishing 6th in the all-around finals. On March 21–22, Polyakova competed at the 2015 Thiais Grand Prix finishing 9th in the all-around, she qualified to 3 event finals. On April 3–5, Polyakova competed at the Irina Deleanu International tournament and won the all-around gold medal ahead Irina Annenkova. She took 4th place in the all-around at the 2015 Russian Championships. Polyakova competed at the 2015 Holon Grand Prix finishing 8th in all-around. Polyakova finished 9th in all-around at the 2015 Grand Prix Berlin and qualified to event final in ball. She won the all-around gold at the 2015 EWUB Luxembourg Trophy. Polyakova competed as an HC (Out of Competition) at the MTK International Tournament in Budapest and Dundee Cup International in Sofia. Polyakova unexpectedly suffered a leg injury before the end of the 2015 season. In 2016, she spent half of the season in rehabilitation from her surgery.

In 2017, Polyakova relocated to St. Petersburg for her university studies and switched to group rhythmic gymnastics.

== Competitive highlights ==
Year	Event	Team	AA	Hoop	Ball	Clubs	Ribb.
International
2014	Aeon Cup	1st	1st J				

== Routine music information ==
Year	Apparatus	Music title
2015	Hoop	"Gypsy Dance" by Ludwig Minkus
2015	Ball	"Sheherazade: The Young Prince And The Young Princess" by Nikolai Rimsky-Korsakov
2015	Clubs	?
2015	Ribbon	Historia de un Amor by Carlos Eleta Almarán
