= Anora Davlyatova =

Uzbekistani rhythmic gymnast

- Born: 17 February 1999 (age 27)

Gymnastics career
- Discipline: Rhythmic gymnastics
- Country represented: Uzbekistan (2015)
Medal record
Rhythmic gymnastics
Representing Uzbekistan
Asian Championships
Gold medal – first place	2017 Astana	Team

Anora Davlyatova (born 17 February 1999) is an Uzbekistani individual rhythmic gymnast.

== Career ==
Davlyatova competed at the 2014 Summer Youth Olympics in Nanjing, China where she qualified in the Finals finishing in 8th place.

Davlyatova has competed at the world championships, including at the 2015 World Rhythmic Gymnastics Championships. On 24–27 June, Davlyatova competed at the 2017 Asian Championships where she was member of the Uzbek Team that won the gold medal.
