= Gymnastics at the 2013 Summer Gymnasiade =

The gymnastics competition at the 2013 Gymnasiade was held from November to December 2013 in Brasília.

== Medal winners ==
=== Artistic gymnastics ===
Event	Gold	Silver	Bronze
Men
Team	Russia	England	France
All-around	Kirill Potapov (RUS)	Nile Wilson (ENG)	Artur Dalaloyan (RUS)
Floor exercise	Giarnni Regini-Moran (ENG)	Botond Kardos (HUN)	Tang Chia-hung (TPE)
Pommel horse	Marios Georgiou (CYP)	Nile Wilson (ENG)	Joe Fraser (ENG)
Still rings	Artur Dalaloyan (RUS)	Nile Wilson (ENG) Jay Thompson (ENG)	—N/a
Vault	Artur Dalaloyan (RUS)	Ângelo Assumpção (BRA)	Jay Thompson (ENG)
Parallel bars	Ivan Stretovich (RUS)	Nile Wilson (ENG)	Giarnni Regini-Moran (ENG)
Horizontal bar	Nile Wilson (ENG)	Artur Dalaloyan (RUS)	Jay Thompson (ENG)
Women
Team	Russia	Brazil	England
All-around	Alla Sosnitskaya (RUS)	Flávia Saraiva (BRA)	Rebeca Andrade (BRA)
Vault	Rebeca Andrade (BRA)	Alla Sosnitskaya (RUS)	Mariana Oliveira (BRA)
Uneven bars	Noémi Makra (HUN)	Loan His (FRA)	Ellie Downie (ENG) Farah Boufadene (FRA)
Balance beam	Flávia Saraiva (BRA)	Mariana Oliveira (BRA)	Viktoria Kuzmina (RUS)
Floor exercise	Flávia Saraiva (BRA)	Argyro Afrati (GRE)	Seda Tutkhalyan (RUS)

=== Rhythmic gymnastics ===
Event	Gold	Silver	Bronze
Individual all-around	Yulia Bravikova (RUS)	Veronika Polyakova (RUS)	Andressa Jardim (BRA)
Hoop	Veronika Polyakova (RUS)	Yulia Bravikova (RUS)	Polina Berezina (ESP)
Ball	Yulia Bravikova (RUS)	Veronika Polyakova (RUS)	Kyriaki Alevrogianni (GRE)
Clubs	Yulia Bravikova (RUS)	Veronika Polyakova (RUS)	Kyriaki Alevrogianni (GRE)
Ribbon	Yulia Bravikova (RUS)	Veronika Polyakova (RUS)	Andressa Jardim (BRA)
Group all-around	Russia	Brazil	—N/a
Group + individuals	Brazil	—N/a	—N/a

=== Aerobic gymnastics ===
Event	Gold	Silver	Bronze
Girls' individual	Belen Guillemot (ESP)	Panna Szollosi (HUN)	Caroline Santos (BRA)
Boys' individual	Daniel Bali (HUN)	Wang Hayou (CHN)	Paulo Santos (BRA)
Mixed pairs	Hungary	Brazil	China
Trios	Hungary	China	Brazil
Groups	Hungary	China	Finland

== Results ==
=== Women's artistic gymnastics ===
==== Team final ====
Rank	Team	Vault (gymnastics)	Uneven bars	Balance beam	Floor (gymnastics)	Total
1st place, gold medalist(s)	Russia	42.450	40.100	42.000	40.600	165.150
1st place, gold medalist(s)	Alla Sosnitskaya	14.200	14.200	14.000	13.650	165.150
1st place, gold medalist(s)	Seda Tutkhalyan	14.300	13.050	14.250	13.500	165.150
1st place, gold medalist(s)	Anastasia Dmitrieva	13.950			13.450	165.150
1st place, gold medalist(s)	Viktoria Kuzmina		12.850	13.750		165.150
1st place, gold medalist(s)	Lilia Akhaimova					165.150
2nd place, silver medalist(s)	Brazil	45.100	36.400	42.400	40.700	164.600
2nd place, silver medalist(s)	Rebeca Andrade	15.850	11.900	13.750	13.850	164.600
2nd place, silver medalist(s)	Mariana Oliveira	14.900	11.650	14.150	13.000	164.600
2nd place, silver medalist(s)	Flávia Saraiva		12.850	14.500	13.850	164.600
2nd place, silver medalist(s)	Julie Sinmon	14.350				164.600
2nd place, silver medalist(s)	Lorena Rocha					164.600
3rd place, bronze medalist(s)	England	43.150	40.050	40.400	39.350	162.950
3rd place, bronze medalist(s)	Ellie Downie	15.100	13.250	13.150	13.450	162.950
3rd place, bronze medalist(s)	Claudia Fragapane	14.300	13.550	13.500	13.100	162.950
3rd place, bronze medalist(s)	Georgina Hockenhull		13.250	13.750		162.950
3rd place, bronze medalist(s)	Rhyannon Jones	13.750			12.800	162.950
3rd place, bronze medalist(s)	Charlie Fellows					162.950

==== All-around ====
Rank	Gymnast	Vault (gymnastics)	Uneven bars	Balance beam	Floor (gymnastics)	Total
1st place, gold medalist(s)	Alla Sosnitskaya (RUS)	14.200	14.200	14.000	13.650	56.050
2nd place, silver medalist(s)	Flávia Saraiva (BRA)	14.200	12.850	14.500	13.850	55.400
3rd place, bronze medalist(s)	Rebeca Andrade (BRA)	15.850	11.900	13.750	13.850	55.350
4	Noémi Makra (HUN)	13.900	13.850	13.350	14.050	55.150
5	Seda Tutkhalyan (RUS)	14.300	13.050	14.250	13.500	55.100
6	Ellie Downie (ENG)	15.100	13.250	13.150	13.450	54.950
7	Claudia Fragapane (ENG)	14.300	13.550	13.500	13.100	54.450

==== Vault ====
Rank	Gymnast	Total
1st place, gold medalist(s)	Rebeca Andrade (BRA)	15.100
2nd place, silver medalist(s)	Alla Sosnitskaya (RUS)	14.625
3rd place, bronze medalist(s)	Mariana Oliveira (BRA)	14.513
4	Ellie Downie (ENG)	14.375
5	Claudia Fragapane (ENG)	13.813
5	Seda Tutkhalyan (RUS)	13.813
7	Noémi Makra (HUN)	13.775
8	Argyro Afrati (GRE)	13.713

==== Uneven bars ====
Rank	Gymnast	D Score	E Score	Pen.	Total
1st place, gold medalist(s)	Noémi Makra (HUN)	5.7	8.375		14.075
2nd place, silver medalist(s)	Loan His (FRA)	5.4	8.250		13.650
3rd place, bronze medalist(s)	Ellie Downie (ENG)	5.3	8.250		13.550
3rd place, bronze medalist(s)	Farah Boufadene (FRA)	5.7	7.850		13.550
5	Alla Sosnitskaya (RUS)	5.9	7.175		13.075
6	Flávia Saraiva (BRA)	4.2	8.625		12.825
7	Claudia Fragapane (ENG)	5.2	7.125		12.325
8	Seda Tutkhalyan (RUS)	3.6	6.400		10.000

==== Balance beam ====
Rank	Gymnast	Total
1st place, gold medalist(s)	Flávia Saraiva (BRA)	14.450
2nd place, silver medalist(s)	Mariana Oliveira (BRA)	14.150
3rd place, bronze medalist(s)	Viktoria Kuzmina (RUS)	13.500
4	Seda Tutkhalyan (RUS)	13.300
5	Loan His (FRA)	13.225
6	Claudia Fragapane (ENG)	13.175
7	Georgina Hockenhull (ENG)	12.700
8	Clara Chambellant (FRA)	12.650

==== Floor exercise ====
Rank	Gymnast	Total
1st place, gold medalist(s)	Flávia Saraiva (BRA)	13.775
2nd place, silver medalist(s)	Argyro Afrati (GRE)	13.625
3rd place, bronze medalist(s)	Seda Tutkhalyan (RUS)	13.600
4	Noémi Makra (HUN)	13.550
5	Claudia Fragapane (ENG)	13.500
6	Ellie Downie (ENG)	13.475
6	Rebeca Andrade (BRA)	13.475
8	Alla Sosnitskaya (RUS)	13.050

== Overall medal table ==
Rank	Nation	Gold	Silver	Bronze	Total
1	Russia (RUS)	13	7	3	23
2	Hungary (HUN)	5	2	0	7
3	Brazil (BRA)	4	6	7	17
4	England (ENG)	2	6	6	14
5	Spain (ESP)	1	0	1	2
6	Cyprus (CYP)	1	0	0	1
7	China (CHN)	0	3	1	4
8	France (FRA)	0	1	2	3
8	Greece (GRE)	0	1	2	3
10	Chinese Taipei (TPE)	0	0	1	1
10	Finland (FIN)	0	0	1	1
Totals (11 entries)		26	26	24	76

== See also ==
- Gymnastics at the 2018 Gymnasiade
- Gymnastics at the 2022 Gymnasiade
