= Yulia Bravikova =

Russian rhythmic gymnast

Iuliia Bravikova
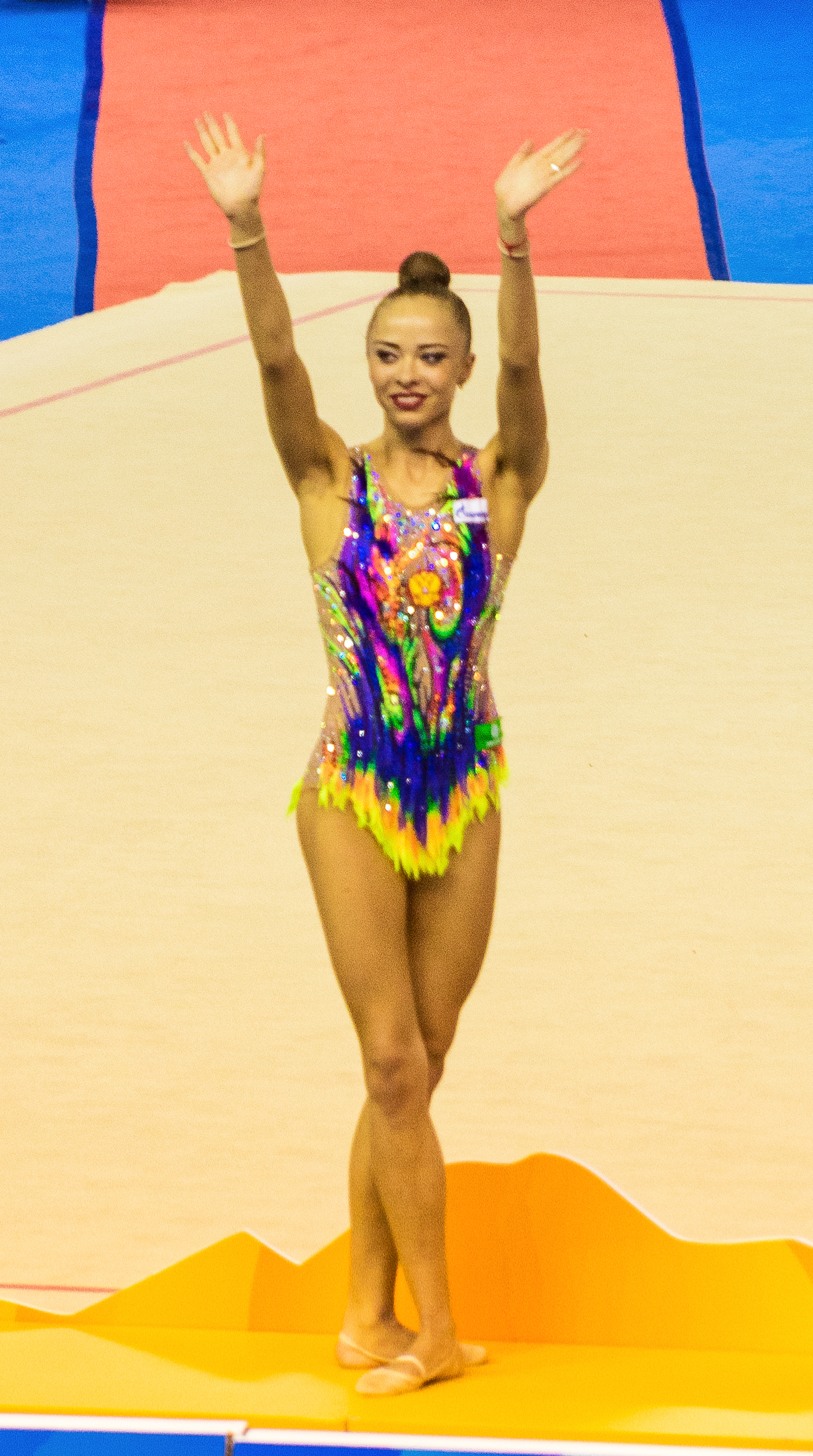
- Bravikova at the 2017 Summer Universiade

Personal information
- Full name: Yulia Yuryevna Bravikova
- Alternative name: Iuliia Iurievna Bravikova
- Nickname: Bravik
- Born: 17 July 1999 (age 27) Orel, Oryol Oblast

Gymnastics career
- Discipline: Rhythmic gymnastics
- Country represented: Russia; (2013 - 2018)
- Gym: Novogorsk
- Head coach: Irina Viner
- Assistant coach: Daria Kondakova
- Former coach: Marina Nikolaeva
- Choreographer: Veronika Shatkova
- Retired: yes
- World ranking: 2 WCC (2017 Season)
Medal record
Representing Russia
Rhythmic Gymnastics
Grand Prix Final
Gold medal – first place	2017 Eilat	All-around
Gold medal – first place	2017 Eilat	Hoop
Gold medal – first place	2017 Eilat	Ball
Gold medal – first place	2017 Eilat	Clubs
Gold medal – first place	2017 Eilat	Ribbon
Summer Universiade
Gold medal – first place	2017 Taipei	All-around
Gold medal – first place	2017 Taipei	Hoop
Gold medal – first place	2017 Taipei	Clubs
Gold medal – first place	2017 Taipei	Ribbon
Silver medal – second place	2017 Taipei	Ball
Junior European Championships
Gold medal – first place	2014 Baku	Hoop
Gold medal – first place	2014 Baku	Team
Gymnasiades
Gold medal – first place	2013 Brasília	All-Around
Gold medal – first place	2013 Brasília	Ball
Gold medal – first place	2013 Brasília	Clubs
Gold medal – first place	2013 Brasília	Ribbon
Silver medal – second place	2013 Brasília	Hoop

Yulia Yuryevna Bravikova (Russian: Юлия Юрьевна Бравикова; born 17 July 1999) is a retired Russian individual rhythmic gymnast. She is the 2017 Grand Prix Final All-around champion. On the junior level, she is the 2014 European Junior hoop champion and a two-time (2013, 2014) Russian Junior National All-around champion.

== Career ==
=== Junior ===
Bravikova began appearing in international junior competitions in the 2011 Season, she competed in her first junior nationals at the 2012 Russian Junior Championships finishing 12th in all-around behind Arina Averina. she competed in junior division at the 2012 Aeon Cup and won the silver medal in all-around behind Katsiaryna Halkina of Belarus.

In 2013 Season, Bravikova started her season winning the 2013 Russian Junior Championships scoring ahead of Aleksandra Soldatova. She won the junior all-around titles at the 2013 Moscow Grand Prix and 2013 Bucharest World Cup. On October 25–27, Bravikova competed at the World Club Championship, the 2013 Aeon Cup in Tokyo, Japan representing team Gazprom where she won the junior all-around division and (together with Senior teammates Yana Kudryavtseva and Margarita Mamun) and won the team gold. She culminated her successful season winning the junior all-around title at the 2013 Gymnasiade held in Brasília, Brazil.

In 2014 Season, Bravikova repeated as Russian Junior National champion. She won the all-around gold at the 2014 Moscow Grand Prix. She continued her success winning gold in Team and apparatus finals in the 2014 World Cup series in Debrecen, Pesaro. On June 10–16, Bravikova competed at the 2014 European Junior Championships and together with teammates (Veronika Polyakova, Irina Annenkova and Olesya Petrova) won Russia the Team gold. She qualified to 1 event final and won gold in hoop. In early July, Bravikova suffered a leg injury, she stayed in hospital was discharged 2 days later. She then was withdrawn from the entry list for Russia at the 2014 Youth Olympics and was replaced by Irina Annenkova.

=== Senior ===
In 2015, after spending last season recovering form her surgery; Bravikova appeared as Define Hors concours (Out of Competition, her scores were not counted, e.g.: appearing only for an Exhibition) at the 2015 World Cup Final in Kazan. Early of the 2016 season, Bravikova underwent another surgical operation to correct her injury rehabilitation, she returned to competition at the 2016 Russian Championships finishing 10th in the all-around. She switched coaches later in that year and began training under former World All-around silver medalist Daria Kondakova.

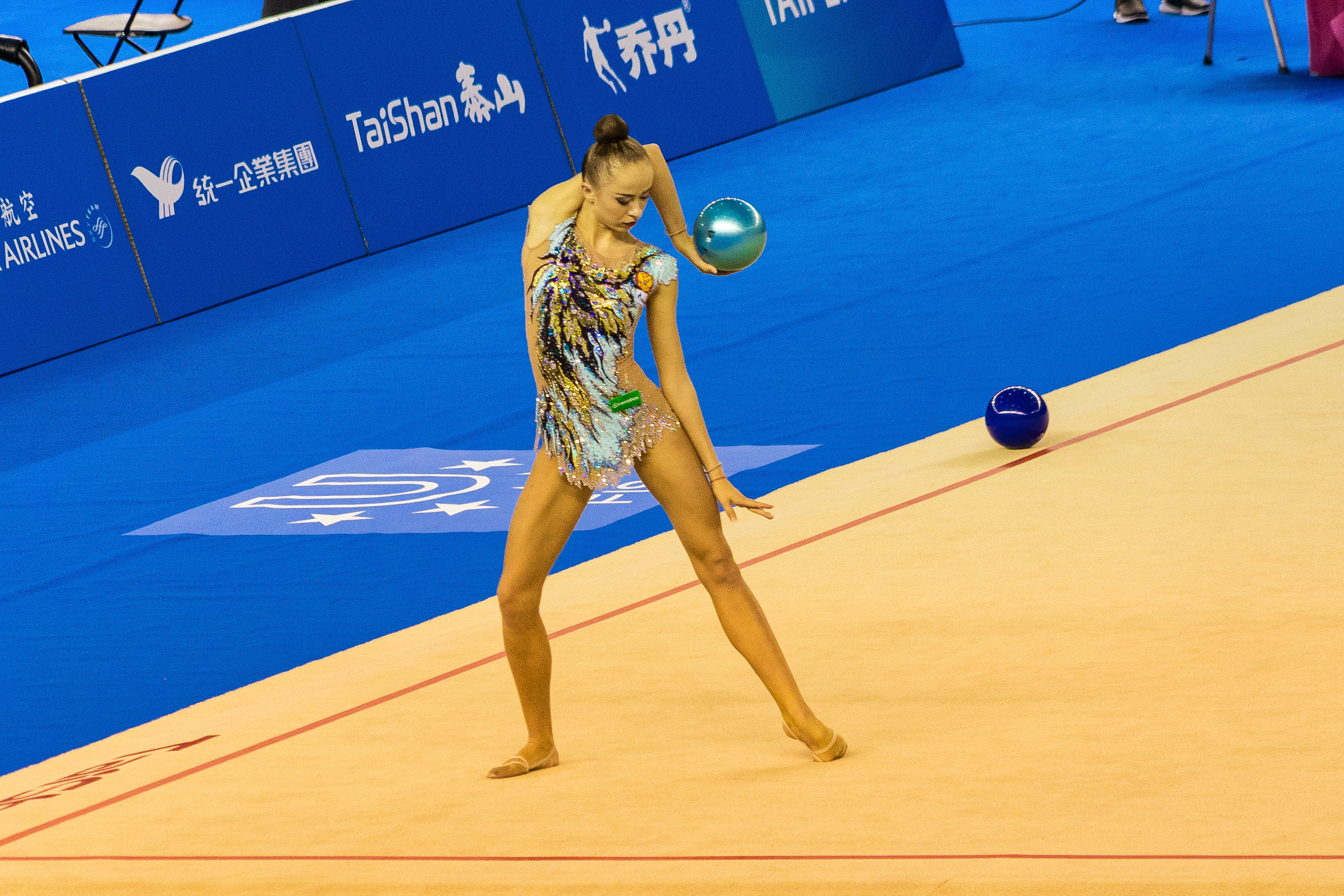
Bravikova at the 2017 Summer Universiade

In 2017 season, after struggling for 2 years with injuries, Bravikova returned to the international scene at the Grand Prix competition in Moscow finishing 7th in the all-around, she qualified to 1 apparatus final and won a silver medal in clubs behind Dina Averina. On March 10–12, Bravikova competed at the 2017 Russian Championships finishing 6th in the all-around. On March 17–19, Bravikova won the all-around silver medal at the Grand Prix Kyiv, she qualified to 3 event finals taking silver in hoop and 2 gold medals in clubs, ribbon. On her next Grand Prix, Bravikova along with teammate Dina Averina competed at the 2017 Thiais Grand Prix where she won gold in ribbon, silver in clubs, hoop and bronze in ball and in the all-around. On March 31 - April 2, Bravikova won the all-around bronze at the 2017 Grand Prix Marbella behind teammate Arina Averina, she qualified to a apparatus final taking silver in hoop and finished 8th in ribbon. On May 12–14, Bravikova competed at the 2017 Portimao World Cup where she won the all-around gold medal ahead of teammate Elizaveta Lugovskikh, she also qualified all apparatus finals taking silver medals in hoop, clubs, a bronze in ribbon and 4th in ball. On June 22–26, Bravikova competed at the 2017 Holon Grand Prix taking bronze in the all-around behind Dina Averina, she qualified to 3 apparatus finals and won gold medals in clubs, hoop and bronze in ribbon. On July 7–9, Bravikova competed at the World Challenge Cup at the 2017 World Cup Berlin where she won silver in the all-around behind Belarusian Katsiaryna Halkina. She qualified to all apparatus finals taking gold in clubs, silver in ribbon, and finished 4th in ball and hoop. On August 5–7, Bravikova finished 4th in the all-around, just out of a medal behind Belarus' Katsiaryna Halkina at the 2017 Minsk World Challenge Cup, however she qualified in 2 apparatus finals and won gold in both events. On August 9, during the control training selection process for the 2017 Summer Universiade, Bravikova and Ekaterina Selezneva were selected to represent Russia in the rhythmic gymnastics universiade participants. On August 27–29, she won the all-around gold at the 2017 Summer Universiade in Taipei, in the apparatus finals: she won gold in hoop, clubs, ribbon and silver in ball.

In 2018, Bravikova began her season at the 2018 Grand Prix Moscow, where she won all-around bronze behind the Averinas. She qualified in one apparatus final, but withdrew due to a leg injury. In November 2018, she announced her stress fracture caused retirement.

== Routine music information ==
Year	Apparatus	Music title
2018	Ball	O Fortuna by David Garrett
2018	Hoop	It's Raining Men by Geri Halliwell
2018	Clubs	Yablochko (Russian Sailor Dance) from The Red Poppy by Reinhold Glière
2018	Ribbon	The Queen of Spades, Op. 68 by Pyotr Tchaikovsky
2017	Ball	There's no me by Sevara (Там нет меня - Севара)
2017	Hoop	The Rite of Spring by Igor Stravinsky
2017	Clubs (2nd)	Summer by David Garrett
2017	Clubs (1st)	Pogonya by Yan Frenkel
2017	Ribbon	Rock This Party (Everybody Dance Now) by Bob Sinclar
2015	Ball	Concerto For Violin And Orchestra by Gidon Kremer, Christoph Von Dohnayi
2015	Hoop	?
2015	Clubs	Pogonya by Yan Frenkel
2015	Ribbon	Long Tall Sally by Cagey Strings
2014	Ball	Concerto de Berlin By Vladimir Cosma
2014	Hoop	?
2014	Clubs	Havana Coke, Laissez-Nous Passer-by Balli Di Gruppo, Danny Brillant
2014	Ribbon	Kalinka by André Rieu
2013	Ball	Flames music from Russian Gypsy Fire by Talisman
2013	Hoop	Nine - Be Italian by Fergie
2013	Clubs	Tengo Tengo (Remix)
2013	Ribbon	The Green Hornet theme by Al Hirt

== Competitive highlights ==
International: Senior
Year	Event	AA	Team	Ball	Ribbon	Hoop	Clubs
2018	Grand Prix Moscow	3rd		3rd (Q)	3rd (Q)	WD	9th (Q)
2017	Grand Prix Final	1st		1st	1st	1st	1st
2017	Grand Prix Brno	1st		1st	1st	1st	1st
2017	Aeon Cup	2nd	1st				
2017	Summer Universiade	1st		2nd	1st	1st	1st
2017	World Cup Minsk	4th		9th (Q)	1st	10th (Q)	1st
2017	World Cup Berlin	2nd		4th	2nd	4th	1st
2017	Grand Prix Holon	3rd		4th (Q)	3rd	1st	1st
2017	World Cup Portimao	1st		4th	3rd	2nd	2nd
2017	Grand Prix Marbella	3rd		4th (Q)	8th	2nd	5th (Q)
2017	Grand Prix Thiais	3rd		3rd	1st	2nd	2nd
2017	Grand Prix Kyiv	2nd		11th (Q)	1st	2nd	1st
2017	Grand Prix Moscow	7th		19th (Q)	6th (Q)	2nd	3rd (Q)
2015	World Cup Kazan	HC					
International: Junior
Year	Event	AA	Team	Ball	Ribbon	Hoop	Clubs
2014	Youth Olympic Games	WD					
2014	European Championships		1st			1st	2nd (Q)
2014	Desio Italia Cup		1st				
2014	Pesaro World Cup		1st	1st	1st		1st
2014	Grand Prix Holon		1st		1st		1st
2014	Debrecen World Cup		1st	2nd (Q)	1st		1st
2014	Grand Prix Moscow	1st					
2013	Gymnasiade	1st					
2013	Aeon Cup	1st	1st				
2013	Bucharest World Cup	1st		1st	1st	1st	1st
2013	Lisboa World Cup		1st	1st	1st	1st	1st
2013	Grand Prix Holon		1st		1st		1st
2013	Grand Prix Moscow	1st					
2012	Aeon Cup	2nd	1st				
2012	Tashkent World Cup		1st	2nd			
National
Year	Event	AA	Team	Ball	Ribbon	Hoop	Clubs
2017	Russian Championships	6th					
2016	Russian Championships	10th					
2014	Russian Junior Championships	1st					
2013	Russian Junior Championships	1st					
2012	Russian Junior Championships	12th					
Q = Qualifications (Did not advance to Event Final due to the 2 gymnast per country rule, only Top 8 highest score); WD = Withdrew; NT = No Team Competition
