= Katerina Marinova =

Bulgarian rhythmic gymnast (born 1999)

- Nickname: Katya
- Born: 13 July 1999 (age 27) Varna, Bulgaria
- Height: 164 cm (5 ft 5 in)

Gymnastics career
- Discipline: Rhythmic gymnastics
- Country represented: Bulgaria (2012 - 2014)
- Club: Char DKS Varna
- Head coach: Filipa Filipova
- Assistant coach: Filipa Filipova
- Choreographer: Sonia Manukian

Katerina Marinova (Bulgarian: Катерина Маринова, born 13 July 1999 in Varna) is a Bulgarian former rhythmic gymnast. She competed at the 2014 Youth Olympic Games.

== Personal life ==
Marinova's favorite rhythmic gymnasts are Boyanka Angelova, Evgenia Kanaeva, Ulyana Trofimova and Sylvia Miteva. She became engaged to Ilian Iliev Jr. in December 2024.

== Career ==
Marinova began training in the Grazia club as a kindergartner and had a back injury at age 6 that continued to bother her for years afterward. When she was 11, she moved clubs to Char DKS and joined the national team.

In 2013, Marinova competed in the junior division of the Grand Prix in Moscow, where she placed 7th in the all-around. At her next Grand Prix event in Brno, she finished 4th in the all-around. Domestically, she won three internal control competitions.

Marinova started the 2014 season competing in the junior division at the 2014 Moscow Grand Prix, where she finished 6th in the all-around. Next, she competed in the World Cup series in Pesaro and qualified for three of the four apparatus finals.

On 10–16 June 2014, Marinova competed at the 2014 European Junior Championships with her teammates Erika Zafirova and Boryana Kaleyn. The team finished fourth, and Marinova qualified for three event finals, placing 4th in hoop and clubs and 6th in ribbon. Her next event was the junior event at the Sofia World Cup, where she finished 5th in the all-around and won bronze in the team event with Kaleyn.

Marinova had lower back issues in early August, but she went on to represent Bulgaria at the 2014 Youth Olympic Games in Nanjing, China. A shaky performance left Marinova out of advancing into the top 8 finals after she placed only 9th in qualifications.

She announced her retirement in April 2015 due to an injury to her cruciate ligament.
