= Nicoleta Dulgheru =

Moldovan rhythmic gymnast

- Born: 16 March 1999 (age 27) Chișinău, Moldova

Gymnastics career
- Discipline: Rhythmic gymnastics
- Country represented: Moldova
- Club: Speranta
- Head coach: Maia Nicolaeva
- Assistant coach: Maria Leushchina

Nicoleta Dulgheru (born March 16, 1999) is a Moldovan rhythmic gymnast. She is the three-time Moldovan Junior National champion.

== Personal life ==
Dulgheru started gymnastics at 6 years old, she attends public school.

== Career ==
=== Junior ===
Dulgheru appeared in international competitions in 2011, she appeared in the junior division at the 2012 Moscow Grand Prix, She competed at the 2012 European Championships where she qualified to ball finals finishing in 8th place. In 2013, Dulgheru started her season competing at the Moscow Grand Prix, she competed in the junior division of the World Cup series, in the 2013 World Cup in St.Petersburg, she won the all-around silver medal. She won bronze in all-around at the Junior Grand Prix in Brno, Czech Republic.

In 2014, Dulgheru competed at the 2014 Moscow Grand Prix finishing 10th in the all-around behind Linoy Ashram, following her placement she earned a qualification for Moldova to compete for the Youth Olympic Games. Dulgheru competed in the World Cup series. On 10–16 June, Dulgheru's competition at the 2014 European Junior Championships placed Moldova in 15th at Team event. Dulgheru went to represent Moldova at the 2014 Youth Olympic Games in Nanjing, China where she qualified for the finals and finished 7th in all-around. In November, Duilgheru won the all-around silver medal at the 2014 JGP Final in Innsbruck, Austria.

=== Senior ===
In 2015 season, Dulgheru made her senior international debut competing at the 2015 Moscow Grand Prix finishing 36th in the all-around. Dulgheru then competed at the 2015 Holon Grand Prix finishing 23rd in all-around. She competed in her first Europeans at the 2015 European Championships in Minsk, Belarus. In November, Dulgheru won the All-around silver at the 2015 Happy Cup in Asker, Norway behind Israel's Linoy Ashram.
