= Ana Luiza Filiorianu =

Romanian rhythmic gymnast (born 1999)

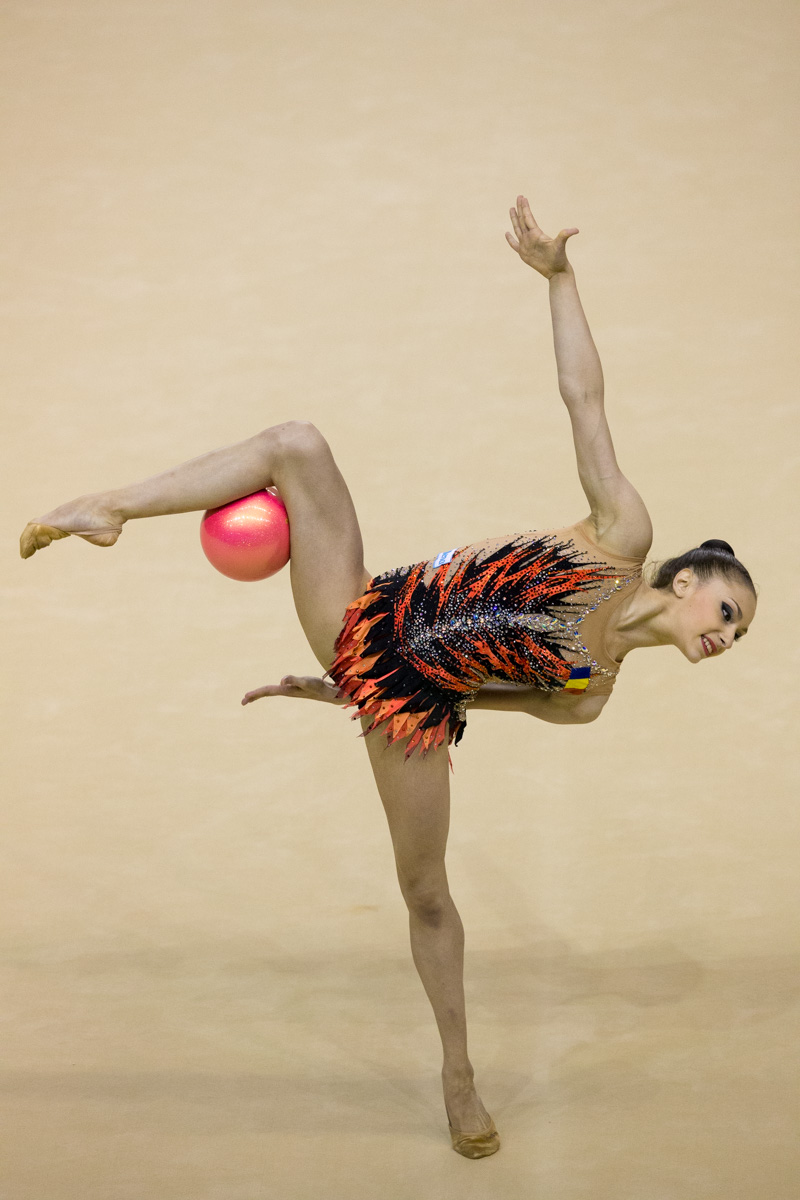
- Filiorianu in 2016

Personal information
- Nickname: Lizi
- Born: July 10, 1999 (age 27) Bucharest, Romania
- Height: 169 cm (5 ft 7 in)

Gymnastics career
- Discipline: Rhythmic gymnastics
- Country represented: Romania; (2011–2019)
- Club: CSA Steaua
- Head coach: Maria Girba
- Choreographer: Anca Iorga
- World ranking: 17 WC 26 WCC (2017 season); 35 (2016 season)
Medal record
Representing Romania
Rhythmic gymnastics

Ana Luiza Filiorianu (born July 10, 1999) is a Romanian individual rhythmic gymnast. She is the six-time (2011–14 and 2016–17) Romanian National all-around champion.

== Personal life ==
Filiorianu started competitive gymnastics in 2006 at seven years old. Her sports hero is Romanian artistic gymnast Nadia Comăneci, the first female gymnast to score perfect 10's in the Olympic Games.

She attended the National University of Physical Education and Sport; she studied both law and for a Master's in physical education and sport. Her dissertation centered on ethical behavior in physical education.

In January 2025, Filiorianu was one of several Romanian rhythmic gymnasts who came forward with allegations of abuse from coaches. She alleged that she was physically and mentally abused, including repeatedly being insulted for her appearance and told that she had no work ethic.

== Career ==
=== Junior ===
Filiorianu debuted in international competitions in 2011. She competed at the 2013 Moscow Grand Prix where she finished 9th in the all-around. She competed in the junior division of the World Cup series at the 2013 Lisboa World Cup and 2013 Bucharest World Cup, finishing 5th in the all-around.

In 2014, Filiorianu started her season by competing at the Miss Valentine Cup in Tartu, Estonia. There she won three golds in ball, clubs and ribbon and a bronze with hoop. She then competed at the 2014 Moscow Grand Prix finishing 8th in the all-around, following her placement she earned a qualification for Romania to compete for the Youth Olympic Games.

Filiorianu competed in the World Cup in Debrecen, qualifying to two event finals; she won silver in hoop and bronze with ball. Her next event was the Pesaro World Cup. She won the all-around gold at the Irina Deleanu Cup.

On June 10–16, Filiorianu competed at the 2014 European Junior Championships and qualified to two event finals, where she placed 5th in clubs and 7th in hoop. At the national championships, she won her third all-around national title.

Filiorianu went on to represent Romania at the 2014 Youth Olympic Games in Nanjing, China, where she finished 4th in the all-around finals behind America's Laura Zeng.

=== Senior ===
In 2015, Filiorianu made her senior international debut competing at the 2015 Moscow Grand Prix, where she finished 23rd in the all-around. On April 10–12, she finished 45th in the all-around at the 2015 Pesaro World Cup. On June 15–21, she competed at the inaugural 2015 European Games, where she finished 18th in the all-around. In August, she finished 35th in the all-around at the 2015 Budapest World Cup and 22nd at the 2015 Sofia World Cup.

On September 9–13, Filiorianu competed at the 2015 World Championships in Stuttgart. She finished 37th in the all-around qualifications and did not advance into the finals.

In 2016, Filiorianu started her season competing at the 2016 Gracia Cup in Budapest and finished 2nd in the all-around. She qualified to all four event finals and won silver with hoop and bronze with clubs and ribbon, and she placed fourth with ball. On February 17–22, she competed at the 2016 Grand Prix Moscow, finishing 19th in the all-around with a total of 66.916 points.

On March 17–20, Filiorianu then competed at the 2016 Lisboa World Cup, where she finished 15th in the all-around. On April 1–3, she competed at the 2016 Pesaro World Cup, where she finished 20th in the all-around with a total of 69.050 points. On April 21–22, Filiorianu won an Olympics quota by finishing sixth among the gymnasts not already qualified at the 2016 Gymnastics Olympic Test Event held in Rio de Janeiro.

On May 13–15, Filiorianu finished 7th in the all-around at the 2016 Grand Prix Bucharest behind Israel's Victoria Veinberg Filanovsky with a new personal best score. Later that month, she finished 10th in the all-around at the 2016 Sofia World Cup with a total of 69.250 points. On July 8–10, she finished 22nd in the all-around at the 2016 Kazan World Cup.

In August, Filiorianu competed at the 2016 Summer Olympics held in Rio de Janeiro, Brazil. She finished 22nd in the rhythmic gymnastics individual all-around qualifications and did not advance into the top 10 finals. In September, she finished her season at the 2016 Grand Prix Final in Eilat, where she finished 8th in the all-around with a total of 67.683 points.

For the 2017 season, Filiorianu debuted her new routines at the 2017 Grand Prix Moscow, finishing 12th in the all-around and qualifying to the ball final. On March 17–19, she competed at the Kyiv Grand Prix, finishing 8th in the all-around and qualifying four all event finals. In August, she competed at the 2017 Pesaro World Cup, where she was 15th in the all-around and qualified for the ball final. Her next competition was the 2017 Baku World Cup, where she finished 7th in the all-around and qualified for the ball and clubs finals.

On May 5–7, she competed at the 2017 Sofia World Cup and finished 14th in the all-around. On July 7–9, she finished 8th in the all-around at the 2017 Berlin World Challenge Cup and qualified for the clubs and ribbon finals. On August 11–13, she competed at the 2017 Kazan World Challenge Cup, finishing 17th in the all-around behind Italy's Veronica Bertolini.

She competed at the 2017 World Championships in Pesaro, Italy; she qualified for the all-around final, where she finished 14th, but she did not advance into any apparatus finals.

In 2018, Filiorianu began the season by competing at the 2018 Sofia World Cup, finishing 23rd in the all-around. She then competed at the 2018 Pesaro World Cup, where she placed 16th in the all-around. In late April, she competed at the 2018 Baku World Cup, where she had her highest all-around placement, finishing in 6th behind American Laura Zeng. She also qualified for two apparatus finals.

On May 4–6, Filiorianu competed at the 2018 Guadalajara World Cup. There she suffered a knee injury during her ball routine; she twisted her knee after falling from a backscale pivot, and she was then assisted by paramedics and withdrawn from competition. Filiorianu later alleged that her coaches said she was struggling to get up after her injury because she was "fat", although she was in a significant amount of pain from her injury. On May 17 she had a knee reconstruction surgery and one month later started recovery. She started training again in mid-July, but she had another surgery at the end of November.

In the 2019 season Filiorianu entered the competition floor again for the first time after her accident on February 10 in Bologna, during the Serie A domestic league in Italy. She competed for the Italian club AS Udinese, which finished in third place. She competed for AS Udinese two more times. On February 23, the team won silver, and on March 16, the team won bronze. They finished the league in third place overall. From 29 to 31 March Filiorianu competed in the Irina Deleanu Trophy, where she placed fourth in the all-around. She also qualified for the hoop and ribbon finals, where she won two bronze medals.

Filiorianu retired in 2019 after having disagreements with the national federation.

== Routine music ==
Year	Apparatus	Music title
2017	Hoop	You're X-Men/End Titles by John Ottman
2017	Ball	Dernière Danse by Indila
2017	Clubs	Dirty Diana by Michael Jackson
2017	Ribbon	Waves (Chilly Gonzales Piano Remake) by Erol Alkan, Boys Noize
2016	Hoop	Concerto de Berlin by Vladimir Cosma
2016	Ball	Run by Ludovico Einaudi
2016	Clubs	Gimme Gimme Gimme/ Summer Night City by Royal Philharmonic Orchestra
2016	Ribbon	Magnifica Presenze by Orchestra directed by Catalano & Giuseppe Sasso
2015	Hoop	False Awakening Suite by Dream Theater
2015	Ball	Run by Ludovico Einaudi
2015	Clubs	Gimme Gimme Gimme/ Summer Night City by Royal Philharmonic Orchestra
2015	Ribbon 1st	And The Waltz Goes On by André Rieu
2015	Ribbon 2nd	The Borgia Season 2 – Main Titles from The Borgias soundtrack by Eric Neveux
2014	Hoop	Devil and Angel/Guerilleros by Maxime Rodriguez
2014	Ball	30 Minutes by t.A.T.u.
2014	Clubs	Rise Of The Warriors by audiomachine
2014	Ribbon	Dark Angel by Edvin Marton
2013	Hoop	Devil and Angel/Guerilleros by Maxime Rodriguez
2013	Ball	Once Upon A December from Anastasia by Liz Callaway
2013	Clubs	Rise Of The Warriors by audiomachine
2013	Ribbon	Dark Angel by Edvin Marton
