= Diana Borisova =

Russian group rhythmic gymnast

- Full name: Diana Konstantinovna Borisova
- Born: 21 March 1997 (age 29) Kemerovo, Russia
- Height: 178 cm (5 ft 10 in)

Gymnastics career
- Discipline: Rhythmic gymnastics
- Country represented: Russia (2008 - 2016)
- Head coach: Irina Viner
- Assistant coach: Vera Shatalina
- Former coach: Marina Kaliuzhnaya
- Retired: 2016
Medal record
Representing Russia
Group Rhythmic Gymnastics
World Championships
Gold medal – first place	2014 Izmir	3 Balls + 2 Ribbons
Gold medal – first place	2015 Stuttgart	Group All-around
Gold medal – first place	2015 Stuttgart	6 Clubs + 2 Hoops
Silver medal – second place	2015 Stuttgart	5 Ribbons
European Games
Gold medal – first place	2015 Baku	Group All-Around
Gold medal – first place	2015 Baku	5 Ribbons
European Championships
Gold medal – first place	2014 Baku	Group All-around
Gold medal – first place	2014 Baku	3 Balls + 2 Ribbons
Silver medal – second place	2014 Baku	10 Clubs
Junior European Championships
Gold medal – first place	2012 Nizhny Novgorod	Team
Gold medal – first place	2012 Nizhny Novgorod	Hoop

Diana Konstantinovna Borisova (Russian: Диана Константиновна Борисова; born 21 March 1997) is a retired Russian group rhythmic gymnast. She is the 2015 Worlds Group all-around champion, the 2015 European Games Group All-around champion and the 2012 European Junior Hoop champion.

== Career ==
=== Junior ===
A member of the Russian national team since 2008, Borisova started as an individual gymnast. Her first coach was Marina Kaliuzhnaya. Starting in 2009, she was coached by Vera Shatalina who also trained Dina Averina, Arina Averina and former Olympians Yulia Barsukova and Olga Kapranova. She won the silver in all-around at the 2011 Russian Junior Championships.

Borsiova had a successful junior career winning numerous medals including gold medal in hoop at the 2012 Pesaro and 2012 Kyiv Junior World Cup. She took silver in clubs at the 2010 Pesaro Junior World Cup. At the 2012 European Junior Championships, Borisova won the gold medals in hoop and with the Russian junior team (Yana Kudryavtseva, Julia Sinitsina and Aleksandra Soldatova).

=== Senior ===
Borisova debuted as a Senior in the 2013 season, she finished 7th in all-around at the 2013 Russian Championships. She later began training as a Group rhythmic gymnast and became a member of the Russian National group, replacing injured gymnast Alina Makarenko. Borisova began competing with the Russian Group at the 2013 World Cup series.

In 2014 season, Borisova was member of the Russian Group at the 2014 European Championships in Baku, Azerbaijan where they won gold in Group all-around, 2Ribbon / 3Balls and silver in 10 Clubs. At the 2014 World Championships, the Russian Group finished 4th in all-around and took gold in 2Ribbon / 3Balls.

In 2015, Borisova missed the early part of the season due to an ankle injury. She returned to competition at the 2015 Pesaro World Cup. Borisova was member of the Group that competed at the inaugural 2015 European Games held in Baku, Azerbaijan where they won gold in Group All-around and 5 Ribbons. At the 2015 World Cup Budapest, Borisova with the Russian Group won gold in Group all-around, 5 Ribbons and bronze in 6 clubs/2 Hoops. At the 2015 World Cup series in Kazan, Borisova together with members of the Russian Group won the gold medal in Group all-around. In event finals, they also won gold in 5 ribbons and 6 clubs + 2 hoops. On September 9–13, Borisova together with other members of Russian Group ( Sofya Skomorokh, Daria Kleshcheva, Anastasia Maksimova, Anastasiia Tatareva and Maria Tolkacheva ) competed at the 2015 World Championships in Stuttgart where they won the Group all-around title. It had been eight years since the Russian Group last won the all-around title in 2007. In apparatus finals, Borisova was a member of the group that won silver in 5 Ribbons.

She finished her gymnastics career in 2016.
