= Mariya Trubach =

Belarusian rhythmic gymnast

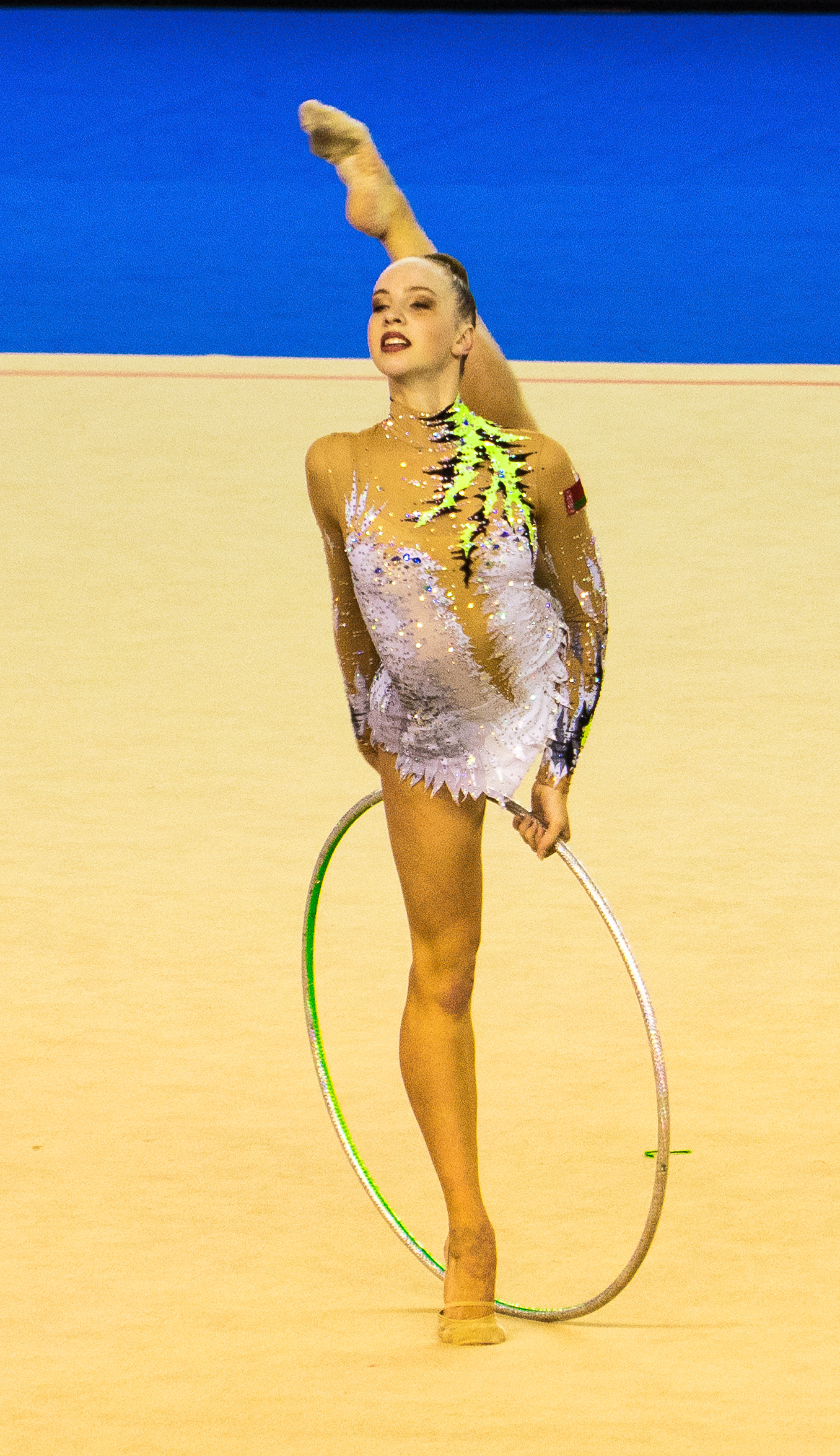
- Trubach at the 2017 Summer Universiade

Personal information
- Full name: Mariya Yuryevna Trubach
- Nickname: Masha Trubach
- Born: November 15, 1999 (age 26) Vitebsk, Vitebsk Oblast, Belarus

Gymnastics career
- Discipline: Rhythmic gymnastics
- Country represented: Belarus
- Gym: Burlo Gymnastics
- Head coach: Irina Leparskaya
- Assistant coach: Iryna Ilienkova
Medal record
Representing Belarus
Rhythmic Gymnastics
Summer Universiade
Bronze medal – third place	2017 Taipei	Ball
Youth Olympic Games
Silver medal – second place	2014 Nanjing	All-around
Junior European Championships
Silver medal – second place	2014 Baku	Ball
Silver medal – second place	2014 Baku	Clubs
Silver medal – second place	2014 Baku	Team

Mariya Yuryevna Trubach (Belarusian: Марыя Юр'еўна Трубач; Russian: Мария Юрьевна Трубач, born November 11, 1999, in Vitebsk, Belarus) is a Belarusian individual rhythmic gymnast. She is the 2014 Youth Olympic all-around silver medalist and two-time (2013, 2014) Junior National champion.

== Personal life ==
Trubach was inspired to take up rhythmic gymnastics after watching Inna Zhukova in television, which she then asked her mother to take her to a gymnastics class.

== Career ==
=== Junior ===
Trubach began appearing in international competitions in 2011. In 2013 season, Trubach competed in the junior division of the World Cup and Grand Prix series.

She won the all-around bronze at the 2014 Moscow Grand Prix, following her placement she earned a qualification for Belarus to compete for the Youth Olympic Games. Trubach competed in the World Cup series in Lisbon winning gold in clubs, 2 silver (hoop, ribbon). On June 10–16, 2014, Trubach competed at the 2014 European Junior Championships and together with teammates (Anastasiya Rybakova, and Stefaniya-Sofiya Manakhava) won Belarus the Team silver medal. She qualified to 2 event finals taking silver medal in ball and clubs. Trubach then competed at the Junior World Cup in Sofia where she won the all-around bronze medal behind Russian Veronika Polyakova. Trubach was selected as the representative of Belarus at the 2014 Youth Olympic Games in Nanjing, China, she went on to take the all-around silver medal in the finals ahead of America's Laura Zeng. On October 17–19, Trubach traveled in Tokyo for the 2014 Aeon Cup, representing team Dinamo club (together with senior teammates Melitina Staniouta and Katsiaryna Halkina) won the team silver. She won the All-around silver medal behind Russia's Veronika Polyakova. Trubach won the all-around gold at the 2014 Grand Prix Brno.

=== Senior ===
In 2016 Season, Trubach made her senior international debut at the L.A. Lights. Trubach finished 5th in all-around at the 2016 Corbeil-Essonnes International Tournament. In 2017, Trubach competed at the 2017 Corbeil-Essonnes Tournament finishing 7th in all-around and qualified to 3 apparatus finals. On June 23–25, Trubach competed at the International Tournament of Holon finishing 4th in the all-around behind Kateryna Lutsenko. On August 27–29, Trubach competed at the 2017 Summer Universiade where she finished 5th in the all-around behind Kateryna Lutsenko, she qualified in 3 apparatus finals and won a bronze medal in ball, finished 4th in clubs, and 5th in hoop.

After her retirement Trubach works as a coach at Burlo Gymnastics in California.
