= 2014 Rhythmic Gymnastics European Championships =

- Venue: National Gymnastics Arena
- Location: Baku, Azerbaijan
- Start date: 10 June 2014
- End date: 15 June 2014
- Nations: 33 members of the European Union of Gymnastics

The 30th Rhythmic Gymnastics European Championships took place from June 10 to June 15, 2014 at the then newly opened National Gymnastics Arena in Baku, Azerbaijan. 33 participating federations with their juniors and seniors gymnasts participated at the event.

== Participating countries ==
List of delegations participating in Championship.

- Andorra
- Austria
- Azerbaijan
- Belarus
- Belgium
- Bulgaria
- Croatia
- Cyprus
- Czech Republic
- Estonia
- Finland
- France
- Georgia
- Germany
- Greece
- Hungary
- Israel
- Italy
- Latvia
- Lithuania
- Moldova
- Norway
- Poland
- Portugal
- Romania
- Russia
- Serbia
- Slovakia
- Slovenia
- Spain
- Switzerland
- Turkey
- Ukraine

== Schedule ==
- Wednesday, June 11
  - 08h00 - 22h00 Official Training
  - 18h00 Briefing session with the Heads of delegation
- Thursday, June 12
  - 08h00 - 22h00 Official Training
- Friday, June 13
  - 09h30 - 11h15 C I - Juniors, Group A - Hoop + Ball
  - 11h50 - 13h50 C I - Juniors, Group B - Hoop + Ball
  - 14h45 - 16h30 C I - Juniors, Group C - Hoop + Ball
  - 17h00 - 17h55 Opening Ceremony
  - 17h55 - 20h45 C I - Seniors groups alternating 10 Clubs / 3 Balls - 2 Ribbons
  - 20h45 Award Ceremony - Seniors group all-around competition I
- Saturday, June 14
  - 09h30 - 11h30 C I - Juniors, Group B - clubs + ribbon
  - 11h50 - 13h50 C I - Juniors, Group C - clubs + ribbon
  - 14h30 - 16 h 30 C I - Juniors, Group A - clubs + ribbon
  - 16h30 - 17h00 Award Ceremony - Junior Team competition I
  - 17h00 - 19h00 C II - Seniors, Group B - 4 apparatus (place 11 to 20 from ECh 2013)
  - 19h15 - 21h15 C II - Seniors, Group A - 4 apparatus (place 01 to 10 from ECh 2013)
  - 21h15 Award Ceremony - Senior individual all-around competition II
- Sunday, June 15
  - 12h00 - 13h00 Competition III - Juniors - Hoop and Ball
  - 13h00 - 14h00 Competition III - Juniors - Clubs and Ribbon
  - 14h30 - 16h20 Competition III - Senior groups - 10 Clubs, 3 Balls and 2 Ribbons
  - 16h30 Gala and Closing Ceremony

== Overview ==
The 20 best senior individuals from 2013 will compete at the multiple competition (CII).

102 juniors (from 32 NF) will participate in the qualifying competition I (CI) and team competition and the final competition (4 apparatus) (CIII), 21 senior groups (consisted of 6 gymnasts) will present two different voluntary exercises, one executed with one apparatus (clubs), the other with different apparatus (3 balls/2 ribbons) on the occasion of the competition I (general competition) and the competition III (final competition for each exercise). At the European Championships in even years, the 20 best gymnasts from competition I of the previous year present their routines.

== Controversies ==
According to Armenian sources, the organizers of the European Championships in Rhythmic Gymnastics in Baku asked the Belarusian group to not use the music of Armenian composer Aram Khachaturian, which was reported by head coach Irina Leparskaya at a press conference in Minsk. The group had been performing their 2 Ribbons + 3 Balls routine with Khachaturian's "Sabre Dance", but they had to change to different music two weeks before the start of the Championships event. Spokeswoman for the Ministry of Youth and Sports of Azerbaijan Samaya Mamedova said they did not interfere in any federation's music decisions:

Regarding Belarus, we didn't ask them to abandon their music. This decision was taken by Belarus itself. This is another provocative piece of information spread by Armenians to tarnish Azerbaijan as organizer of the European Championships of Rhythmic Gymnastics.

The Belarusian group, usually medal contenders, finished 17th in the all-around and placed last with their 2 Ribbons + 3 Balls qualification score amongst 21 countries during the European Championships. Armenia did not compete or send any delegations to the championships.

== Medal winners ==
Event	Gold	Silver	Bronze
Senior Individual Finals
All-around	Yana Kudryavtseva; Russia	Melitina Staniouta; Belarus	Ganna Rizatdinova; Ukraine
Senior Group Finals
All-around	Russia; Anastasia Maksimova; Aleksandra Semenova; Diana Borisova; Anastasiia Tatareva; Maria Tolkacheva; Daria Avtonomova	Italy; Sofia Lodi; Marta Pagnini; Camilla Patriarca; Valeria Schiavi; Andreea Stefanescu	Israel; Alona Koshevatskiy; Ekaterina Levina; Karina Lykhvar; Ida Mayrin; Lihi Shochatovitch; Yuval Filo
10 clubs	Bulgaria; Reneta Kamberova; Tsvetelina Stoyanova; Tsvetelina Naydenova; Hristiana Todorova; Mihaela Maevska-Velichkova	Russia; Anastasia Maksimova; Aleksandra Semenova; Diana Borisova; Anastasiia Tatareva; Daria Avtonomova	Spain; Alejandra Quereda; Sandra Aguilar; Artemi Gavezou; Elena Lopez; Lourdes Mohedano
3 balls + 2 ribbons	Russia; Anastasia Maksimova; Aleksandra Semenova; Diana Borisova; Maria Tolkacheva; Daria Avtonomova	Azerbaijan; Aliya Pashayeva; Siyana Vasileva; Diana Doman; Aliaksandra Platonova; Aynur Mustafayeva	Bulgaria; Reneta Kamberova; Tsvetelina Stoyanova; Tsvetelina Naydenova; Hristiana Todorova; Mihaela Maevska-Velichkova
Junior Finals
Team	Russia; Yulia Bravikova; Irina Annenkova; Olesya Petrova; Veronika Polyakova	Belarus; Mariya Trubach; Stefaniya-Sofiya Manakhava; Anastasiya Rybakova	Azerbaijan; Zhala Piriyeva; Zuleykha Ismayilova
Hoop	Yulia Bravikova; Russia	Zhala Piriyeva; Azerbaijan	Anastasiya Rybakova; Belarus
Ball	Irina Annenkova; Russia	Mariya Trubach; Belarus	Boryana Kaleyn; Bulgaria
Clubs	Olesya Petrova; Russia	Mariya Trubach; Belarus	Linoy Ashram; Israel
Ribbon	Irina Annenkova; Russia	Valeriya Khanina; Ukraine	Linoy Ashram; Israel

== Results ==
=== Seniors ===
==== Individual all-around ====
Rank	Gymnast	Nation	Hoop (rhythmic gymnastics)	Ball (rhythmic gymnastics)	Clubs (rhythmic gymnastics)	Ribbon (rhythmic gymnastics)	Total
1st place, gold medalist(s)	Yana Kudryavtseva	Russia	18.700	17.433	18.800	18.566	73.499
2nd place, silver medalist(s)	Melitina Staniouta	Belarus	18.266	18.200	17.850	18.100	72.416
3rd place, bronze medalist(s)	Ganna Rizatdinova	Ukraine	18.083	18.066	18.000	17.500	71.649
4	Neta Rivkin	Israel	17.950	17.816	18.033	17.800	71.599
5	Margarita Mamun	Russia	16.000	18.466	16.716	18.533	69.715
6	Marina Durunda	Azerbaijan	17.733	17.566	16.950	17.425	69.674
7	Katsiaryna Halkina	Belarus	17.366	17.283	17.100	17.266	69.015
8	Kseniya Moustafaeva	France	17.025	17.600	17.600	16.550	68.775
9	Salome Phajava	Georgia	16.850	16.833	17.400	17.233	68.316
10	Carolina Rodriguez	Spain	16.783	17.050	16.833	16.766	67.432
11	Mariya Mateva	Bulgaria	17.033	16.675	16.950	16.766	67.424
12	Victoria Veinberg Filanovsky	Israel	17.066	16.816	17.033	16.183	67.098
13	Neviana Vladinova	Bulgaria	17.150	16.866	16.616	16.416	67.048
14	Viktoria Mazur	Ukraine	15.983	17.233	16.416	16.950	66.582
15	Gulsum Shafizada	Azerbaijan	17.000	16.033	16.500	16.883	66.416
16	Varvara Filiou	Greece	15.366	17.266	17.116	16.433	66.181
17	Nicol Ruprecht	Austria	16.800	16.333	16.050	16.600	65.783
18	Alexandra Piscupescu	Romania	14.725	16.025	16.266	16.900	63.916
19	Dora Vass	Hungary	15.666	16.016	15.900	14.791	62.373
20	Natascha Wegscheider	Austria	15.825	15.266	15.858	14.625	61.574

==== Group all-around ====
Rank	Nation	Clubs (rhythmic gymnastics)	Ball (rhythmic gymnastics) Ribbon (rhythmic gymnastics)	Total
1st place, gold medalist(s)	Russia	18.366	18.200	36.566
2nd place, silver medalist(s)	Italy	17.366	17.383	34.749
3rd place, bronze medalist(s)	Israel	17.333	17.050	34.383
4	Bulgaria	17.666	16.633	34.299
5	Spain	17.358	16.733	34.091
6	Azerbaijan	17.350	16.700	34.050
7	France	16.566	16.516	33.082
8	Ukraine	16.033	16.850	32.883
9	Switzerland	16.566	15.750	32.316
10	Greece	16.666	15.233	31.899
11	Germany	16.700	15.041	31.741
12	Finland	16.016	15.575	31.591
13	Latvia	15.533	14.133	29.666
14	Poland	15.708	13.325	29.033
15	Hungary	14.325	14.475	28.800
16	Czech Republic	14.783	13.075	27.858
17	Belarus	17.400	10.400	27.800
18	Austria	13.850	13.916	27.766
19	Turkey	14.525	12.716	27.241
20	Portugal	14.333	12.750	27.083
21	Slovakia	13.566	12.816	26.382

==== Group 10 clubs ====
Rank	Nation	D Score	E Score	Pen.	Total
1st place, gold medalist(s)	Bulgaria	8.900	8.866		17.766
2nd place, silver medalist(s)	Russia	8.900	8.733		17.633
3rd place, bronze medalist(s)	Spain	8.850	8.700		17.550
4	Belarus	8.850	8.633		17.483
5	Italy	8.800	8.633		17.433
6	Azerbaijan	8.600	8.566		17.166
7	Israel	8.550	7.833		16.383
8	Germany	8.000	7.700	0.60	15.100

==== Group 3 balls + 2 ribbons ====
Rank	Nation	D Score	E Score	Pen.	Total
1st place, gold medalist(s)	Russia	9.100	9.266		18.366
2nd place, silver medalist(s)	Azerbaijan	8.650	9.000		17.650
3rd place, bronze medalist(s)	Bulgaria	8.850	8.733		17.583
4	Israel	8.700	8.800		17.500
5	Spain	8.700	8.700		17.400
6	Italy	8.800	8.533	0.05	17.283
7	France	8.200	7.833	0.30	15.733
8	Ukraine	7.900	5.800	0.60	13.100

=== Juniors ===
==== Team ====
Rank	Nation	Hoop (rhythmic gymnastics)	Ball (rhythmic gymnastics)	Clubs (rhythmic gymnastics)	Ribbon (rhythmic gymnastics)	Total
1st place, gold medalist(s)	Russia	30.233	32.133	31.866	32.133	96.815
2nd place, silver medalist(s)	Belarus	31.441	31.482	31.750	29.991	94.915
3rd place, bronze medalist(s)	Azerbaijan	31.182	30.632	31.174	31.649	94.364
4	Bulgaria	30.732	30.350	26.750	28.524	91.348
5	Ukraine	30.033	29.391	29.300	29.483	89.182
6	Italy	29.157	29.833	26.774	29.375	89.123
7	Israel	28.249	28.649	28.474	25.050	87.189
8	Finland	27.941	29.316	29.100	28.300	86.766
9	Greece	28.300	26.949	27.350	29.408	86.741
10	Romania	28.141	26.049	28.900	28.183	85.849
11	Hungary	27.132	28.191	29.116	27.316	85.373
12	Estonia	27.600	26.450	28.599	27.241	83.440
13	Belgium	27.282	27.616	27.557	26.407	83.430
14	Georgia	28.600	25.466	27.500	26.800	82.900
15	Moldova	26.558	26.857	28.066	25.199	82.781
16	Poland	24.733	26.407	27.341	28.100	81.848
17	Latvia	27.049	26.557	27.275	26.949	81.581
18	Germany	27.416	26.033	27.658	26.175	81.449
19	Turkey	26.383	26.499	26.783	26.533	81.215
20	France	25.566	24.241	27.516	28.007	81.089
21	Czech Republic	26.382	24.524	7.166	27.449	80.997
22	Spain	27.391	26.233	24.666	24.741	78.907
23	Slovenia	24.875	25.766	25.283	26.375	78.341
24	Cyprus	26.124	23.633	26.599	23.691	77.697
25	Lithuania	25.191	23.416	26.366	25.800	77.357
26	Austria	25.325	24.075	25.850	24.749	76.016
27	Slovakia	24.524	22.958	24.150	23.600	73.807
28	Portugal	23.299	23.616	24.574	24.366	73.281
29	Serbia	23.774	22.708	24.008	22.858	71.557
30	Croatia	23.658	23.632	21.875	23.608	70.907
31	Norway	22.716	24.216	23.291	20.649	70.273
32	Andorra	21.049	18.441	18.174	18.208	58.189

==== Hoop ====
Rank	Gymnast	Nation	D Score	E Score	Pen.	Total
1st place, gold medalist(s)	Yulia Bravikova	Russia	7.550	9.200		16.750
2nd place, silver medalist(s)	Zhala Piriyeva	Azerbaijan	7.350	9.000	0.05	16.300
3rd place, bronze medalist(s)	Anastasiya Rybakova	Belarus	7.050	8.725		15.775
4	Katerina Marinova	Bulgaria	7.000	8.700		15.700
5	Linoy Ashram	Israel	7.025	8.633		15.658
6	Mariia Mulyk	Ukraine	6.800	8.500		15.300
7	Ana Luiza Filiorianu	Romania	6.700	8.500		15.200
8	Eleni Kelaiditi	Greece	6.250	8.000	0.30	13.950

==== Ball ====
Rank	Gymnast	Nation	D Score	E Score	Pen.	Total
1st place, gold medalist(s)	Irina Annenkova	Russia	7.300	9.000		16.300
2nd place, silver medalist(s)	Mariya Trubach	Belarus	7.150	8.866		16.016
3rd place, bronze medalist(s)	Boryana Kaleyn	Bulgaria	7.150	8.800		15.950
4	Linoy Ashram	Israel	7.150	8.666		15.816
5	Valeriya Khanina	Ukraine	6.800	8.666		15.466
6	Letizia Cicconcelli	Italy	6.850	8.600		15.450
7	Zhala Piriyeva	Azerbaijan	6.800	8.500	0.05	15.250
8	Eleni Kelaiditi	Greece	6.500	8.175		14.675

==== Clubs ====
Rank	Gymnast	Nation	D Score	E Score	Pen.	Total
1st place, gold medalist(s)	Olesya Petrova	Russia	7.350	9.100		16.450
2nd place, silver medalist(s)	Mariya Trubach	Belarus	7.200	9.000		16.200
3rd place, bronze medalist(s)	Linoy Ashram	Israel	6.900	8.800		15.700
4	Katerina Marinova	Bulgaria	6.775	8.800		15.575
5	Ana Luiza Filiorianu	Romania	6.700	8.800		15.500
6	Zhala Piriyeva	Azerbaijan	6.550	8.633		15.183
7	Arianna Malavasi	Italy	6.400	8.533		14.933
8	Alexandra Kis	Hungary	6.500	8.200		14.700

==== Ribbon ====
Rank	Gymnast	Nation	D Score	E Score	Pen.	Total
1st place, gold medalist(s)	Irina Annenkova	Russia	6.950	8.866		15.816
2nd place, silver medalist(s)	Valeriya Khanina	Ukraine	6.950	8.800		15.750
3rd place, bronze medalist(s)	Linoy Ashram	Israel	6.950	8.700		15.650
4	Eleni Kelaiditi	Greece	7.000	8.566		15.566
5	Stefaniya Sofiya Manakhava	Belarus	6.600	8.700		15.300
6	Katerina Marinova	Bulgaria	6.600	8.433		15.033
7	Letizia Cicconcelli	Italy	6.700	8.200		14.900
8	Zhala Piriyeva	Azerbaijan	6.700	8.133	0.60	14.233

== Medal count ==
=== Seniors ===
Rank	Nation	Gold	Silver	Bronze	Total
1	Russia	3	1	0	4
2	Bulgaria	1	0	1	2
3	Azerbaijan	0	1	0	1
3	Belarus	0	1	0	1
3	Italy	0	1	0	1
6	Israel	0	0	1	1
6	Spain	0	0	1	1
6	Ukraine	0	0	1	1
Totals (8 entries)		4	4	4	12

=== Juniors ===
Rank	Nation	Gold	Silver	Bronze	Total
1	Russia	5	0	0	5
2	Belarus	0	3	1	4
3	Azerbaijan	0	1	1	2
4	Ukraine	0	1	0	1
5	Israel	0	0	2	2
6	Bulgaria	0	0	1	1
Totals (6 entries)		5	5	5	15
