= Gymnastics at the 2024 BRICS Games =

Gymnastics event

- Venue: Kazan Gymnastics Center
- Location: Kazan, Russia
- Dates: 13–22 June

The gymnastics events at the 2024 BRICS Games took place in the Kazan Gymnastics Center in Kazan, Russia. Artistic gymnastics was held between 13 and 15 June, and rhythmic gymnastics was held between 20 and 22 June. There were 108 participants in artistic gymnastics and 72 in rhythmic gymnastics. This was the first time Russian gymnasts competed internationally since the ban in 2022.

== Artistic gymnastics ==
Russia's Daniel Marinov won the men's all-around title in his international debut, ahead of Olympic champion Artur Dalaloyan. Leyla Vasilyeva won the women's all-around ahead of teammate Anna Kalmykova.

=== Medal summary ===
Event	Gold	Silver	Bronze
Men
All-around	(Russia) Daniel Marinov	(Russia) Artur Dalaloyan	(Belarus) Yahor Sharamkou
Floor exercise	(Belarus) Yahor Sharamkou	(Russia) Nikita Nagornyy	(Belarus) Yaraslau Krutau
Pommel horse	(Russia) Vladislav Polyashov	(Kazakhstan) Diyas Toishybek	(Mongolia) Enkhtuvshin Damdindorj
Rings	(Turkey) Yunus Emre Gundogdu	(Russia) Artur Dalaloyan	(Russia) Daniel Marinov
Vault	(Russia) Nikita Nagornyy	(Russia) Daniel Marinov	(Belarus) Yahor Sharamkou
Parallel bars	(Russia) Daniel Marinov	(Russia) Vladislav Polyashov	(Kazakhstan) Alisher Toibazarov
Horizontal bar	(Russia) Sergei Naidin	(Russia) Daniel Marinov	(Mongolia) Enkhtuvshin Damdindorj
Women
All-around	(Russia) Leyla Vasilyeva	(Russia) Anna Kalmykova	(Belarus) Kira Maharevich
Vault	(Russia) Anna Kalmykova	(Russia) Angelina Melnikova	(Uzbekistan) Jasmina Makhmudova
Uneven bars	(Russia) Angelina Melnikova	(Russia) Leyla Vasilyeva	(Belarus) Alena Tsitavets
Balance beam	(Russia) Maria Agafonova	(Thailand) Sasiwimon Mueangphuan	(Belarus) Kira Maharevich
Floor exercise	(Russia) Anna Kalmykova	(Russia) Leyla Vasilyeva	(Thailand) Sasiwimon Mueangphuan

== Rhythmic gymnastics ==
The rhythmic gymnastics competition featured both seniors (born 2008 or earlier) and juniors (born after 2008). In the senior competition, European champion Lala Kramarenko won the all-around title ahead of teammate Maria Borisova and Olympian Anastasiia Salos.

=== Medal summary ===
Event	Gold	Silver	Bronze
Seniors
Individual all-around	(Russia) Lala Kramarenko	(Russia) Maria Borisova	(Belarus) Anastasiia Salos
Hoop	(Russia) Maria Borisova	(Uzbekistan) Vilana Savadyan	(Belarus) Daria Grokhotova
Ball	(Russia) Anna Popova	(Belarus) Anastasiia Salos	(Uzbekistan) Vilana Savadyan
Clubs	(Russia) Diana Chugunikhina	(Belarus) Anastasiia Salos	(Uzbekistan) Vilana Savadyan
Ribbon	(Russia) Lala Kramarenko	(Uzbekistan) Vilana Savadyan	(Belarus) Daria Grokhotova
Group all-around	Russia; Anna Trineeva; Janina Sirotinina; Victoriya Kirnus; Zlata Devyatyarova; Sofya Ivashina; Alla Koryagina	Uzbekistan; Yasmina Mkrtycheva; Yuliya Valevataya; Kamilla Kagirova; Nikol Zilotova; Madina Yunusova; Diana Khakimova	Kazakhstan; Jasmina Junusbayeva; Aizere Kenges; Aida Khakimzhanova; Madina Myrzabay; Aizere Nurmagambetova; Kristina Chepulskaya
5 hoops	Russia; Mariia Fedorovtseva; Anna Batasova; Alina Rusanova; Sofiia Iakovleva; Nonna Nianina	Belarus; Arina Tsitsilina; Karyna Yarmolenka; Dana Chayevskaya; Lalita Matskevich; Palina Aliaksandrava	Kazakhstan; Jasmina Junusbayeva; Aizere Kenges; Aida Khakimzhanova; Madina Myrzabay; Aizere Nurmagambetova
3 ribbons + 2 balls	Belarus; Arina Tsitsilina; Karyna Yarmolenka; Dana Chayevskaya; Lalita Matskevich; Palina Aliaksandrava	Russia; Anna Trineeva; Janina Sirotinina; Victoriya Kirnus; Zlata Devyatyarova; Sofya Ivashina; Alla Koryagina	Kazakhstan; Jasmina Junusbayeva; Aida Khakimzhanova; Madina Myrzabay; Aizere Nurmagambetova; Kristina Chepulskaya
Juniors
Individual all-around	(Russia) Kristina Voytenko	(Russia) Arina Kovshova	(Belarus) Nicole Liauta
Hoop	(Belarus) Nicole Liauta	(Russia) Nikol Rimarachin Dias	(Kyrgyzstan) Alina Karayvan
Ball	(Russia) Sofiia Ilteriakova	(Belarus) Nicole Liauta	(Kyrgyzstan) Asel Arapova
Clubs	(Russia) Nikol Rimarachin Dias	(Belarus) Nicole Liauta	(Kyrgyzstan) Asel Arapova
Ribbon	(Russia) Uliana Ianus	(Kyrgyzstan) Asel Arapova	(Belarus) Nicole Liauta
Group all-around	Russia; Melissa Golubeva; Ksenia Zhuravleva; Victoria Zolotova; Polina Kovalenko; Polina Melinauskaite; Anastasia Semikova	Belarus; Yuliya Druzhynina; Aryanna Parkhachova; Aliaksandra Kurak; Yaseniya Paretskaya; Kamilla Baranova; Anastasiya Zhukavets	Thailand; Samonwarin Nimnatipun; Bussakhol Tonsalee; Kingfa Bubpha; Lanna Witurakul; Pimlapat Phromma; Sitanan Eakbunnasing
5 hoops	Russia; Melissa Golubeva; Ksenia Zhuravleva; Polina Kovalenko; Polina Melinauskaite; Anastasia Semikova	Belarus; Yuliya Druzhynina; Aryanna Parkhachova; Aliaksandra Kurak; Yaseniya Paretskaya; Anastasiya Zhukavets	Kyrgyzstan; Sofiia Melnichuk; Anastasiia Abramova; Samira Tursunbaeva; Aruuke Semeteeva; Bella Kudaibergenova
10 clubs	Russia; Eva Kalinina; Vladislava Narenkova; Mariya Kupriyanova; Arina Kachaeva; Kira Petrova	Belarus; Yuliya Druzhynina; Aryanna Parkhachova; Aliaksandra Kurak; Yaseniya Paretskaya; Kamilla Baranova	Thailand; Samonwarin Nimnatipun; Bussakhol Tonsalee; Sitanan Eakbunnasing; Lanna Witurakul; Pimlapat Phromma
