= Gymnastics at the 2022 Asian Games – Women's rhythmic team =

Women's team at the 2022 Asian Games
- Venue: Huanglong Gymnasium
- Date: 6 October 2023
- Competitors: 32 from 9 nations

Medalists
gold medal	Uzbekistan; Evelina Atalyants, Takhmina Ikromova, Vilana Savadyan
silver medal	Kazakhstan; Milana Parfilova, Elzhana Taniyeva, Erika Zhailauova
bronze medal	China; Li Huilin, Wang Zilu, Zhao Yating, Zhao Yue

The women's rhythmic team competition at the 2022 Asian Games took place on 6 October 2023 at the Huanglong Sports Centre Gymnasium.

== Schedule ==
All times are China Standard Time (UTC+08:00)

Date	Time	Event
Friday, 6 October 2023	10:00	Final

== Results ==
Rank	Team	Hoop (rhythmic gymnastics)	Ball (rhythmic gymnastics)	Clubs (rhythmic gymnastics)	Ribbon (rhythmic gymnastics)	Total
1st place, gold medalist(s)	Uzbekistan (UZB)	68.700	97.900	95.700	62.500	324.800
	Evelina Atalyants	34.850	33.400	31.950	31.250	
	Takhmina Ikromova	33.850	33.300	33.100	31.250	
	Vilana Savadyan	~~27.300~~	31.200	30.650	~~30.350~~	
2nd place, silver medalist(s)	Kazakhstan (KAZ)	95.900	95.350	63.350	62.500	317.100
	Milana Parfilova	32.200	30.950	31.450	30.600	
	Elzhana Taniyeva	32.750	33.000	31.900	31.900	
	Erika Zhailauova	30.950	31.400	~~27.550~~	~~30.450~~	
3rd place, bronze medalist(s)	China (CHN)	95.150	94.750	62.950	60.550	313.400
	Li Huilin	30.750		~~28.600~~		
	Wang Zilu	32.500	32.300	32.550	~~28.800~~	
	Zhao Yating	31.900	33.000	30.400	31.100	
	Zhao Yue		29.450		29.450	
4	Japan (JPN)	91.050	59.850	56.900	85.200	293.000
	Yume Kaiho	30.100	27.850	28.150	29.000	
	Reina Matsusaka	31.500	32.000	~~25.100~~	30.300	
	Mei Tsuruta	29.450	~~23.500~~	28.750	25.900	
5	South Korea (KOR)	57.500	85.200	85.750	55.850	284.300
	Cho Byeol-ah		28.050		27.600	
	Ha Su-lee	28.800	27.550	28.800	28.250	
	Kim Joo-won	~~27.000~~		28.500		
	Sohn Ji-in	28.700	29.600	28.450	~~27.350~~	
6	Kyrgyzstan (KGZ)	53.550	78.550	81.800	51.150	265.050
	Elizaveta Golinko	27.950	27.350	27.950	25.850	
	Sevara Khaitova	~~24.800~~				
	Albina Kozubaeva		25.850	26.500	25.300	
	Tinatin Satykeeva	25.600	25.350	27.350	~~22.650~~	
7	Singapore (SGP)	50.400	79.650	73.800	47.950	251.800
	Pebbyl Ang		26.600	23.550	22.200	
	Katelin Heng	24.150	24.450	24.050		
	Sophia Ho	~~20.500~~			~~20.000~~	
	Mikayla Yang	26.250	28.600	26.200	25.750	
8	Thailand (THA)	72.100	49.550	68.600	46.200	236.450
	Piyada Peeramatukorn	25.400	24.200	22.650	22.750	
	Puntita Thongsong	25.600	25.350	24.800	23.450	
	Mareya Waeuseng	21.100	~~20.050~~	21.150	~~21.050~~	
9	Mongolia (MGL)	66.700	68.600	40.900	39.550	215.750
	Zolbayaryn Ankhtamir	19.950		~~16.350~~	20.550	
	Narangereliin Anujin		22.500	20.850	~~18.750~~	
	Ganzorigiin Günchinmaa	21.450	19.700	20.050		
	Erdenebayaryn Lkhagvatsetseg	25.300	26.400		19.000	
