= Gymnastics at the 2026 Asian Games – Women's rhythmic group all-around =

Women's rhythmic group all-around at the 2026 Asian
- Venue: Nippon Gaishi Hall Rainbow Hall
- Date: 02 October 2026 (qualification); 03 October 2026 (final)
- Nations: 10

Medalists
gold medal	China; Ding Xinyi, Liu Miaoting, Pu Yanzhu, Wang Lanjing, Zhang Xinyi
silver medal	Japan; Natsumi Hanamura, Megumi Nishimoto, Hisano Taguchi, Kaseno Tanabe, Yuna Tanaka
bronze medal	Kazakhstan; Kristina Chepulskaya, Jasmine Junusbayeva, Aida Khakimzhanova, Madina Myrzabay, Aizere Nurmagambetova

The women's rhythmic group all-around competition at the 2026 Asian Games took place from 2 to 3 October 2026 at Nippon Gaishi Hall Rainbow Hall in Nagoya, Japan.

The event was held for the first time in the history of the Asian Games, replacing the Team event that had previously been held alongside the Individual All-Around competition.

== Schedule ==
All times are Japan Standard Time (UTC+09:00)

Date	Time	Event
Friday, 2 October 2026	18:00	Qualification
Saturday, 3 October 2026	19:00	Final

== Results ==
=== Qualification ===
Rank	Team	5	3 + 2	Total
1	Kazakhstan; Kristina Chepulskaya; Jasmine Junusbayeva; Aida Khakimzhanova; Madina Myrzabay; Aizere Nurmagambetova	26.950	26.350	53.300
2	China; Ding Xinyi; Liu Miaoting; Pu Yanzhu; Wang Lanjing; Zhang Xinyi	26.500	26.500	53.000
3	Japan; Natsumi Hanamura; Megumi Nishimoto; Hisano Taguchi; Kaseno Tanabe; Yuna Tanaka	23.900	24.400	48.300
4	South Korea; Suyeon Park; Minseul Kim; Jiwoo Kim; Ekaterina Yan; Jungeun Lee	23.900	23.300	47.200
5	Uzbekistan; Yosina Djuraeva; Diana Khakimova; Irodakhon Sadikova; Milana Safina; Sofiya Usova	21.050	25.750	46.800
6	Thailand; Rakkan Chaichonich; Pichayatida Ketsakul; I-aun Khoonrugsa; Pornnutcha Jedthumrong; Puntita Thongsong	23.250	21.400	44.650
7	Kyrgyzstan; Ariana Keliotis; Bella Kudaibergenova; Nazik Kuttubekova; Sofiia Melnichuk; Ailun Suerkulova	20.000	22.700	42.700
8	Chinese Taipei; Chi-yun Chang; Yu-wen Lee; Tzu-wen Li; Yuan-lo Lu; Keng-hsin Sun	18.450	20.050	38.500
9	Singapore; Yue Xuan Thadine Ang; Cleo Chew; Xin Yu Liew; Megan Jiahui Tan; Mirabelle Yu Chelle Yet	15.400	20.250	35.650
10	Malaysia; Ee Shuen Low; Carol Yuan Qi Na; Maia Xiao Han Ong; Bernice Qin Nin See; Victoria Manalang Fu Hui Tan	14.650	18.700	33.350

== Final ==
Rank	Team	5	3 + 2	Total
1st place, gold medalist(s)	China; Ding Xinyi; Liu Miaoting; Pu Yanzhu; Wang Lanjing; Zhang Xinyi	27.550	27.750	55.300
2nd place, silver medalist(s)	Japan; Natsumi Hanamura; Megumi Nishimoto; Hisano Taguchi; Kaseno Tanabe; Yuna Tanaka	26.250	26.250	52.500
3rd place, bronze medalist(s)	Kazakhstan; Kristina Chepulskaya; Jasmine Junusbayeva; Aida Khakimzhanova; Madina Myrzabay; Aizere Nurmagambetova	25.450	26.100	51.550
4	Uzbekistan; Yosina Djuraeva; Diana Khakimova; Irodakhon Sadikova; Milana Safina; Sofiya Usova	23.700	26.150	49.850
5	South Korea; Suyeon Park; Minseul Kim; Jiwoo Kim; Ekaterina Yan; Jungeun Lee	21.400	23.950	45.350
6	Chinese Taipei; Chi-yun Chang; Yu-wen Lee; Tzu-wen Li; Yuan-lo Lu; Keng-hsin Sun	21.550	20.650	42.200
7	Thailand; Rakkan Chaichonich; Pichayatida Ketsakul; I-aun Khoonrugsa; Pornnutcha Jedthumrong; Puntita Thongsong	18.300	21.800	40.100
8	Kyrgyzstan; Ariana Keliotis; Bella Kudaibergenova; Nazik Kuttubekova; Sofiia Melnichuk; Ailun Suerkulova	20.600	19.050	39.650
