= 2025 Asian Rhythmic Gymnastics Championships =

Gymnastics event in Singapore

2025 Asian Gymnastics Championships
- Venue: OCBC Arena
- Location: Singapore
- Start date: 16 May 2025
- End date: 18 May 2025

The 16th Rhythmic Gymnastics Asian Championships and the 21st Junior Asian Gymnastics Championships were held from 16 to 18 May 2025 in Singapore. For 2025, the event also doubles as the Oceania Rhythmic Gymnastics Championships, with the gymnasts from Australia and New Zealand being ranked separately from the Asian competitors.

Takhmina Ikromova from Uzbekistan won her third title. In the group event, the Kazakhstani group won their first Asian Championships gold medal; their score of 48.450 was just .200 ahead of the silver medalists, the South Korean group (48.250), and .250 ahead of the bronze medalists, the Uzbekistani group (48.200).

== Medal winners ==
=== Senior ===
Event	Gold	Silver	Bronze
All-around
All-Around	(Uzbekistan) Takhmina Ikromova	(Uzbekistan) Anastasiya Sarantseva	(Kazakhstan) Aibota Yertaikyzy
Team	Uzbekistan; Senior Individual; Takhmina Ikromova; Anastasiya Sarantseva; Nataliya Usova; Senior Group; Evelina Atalyants; Adelya Fayzulina; Mumtozabonu Iskhokzoda; Amaliya Mamedova; Irodakhon Sadikova; Maftuna Zoirova	Kazakhstan; Senior Individual; Aiym Meirzhanova; Aibota Yertaikyzy; Senior Group; Kristina Chepulskaya; Jasmine Junusbayeva; Aizere Kenges; Aida Khakimzhanova; Madina Myrzabay; Aizere Nurmagambetova	Japan; Senior Individual; Mirano Kita; Reina Matsusaka; Senior Group; Noa Futatsugi; Airi Higashi; Miyu Kimura; Nonoka Murakuni; Rika Nakamura; Miu Omachi
Group	Kazakhstan; Kristina Chepulskaya; Jasmine Junusbayeva; Aizere Kenges; Aida Khakimzhanova; Madina Myrzabay; Aizere Nurmagambetova	South Korea; Habyn Cho; Jiwoo Kim; Minseul Kim; Jungeun Lee; Suyeon Park; Ekaterina Yan	Uzbekistan; Evelina Atalyants; Adelya Fayzulina; Mumtozabonu Iskhokzoda; Amaliya Mamedova; Irodakhon Sadikova; Maftuna Zoirova
Individual
Hoop	(Uzbekistan) Takhmina Ikromova	(Japan) Mirano Kita	(Uzbekistan) Anastasiya Sarantseva
Ball	(Uzbekistan) Anastasiya Sarantseva	(Japan) Reina Matsusaka	(Uzbekistan) Takhmina Ikromova
Clubs	(Uzbekistan) Takhmina Ikromova	(Japan) Reina Matsusaka	(Kazakhstan) Aiym Meirzhanova
Ribbon	(Kazakhstan) Aibota Yertaikyzy	(Uzbekistan) Nataliya Usova	(Japan) Reina Matsusaka
Group
5 ribbons	Uzbekistan; Evelina Atalyants; Adelya Fayzulina; Mumtozabonu Iskhokzoda; Amaliya Mamedova; Irodakhon Sadikova; Maftuna Zoirova	Kazakhstan; Kristina Chepulskaya; Jasmine Junusbayeva; Aizere Kenges; Aida Khakimzhanova; Madina Myrzabay; Aizere Nurmagambetova	South Korea; Habyn Cho; Jiwoo Kim; Minseul Kim; Jungeun Lee; Suyeon Park; Ekaterina Yan
3 balls + 2 Hoops	Kazakhstan; Kristina Chepulskaya; Jasmine Junusbayeva; Aizere Kenges; Aida Khakimzhanova; Madina Myrzabay; Aizere Nurmagambetova	Uzbekistan; Evelina Atalyants; Adelya Fayzulina; Mumtozabonu Iskhokzoda; Amaliya Mamedova; Irodakhon Sadikova; Maftuna Zoirova	South Korea; Habyn Cho; Jiwoo Kim; Minseul Kim; Jungeun Lee; Suyeon Park; Ekaterina Yan

=== Junior ===
Event	Gold	Silver	Bronze
All-around
All-Around	(China) Wang Qi	(Kazakhstan) Akmaral Yerekesheva	(Kuwait) Layan Behbehani
Team	Uzbekistan; Junior Individual; Sabina Kagirova; Viktoriya Nikiforova; Sofiya Usova; Junior Group; Yosina Djuraeva; Alana Khafizova; Zamira Khvalcheva; Milana Safina; Kristina Shin; Jasmine Yakhlakova	Kazakhstan; Junior Individual; Aiganym Rysbek; Akmaral Yerekesheva; Junior Group; Aliya Bakytkyzy; Anastassiya Chachsina; Xeniya Shimolina; Tamiris Vakhloova; Evgeniia Vendirevskaya; Yelizaveta Yegorova	South Korea; Junior Individual; Eunchae Seo; Haeun Jung; Juah Lee; Junior Group; Yumin Jung; Nayul Kang; Hayul Kim; Sunjae Kim; Seunga Woo
Group	Uzbekistan; Yosina Djuraeva; Alana Khafizova; Zamira Khvalcheva; Milana Safina; Kristina Shin; Jasmine Yakhlakova	Kazakhstan; Aliya Bakytkyzy; Anastassiya Chachsina; Xeniya Shimolina; Tamiris Vakhloova; Evgeniia Vendirevskaya; Yelizaveta Yegorova	Malaysia; Elodie Cheah; Rhea Dhaliwall; Jing Yar Lim; Ee Shuen Low; Ru Zanne Sui; Yi Xuan Tan
Individual
Hoop	(China) Wang Qi	(Uzbekistan) Viktoriya Nikiforova	(Kyrgyzstan) Sofia Iarovaia
Ball	(Kazakhstan) Akmaral Yerekesheva	(Uzbekistan) Sofiya Usova	(China) Wang Qi
Clubs	(China) Wang Qi	(Kazakhstan) Akmaral Yerekesheva	(Uzbekistan) Viktoriya Nikiforova
Ribbon	(Kazakhstan) Akmaral Yerekesheva	(Uzbekistan) Sofiya Usova	(China) Wang Qi
Group
5 hoops	Kazakhstan; Aliya Bakytkyzy; Anastassiya Chachsina; Xeniya Shimolina; Tamiris Vakhloova; Evgeniia Vendirevskaya; Yelizaveta Yegorova	Uzbekistan; Yosina Djuraeva; Alana Khafizova; Zamira Khvalcheva; Milana Safina; Kristina Shin; Jasmine Yakhlakova	Japan; Nanaka Goto; Aika Hayashida; Mion Ichimura; Kurumi Kuroda; Mirei Nakazawa; Kyoka Shiigi
10 clubs	Kazakhstan; Aliya Bakytkyzy; Anastassiya Chachsina; Xeniya Shimolina; Tamiris Vakhloova; Evgeniia Vendirevskaya; Yelizaveta Yegorova	South Korea; Yumin Jung; Nayul Kang; Hayul Kim; Sunjae Kim; Seunga Woo	Uzbekistan; Yosina Djuraeva; Alana Khafizova; Zamira Khvalcheva; Milana Safina; Kristina Shin; Jasmine Yakhlakova

=== Oceanian Championships ===
Event	Gold	Silver	Bronze
Oceania
Oceania	(Australia) Miyabi Akiya	(New Zealand) Havana Hopman	(Australia) Polina Leonova

== Results ==
=== Senior ===
==== Individual All-Around ====
Rank	Gymnast	Nation	Hoop (rhythmic gymnastics)	Ball (rhythmic gymnastics)	Clubs (rhythmic gymnastics)	Ribbon (rhythmic gymnastics)	Total
1st place, gold medalist(s)	Takhmina Ikromova	Uzbekistan	28.250 (2)	27.900 (1)	28.300 (1)	26.950 (5)	84.500
2nd place, silver medalist(s)	Anastasiya Sarantseva	Uzbekistan	28.450 (1)	27.800 (2)	27.600 (4)		83.850
3rd place, bronze medalist(s)	Aibota Yertaikyzy	Kazakhstan	25.100 (9)	26.900 (3)	28.000 (2)	27.300 (1)	82.200
4	Reina Matsusaka	Japan	26.100 (6)	26.300 (5)	27.650 (3)	27.050 (4)	81.000
5	Aiym Meirzhanova	Kazakhstan	26.650 (3)	26.550 (4)	25.950 (6)	27.250 (2)	80.450
6	Mikayla Angeline Yang	Singapore	25.400 (7)	25.050 (7)	25.000 (9)	26.300 (6)	76.750
7	Wang Zilu	China	23.600 (13)	24.500 (10)	26.750 (5)	24.450 (11)	75.700
8	Mirano Kita	Japan	26.650 (4)	23.700 (14)	24.650 (11)	24.000 (13)	75.300
9	Jasmine Althea Ramilo	Philippines	26.150 (5)	24.550 (9)	24.600 (13)	22.850 (15)	75.300
10	Ng Joe Ee	Malaysia	22.400 (18)	23.800 (12)	25.900 (7)	25.600 (8)	75.300
11	Suyi Ha	South Korea	23.000 (16)		25.400 (8)	25.900 (7)	74.300
12	Wong Weng Qin Mavia	Malaysia	23.350 (14)	24.450 (11)	24.100 (14)	24.650 (10)	73.200
13	Uliana Ovchinnikova	Kyrgyzstan	23.000 (15)	22.400 (16)	24.950 (10)	24.350 (12)	72.300
14	Arina Gazieva	Kyrgyzstan	25.300 (8)	23.700 (13)	23.200 (15)	21.850 (20)	72.200
15	Thea Chew	Singapore	24.550 (11)	21.650 (20)	21.150 (25)	25.450 (9)	71.650
16	Zhao Yue	China	24.800 (10)		24.650 (12)	21.450 (22)	70.900
17	Cho Byeol-ah	South Korea	24.000 (12)	23.000 (15)		23.400 (14)	70.400
18	Piyada Peeramatukorn	Thailand	19.950 (27)	21.100 (21)	22.700 (17)	22.650 (16)	66.450
19	Peng Fan-xi	Chinese Taipei	21.400 (21)	21.700 (18)	20.600 (26)	22.300 (18)	65.400
20	Breanna Labadan	Philippines	19.300 (28)	21.800 (17)	21.500 (20)	22.000 (19)	65.300
21	Lai Yi-Tong	Chinese Taipei	21.150 (22)	20.850 (23)	21.250 (23)	22.500 (17)	64.900
22	Sikharee Sutthiragsa	Thailand	19.050 (30)	20.550 (26)	22.750 (16)	20.800 (24)	64.100
23	Praewa Misato Philaphandeth	Laos	17.250 (32)	20.750 (24)	21.750 (19)	20.400 (25)	62.900
24	Wahyuni Tri	Indonesia	20.150 (26)	20.750 (25)	20.150 (28)	21.650 (21)	62.550
25	Urangoo Namkhaibayar	Mongolia	20.600 (24)	20.900 (22)	19.650 (30)	20.950 (23)	62.450
26	Prasen Sanyukta Kale	India					
27	Lkhagvatsetseg Erdenebayar	Mongolia					
28	Hung Ka Yi	Hong Kong					
29	Elissar Hanounik	Syria					
30	Lam Kai Wing	Hong Kong					
31	Sohn Ji-in	South Korea					
32	Salwa Aulia Wibowo	Indonesia					
33	Parina Madanpotra	India					'
34	Li Ting Huen	Hong Kong					
35	Febila Sintia Putri	Indonesia					
36	Naya Alghazzi	Syria					
37	Manya Sharma	India					
38	Nataliya Usova	Uzbekistan				27.200 (3)	
39	Li Huilin	China		24.700 (8)			

=== Hoop ===
Rank	Gymnast	Nation	D Score	E Score	A Score	Pen.	Total
1st place, gold medalist(s)	Takhmina Ikromova	Uzbekistan	12.600	7.900	8.200		28.700
2nd place, silver medalist(s)	Mirano Kita	Japan	11.600	7.550	7.550		26.700
3rd place, bronze medalist(s)	Anastasiya Sarantseva	Uzbekistan	11.700	7.150	7.550		26.400
4	Aiym Meirzhanova	Kazakhstan	10.800	7.650	7.550		26.000
5	Mikayla Angeline Yang	Singapore	11.100	7.400	7.450		25.950
6	Arina Gazieva	Kyrgyzstan	11.600	7.200	7.100		25.900
7	Reina Matsusaka	Japan	11.300	7.000	7.550		25.850
8	Jasmine Althea Ramilo	Philippines	11.100	7.550	7.150		25.800

==== Ball ====
Rank	Gymnast	Nation	D Score	E Score	A Score	Pen.	Total
1st place, gold medalist(s)	Anastasiya Sarantseva	Uzbekistan	13.200	8.050	7.800		29.050
2nd place, silver medalist(s)	Reina Matsusaka	Japan	11.800	7.850	8.250		27.900
3rd place, bronze medalist(s)	Takhmina Ikromova	Uzbekistan	11.800	7.600	8.050		27.450
4	Aiym Meirzhanova	Kazakhstan	11.800	7.900	7.350	0.050	27.000
5	Aibota Yertaikyzy	Kazakhstan	11.200	7.700	7.400		26.300
6	Mikayla Angeline Yang	Singapore	10.900	7.450	7.550		25.900
7	Li Huilin	China	9.600	7.350	7.650		24.600
8	Sohn Ji-in	South Korea	10.400	6.850	7.100		24.350

==== Clubs ====
Rank	Gymnast	Nation	D Score	E Score	A Score	Pen.	Total
1st place, gold medalist(s)	Takhmina Ikromova	Uzbekistan	13.100	8.100	8.150		29.350
2nd place, silver medalist(s)	Reina Matsusaka	Japan	12.200	7.700	8.000		27.900
3rd place, bronze medalist(s)	Aiym Meirzhanova	Kazakhstan	12.100	7.650	7.700		27.450
4	Wang Zilu	China	11.400	7.550	8.050		27.000
5	Suyi Ha	South Korea	12.100	7.400	7.400	0.050	26.850
6	Anastasiya Sarantseva	Uzbekistan	11.800	7.250	7.700		26.750
7	Aibota Yertaikyzy	Kazakhstan	12.100	6.850	7.450		26.400
8	Ng Joe Ee	Malaysia	10.500	6.150	7.250		23.900

==== Ribbon ====
Rank	Gymnast	Nation	D Score	E Score	A Score	Pen.	Total
1st place, gold medalist(s)	Aibota Yertaikyzy	Kazakhstan	12.500	7.850	7.800		28.150
2nd place, silver medalist(s)	Nataliya Usova	Uzbekistan	12.200	7.450	7.900		27.900
3rd place, bronze medalist(s)	Reina Matsusaka	Japan	11.600	7.600	8.000		27.200
4	Aiym Meirzhanova	Kazakhstan	11.800	7.500	7.700		27.000
5	Takhmina Ikromova	Uzbekistan	11.400	7.350	7.700		26.450
6	Suyi Ha	South Korea	11.700	7.250	7.400		26.350
7	Mikayla Angeline Yang	Singapore	10.700	6.850	7.600		25.150
8	Ng Joe Ee	Malaysia	10.500	7.050	7.350	0.300	24.600

==== Groups All-Around ====
Rank	Nation	5	3 + 2	Total
1st place, gold medalist(s)				
2nd place, silver medalist(s)				
3rd place, bronze medalist(s)				
4				
5				
6				
7				
8				
9				

==== 5 Ribbons ====
Rank	Nation	Total
1st place, gold medalist(s)		
2nd place, silver medalist(s)		
3rd place, bronze medalist(s)		
4		
5		
6		
7		
8		

==== 3 Balls + 2 Hoops ====
Rank	Nation	Total
1st place, gold medalist(s)		
2nd place, silver medalist(s)		
3rd place, bronze medalist(s)		
4		
5		
6		
7		
8		

=== Junior ===
==== Hoop ====
Rank	Gymnast	Nation	Total
1st place, gold medalist(s)			
2nd place, silver medalist(s)			
3rd place, bronze medalist(s)			
4			
5			
6			
7			
8			

==== Ball ====
Rank	Gymnast	Nation	Total
1st place, gold medalist(s)			
2nd place, silver medalist(s)			
3rd place, bronze medalist(s)			
4			
5			
6			
7			
8			

==== Clubs ====
Rank	Gymnast	Nation	Total
1st place, gold medalist(s)			
2nd place, silver medalist(s)			
3rd place, bronze medalist(s)			
4			
5			
6			
7			
8			

==== Ribbon ====
Rank	Gymnast	Nation	Total
1st place, gold medalist(s)			
2nd place, silver medalist(s)			
3rd place, bronze medalist(s)			
4			
5			
6			
7			
8			

==== Groups All-Around ====
Rank	Nation	5	3 + 2	Total
1st place, gold medalist(s)				
2nd place, silver medalist(s)				
3rd place, bronze medalist(s)				
4				
5				
6				
7				
8				
9				

==== 5 Hoops ====
Rank	Nation	Total
1st place, gold medalist(s)		
2nd place, silver medalist(s)		
3rd place, bronze medalist(s)		
4		
5		
6		
7		
8		

==== 5 Clubs ====
Rank	Nation	Total
1st place, gold medalist(s)		
2nd place, silver medalist(s)		
3rd place, bronze medalist(s)		
4		
5		
6		
7		
8		

== Overall medal table ==
* Host nation (Singapore)

Rank	Nation	Gold	Silver	Bronze	Total
1	Uzbekistan	8	7	5	20
2	Kazakhstan	7	6	2	15
3	China	3	0	2	5
4	Japan	0	3	3	6
5	South Korea	0	2	3	5
6	Kuwait	0	0	1	1
6	Kyrgyzstan	0	0	1	1
6	Malaysia	0	0	1	1
Totals (8 entries)		18	18	18	54
