= Zamira Khvalcheva =

Uzbekistani rhythmic gymnast

- Zamira Xvalcheva
- Born: 16 August 2011 (age 15) Navoiy region

Gymnastics career
- Discipline: Rhythmic gymnastics
- Country represented: Uzbekistan; (2025-present)
Medal record
Representing Uzbekistan
Rhythmic gymnastics
Junior World Championships
Bronze medal – third place	2025 Sofia	Team
Junior Asian Junior Championships
Gold medal – first place	2025 Singapore	Group All-Around
Gold medal – first place	2026 Bishkek	Group All-Around
Silver medal – second place	2025 Singapore	5 Hoops
Bronze medal – third place	2025 Singapore	10 Clubs

Zamira Khvalcheva (Uzbek: Zamira Xvalcheva; born 16 August 2011) is an Uzbek rhythmic gymnast. She represents Uzbekistan in international competitions.

== Biography ==
=== Junior ===
In 2023 Khvalcheva won gold in the All-Around among gymnasts born in 2011 at the championships of the Navoiy region, later she won bronze in teams at the Youth Cup of Uzbekistan.

She was called up to join the Uzbek national junior group in 2025. In March she won bronze overall and silver with 10 clubs at the Sofia International Cup. In early May silver in the All-Around and gold with 5 hoops at the Shining star tournament. Later she competed in the Asian Championships in Singapore, winning gold in the All-Around and in the two event finals. In late June Djuraeva was selected for the 3rd Junior World Championships in Sofia, winning bronze in teams along groupmates Alana Khafizova, Yosina Djuraeva, Milana Safina, Kristina Shin, Jasmine Yakhlakova and individuals Viktoriya Nikiforova and Sofiya Usova.

In 2026 the renewed group participated in the European Cup in Baku, being the only junior group there. In May she was selected along Kamilla Astanova, Ornella Bikmaeva, Alisiya Galati, Safiya Pulatova and Farida Abdulova for the Asian Championships in Bishkek.
