= Jasmine Yakhlakova =

Uzbekistani rhythmic gymnast

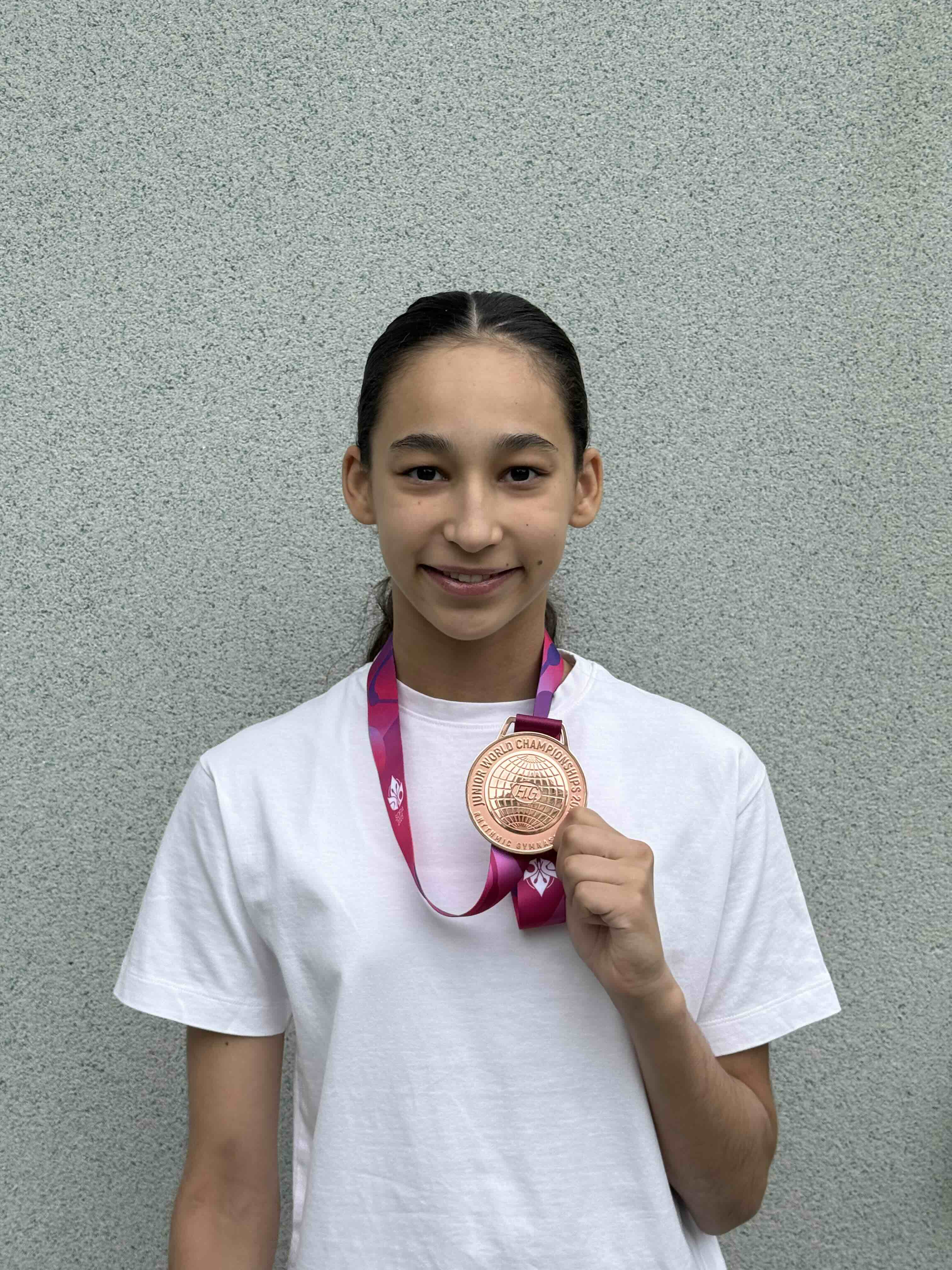

Personal information
- Born: 9 July 2010 (age 16) United Arab Emirates

Gymnastics career
- Discipline: Rhythmic gymnastics
- Country represented: Uzbekistan (2025-present)
- Former countries represented: United Arab Emirates
Medal record
Representing Uzbekistan
Rhythmic gymnastics
Junior World Championships
Bronze medal – third place	2025 Sofia	Team
Junior Asian Junior Championships
Gold medal – first place	2025 Singapore	Group All-Around
Silver medal – second place	2025 Singapore	5 Hoops
Bronze medal – third place	2025 Singapore	10 Clubs

Jasmine Yakhlakova (born 9 July 2010) is an Uzbek rhythmic gymnast. She represents Uzbekistan in international competitions.

== Biography ==
In 2024 Yakhlakova represented the United Arab Emirates, where she was born, at the Miss Valentine tournament taking 12th place.

In 2025 she started competing for Uzbekistan, entering the national junior group. In March she won bronze overall and silver with 10 clubs at the Sofia International Cup. In early May silver in the All-Around and gold with 5 hoops at the Shining star tournament. Later she competed in the Asian Championships in Singapore, winning gold in the All-Around and in the two event finals. In late June Jasmine Yakhlakova was selected for the 3rd Junior World Championships in Sofia, winning bronze in teams along groupmates Alana Khafizova, Yosina Djuraeva, Milana Safina, Kristina Shin, Zamira Khvalcheva and individuals Viktoriya Nikiforova and Sofiya Usova.
