= Evelina Atalyants =

Uzbekistani rhythmic gymnast (born 2007)

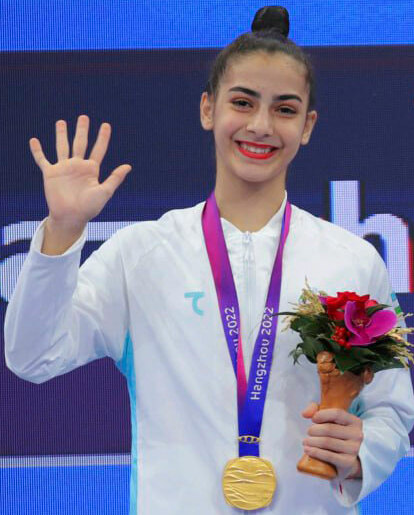
- Atalyants at the 2022 Asian Games

Personal information
- Full name: Evelina Vartanovna Atalyants
- Born: 1 July 2007 (age 19) Tashkent, Uzbekistan
- Height: 164 cm (5 ft 5 in)

Gymnastics career
- Discipline: Rhythmic gymnastics
- Country represented: Uzbekistan; (2022 - present)
- Head coaches: Rano Mukhamedova, Luiza Ganieva
Medal record
Representing Uzbekistan
Rhythmic gymnastics
Event	1st	2nd	3rd
FIG World Cup	0	0	2
Total	0	0	2
Asian Games
Gold medal – first place	2022 Hangzhou	Team
Asian Championships
Gold medal – first place	2023 Manila	Team
Gold medal – first place	2024 Tashkent	Team
Gold medal – first place	2024 Tashkent	Group All-Around
Gold medal – first place	2024 Tashkent	3 ribbons + 2 balls
Gold medal – first place	2026 Bishkek	Team
Gold medal – first place	2026 Bishkek	Group All-Around
Silver medal – second place	2023 Manila	Ball
Silver medal – second place	2024 Tashkent	5 Hoops

Evelina Vartanovna Atalyants (born 1 July 2007) is an Uzbekistani rhythmic gymnast. As an individual gymnast, she won the clubs title at the 2022 Junior Asian Championships and a team title at the 2023 Asian Championships. At the 2022 Asian Games, she won a gold medal in the team event and finished fourth in the all-around. She joined the senior national group in 2024, winning the group all-around title at the 2024 Asian Championships and qualifying for the 2024 Summer Olympics, where they finished eighth in the group all-around final.

== Career ==
Atalyants began rhythmic gymnastics in 2013. She competed at the 2022 Asian Championships as a junior, winning silver in the team competition (with Nataliya Usova, Anastasiya Sarantseva and Vilana Savadyan) and gold in the clubs final. She also competed in the Children of Asia International Sport Games in Vladivostok, Russia, where she won several medals and achieved good results.

=== 2023 ===
Atalyants became age-eligible for senior competition in 2023. She finished 15th in the all-around at the 2023 Athens World Cup and 11th in the all-around at the Milan World Cup. She participated in the Grand Prix de Thiais where she finished sixth in the all-around, she also finished sixth in the hoop and ball final and seventh in clubs. At the 2023 Asian Championships, she won a silver medal in the ball final behind teammate Takhmina Ikromova, and she won a gold medal with the Uzbekistan team (with Ikromova, Yosmina Rakhimova and group). She then competed at the 2023 World Championships and finished 23rd in the all-around during the qualification round, missing out on the top-18 all-around final. Additionally, the Uzbekistan team finished 10th.

After the World Championships, Atalyants competed at the 2022 Asian Games, which were held in 2023 due to the COVID-19 pandemic. She won a gold medal in the team event alongside Takhmina Ikromova and Vilana Savadyan. She then finished fourth in the all-around final behind Ikromova and Kazakhstan's Elzhana Taniyeva and Milana Parfilova.

=== 2024 ===
Atalyants joined the senior national group in 2024. In March, she won a bronze medal alongside her teammates at the Thiais Grand Prix in 3 ribbons and 2 balls. The next month, they won a silver medal in the 3 ribbons and 2 balls final at the Tashkent World Cup. She then competed in the 2024 Asian Championships, where the Uzbekistani group won gold in the all-around. Their placement earned them a berth for the 2024 Summer Olympics. The group also won the gold medal in the 3 ribbons + 2 balls final and the silver medal behind Japan in the 5 hoops final. They also won the team gold medal alongside Uzbekistan's individual gymnasts.

Atalyants represented Uzbekistan at the 2024 Summer Olympics alongside Amaliya Mamedova, Shakhzoda Ibragimova, Mumtozabonu Iskhokzoda, and Irodakhon Sadikova. The group advanced to the group all-around final in seventh place, where they ultimately finished eighth.

== Routine music information ==
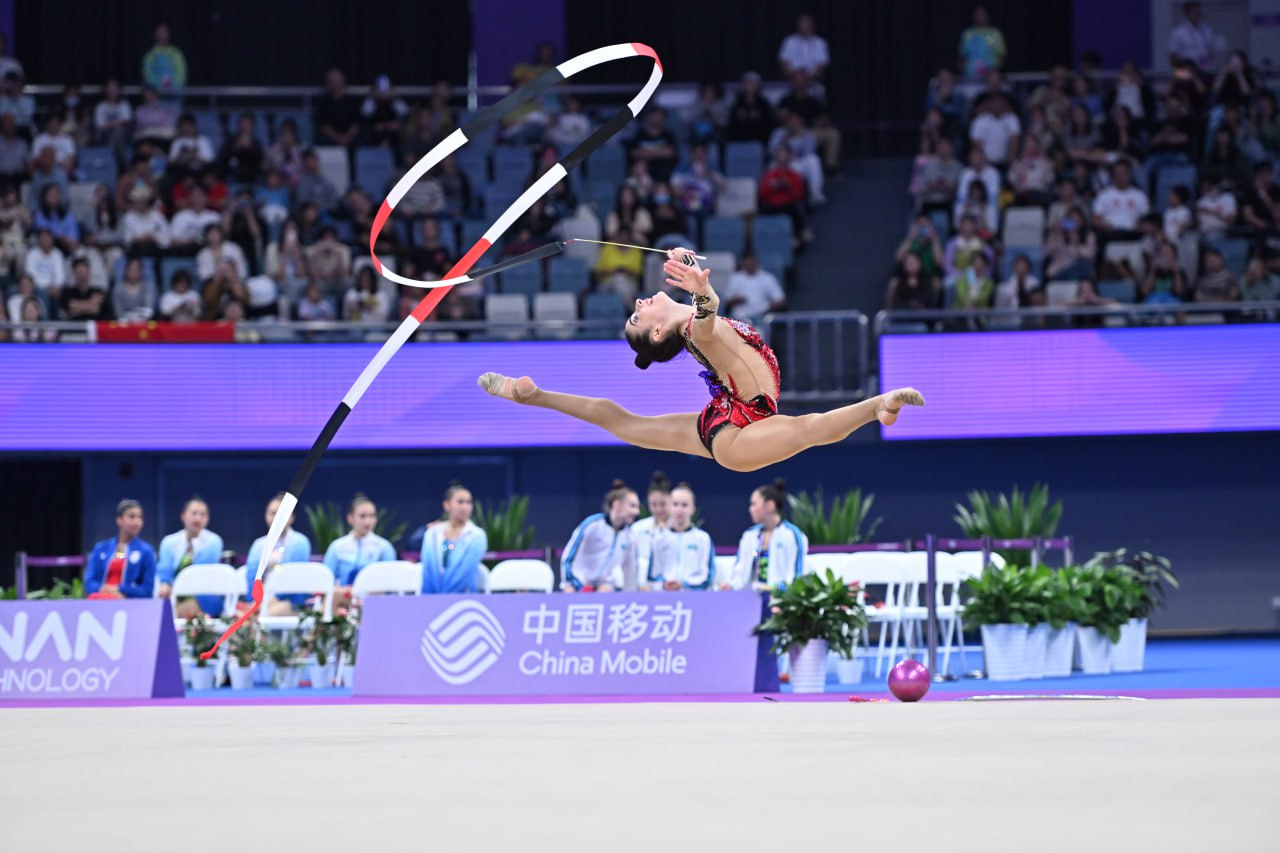
Atalyants competing her ribbon routine at the 2022 Asian Games

Year	Apparatus	Music title
2022	Hoop	Nostradamus by Royal Philharmonic Orchestra
2022	Ball	Venus by The Music Makers
2022	Clubs	"Let's Get It Started" by The Black Eyed Peas
2022	Ribbon	Pump It by Black Eyed Peas
2023	Hoop	"Immortal" by Thomas Bergersen, "March Of Khan (Polovtsian Dances)" by Cavendish Music, original by Alexander Borodin
2023	Ball	"Break Out", "Circle of Life (Remix)", "In Da Getto" by Swingrowers, District 78, J Balvin & Skrillex
2023	Ball (second)	"I Got You (I Feel Good)" by Jessie J
2023	Clubs	"Let's Get Retarded" by The Black Eyed Peas
2023	Clubs (second)	"Kooza Dance" by Cirque du Soleil
2023	Ribbon	"Demonic", "Matador (feat. Marano)" by Non-Stop Producer Series and Marnik
