= Milana Safina =

Uzbekistani rhythmic gymnast (born 2010)

- Born: 15 February 2010 (age 16) Tashkent

Gymnastics career
- Discipline: Rhythmic gymnastics
- Country represented: Uzbekistan; (2024-present)
Medal record
Representing Uzbekistan
Rhythmic gymnastics
Junior World Championships
Bronze medal – third place	2025 Sofia	Team
Asian Junior Championships
Gold medal – first place	2024 Tashkent	Group All-Around
Gold medal – first place	2024 Tashkent	5 Hoops
Gold medal – first place	2024 Tashkent	10 Clubs
Gold medal – first place	2025 Singapore	Group All-Around
Silver medal – second place	2025 Singapore	5 Hoops
Bronze medal – third place	2025 Singapore	10 Clubs

Milana Safina (born 15 February 2010) is an Uzbek rhythmic gymnast. She represents Uzbekistan in international competitions.

== Biography ==
In 2023 Safina won gold with 5 hoops at the Youth Cup of Uzbekistan. In May of the following year she was selected to compete at the 2024 Asian Championships along Fatima El Sankari, Alana Khafizova, Yosina Djuraeva, Kristina Shin and Ravshana Shaabdurakhmanova, winning gold in the All-Around, with 5 hoops and with 5 clubs.

In March 2025 she won bronze overall and silver with 10 clubs at the Sofia International Cup. In early May silver in the All-Around and gold with 5 hoops at the Shining star tournament. Later she competed in the Asian Championships in Singapore, winning gold in the All-Around and in the two event finals. In late June Djuraeva was selected for the 3rd Junior World Championships in Sofia, winning bronze in teams along groupmates Alana Khafizova, Zamira Khvalcheva, Yosina Djuraeva, Kristina Shin, Jasmine Yakhlakova and individuals Viktoriya Nikiforova and Sofiya Usova.
