= Aiym Meirzhanova =

Kazakhstani rhythmic gymnast

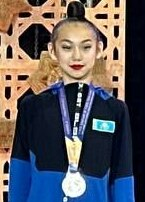
- Meirzhanova at the 2023 Junior Asian Championships

Personal information
- Born: 19 August 2008 (age 18) Kazakhstan

Gymnastics career
- Discipline: Rhythmic gymnastics
- Country represented: Kazakhstan (2022-present)
Medal record
Rhythmic gymnastics
Representing Kazakhstan
Asian Championships
| Silver medal – second place | 2025 Singapore | Team |
| Bronze medal – third place | 2025 Singapore | Clubs |
Junior Asian Championships
| Gold medal – first place | 2022 Pattaya | Team |
| Gold medal – first place | 2023 Manila | Ball |
| Silver medal – second place | 2023 Manila | Team |
| Silver medal – second place | 2023 Manila | Clubs |
| Silver medal – second place | 2023 Manila | Ribbon |
| Silver medal – second place | 2022 Pattaya | Clubs |

Aiym Meirzhanova (born 19 August 2008) is a Kazakh rhythmic gymnast. She won two medals at the 2025 Asian Championships. At the junior level, she is the 2023 Asian ball champion and a 2022 Asian team champion.

== Career ==
Meirzhanova began rhythmic gymnastics when she was four years old.

=== Junior ===
Meirzhanova won a silver medal in the ball final at the 2022 Asian Championships. In 2023, she competed at Miss Valentine, winning silver with ribbons and bronze with hoop. In March, she competed at the “Aphrodite Cup” in Athens, winning silver in the all-around and bronze with ribbon. At the Sofia Cup, she was 13th in the all-around, fifth with clubs and seventh with ribbon. At the 2023 Asian Championships, she won gold with ball, and silver medals in the team event, with clubs and ribbon. She was selected for the Junior World Championships in Cluj-Napoca and finished 16th with ball, 20th with clubs, 10th with ribbon and 9th in the team event.

=== Senior ===
Meirzhanova became age-eligible for senior international competitions in 2024. At the 2024 Bosphorus Cup in Istanbul, she won the all-around silver medal. Then in the event finals, she won a gold medal with the hoop and silver medals with the clubs and ribbon.

Meirzhanova competed at her first World Cup event at the 2025 Sofia World Cup and finished 16th in the all-around. Then at the stage in Tashkent, she finished eighth in the all-around. She advanced into the ball and ribbon finals, finishing fifth and seventh, respectively. She finished fifth in the all-around at the 2025 Asian Championships and won a silver medal in the team event. She finished fourth in hoop, ball, and ribbon event finals. In the clubs final, she won the bronze medal behind Takhmina Ikromova and Reina Matsusaka. She then won the all-around title at the Kazakhstan national championships.

She was selected to represent Kazakhstan alongside Aibota Yertaikyzy at the 2025 World Championships, in Rio de Janeiro, Brazil. They took 13th place in the team competition together with the senior group. She finished in 25th place in all-around qualifications.

In March 2026, she competed at Aphrodite Cup in Greece and took 6th place in all-around. She took 5th place in hoop final and won bronze medal in ribbon.

== Routine music information ==
| Year | Apparatus | Music title |
|---|---|---|
| 2026 | Hoop | More More More! (Encore) by Moulin Rouge! The Musical (Original Broadway Cast Recording) |
| 2026 | Ball | |
| 2026 | Clubs | |
| 2026 | Ribbon | |
| 2025 | Hoop | More More More! (Encore) by Moulin Rouge! The Musical (Original Broadway Cast Recording) |
| 2025 | Ball | Ai Coração by Mimicat |
| 2025 | Clubs | Prologue (From Raya and the Last Dragon) by James Newton Howard |
| 2025 | Ribbon | Requiem by Aram Mp3, Forsh |
