= 2026 Asian Rhythmic Gymnastics Championships =

Gymnastics event in Kyrgyzstan

2026 Asian Gymnastics Championships
- Venue: Zhashtyk
- Location: Bishkek, Kyrgyzstan
- Start date: 23 May 2026
- End date: 26 May 2026

The 17th Rhythmic Gymnastics Asian Championships and the 22nd Junior Asian Gymnastics Championships were held from 23 to 26 May 2025 in Bishkek, Kyrgyzstan.

== Medal winners ==
=== Senior ===
Event	Gold	Silver	Bronze
Team
Team	Uzbekistan; Senior Individual; Takhmina Ikromova; Anastasiya Sarantseva; Nataliya Usova; Senior Group; Evelina Atalyants; Mumtozabonu Iskhokzoda; Amaliya Mamedova; Yasmina Mkrtycheva; Yuliya Valevataya; Tamila Ziganshina	Kazakhstan; Senior Individual; Aibota Yertaikyzy; Akmaral Yerekesheva; Senior Group; Kristina Chepulskaya; Jasmine Junusbayeva; Aizere Kenges; Aida Khakimzhanova; Madina Myrzabay; Aizere Nurmagambetova	China; Senior Individual; Wang Qi; Wang Zilu; Senior Group; Ding Xinyi; Liu Miaoting; Pu Yanzhu; Wang Lanjing; Zhang Xinyi; Zhao Wanzhu
Individual Finals
All-Around	(Uzbekistan) Takhmina Ikromova	(Kazakhstan) Aibota Yertaikyzy	(Uzbekistan) Nataliya Usova
Hoop	(Uzbekistan) Takhmina Ikromova	(China) Wang Zilu	(Kazakhstan) Akmaral Yerekesheva
Ball	(Uzbekistan) Takhmina Ikromova	(China) Wang Zilu	(Kazakhstan) Akmaral Yerekesheva
Clubs	(Uzbekistan) Takhmina Ikromova	(Kazakhstan) Akmaral Yerekesheva	(Uzbekistan) Nataliya Usova
Ribbon	(Uzbekistan) Takhmina Ikromova	(Uzbekistan) Nataliya Usova	(Kazakhstan) Aibota Yertaikyzy
Group Finals
All-Around	Uzbekistan; Evelina Atalyants; Mumtozabonu Iskhokzoda; Amaliya Mamedova; Yasmina Mkrtycheva; Yuliya Valevataya; Tamila Ziganshina	China; Liu Miaoting; Pu Yanzhu; Wang Lanjing; Zhang Xinyi; Zhao Wanzhu	Kazakhstan; Kristina Chepulskaya; Jasmine Junusbayeva; Aizere Kenges; Aida Khakimzhanova; Madina Myrzabay; Aizere Nurmagambetova
5 Balls	China; Liu Miaoting; Pu Yanzhu; Wang Lanjing; Zhang Xinyi; Zhao Wanzhu	Kazakhstan; Kristina Chepulskaya; Jasmine Junusbayeva; Aizere Kenges; Aida Khakimzhanova; Madina Myrzabay; Aizere Nurmagambetova	South Korea; Habyn Cho; Suyeon Park; Minseul Kim; Jiwoo Kim; Ekaterina Yan; Jungeun Lee
3 Hoops & 2 Clubs	China; Liu Miaoting; Pu Yanzhu; Wang Lanjing; Zhang Xinyi; Zhao Wanzhu	Kazakhstan; Kristina Chepulskaya; Jasmine Junusbayeva; Aizere Kenges; Aida Khakimzhanova; Madina Myrzabay; Aizere Nurmagambetova	Japan; Sena Yamagishi; Riko Morishita; Karuna Tokozumi; Rika Nakamura; Airi Higashi; Hana Kumasaka

=== Junior ===
Event	Gold	Silver	Bronze
Team
Team	Uzbekistan; Junior Individual; Sabina Kagirova; Leysan Kuzmenko; Anora Mamadjanova; Yasmina Zufarova; Junior Group; Kamilla Astanova; Ornella Bikmaeva; Alisiya Galati; Safiya Pulatova; Zamira Khvalcheva; Farida Abdulova	Kazakhstan; Junior Individual; Anel Dinisheva; Anna Rubtsova; Aiganym Rysbek; Linara Zhallauova; Junior Group; Diana Bikhert; Zhasmin Kairzhanova; Kuralay Kuanysh; Illariya Kuryachenko; Yekaterina Pristennaya; Sabina Tyutebayeva	South Korea; Junior Individual; Haeun Jung; Juah Lee; Junior Group; Dasom Bae; Yiseo Hwang; Hayun Jung; Yeyoung Kim; Gayoon Lee; Jiho Yoo
Individual Finals
Hoop	(Kazakhstan) Linara Zhailauova	(China) Zhixuan Chen	(South Korea) Haeun Jung
Ball	(Uzbekistan) Sabina Kagirova	(Kazakhstan) Aiganym Rysbek	(South Korea) Juah Lee
Clubs	(Uzbekistan) Anora Mamadjanova	(Kazakhstan) Anna Rubtsova	(South Korea) Haeun Jung
Ribbon	(Kazakhstan) Anel Dinisheva	(Uzbekistan) Yasmina Zufarova	(Kyrgyzstan) Kanykei Stamalieva
Group Finals
All-Around	Uzbekistan; Kamilla Astanova; Ornella Bikmaeva; Alisiya Galati; Safiya Pulatova; Zamira Khvalcheva; Farida Abdulova	Kazakhstan; Diana Bikhert; Zhasmin Kairzhanova; Kuralay Kuanysh; Illariya Kuryachenko; Yekaterina Pristennaya; Sabina Tyutebayeva	Japan; Ria Adachi; Kako Ikeda; Mireya Ikeda; Haruka Takada; Sara Yamashita
5 Balls	Uzbekistan; Kamilla Astanova; Ornella Bikmaeva; Alisiya Galati; Safiya Pulatova; Zamira Khvalcheva; Farida Abdulova	Kazakhstan; Diana Bikhert; Zhasmin Kairzhanova; Kuralay Kuanysh; Illariya Kuryachenko; Yekaterina Pristennaya; Sabina Tyutebayeva	South Korea; Dasom Bae; Yiseo Hwang; Hayun Jung; Yeyoung Kim; Gayoon Lee; Jiho Yoo
5 Ribbons	Japan; Ria Adachi; Kako Ikeda; Mireya Ikeda; Haruka Takada; Sara Yamashita	Kazakhstan; Diana Bikhert; Zhasmin Kairzhanova; Kuralay Kuanysh; Illariya Kuryachenko; Yekaterina Pristennaya; Sabina Tyutebayeva	South Korea; Dasom Bae; Yiseo Hwang; Hayun Jung; Yeyoung Kim; Gayoon Lee; Jiho Yoo

== Results ==
=== Seniors ===
==== Individual qualification ====
The top 8 scores in individual apparatus qualify for the apparatus finals, and the top 18 in overall qualification scores advance to the all-around final.

Rank	Gymnast	Nation	Hoop (rhythmic gymnastics)	Ball (rhythmic gymnastics)	Clubs (rhythmic gymnastics)	Ribbon (rhythmic gymnastics)	Total	Q
1	Takhmina Ikromova	Uzbekistan	28.100 (1)	27.200 (2)	28.850 (1)	27.800 (1)	84.750	Q
2	Wang Zilu	China	26.900 (3)	26.450 (4)	27.600 (2)	26.800 (5)	81.300	Q
3	Aibota Yertaikyzy	Kazakhstan	26.200 (6)	26.500 (3)	26.900 (4)	27.600 (2)	81.000	Q
4	Akmaral Yerekesheva	Kazakhstan	27.150 (2)	25.750 (5)	26.600 (5)	27.000 (3)	80.750	Q
5	Nataliya Usova	Uzbekistan	25.950 (8)		27.000 (3)	26.900 (4)	79.850	Q
6	Wang Qi	China	26.750 (4)	25.300 (7)	26.100 (8)	25.900 (6)	78.750	Q
7	Mirano Kita	Japan	26.600 (5)	24.300 (12)	26.450 (6)	25.600 (8)	78.650	Q
8	Eunchae Seo	South Korea	26.150 (7)	25.600 (6)	25.100 (10)	25.350 (9)	77.100	Q
9	Asel Arapova	Kyrgyzstan	24.600 (11)	24.000 (14)	25.500 (9)	25.650 (7)	75.750	Q
10	Zlata Arkatova	Kyrgyzstan	24.550 (13)	25.300 (8)	24.400 (12)	25.000 (10)	74.850	Q
11	Naruha Suzuki	Japan	18.850 (27)	24.450 (10)	26.350 (7)	23.950 (11)	74.750	Q
12	Mikayla Angeline Yang	Singapore	25.500 (9)	24.300 (13)	24.400 (11)	21.350 )16)	74.200	Q
13	Jasmine Ramilo	Philippines	25.450 (10)	24.350 (11)	23.300 (15)	22.450 (14)	73.100	Q
14	Pebbyl Jing Ya Ang	Singapore	24.600 (12)	23.700 (15)	24.300 (13)	22.050 (15)	72.600	Q
15	Breanna Labadan	Philippines	24.000 (14)		24.300 (14)	23.250 (12)	71.550	Q
16	Ha Su-yi	South Korea	22.800 (15)	24.650 (9)	20.050 (27)	22.550 (13)	70.000	Q
17	Sitanan Eakbunnasing	Thailand	21.650 (16)	19.750 (20)	23.000 (16)	20.750 (18)	65.400	Q
18	Praewa Misato Philaphandeth	Laos	21.200 (19)	19.950 (19)	21.750 (18)	20.650 (19)	63.600	Q
19	Lai Yi-Tong	Chinese Taipei	21.650 (17)		21.650 (20)	18.900 (23)	62.200	
20	Tri Wahyuni	Indonesia	19.950 (23)	20.050 (18)	21.700 (19)	18.650 (25)	61.700	
21	Sikharee Sutthiragsa	Thailand	19.400 (24)	18.750 (26)	20.900 (22)	21.250 (17)	61.550	
22	Parina Rahul Madanpotra	India	21.500 (18)		20.400 (25)	19.350 (21)	61.250	
23	Ting Huen Li	Hong Kong	20.400 (20)	19.150 (24)	20.800 (23)	18.600 (26)	60.350	
24	Ka Yi Hung	Hong Kong	18.800 (28)	21.150 (17)	19.400 (28)	19.500 (20)	60.050	
25	Ya-Yun Chiang	Chinese Taipei		19.200 (23)	21.100 (21)	19.300 (22)	59.600	
26	Kimaya Karle	India	18.240 (29)	18.650 (27)	22.300 (17)		59.190	
27	Urangoo Namkhaibayar	Mongolia	20.250 (21)	17.350 (28)	20.450 (24)	18.300 (29)	59.000	
28	Elissar Hanounik	Syria	19.050 (26)	19.350 (21)	20.400 (26)	18.55 (27)	58.800	
29	Talya Elkhayat	Syria	19.250 (25)	14.550 (29)	18.150 (30)	18.750 (24)	56.150	
30	Tserenkhand Boldbaatar	Mongolia	20.150 (22)	13.750 (31)	18.200 (29)	15.200 (30)	53.550	
31	Luna Birjawi	Lebanon	15.800 (31)	13.950 (30)	16.200 (31)	12.950 (32)	45.950	
32	Shubhashree Udaysing More	India		19.150 (25)		18.450 (28)	37.600	
33	Kuo Shu-Hui	Chinese Taipei	15.900 (30)	21.400 (16)			37.300	
34	Christine Ajjour	Lebanon	13.500 (32)			14.100 (31)	27.600	
35	Anastasiya Sarantseva	Uzbekistan		27.350 (1)			27.350	
36	Yara Semaan	Lebanon		12.300 (32)	13.950 (32)		26.250	
37	Anja Christine Schiwek	Philippines		19.250 (22)			19.250	

==== All-around final ====
Rank	Gymnast	Nation	Hoop (rhythmic gymnastics)	Ball (rhythmic gymnastics)	Clubs (rhythmic gymnastics)	Ribbon (rhythmic gymnastics)	Total
1st place, gold medalist(s)	Takhmina Ikromova	Uzbekistan	29.450	29.100	28.350	28.200	115.100
2nd place, silver medalist(s)	Aibota Yertaikyzy	Kazakhstan	28.500	27.450	28.700	29.000	113.650
3rd place, bronze medalist(s)	Nataliya Usova	Uzbekistan	28.700	27.800	27.900	28.000	112.400
4	Wang Qi	China	28.500	27.000	28.800	27.900	112.200
5	Wang Zilu	China	28.650	27.500	28.150	27.750	112.050
6	Akmaral Yerekesheva	Kazakhstan	28.650	27.100	28.700	27.450	111.900
7	Eunchae Seo	South Korea	27.400	25.850	27.400	25.000	105.650
8	Zlata Arkatova	Kyrgyzstan	25.800	24.550	26.850	26.100	103.300
9	Mirano Kita	Japan	26.700	26.100	24.750	25.650	103.200
10	Asel Arapova	Kyrgyzstan	24.550	24.850	25.850	25.700	100.950
11	Ha Su-yi	South Korea	24.600	24.150	23.550	25.200	97.500
12	Mikayla Angeline Yang	Singapore	25.050	24.600	25.900	21.600	97.150
13	Jasmine Ramilo	Philippines	25.400	22.250	25.850	21.350	94.850
14	Pebbyl Jing Ya Ang	Singapore	23.450	22.750	22.750	22.450	91.400
15	Naruha Suzuki	Japan	24.600	19.650	25.350	21.400	91.000
16	Breanna Labadan	Philippines	24.550	20.450	23.450	22.400	90.850
17	Praewa Misato Philaphandeth	Laos	21.450	21.500	21.850	22.300	87.100
18	Sitanan Eakbunnasing	Thailand	22.000	20.700	20.850	21.750	85.300

==== Hoop ====
Rank	Gymnast	Nation	Total
1st place, gold medalist(s)	Takhmina Ikromova	Uzbekistan	29.250
2nd place, silver medalist(s)	Wang Zilu	China	28.900
3rd place, bronze medalist(s)	Akmaral Yerekesheva	Kazakhstan	28.500
4	Wang Qi	China	28.300
5	Nataliya Usova	Uzbekistan	28.150
6	Aibota Yertaikyzy	Kazakhstan	28.050
7	Eunchae Seo	South Korea	28.050
8	Mirano Kita	Japan	27.350

==== Ball ====
Rank	Gymnast	Nation	Total
1st place, gold medalist(s)	Takhmina Ikromova	Uzbekistan	29.050
2nd place, silver medalist(s)	Wang Zilu	China	27.600
3rd place, bronze medalist(s)	Akmaral Yerekesheva	Kazakhstan	27.550
4	Zlata Arkatova	Kyrgyzstan	27.050
5	Eunchae Seo	South Korea	26.950
6	Wang Qi	China	26.900
7	Anastasiya Sarantseva	Uzbekistan	25.150
8	Aibota Yertaikyzy	Kazakhstan	24.150

==== Clubs ====
Rank	Gymnast	Nation	Total
1st place, gold medalist(s)	Takhmina Ikromova	Uzbekistan	29.750
2nd place, silver medalist(s)	Akmaral Yerekesheva	Kazakhstan	28.650
3rd place, bronze medalist(s)	Nataliya Usova	Uzbekistan	28.300
4	Aibota Yertaikyzy	Kazakhstan	27.550
5	Naruha Suzuki	Japan	27.350
6	Wang Qi	China	27.300
7	Mirano Kita	Japan	25.350
8	Wang Zilu	China	24.500

==== Ribbon ====
Rank	Gymnast	Nation	Total
1st place, gold medalist(s)	Takhmina Ikromova	Uzbekistan	28.450
2nd place, silver medalist(s)	Nataliya Usova	Uzbekistan	28.350
3rd place, bronze medalist(s)	Aibota Yertaikyzy	Kazakhstan	27.850
4	Akmaral Yerekesheva	Kazakhstan	27.150
5	Mirano Kita	Japan	27.000
6	Wang Zilu	China	26.950
7	Asel Arapova	Kyrgyzstan	25.550
8	Wang Qi	China	25.150

==== Group qualifications ====
The top 8 scores in group apparatus qualify for the apparatus finals, and the top 8 in overall qualification scores advance to the all-around final.

Rank	Nation	5	3 + 2	Total	Q
1	China	24.700 (1)	26.350 (1)	51.050	Q
2	Kazakhstan	24.650 (2)	25.300 (2)	49.950	Q
3	South Korea	24.250 (3)	23.650 (5)	47.900	Q
4	Japan	23.350 (4)	24.150 (4)	47.500	Q
5	Uzbekistan	22.100 (5)	24.550 (3)	46.650	Q
6	Chinese Taipei	21.550 (7)	19.150 (6)	40.700	Q
7	Malaysia	21.600 (6)	18.400 (7)	40.000	Q
8	Kyrgyzstan	20.550 (8)	17.400 (9)	37.950	Q
9	Thailand	19.950 (9)	17.450 (8)	37.400	
10	Singapore	16.100 (10)	16.500 (10)	32.600	

==== Group all-around final ====
Place	Nation	5	3 + 2	Total
1st place, gold medalist(s)	Uzbekistan	26.800	27.150	53.950
2nd place, silver medalist(s)	China	25.400	28.400	53.800
3rd place, bronze medalist(s)	Kazakhstan	25.950	26.900	52.850
4	South Korea	24.800	26.100	50.900
5	Japan	24.450	23.950	48.400
6	Chinese Taipei	21.000	19.450	40.450
7	Malaysia	19.900	17.300	37.200
8	Kyrgyzstan	18.350	17.150	35.500

==== 5 Balls ====
Rank	Nation	Total
1st place, gold medalist(s)	China	27.950
2nd place, silver medalist(s)	Kazakhstan	26.300
3rd place, bronze medalist(s)	South Korea	25.350
4	Uzbekistan	24.550
5	Japan	24.150
6	Kyrgyzstan	21.600
7	Chinese Taipei	20.550
8	Malaysia	18.000

==== 3 Hoops + 2 Clubs ====
Rank	Nation	Total
1st place, gold medalist(s)	China	29.250
2nd place, silver medalist(s)	Kazakhstan	27.000
3rd place, bronze medalist(s)	Japan	24.200
4	Uzbekistan	24.150
5	Malaysia	22.400
6	South Korea	21.750
7	Chinese Taipei	20.500
8	Thailand	19.150

=== Junior ===
A total of 41 gymnasts competed in the junior individual qualifications, with the top 8 on each apparatus advancing into the finals.

==== Hoop ====
Rank	Gymnast	Nation	Total
1st place, gold medalist(s)	Linara Zhailauova	Kazakhstan	25.200
2nd place, silver medalist(s)	Chen Zhixuan	China	25.150
3rd place, bronze medalist(s)	Jung Hae-un	South Korea	24.700
4	Leysan Kuzmenko	Uzbekistan	23.300
5	Li Arissa	Chinese Taipei	22.950
6	Lydia Huien Lim	Singapore	22.200
7	Sofiia Iarovaia	Kyrgyzstan	20.750
8	Poe Syuen Wong	Malaysia	19.500

==== Ball ====
Rank	Gymnast	Nation	Total
1st place, gold medalist(s)	Sabina Kagirova	Uzbekistan	25.550
2nd place, silver medalist(s)	Aiganym Rysbek	Kazakhstan	24.050
3rd place, bronze medalist(s)	Lee Ju-ah	South Korea	23.200
4	Avery Wen Xuan Tan	Singapore	22.150
5	Chen Zhixuan	China	22.050
6	Nailia Omurbekova	Kyrgyzstan	21.900
7	An Igarashi	Japan	21.150
8	Yoong Bei Ru	Malaysia	18.000

==== Clubs ====
Rank	Gymnast	Nation	Total
1st place, gold medalist(s)	Anora Mamadjanova	Uzbekistan	25.350
2nd place, silver medalist(s)	Anna Rubtsova	Kazakhstan	25.200
3rd place, bronze medalist(s)	Jung Hae-un	South Korea	23.400
4	Chen Zhixuan	China	23.250
5	Sofiia Iarovaia	Kyrgyzstan	22.900
6	Lydia Huien Lim	Singapore	22.700
7	Maral Batjargal	Mongolia	20.800
8	Luna Otsuka	Japan	20.300

==== Ribbon ====
Rank	Gymnast	Nation	Total
1st place, gold medalist(s)	Anel Dinisheva	Kazakhstan	24.600
2nd place, silver medalist(s)	Yasmina Zufarova	Uzbekistan	24.400
3rd place, bronze medalist(s)	Kanykei Stamalieva	Kyrgyzstan	24.250
4	Chen Zhixuan	China	23.200
5	Lee Ju-ah	South Korea	22.750
6	An Igarashi	Japan	22.450
7	Rhea Dhaliwall	Malaysia	22.100
8	Avery Wen Xuan Tan	Singapore	20.900

==== Groups all-around ====
As only 7 groups competed in the junior qualification, all groups advanced into the all-around and apparatus finals.

Rank	Nation	5	5	Total
1st place, gold medalist(s)	Uzbekistan	21.500 (1)	23.850 (1)	45.350
2nd place, silver medalist(s)	Kazakhstan	19.700 (2)	23.000 (2)	42.700
3rd place, bronze medalist(s)	Japan	17.100 (3)	16.850 (5)	33.950
4	Chinese Taipei	13.200 (5)	19.550 (3)	32.750
5	South Korea	14.200 (4)	18.000 (4)	32.200
6	Kyrgyzstan	11.350 (6)	14.550 (6)	25.900
7	Mongolia	8.350 (7)	14.400 (7)	22.750

==== 5 Ribbons ====
Rank	Nation	Total
1st place, gold medalist(s)	Japan	19.800
2nd place, silver medalist(s)	Kazakhstan	19.600
3rd place, bronze medalist(s)	South Korea	18.750
4	Uzbekistan	18.250
5	Chinese Taipei	14.800
6	Kyrgyzstan	14.450
7	Mongolia	12.050

==== 5 Balls ====
Rank	Nation	Total
1st place, gold medalist(s)	Uzbekistan	23.950
2nd place, silver medalist(s)	Kazakhstan	21.850
3rd place, bronze medalist(s)	South Korea	21.400
4	Kyrgyzstan	20.550
5	Japan	18.650
6	Chinese Taipei	18.000
7	Mongolia	17.950

== Overall medal table ==
* Host nation (Kyrgyzstan)

Rank	Nation	Gold	Silver	Bronze	Total
1	Uzbekistan	12	2	2	16
2	Kazakhstan	2	11	4	17
3	China	2	4	1	7
4	Japan	1	0	2	3
5	South Korea	0	0	7	7
6	Kyrgyzstan*	0	0	1	1
Totals (6 entries)		17	17	17	51
