= Anastasiya Sarantseva =

Uzbekistani rhythmic gymnast (born 2008)

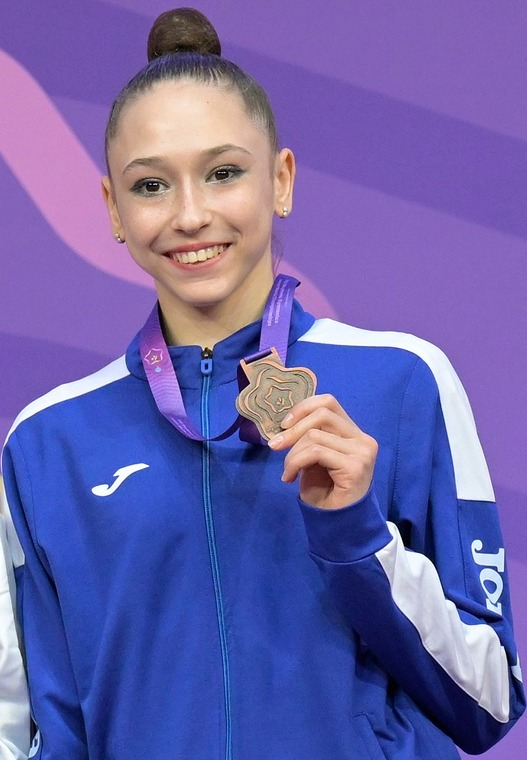

Personal information
- Full name: Anastasiya Olegovna Sarantseva
- Born: 7 December 2008 (age 17) Tashkent, Uzbekistan

Gymnastics career
- Discipline: Rhythmic gymnastics
- Country represented: Uzbekistan; (2023-present)
Medal record
| Event | 1st | 2nd | 3rd |
|---|---|---|---|
| Asian Championships | 5 | 1 | 2 |
| World Cup | 0 | 2 | 1 |
| Total | 5 | 3 | 3 |
Representing Uzbekistan
Rhythmic gymnastics
Asian Championships
| Gold medal – first place | 2023 Manila | Team |
| Gold medal – first place | 2023 Manila | Hoop |
| Gold medal – first place | 2025 Singapore | Team |
| Gold medal – first place | 2025 Singapore | Ball |
| Gold medal – first place | 2026 Bishkek | Team |
| Silver medal – second place | 2025 Singapore | All-Around |
| Bronze medal – third place | 2022 Pattaya | Ball |
| Bronze medal – third place | 2025 Singapore | Hoop |
Junior World Championships
| Bronze medal – third place | 2023 Cluj-Napoca | Hoop |
- Last updated on: 25 May 2026.

Anastasiya Olegovna Sarantseva (born 7 December 2008) is an Uzbekistani rhythmic gymnast. She is the 2023 junior Asian champion with hoop.

== Career ==
=== Junior ===
Sarantseva competed as a junior at the 2022 Asian Championships. She competed with ball only and won a bronze in the final. The Uzbekistan team won silver in the team competition.

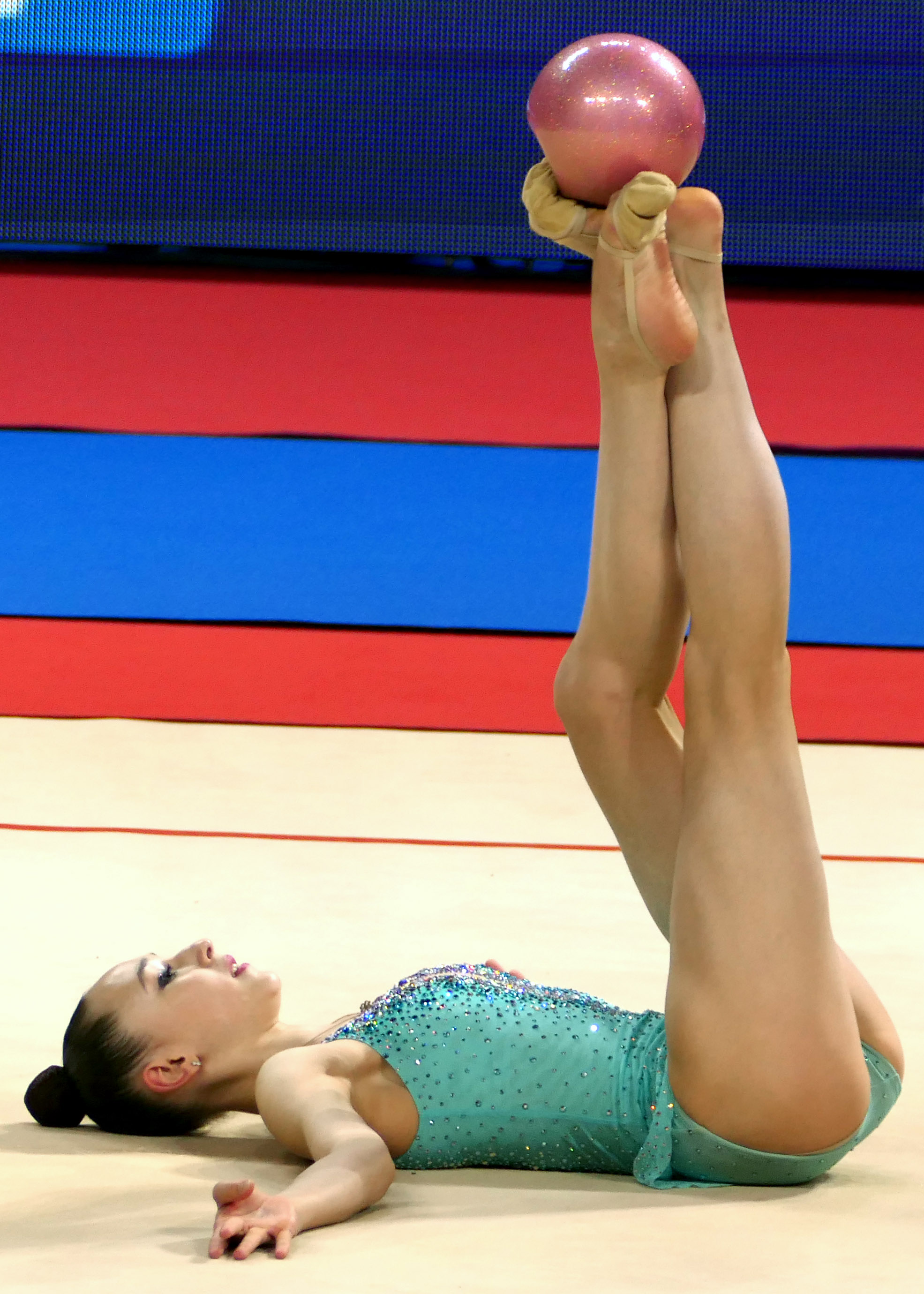
Sarantseva competing at the 2024 Sofia World Cup

In 2023, Sarantseva was again selected for the junior Asian Championships in Manila, where she won gold with hoop. In July she won bronze with the same apparatus at the Junior World Championships in Cluj-Napoca. Along with Mishel Nesterova's bronze medal in ribbon, it was the first time a gymnast representing Uzbekistan had won a World Championships medal at either the junior or senior level.

=== Senior ===
In 2024 she had her senior international debut at the Gymnastik International in Germany, where she won silver in the all-around behind Daniela Munits from Israel and silver in the ribbon final. She also competed in the World Cup in Sofia, where she placed 19th in the all-around, and in the World Cup Baku, where she placed 22nd. In both events, she was the second reserve for the ribbon final. In May, she competed at the 2024 Asian Championships, which were held in her hometown of Tashkent. She competed with ball and ribbon only and made the finals for both; in each final, she placed 5th. She won gold in the team competition along with Takhmina Ikromova, Nataliya Usova, and the senior group.

Sarantseva began her 2025 season in March, when she took 5th place overall in the Thiais Grand Prix. On 25–27 April, she competed at the World Cup Tashkent, where she took 4th place in the all-around. She won silver medals in the hoop and clubs finals and a bronze in ball. In May, she won the silver medal at the 2025 Asian Championships in Singapore behind teammate Takhmina Ikromova. She also won gold in team and ball and bronze in hoop. On July 18-20, she competed at the World Cup Milan and took 7th place in the all-around. She qualified to the ball final, placing 8th.

In August, she competed at her first World Championships, held in Rio de Janeiro, Brazil, where she took 19th place in all-around qualifications and did not advance into the all-around final. She qualified to the ribbon final.

In May 2026, she competed only with ball at the 2026 Asian Championships in Bishkek, contributing to the team gold medal together with Takhmina Ikromova, Nataliya Usova and the senior group.

== Routine music information ==
| Year | Apparatus | Music Title |
|---|---|---|
| 2026 | Hoop | |
| 2026 | Ball | |
| 2026 | Clubs | |
| 2026 | Ribbon | |
| 2025 | Hoop | Dark Scrape Horror by FreshmanSound, The Code by Nemo |
| 2025 | Ball | Seven Nation Army by SKÁLD |
| 2025 | Clubs | Asereje (Hippy) by Las Ketchup |
| 2025 | Ribbon | I Can Do Anything / Finale by Christopher Lennertz |
| 2024 | Hoop | Illumination by Jennifer Thomas, Earth and Fire by Udi Harpaz & Ron Klein |
| 2024 | Ball | Weather Storm by Craig Armstrong |
| 2024 | Clubs | Rabiosa (Feat. Pitbull) by Shakira |
| 2024 | Ribbon | Arrasando by Thalia |
| 2023 | Hoop | Illumination by Jennifer Thomas, Earth and Fire by Udi Harpaz & Ron Klein |
| 2023 | Ball | |
| 2023 | Clubs | |
| 2023 | Ribbon | |
