= Eunchae Seo =

South Korean rhythmic gymnast (born 2010)

Seo Eun-chae
- Full name: 서은채
- Born: 11 April 2010 (age 16) South Korea

Gymnastics career
- Discipline: Rhythmic gymnastics
- Country represented: South Korea; (2025-present)
Medal record
Representing South Korea
Rhythmic gymnastics
Asian Junior Championships
| Bronze medal – third place | 2025 Singapore | Team |

Seo Eun-chae (Korean: 서은채; born 11 April 2010) is an individual South Korean rhythmic gymnast.

== Career ==
=== Junior ===
She competed at the 2025 Asian Junior Championships in Singapore. Together with teammates Haeun Jung, Juah Lee and junior group she took bronze medal in team competition. She was 5th in hoop and 4th in clubs final. In June, she was selected to compete at the 2025 Junior World Championships in Sofia, Bulgaria. She took 9th place in clubs, 11th in ribbon and 25th in hoop.

=== Senior ===
Eun-chae made her senior debut in 2026, competing at International Tournament Miss Valentine in Tartu. She won silver medal in clubs final, took 4th place in hoop and ball and 7th in ribbon final. In March, she competed at International Tournament Aphrodite Cup in Greece, and took 5th place in all-around. She won gold medal in hoop final in front of Dara Stoyanova and Andreea Verdes. The same month, she made her World Cup debut at Sofia World Cup, taking 31st place in all-around. Next, she competed at Tashkent World Cup, where she took 25th place in all-around. She almost qualified to hoop final (9th place). In May, she was selected to compete at the 2026 Asian Championships in Bishkek, Kyrgyzystan. She was 7th in all-around and hoop final, and 5th in ball. She and her teammate Ha Su-yi took 5th place in team competition. In August, she represented South Korea at the 2026 World Championships in Frankfurt, Germany. She ended on 27th place in all-around qualifications. She took 23rd place with hoop and 18th place with ball.

== Routine music information ==
| Year | Apparatus | Music title |
2026
| 2026 | Hoop | The Tempest by Gabriel Saban |
| 2026 | Ball | Chrono by Mammoth |
| 2026 | Clubs | Tomb by Elephant Music |
| 2026 | Ribbon | Your Idol by Saja Boys |
2025
| 2025 | Hoop | LOVE BOMB by MARVIN BROOKS 2WEI, JOZNEZ, KATAEM |
| 2025 | Ball | |
| 2025 | Clubs | Tomb by Elephant Music |
| 2025 | Ribbon | No Roots (Workout Remix) by Power Music Workout |
