= Daria Grokhotova =

Belarusian rhythmic gymnast

- Born: 22 November 2007 (age 18) Barnaul, Russia

Gymnastics career
- Discipline: Rhythmic gymnastics
- Country represented: Belarus Authorised Neutral Athletes (since 2024); (2020-)
- Club: Dinamo
- Head coach: Irina Leparskaya
- Assistant coach: Yulia Bichun-Komarova
- Retired: yes
Medal record
Event	1st	2nd	3rd
FIG World Cup	0	0	1
Total	0	0	1

Daria Grokhotova (Belarusian: Дарья Грохотова; born 22 November 2007) is an individual rhythmic gymnast who represents Belarus on international level.

== Career ==
Daria began rhythmic gymnastics at the age of 3 in her hometown of Barnaul, Russia.

=== Junior ===
She won bronze medal in all-around and clubs, silver in rope and gold in ball at the 2020 Belarusian National Championships.

=== Senior ===
In 2024, FIG allowed Belarusian athletes to compete under a neutral flag, but only as individual gymnasts, not in groups. She competed at the Bosphorus Cup in Istanbul, winning gold in all-around, clubs and ribbon. She was selected to represent Belarus at the 2024 BRICS Games. She won bronze medals in hoop and ribbon finals.

In 2025, she made her World Cup debut at the Tashkent World Cup in April. She took 13th place in all-around, 8th in the ribbon final and won bronze in the hoop final.

== Routine music information ==
Year	Apparatus	Music title
2026	Hoop	
2026	Ball	Besame Mucho (Buleria) by Jin Oki
2026	Clubs	Midas by Tanxugueiras
2026	Ribbon	
2025	Hoop	Kickoff by Josh Leake
2025	Ball	Besame Mucho (Buleria) by Jin Oki
2025	Clubs	
2025	Ribbon	
