= Nataliya Usova =

Uzbekistani rhythmic gymnast (born 2008)

- Наталья Усова
- Born: 9 June 2008 (age 18) Tashkent, Uzbekistan

Gymnastics career
- Discipline: Rhythmic gymnastics
- Country represented: Uzbekistan; (2022-present)
Medal record
Representing Uzbekistan
Rhythmic gymnastics
Event	1st	2nd	3rd
Asian Championships	3	3	2
FIG World Cup	0	0	1
Total	3	3	3
Asian Championships
Gold medal – first place	2024 Tashkent	Team
Gold medal – first place	2025 Singapore	Team
Gold medal – first place	2026 Bishkek	Team
Silver medal – second place	2024 Tashkent	Clubs
Silver medal – second place	2025 Singapore	Ribbon
Silver medal – second place	2026 Bishkek	Ribbon
Bronze medal – third place	2026 Bishkek	All-Around
Bronze medal – third place	2026 Bishkek	Clubs
Asian Junior Championships
Gold medal – first place	2022 Pattaya	Hoop
Gold medal – first place	2023 Manila	Team
Silver medal – second place	2022 Pattaya	Team
Silver medal – second place	2023 Manila	Ball

Nataliya Usova (Uzbek: Наталья Усова; born 9 June 2008) is an Uzbek rhythmic gymnast. She is a multiple-time Asian Championships medalist.

== Personal life ==
She has a brother and an older sister who are also involved in sports, and her younger sister Sofiya is also an internationally competitive rhythmic gymnast.

== Career ==
=== Junior ===
In December 2021, Usova was chosen to represent Uzbekistan in the first edition of an experimental competition organized by Alina Kabaeva called "Divine Grace", where gymnasts competed under the codes of points from 2000 to 2004 and 2022-2024.

In 2022, Usova competed at the Asian Championships, winning silver in teams and becoming the junior champion with the hoop.

The following year, she was again selected for the Asian Championships, where she won gold in teams and silver with ball. In July, she competed at the 2nd Junior World Championships in Cluj-Napoca, finishing 6th in teams and 7th in the ball final.

=== Senior ===
In 2024, she began competing as a senior. In April, she was the runner-up behind Takhmina Ikromova in her first senior Uzbekistan National Championships. In mid-April, she participated in her first senior international competition, the World Cup Baku, where she placed 12th in the all-around and was eighth in the ribbon final. She finished 29th in the all-around but won a bronze medal in the clubs final at the Tashkent World Cup.

She competed at the Asian Championships in May, where she won a gold medal in the team competition with her teammates Ikromova and the senior group. Individually, she won a silver medal with clubs.

In March 2025, she competed at the Gymnastik International in Fellbach, where she won the bronze all-around medal behind Anastasia Simakova and Liliana Lewińska. She also won a gold medal in the hoop final and a bronze medal with clubs. She next competed at the World Cup in Sofia, where she placed 39th in the all-around. At the 2025 Asian Championships in May, she only competed with ribbon. She qualified for the final and won the silver medal.

In 2026, she competed at the World Cup in Sofia, where she ended on 21st place in all-around. She qualified to ribbon final, finishing on 8th place. At the 2026 Asian Championships in May, she won gold medal in team competition alongside Ikromova, Sarantseva and senior group. She also won bronze medal in all-around behind Aibota Yertaikyzy. In apparatus finals, she took silver with ribbon, bronze with clubs and 5th place with hoop.

== Routine music information ==
Year	Apparatus	Music Title
2026	Hoop	Undone (feat. Fleurie) by Tommee Profitt
2026	Ball	Come Live Your Life With Me (Album Version) by Peter Cincotti / Parla Più Piano (El Padrino) by Filippa Giordano
2026	Clubs	Ilusión by Manolo Carrasco
2026	Ribbon	
2025	Hoop	Night of Terror (From "Black Swan"/Score) by Clint Mansell
2025	Ball	Come Live Your Life With Me (Album Version) by Peter Cincotti / Parla Più Piano (El Padrino) by Filippa Giordano
2025	Clubs	Ilusión by Manolo Carrasco
2025	Ribbon	
