= Aizere Kenges =

Kazakh rhythmic gymnast (born 2007)

- Айзере Кенгес
- Born: 11 December 2007 (age 18)

Gymnastics career
- Discipline: Rhythmic gymnastics
- Country represented: Kazakhstan; (2025-present)
- Club: Sports School of Olympic Reserve No.1
- Head coach: Meruyert Balginbayeva
Medal record
Rhythmic gymnastics
Representing Kazakhstan
Event	1st	2nd	3rd
FIG World Cup	0	1	2
Total	0	1	2
Asian Championships
Gold medal – first place	2025 Singapore	All-Around
Gold medal – first place	2025 Singapore	3 Balls & 2 Hoops
Silver medal – second place	2025 Singapore	Team
Silver medal – second place	2025 Singapore	5 Ribbons
Silver medal – second place	2026 Bishkek	Team
Silver medal – second place	2026 Bishkek	5 Balls
Silver medal – second place	2026 Bishkek	3 Hoops & 2 Clubs

Aizere Kenges (Kazakh: Айзере Кенгес; born 11 December 2007) is a Kazakh rhythmic gymnast. She represents Kazakhstan in international competitions as part of the national group.

== Biography ==
Kenges was called up to form the new Kazakh senior group in 2025. She made her debut in March at the Aphrodite Cup in Athens, winning the All-Around. In April the group took part in the World Cup in Baku, finishing 8th overall, 11th with 3 balls & 2 hoops and winning bronze with 5 ribbons. A week later, in Tashkent, they won again bronze with 5 ribbons while taking 5th place in the All-Around and 5th in the mixed final. In May it was announced that she had been called up to compete at the Asian Championships. In Singapore the group won gold in the All-Around and with 3 balls & 2 hoops, silver in teams and with 5 ribbons. At the end of the month she and her group mates won nationals among groups. In July she participated in the World Cup in Cluj-Napoca, being 13th overall, 14th with 5 ribbons and 11th with 3 balls & 2 hoops. In August, she competed at the 2025 World Championships in Rio de Janeiro, alongside Kristina Chepulskaya, Jasmine Junusbayeva, Aida Khakimzhanova, Madina Myrzabay and Aizere Nurmagambetova. They were 17th in All-Around, 18th with 5 ribbons and 14th with 3 balls & 2 hoops.

In 2026, the team won silver medal in all-around at Tashkent World Cup. They finished 5th in 5 balls final. In May, they competed at the 2026 Asian Championships in Bishkek, Kyrgyzstan. They won bronze medal in group all-around and silver in team competition and both apparatus finals. In July, they ended on 15th place in all-around at Milan World Cup. In August, Kristina was selected to represent Kazakhstan at the 2026 World Championships in Frankfurt, Germany, alongside Kristina Chepulskaya, Jasmine Junusbayeva, Aida Khakimzhanova, Madina Myrzabay and Aizere Nurmagambetova. They finished on 13th place in all-around and 11th place in team competition with individuals.
