= Leila Vasileva =

Russian artistic gymnast

- Лейла Васильева
- Born: December 9, 2007 (age 18)

Gymnastics career
- Discipline: Women's artistic gymnastics
- Country represented: Russia (2019–present)
Medal record
Representing (Individual Neutral Athletes) AIN
FIG World Cup
Event	1st	2nd	3rd
Apparatus World Cup	0	1	0

Leila Vasileva (Russian: Лейла Дмитриевна Васильева; born 9 December 2007) is a Russian artistic gymnast. She is the 2023 and 2024 Russian national bronze medalist on floor.

== Gymnastics career ==
Vasileva competed as an Individual Neutral Athlete (AIN) at the 2025 World Artistic Gymnastics Championships. She competed on uneven bars in the qualification round, making the uneven bars final and ultimately finishing in sixth place.
