= Aibota Yertaikyzy =

Kazakh rhythmic gymnast

Aibota Ertaiqyzy
- Айбота Ертайқызы
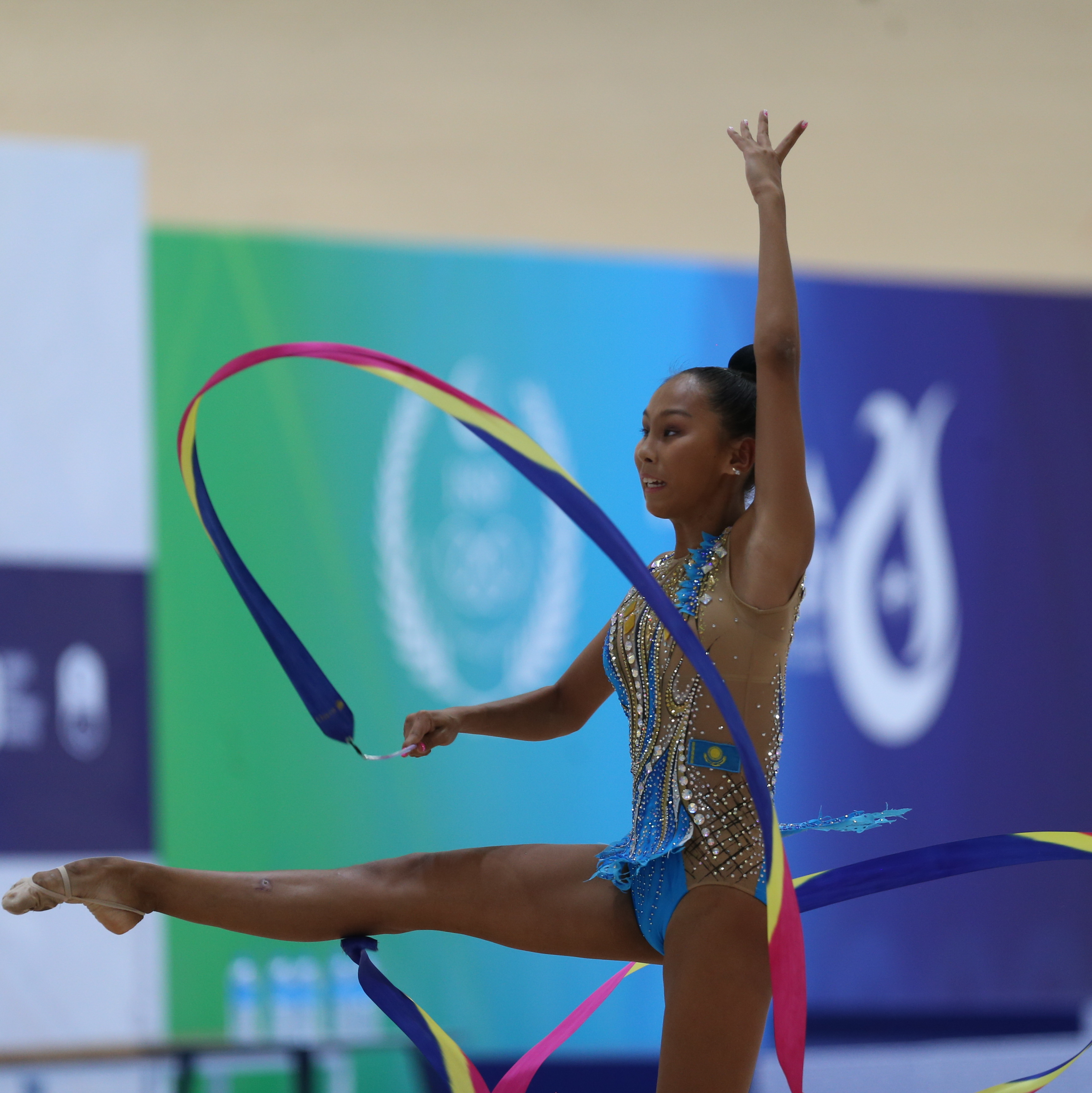
- Aibota in 2022

Personal information
- Born: 28 March 2004 (age 22) Kazakhstan

Gymnastics career
- Discipline: Rhythmic gymnastics
- Country represented: Kazakhstan; (2021-present)
- Club: Specialised Youth Sports School of Olympic Reserve No.1
- Head coach: Yekaterina Panchenko
- Assistant coach: Aliya Yussupova
Medal record
Rhythmic gymnastics
Representing Kazakhstan
Event	1st	2nd	3rd
Asian Championships	2	6	3
FIG World Cup	0	1	2
Grand Prix	0	5	2
Summer Universiade	0	0	1
Total	2	12	8
Asian Championships
Gold medal – first place	2024 Tashkent	Ribbon
Gold medal – first place	2025 Singapore	Ribbon
Silver medal – second place	2022 Pattaya	Team
Silver medal – second place	2023 Manila	Team
Silver medal – second place	2024 Tashkent	Ball
Silver medal – second place	2025 Singapore	Team
Silver medal – second place	2026 Bishkek	Team
Silver medal – second place	2026 Bishkek	All-Around
Bronze medal – third place	2024 Tashkent	Hoop
Bronze medal – third place	2025 Singapore	All-Around
Bronze medal – third place	2026 Bishkek	Ribbon
Grand Prix Final
Silver medal – second place	2025 Brno	Clubs
Silver medal – second place	2025 Brno	Ribbon
Summer Universiade
Bronze medal – third place	2025 Rhine-Rhur	Ribbon
Islamic Solidarity Games
Bronze medal – third place	2021 Konya	Team

Aibota Ertaiqyzy (Note: Often transliterated as Aibota Yertaikyzy through a Russified Romanization of Айбота Ертайкызы.) (Kazakh: Айбота Ертайқызы; born 28 March 2004) is a Kazakh rhythmic gymnast. She is the 2026 Asian all-around silver and the 2025 bronze medalist.

== Career ==
=== Junior ===
Aibota competed at the 2018 Junior Asian Championships in Kuala Lumpur, Malaysia, and won a bronze medal in the ribbon final behind Ekaterina Fetisova and Lola Zakirova.

=== Senior ===
==== 2021 ====
Aibota debuted in the senior category in 2021 at World Cup in Minsk, ending 15th in the all-around. In August, she competed at the 2021 Islamic Solidarity Games in Konya, Turkey. She won a bronze medal alongside Elzhana Taniyeva in the team competition. Individually, she won gold with ball and bronze medals in the hoop and ribbon finals.

==== 2022 ====
In 2022, she competed at the World Cup in Athens, taking 14th in the all-around, with her best finish being 9th with ball. A week later, she competed at the next World Cup in Sofia, where she was 15th in the all-around. At the end of June, she participated in the 2022 Asian Rhythmic Gymnastics Championships in Pattaya, winning silver in the team category. In August, Aibota competed at the 2021 Islamic Solidarity Games in Konya, where she won bronze in teams. In September, she took part in the World Championships in Sofia along with her teammates Elzhana Taniyeva and the senior group. She finished in 24th place in the all-around, 18th with hoop, 29th with ball, 24th with clubs and 17th with ribbon.

==== 2023 ====
The following year, she debuted at the World Cup in Athens and placed 14th in the all-around. In April, at the World Cup in Tashkent, she took 10th place overall and finished 6th with ribbon in Tashkent. She won a bronze medal in the all-around at the World Challenge Cup Portimão behind Darja Varfolomeev and Evita Griskenas, and she then won two more medals in the apparatus finals, a bronze in hoop and a silver in ball.

==== 2024 ====
In 2024, Aibota started the season competing at the Tartu Grand Prix, where she took 4th place in the all-around. She won a silver medal in ball and a bronze in the hoop final. The next month, she was again 4th in the all-around at the Thiais Grand Prix. She won silver medals in the hoop and ribbon finals and a bronze medal in ball. Aibota was later selected for the Asian Championships in Tashkent, where she won gold in the ribbon final. She also won silver in teams (along with Elzhana Taniyeva and the senior group) and individually with ball, along with bronze in the hoop final.

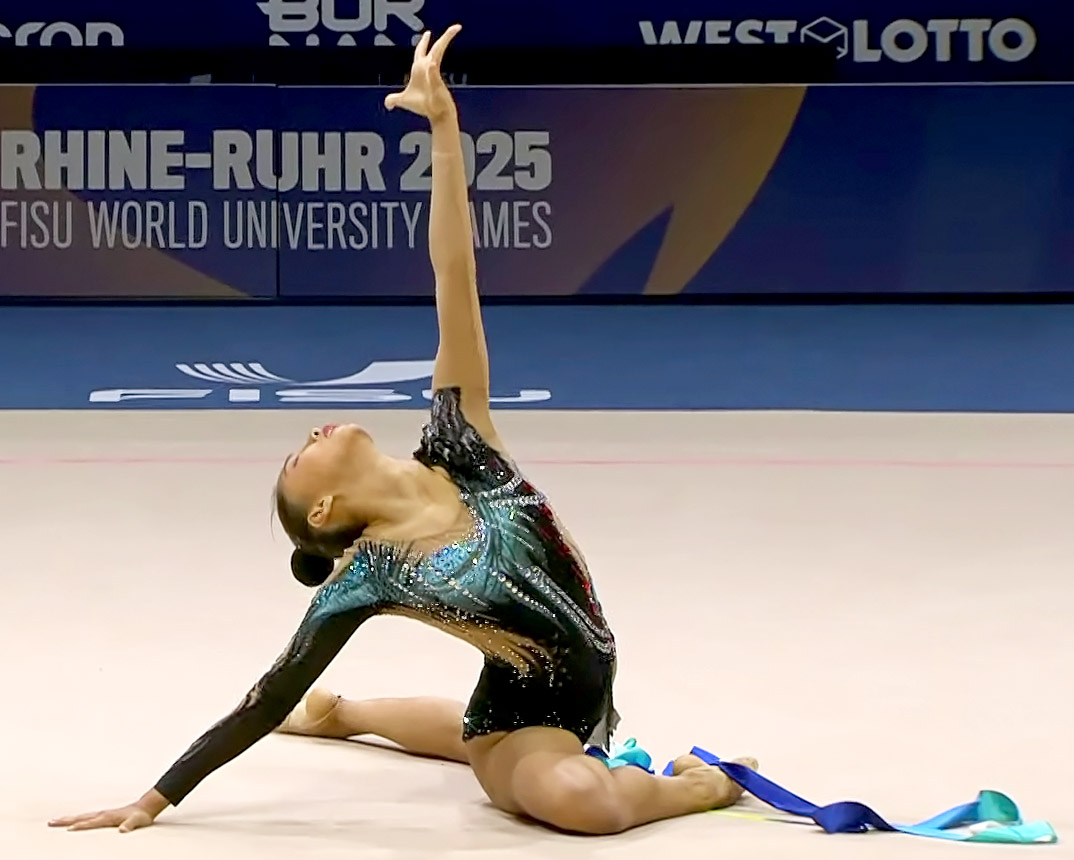
Aibota at the 2025 Summer World University Games

==== 2025 ====
In 2025, Aibota competed at the Grand Prix Thiais in late March, and took 7th place in the all-around. In April, she competed at the World Cup Tashkent and placed 5th in the all-around, 4th in hoop, 6th in clubs and 6th in ribbon. In May, she was selected to compete at the Asian Championships in Singapore, where she won the bronze medal in the all-around and gold in ribbon. She competed at the 2025 Summer Universiade in July, where she took 5th place in the all-around and won a bronze medal in the ribbon final. On July 25–27, she competed at the Cluj-Napoca World Challenge Cup and finished 9th in the all-around. She qualified to the ribbon final, finishing in 4th place.

Aibota was selected to represent Kazakhstan alongside Aiym Meirzhanova at the 2025 World Championships, in Rio de Janeiro, Brazil. They took 13th place in the team competition together with the senior group. She finished in 34th place in all-around qualifications due to mistakes in her ball routine (score 23.400).

In September, she took 5th place in the all-around at the Brno Grand Prix. In the finals, she won silver medals with clubs and ribbon.

==== 2026 ====
In February she won silver medal in the all-around the Kazakhstani National Championships. She also won gold medals in hoop and ribbon and silver in ball and clubs. In March, she competed at Marbella Grand Prix and took 11th place. She also qualified to two apparatus finals, finishing 8th with hoop and 7th with clubs. She competed at World Cup Sofia, where she finished on 14th place in all-around. In April, she took 36th place in all-around at World Cup Baku.

At the 2026 Asian Championships in Bishkek, she won silver in the all-around final. She qualified for all apparatus finals, finishing 6th with hoop, 8th with ball, 4th with clubs and 3rd with ribbon. Additionally, she finished second in the team ranking, together with teammate Akmaral Yerekesheva and the national team of Kazakhstan.

In July she participated to the Milan World Cup, placing 32nd in the all-around and with ribbon being her best apparatus. In August, she was selected to participate to the World Championships in Frankfurt am Main, where she finished 24th in the all-around, 10th with hoop, 33rd with ball, 15th with clubs and 32nd with ribbon.

== Routine music information ==
Year	Apparatus	Music title
2026	Hoop	Playing with Fire by Jake Warren & Dana Kelson
2026	Ball (first)	Mon amour by Slimane
2026	Ball (second)	Feeling Good by J Ram
2026	Ball (third)	Sweet Dreams (Are Made of This) by Kat Leon
2026	Clubs	GOSSIP by Måneskin, Tom Morello
2026	Ribbon	Gloria Regali by Tommee Profitt feat. Fleurie
2025	Hoop	
2025	Ball	Mon amour by Slimane
2025	Clubs	Gossip by Måneskin
2025	Ribbon	Gloria Regali by Tommee Profitt feat. Fleurie
2024	Hoop	Ready or Not by Mischa "Book" Chillak feat. Esthero
2024	Ball	Любовь уставших лебедей by Димаш Кудайберген
2024	Clubs	Crazy in love by Beyoncé
2024	Ribbon	Skyfall by Adele
