= Li Huilin (gymnast) =

Chinese rhythmic gymnast

- 栗慧琳
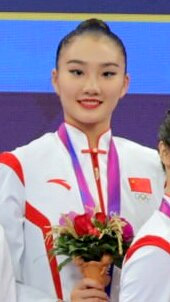

Personal information
- Born: 10 January 2003 (age 23) Hebei

Gymnastics career
- Discipline: Rhythmic gymnastics
- Country represented: China; (2019-)
- Club: Hebei Province
- Head coaches: Liu Yajuan, Yan Yunwen
Medal record
Representing China
Rhythmic Gymnastics
Asian Games
Bronze medal – third place	2022 Hangzhou	Team

Li Huilin (Chinese: 栗慧琳; born 10 January 2003) is a Chinese rhythmic gymnast. She represents China in international competitions.

== Biography ==
Li became a senior in 2019, when she was named an Elite Athlete of National Class by the General Administration of Sport of China. That same year a foot fracture prevented her from competing. In 2022 she was selected for the World Championships in Sofia, where she performed with clubs, finishing 31st in the clubs apparatus and 12th in the team event.

In April 2023 she competed at the World Cup in Tashkent, finishing 24th in the All-Around, 21st with hoop, 33rd with ball, 20th with clubs and 23rd with ribbon. In July she took part in the 2021 Universiade in Chengdu, being 7th in the All-Around, and 4th in both the hoop and ball finals. In October she won bronze in team, along Wang Zilu, Zhao Yating and Zhao Yue, at the 2022 Asian Games in Hangzhou. In November she took silver with ribbon and gold with clubs at nationals.

In 2024 she won bronze at the Chinese Championships. On May 18, she took third place at the Olympic Trials.
