= Mikayla Angeline Yang =

Singaporean rhythmic gymnast

Mikayla Angeline Yang 杨慧婷
- Born: 6 September 2007 (age 19) Singapore
- Height: 157 cm (5 ft 2 in)

Gymnastics career
- Discipline: Rhythmic gymnastics
- Country represented: Singapore; (2020–present)
- Club: National Training Centre
- Former coaches: Tatiana Kartseva, Nastia Kartseva, Irina Bessmertnaya
Medal record
Representing Singapore
Women's Rhythmic gymnastics
SEA Games
Silver medal – second place	2025 Thailand	All-around

Mikayla Angeline Yang (born 6 September 2007) is a Singaporean individual rhythmic gymnast.

== Career ==
Yang took up rhythmic gymnastics at age 6 after her mother saw her friend's daughter doing it. Her mother took her to a nearby gym, and once Yang started the sport, she found she enjoyed it.

Yang moved to the United States when she was 12 for better training opportunities. Currently, she divides her time between the US and Singapore, spending nine months of the year training in Chicago, while returning to Singapore periodically to visit friends and family. To accommodate her training schedule, she attends school online. Yang has often cited Son Yeon-jae as her favourite gymnast and source of inspiration.

=== Junior ===
Yang started competing internationally with her club, the National Training Centre, in 2019. Internationally, she obtained 2nd place in the Pre Junior Category of the 2019 Happy Cup in Ghent, Belgium, as well as 1st place in the Level 10 Hope Individual category at the 2019 Coaches Cup in Syracuse, New York. She also placed 1st in the 2019 Singapore Open Gymnastics Championship in the Age 12 Category. These achievements resulted in the Singapore Gymnastics Organisation conferring her the National Athlete of the Year Award for High Performance (Rhythmic Gymnastics) in 2020.

Yang became a member of the junior national team in 2020, while continuing to train in the US at the Texas Connections Academy of Houston. She was the winner of the junior category at the Singapore Gymnastics National Championships in 2021 and 2022. She also won the Singapore Gymnastics Organisation's International Junior Athlete of the Year - Rhythmic Gymnastics Award in 2022.

She represented Singapore in the 18th Junior Asian Championships held in Pattaya, Thailand in 2022. She qualified for the ball final and finished in 5th place with a score of 26.30.

=== Senior ===
Yang became age-eligible for senior competitions in 2023. In March that year, she captured the top spot in the Singapore Gymnastics National Championships with a score of 110.600, qualifying for a spot on the national senior team.

She made her international debut at the World Challenge Cup Portimao, where she took 17th place in the all-around. She placed 10th in both ball and ribbon qualifications, almost qualifying for the apparatus finals. In early June, she represented Singapore at the 2023 Asian Championships in Manila, Philippines and took 10th place in the all-around. At the end of August, she competed at the 2023 World Championships in Valencia, Spain, and ended in 46th place in the all-around qualifications. In October, she competed at the delayed 2022 Asian Games in Hangzhou, China, finishing in 13th place in the all-around final.

Yang won the 2024 Singapore Gymnastics National Championships. At the 2024 Asian Championships in Tashkent, Uzbekistan, she took 9th place in the all-around. She qualified for the ball final, where she finished 8th. In June, she competed at the Milan World Cup and finished in 33rd place in the all-around.

The next year, she again won the national championships, scoring 108.450. Her first international competition of 2025 was the International Tournament Sofia Cup, held 28–30 March, where she took 11th place in the all-around and won a bronze medal in the ball final. In April, Yang competed at the Sofia World Cup, finishing 33rd in the all-around. Next, she competed at Tashkent World Cup, placing 21st in the all-around. In May, she represented Singapore at the 2025 Asian Championships, held in her home country of Singapore, finishing 6th in the all-around after a small mistake during her clubs routine. With a score of 76.500 points total, she was the top-ranked gymnast from Southeast Asia. On 18–20 July, she competed at the Milan World Cup, where she took 31st place in the all-around out of 74 gymnasts. In late August, she was selected to represent Singapore as their only individual gymnast at the 2025 World Championships in Rio de Janeiro, Brazil. She came in 36th in all-around qualifications out of 97 gymnasts.

In December, Yang represented Singapore at the 33rd SEA Games held at Thammasat University in Thailand. In the preliminary round, she obtained a score of 98.820 and placed 2nd out of 9 gymnasts, advancing to the finals. She went on to win the silver medal in the finals with a score of 101.49. While Yang expressed disappointment in her ribbon routine, her performance was Singapore's first individual rhythmic gymnastics medal at the Games since one won in 2017 by Tong Kah Mun, and hers was Singapore's best-ever individual all-around result at the SEA Games.

In May 2026, she competed at the 2026 Asian Championships in Bishkek, and placed 12th in the all-around final.

== Routine music information ==
Year	Apparatus	Music title
2025	Hoop	Sugar Like That by Gin Wigmore
2025	Ball	Masciare Witch Mix by Faraualla
2025	Clubs	
2025	Ribbon	Land of 1000 Dances by Wilson Pickett
2024	Hoop	
2024	Ball	I'm Gonna Live Till I Die (Remastered 2001) by Frank Sinatra
2024	Clubs	
2024	Ribbon	
2023	Hoop	Who You Really Are (From Sherlock) by Michael Price, David Arnold
2023	Ball	I'm Gonna Live Till I Die (Remastered 2001) by Frank Sinatra
2023	Clubs	Great Balls Of Fire (From Great Balls Of Fire!) by Jerry Lee Lewis
2023	Ribbon	The Tsar's Bride: Overture by Orchestra of the Bolshoi Theatre & Fouat Mansourov
