= Ekaterina Yan =

South Korean rhythmic gymnast

- Екатерина Ян
- Born: 19 May 2007 (age 19) Uzbekistan

Gymnastics career
- Discipline: Rhythmic gymnastics
- Country represented: South Korea; (2022-present)
Medal record
Rhythmic gymnastics
Representing South Korea
Asian Championships
Silver medal – second place	2025 Singapore	All-Around
Bronze medal – third place	2025 Singapore	5 Ribbons
Bronze medal – third place	2025 Singapore	3 Balls & 2 Hoops
Bronze medal – third place	2026 Bishkek	5 Balls

Ekaterina Yan (Russian: Екатерина Ян; born 19 May 2007) is an Uzbek born South Korean rhythmic gymnast. She represents South Korea in international competitions as part of the senior group.

== Personal life ==
Yan's parents are of Koryo-saram descent. She took up rhythmic gymnastics in her native Tashkent at age three. In 2012, when she was five, her family relocated to South Korea. After graduating from high school she enrolled in the Korean Sports University.

== Career ==
In December 2022 Yan passed the national selection (국가대표선발전) and got into the Korean national team, being included into the senior group's rooster.

She became a starter in 2025, being selected for the Asian Championships in Singapore along Habyn Cho, Jiwoo Kim, Minseul Kim, Jungeun Lee and Suyeon Park. There the group won silver in the All-Around and bronze in the two event finals. In August she competed in the 2025 World Championships in Rio de Janeiro, being 20th in the All-Around, 22nd with 5 ribbons and 16th with 3 balls & hoops.

The following year she again participated in the Asian Championships in Bishkek, being 5th in teams, 4th overall and winning bronze in the 5 balls final.
