= Reina Matsusaka =

Japanese rhythmic gymnast

- 松坂 玲奈
- Born: 23 October 2000 (age 25) Kanagawa, Japan

Gymnastics career
- Discipline: Rhythmic gymnastics
- Country represented: Japan (2023-)
Medal record
Rhythmic Gymnastics
Representing Japan
Summer Universiade
Bronze medal – third place	2021 Chengdu	All-around
Bronze medal – third place	2021 Chengdu	Clubs
Asian Championships
Silver medal – second place	2024 Tashkent	Hoop
Silver medal – second place	2025 Singapore	Ball
Silver medal – second place	2025 Singapore	Clubs
Bronze medal – third place	2024 Tashkent	Team
Bronze medal – third place	2024 Tashkent	All-Around
Bronze medal – third place	2024 Tashkent	Clubs
Bronze medal – third place	2024 Tashkent	Ribbon
Bronze medal – third place	2025 Singapore	Team
Bronze medal – third place	2025 Singapore	Ribbon

Reina Matsusaka (born 23 October 2000) is a Japanese rhythmic gymnast. She is the 2024 all-around Asian bronze medalist.

== Personal life ==
Matsusaka began rhythmic gymnastics at age 3 because her mother was a coach at a gymnastics club, and she began to be coached by her mother in middle school. In 2019, she enrolled at Tokyo Women's Junior College of Physical Education.

== Career ==
At the All-Japan Intercollegiate Gymnastics Championships in August 2019, Matsusaka won bronze with the hoop and was 5th individually. At the All-Japan Rhythmic Gymnastics Championships in October, she won silver with ball.

Matsusaka debuted internationally several years later in 2023, when she competed in the Sofia International Tournament. She won bronze with ball and clubs and silver with hoop. In the summer, she took part in the 2021 Summer World University Games in Chengdu and won bronze in the all-around behind Fanni Pigniczki and Khrystyna Pohranychna. She also won a bronze medal with clubs. In October she was selected for the Asian Games. There she finished 4th in teams with the other Japanese gymnasts and 7th in the all-around final.

The following year, she began her season by competing in Athens at the Aphrodite Cup. She was 6th in the all-around and won bronze with hoop and ribbon. In April she competed in the World Cup in Baku, taking 15th place in the all-around, 17th with hoop, 13th with ball, 9th with clubs and 21st with ribbon.

On May 3, she won the all-around bronze medal at the Asian Championships in Tashkent behind Elzhana Taniyeva and Takhmina Ikromova. There was one Olympic berth available at the event, which went to Taniyeva. Although Matsusaka did not qualify for the 2024 Summer Olympics, she said of the event, "Previously, I was not in a position where I could aim for the Olympics, so this has been a very fruitful year. I'm happy I was able to make the Olympics my goal." She also won silver medal in hoop and bronze medals in clubs and ribbon finals.

In 2025, she competed at Tashkent World Cup in April. She was 22nd in all-around and did not advance into apparatus finals. Her best result was with ribbon (12th place). In May, she took 4th place in all-around at the 2025 Asian Championships in Singapore. She won silver in ball and clubs finals, bronze in ribbon and was 7th in hoop. In July, she competed at the Milan World Cup, where she took 19th place in the all-around. Her best result was hoop (10th place). In August, she competed at her first World Championships, in Rio de Janeiro, Brazil, where she took 21st place in all-around qualifications and did not advance into the all-around final.

== Routine music information ==
Year	Apparatus	Music Title
2025	Hoop	Hakuryu&Kokuryu - II by Drum Tao
2025	Ball	Main Titles / End Credits (From Beetlejuice Soundtrack) by Danny Elfman
2025	Clubs	Tokyo Calling by Atarashii Gakko!
2025	Ribbon	L'Arabesque Dance Toujours by Shiro Sagisu
2024	Hoop	El Cumbanchero by Tokyo Kosei Wind Orchestra
2024	Ball	Kaneda (From Akira Symphonic Suite) by Geinoh Yamashirogumi / Aomori Nebuta Festival (Dance Mix) by Blue Tokyo
2024	Clubs	unknown
2024	Ribbon	Theme from Lupin III '89 / Missing Piece / Theme from Lupin III 2021 by Yuji Ohno
