= Zhao Yue (gymnast) =

Chinese rhythmic gymnast

- Nickname: Eva
- Born: 6 April 2004 (age 22) Nanchong, Sichuan, China

Gymnastics career
- Discipline: Rhythmic gymnastics
- Country represented: China; (2019-)
- Club: Sichuan Province
- Head coaches: Kang Qi, Yan Yunwen
Medal record
Representing China
Rhythmic Gymnastics
Asian Games
Bronze medal – third place	2022 Hangzhou	Team
Asian Championships
Bronze medal – third place	2023 Manila	Team

Zhao Yue (Chinese: 赵樾, born 6 April 2004) is a Chinese rhythmic gymnast. She won team bronze at the Asian Championships in 2023.

== Personal life ==
She took up the sport at age 7 after being scouted by coach Hu Lingli. She's studying at the Beijing Sport University.

== Career ==
In 2019 she was selected for the junior World Championships in Moscow, being 13th with rope, 28th with ball, 20th with clubs and 13th with ribbon.

Two years later competed at the senior edition, ending 19th in the All-Around, 14th with hoop, 23rd with ball, 25th with clubs and 22nd with ribbon.

In 2022 she was 5th with ball at the Asian Championships. At the World Championships she took 40th place in the All-Around, 32nd with hoop, 15th with the ball and 54th with ribbon.

At the 2023 Asian Championships she won bronze in the team event. She is set to compete at the Asian Games.
