= Viktoriya Nikiforova =

Uzbek rhythmic gymnast (born 2010)

- Born: 2 January 2010 (age 16) Tashkent, Uzbekistan

Gymnastics career
- Discipline: Rhythmic gymnastics
- Country represented: Uzbekistan; (2024-present)
- Head coach: Maria Mamadjanova
Medal record
Representing Uzbekistan
Rhythmic gymnastics
Junior World Championships
Bronze medal – third place	2025 Sofia	Team
Asian Junior Championships
Gold medal – first place	2024 Tashkent	Hoop
Gold medal – first place	2025 Singapore	Team
Silver medal – second place	2025 Singapore	Hoop
Bronze medal – third place	2025 Singapore	Clubs

Viktoriya Nikiforova (born 2 January 2010) is an Uzbek rhythmic gymnast. She represents Uzbekistan in international competitions.

== Biography ==
In April 2024 Nikiforova won gold in teams and with hoop at the Bosphorus Cup in Istanbul. In May she was selected to compete with hoop at the 2024 Asian Championships, winning gold.

In early March 2025 she won bronze in teams, silver with hoop and clubs at the Sofia International Cup. Days later she claimed gold overall, with hoop and with ribbon at nationals among juniors. In early May she took gold with hoop at the Shining star tournament. Later she competed with hoop and clubs in the Asian Championships in Singapore, winning gold in teams, silver with hoop and bronze with clubs. In late June Nikiforova was selected for the 3rd Junior World Championships in Sofia, competing with hoop and clubs she finished in 17th place with clubs and instead qualified for the hoop event final, later she won bronze in teams along Sofiya Usova and the national group.
