= Sofiya Usova =

Uzbekistani rhythmic gymnast

- Born: 12 July 2010 (age 16) Tashkent, Uzbekistan

Gymnastics career
- Discipline: Rhythmic gymnastics
- Country represented: Uzbekistan; (2023-present)
Medal record
Representing Uzbekistan
Rhythmic gymnastics
Event	1st	2nd	3rd
FIG World Cup	0	0	1
Total	0	0	1
Junior World Championships
Bronze medal – third place	2025 Sofia	Team
Asian Junior Championships
Gold medal – first place	2025 Singapore	Team
Silver medal – second place	2024 Tashkent	Clubs
Silver medal – second place	2025 Singapore	Ball
Silver medal – second place	2025 Singapore	Ribbon

Sofiya Usova (born 12 July 2010) is an Uzbek rhythmic gymnast. She represents Uzbekistan in international competitions.

== Personal life ==
Her older sister Nataliya is also a successful rhythmic gymnast.

== Biography ==
=== Junior ===
In November 2023 Usova won the All Around at the Bright Star tournament in Tashkent. In April of the following year she won gold in teams and silver with clubs at the Bosphorus Cup in Istanbul. In May she was selected to compete with clubs at the 2024 Asian Championships, she won silver behind Park Seohyun. In November of the same year she was 5th with hoop, 4th with clubs, and won silver with ball and ribbon at the Sky Grace Cup.

In early March 2025 she won bronze in teams and gold with ribbon at the Sofia International Cup. Days later she claimed silver overall and gold with clubs at nationals among juniors. In early May she took gold with ball and ribbon at the Shining star tournament. Later she competed with ball and ribbon in the Asian Championships in Singapore, winning gold in teams and silver in the two apparatus finals. In late June Usova was selected for the 3rd Junior World Championships in Sofia, competing with ball and ribbon she finished in 12th place with ball and intead qualified for the ribbon event final.

=== Senior ===
Usova became age eligible for senior competitions in 2026, being included into the Uzbek national group. Debuting at the World Cupin Baku where she won bronze in the 5 balls final.
