= Gymnastics at the 2022 Asian Games – Women's rhythmic individual all-around =

Women's individual all-around at the 2022 Asian Games
- Venue: Huanglong Gymnasium
- Date: 6–7 October 2023
- Competitors: 31 from 14 nations

Medalists
gold medal	Takhmina Ikromova	Uzbekistan
silver medal	Elzhana Taniyeva	Kazakhstan
bronze medal	Milana Parfilova	Kazakhstan

The women's rhythmic individual all-around competition at the 2022 Asian Games took place from 6 to 7 October 2023 at Huanglong Sports Centre Gymnasium in Hangzhou, China.

== Schedule ==
All times are China Standard Time (UTC+08:00)

Date	Time	Event
Friday, 6 October 2023	10:00	Qualification
Saturday, 7 October 2023	14:30	Final

== Results ==
=== Qualification ===
Rank	Athlete	Hoop (rhythmic gymnastics)	Ball (rhythmic gymnastics)	Clubs (rhythmic gymnastics)	Ribbon (rhythmic gymnastics)	Total
1	Takhmina Ikromova (UZB)	33.850	33.300	33.100	~~31.250~~	100.250
2	Evelina Atalyants (UZB)	34.850	33.400	31.950	~~31.250~~	100.200
3	Elzhana Taniyeva (KAZ)	32.750	33.000	~~31.900~~	31.900	97.650
4	Wang Zilu (CHN)	32.500	32.300	32.550	~~28.800~~	97.350
5	Zhao Yating (CHN)	31.900	33.000	~~30.400~~	31.100	96.000
6	Milana Parfilova (KAZ)	32.200	30.950	31.450	~~30.600~~	94.600
7	Reina Matsusaka (JPN)	31.500	32.000	~~25.100~~	30.300	93.800
8	Erika Zhailauova (KAZ)	30.950	31.400	~~27.550~~	30.450	92.800
9	Vilana Savadyan (UZB)	~~27.300~~	31.200	30.650	30.350	92.200
10	Yume Kaiho (JPN)	30.100	~~27.850~~	28.150	29.000	87.250
11	Sohn Ji-in (KOR)	28.700	29.600	28.450	~~27.350~~	86.750
12	Breanna Labadan (PHI)	30.150	~~25.500~~	28.200	27.950	86.300
13	Ha Su-lee (KOR)	28.800	~~27.550~~	28.800	28.250	85.850
14	Ng Joe Ee (MAS)	~~28.050~~	28.900	28.200	28.050	85.150
15	Mei Tsuruta (JPN)	29.450	~~23.500~~	28.750	25.900	84.100
16	Elizaveta Golinko (KGZ)	27.950	27.350	27.950	~~25.850~~	83.250
17	Mikayla Yang (SGP)	26.250	28.600	26.200	~~25.750~~	81.050
18	Tinatin Satykeeva (KGZ)	25.600	25.350	27.350	~~22.650~~	78.300
19	Albina Kozubaeva (KGZ)		25.850	26.500	25.300	77.650
20	Puntita Thongsong (THA)	25.600	25.350	24.800	~~23.450~~	75.750
21	Katelin Heng (SGP)	24.150	24.450	24.050		72.650
22	Pebbyl Ang (SGP)		26.600	23.550	22.200	72.350
23	Piyada Peeramatukorn (THA)	25.400	24.200	~~22.650~~	22.750	72.350
24	Praewa Misato Philaphandeth (LAO)	~~22.850~~	24.250	24.400	22.950	71.600
25	Erdenebayaryn Lkhagvatsetseg (MGL)	25.300	26.400		19.000	70.700
26	Nagham El-Shorafa (PLE)	20.450	23.900	23.300	~~19.150~~	67.650
27	Mareya Waeuseng (THA)	21.100	~~20.050~~	21.150	21.050	63.300
28	Narangereliin Anujin (MGL)		22.500	20.850	18.750	62.100
29	Ganzorigiin Günchinmaa (MGL)	21.45	19.700	20.050		61.200
30	Zolbayaryn Ankhtamir (MGL)	19.950		16.350	20.550	56.850
31	Maha Al-Saqer (KUW)	17.750	17.650	17.200	~~16.450~~	52.600

=== Final ===
Rank	Athlete	Hoop (rhythmic gymnastics)	Ball (rhythmic gymnastics)	Clubs (rhythmic gymnastics)	Ribbon (rhythmic gymnastics)	Total
1st place, gold medalist(s)	Takhmina Ikromova (UZB)	32.000	33.250	34.100	31.950	131.300
2nd place, silver medalist(s)	Elzhana Taniyeva (KAZ)	31.850	32.700	32.800	33.350	130.700
3rd place, bronze medalist(s)	Milana Parfilova (KAZ)	33.650	32.450	32.100	31.850	130.050
4	Evelina Atalyants (UZB)	33.600	32.350	30.750	32.050	128.750
5	Wang Zilu (CHN)	33.000	33.400	30.850	31.350	128.600
6	Zhao Yating (CHN)	32.100	32.750	32.250	30.800	127.900
7	Reina Matsusaka (JPN)	32.950	30.000	32.400	30.050	125.400
8	Sohn Ji-in (KOR)	31.400	30.900	29.550	27.800	119.650
9	Yume Kaiho (JPN)	30.400	28.800	29.450	28.400	117.050
10	Ha Su-lee (KOR)	28.350	31.350	26.900	30.150	116.750
11	Ng Joe Ee (MAS)	28.800	31.550	27.700	28.200	116.250
12	Breanna Labadan (PHI)	29.950	26.250	28.500	26.550	111.250
13	Mikayla Yang (SGP)	28.050	27.900	26.750	28.100	110.800
14	Elizaveta Golinko (KGZ)	25.450	26.200	26.800	27.150	105.600
15	Piyada Peeramatukorn (THA)	24.600	27.600	26.300	21.500	100.000
16	Puntita Thongsong (THA)	25.400	24.900	24.650	23.750	98.700
17	Tinatin Satykeeva (KGZ)	24.350	23.900	26.950	21.400	96.600
18	Katelin Heng (SGP)	22.900	23.200	24.350	23.350	93.800
19	Erdenebayaryn Lkhagvatsetseg (MGL)	20.150	24.100	23.000	23.250	90.500
20	Praewa Misato Philaphandeth (LAO)	22.350	21.000	23.500	23.200	90.050
21	Narangereliin Anujin (MGL)	22.400	22.750	19.950	20.900	86.000
22	Nagham El-Shorafa (PLE)	18.750	21.650	20.650	17.500	78.550
23	Maha Al-Saqer (KUW)	16.250	14.900	15.250	15.550	61.950
