= Natsumi Hanamura =

Japanese Rhythmic Gymnast

- 花村 夏実
- Born: 12 July 2008 (age 18) Nagano, Japan
- Height: 169 cm (5 ft 7 in)

Gymnastics career
- Discipline: Rhythmic Gymnastics
- Country represented: Japan; (2023–present)
- Club: Wing Matsumoto RG
- Head coaches: Rika Yamamoto, Yukari Murata
Medal record
Group rhythmic gymnastics
Representing Japan
Event	1st	2nd	3rd
World Championships	1	2	0
World Cup	1	4	2
Total	2	6	2
World Championships
Gold medal – first place	2025 Rio de Janeiro	Group All-Around
Silver medal – second place	2025 Rio de Janeiro	5 Ribbons
Silver medal – second place	2026 Frankfurt	Group All-Around
Asian Games
Silver medal – second place	2026 Aichi-Nagoya	Group All-around
Junior Asian Championships
Bronze medal – third place	2023 Manila	Group All-around
Bronze medal – third place	2023 Manila	Team
Bronze medal – third place	2023 Manila	5 Ropes
Bronze medal – third place	2023 Manila	5 Balls

Natsumi Hanamura (Japanese: 花村 夏実, born 12 July 2008) is a Japanese rhythmic gymnast. She represents Japan internationally as a member of the national group. She is the 2025 World group all-around champion and the 2026 World group all-around silver medalist.

== Early life ==
Hanamura was born in Nagano on 12 July 2008. She took up gymnastics at age three in Matsumoto, Nagano. She is currently a second year high school student at Matsumoto International High School.

== Gymnastics career ==
=== Junior ===
In 2023, Hanamura was part of the Japanese junior team along with Yuna Tanaka, Julia Nishi, Rio Matsuda and Anon Mashima. From 31 May to 3 June the group took part in 2023 Asian Junior Championships in Manila, Philippines. They won bronze medals in group all-around, team competition, 5 ropes and 5 balls. Later that year, they competed at the 2023 Junior World Championships in Cluj-Napoca, Romania, and took 12th place in team all-around.

=== Senior ===
==== 2025 ====
In 2025, Hanamura joined the main senior team and won a silver medal in all-around at the Sofia World Cup. The team also won a silver medal in the 5 ribbons and a bronze in the 3 balls + 2 hoops finals. In the Baku leg of the competition, Hanamura helped Japan win a gold medal in the 3 balls + 2 hoops event. In July, they won a bronze medal in 5 the ribbons and silver medals in the all-around and 3 balls + 2 hoops at Milan World Cup. The week after, they competed at Cluj-Napoca World Challenge Cup, where they took 4th place in all-around and 7th place in 5 ribbons final.

In late August, Hanamura was selected to represent Japan alongside Megumi Nishimoto, Hatsune Miyoshi, Ayuka Suzuki, Rinako Inaki and Hisano Taguchi at the 2025 World Championships in Rio de Janeiro, Brazil. Hanamura received the highest score in the hoop + ball section of the all-around competition, helping the team win the gold medal in the team all-around, beating Brazil by 0.3 of a point. They were the first Japanese and first Asian the first all-around team World champions from Asia. They also won silver medal in 5 ribbons final and took 5th place in 3 balls + 2 hoops final.

==== 2026 ====
In 2026, Hanamura remained in the group after teammates Ayuka Suzuki and Rinako Inaki retiring. She and her group took 6th place in all-around and 5th in 3 hoops + 4 clubs final at the Sofia World Cup. They took another 6th place in all-around at the Tashkent World Cup and 4th place in 5 balls final. They were 9th in all-around at Baku World Cup. In June, they took 6th place in all-around at Beijing World Challenge Cup. In July, they ended on 5th place in all-around and 8th place in 3 hoops + 4 clubs final at Milan World Cup.

In August, she was selected to represent Japan alongside Rin Manabe, Megumi Nishimoto, Hisano Taguchi, Kaseno Tanabe and Yuna Tanaka at the 2026 World Championships in Frankfurt, Germany. They won silver medal in group all-around event, which earned them a quota for the 2028 Olympic Games. In apparatus finals, they took 4th place in 3 hoops + 4 clubs and 7th place in 5 balls.
