= Rina Imaoka =

Japanese rhythmic gymnast

- 今岡里奈
- Born: 22 March 2003 (age 23) Saitama Prefecture

Gymnastics career
- Discipline: Rhythmic gymnastics
- Country represented: Japan; (2021-present)
- Club: Tokyo Women's College of Physical Education / Fujishima Rhythmic Gymnastics Club
- Head coaches: Keiko Onoda, Yukari Murata
Medal record
Group rhythmic gymnastics
Representing Japan
World Championships
Bronze medal – third place	2021 Kitakyushu	5 Balls
Bronze medal – third place	2021 Kitakyushu	3 Hoops + 4 Clubs
Asian Championships
Silver medal – second place	2022 Pattaya	Group All-around
Silver medal – second place	2022 Pattaya	3 Ribbons + 2 Balls
Bronze medal – third place	2022 Pattaya	Team
Bronze medal – third place	2022 Pattaya	5 Hoops

Rina Imaoka (今岡里奈, Imaoka Rina; born 22 March 2003) is a Japanese group rhythmic gymnast. She represents Japan internationally as a member of the national group.

== Biography ==
Imaoka took up the sport at age six after seeing a friend play with a ribbon. Her idol is Evgenia Kanaeva.

In 2021 she was selected for the World Championships in Kitakyushu along with Rinako Inaki, Rie Matsubara, Sayuri Sugimoto, Ayuka Suzuki. There, the group won bronze in both event finals.

In June 2022 she competed at the World Cup in Pesaro, where the gorup was 5th in the all-around, 9th with 5 hoops and 7th with 3 ribbons & 2 balls. At the Asian Championships in Pattaya, she won two silver medals, in the all-around and with 3 ribbon & 2 balls, and two bronze medals, in teams and with 5 hoops.

A foot injury meant she was unable to participate in the hoop event at the 2023 Asian Championships in Manila. In August she was selected, along with teammates Rinako Inaki, Chihana Nakamura, Megumi Nishimoto, Ayuka Suzuki and Hisano Taguchi, for the World Championships in Valencia. They were 13th in the all-around and with 5 hoops and 6th with 3 ribbons & 2 balls.
