= Rinako Inaki =

Japanese rhythmic gymnast

- 稲木李菜子
- Nicknames: Rinko, Inaki-chan
- Born: 22 April 2003 (age 23) Kumamoto

Gymnastics career
- Discipline: Rhythmic gymnastics
- Country represented: Japan; (2021-2025)
- Club: Kokushikan University / Midori Rhythmic Gymnastics Club
- Head coaches: Rika Yamamoto, Yukari Murata
- Retired: yes
Medal record
Group rhythmic gymnastics
Representing Japan
Event	1st	2nd	3rd
World Championships	1	1	2
FIG World Cup	2	2	2
Total	3	3	4
World Championships
Gold medal – first place	2025 Rio de Janeiro	Group All-Around
Silver medal – second place	2025 Rio de Janeiro	5 Ribbons
Bronze medal – third place	2021 Kitakyushu	5 Balls
Bronze medal – third place	2021 Kitakyushu	3 Hoops + 4 Clubs
Asian Championships
Gold medal – first place	2024 Tashkent	5 Hoops
Silver medal – second place	2022 Pattaya	Group All-around
Silver medal – second place	2022 Pattaya	3 Ribbons + 2 Balls
Silver medal – second place	2023 Manila	5 Hoops
Silver medal – second place	2024 Tashkent	Group All-Around
Silver medal – second place	2024 Tashkent	3 Ribbons + 2 Balls
Bronze medal – third place	2022 Pattaya	Team
Bronze medal – third place	2022 Pattaya	5 Hoops
Bronze medal – third place	2023 Manila	All-around

Rinako Inaki (Japanese: 稲木李菜子, Hepburn: Inaki Rinako; born 22 April 2003) is a former Japanese rhythmic gymnast. She represented Japan internationally as a member of the national group.

== Biography ==
Inaki took up the sport at age six in 2009 in Kumamoto having been influenced by her sister. In 2021 she was selected for the World Championships in Kitakyushu along Rina Imaoka, Rie Matsubara, Sayuri Sugimoto, Ayuka Suzuki. There the group won bronze with 5 balls and with 3 hoops & 4 clubs.

In April 2022 she competed at the World Cup in Sofia, being 4th in the All-Around, and won silver with 5 hoops as well as bronze with 3 ribbons & 2 balls. Later in the month, in Baku, the group was 5th overall, 4th with 5 hoops and won silver in the mixed event. In the stage in Pesaro she was 5th in the All-Around, 9th with 5 hoops and 7th with 3 ribbons & 2 balls. At the Asian Championships in Pattaya she won bronze in teams and with 5 hoops, silver in the All-Around and with 3 ribbon & 2 balls. Then in Cluj-Napoca, the last World Cup of the season, the group was 17th overall. At the World Championships in Sofia Inaki, Mirika Hayashi, Fuka Ikuno, Chihana Nakamura, Ayuka Suzuki and Nanami Takenaka, took 8th place in the All-Around and the 5th with 5 hoops.

In 2023 the Japanese group debuted at the World Cup in Athens, being 9th in the All-Around and did not qualify for finals. In Sofia she was 8th overall, 4th with 5 hoops, and 10th with 3 ribbons & 2 balls. In Baku they finished 9th in the All-Around, 12th with 5 hoops and 8th in the mixed event. In Portimão the group was 6th in the All-Around and with 5 hoops, and won bronze with 3 ribbons & 2 balls. Competing at the Asian Championships she won bronze in the All-Around and silver with 5 hoops. In the World Cup in Cluj-Napoca Japan was 14th overall, 16th with 5 hoops and 12th with 3 ribbons & 2 balls. In August she was selected, along Rina Imaoka, Chihana Nakamura, Megumi Nishimoto, Ayuka Suzuki and Hisano Taguchi, for the World Championships in Valencia, being 13th in the All-Around and with 5 hoops, 6th with 3 ribbons & 2 balls.

In 2024 the Japanese group was 11th overall at the World Cup in Sofia. In April they took 5th place in the All-Around and two golds in the event finals at the stage in Baku. A month later Inaki, Fuka Ikuno, Megumi Nishimoto, Ayuka Suzuki, Hisano Taguchi and Nanami Takenaka participated in the Asian Championships, winning silver in the All-Around and with 3 ribbons & 2 balls as well as gold with 5 hoops, thus missing the qualification quota for Paris 2024.

In 2025, she competed as a part of a renewed group and won silver medal in all-around at Sofia World Cup. They also won silver medal in 5 ribbons and bronze in 3 balls + 2 hoops finals. In July, they bronze in 5 ribbons and silver medals in all-around and 3 balls + 2 hoops at Milan World Cup. Next week, they competed at Cluj-Napoca World Challenge Cup, where they took 4th place in all-around and 7th place in 5 ribbons final. In late August, she was selected to represent Japan alongside Natsumi Hanamura, Hatsune Miyoshi, Megumi Nishimoto, Ayuka Suzuki and Hisano Taguchi at the 2025 World Championships in Rio de Janeiro, Brazil. They won gold medal in group all-around, 0.3 point in front of Brazil, being the first World all-around champions from Asia. They also won silver medal in 5 ribbons final and took 5th place in 3 balls + 2 hoops final.

In October, Inaki, along with her teammate Ayuka Suzuki, announced her retirement.
