= Ayuka Suzuki =

Japanese rhythmic gymnast

- Nicknames: Ayu, Ayuka
- Born: 27 September 1999 (age 26) Anpachi, Gifu, Japan
- Height: 163 cm (5 ft 4 in)

Gymnastics career
- Discipline: Rhythmic gymnastics
- Country represented: Japan (2017–2025)
- Club: Okagi Kyoritsu Bank Gymnastics Club
- Head coach: Yukari Murata
- Retired: yes
Medal record
Group rhythmic gymnastics
Representing Japan
Event	1st	2nd	3rd
World Championships	2	5	3
World Cup	5	13	9
World Challenge Cup	2	3	12
Total	9	21	24
World Championships
Gold medal – first place	2019 Baku	5 Balls
Gold medal – first place	2025 Rio de Janeiro	Group All-Around
Silver medal – second place	2017 Pesaro	3 Ropes + 2 Balls
Silver medal – second place	2018 Sofia	5 Hoops
Silver medal – second place	2019 Baku	Group All-around
Silver medal – second place	2019 Baku	3 Hoops + 4 Clubs
Silver medal – second place	2025 Rio de Janeiro	5 Ribbons
Bronze medal – third place	2017 Pesaro	Group All-around
Bronze medal – third place	2021 Kitakyushu	5 Balls
Bronze medal – third place	2021 Kitakyushu	3 Hoops + 4 Clubs
Asian Championships
Gold medal – first place	2017 Astana	5 Hoops
Gold medal – first place	2017 Astana	3 Balls + 2 Ropes
Gold medal – first place	2017 Astana	Group All-around
Gold medal – first place	2019 Pattaya	Group All-around
Silver medal – second place	2019 Pattaya	5 Balls
Silver medal – second place	2022 Pattaya	Group All-around
Silver medal – second place	2022 Pattaya	3 Ribbons + 2 Balls
Silver medal – second place	2023 Manila	Group All-around
Silver medal – second place	2023 Manila	5 Hoops
Bronze medal – third place	2019 Pattaya	3 Hoops + 4 Clubs
Bronze medal – third place	2022 Pattaya	Team
Bronze medal – third place	2022 Pattaya	5 Hoops

Ayuka Suzuki (鈴木歩佳, Suzuki Ayuka; born 27 September 1999) is a Japanese former group rhythmic gymnast. She is the 2025 World group all-around champion, the 2019 World group all-around silver and the 2017 World group all-around bronze medalist. She represented Japan at the 2020 Summer Olympics in the group all-around.

== Career ==
Suzuki began rhythmic gymnastics when she was five years old. During her career, she was a member of the national team for 11 years.

=== 2017-2021 Olympic Cycle ===
Suzuki joined the Japanese national group in 2017 and won a bronze medal in the group all-around at the 2017 World Championships in Pesaro, Italy with her teammates, Mao Kunii, Rie Matsubara, Sayuri Sugimoto, Nanami Takenaka and Kiko Yokota. They also won a silver medal in the 3 ropes and 2 balls final the next day.

At the 2018 Minsk World Challenge Cup, Suzuki helped the group win the all-around bronze medal. Japan then won the gold medal in the 3 balls and 2 ropes final. At their next event, the Kazan World Challenge Cup, they won the bronze medal in the 3 balls and 2 ropes final. At the 2018 World Championships in Sofia, Bulgaria, they finished fifth in the all-around and won the silver medal in the 5 balls final behind Bulgaria.

On 16–22 September 2019, Suzuki and her teammates competed at the 2019 World Championships, her third. They won the silver medals in the group all-around and in the 3 hoops and 4 clubs final, and they won gold in the 5 balls final. This was Japan's first ever gold medal in a group event at the World Rhythmic Gymnastics Championships. Additionally, they matched Japan's best-ever group all-around result from 1975.

Suzuki represented Japan at the 2020 Summer Olympics alongside Rie Matsubara, Sakura Noshitani, Sayuri Sugimoto, and Nanami Takenaka. They advanced into the group all-around final and finished eighth after major mistakes in their 3 hoops and 4 clubs routine. After the Olympic Games, she competed at the 2021 World Championships, where Japan won bronze medals in both event finals and placed fourth in the all-around.

=== 2022-2024 Olympic Cycle ===
In April 2022, Suzuki competed at the World Cup in Sofia, where the group was 4th in the all-around, and won silver with 5 hoops as well as bronze with 3 ribbons and 2 balls. Later in the month, at the World Cup in Baku, the group was 5th overall and 4th with 5 hoops; they won silver in the mixed event. In the World Cup in Pesaro, she was 5th in the all-around, 9th with 5 hoops and 7th with 3 ribbons and 2 balls.

At the Asian Championships in Pattaya, she won bronze in teams and with 5 hoops and silver in the all-around and with 3 ribbon and 2 balls. Then in Cluj-Napoca, the last World Cup of the season, the group was 17th overall. At the World Championships in Sofia, Suzuki, with her teammates Mirika Hayashi, Fuka Ikuno, Chihana Nakamura, Rinako Inaki and Nanami Takenaka, took 8th place in the all-around and the 5th with 5 hoops.

In 2023, the Japanese group debuted at the World Cup in Athens, where they were 9th in the all-around. They did not qualify for either final. At the World Cup in Sofia, she was 8th overall, 4th with 5 hoops, and 10th with 3 ribbons and 2 balls. Next, at the World Cup in Baku, they finished 9th in the all-around, 12th with 5 hoops, and 8th in the mixed event. At the World Challenge Cup in Portimão, the group was 6th in the all-around and with 5 hoops, and they won bronze with 3 ribbons and 2 balls.

Competing at the Asian Championships, she won bronze in the all-around and silver with 5 hoops. At the World Cup in Cluj-Napoca, the Japanese group was 14th overall, 16th with 5 hoops and 12th with 3 ribbons and 2 balls. In August, she was selected for the World Championships in Valencia, along with Rina Imaoka, Chihana Nakamura, Megumi Nishimoto, Rinako Inaki and Hisano Taguchi. There, they ended 13th in the all-around and with 5 hoops, and they were 6th with 3 ribbons and 2 balls.

The next year, Suzuki helped Japan win the gold medals in both the 5 hoops and 3 ribbons and 2 balls finals at the 2024 Baku World Cup. At the 2024 Asian Championships, they finished second in the all-around to Uzbekistan and missed the continental Olympic berth. They won the gold medal in the 5 hoops final and finished second to Uzbekistan again in the 3 ribbons and 2 balls final.

=== 2025 ===
In 2025, Suzuki competed as a part of a rebuilt group. In February, she was one of four top athletes who left the national training camp and boycotted their training until they were persuaded to return later that day. The reasons the group gave for leaving were sexual harassment from an unnamed male trainer and harassment from the team coach Yukari Murata. Suzuki later said that she was not proud of leaving the camp and felt only gratitude for Murata. She said that she not personally experienced harassment, though she also noted that "I don’t even really know how harassment is defined".

The group won a silver medal in the all-around at the Sofia World Cup. They also won the silver medal in the 5 ribbons final and bronze in the 3 balls and 2 hoops final. In July, they won bronze in 5 ribbons and silver medals in both the all-around and 3 balls and 2 hoops final at Milan World Cup. The next week, they competed at Cluj-Napoca World Challenge Cup, where they took 4th place in the all-around and 7th place in the 5 ribbons final.

In late August, she was selected to represent Japan at the 2025 World Championships in Rio de Janeiro, Brazil alongside Natsumi Hanamura, Hatsune Miyoshi, Megumi Nishimoto, Rinako Inaki and Hisano Taguchi. They won the gold medal in the group all-around, 0.3 points in front of the Brazilian group, which was Japan's first all-around gold at the World Championships and making them the first World all-around champions from Asia. They also won the silver medal in the 5 ribbons final and took 5th place in the 3 balls and 2 hoops final.

In October, Suzuki, along with her teammate Rinako Inaki, announced her retirement. She said she had not yet thought of her future plans and wanted to rest for the time being.

== Personal life ==
Suzuki is studying at Nippon Sport Science University in Setagaya, Japan.
