= 2024 Asian Rhythmic Gymnastics Championships =

Gymnastics event in Tashkent, Uzbekistan

2024 Asian Gymnastics Championships
- Venue: Gymnastics Palace
- Location: Tashkent, Uzbekistan
- Start date: 2 May 2024
- End date: 4 May 2024

The 15th Rhythmic Gymnastics Asian Championships and the 20th Junior Asian Gymnastics Championships were held at the Gymnastics Palace in Tashkent, Uzbekistan from 2 to 4 May, 2024. The competition was a qualifying event for the 2024 Olympic Games. The Olympic quotas went to the winners of the all-around events, individual Elzhana Taniyeva and the group representing Uzbekistan.

== Medal winners ==
=== Senior ===
Event	Gold	Silver	Bronze
All-around
Individual	(Kazakhstan) Elzhana Taniyeva	(Uzbekistan) Takhmina Ikromova	(Japan) Reina Matsusaka
Team	Uzbekistan; Senior Individual; Takhmina Ikromova; Anastasiya Sarantseva; Nataliya Usova; Senior Group; Evelina Atalyants; Shakhzoda Ibragimova; Mumtozabonu Iskhokzoda; Amaliya Mamedova; Irodakhon Sadikova	Kazakhstan; Senior Individual; Elzhana Taniyeva; Aibota Yertaikyzy; Senior Group; Aksungkar Abdirakhman; Sofiya An; Ayaulym Kadir; Aruzhan Kalsayeva; Bayan Koibakar; Mariya Korniyenko	Japan; Senior Individual; Mirano Kita; Reina Matsusaka; Senior Group; Fuka Ikuno; Rinako Inaki; Megumi Nishimoto; Ayuka Suzuki; Hisano Taguchi; Nanami Takenaka
Group	Uzbekistan; Evelina Atalyants; Shakhzoda Ibragimova; Mumtozabonu Iskhokzoda; Amaliya Mamedova; Irodakhon Sadikova	Japan; Fuka Ikuno; Rinako Inaki; Megumi Nishimoto; Ayuka Suzuki; Hisano Taguchi; Nanami Takenaka	Kazakhstan; Aksungkar Abdirakhman; Sofiya An; Ayaulym Kadir; Aruzhan Kalsayeva; Bayan Koibakar; Mariya Korniyenko
Individual
Hoop	(Kazakhstan) Elzhana Taniyeva	(Japan) Reina Matsusaka	(Kazakhstan) Aibota Yertaikyzy
Ball	(Uzbekistan) Takhmina Ikromova	(Kazakhstan) Aibota Yertaikyzy	(Kazakhstan) Elzhana Taniyeva
Clubs	(Uzbekistan) Takhmina Ikromova	(Uzbekistan) Nataliya Usova	(Japan) Reina Matsusaka
Ribbon	(Kazakhstan) Aibota Yertaikyzy	(Uzbekistan) Takhmina Ikromova	(Japan) Reina Matsusaka
Group
5 hoops	Japan; Fuka Ikuno; Rinako Inaki; Megumi Nishimoto; Ayuka Suzuki; Hisano Taguchi; Nanami Takenaka	Uzbekistan; Evelina Atalyants; Shakhzoda Ibragimova; Mumtozabonu Iskhokzoda; Amaliya Mamedova; Irodakhon Sadikova	Kazakhstan; Aksungkar Abdirakhman; Sofiya An; Ayaulym Kadir; Aruzhan Kalsayeva; Bayan Koibakar; Mariya Korniyenko
3 ribbons + 2 Balls	Uzbekistan; Evelina Atalyants; Shakhzoda Ibragimova; Mumtozabonu Iskhokzoda; Amaliya Mamedova; Irodakhon Sadikova	Japan; Fuka Ikuno; Rinako Inaki; Megumi Nishimoto; Ayuka Suzuki; Hisano Taguchi; Nanami Takenaka	Kazakhstan; Aksungkar Abdirakhman; Sofiya An; Ayaulym Kadir; Aruzhan Kalsayeva; Bayan Koibakar; Mariya Korniyenko

=== Junior ===
Event	Gold	Silver	Bronze
All-around
All-Around	(China) Wang Qi	(Kazakhstan) Akmaral Yerekesheva	(Kuwait) Noor Alrezaihan
Group	Uzbekistan; Yosina Djuraeva; Fatima El Sankari; Alana Khafizova; Milana Safina; Kristina Shin; Ravshana Shaabdurakhmanova	Kazakhstan; Ayaulym Sultanbayeva; Yerkezhan Sagat; Yekaterina Radysh; Inkar Satemirova; Ayaulym Shanibek; Adiya Amantayeva	Japan; Hatsune Miyoshi; Rin Manabe; Yuna Tanaka; Rin Matsuda; Ran Matsuda; Anona Mashima
Individual
Hoop	(Uzbekistan) Viktoriya Nikiforova	(China) Wang Qi	(Kazakhstan) Dariya Kusherbayeva
Ball	(Uzbekistan) Lola Djuraeva	(Kazakhstan) Akmaral Yerekesheva	(Kyrgyzstan) Arina Gazieva
Clubs	(South Korea) Park Seohyun	(Uzbekistan) Sofiya Usova	(Kazakhstan) Akmaral Yerekesheva
Ribbon	(Kazakhstan) Akmaral Yerekesheva	(Uzbekistan) Mishel Nesterova	(China) Wang Qi
Group
5 hoops	Uzbekistan; Yosina Djuraeva; Fatima El Sankari; Alana Khafizova; Milana Safina; Kristina Shin; Ravshana Shaabdurakhmanova	Kazakhstan; Ayaulym Sultanbayeva; Yerkezhan Sagat; Yekaterina Radysh; Inkar Satemirova; Ayaulym Shanibek; Adiya Amantayeva	Japan; Hatsune Miyoshi; Rin Manabe; Yuna Tanaka; Rin Matsuda; Ran Matsuda; Anona Mashima
5 clubs	Uzbekistan; Yosina Djuraeva; Fatima El Sankari; Alana Khafizova; Milana Safina; Kristina Shin; Ravshana Shaabdurakhmanova	Kazakhstan; Ayaulym Sultanbayeva; Yerkezhan Sagat; Yekaterina Radysh; Inkar Satemirova; Ayaulym Shanibek; Adiya Amantayeva	Japan; Hatsune Miyoshi; Rin Manabe; Yuna Tanaka; Rin Matsuda; Ran Matsuda; Anona Mashima

== Results ==
=== Senior ===
==== Individual All-Around ====
Rank	Gymnast	Nation	Hoop (rhythmic gymnastics)	Ball (rhythmic gymnastics)	Clubs (rhythmic gymnastics)	Ribbon (rhythmic gymnastics)	Total
1st place, gold medalist(s)	Elzhana Taniyeva	Kazakhstan	34.30 (1)	33.85 (2)	34.00 (2)	31.25 (4)	133.40
2nd place, silver medalist(s)	Takhmina Ikromova	Uzbekistan	29,70 (11)	34.85 (1)	34.25 (1)	31.35 (3)	130.15
3rd place, bronze medalist(s)	Reina Matsusaka	Japan	33.45 (4)	31.20 (6)	32.05 (5)	31.05 (5)	127.75
4	Wang Zilu	China	33.80 (3)	32.90 (3)	32.45 (3)	27.80 (9)	126.95
5	Aibota Yertaikyzy	Kazakhstan	33.85 (2)	31.30 (5)	30.05 (7)	31.70 (1)	126.90
6	Mirano Kita	Japan	31.85 (6)	29.75 (7)	29.10 (9)	29.65 (6)	120.35
7	Jiin Sohn	South Korea	29.75 (10)	29.10 (9)	30.70 (6)	26.45 (13)	116.00
8	Zhao Yating	China	30.15 (7)	27.40 (16)	29.35 (8)	28.55 (7)	115.45
9	Mikayla Angeline Yang	Singapore	29.55 (13)	29.15 (8)	27.85 (12)	27.05 (11)	113.60
10	Breanna Labadan	Philippines	29.65 (12)	28.00 (12)	28.05 (11)	27.75 (10)	113.45
11	Suyi Ha	South Korea	28.15 (15)	27.55 (14)	28.95 (10)	28.00 (8)	112.65
12	Aleksandra Udodova	Kyrgyzstan	28.35 (14)	26.85 (17)	26.65 (15)	23.15 (18)	105.00
13	Jasmine Althea Ramilo	Philippines	29.80 (9)	25.10 (25)	27.30 (13)	22.05 (22)	104.25
14	Weng Qin Mavia Wong	Malaysia	27.45 (18)	25.65 (21)	25.25 (18)	24.40 (15)	102.75
15	Elizaveta Golinko	Kyrgyzstan	25.85 (21)	25.55 (22)	24.60 (20)	26.75 (12)	102.75
16	Yu Jong Pak	North Korea	25.20 (23)	26.35 (19)	24.55 (21)	23.55 (17)	99.65
17	Yi-Tong Lai	Chinese Taipei	27.45 (17)	26.70 (18)	21.65 (25)	23.85 (16)	99.65
18	Piyada Peeramatukorn	Thailand	26.10 (20)	25.30 (23)	24.10 (23)	22.90 (19)	98.40
19	Hyang Sim	North Korea	24.65 (24)	25.20 (24)	24.05 (24)	22.55 (21)	96.45
20	Praewa Misato Philaphandeth	Laos	25.70 (22)	25.75 (20)	20.50 (27)	21.30 (25)	93.25
21	Muskan Rana	India	24.05 (26)	24.35 (26)	20.65 (26)	20.70 (27)	89.75
22	Tri Wahyuni	Indonesia	24.30 (25)	23.35 (28)	20.20 (28)	21.65 (24)	89.50
23	Sutjiati Narendra	Indonesia	22.10 (29)	22.35 (29)	19.95 (29)	18.05 (30)	82.45
24	Pebbyl Jing Ya Ang	Singapore	27.75 (16)	28.35 (10)	26.15 (16)		82.25
25	Yun Jo Lai	Malaysia	27.90 (13)		27.25 (14)	25.50 (14)	80.65
26	Mareya Wae-U-Seng	Thailand	21.25 (30)	21.50 (31)	18.70 (31)	19.10 (29)	80.55
27	Tzu-Wen Li	Chinese Taipei	27.25 (19)	28.30 (11)	24.25 (22)		79.80
28	Lkhagvatsetseg Erdenebayar	Mongolia	23.75 (28)	27.50 (15)	25.65 (17)		76.90
29	Kai Wing Lam	Hong Kong	19.50 (33)	22.00 (30)	16.70 (34)	18.00 (31)	76.20
30	Wai Yin Ma	Hong Kong	19.70 (32)	19.40 (33)	17.05 (33)	15.20 (33)	71.35
31	Maha Alsaqer	Kuwait	19.20 (34)	18.90 (34)	17.45 (32)	15.15 (34)	70.70
32	Anujin Narangerel	Mongolia	23.85 (27)	23.45 (27)		20.10 (28)	67.40
33	Nataliya Usova	Uzbekistan	33.15 (5)		32.20 (4)		65.350
34	Anastasiya Sarantseva	Uzbekistan		32.65 (4)		31.35 (2)	64.00
35	Ankhtamir Zolbayar	Mongolia			24.70 (19)	22.75 (20)	47.45
36	Manya	India	21.10 (32)		19.55 (30)		40.650
37	Nishka Kale	India	21.25 (31)			16.35 (32)	37.60
38	Ng Joe Ee	Malaysia	29.90 (8)				29.90
39	Fan-xi Peng	Chinese Taipei				21.90 (23)	21.90
40	Maeve Yuumi Teo	Singapore				21.00 (26)	21.00
41	Yu Jong Pak	North Korea	DNS	DNS	DNS	DNS	

==== Hoop ====
Rank	Gymnast	Nation	Total
1st place, gold medalist(s)	Elzhana Taniyeva	Kazakhstan	33.900
2nd place, silver medalist(s)	Reina Matsusaka	Japan	33.300
3rd place, bronze medalist(s)	Aibota Yertaikyzy	Kazakhstan	33.250
4	Wang Zilu	China	32.900
5	Nataliya Usova	Uzbekistan	32.550
6	Mirano Kita	Japan	32.350
7	Ng Joe Ee	Malaysia	31.300
8	Zhao Yating	China	28.650

==== Ball ====
Rank	Gymnast	Nation	Total
1st place, gold medalist(s)	Takhmina Ikromova	Uzbekistan	33.900
2nd place, silver medalist(s)	Aibota Yertaikyzy	Kazakhstan	32.650
3rd place, bronze medalist(s)	Elzhana Taniyeva	Kazakhstan	32.600
4	Reina Matsusaka	Japan	32.400
5	Anastasiya Sarantseva	Uzbekistan	32.250
6	Wang Zilu	China	31.900
7	Mirano Kita	Japan	31.600
8	Mikayla Angeline Yang	Singapore	29.050

==== Clubs ====
Rank	Gymnast	Nation	Total
1st place, gold medalist(s)	Takhmina Ikromova	Uzbekistan	34.200
2nd place, silver medalist(s)	Nataliya Usova	Uzbekistan	32.500
3rd place, bronze medalist(s)	Reina Matsusaka	Japan	32.200
4	Wang Zilu	China	32.100
5	Elzhana Taniyeva	Kazakhstan	30.800
6	Aibota Yertaikyzy	Kazakhstan	30.150
7	Zhao Yating	China	28.400
8	Sohn Ji-in	South Korea	28.250

==== Ribbon ====
Rank	Gymnast	Nation	Total
1st place, gold medalist(s)	Aibota Yertaikyzy	Kazakhstan	32.900
2nd place, silver medalist(s)	Takhmina Ikromova	Uzbekistan	32.500
3rd place, bronze medalist(s)	Reina Matsusaka	Japan	31.300
4	Elzhana Taniyeva	Kazakhstan	31.050
5	Anastasiya Sarantseva	Uzbekistan	30.800
6	Mirano Kita	Japan	29.900
7	Zhao Yating	China	28.300
8	Suyi Ha	South Korea	27.050

==== Groups All-Around ====
Place	Nation	5	3 + 2	Total
1st place, gold medalist(s)	Uzbekistan	36.600 (1)	33.350 (1)	69.950
2nd place, silver medalist(s)	Japan	36.000 (2)	32.750 (2)	68.750
3rd place, bronze medalist(s)	Kazakhstan	32.050 (3)	29.250 (3)	61.300
4	South Korea	28.250 (4)	27.250 (4)	55.500
5	North Korea	27.350 (5)	21.450 (6)	48.800
6	Malaysia	26.850 (6)	21.350 (7)	48.200
7	Chinese Taipei	25.950 (7)	22.000 (5)	47.950
8	Kyrgyzstan	21.900 (8)	17.050 (8)	38.950
9	India	16.100 (9)	8.300 (9)	24.400

==== 5 Hoops ====
Rank	Nation	Total
1st place, gold medalist(s)	Japan	36.35
2nd place, silver medalist(s)	Uzbekistan	35.75
3rd place, bronze medalist(s)	Kazakhstan	32.10
4	North Korea	29.60
5	Malaysia	27.30
6	South Korea	24.05
7	Chinese Taipei	23.30
8	Kyrgyzstan	18.40

==== 3 Ribbons + 2 Balls ====
Rank	Nation	Total
1st place, gold medalist(s)	Uzbekistan	32.35
2nd place, silver medalist(s)	Japan	32.20
3rd place, bronze medalist(s)	Kazakhstan	29.65
4	North Korea	25.65
5	Chinese Taipei	23.00
6	Kyrgyzstan	19.65
7	Malaysia	19.45
8	South Korea	17.25

=== Junior ===
==== Group All-Around ====
Rank	Nation	5	5	Total
1st place, gold medalist(s)	Uzbekistan	29.75	28.25	58.00
2nd place, silver medalist(s)	Kazakhstan	27.10	29.10	56.20
3rd place, bronze medalist(s)	Japan	27.05	24.30	51.35
4	Kyrgyzstan	25.45	24.95	50.40
5	South Korea	23.80	18.20	42.00
6	India	16.10	15.05	31.15

==== 5 Hoops ====
Rank	Gymnast	Total
1st place, gold medalist(s)	Uzbekistan	30.65
2nd place, silver medalist(s)	Kazakhstan	29.40
3rd place, bronze medalist(s)	Japan	28.00
4	Kyrgyzstan	26.05
5	South Korea	24.70
6	India	12.95

==== 5 Pair of Clubs ====
Rank	Nation	Total
1st place, gold medalist(s)	Uzbekistan	30.25
2nd place, silver medalist(s)	Kazakhstan	29.05
3rd place, bronze medalist(s)	Japan	25.35
4	Kyrgyzstan	25.10
5	South Korea	25.05
6	India	14.05

==== Hoop ====
Rank	Gymnast	Nation	Total
1st place, gold medalist(s)	Viktoriya Nikiforova	Uzbekistan	30.50
2nd place, silver medalist(s)	Wang Qi	China	29.20
3rd place, bronze medalist(s)	Dariya Kusherbayeva	Kazakhstan	28.70
4	Seohyun Park	South Korea	26.95
5	Saigna Sarynzhieva	Kyrgyzstan	26.40
6	Thea Chew	Singapore	26.20
7	Yua Inoue	Japan	24.45
8	Noor Alrezhaihan	Kuwait	22.30

==== Ball ====
Rank	Gymnast	Nation	Total
1st place, gold medalist(s)	Lola Djuraeva	Uzbekistan	29.70
2nd place, silver medalist(s)	Akmaral Yerekesheva	Kazakhstan	29.55
3rd place, bronze medalist(s)	Arina Gazieva	Kyrgyzstan	28.20
4	Wang Qi	China	27.85
5	Seohyun Park	South Korea	27.85
6	Yua Inoue	Japan	25.90
7	Mirabelle Yu Chelle Yet	Singapore	24.70
8	Phatsaphon Thapthong	Thailand	21.65

==== Clubs ====
Rank	Gymnast	Nation	Total
1st place, gold medalist(s)	Seonhyun Park	South Korea	28.80
2nd place, silver medalist(s)	Sofiya Usova	Uzbekistan	28.35
3rd place, bronze medalist(s)	Akmaral Yerekesheva	Kazakhstan	27.55
4	Wang Qi	China	26.05
5	Zlata Arkatova	Kyrgyzstan	25.40
6	Yua Inoue	Japan	25.30
7	Phatsaphon Thapthong	Thailand	23.90
8	Mirabelle Yu Chelle Yet	Singapore	23.40

==== Ribbon ====
Rank	Gymnast	Nation	Total
1st place, gold medalist(s)	Akmaral Yerekesheva	Kazakhstan	29.80
2nd place, silver medalist(s)	Mishel Nesterova	Uzbekistan	28.55
3rd place, bronze medalist(s)	Wang Qi	China	27.70
4	Seonhyun Park	South Korea	25.50
5	Kou Okada	Japan	25.15
6	Elima Abdimalikova	Kyrgyzstan	25.15
7	Nur Zhafirah Wong Rudy Kurniawan	Malaysia	23.20
8	Enerel Ayanga	Mongolia	20.05

== Overall medal table ==
* Host nation (Uzbekistan)

Rank	Nation	Gold	Silver	Bronze	Total
1	Uzbekistan*	9	6	0	15
2	Kazakhstan	4	6	7	17
3	Japan	1	3	6	10
4	China	1	1	1	3
5	South Korea	1	0	0	1
6	Kuwait	0	0	1	1
6	Kyrgyzstan	0	0	1	1
Totals (7 entries)		16	16	16	48
