= Hisano Taguchi =

Japanese rhythmic gymnast

- Born: 15 September 2006 (age 20) Chiba Prefecture, Japan

Gymnastics career
- Discipline: Rhythmic gymnastics
- Country represented: Japan; (2022-present)
- Club: Adachi Rhythmic Gymnastics Club
- Head coaches: Rika Yamamoto, Yukari Murata
Medal record
Group rhythmic gymnastics
Representing Japan
Event	1st	2nd	3rd
World Championships	1	2	0
Total	1	2	0
World Championships
Gold medal – first place	2025 Rio de Janeiro	Group All-Around
Silver medal – second place	2025 Rio de Janeiro	5 Ribbons
Silver medal – second place	2026 Frankfurt	Group All-Around
Asian Games
Silver medal – second place	2026 Aichi-Nagoya	Group All-around
Asian Championships
Gold medal – first place	2024 Tashkent	5 Hoops
Silver medal – second place	2023 Manila	5 Hoops
Silver medal – second place	2024 Tashkent	Group All-Around
Silver medal – second place	2024 Tashkent	3 Ribbons + 2 Balls
Bronze medal – third place	2023 Manila	All-around

Hisano Taguchi (Japanese: 田口久乃, Hepburn: Taguchi Hisano) (born 15 September 2006) is a Japanese rhythmic gymnast. She is the 2025 World group all-around champion and the 2026 World group all-around silver medalist.

== Career ==
Taguchi competed as individual at the 2022 World Games in Birmingham, United States. She was 19th in Hoop, 14th in Ball, 21st in Clubs and 18th in Ribbon.

=== 2023 ===
In 2023, she integrated to main senior group of Japan. She debuted on international level at the World Cup in Athens, being 9th in the All-Around and did not qualify for finals. In Sofia she was 8th overall, 4th with 5 hoops, and 10th with 3 ribbons & 2 balls. In Baku they finished 9th in the All-Around, 12th with 5 hoops and 8th in the mixed event. In Portimão the group was 6th in the All-Around and with 5 hoops, and won bronze with 3 ribbons & 2 balls. Competing at the Asian Championships she won bronze in the All-Around and silver with 5 hoops. In the World Cup in Cluj-Napoca Japan was 14th overall, 16th with 5 hoops and 12th with 3 ribbons & 2 balls. In August she was selected, along Rina Imaoka, Chihana Nakamura, Megumi Nishimoto, Ayuka Suzuki and Rinako Inaki, for the World Championships in Valencia, being 13th in the All-Around and with 5 hoops, 6th with 3 ribbons & 2 balls.

=== 2024 ===
In 2024 the Japanese group was 11th overall at the World Cup in Sofia. In April they took 5th place in the All-Around and two golds in the event finals at the stage in Baku. A month later Taguchi, Fuka Ikuno, Megumi Nishimoto, Ayuka Suzuki, Rinako Inaki and Nanami Takenaka participated in the Asian Championships, winning silver in the All-Around and with 3 ribbons & 2 balls as well as gold with 5 hoops, thus missing the qualification quota for Paris 2024.

=== 2025 ===
In 2025, she competed as a part of a renewed group and won silver medal in all-around at Sofia World Cup. They also won silver medal in 5 ribbons and bronze in 3 balls + 2 hoops finals. In July, they bronze in 5 ribbons and silver medals in all-around and 3 balls + 2 hoops at Milan World Cup. Next week, they competed at Cluj-Napoca World Challenge Cup, where they took 4th place in all-around and 7th place in 5 ribbons final. In late August, she was selected to represent Japan alongside Natsumi Hanamura, Hatsune Miyoshi, Megumi Nishimoto, Ayuka Suzuki and Rinako Inaki at the 2025 World Championships in Rio de Janeiro, Brazil. They won gold medal in group all-around, 0.3 point in front of Brazil, being the first World all-around champions from Asia. They also won silver medal in 5 ribbons final and took 5th place in 3 balls + 2 hoops final.

=== 2026 ===
In 2026, Taguchi remained in the group after teammates Ayuka Suzuki and Rinako Inaki retiring. She and her group took 6th place in all-around and 5th in 3 hoops + 4 clubs final at the Sofia World Cup. They took another 6th place in all-around at the Tashkent World Cup and 4th place in 5 balls final. They were 9th in all-around at Baku World Cup. In June, they took 6th place in all-around at Beijing World Challenge Cup. In July, they ended on 5th place in all-around and 8th place in 3 hoops + 4 clubs final at Milan World Cup.

In August, she was selected to represent Japan alongside Rin Manabe, Megumi Nishimoto, Natsumi Hanamura, Kaseno Tanabe and Yuna Tanaka at the 2026 World Championships in Frankfurt, Germany. They won silver medal in group all-around event, which earned them a quota for the 2028 Olympic Games. In apparatus finals, they took 4th place in 3 hoops + 4 clubs and 7th place in 5 balls.
