= Kusherbayeva =

Kusherbayeva is a surname. Notable people with the surname include:

- Dariya Kusherbayeva
- Gulnara Kusherbayeva
