= Ng Joe Ee =

Malaysian rhythmic gymnast (born 2005)

Ng Joe Ee 吴祖儿
- Full name: Ng Joe Ee
- Born: 14 December 2005 (age 20) Kuala Lumpur, Malaysia
- Height: 143 cm (4 ft 8 in)

Gymnastics career
- Discipline: Rhythmic gymnastics
- Country represented: Malaysia
- Club: Wilayah Persekutuan
- Head coach: Julia Ivanova
- Choreographer: Ildar Kolesyanov
- Retired: yes
Medal record
Representing Malaysia
Women's Rhythmic gymnastics
Commonwealth Games
Gold medal – first place	2022 Birmingham	Ball
Gold medal – first place	2022 Birmingham	Ribbon
Southeast Asian Games
Gold medal – first place	2025 Thailand	Team
Silver medal – second place	2021 Vietnam	All-around
Bronze medal – third place	2025 Thailand	All-around

Ng Joe Ee

Chinese name
- Traditional Chinese: 吳祖兒
- Simplified Chinese: 吴祖儿
Transcriptions
Standard Mandarin
- Hanyu Pinyin: Wú Zǔ'ér
- Wade–Giles: Wu2 Tsu3 Êrh2
Hakka
- Pha̍k-fa-sṳ: Ǹg Tsú-yì
Yue: Cantonese
- Jyutping: Ng4 Zou2 Ji4
Southern Min
- Hokkien POJ: Gô͘ Chó͘-jî
- Tâi-lô: Gôo Tsóo-jî

Ng Joe Ee (born 14 December 2005) is a retired Malaysian individual rhythmic gymnast. She won two gold medals at the 2022 Commonwealth Games.

== Gymnastics career ==
Ng began rhythmic gymnastics when she was four years old; she admired the leotards the gymnasts wore, and her mother said she would have to train in the sport to wear them.

Ng competed at the 2021 SEA Games and won the silver medal in the all-around behind teammate Koi Sie Yan. She finished 27th in the all-around at the 2022 Baku World Cup. She then represented Malaysia at the 2022 Commonwealth Games and finished fourth in the team event alongside Koi Sie Yan and Izzah Amzan. She qualified for the individual all-around final and finished fifth. She won gold medals in both the ball and ribbon apparatus finals.

At the 2023 Tashkent World Cup, Ng finished 26th in the all-around. She then finished 12th in the all-around at the 2023 Asian Championships. In July, she was awarded the 2022 National Sportswoman award. The next month, she finished 53rd in the qualification round at the 2023 World Championships. Heading into the Asian Games, Ng injured her back and tore a ligament in her ankle. She still chose to compete and finished 11th in the all-around final.

Ng finished fifth in the all-around at the 2024 Bosphorus Cup in Istanbul. In the event finals, she finished eighth with the hoop and fourth with the ball and the clubs. She advanced into the hoop final at the 2024 Asian Championships and finished seventh. This was the only apparatus she competed due to re-aggravating her back injury.

The next year, she won a bronze medal in the ribbon final at the 2025 Sofia Cup, and she placed 12th in the all-around. At the 2025 Asian Championships, she placed tenth in the all-around. She advanced into the clubs and ribbon final and finished eighth in both. In July, she competed in the World Cup Challenge Cluj-Napoca and finished 25th in the all-around.

She finished 42nd in the qualification round at the 2025 World Championships.

In December, she won a shared bronze medal in the all-around with Piyada Peeramatukorn at the 2025 SEA Games in Thailand, behind Jasmine Ramilo and Mikayla Angeline Yang, as well as a gold in the team event. A day later, she announced her retirement due to injuries; she had been training despite persistent pain in her back, problems with her neck, and an injury to her left ankle. She said she planned to move on to coaching young gymnasts.
