= Irodakhon Sadikova =

Uzbekistani rhythmic gymnast (born 2007)

- Full name: Irodakhon Ilkhamovna Sadikova
- Nickname: Iroda
- Born: 5 September 2007 (age 19) Tashkent, Uzbekistan

Gymnastics career
- Discipline: Rhythmic gymnastics
- Country represented: Uzbekistan; (2023 - present)
- Head coach: Rano Mukhamedova
- Assistant coach: Luiza Ganieva
- Choreographer: Maria Akhrarova
Medal record
Representing Uzbekistan
Rhythmic gymnastics
Event	1st	2nd	3rd
FIG World Cup	0	0	1
Total	0	0	1
Asian Championships
Gold medal – first place	2023 Manila	Team
Gold medal – first place	2024 Tashkent	Team
Gold medal – first place	2024 Tashkent	Group all-around
Gold medal – first place	2024 Tashkent	3 ribbons + 2 balls
Silver medal – second place	2023 Manila	Group all-around
Silver medal – second place	2023 Manila	3 Ribbons + 2 Balls
Silver medal – second place	2024 Tashkent	5 Hoops

Irodakhon Ilkhamovna Sadikova (born 5 September 2007) is an Uzbekistani rhythmic gymnast. At the 2024 Asian Championships, she competed with the group that won the all-around title and qualified for the 2024 Summer Olympics, where they finished eighth in the group all-around final.

== Career ==
=== 2023 ===
Sadikova became age-eligible for senior competition in 2023 and joined the senior national group. At the 2023 Tashkent World Cup, she won bronze medals in the group all-around and in the 5 hoops final. She competed at the 2023 Asian Championships in Manila, where the group won gold in the team event with the individual Uzbekistani gymnasts. The group also won silver medals in the all-around and with 3 ribbons and 2 balls, both behind China. She then competed at the 2023 World Championships where her group finished 15th in the all-around. Additionally, the Uzbekistan team finished 10th.

=== 2024 ===
In 2024, Sadikova won a bronze medal with her group at the Thiais Grand Prix in 3 ribbons and 2 balls. The next month, they won a silver medal in the 3 ribbons and 2 balls final at the Tashkent World Cup. Then at the 2024 Asian Championships, the Uzbekistani group won gold in the all-around. Their placement earned them a berth for the 2024 Summer Olympics. The group also won the gold medal in the 3 ribbons + 2 balls final and the silver medal behind Japan in the 5 hoops final. They also won the team gold medal alongside Uzbekistan's individual gymnasts.

Sadikova represented Uzbekistan at the 2024 Summer Olympics alongside Amaliya Mamedova, Shakhzoda Ibragimova, Mumtozabonu Iskhokzoda, and Evelina Atalyants. The group advanced to the group all-around final in seventh place, where they ultimately finished eighth.

=== 2025 ===
Competing at the World Cup in Tashkent the group was 4th with 5 ribbons and won silver in the All-Around and bronze with 3 balls & 2 hoops. In May she took part in the Asian Championships in Singapore, winning gold in teams and with 5 ribbons, silver with 3 balls & 2 hoops as well as bronze in the All-Around. At the World Cup's stage in Milan they were 5th with 5 ribbons and 6th in the mixed event. In August she was selected for the World Championships in Rio de Janeiro along Evelina Atalyants, Adelya Fayzulina, Mumtozabonu Iskhokzoda, Amaliya Mamedova and Maftuna Zoirova. There they were 14th in the All-Around, 8th with 5 ribbons, 27th with 3 balls & 2 hoops and 7th in teams.

=== 2026 ===
At the World Cup in Baku the Uzbek group won silver in the 5 balls final.
