= Hatsune Miyoshi =

Japanese rhythmic gymnast

- 三好 初音
- Born: 25 June 2009 (age 17)

Gymnastics career
- Discipline: Rhythmic Gymnastics
- Country represented: Japan; (2025–present)
- Club: Kanonji RG
- Head coaches: Rika Yamamoto, Yukari Murata
- Former coach: Teruyo Miki
- Choreographer: Zhanina Ivanova
Medal record
Group rhythmic gymnastics
Representing Japan
Event	1st	2nd	3rd
World Championships	1	1	0
World Cup	1	4	2
Total	2	5	2
World Championships
Gold medal – first place	2025 Rio de Janeiro	Group All-Around
Silver medal – second place	2025 Rio de Janeiro	5 Ribbons
Junior Asian Championships
Bronze medal – third place	2024 Tashkent	Group All-around
Bronze medal – third place	2024 Tashkent	10 Clubs
Bronze medal – third place	2024 Tashkent	5 Hoops

Hatsune Miyoshi (Japanese: 三好 初音, born 25 June 2009), is a Japanese rhythmic gymnast. She won a gold medal in the all-around team event at the 2025 Rhythmic Gymnastics World Championships in Rio de Janeiro.

== Career ==
Miyoshi took up rhythmic gymnastics at the age of 5 at the Kanonji RG club.

=== Junior ===
In 2024, Miyoshi was part of the Japanese junior team alongside Rin Manabe, Yuna Tanaka, Rin Matsuda, Ran Matsuda and Anona Mashima. On May 2-4, the group competed at the 2024 Asian Championships in Tashkent, Uzbekistan. They won bronze medals in all-around, 5 hoops and 10 clubs.

=== Senior ===
In 2025, she joined the main senior group and won a silver medal in the all-around event at the Sofia World Cup. The team also won the silver medal in 5 ribbons and bronze in 3 balls + 2 hoops finals. In July, the team won bronze in 5 ribbons and silver medals in the all-around and 3 balls + 2 hoops events at Milan World Cup. The following week, the team competed at Cluj-Napoca World Challenge Cup, where they took 4th place in the all-around event and 7th place in the 5 ribbons final.

In late August, Miyoshi was selected a member of the Japanese team to the 2025 World Championships in Rio de Janeiro, Brazil alongside Megumi Nishimoto, Ayuka Suzuki, Rinako Inaki and Hisano Taguchi. The team won the gold medal in all-around team event, the country's first. At 16, Miyoshi also became the youngest gold medal winner at the world championships. The team finished 0.3 points in front of Brazil, becoming the first world all-around champions from Asia. They also won the silver medal in the 5 ribbons final, and took 5th place in the 3 balls + 2 hoops final.
