= Amaliya Mamedova =

Uzbekistani rhythmic gymnast (born 2008)

- Full name: Amaliya Parvizovna Mamedova
- Born: 29 August 2008 (age 18) Samarkand, Uzbekistan

Gymnastics career
- Discipline: Rhythmic gymnastics
- Country represented: Uzbekistan
- Club: Samarkand School of Rhythmic Gymnastics
- Head coach: Maftuna Shamsieva
Medal record
Rhythmic gymnastics
Representing Uzbekistan
Event	1st	2nd	3rd
FIG World Cup	0	0	2
Total	0	0	2
Asian Championships
Gold medal – first place	2024 Tashkent	Team
Gold medal – first place	2024 Tashkent	Group all-around
Gold medal – first place	2024 Tashkent	3 ribbons + 2 balls
Gold medal – first place	2026 Bishkek	Team
Gold medal – first place	2026 Bishkek	Group All-Around
Silver medal – second place	2024 Tashkent	5 hoops

Amaliya Parvizovna Mamedova (born 29 August 2008; Russian: Амалия Парвизовна Мамедова) is an Uzbekistani rhythmic gymnast. She won three gold medals at the 2024 Asian Championships. She represented Uzbekistan at the 2024 Summer Olympics in the group all-around. At the junior level, she is the 2023 Asian group all-around champion.

== Career ==
Mamedova competed at the 2023 Junior World Championships in Cluj-Napoca where Uzbekistan's junior group placed 15th in the all-around. Additionally, Uzbekistan placed sixth in the team competition. At the 2023 Asian Championships in Manila, she won a gold medal with Uzbekistan's junior group in the all-around. Additionally, the group won silver medals in both event finals.

Mamedova became age-eligible for senior international competition in 2024 and joined Uzbekistan's senior group. She won a bronze medal in the 3 ribbons and 2 balls final at the Thiais Grand Prix. Then at the Tashkent World Cup, she won a silver medal in the 3 ribbons and 2 balls event final. At the 2024 Asian Championships held in Tashkent, she won a gold medal in the group all-around, helping Uzbekistan qualify for the 2024 Olympic Games. The group also won the gold medal in the 3 ribbons + 2 balls final and the silver medal behind Japan in the 5 hoops final. The group also won the team gold medal alongside Uzbekistan's individual gymnasts.

Mamedova was selected to represent Uzbekistan at the 2024 Summer Olympics alongside Evelina Atalyants, Shakhzoda Ibragimova, Mumtozabonu Iskhokzoda, and Irodakhon Sadikova.
