= Rin Manabe =

Japanese Rhythmic Gymnast

- 真鍋 凛
- Born: 10 December 2009 (age 16) Kanonji, Kagawa, Japan

Gymnastics career
- Discipline: Rhythmic Gymnastics
- Country represented: Japan; (2026–present)
- Club: Kanonji RG
- Head coaches: Rika Yamamoto, Yukari Murata
- Choreographer: Zhanina Ivanova
Medal record
Group rhythmic gymnastics
Representing Japan
World Championships
Silver medal – second place	2026 Frankfurt	Group All-Around
Junior Asian Championships
Bronze medal – third place	2024 Tashkent	Group All-around
Bronze medal – third place	2024 Tashkent	10 Clubs
Bronze medal – third place	2024 Tashkent	5 Hoops

Rin Manabe (Japanese: 真鍋 凛, born 10 December 2009) is a Japanese rhythmic gymnast. She represents Japan internationally as a member of the national group.

== Career ==
=== Junior ===
In 2024, Manabe was part of the Japanese junior team alongside Hatsune Miyoshi, Yuna Tanaka, Rin Matsuda, Ran Matsuda and Anona Mashima. On May 2-4, the group competed at the 2024 Asian Championships in Tashkent, Uzbekistan. They won bronze medals in all-around, 5 hoops and 10 clubs.

=== Senior ===
In 2026, Manabe joined national senior group. She and her group took 6th place in all-around and 5th in 3 hoops + 4 clubs final at the Sofia World Cup. They took another 6th place in all-around at the Tashkent World Cup and 4th place in 5 balls final. They were 9th in all-around at Baku World Cup. In June, they took 6th place in all-around at Beijing World Challenge Cup. In July, they ended on 5th place in all-around and 8th place in 3 hoops + 4 clubs final at Milan World Cup.

In August, she was selected to represent Japan alongside Yuna Tanaka, Megumi Nishimoto, Hisano Taguchi, Kaseno Tanabe and Natsumi Hanamura at the 2026 World Championships in Frankfurt, Germany. They won silver medal in all-around behind Spain and won an Olympic quota for the 2028 Olympic Games. They took 7th place in 5 balls and 4th place in 3 hoops + 4 clubs final.
