= Kaseno Tanabe =

Japanese Rhythmic Gymnast

- 田邊観世埜
- Born: 18 July 2006 (age 20) Tokyo, Japan
- Height: 165 cm (5 ft 5 in)

Gymnastics career
- Discipline: Rhythmic Gymnastics
- Country represented: Japan; (2025–present)
- Club: Setagaya RG
- Head coaches: Rika Yamamoto, Yukari Murata
Medal record
Group rhythmic gymnastics
Representing Japan
World Championships
Silver medal – second place	2026 Frankfurt	Group All-Around
Asian Games
Silver medal – second place	2026 Aichi-Nagoya	Group All-around

Kaseno Tanabe (Japanese: 田邊観世埜; born 18 July 2006) is a Japanese rhythmic gymnast. She represents Japan internationally as a member of the national group.

== Career ==
In October 2025, Tanabe was selected to join the national senior group. She made her debut as a starter in June, at the World Challenge Cup in Beijing, being 6th in the All-Around, 5th with 5 balls and 10th with 3 hoops & 4 clubs. In July, they ended on 5th place in all-around and 8th place in 3 hoops + 4 clubs final at the World Cup in Milan. In August, she was selected to represent Japan alongside Rin Manabe, Megumi Nishimoto, Hisano Taguchi, Yuna Tanaka and Natsumi Hanamura at the 2026 World Championships in Frankfurt, being 7th with 5 balls, 4th with 3 hoops & 4 clubs, 12th in teams and winning silver in the All-Around, thus earning a quota for the 2028 Olympics. In October the group won silver in the All-Around, behind the group from China, at the Asian Games in Aichi-Nagoya.
