= Lola Djuraeva =

Uzbekistani rhythmic gymnast (born 2009)

- Lola Joʻrayeva
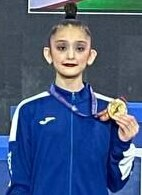
- Djuraeva at the 2023 Junior Asian Championships

Personal information
- Born: 5 July 2009 (age 17) Tashkent, Uzbekistan

Gymnastics career
- Discipline: Rhythmic gymnastics
- Country represented: Uzbekistan; (2023-present)
- Head coach: Inara Sattarova
Medal record
Representing Uzbekistan
Rhythmic gymnastics
Event	1st	2nd	3rd
FIG World Cup	0	0	2
Grand Prix	0	0	3
Total	0	0	5
Grand Prix
Bronze medal – third place	2026 Brno	Hoop
Bronze medal – third place	2026 Brno	Clubs
Bronze medal – third place	2026 Brno	Ribbon
European Cup
Silver medal – second place	2025 Baku	Ball
Silver medal – second place	2025 Baku	Cross battle
Junior Asian Championships
Gold medal – first place	2024 Tashkent	Ball
Gold medal – first place	2023 Manila	Team
Gold medal – first place	2023 Manila	Clubs
- Last updated on: 12 April 2026.

Lola Djuraeva (Uzbek: Lola Joʻrayeva; born 5 July 2009) is an Uzbek rhythmic gymnast. She won two silver medals at the 2025 European Cup. At the junior level, she won three gold medals at the Asian Championships.

== Gymnastics career ==
In 2018, Djuraeva was the national runner-up in the all-around among the girls born in 2009. She won a silver medal at the 2018 Navruz Cup held in Kazakhstan.

=== Junior ===
In 2023, Djuraeva competed at the Asian Championships in Manila, where she won a gold medal in the team event. She also won the gold medal in the clubs final by nearly two points ahead of Aiym Meirzhanova. She also competed at the 2023 Junior World Championships in Cluj-Napoca, where she finished sixth with the team and seventh in the clubs final.

In April 2024, Djuraeva won a silver medal in the ball final at the Bosphorus Cup in Istanbul. Later that year, she was selected to compete at the Asian Championships in her native Tashkent, where she won a gold medal in the ball final.

=== Senior ===
Djuraeva became age-eligible for senior competitions in 2025. She made her senior international debut at the World Cup in Baku, where she finished in 14th place in the all-around and did not advance into any apparatus finals. She then competed at the 2025 European Cup, also in Baku, and won a silver medal in the cross battle event behind Italy's Sofia Raffaeli. She also won the silver medal in the ball final behind Raffaeli and placed seventh in the ribbon final. She competed at the Strongest Cup held in Sirius, Russia, and she won bronze medals in the hoop and ribbon finals. She also finished fifth in the ball final and fourth in the clubs final. On July 18-20, she competed at World Cup Milan and took 26th place in all-around.

In 2026, Lola started her season competing at Sofia World Cup, where she took 8th place in all-around. She qualified to her first World Cup apparatus final (with ball), finishing on 6th place. Next, she competed at Tashkent World Cup, taking 6th place in all-around. She won bronze medals in ball and clubs finals. On 17-19 April, she was 9th in the all-around at the Baku World Cup and did not qualify to any apparatus finals.

== Routine music information ==
Year	Apparatus	Music Title
2026	Hoop	Dance of the Knights (No Choir)-17565 by Imagine Music
2026	Ball	Eleanor Rigby by Palaye Royale
2026	Clubs	Start The Party by Darco, Asaf Samuel
2026	Ribbon 1	Lift Me Up (from Black Panther) by Rihanna, Great Spirit by Armin van Buuren, Vini Vici (Remix)
2026	Ribbon 2	Jimmy, Renda-Se by Tom zé
2025	Hoop	Dance of the Knights (No Choir)-17565 by Imagine Music
2025	Ball	Hawse by OsMan
2025	Clubs	Welcome to the Moulin Rouge by Original Broadway Cast of Moulin Rouge! The Musical
2025	Ribbon	Lift Me Up (from Black Panther) by Rihanna, Great Spirit by Armin van Buuren, Vini Vici (Remix)
2023	Hoop	
2023	Ball	
2023	Clubs	Backstage Romance by Ricky Rojas, Robyn Hurder, Original Broadway Cast of Moulin Rouge! The Musical
2023	Ribbon	
