= Rukhshona Dekhkonova =

Uzbekistani rhythmic gymnast

- Born: 6 February 2007 (age 19) Bukhara, Uzbekistan

Gymnastics career
- Discipline: Rhythmic gymnastics
- Country represented: Uzbekistan; (2023-present)
- Head coach: Rano Mukhamedova
- Assistant coach: Luiza Ganieva
- Choreographer: Maria Akhrarova
Medal record
Rhythmic gymnastics
Representing Uzbekistan
Asian Championships
Gold medal – first place	2023 Manila	Team
Silver medal – second place	2023 Manila	Group All-Around
Silver medal – second place	2023 Manila	3 Ribbons + 2 Balls

Rukhshona Dekhkonova (born 6 February 2007) is an Uzbek rhythmic gymnast. She is a multiple Asian medalist.

== Personal life ==
Rukhshona took up the sport in 2013, she has received the title of Candidate for Master of Sport in Uzbekistan.

== Career ==
She entered the senior group in 2023, competing at the Asian Championships in Manila where she won gold in teams and silver in the All-Around and with 3 ribbon & 2 balls. At the World Championships in Valencia Uzbekistan was 10th in teams, the group ended 15th in the All-Around.
