= Megumi Nishimoto =

Japanese rhythmic gymnast

- Born: 26 September 2007 (age 19) Hiroshima, Japan
- Height: 162.4 cm (5 ft 4 in)

Gymnastics career
- Discipline: Rhythmic gymnastics
- Country represented: Japan; (2023–present)
- Club: Showa Gakuin Senior High School
- Head coach: Yukari Murata
Medal record
Group rhythmic gymnastics
Representing Japan
Event	1st	2nd	3rd
World Championships	1	2	0
World Cup	3	4	2
Total	4	6	2
World Championships
Gold medal – first place	2025 Rio de Janeiro	Group All-Around
Silver medal – second place	2025 Rio de Janeiro	5 Ribbons
Silver medal – second place	2026 Frankfurt	Group All-Around
Asian Games
Silver medal – second place	2026 Aichi-Nagoya	Group All-around
Asian Championships
Silver medal – second place	2023 Manila	Group All-around
Silver medal – second place	2023 Manila	5 Hoops

Megumi Nishimoto (西本愛実, Nishimoto Megumi; born 26 September 2007) is a Japanese group rhythmic gymnast. She is the 2025 World group all-around champion and the 2026 World group all-around silver medalist.

== Career ==
Megumi took up the sport at age seven.

=== 2023 ===
In 2023 the Japanese group debuted at the World Cup in Athens, being 9th in the All-Around and did not qualify for finals. In Sofia she was 8th overall, 4th with 5 hoops, and 10th with 3 ribbons & 2 balls. In Baku they finished 9th in the All-Around, 12th with 5 hoops and 8th in the mixed event. In Portimão the group was 6th in the All-Around and with 5 hoops, and won bronze with 3 ribbons & 2 balls. Competing at the Asian Championships she won bronze in the All-Around and silver with 5 hoops. In the World Cup in Cluj-Napoca Japan was 14th overall, 16th with 5 hoops and 12th with 3 ribbons & 2 balls. In August she was selected, along Rina Imaoka, Chihana Nakamura, Ayuka Suzuki, Rinako Inaki and Hisano Taguchi, for the World Championships in Valencia, being 13th in the All-Around and with 5 hoops, 6th with 3 ribbons & 2 balls.

=== 2024 ===
Suzuki helped Japan win the gold medals in both the 5 hoops and 3 ribbons and 2 balls finals at the 2024 Baku World Cup. At the 2024 Asian Championships, they finished second in the all-around to Uzbekistan and missed the continental Olympic berth. They won the gold medal in the 5 hoops final and finished second to Uzbekistan again in the 3 ribbons and 2 balls final.

=== 2025 ===
In 2025, she competed as a part of a renewed group and won silver medal in all-around at Sofia World Cup. They also won silver medal in 5 ribbons and bronze in 3 balls + 2 hoops finals. In July, they bronze in 5 ribbons and silver medals in all-around and 3 balls + 2 hoops at Milan World Cup. Next week, they competed at Cluj-Napoca World Challenge Cup, where they took 4th place in all-around and 7th place in 5 ribbons final. In late August, she was selected to represent Japan alongside Natsumi Hanamura, Hatsune Miyoshi, Ayuka Suzuki, Rinako Inaki and Hisano Taguchi at the 2025 World Championships in Rio de Janeiro, Brazil. They won gold medal in group all-around, 0.3 point in front of Brazil, being the first World all-around champions from Asia. They also won silver medal in 5 ribbons final and took 5th place in 3 balls + 2 hoops final.

=== 2026 ===
In 2026, Nishimoto remained in the group after teammates Ayuka Suzuki and Rinako Inaki retiring. She and her group took 6th place in all-around and 5th in 3 hoops + 4 clubs final at the Sofia World Cup. They took another 6th place in all-around at the Tashkent World Cup and 4th place in 5 balls final. They were 9th in all-around at Baku World Cup. In June, they took 6th place in all-around at Beijing World Challenge Cup. In July, they ended on 5th place in all-around and 8th place in 3 hoops + 4 clubs final at Milan World Cup.

In August, she was selected to represent Japan alongside Rin Manabe, Natsumi Hanamura, Hisano Taguchi, Kaseno Tanabe and Yuna Tanaka at the 2026 World Championships in Frankfurt, Germany. They won silver medal in group all-around event, which earned them a quota for the 2028 Olympic Games. In apparatus finals, they took 4th place in 3 hoops + 4 clubs and 7th place in 5 balls.
