= Takhmina Ikromova =

Uzbekistani rhythmic gymnast (born 2004)

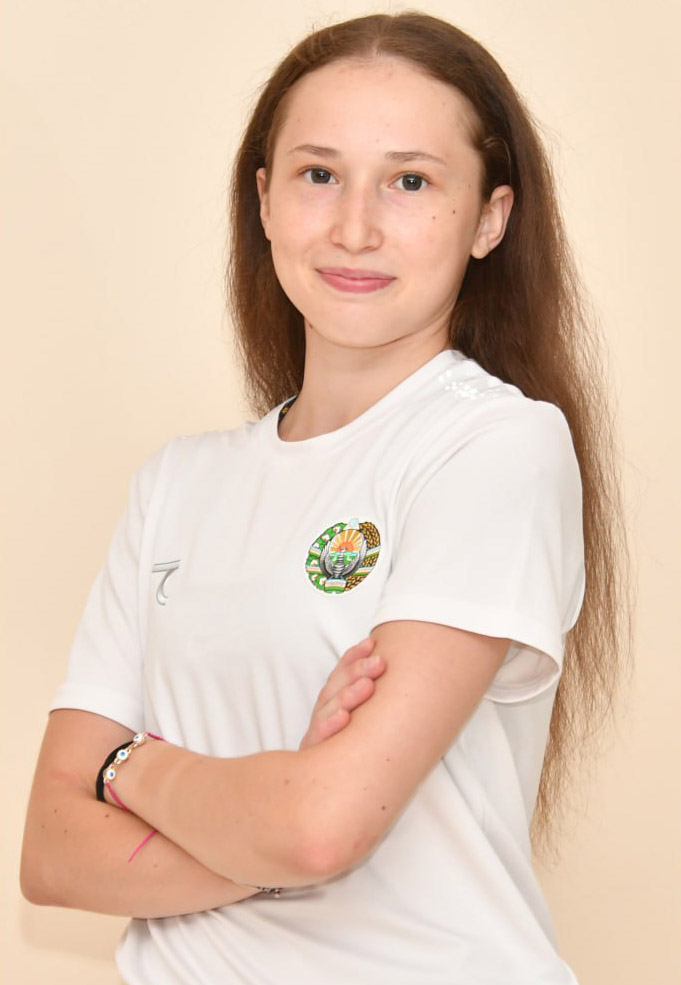
- Ikromova in 2023

Personal information
- Full name: Takhmina Ikromova
- Born: 6 August 2004 (age 22) Samarkand, Uzbekistan
- Height: 167 cm (5 ft 6 in)

Gymnastics career
- Discipline: Rhythmic gymnastics
- Country represented: Uzbekistan; (2017-)
- Head coach: Liliya Vlasova
- Assistant coach: Elena Aslanova
- World ranking: 5 (2026 Season ) 5 (2025 Season )
Medal record
Rhythmic gymnastics
Representing Uzbekistan
Event	1st	2nd	3rd
Asian Games	3	0	0
Asian Championships	24	6	1
World University Games	2	2	0
World Cup	10	10	14
Islamic Solidarity Games	1	4	0
Total	40	22	15
Asian Games
Gold medal – first place	2022 Hangzhou	All-Around
Gold medal – first place	2022 Hangzhou	Team
Gold medal – first place	2026 Aichi-Nagoya	All-Around
Asian Championships
Gold medal – first place	2021 Tashkent	Hoop
Gold medal – first place	2022 Pattaya	All-Around
Gold medal – first place	2022 Pattaya	Hoop
Gold medal – first place	2022 Pattaya	Ball
Gold medal – first place	2022 Pattaya	Clubs
Gold medal – first place	2022 Pattaya	Team
Gold medal – first place	2023 Manila	All-Around
Gold medal – first place	2023 Manila	Hoop
Gold medal – first place	2023 Manila	Ball
Gold medal – first place	2023 Manila	Clubs
Gold medal – first place	2023 Manila	Team
Gold medal – first place	2024 Tashkent	Ball
Gold medal – first place	2024 Tashkent	Clubs
Gold medal – first place	2024 Tashkent	Team
Gold medal – first place	2025 Singapore	All-Around
Gold medal – first place	2025 Singapore	Hoop
Gold medal – first place	2025 Singapore	Clubs
Gold medal – first place	2025 Singapore	Team
Gold medal – first place	2026 Bishkek	Team
Gold medal – first place	2026 Bishkek	All-around
Gold medal – first place	2026 Bishkek	Hoop
Gold medal – first place	2026 Bishkek	Ball
Gold medal – first place	2026 Bishkek	Clubs
Gold medal – first place	2026 Bishkek	Ribbon
Silver medal – second place	2021 Tashkent	All-around
Silver medal – second place	2021 Tashkent	Clubs
Silver medal – second place	2021 Tashkent	Ribbon
Silver medal – second place	2022 Pattaya	Ribbon
Silver medal – second place	2024 Tashkent	All-around
Silver medal – second place	2024 Tashkent	Ribbon
Bronze medal – third place	2025 Singapore	Ball
World University Games
Gold medal – first place	2025 Rhine-Rhur	Hoop
Gold medal – first place	2025 Rhine-Rhur	Ribbon
Silver medal – second place	2025 Rhine-Rhur	All-around
Silver medal – second place	2025 Rhine-Rhur	Clubs
Islamic Solidarity Games
Gold medal – first place	2021 Konya	Hoop
Silver medal – second place	2021 Konya	Team
Silver medal – second place	2021 Konya	Ball
Silver medal – second place	2021 Konya	Clubs
Silver medal – second place	2021 Konya	Ribbon
- Last updated on: 3 October 2026.

Takhmina Ikromova (born 6 August 2004) is an Uzbekistani rhythmic gymnast. She is a two-time (2022, 2026) Asian Games all-around gold medalist, a four-time (2022, 2023, 2025, 2026) Asian all-around champion and the 2025 World University Games all-around silver medalist.

She competed at the 2024 Summer Olympics in the rhythmic individual all-around, where she came in 14th place at the qualifications.

== Career ==
Ikromova began rhythmic gymnastics when she was five after being brought to the gym by her mother. She won several international competitions for young gymnasts.

=== Junior ===
She was part of the junior national team that competed at the 2019 Asian Junior Championships in Pattaya, Thailand. They won the silver medal in the team competition, and Ikromova won the gold medal in the ribbon final. She also represented Uzbekistan at the 2019 Junior World Championships in Moscow, Russia and finished in 11th place in the team competition. Individually, she placed 10th in both the rope and ribbon in the qualification round.

=== Senior ===
==== 2021 ====
At the 2021 Asian Rhythmic Gymnastics Championships held in Tashkent, Uzbekistan, she won the silver medals in the all-around, clubs and ribbon finals and a gold medal in the hoop final. At the 2021 World Championships in Kitakyushu, Japan she placed 29th in the all-around qualification.

==== 2022 ====
In 2022, she competed at World Cup Tashkent and won a gold medal in the all-around in front of Ekaterina Vedeneeva from Slovenia and Darja Varfolomeev from Germany. She also took gold medals in the hoop and clubs finals, a bronze medal in the ribbon final, and finished 4th place in the ball final.

She competed at the Islamic Solidarity Games. In the team event, she won the silver medal along with her teammates Yosmina Rakhimova and Sabina Tashkenbaeva. She also won three individual silver medals, in the ball, clubs, and ribbon finals, and the gold medal in the hoop final.

At the 2022 World Championships, she qualified to the all-around final in eleventh place. She qualified for the clubs final with the fifth-highest score with that apparatus; it was the first time in more than a decade that an Uzbekistani rhythmic gymnast had qualified to an apparatus final at the World Championships. She was again 11th place in the all-around final and just out of the medals in 4th place in the clubs final.

In October, she competed at the 2022 Asian Games in Hangzhou, China. She won the gold medal in the individual all-around final and in the team competition alongside Vilana Savadyan and Evelina Atalyants.

==== 2023 ====
In 2023, she started the competition season at Athens World Cup, where she finished 4th in the all-around and won a silver medal in the clubs final. She took part in Sofia World Cup, where she won bronze in the all-around. She qualified for three apparatus finals, winning gold in ribbon and bronze in ball final. On April 14–16, she competed at Tashkent World Cup, winning the silver medal in the all-around, behind Italian Sofia Raffaeli. She qualified to all apparatus finals, but only won a medal in the hoop final (bronze). She finished 4th in the all-around at Baku World Cup and won bronze medals in the ball and ribbon finals. At the 2023 Asian Championships, she won gold in the all-around, team event, and three of the apparatus finals (hoop, ball, and clubs).

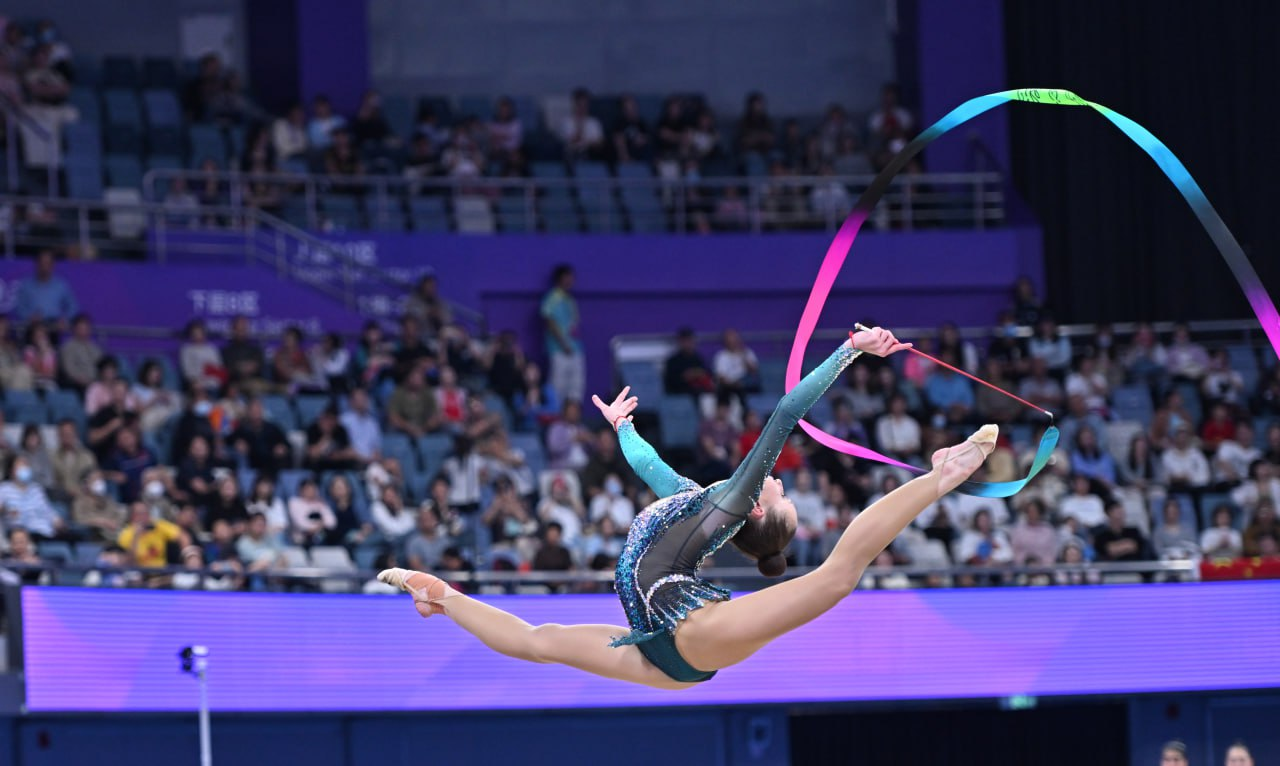
Ikromova performs a split leap during her ribbon routine at the 2022 Asian Games

She competed at the 2023 World Championships, where she finished in 5th place in the all-around final and qualified to two apparatus finals; she was 4th with the clubs and 8th with the ribbon. This was a qualifying event for the 2024 Summer Olympics, and her placement gave Uzbekistan a berth in the individual event at the Olympics, which was allotted to Ikromova.

In October, she competed at the Asian Games in Hangzhou, China. She won gold in the team event with her teammates Vilana Savadyan and Evelina Atalyants, and she also won gold in the individual event. At the end of 2023, she was given an award for the best female Uzbekistani athlete of the year. She was featured on a commemorative postage stamps due to her two gold medals at the Asian Games.

==== 2024 ====
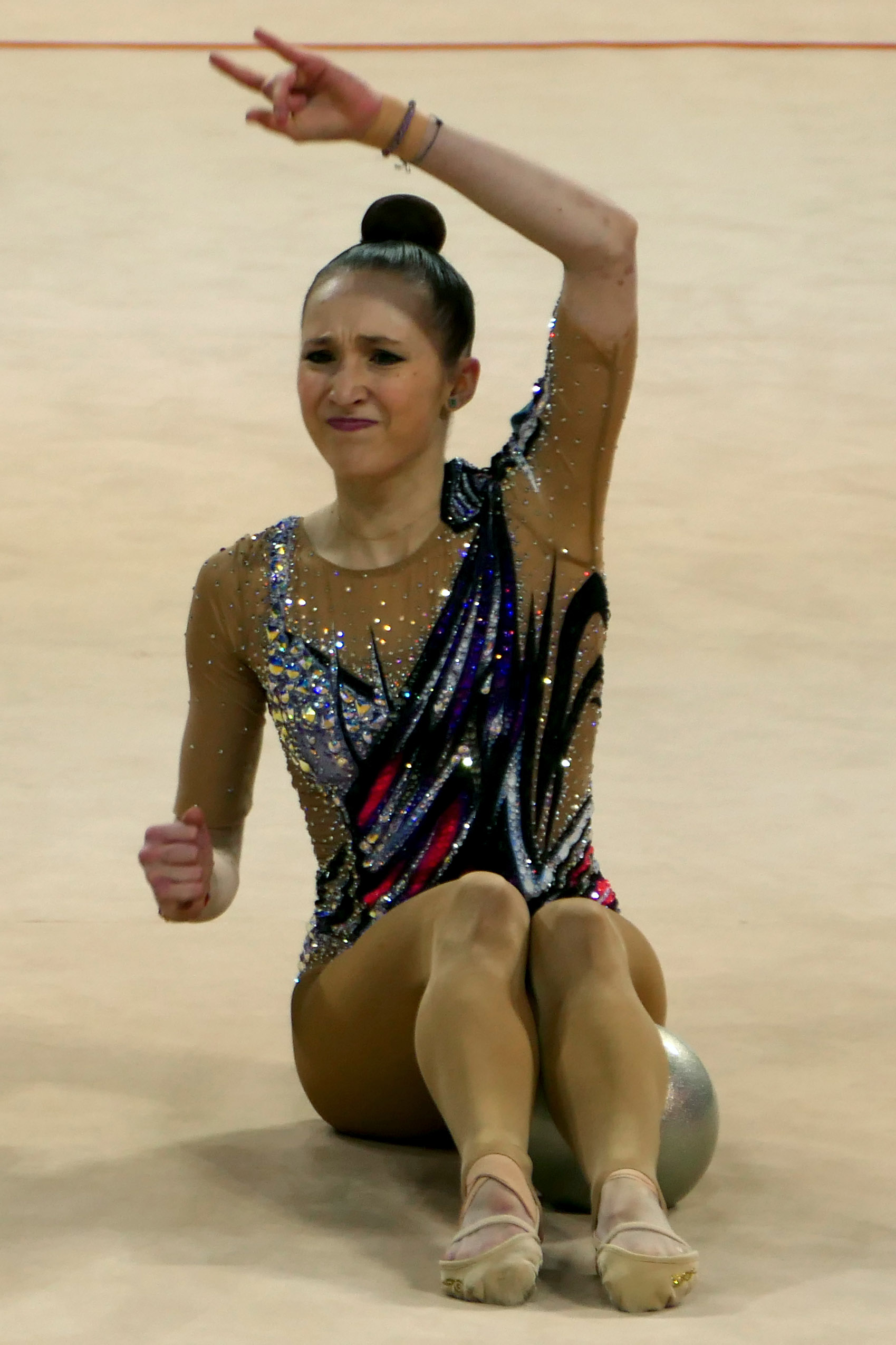
Ikromova reacting to her ball final routine at the 2024 Sofia World Cup

Ikromova began her 2024 season by competing at the Grand Prix event in Marbella, Spain. She finished second in the all-around, behind Stiliana Nikolova and ahead of Darja Varfolomeev, and she also won silver with the clubs and the ball. At the next Grand Prix event in Thiais, she won the all-around gold medal.

She competed at her first World Cup of the season in Sofia. There she was sixth in the all-around and won a silver in the ball final. At her next World Cup in Tashkent, Ikromova won the all-around silver medal behind Varfolomeev and ahead of Boryana Kaleyn. She won two of the four event finals (hoop and ball) and won silver in the other two (clubs and ribbon).

At the 2024 Asian Championships in Tashkent, Ikromova was silver in the all-around behind Elzhana Taniyeva. Along with the other Uzbekistani gymnasts, she won gold in the team event. She won two gold medals (ball, clubs) and an additional silver (ribbon) in the apparatus finals.

Ikromova competed at the World Cup in Milan in June. She came in 8th place in the all-around and qualified for three apparatus finals. In the ball final, she won bronze.

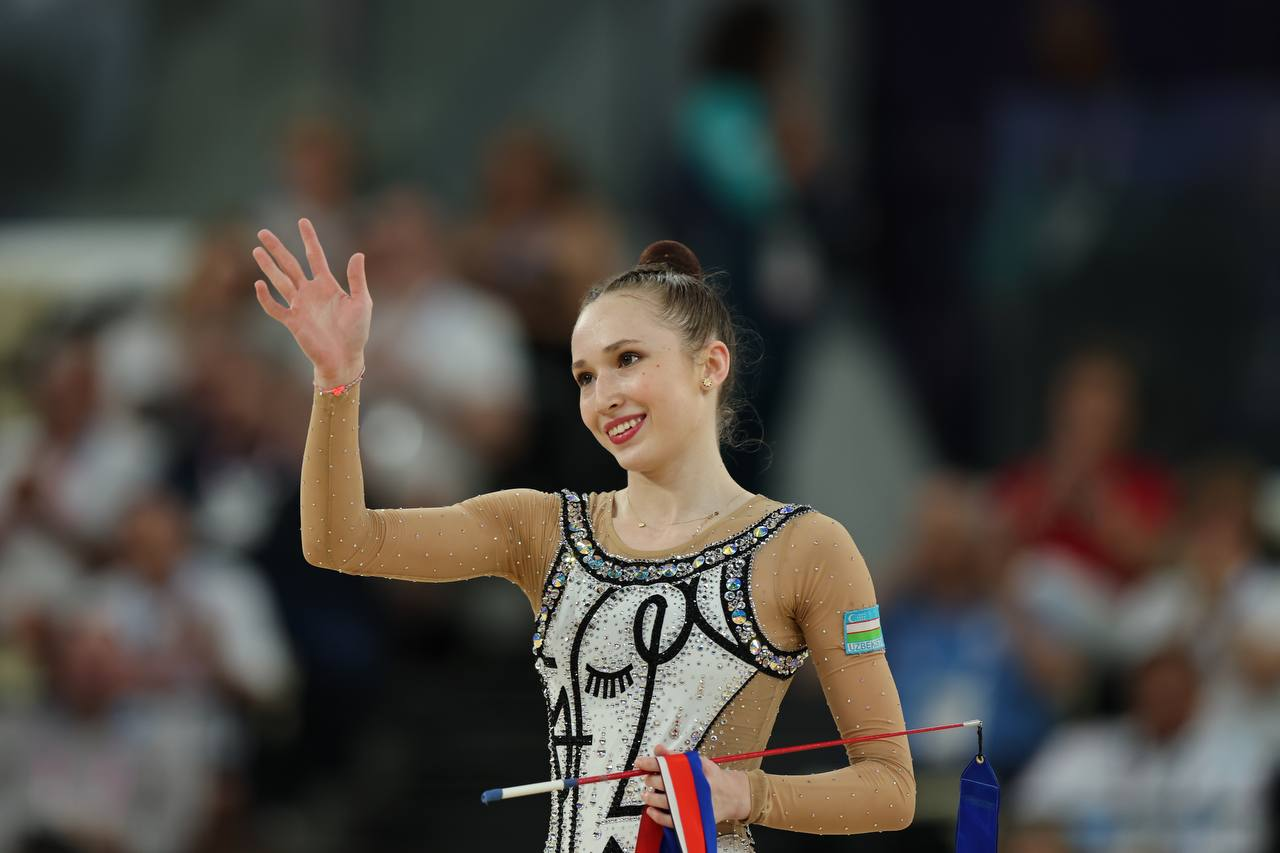
Ikromova waving to the audience after her ribbon routine at the 2024 Summer Olympics

In August, Ikromova competed at the 2024 Summer Olympics. In the qualification round, she made mistakes in her hoop and clubs routines. She ended the qualification round in 14th place and did not advance to the final.

==== 2025 ====
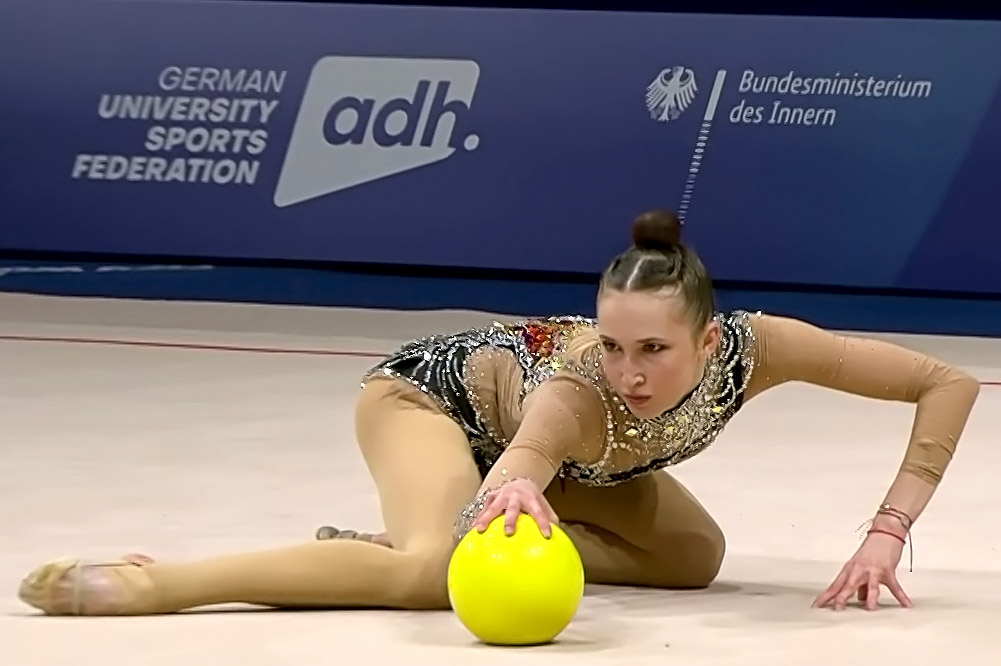
Ikromova performing with the ball at the 2025 Summer World University Games

Ikromova began her season in late February by competing for Italian club Ginnastica Ritmica Albachiara during the first stage of the Italian Serie A2 club championship, where the team won the gold medal. At the Grand Prix Mabella in late Mach, she won the bronze medal in the all-around behind Taisiia Onofriichuk and Sofia Raffaeli. She also won the silver medal in ball and finished 4th in the hoop final.

In April, she competed at World Cup Sofia and won the bronze medal in the all-around. She won another bronze medal in the ball final and a silver medal in clubs. On 25-27 April, she competed at World Cup Tashkent, where she won the gold medal in the all-around ahead of Darja Varfolomeev and Liliana Lewinska. She won the gold medal in hoop, silver medals in the ball and ribbon finals and a bronze in clubs. In May, she became the 2025 Asian all-around champion. She also won gold in team, hoop and clubs and bronze in ball.

On 17-19 July she won the all-around silver medal at the 2025 Summer Universiade in Essen. In the apparatus finals, she took gold in hoop and ribbon and silver in ball. Ikromova was selected to represent Uzbekistan alongside Anastasiya Sarantseva at the 2025 World Championships in Rio de Janeiro, Brazil. She took 5th place in the all-around final, equaling her result from the 2023 Worlds. She qualified to two apparatus finals, finishing 4th in ball and 8th in clubs.

==== 2026 ====
Ikromova started the season competing at Grand Prix Mabella in late March, where she won the silver medal in the all-around behind Taisiia Onofriichuk. She also won silver in hoop, bronze in ball and gold in clubs finals. In April, she won the bronze medal in the all-around at the Tashkent World Cup. She also won gold medals in hoop and ball and the silver medal in the clubs final. The next weekend, she competed at the Baku World Cup and took 4th place in the all-around. In the end of May, she competed at the 2026 Asian Championships in Bishkek and won six out of six possible gold medals (all-around, team, all apparatus finals).

In June, Takhmina took the bronze medal in the all-around behind Varfolomeev and Onofriichuk at the World Challenge Cup Cluj-Napoca. She qualified to all four apparatus finals, winning silver medal in ribbon and placing 4th with ball, 5th with hoop and 6th with clubs. In July, she competed at the World Cup Milan and ended in 6th place in the all-around. In August, she was selected to represent Uzbekistan at the 2026 World Championships in Frankfurt, Germany. She was 18th in the all-around qualifications and had a massive improvement in the all-around final, finishing in 13th place. Of the apparatus finals, she qualified only in hoop, where she ended in 5th place (score 30.000).

In October, she competed at the 2026 Asian Games in Nagoya, Japan, and qualified to the all-around final from third place. She won the gold medal in the all-around final in front of Wang Qi and Wang Zilu by 2 points.

== Achievements ==
- First Uzbek rhythmic gymnast to win a gold medal in an individual apparatus final on the FIG World Cup series.
- First Uzbek rhythmic gymnast to win a medal in an individual all-around on the FIG World Cup series.
- First Uzbek rhythmic gymnast to win a gold medal in an individual all-around on the FIG World Cup series.

== Routine music information ==
Year	Apparatus	Music Title
2026	Hoop	Spectre by Power-Haus
2026	Ball	Killer Game / Fire Starter by FreshmanSound / Sons of Legion
2026	Clubs	Ratata / Alibi by Victoria / Curtis Cole and Sevdaliza, Pabllo Vittar & Yseult
2026	Ribbon	Run It's A Gun / It's Got My Name On It by Power-Haus / Tommee Profitt
2025	Hoop	Spectre by Power-Haus
2025	Ball	Run Londinium / Gorilla / Candyall Beat (Remix By Mr. Bill & Mr. Ben) by Daniel Pemberton, Lord KraVen, Carlinhos Brown, Timbalada & Os Zárabe
2025	Clubs	Ratata / Alibi by Victoria / Curtis Cole and Sevdaliza, Pabllo Vittar & Yseult
2025	Ribbon	Jeszcze Raz Vabank von Anna Dereszowska & Machina Del Tango
2024	Hoop	Get out of Here by Charlie Ryan
2024	Ball	Bad Guy by KONG.
2024	Clubs	Carmen by Arcadian
2024	Ribbon	À nos folies by Léa Paci
2023	Hoop	"Main Title" from The Queen's Gambit, "Piano by Candlelight", "Prodigy" by Carlos Rafael Rivera, Carl Doy, Kōtarō Nakagawa
2023	Ball	La salvaora by Concha Buika and Jacob Sureda
2023	Clubs	Carmen by Arcadian
2023	Ribbon	Dangerous Affairs by Inon Zur
2022	Hoop	Hero With A Red Mask by Rok Nardin
2022	Ball (first)	Seven Nation Army by Postmodern Jukebox
2022	Ball (second)	Iron, Badabum Cha Cha, Dancina, Day N Night by Woodkid, Marracash, Yemi Alade, Aiyo
2022	Clubs	Palladio 'a cappella' cover by SeiOttavi
2022	Ribbon	Legendary by Welshly Arms
2021	Hoop	End Credits from Coraline by Bruno Coulais
2021	Ball	Carmen's Story by Edith Piaf
2021	Clubs	Sloppy Soup Samba by Daniel Pemberton
2021	Ribbon	Pogonya by Yan Frenkel
2020	Hoop	Grand Guignol by Bajofondo
2020	Ball	The Swing Phenomenon (Radio Edit) by Back&Baker (feat. Nicolle Rochette)
2020	Clubs	Party Rockers by Gordon Goodwin's Big Phat Band
2020	Ribbon	
2019	Rope	Taka takata by Irakere
2019	Ball	
2019	Clubs	
2019	Ribbon	Mi Bombón (Extended Remix) / Circle of Life (District 78 Remix) by Caba and Lion King

== Competitive highlights ==
(Team competitions in seniors are held only at the World Championships, Europeans and other Continental Games.)

International: Senior
Year	Event	AA	Team	Hoop	Ball	Clubs	Ribbon
2026	Asian Games	1st					
2026	World Championships	13th		5th	22nd (Q)	17th (Q)	25th (Q)
2026	World Cup Milan	6th		3rd	8th	20th(Q)	3rd
2026	World Challenge Cup Cluj Napoca	3rd		5th	4th	6th	2nd
2026	Asian Championships Bishkek	1st	1st	1st	1st	1st	1st
2026	World Cup Baku	4th		7th	6th	8th	5th
2026	World Cup Tashkent	3rd		1st	1st	2nd	10th(Q)
2026	Grand Prix Marbella	2nd		2nd	3rd	1st	14th(Q)
2025	World Championships	5th	7th	9th(Q)	4th	8th	9th(Q)
2025	Summer Universiade	2nd		1st	4th	2nd	1st
2025	Asian Championships Singapore	1st	1st	1st	3rd	1st	5th
2025	World Cup Tashkent	1st		1st	2nd	3rd	2nd
2025	World Cup Sofia	3rd		6th	3rd	2nd	5th
2025	Grand Prix Marbella	3rd		4th	2nd	9th	9th(Q)
2024	Olympic Games	14th(Q)					
2024	World Cup Milan	8th		3rd	3rd	20th(Q)	6th
2024	Asian Championships Tashkent	2nd	1st	11th (Q)	1st	1st	2nd
2024	World Cup Tashkent	2nd		1st	1st	2nd	2nd
2024	World Cup Sofia	6th		6th	2nd	5th	13th (Q)
2024	Grand Prix Thiais	1st		7th	4th	8th	4th
2024	Grand Prix Marbella	2nd		10th (Q)	2nd	2nd	6th
2023
2023	Asian Games Hangzhou	1st	1st				
2023	World Championships Valencia	5th	10th	14th(Q)	50th(Q)	4th	8th
2023	World Cup Milan	7th		9th (Q)	8th	4th	14th (Q)
2023	Asian Championships Manila	1st	1st	1st	1st	1st	6th
2023	World Cup Baku	5th		20th (Q)	3rd	4th	3rd
2023	World Cup Tashkent	2nd		3rd	5th	6th	5th
2023	World Cup Sofia	3rd		4th	3rd	9th (Q)	1st
2023	World Cup Athens	4th		7th	5th	2nd	9th (Q)
2023	Gymnastik International Schmiden 2023	1st		1st	3rd	2nd	3rd
2022	World Championships Sofia	11th	7th	10th (Q)	19th (Q)	4th	11th (Q)
2022	Islamic Solidarity Games		2nd	1st	2nd	2nd	2nd
2022	Asian Championships Pattaya	1st	1st	1st	1st	1st	2nd
2022	World Cup Pesaro	4th		4th	6th	7th	10th (Q)
2022	World Cup Baku	11th		5th	10th(Q)	15th (Q)	17th (Q)
2022	World Cup Tashkent	1st		1st	4th	1st	3rd
2021	World Championships Kitakyushu	29th (Q)		27th (Q)	37th (Q)	26th (Q)	17th (Q)
2021	Asian Championships Tashkent	2nd		1st	5th	2nd	2nd
2021	World Cup Pesaro	29th		16th (Q)	41st (Q)	39th (Q)	19th (Q)
2021	World Cup Baku	37th		21st (Q)	36th (Q)	48th (Q)	31st (Q)
International: Junior
Year	Event	AA	Team	Hoop/Rope	Ball	Clubs	Ribbon
2019	Junior World Championships		11th	10th (Q)			10th (Q)
2019	Junior Asian Championships		2nd				1st
2018	Aeon Cup	5th	7th				
2017	Aeon Cup	2nd	3rd				
2017	Asian Championships Astana	2nd	1st	2nd	1st		1st
Q = Qualifications (Did not advance to Event Final due to the 2 gymnast per country rule, only Top 8 highest score); WR = World Record; WD = Withdrew; NT = No Team Competition; OC = Out of Competition(competed but scores not counted for qualifications/results)
