= Yuna Tanaka =

Japanese Rhythmic Gymnast

- 田中 結菜
- Born: 2009 (age 16–17) Hyogo, Japan

Gymnastics career
- Discipline: Rhythmic Gymnastics
- Country represented: Japan; (2023–present)
- Club: Takarazuka Sunny RG
- Head coaches: Rika Yamamoto, Yukari Murata
Medal record
Group rhythmic gymnastics
Representing Japan
World Championships
Silver medal – second place	2026 Frankfurt	Group All-Around
Asian Games
Silver medal – second place	2026 Aichi-Nagoya	Group All-around
Junior Asian Championships
Bronze medal – third place	2023 Manila	Group All-around
Bronze medal – third place	2023 Manila	Team
Bronze medal – third place	2023 Manila	5 Ropes
Bronze medal – third place	2023 Manila	5 Balls
Bronze medal – third place	2024 Tashkent	Group All-around
Bronze medal – third place	2024 Tashkent	10 Clubs
Bronze medal – third place	2024 Tashkent	5 Hoops

Yuna Tanaka (Japanese: 田中 結菜, born 2009) is a Japanese rhythmic gymnast. She represents Japan internationally as a member of the national group.

== Career ==
=== Junior ===
In 2023, Tanaka was part of the Japanese junior team along with Natsumi Hanamura, Julia Nishi, Rio Matsuda and Anon Mashima. From 31 May to 3 June the group took part in 2023 Asian Junior Championships in Manila, Philippines. They won bronze medals in group all-around, team competition, 5 ropes and 5 balls. Later that year, they competed at the 2023 Junior World Championships in Cluj-Napoca, Romania, and took 12th place in team all-around.

The group competed at the 2024 Asian Championships in Tashkent, Uzbekistan. They won bronze medals in all-around, 5 hoops and 10 clubs.

=== Senior ===
In 2026, Tanaka joined national senior group. She and her group took 6th place in all-around and 5th in 3 hoops + 4 clubs final at the Sofia World Cup. They took another 6th place in all-around at the Tashkent World Cup and 4th place in 5 balls final. They were 9th in all-around at Baku World Cup. In June, they took 6th place in all-around at Beijing World Challenge Cup. In July, they ended on 5th place in all-around and 8th place in 3 hoops + 4 clubs final at Milan World Cup.

In August, she was selected to represent Japan alongside Rin Manabe, Megumi Nishimoto, Hisano Taguchi, Kaseno Tanabe and Natsumi Hanamura at the 2026 World Championships in Frankfurt, Germany. They won silver medal in group all-around event, which earned them a quota for the 2028 Olympic Games. In apparatus finals, they took 4th place in 3 hoops + 4 clubs and 7th place in 5 balls.
