= Ayaulym Kadir =

Kazakh rhythmic gymnast

- Born: 25 April 2006 (age 20) Kazakhstan

Gymnastics career
- Discipline: Rhythmic gymnastics
- Country represented: Kazakhstan (2023-present)
- Head coaches: Inna Bystrova, Elvira Agliulina, Oksana Rozanova
Medal record
Rhythmic gymnastics
Representing Kazakhstan
Event	1st	2nd	3rd
Asian Championships	0	1	3
FIG World Cup	0	1	1
Total	0	2	4
Asian Championships
Silver medal – second place	2023 Manila	Team
Bronze medal – third place	2023 Manila	5 Hoops
Bronze medal – third place	2023 Manila	3 Ribbons + 2 Balls
Bronze medal – third place	2024 Tashkent	Group All-Around
Bronze medal – third place	2024 Tashkent	5 Hoops

Ayaulym Kadir (born 25 April 2006) is a Kazakh rhythmic gymnast, member of the national group.

== Career ==
Ayaulym became a starter in the group in 2023, winning silver with 5 hoops and bronze with 3 ribbons & 2 balls at the World Cup in Tashkent. Later she finished 12th in the All-Around, and 7th with 3 ribbons & 2 balls in Portimão. Competing at the Asian Championships in Manila she was 4th in the All-Around and won silver in teams along Aruzhan Kassenova, Aidana Shayakhmetova, Aruzhan Kalsayeva, Assel Shukirbay and individuals Elzhana Taniyeva, Aibota Yertaikyzy, Milana Parfilova, as well as bronze in both event finals. In July, the group placed 11th at the World Cup in Cluj-Napoca. Selected for the World Championships in Valencia she was 20th in the All-Around, 16th with 5 hoops and 23rd with 3 ribbons & 2 balls.
