= Mishel Nesterova =

Uzbekistani rhythmic gymnast

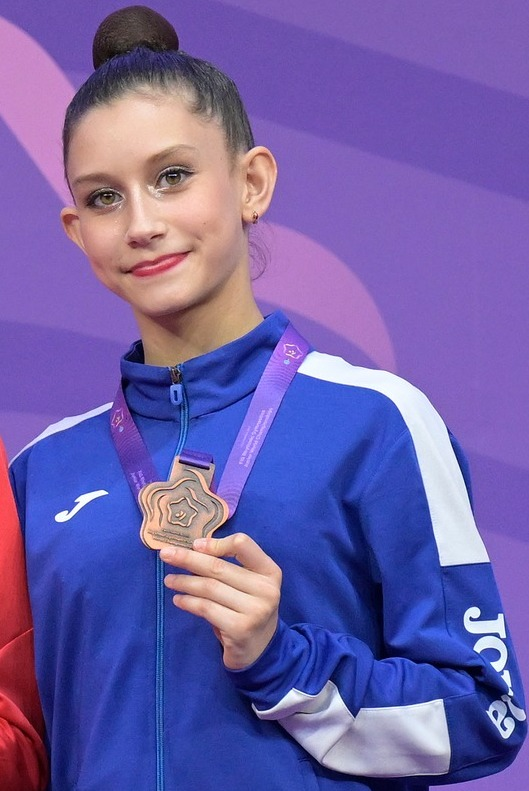

Personal information
- Born: 18 June 2009 (age 17) Tashkent, Uzbekistan

Gymnastics career
- Discipline: Rhythmic gymnastics
- Country represented: Uzbekistan (2023-present)
Medal record
Representing Uzbekistan
Rhythmic gymnastics
Event	1st	2nd	3rd
FIG World Cup	0	0	1
Total	0	0	1
Asian Championships
Gold medal – first place	2023 Manila	Team
Gold medal – first place	2023 Manila	Ribbon
Silver medal – second place	2024 Tashkent	Ribbon
Junior World Championships
Bronze medal – third place	2023 Cluj-Napoca	Ribbon

Mishel Nesterova (born 18 June 2009) is an Uzbekistani rhythmic gymnast who has competed both as an individual and group member. She is the 2023 Junior Asian champion with ribbon.

== Career ==
In 2018, aged 9, she won gold at the “Navruz Cup” in Kazakhstan.

=== Junior ===
As a junior, in 2023 she won team gold along Nataliya Usova at the AGF Trophy in Baku, she was also 4th with clubs. In May she won gold in teams and with ribbon at the Asian Championships in Manila. In July she competed at the Junior World Championships in Cluj-Napoca, winning an historical bronze with ribbon.

In 2024, she competed at the Bosphorus Cup where she won silver with ribbon. At the Junior Asian Championships in Tashkent She took silver medal in Ribbon final.

=== Senior ===
She became a senior in 2025 and competed in her first World Cup in Baku, where she finished in twenty-first place.

In 2026, she was included in the Uzbek national group. Debuting at the World Cup in Baku, she won bronze in the 5 balls final.
