= Jasmine Ramilo =

Filipino rhythmic gymnast (born 2008)

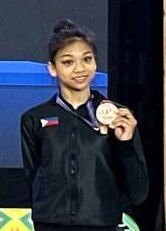
- Ramilo in 2023

Personal information
- Full name: Jasmine Althea Ramilo
- Born: 5 March 2008 (age 18) Rome, Italy

Gymnastics career
- Discipline: Rhythmic gymnastics
- Country represented: Philippines; (2023-)
- Club: Ginnastica Fabriano
- Head coach: Claudia Mancinelli
Medal record
Representing Philippines
Women's Rhythmic gymnastics
Asian Junior Championships
Bronze medal – third place	2023 Manila	Clubs
SEA Games
Gold medal – first place	2025 Thailand	All-around

Jasmine Althea Ramilo (born 6 March 2008) is a Filipino-Italian rhythmic gymnast who competes for the Philippines. She is the first gymnast from the Philippines to win a medal at the Asian Championships after she won a bronze with clubs at the 2023 Junior Asian Championships.

== Early life ==
Ramilo was born and raised in Rome. Her parents are both Filipino immigrants.

== Career ==
Ramilo trains in Marche, Italy.

=== Junior ===
In 2023, she made history by winning a bronze medal with clubs at the Junior Asian Championships in Manila, becoming the first Filipino gymnast to win a medal at that event.

=== Senior ===
She became a senior in 2024 and made her debut at the World Cup in Baku, where she placed 36th in the all-around, 25th with hoop, 30th with ball, 25th with clubs and 42nd with ribbon. At the Asian Championships in Tashkent, she took 13th place overall, 9th with hoop, 25th with ball, 13th with clubs and 22nd with ribbon. In June she participated in the World Cup in Milan, finishing 30th in the all-around, 25th with hoop, 33rd with ball, 38th with clubs and 26th with ribbon.

Ramilo began her 2025 season by competing at the International Rhythmic Gymnastics Tournament–Olympia 74 Cup in early February. There she won three medals, a gold and two bronzes. In April, she competed at the World Cup in Sofia, where she placed 46th in the all-around, and then at the next World Cup in Baku, where she finished 29th.

In May, she competed at the Asian Championships. She finished in 9th place in the all-around, making her the 2nd highest-placing gymnast representing a country from Southeast Asia at the championships. In late August, she was selected to represent Philippines as their only individual gymnast at the 2025 World Championships in Rio de Janeiro, Brazil. She came in 60th in all-around qualifications out of 97 gymnasts.

In December, she won the gold medal in all-around at the 2025 SEA Games in Thailand in front of Mikayla Angeline Yang despite the wrong music being played during her hoop routine.

In May 2026, she competed at the 2026 Asian Championships in Bishkek, and placed 13th in the all-around final.

== Achievements ==
- First rhythmic gymnast representing the Philippines to win a medal in an event final at the Asian Championships when she participated in the 2023 edition of the tournament in Manila, Philippines.

== Routine music information ==
Year	Apparatus	Music title
2025	Hoop	Les moulins de mon coeur by Juliette Armanet
2025	Ball	Quédate Luna by Natalia Doco and Mattend
2025	Clubs	Heartbreak Hotel, Blue Suede Shoes by Elvis Presley
2025	Ribbon	Crazy Rolling by Aaron Tveit and Karen Olivo from the Original Broadway Cast of Moulin Rouge! The Musical
2024	Hoop	Les moulins de mon coeur by Juliette Armanet
2024	Ball	Ki Te Mu by Faraualla
2024	Clubs	Haze by Power-Haus, Christian Reindl and Lucie Paradis
2024	Ribbon	Wannabe by Spice Girls
2023	Hoop	El Desierto by Lhasa
2023	Ball	Ki Te Mu by Faraualla
2023	Clubs	Come Together by Michael Jackson
2023	Ribbon	Drigo: Esmeralda: Pas de deux London Symphony Orchestra and Richard Bonynge
