= Vilana Savadyan =

Uzbek rhythmic gymnast

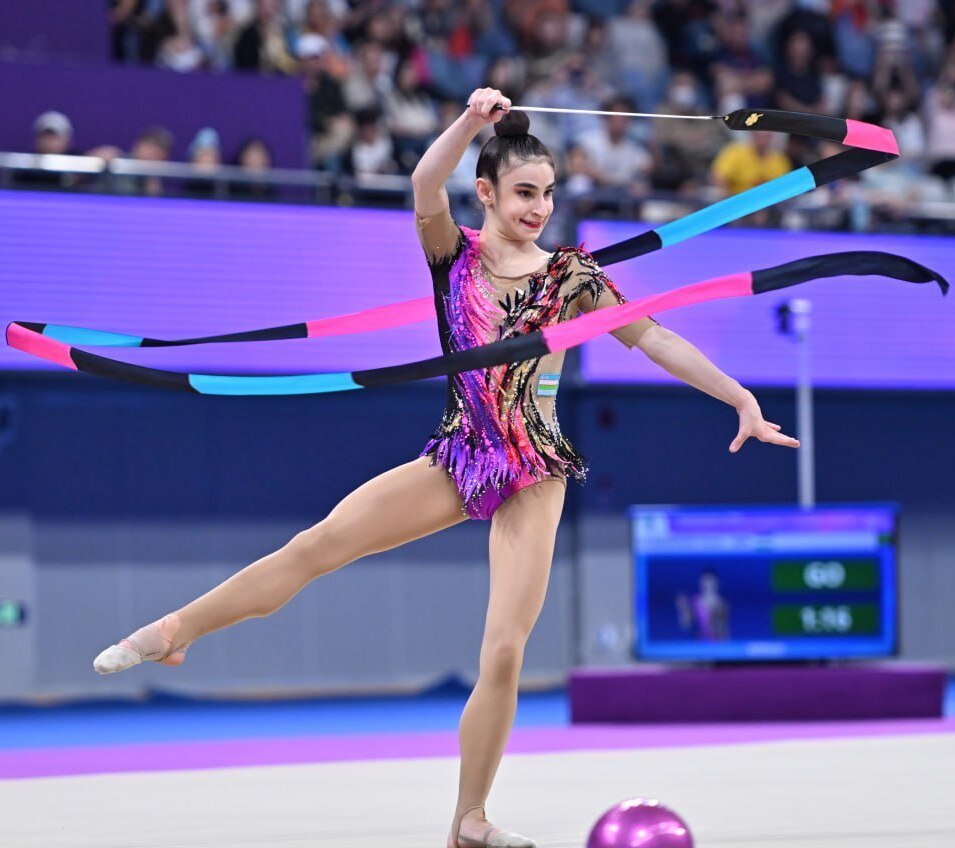

Personal information
- Born: 6 July 2007 (age 19) Uzbekistan

Gymnastics career
- Discipline: Rhythmic gymnastics
- Country represented: Uzbekistan; (2022-present)
- Head coach: Elena Aslanova
- Assistant coach: Maftuna Shamsieva
Medal record
Rhythmic gymnastics
Representing Uzbekistan
Asian Games
Gold medal – first place	2022 Hangzhou	Team
Asian Championships
Gold medal – first place	2022 Pattaya	Ribbon
Silver medal – second place	2022 Pattaya	Team

Vilana Savadyan (born 6 July 2007) is an Uzbek rhythmic gymnast. She is a multiple-time Asian junior medalist and also won the team gold at the Asian Games in 2022.

== Career ==
In 2018, she took part in the "Crystal Statuette Cup" in Moscow. In 2019 she was the national silver medalist with ribbon.

At the 2022 Asian Championships in Pattaya, she won silver in teams and became the junior champion with ribbon.

In 2023, she was selected for the 2022 Asian Games in Hangzhou where she, along with her teammates Evelina Atalyants and Takhmina Ikromova, won gold in the team event.
