= Breanna Labadan =

Filipina rhythmic gymnast (born 2006)

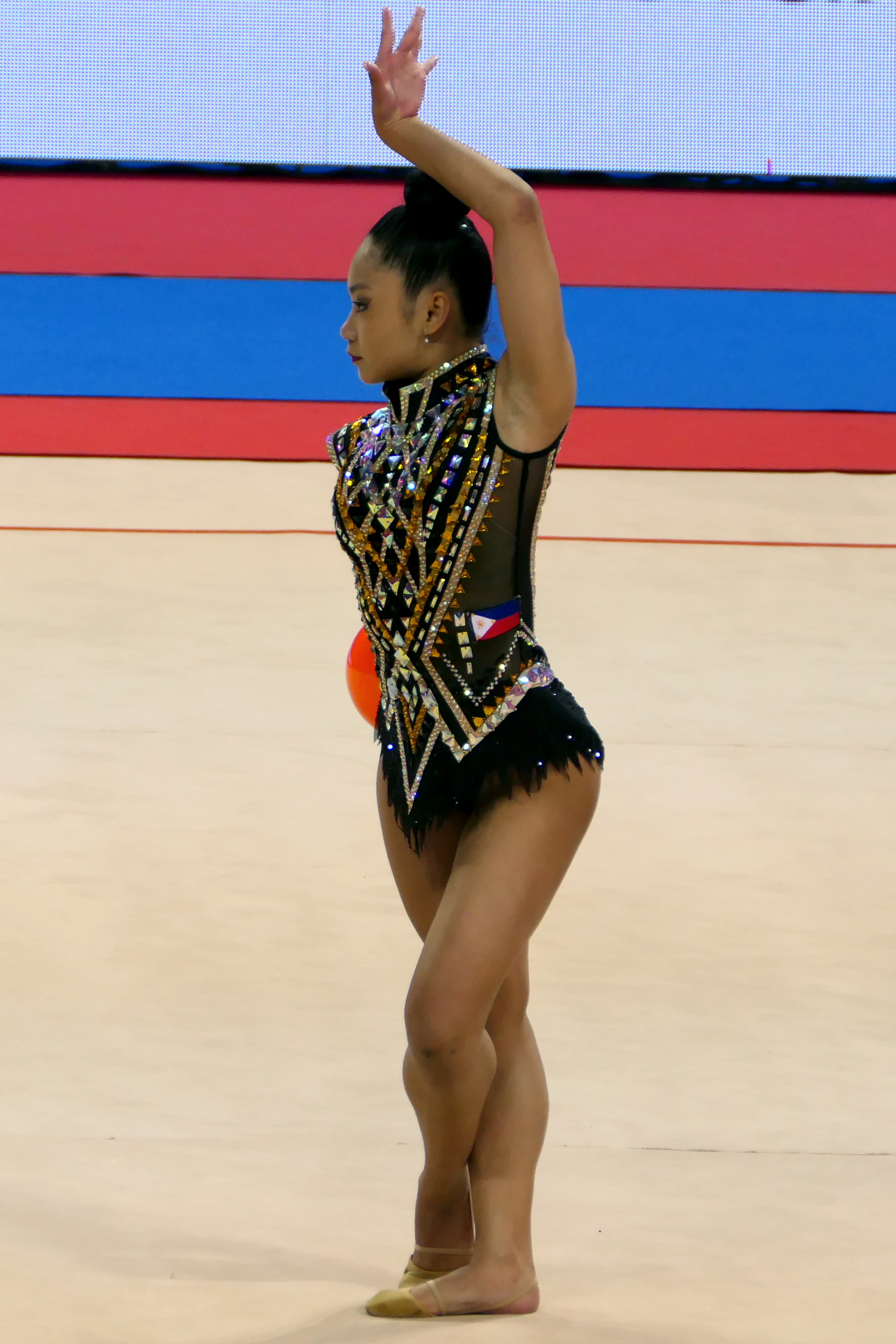
- Labadan in 2024
- Nickname: Bree
- Born: 13 July 2006 (age 20) Butuan, Philippines

Gymnastics career
- Discipline: Rhythmic gymnastics
- Country represented: Philippines; (2019-)
- Head coach: Dora Vass
Medal record
Representing Philippines
Women's Rhythmic gymnastics
Southeast Asian Games
Bronze medal – third place	2021 Vietnam	Individual all-around

Breanna Labadan (born 13 July 2006) is a Filipina rhythmic gymnast. She is the first gymnast from the Philippines to compete at the Rhythmic World Championships.

== Personal life ==
Her father, Arnold Labadan, led the Filipino rhythmic gymnastics delegation at the 2018 Vitrigo Cup International Competition in Kuala Lumpur. He has also served as chairman of the Gymnastics Association of the Philippines Athletes and Coaches Committee. Labadan took up gymnastics at age seven in Butuan after her parents enrolled her in a local club. In 2017, she began training with coach Dora Vass in Hungary, and she has also spent time competing on the European rhythmic gymnastics circuit.

== Career ==
=== Junior ===
In 2019, Labadan was the Filipina representative at the First Junior Rhythmic Gymnastics Championships in Moscow along with Jessica Rayne Tijam. She was 39th with ball and 48th with clubs.

=== Senior ===
In 2022, she made her senior international debut at the World Championships in Sofia. She was the first rhythmic gymnast from her country to attend the competition. She finished 66th in the all-around, 60th with hoop, 75th with ball, 76th with clubs and 59th with ribbon.

The following year, at the 2023 Asian Rhythmic Gymnastics Championships, she was 9th in the all-around and 8th with ball. She was selected for the World Championships along with Daniela Reggie Dela Pisa. There she ended 56th in the all-around, 48th with hoop, 60th with ball, 59th with clubs and 41st with ribbon. At the Asian Games, she finished 12th in the all-around.

In 2024, she competed at Sofia World Cup and took 48th place in all-around. She finished 10th in the all-around at the 2024 Asian Championships.

She competed at the 2025 Asian Championships in Singapore, finishing 20th in the all-around.

== Achievements ==
- First rhythmic gymnast representing the Philippines to compete at the World Championships when she participated in the 2022 edition of the tournament in Sofia, Bulgaria.
