= Dariya Kusherbayeva =

Kazakhstani rhythmic gymnast

- Born: 7 August 2009 (age 17) Kazakhstan

Gymnastics career
- Discipline: Rhythmic gymnastics
- Country represented: Kazakhstan (2023-present)
Medal record
Representing Kazakhstan
Rhythmic gymnastics
Asian Championships
Silver medal – second place	2023 Manila	Team
Silver medal – second place	2023 Manila	Hoop
Bronze medal – third place	2024 Tashkent	Hoop

Dariya Kusherbayeva (Kazakh: Дария Күшербаева; born 7 August 2009) is a Kazakh rhythmic gymnast. She is a multiple Asian Championship medallist.

== Career ==
=== Junior ===
In May 2023, Kusherbayeva competed at the Asian Championships in Manila, winning silver in teams and with hoop in the junior division. She was then selected to perform with hoop at the Junior World Championships in Cluj-Napoca, where she took 11th place with the apparatus and 9th in teams.

In 2024 she won bronze with hoop at the Asian Championships in Tashkent.

=== Senior ===
In 2025 she participated in Baku World Cup, and took 19th place in the All-Around. A month later in May, she participated in the World Challenge Cup in Portimão, placing 13 in the All-Around.
