= 2023 Asian Rhythmic Gymnastics Championships =

Gymnastics event in Manila, Philippines

2023 Asian Gymnastics Championships
- Venue: Ninoy Aquino Stadium
- Location: Manila, Philippines
- Start date: 31 May 2023
- End date: 3 June 2023

The 14th Rhythmic Gymnastics Asian Championships and the 19th Junior Asian Gymnastics Championships were held at the Ninoy Aquino Stadium in Manila, Philippines from May 31st to June 3, 2023.

== Participating countries ==
- Australia
- China
- Hong Kong
- India
- Indonesia
- Japan
- Kazakhstan

- Kyrgyzstan
- Laos
- Malaysia
- Mongolia
- New Zealand
- Philippines
- Singapore

- South Korea
- Sri Lanka
- Thailand
- Chinese Taipei
- Uzbekistan
- Vietnam

== Medal winners ==
=== Senior ===
Event	Gold	Silver	Bronze
All-around
Individual	(Uzbekistan) Takhmina Ikromova	(Kazakhstan) Elzhana Taniyeva	(China) Wang Zilu
Team	Uzbekistan; Senior Individual; Evelina Atalyants; Takhmina Ikromova; Yosmina Rakhimova; Senior Group; Shakhzoda Ibragimova; Ekaterina Fetisova; Rukhshona Dekhkonova; Mumtozabonu Iskhokzoda; Irodakhon Sadikova; Nargiza Djumaniyazova	Kazakhstan; Senior Individual; Elzhana Taniyeva; Aibota Yertaikyzy; Milana Parfilova; Senior Group; Ayaulym Kadir; Aruzhan Kassenova; Aidana Shayakhmetova; Aruzhan Kalsayeva; Assel Shukirbay	China; Senior Individual; Wang Zilu; Zhao Yating; Zhao Yue; Senior Group; Guo Qiqi; Hao Ting; Pu Yanzhu; Wang Lanjing; Huang Zhangjiayang; Ding Xinyi
Group	China; Guo Qiqi; Hao Ting; Pu Yanzhu; Wang Lanjing; Huang Zhangjiayang; Ding Xinyi	Uzbekistan; Shakhzoda Ibragimova; Ekaterina Fetisova; Rukhshona Dekhkonova; Mumtozabonu Iskhokzoda; Irodakhon Sadikova; Nargiza Djumaniyazova	Japan; Ayuka Suzuki; Nanami Takenaka; Chihana Nakamura; Hisano Taguchi; Rinako Inaki; Megumi Nishimoto
Individual
Hoop	(Uzbekistan) Takhmina Ikromova	(Kazakhstan) Elzhana Taniyeva	(China) Wang Zilu
Ball	(Uzbekistan) Takhmina Ikromova	(Uzbekistan) Evelina Atalyants	(Kazakhstan) Elzhana Taniyeva
Clubs	(Uzbekistan) Takhmina Ikromova	(Uzbekistan) Yosmina Rakhimova	(Kazakhstan) Elzhana Taniyeva
Ribbon	(China) Zhao Yating	(Kazakhstan) Elzhana Taniyeva	(Uzbekistan) Yosmina Rakhimova
Group
5 hoops	China	Japan	Kazakhstan
3 ribbons + 2 Balls	China	Uzbekistan	Kazakhstan

=== Junior ===
Event	Gold	Silver	Bronze
All-around
Team	Uzbekistan	Kazakhstan	Japan
Group	Uzbekistan; Adelya Fayzulina; Sabina Gadaeva; Diana Khakimova; Amaliya Mamedova; Yasmina Mkrtycheva; Guli Nasimboeva	Kazakhstan	Japan
Individual
Hoop	(Uzbekistan) Anastasiya Sarantseva	(Kazakhstan) Dariya Kusherbayeva	(Kyrgyzstan) Aleksandra Udodova
Ball	(Kazakhstan) Aiym Meirzhanova	(Uzbekistan) Nataliya Usova	(Japan) Yurisa Yamashita
Clubs	(Uzbekistan) Lola Djuraeva	(Kazakhstan) Aiym Meirzhanova	(Philippines) Jasmine Althea Ramilo
Ribbon	(Uzbekistan) Mishel Nesterova	(Kazakhstan) Aiym Meirzhanova	(South Korea) Kim Daeun
Group
5 ropes	Kazakhstan	Uzbekistan	Japan
5 balls	Kazakhstan	Uzbekistan	Japan

== Results ==
=== Senior ===
==== Individual All-Around ====
Rank	Gymnast	Nation	Hoop (rhythmic gymnastics)	Ball (rhythmic gymnastics)	Clubs (rhythmic gymnastics)	Ribbon (rhythmic gymnastics)	Total
1st place, gold medalist(s)	Takhmina Ikromova	Uzbekistan	34.000	33.750	32.950	31.500	132.200
2nd place, silver medalist(s)	Elzhana Taniyeva	Kazakhstan	32.750	33.400	31.000	31.200	128.350
3rd place, bronze medalist(s)	Wang Zilu	China	32.600	29.750	31.000	28.450	121.800
4	Yosmina Rakhimova	Uzbekistan	28.300	28.500	33.050	30.850	120.700
5	Aibota Yertaikyzy	Kazakhstan	29.950	28.050	30.150	30.550	118.700
6	Zhao Yating	China	30.200	30.750	28.300	29.250	118.500
7	Mirano Kita	Japan	30.100	29.400	27.450	25.450	112.400
8	Aino Yamada	Japan	28.700	28.350	28.150	27.100	112.300
9	Breanna Labadan	Philippines	26.100	29.550	28.300	26.450	110.400
10	Mikayla Angeline Yang	Singapore	26.450	27.100	26.600	25.600	105.750
11	Sohn Ji-in	South Korea	26.600	28.000	27.500	22.700	104.800
12	Ng Joe Ee	Malaysia	24.950	27.700	26.600	24.600	103.850
13	Tzu-Wen Li	Chinese Taipei	24.650	25.850	25.550	24.050	110.100
14	Undram Khashbat	Mongolia	23.300	28.200	23.500	24.750	99.750
15	Kim Joowon	South Korea	27.000	19.850	25.500	23.000	95.350
16	Yi-Tong Lai	Chinese Taipei	30.850	22.600	23.100	23.450	93.800
17	Piyada Peeramatukorn	Thailand	24.650	23.750	22.550	22.400	93.500
18	Katelin Wie Qi Heng	Singapore	23.250	23.500	21.600	20.900	89.250

==== Hoop ====
Rank	Gymnast	Nation	Total
1st place, gold medalist(s)	Takhmina Ikromova	Uzbekistan	34.350
2nd place, silver medalist(s)	Elzhana Taniyeva	Kazakhstan	32.500
3rd place, bronze medalist(s)	Wang Zilu	China	32.500
4	Aibota Yertaikyzy	Kazakhstan	31.550
5	Mirano Kita	Japan	30.200
6	Yosmina Rakhimova	Uzbekistan	29.850
7	Zhao Yating	China	29.050
8	Aino Yamada	Japan	28.550

==== Ball ====
Rank	Gymnast	Nation	Total
1st place, gold medalist(s)	Takhmina Ikromova	Uzbekistan	34.550
2nd place, silver medalist(s)	Evelina Atalyants	Uzbekistan	34.050
3rd place, bronze medalist(s)	Elzhana Taniyeva	Kazakhstan	32.700
4	Aibota Yertaikyzy	Kazakhstan	31.300
5	Wang Zilu	China	29.750
6	Mirano Kita	Japan	29.650
7	Ha Sulee	South Korea	29.450
8	Breanna Labadan	Philippines	28.750

==== Clubs ====
Rank	Gymnast	Nation	Total
1st place, gold medalist(s)	Takhmina Ikromova	Uzbekistan	34.100
2nd place, silver medalist(s)	Yosmina Rakhimova	Uzbekistan	32.900
3rd place, bronze medalist(s)	Elzhana Taniyeva	Kazakhstan	31.900
4	Zhao Yating	China	30.300
5	Milana Parfilova	Kazakhstan	28.750
6	Mirano Kita	Japan	27.350
7	Wang Zilu	China	27.200
8	Kim Joowon	South Korea	26.150

==== Ribbon ====
Rank	Gymnast	Nation	Total
1st place, gold medalist(s)	Zhao Yating	China	31.450
2nd place, silver medalist(s)	Elzhana Taniyeva	Kazakhstan	30.800
3rd place, bronze medalist(s)	Yosmina Rakhimova	Uzbekistan	28.550
4	Wang Zilu	China	28.250
5	Aibota Yertaikyzy	Kazakhstan	28.100
6	Takhmina Ikromova	Uzbekistan	27.800
7	Mirano Kita	Japan	27.200
8	Aino Yamada	Japan	26.550

==== Groups All-Around ====
Place	Nation	5	3 + 2	Total
1st place, gold medalist(s)	China	35.150 (1)	33.700 (1)	68.850
2nd place, silver medalist(s)	Uzbekistan	34.050 (2)	31.650 (2)	65.700
3rd place, bronze medalist(s)	Japan	32.100 (3)	29.050 (3)	61.150
4	Kazakhstan	27.30 (4)	28.400 (4)	55.700
5	South Korea	22.550 (6)	26.900 (5)	49.450
6	Chinese Taipei	21.800 (7)	26.500 (6)	48.300
7	Thailand	23.950 (5)	23.600 (7)	47.550
8	India	19.400 (9)	16.600 (8)	36.000
9	Philippines	21.650 (8)	14.200 (11)	35.850
10	Mongolia	18.750 (10)	14.500 (10)	33.250
11	Kyrgyzstan	16.900 (11)	14.650 (9)	31.550

==== 5 Hoops ====
Rank	Nation	Total
1st place, gold medalist(s)	China	35.900
2nd place, silver medalist(s)	Japan	32.200
3rd place, bronze medalist(s)	Kazakhstan	30.950
4	Uzbekistan	29.950
5	South Korea	29.950
6	Thailand	24.350
7	Philippines	19.950
8	Chinese Taipei	19.950

==== 3 Ribbons + 2 Balls ====
Rank	Nation	Total
1st place, gold medalist(s)	China	33.800
2nd place, silver medalist(s)	Uzbekistan	31.050
3rd place, bronze medalist(s)	Kazakhstan	29.650
4	Japan	28.500
5	Chinese Taipei	25.700
6	South Korea	22.900
7	Thailand	21.550
8	India	16.100

=== Junior ===
==== Group All-Around ====
Rank	Nation	5	5	Total
1st place, gold medalist(s)	Uzbekistan	29.350	25.800	55.150
2nd place, silver medalist(s)	Kazakhstan	27.700	26.350	54.050
3rd place, bronze medalist(s)	Japan	23.600	26.450	50.050
4	Malaysia	22.850	23.750	46.600
5	South Korea	20.000	21.700	41.700
6	Kyrgyzstan	21.150	20.300	41.450
7	Thailand	20.200	20.650	40.850
8	Chinese Taipei	19.350	18.300	37.650
9	Mongolia	18.150	17.250	35.400
10	India	16.050	16.300	32.350

==== 5 Ropes ====
Rank	Nation	Total
1st place, gold medalist(s)	Kazakhstan	27.600
2nd place, silver medalist(s)	Uzbekistan	27.500
3rd place, bronze medalist(s)	Japan	25.100
4	Malaysia	22.650
5	Chinese Taipei	22.450
6	South Korea	21.750
7	Thailand	20.000
8	Kyrgyzstan	18.550

==== 5 Balls ====
Rank	Nation	Total
1st place, gold medalist(s)	Kazakhstan	28.500
2nd place, silver medalist(s)	Uzbekistan	25.750
3rd place, bronze medalist(s)	Japan	25.450
4	Kyrgyzstan	24.950
5	South Korea	23.950
6	Thailand	22.350
7	Malaysia	22.200
8	Chinese Taipei	18.800

==== Hoop ====
Rank	Gymnast	Nation	Total
1st place, gold medalist(s)	Anastasiya Sarantseva	Uzbekistan	31.700
2nd place, silver medalist(s)	Dariya Kusherbayeva	Kazakhstan	28.000
3rd place, bronze medalist(s)	Aleksandra Udodova	Kyrgyzstan	27.750
4	Park Seohyun	South Korea	24.550
5	Parina Rahul Madanpotra	India	24.250
6	Rina Maruyama	Japan	23.050
7	Nur Zhafirah Wong Rudy Kurniawan	Malaysia	22.800
8	Sophia Tan	Singapore	22.650

==== Ball ====
Rank	Gymnast	Nation	Total
1st place, gold medalist(s)	Aiym Meirzhanova	Kazakhstan	31.150
2nd place, silver medalist(s)	Nataliya Usova	Uzbekistan	30.400
3rd place, bronze medalist(s)	Yurisa Yamashita	Japan	26.500
4	Kim Daeun	South Korea	26.250
5	Arina Gazieva	Kyrgyzstan	25.600
6	Dhaffatul Nurbaiti Harman	Malaysia	23.750
7	Phatsaphon Thapthong	Thailand	23.250
8	Truc Uyen Nga Nguyen	Vietnam	22.900

==== Clubs ====
Rank	Gymnast	Nation	Total
1st place, gold medalist(s)	Lola Djuraeva	Uzbekistan	31.050
2nd place, silver medalist(s)	Aiym Meirzhanova	Kazakhstan	29.150
3rd place, bronze medalist(s)	Jasmine Althea Ramilo	Philippines	27.300
4	Saiana Sarynzhieva	Kyrgyzstan	26.450
5	Park Seohyun	South Korea	26.200
6	Rina Maruyama	Japan	25.250
7	Phatsaphon Thapthong	Thailand	24.050
8	Urangoo Namkhaibayar	Mongolia	22.700

==== Ribbon ====
Rank	Gymnast	Nation	Total
1st place, gold medalist(s)	Mishel Nesterova	Uzbekistan	29.400
2nd place, silver medalist(s)	Aiym Meirzhanova	Kazakhstan	28.050
3rd place, bronze medalist(s)	Kim Daeun	South Korea	25.350
4	Rina Maruyama	Japan	25.050
5	Jasmine Althea Ramilo	Philippines	24.950
6	Asema Badykeeva	Kyrgyzstan	24.700
7	Lezane Tan	Malaysia	20.900
8	Aiyyna Undrakh	Mongolia	20.250

== Medal count ==
=== Overall ===
* Host nation (Philippines)

Rank	Nation	Gold	Silver	Bronze	Total
1	Uzbekistan	8	7	1	16
2	China	4	0	2	6
3	Kazakhstan	3	7	4	14
4	Japan	0	1	6	7
5	Kyrgyzstan	0	0	1	1
5	Philippines*	0	0	1	1
5	South Korea	0	0	1	1
Totals (7 entries)		15	15	16	46
