= Sohn Ji-in =

South Korean rhythmic gymnast

- Full name: 손지인
- Born: 23 December 2006 (age 19) Gangnam-gu, Seoul, South Korea

Gymnastics career
- Country represented: South Korea; (2019)
- Club: Sejong High School RG
- Head coach: Park Hye-Young
Medal record
Representing South Korea
Rhythmic Gymnastics

- Sohn Ji-in
- Hangul: 손지인
- Hanja: 孫智仁
- RR: Son Jiin
- MR: Son Chiin

Sohn Jiin (Korean: 손지인; born 23 December 2006) is an individual South Korean rhythmic gymnast. She is the silver medalist at the 2022 Korean Senior National championships, and was the two years before the Korean junior national champion.

== Career ==
Sohn began her gymnastics career at age 6, when she was in kindergarten. In her first junior year, she won gold with ribbon at the Korean national competition "Cup of President". She participated at the Aeon Cup in Tokyo along two seniors gymnasts, Kim Chae-woon and Lim Se-eun, representing Sejong & Bongeun RG : they finished 6th in the qualification round. The following year, she became the junior national champion and went on to compete at the Moscow Grand Prix, where she placed 10th in the team event. She obtained a total score of 60, her best score being 15.15 with ball. In her last junior year, she maintained her national title. Internationally, she participated at the IT Sofia Cup, finishing 8th in the all-around and qualifying in the clubs final. She also participated at the FIG Gracia Fair Cup in Hungary, where she won the bronze medal in the all-around. At the national Cup of President, she won 4 gold medals, including the all-around.

=== Senior ===
She debuted as a senior at the Korean national senior championships; she won the silver medal behind Kim Joo-won. She participated at the competition with broken ribs, making it hard to compete.

== Routine music information ==
Year	Apparatus	Music title
2024	Hoop	"Prelude (The Age of Heroes)" by HAVASI
2024	Ball	"Fire" by 2NE1
2024	Clubs	"Party Rockers" by Gordon Goodwin's Big Phat Band
2024	Ribbon	"Volante" by Caleb Swift and Hypersonic Music
2023	Hoop	"Kill of the Night" by Gin Wigmore
2023	Ball	"Ondeia (Agua)" by Dulce Pontes
2023	Clubs	"Romani Holiday (Antonius Remix)" by Hans Zimmer
2023	Ribbon	"Floki Appears to Kill Athelstan" Vikings by Trevor Morris
2022	Hoop (first)	"Mechanisms" by Kirill Richter
2022	Hoop (second)	"Kill of the Night" by Gin Wigmore
2022	Ball	"Kiss" by Prince (Cover)
2022	Clubs	"Revolutions" by Jean-Michel Jarre
2022	Ribbon	"Ночь на лысой горе" by BELSUONO
