= Nanami Takenaka =

Japanese rhythmic gymnast

- 竹中 七海
- Born: 2 December 1998 (age 27) Aichi, Japan
- Height: 1.67 m (5 ft 5 1/2 in)

Gymnastics career
- Discipline: Rhythmic gymnastics
- Country represented: Japan (2017-2024)
- Club: Minami Gymnastics Club / Toyota Motor Corporation
- Head coach: Yukari Murata
Medal record
Rhythmic Gymnastics
Representing Japan
World Championships
Gold medal – first place	2019 Baku	5 Balls
Silver medal – second place	2017 Pesaro	3 Ropes + 2 Balls
Silver medal – second place	2019 Baku	Group All-around
Silver medal – second place	2019 Baku	3 Hoops + 4 Clubs
Bronze medal – third place	2017 Pesaro	Group All-around
Asian Championships
Gold medal – first place	2017 Astana	5 Hoops
Gold medal – first place	2017 Astana	3 Balls + 2 Ropes
Gold medal – first place	2017 Astana	Group All-around
Gold medal – first place	2019 Pattaya	Group All-Around
Gold medal – first place	2024 Tashkent	5 Hoops
Silver medal – second place	2019 Pattaya	5 Balls
Silver medal – second place	2022 Pattaya	Group All-Around
Silver medal – second place	2022 Pattaya	3 Ribbons + 2 Balls
Silver medal – second place	2023 Manila	5 Hoops
Silver medal – second place	2024 Tashkent	Group All-Around
Silver medal – second place	2024 Tashkent	3 Ribbons + 2 Balls
Bronze medal – third place	2019 Pattaya	3 Hoops + 4 Clubs
Bronze medal – third place	2022 Pattaya	5 Balls
Bronze medal – third place	2023 Manila	Group All-Around

Nanami Takenaka (竹中七海, Takenaka Nanami; born 2 December 1998) is a Japanese group rhythmic gymnast. She competed at the 2020 Summer Olympics.

== Personal life and early career ==
Takenaka began rhythmic gymnastics at age 5 after having a trial lesson because she found it fun. She began to train with the national team in her second year of middle school after being chosen at an audition, and she became a group member in her first year of high school.

She attended Japan Women's College of Physical Education and graduated in 2021.

== Career ==
Takenaka was a traveling reserve member of the Japanese group for the 2016 Summer Olympics. She strongly desired to compete on the floor at the next Summer Olympics.

Takenaka competed in her first World Championships in 2017 in Pesaro, Italy. The Japanese group won bronze in the group all-around, bronze in 5 hoops, and silver in 3 ropes + 2 balls. In 2018, she was presented with an award by the Japan Gymnastics Association.

She again represented Japan as part of the group at the 2019 World Championships. The team won silver in the group all-around. In the event finals, they won silver in 3 hoops + 4 clubs and gold in 5 balls. Their gold medal in the 5 balls final was the first gold World medal for a Japanese group, and they also won a place to compete at the 2020 Summer Olympics.

Takenaka was part of the Japanese group at the 2020 Summer Olympics. They qualified for the all-around final and finished in 8th place. Although at one point she had planned to retire from gymnastics after graduating university, Takenaka began to aim to compete at the upcoming 2024 Summer Olympics.

In 2022, Takenaka competed at the World Cup stage in Sofia. She competed in just the 3 ribbons + 2 balls routine, and the group won a bronze medal in that event final in addition to silver with 5 hoops. At the 2022 Asian Championships, the Japanese gymnasts won a bronze team medal, and the group won the all-around silver. They also won a bronze medal with 5 hoops and a silver in the 3 ribbons + 2 balls final.

At her third World Championships, Takenaka competed in both routines and came in 8th place in the all-around with the rest of the group. In qualifications, they made mistakes in the 3 ribbons + 2 balls routine, but they had a stronger 5 hoops routine and qualified for the event final, where they placed 5th.

In the next season, 2023, Takenaka again competed as part of the group at the Asian Championships. The group won the all-around bronze medal and also won a silver in one event final, 5 hoops.

She competed at the 2024 World Cup in Sofia in both routines for the Japanese group. They were 11th in the all-around and did not qualify for either event final. At the 2024 Asian Championships, Takenaka won silver in the group all-around and gold in the 5 hoops event final.
