= Nikol Krasiuk =

Ukrainian rhythmic gymnast

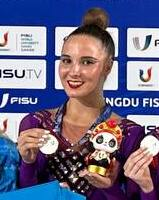
- Krasiuk at the 2021 Summer World University Games

Personal information
- Born: January 25, 2004 (age 22) Kharkiv, Ukraine

Gymnastics career
- Discipline: Rhythmic gymnastics
- Country represented: Ukraine; (2019-)
- Club: Deriugins School
- Head coach: Irina Deriugina
- Choreographer: Iryna Blokhina
Medal record
Rhythmic Gymnastics
Representing Ukraine
Event	1st	2nd	3rd
Summer Universiade	0	1	1
Junior European Championships	0	1	0
Total	0	2	1
Summer Universiade
Silver medal – second place	2021 Chengdu	Group all-around
Bronze medal – third place	2021 Chengdu	5 Hoops
Junior European Championships
Silver medal – second place	2019 Baku	5 Hoops

Nikol Krasiuk (born 25 January 2004) is a Ukrainian rhythmic gymnast and a member of the national group.

== Career ==
Krasiuk debuted in 2019 at the Junior World Championships in Moscow, where she finished 16th in teams, 9th with rope, 37th with ball, 5th in the clubs final and 19th with ribbon. That same year, she competed in the Aeon Cup (World Club Championships) representing the Deriugins School, where she took second place with her teammates Vlada Nikolchenko and Viktoriia Onopriienko. Individually, she took second in the junior division.

In 2022, after part of the previous team retired after the 2020 Olympics, she was incorporated into the national senior group. After a rough start because of the invasion of Ukraine, they debuted at the World Cup in Pesaro, where they were 11th in the all-around and 6th with 3 ribbons and 2 balls. In June she competed in Tel Aviv at the European Championships, taking 10th place in the all-around and 6th with 5 hoops. She also participated in the World Championships in Sofia along with her group teammates Yelyzaveta Azza, Diana Baieva, Daryna Duda, Anastasiya Voznyak, Oleksandra Yushchak, as well as the individuals Viktoriia Onopriienko, Polina Karika and Polina Horodnycha. The group finished 12th in the all-around and with 5 hoops as well as 11th with 3 ribbons and 2 balls.

In 2023 she competed, as a member of the national reserve group, at the 2021 Universiade in Chengdu, where she won silver in the all-around and bronze with 5 hoops.

== See also ==
- List of medalists at the Rhythmic Gymnastics Junior European Championships
