= Oleksandra Yushchak =

Ukrainian rhythmic gymnast

- Born: 12 January 2006 (age 20) Lutsk, Ukraine

Gymnastics career
- Discipline: Rhythmic gymnastics
- Country represented: Ukraine; (2022–)
- Club: Deriugins School
- Head coach: Irina Deriugina
- Assistant coach: Valentyna Gavryliuk
- Choreographer: Iryna Blokhina
Medal record
Rhythmic Gymnastics
Representing Ukraine
Event	1st	2nd	3rd
World Championships	1	0	2
European Championships	0	3	0
FIG World Cup	0	0	5
Total	1	3	7
World Championships
Gold medal – first place	2025 Rio de Janeiro	3 Balls + 2 Hoops
Bronze medal – third place	2023 Valencia	3 Ribbons + 2 Balls
Bronze medal – third place	2025 Rio de Janeiro	Team
European Championships
Silver medal – second place	2023 Baku	Team
Silver medal – second place	2025 Tallinn	Team
Silver medal – second place	2025 Tallinn	3 Balls + 2 Hoops
European Cup
Silver medal – second place	2025 Baku	3 Balls + 2 Hoops
Bronze medal – third place	2026 Baku	3 Hoop + 4 Clubs

Oleksandra Yushchak (Ukrainian: Олександра Ющак, born 12 January 2006) is a Ukrainian rhythmic gymnast. She won World bronze with 3 ribbons & 2 Balls in 2023.

== Career ==
=== 2022 ===
In 2022, after part of the previous team retired after the 2020 Olympics, Oleksandra was incorporated into the national senior group. After a rough start because of the invasion of Ukraine, they debuted at the World Cup in Pesaro being 11th in the All-Around and 6th with 3 ribbons and 2 balls. In June, she competed in Tel Aviv at the European Championships, taking 10th place in the All-Around and 6th with 5 hoops. She also participated in the World Championships in Sofia alongside Nikol Krasiuk, Diana Baieva, Daryna Duda, Anastasiya Voznyak, Yelyzaveta Azza and the individuals Viktoriia Onopriienko, Polina Karika and Polina Horodnycha, finishing 12th in the All-Around and with 5 hoops as well as 11th with 3 ribbons and 2 balls.

=== 2023 ===
The following year the group debuted at the World Cup in Athens ending 5th in the All-Around, 4th with 5 hoops and 8th with 3 ribbons & 2 balls. In Baku they were 4th in the All-Around, 7th in the mixed apparatus final and won bronze with 5 hoops. There a month later Oleksandra took part in the European Championships, the group was 4th in the All-Around and with 3 ribbons & 2 balls, 6th with 5 hoops, together with the individuals Viktoriia Onopriienko, Polina Karika and Polina Horodnycha the group won silver in teams. In July they were in Cluj-Napoca, finishing 5th in the All-Around, 7th and 8th in the event finals. In the last World Cup of the season in Milan they were 10th in the All-Around and 7th with 5 hoops. In late August Yushchak competed at the World Championships in Valencia along Yelyzaveta Azza, Diana Baieva, Daryna Duda, Alina Melnyk, Mariia Vysochanska and the two individuals Onopriienko and Kariika ending 6th in teams, being 5th in the All-Around granted them a spot for Paris 2024, 7th with 5 hoops they won bronze with 3 ribbons & 2 balls.

=== 2025 ===
In 2025 she returned to the main squad. In May, competing at the European Cup stage in Baku along Yelyzaveta Azza, Nadiia Yurina, Kira Shyyrkina, Anastasiia Ikan and Valeriia Peremeta, she won bronze in the All-Around and silver with 3 balls & 2 hoops. The group also competed at the 2025 European Championships in Tallinn, Estonia, and finished 8th in group all-around. Together with Polina Karika and Taisiia Onofriichuk they won silver medal in team competition. They won another silver in 3 Balls + 2 Hoops final. In late August, she was selected to represent Ukraine alongside Diana Baieva, Valeriia Peremeta, Yelyzaveta Azza, Kira Shyrykina and Nadiia Yurina at the 2025 World Championships in Rio de Janeiro, Brazil. They took 9th place in group all-around and won bronze medal in team competition together with Polina Karika and Taisiia Onofriichuk. They won a gold medal in 3 balls + 2 hoops final, second-ever gold medal in the group event for Ukraine and the first since the 2002 World Championships.

=== 2026 ===
In 2026 Oleksandra and her teammates Diana Baieva, Valeriia Peremeta, Yelyzaveta Azza, Kira Shyrykina and Polina Horodnycha competed at Tartu Grand Prix, winning gold medal in group all-around and 5 balls and bronze medal in 3 hoops + 4 clubs final. In March, they were 7th in all-around and 6th in 5 Balls final at Sofia World Cup. In April, they competed at Baku World Cup, and took 13th place in all-around. In early May, the group competed at European Cup in Baku, and won bronze medal in 3 Hoops + 4 Clubs. They took 5th place in 5 Balls.

On May 27-31, she competed at the 2026 European Championships in Varna, Bulgaria, alongside Diana Baieva, Valeriia Peremeta, Kira Shyrykina, Diana Baieva and Polina Horodnycha. They took 7th place in all-around, 9th place in team competition with Polina Karika and Taisiia Onofriichuk, and 4th place in mixed apparatus final. In June, they took 14th place in all-around at the World Challenge Cup Cluj-Napoca, after big mistakes in both routines. In July, they ended on 6th place in all-around at Milan World Cup and won bronze medal in 3 Hoops + 4 Clubs final.
