= Alina Melnyk =

Ukrainian rhythmic gymnast

- Born: 17 May 2005 (age 21) Lviv, Ukraine

Gymnastics career
- Discipline: Rhythmic gymnastics
- Country represented: Ukraine (2019–2025)
- Club: Deriugins School
- Head coach: Irina Deriugina
- Former coach: Iryna Ruda
- Choreographer: Iryna Blokhina
- Retired: yes
Medal record
Rhythmic Gymnastics
Representing Ukraine
World Championships
Bronze medal – third place	2023 Valencia	3 Ribbons + 2 Balls
European Championships
Silver medal – second place	2023 Baku	Team
Bronze medal – third place	2024 Budapest	3 Ribbon + 2 Balls

Alina Melnyk (Ukrainian: Аліна Мельник, born 17 May 2005) is a retired Ukrainian rhythmic gymnast. She represented 2024 Summer Olympics in the group all-around. She won a bronze medal at the 2023 World Championships in 3 ribbons and 2 balls, a silver medal in teams at the 2023 European Championships and a bronze medal at the 2024 European Championships in 3 ribbons and 2 balls.

== Career ==
=== Junior ===
Melnyk debuted on international level as a member of junior group, that competed at the 1st Junior World Championships in Moscow, placing 16th in both teams and the group all-Around. They did not advance into any apparatus finals.

=== Senior ===
As a senior, joined the national senior group, after the retirement of few members that competed at the 2020 Olympics. She competed at the 2021 World Championships in Kitakyushu being 4th in teams, 8th in the All-Around, 7th with 3 hoops & 4 clubs.

In 2023 the group debuted at the World Cup in Athens ending 5th in the All-Around, 4th with 5 hoops and 8th with 3 ribbons & 2 balls. In Baku they were 4th in the All-Around, 7th in the mixed apparatus final and won bronze with 5 hoops. There a month later Alina took part in the European Championships, the group was 4th in the All-Around and with 3 ribbons & 2 balls, 6th with 5 hoops, together with the individuals Viktoriia Onopriienko, Polina Karika and Polina Horodnycha the group won silver in teams. In July they were in Cluj-Napoca, finishing 5th in the All-Around, 7th and 8th in the event finals. In the last World Cup of the season in Milan they were 10th in the All-Around and 7th with 5 hoops. In late August Melnyk competed at the World Championships in Valencia along Yelyzaveta Azza, Diana Baieva, Daryna Duda, Oleksandra Yushchak, Mariia Vysochanska and the two individuals Onopriienko and Kariika ending 6th in teams, being 5th in the All-Around granted them a spot for Paris 2024, 7th with 5 hoops they won bronze with 3 ribbons & 2 balls.

She represented Ukraine at the 2024 Summer Olympics alongside Diana Baieva, Mariia Vysochanska, Kira Shyrykina, and Valeriia Peremeta. The group qualified for the all-around final in third place, including having the highest score in 3 ribbons and 2 balls. Then in the all-around final, the group sat in second place after the 5 hoops, but after several major mistakes in 3 ribbons and 2 balls, the group dropped to seventh place.

In March 2025 she announced her retirement from competitive sport via her Instagram profile.

== See also ==
- List of medalists at the Rhythmic Gymnastics Junior European Championships
