= Yelyzaveta Azza =

Ukrainian rhythmic gymnast

- Born: February 12, 2005 (age 21) Kirovograd, Ukraine

Gymnastics career
- Discipline: Rhythmic gymnastics
- Country represented: Ukraine; (2022–2026)
- Club: Deriugins School
- Head coach: Irina Deriugina
- Choreographer: Iryna Blokhina
- Retired: 2026
Medal record
Rhythmic Gymnastics
Representing Ukraine
World Championships
Gold medal – first place	2025 Rio de Janeiro	3 Balls + 2 Hoops
Bronze medal – third place	2023 Valencia	3 Ribbons + 2 Balls
Bronze medal – third place	2025 Rio de Janeiro	Team
European Championships
Silver medal – second place	2023 Baku	Team
Silver medal – second place	2025 Tallinn	Team
Silver medal – second place	2025 Tallinn	3 Balls + 2 Hoops
European Cup
Silver medal – second place	2025 Baku	3 Balls + 2 Hoops
Bronze medal – third place	2026 Baku	3 Hoop + 4 Clubs

Yelyzaveta Azza (Ukrainian: Єлизавета Азза, born 12 February 2005, Kirovograd) is a Ukrainian retired grou rhythmic gymnast.

== Career ==
=== 2022 ===
In 2022, after part of the previous team retired after the 2020 Olympics, Yelyzaveta was incorporated into the national senior group. After a rough start because of the invasion of Ukraine, they debuted at the World Cup in Pesaro being 11th in the All-Around and 6th with 3 ribbons and 2 balls. In June she competed in Tel Aviv at the European Championships, taking 10th place in the All-Around and 6th with 5 hoops. She also participated in the 2022 World Championships in Sofia, Bulgaria, alongside Nikol Krasiuk, Diana Baieva, Daryna Duda, Anastasiya Voznyak, Oleksandra Yushchak and the individuals Viktoriia Onopriienko, Polina Karika and Polina Horodnycha, finishing 12th in the All-Around and with 5 hoops as well as 11th with 3 ribbons and 2 balls.

=== 2023 ===
The following year the group debuted at the World Cup in Athens ending 5th in the All-Around, 4th with 5 hoops and 8th with 3 ribbons & 2 balls. In Baku they were 4th in the All-Around, 7th in the mixed apparatus final and won bronze with 5 hoops. There a month later Yelyzaveta took part in the 2023 European Championships, the group was 4th in the All-Around and with 3 ribbons & 2 balls, 6th with 5 hoops, together with the individuals Viktoriia Onopriienko, Polina Karika and Polina Horodnycha the group won silver in teams. In July they competed in Cluj-Napoca, finishing 5th in the All-Around, 7th and 8th in the event finals. In the last World Cup of the season in Milan they were 10th in the All-Around and 7th with 5 hoops. In late August, she competed at the World Championships in Valencia alongside Oleksandra Yushchak, Diana Baieva, Daryna Duda, Alina Melnyk, Mariia Vysochanska and the two individuals, Onopriienko and Kariika, ending 6th in teams. Finishing 5th in the group all-Around granted them a spot for Paris 2024. In apparatus finals, they were 7th with 5 hoops and won bronze medal with 3 ribbons & 2 balls. However, she was not chosen to be a part of the squad at the 2024 Olympic Games.

=== 2025 ===
She returned to the main senior group, after the retirement of Mariia Vysochanska and Alina Melnyk. She competed at the World Cup in Baku being 8th with 5 ribbons and 4th with 3 balls & 2 hoops, winning bronze in the All-Around. In May, competing at the European Cup stage in Baku along Nadiia Yurina, Valeriia Peremeta, Kira Shyyrkina, Anastasiia Ikan and Oleksandra Yushchak, she won bronze in the All-Around and silver with 3 balls & 2 hoops. The group also competed at the 2025 European Championships in Tallinn, Estonia, and finished 8th in group all-around. Together with Polina Karika and Taisiia Onofriichuk they won silver medal in team competition. They won another silver in 3 Balls + 2 Hoops final. In late August, she was selected to represent Ukraine alongside Diana Baieva, Valeriia Peremeta, Kira Shyrykina, Nadiia Yurina and Oleksandra Yushchak at the 2025 World Championships in Rio de Janeiro, Brazil. They took 9th place in group all-around and won bronze medal in team competition together with Polina Karika and Taisiia Onofriichuk. They won a gold medal in 3 balls + 2 hoops final, second-ever gold medal in the group event for Ukraine and the first since the 2002 World Championships.

=== 2026 ===
In 2026 Yelyzaveta and her teammates Diana Baieva, Valeriia Peremeta, Oleksandra Yushchak, Kira Shyrykina and Polina Horodnycha competed at Tartu Grand Prix, winning gold medal in group all-around and 5 balls and bronze medal in 3 hoops + 4 clubs final. In March, they were 7th in all-around and 6th in 5 Balls final at Sofia World Cup. In April, they competed at Baku World Cup, and took 13th place in all-around. In early May, the group competed at European Cup in Baku, and won bronze medal in 3 Hoops + 4 Clubs. They took 5th place in 5 Balls. In June, they took 14th place in all-around at the World Challenge Cup Cluj-Napoca, after big mistakes in both routines.

She announced her retirement on September 12, 2026 via her Instagram profile.
