= Kira Shyrykina =

Ukrainian rhythmic gymnast

- Full name: Kira Mykolaivna Shyrykina
- Born: 4 June 2008 (age 18) Dnipro, Ukraine

Gymnastics career
- Discipline: Rhythmic gymnastics
- Country represented: Ukraine; (2023 – present)
- Training location: Kyiv, Ukraine
- Club: Deriugins School
- Head coach: Irina Deriugina
- Former coach: Iryna Ruda
- Choreographer: Iryna Blokhina
Medal record
Rhythmic Gymnastics
Representing Ukraine
World Championships
Gold medal – first place	2025 Rio de Janeiro	3 Balls + 2 Hoops
Bronze medal – third place	2025 Rio de Janeiro	Team
European Championships
Silver medal – second place	2025 Tallinn	Team
Silver medal – second place	2025 Tallinn	3 Balls + 2 Hoops
Bronze medal – third place	2024 Budapest	3 Ribbon + 2 Balls
European Cup
Silver medal – second place	2025 Baku	3 Balls + 2 Hoops
Bronze medal – third place	2026 Baku	3 Hoop + 4 Clubs

Kira Mykolaivna Shyrykina (Ukrainian: Кіра Миколаївна Ширикіна; born 4 June 2008) is a Ukrainian rhythmic gymnast. She won a bronze medal with the Ukrainian group at the 2024 European Championships in 3 ribbon and 2 balls. She represented Ukraine at the 2024 Summer Olympics, where the group finished seventh in the all-around.

== Career ==
=== Junior ===
Shyrykina was part of the junior national group that competed at the 2023 World Championships in Cluj-Napoca. They finished fourth in the all-around and in both the 5 ropes and 5 hoops finals. Additionally, the Ukraine finished fourth in the team competition.

=== Senior ===
Shyrykina became age-eligible for senior competitions in 2024 and joined the Ukrainian senior national group. She made her debut at the Tartu Grand Prix where Ukraine swept the gold medals. Then at the Athens World Cup, they finished 13th in the all-around and fourth in the 5 hoops final. Then at the Sofia World Cup, they finished 10th in the all-around and seventh in the 5 hoops final. At the 2024 European Championships in Budapest, the group finished sixth in the all-around and fifth in the 5 hoops final. They then won the bronze medal in the 3 ribbons and 2 balls final behind Spain and Israel. Then in July, the group won two bronze medals at the 2024 Cluj-Napoca World Challenge Cup, in the all-around and 3 ribbons and 2 balls.

Shyrykina represented Ukraine at the 2024 Summer Olympics alongside Diana Baieva, Alina Melnyk, Mariia Vysochanska, and Valeriia Peremeta. The group qualified for the all-around final in third place, including having the highest score in 3 ribbons and 2 balls. Then in the all-around final, the group sat in second place after the 5 hoops, but after several major mistakes in 3 ribbons and 2 balls, the group dropped to seventh place.

In 2025 she continued her career, despite some members retiring. In May, competing at the European Cup stage in Baku along Yelyzaveta Azza, Nadiia Yurina, Valeriia Peremeta, Anastasiia Ikan and Oleksandra Yushchak, she won bronze in the All-Around and silver with 3 balls & 2 hoops. The group also competed at the 2025 European Championships in Tallinn, Estonia, and finished 8th in group all-around. Together with Polina Karika and Taisiia Onofriichuk they won silver medal in team competition. They won another silver in 3 Balls + 2 Hoops final. In late August, she was selected to represent Ukraine alongside Diana Baieva, Valeriia Peremeta, Yelyzaveta Azza, Nadiia Yurina and Oleksandra Yushchak at the 2025 World Championships in Rio de Janeiro, Brazil. They took 9th place in group all-around and won bronze medal in team competition together with Polina Karika and Taisiia Onofriichuk. They won a gold medal in 3 balls + 2 hoops final, second-ever gold medal in the group event for Ukraine and the first since the 2002 World Championships.

In 2026 Kira and her teammates Oleksandra Yushchak, Valeriia Peremeta, Yelyzaveta Azza, Diana Baieva and Polina Horodnycha competed at Tartu Grand Prix, winning gold medal in group all-around and 5 balls and bronze medal in 3 hoops + 4 clubs final. In March, they were 7th in all-around and 6th in 5 Balls final at Sofia World Cup. In April, they competed at Baku World Cup, and took 13th place in all-around. In early May, the group competed at European Cup in Baku, and won bronze medal in 3 Hoops + 4 Clubs. They took 5th place in 5 Balls. On May 27-31, she competed at the 2026 European Championships in Varna, Bulgaria, alongside Diana Baieva, Oleksandra Yushchak, Valeriia Peremeta, Taisiia Redka and Polina Horodnycha. They took 7th place in all-around, 9th place in team competition with Polina Karika and Taisiia Onofriichuk, and 4th place in mixed apparatus final.
