= Valeriia Peremeta =

Ukrainian rhythmic gymnast (born 2007)

- Born: 25 September 2007 (age 19) Mykolaiv, Ukraine

Gymnastics career
- Discipline: Rhythmic gymnastics
- Country represented: Ukraine; (2023–2026)
- Training location: Kyiv, Ukraine
- Club: Deriugins School
- Head coach: Irina Deriugina
- Former coach: Iryna Ruda
- Choreographer: Iryna Blokhina
- Retired: yes
Medal record
Rhythmic Gymnastics
Representing Ukraine
Event	1st	2nd	3rd
World Championships	1	0	1
European Championships	0	2	1
FIG World Cup	0	0	4
Total	1	2	6
World Championships
Gold medal – first place	2025 Rio de Janeiro	3 Balls + 2 Hoops
Bronze medal – third place	2025 Rio de Janeiro	Team
European Championships
Silver medal – second place	2025 Tallinn	Team
Silver medal – second place	2025 Tallinn	3 Balls + 2 Hoops
Bronze medal – third place	2024 Budapest	3 Ribbon + 2 Balls
European Cup
Silver medal – second place	2025 Baku	3 Balls + 2 Hoops
Bronze medal – third place	2026 Baku	3 Hoop + 4 Clubs

Valeriia Peremeta (born 25 September 2007) is a retired Ukrainian rhythmic gymnast. She won a bronze medal with the Ukrainian group at the 2024 European Championships in 3 ribbon and 2 balls. She represented Ukraine at the 2024 Summer Olympics, where the group finished seventh in the all-around.

== Career ==
=== 2024 ===
Peremeta joined the Ukrainian senior national group in 2024. She debuted at the Tartu Grand Prix where Ukraine swept the gold medals in the all-around and both event finals. At the Athens World Cup, they finished 13th in the all-around and fourth in the 5 hoops final. Then at the Sofia World Cup, they finished 10th in the all-around and seventh in the 5 hoops final. At the 2024 European Championships in Budapest, the group finished sixth in the all-around and fifth in the 5 hoops final. They then won the bronze medal in the 3 ribbons and 2 balls final, behind Spain and Israel. Then in July, the won bronze medals in the all-around and 3 ribbons and 2 balls at the Cluj-Napoca World Challenge Cup.

Peremeta represented Ukraine at the 2024 Summer Olympics alongside Diana Baieva, Alina Melnyk, Mariia Vysochanska, and Kira Shyrykina. The group qualified for the all-around final in third place, including having the highest score in 3 ribbons and 2 balls. Then in the all-around final, the group sat in second place after the 5 hoops, but after several major mistakes in 3 ribbons and 2 balls, the group dropped to seventh place.

=== 2025 ===
In 2025 she continued her career, despite some members retiring. In May, competing at the European Cup stage in Baku along Yelyzaveta Azza, Nadiia Yurina, Kira Shyyrkina, Anastasiia Ikan and Oleksandra Yushchak, she won bronze in the All-Around and silver with 3 balls & 2 hoops. The group also competed at the 2025 European Championships in Tallinn, Estonia, and finished 8th in group all-around. Together with Polina Karika and Taisiia Onofriichuk they won silver medal in team competition. They won another silver in 3 Balls + 2 Hoops final. In late August, she was selected to represent Ukraine alongside Diana Baieva, Yelyzaveta Azza, Kira Shyrykina, Nadiia Yurina and Oleksandra Yushchak at the 2025 World Championships in Rio de Janeiro, Brazil. They took 9th place in group all-around and won bronze medal in team competition together with Polina Karika and Taisiia Onofriichuk. They won a gold medal in 3 balls + 2 hoops final, second-ever gold medal in the group event for Ukraine and the first since the 2002 World Championships.

=== 2026 ===
In 2026 Peremeta and her teammates Oleksandra Yushchak, Diana Baieva, Yelyzaveta Azza, Kira Shyrykina and Polina Horodnycha competed at Tartu Grand Prix, winning gold medal in group all-around and 5 balls and bronze medal in 3 hoops + 4 clubs final. In March, they were 7th in all-around and 6th in 5 Balls final at Sofia World Cup. In April, they competed at Baku World Cup, and took 13th place in all-around. In early May, the group competed at European Cup in Baku, and won bronze medal in 3 Hoops + 4 Clubs. They took 5th place in 5 Balls.

On May 27-31, she competed at the 2026 European Championships in Varna, Bulgaria, alongside Diana Baieva, Oleksandra Yushchak, Kira Shyrykina, Taisiia Redka and Polina Horodnycha. They took 7th place in all-around, 9th place in team competition with Polina Karika and Taisiia Onofriichuk, and 4th place in mixed apparatus final. In June, they took 14th place in all-around at the World Challenge Cup Cluj-Napoca, after big mistakes in both routines. In July, they ended on 6th place in all-around at Milan World Cup and won bronze medal in 3 Hoops + 4 Clubs final.

On September 21, she announced her retirement from competitive sport on her Instagram profile.

== Awards ==
Peremeta received 50,000 hryvnias from the Mykolaiv City Council for her performances with the Ukrainian group in 2024.
