= 2025 Rhythmic Gymnastics World Championships =

Gymnastics championship edition

- Venue: Barra Olympic Park
- Location: Rio de Janeiro, Brazil
- Dates: 20–24 August 2025

The 2025 Rhythmic Gymnastics World Championships were held in Rio de Janeiro, Brazil at the Barra Olympic Park. This was the first world championships ever to be held in South America.

It was the first world championships held under the new 2025—2028 code of points, providing an early benchmark for national teams and individuals aiming for the Los Angeles 2028 Olympic Games. A record number of nations, 76, registered 109 individual gymnasts and 36 groups, with a total of 320 gymnasts registered to compete. Seven countries sent gymnasts for the first time: Aruba, Costa Rica, Cote d'Ivoire, Paraguay, Peru, Syria, and Tunisia.

Déborah Medrado was selected as the event's gymnastics ambassador.

Nine events were contested: five individual titles (all-around and four apparatus finals), three group titles (all-around and two apparatus finals), and a team title that combined the scores of the individuals and group of each nation in the qualifying round.

In the individual event, reigning all-around World champion Darja Varfolomeev defended her title, with 2022 World bronze medalist Stiliana Nikolova winning silver on her 20th birthday and 2022 World champion Sofia Raffaeli winning bronze. During the medal ceremony, the national anthem for Georgia was mistakenly played rather than that of Varfolomeev's country, Germany. In the apparatus finals, Varfolomeev also won every apparatus title except for hoop, which was won by Raffaeli; she dedicated her medal to Lorenzo Bonicelli, an Italian artistic gymnast who was hospitalized after an accident at the 2025 Summer World University Games. In the ball final, American Rin Keys won silver, which was the first-ever individual World medal won by gymnast from the Americas. Hatice Gokce Emir became the first Turkish gymnast to reach a final after qualifying for both the hoop and all-around finals.

In the group event, the Japanese group received the highest score of the all-around qualification with their second routine and narrowly won gold over the Brazilian group, while the Spanish group won bronze. This was the first medal won by Brazilian gymnasts at the World championships, making them the first gymnasts from the Americas to win a World Championship medal on a group competition. In the mixed final, Ukraine won its second-ever gold medal in the group event, the first since the 2002 World Championships, while the Brazilian team won a second silver and China won bronze. In the five ribbons final, China won gold, followed by Japan and Spain.

Germany won the team event, with Bulgaria winning silver and Ukraine bronze. The Fan Favorite award was given to Wang Zilu, and the Legend Award was given to Carmel Kallemaa, due to her being the oldest competitor at the event (27).

Due to technical issues with a new system for submitting scores, the group all-around scores were revised after the competition, leading to a few changes in standing.

== Participating countries ==
| Participants | Nations |
|---|---|
| Group + 3 individuals | Australia Hungary Mexico |
| Group + 2 individuals | Brazil Bulgaria Canada China Cyprus Spain France Germany Finland Israel Italy Japan Kazakhstan Poland Ukraine United States Uzbekistan |
| Group + 1 individual | Andorra Argentina Azerbaijan Chile Colombia Czech Republic Estonia Kyrgyzstan South Korea Lithuania Malaysia Norway South Africa Chinese Taipei Turkey Venezuela |
| 3 individuals | Egypt |
| 2 individuals | Romania |
| 1 individual | Angola Armenia Aruba Austria Belgium Bolivia Ivory Coast Cape Verde Costa Rica Croatia Cuba El Salvador Great Britain Georgia Guatemala Hong Kong India Laos Latvia Luxembourg Moldova Montenegro Namibia Netherlands New Zealand Paraguay Peru Philippines Portugal Puerto Rico Singapore Slovenia San Marino Switzerland Slovakia Sweden Syria Thailand Tunisia |

== Schedule ==
- Wednesday, August 20
  - All Day: Individual Qualification - Hoop and Ball
- Thursday, August 21
  - All Day: Individual Qualification - Clubs and Ribbon
- Friday, August 22
  - Individual All Around Final
- Saturday, August 23
  - All Day: Group All Around
- Sunday, August 24
  - Group 5 Ribbons Final & 3 Balls + 2 Hoops Final
  - Individual Hoop, Ball, Clubs & Ribbon Final

== Medal summary ==
| Event | Gold | Silver | Bronze |
|---|---|---|---|
Team Competition
| Team All-Around | Germany; Individuals; Anastasia Simakova; Darja Varfolomeev; Group; Melanie Dargel; Olivia Falk; Anja Kosan; Helena Ripken; Anna-Maria Shatokhin; Emilia Wickert | Bulgaria; Individuals; Eva Brezalieva; Stiliana Nikolova; Group; Danaya Atanasova; Sofia Ivanova; Alina Kolomiets; Emilia Obretenova; Rachel Stoyanov | Ukraine; Individuals; Polina Karika; Taisiia Onofriichuk; Group; Yelyzaveta Azza; Diana Baieva; Valeriia Peremeta; Kira Shyrykina; Oleksandra Yushchak |
Individual Finals
| All-Around | (Germany) Darja Varfolomeev | (Bulgaria) Stiliana Nikolova | (Italy) Sofia Raffaeli |
| Hoop | (Italy) Sofia Raffaeli | (Bulgaria) Stiliana Nikolova | (Germany) Anastasia Simakova |
| Ball | (Germany) Darja Varfolomeev | (United States) Rin Keys | (Italy) Sofia Raffaeli |
| Clubs | (Germany) Darja Varfolomeev | (Romania) Amalia Lică | (Bulgaria) Stiliana Nikolova |
| Ribbon | (Germany) Darja Varfolomeev | (Bulgaria) Stiliana Nikolova | (Ukraine) Taisiia Onofriichuk |
Groups Finals
| Group All-Around | Japan; Natsumi Hanamura; Rinako Inaki; Hatsune Miyoshi; Megumi Nishimoto; Ayuka Suzuki; Hisano Taguchi | Brazil; Maria Eduarda Arakaki; Maria Paula Caminha; Mariana Vitória Gonçalves; Sofia Pereira; Nicole Pircio | Spain; Ines Bergua; Andrea Corral; Marina Cortelles; Andrea Fernández; Lucía Muñoz; Salma Solaun |
| 5 Ribbons | China; Ding Xinyi; Liu Miaoting; Pu Yanzhu; Wang Lanjing; Zhang Xinyi; Zhao Wanzhu* | Japan; Natsumi Hanamura*; Rinako Inaki; Hatsune Miyoshi; Megumi Nishimoto; Ayuka Suzuki; Hisano Taguchi | Spain; Ines Bergua; Andrea Corral; Marina Cortelles*; Andrea Fernández; Lucía Muñoz; Salma Solaun |
| 3 Balls + 2 Hoops | Ukraine; Yelyzaveta Azza; Diana Baieva; Valeriia Peremeta; Kira Shyrykina; Oleksandra Yushchak | Brazil; Maria Eduarda Arakaki; Maria Paula Caminha; Mariana Vitória Gonçalves; Sofia Pereira; Nicole Pircio | China; Ding Xinyi; Liu Miaoting*; Pu Yanzhu; Wang Lanjing; Zhang Xinyi; Zhao Wanzhu |

* reserve gymnast

== Individual ==
=== Individual Qualification ===
- The top 8 scores in individual apparatus qualify to the apparatus finals and the top 18 in overall qualification scores advance to the all-around final.

| Rank | Gymnast | Nation | Hoop (rhythmic gymnastics) | Ball (rhythmic gymnastics) | Clubs (rhythmic gymnastics) | Ribbon (rhythmic gymnastics) | Total | ! |
|---|---|---|---|---|---|---|---|---|
| 1 | Darja Varfolomeev | Germany | 30.600 | 30.350 | 31.900 | 29.900 | 92.850 | Q |
| 2 | Taisiia Onofriichuk | Ukraine | 30.600 | 27.550 | 30.350 | 29.200 | 90.150 | Q |
| 3 | Stiliana Nikolova | Bulgaria | 29.350 | 28.950 | 30.050 | 29.050 | 88.800 | Q |
| 4 | Sofia Raffaeli | Italy | 28.700 | 28.350 | 30.300 | 26.850 | 87.350 | Q |
| 5 | Takhmina Ikromova | Uzbekistan | 28.400 | 28.000 | 29.600 | 27.500 | 86.300 | Q |
| 6 | Rin Keys | United States | 28.900 | 28.100 | 27.400 | 28.200 | 85.200 | Q |
| 7 | Anastasia Simakova | Germany | 28.000 | 27.250 | 27.700 | 28.200 | 84.700 | Q |
| 8 | Tara Dragas | Italy | 27.800 | 29.000 | 27.750 | 27.850 | 84.650 | Q |
| 9 | Meital Maayan Sumkin | Israel | 27.300 | 28.650 | 28.300 | 25.550 | 84.250 | Q |
| 10 | Polina Karika | Ukraine | 28.100 | 27.600 | 28.200 | 25.750 | 83.900 | Q |
| 11 | Daniela Munits | Israel | 26.700 | 28.000 | 28.550 | 27.150 | 83.750 | Q |
| 12 | Amalia Lică | Romania | 28.150 | 26.600 | 28.750 | 26.550 | 83.050 | Q |
| 13 | Geovanna Santos | Brazil | 28.400 | 27.500 | 27.700 | 26.800 | 83.050 | Q |
| 14 | Eva Brezalieva | Bulgaria | 28.250 | 27.300 | 27.350 | 27.050 | 83.350 | Q |
| 15 | Bárbara Domingos | Brazil | 28.350 | 27.250 | 25.150 | 27.200 | 82.800 | Q |
| 16 | Megan Chu | United States | 28.100 | 26.500 | 28.600 | 26.550 | 82.750 | Q |
| 17 | Liliana Lewińska | Poland | 27.000 | 26.500 | 29.000 | 26.900 | 82.700 | Q |
| 18 | Hatice Gokce Emir | Turkey | 28.500 | 27.000 | 27.000 | 25.600 | 82.700 | Q |
| 19 | Anastasiya Sarantseva | Uzbekistan | 26.600 | 28.100 | 27.050 | 27.550 | 82.700 | R1 |
| 20 | Alba Bautista | Spain | 27.650 | 26.550 | 27.950 | 28.300 | 82.450 | R2 |
| 21 | Reina Matsusaka | Japan | 27.450 | 27.050 | 27.800 | 25.350 | 82.450 | R3 |
| 22 | Wang Zilu | China | 28.000 | 23.500 | 28.650 | 23.900 | 81.350 | R4 |
| 23 | Andreea Verdeș | Romania | 28.050 | 25.850 | 27.450 | 25.600 | 81.350 | |
| 24 | Lucía González | Spain | 24.800 | 27.150 | 27.500 | 26.100 | 80.750 | |
| 25 | Aiym Meirzhanova | Kazakhstan | 27.150 | 26.250 | 26.050 | 26.900 | 80.350 | |
| 26 | Vera Tugolukova | Cyprus | 27.550 | 26.700 | 26.050 | 25.700 | 80.300 | |
| 27 | Mirano Kita | Japan | 26.550 | 25.700 | 27.350 | 24.650 | 79.600 | |
| 28 | Emilia Heichel | Poland | 26.450 | 25.000 | 25.100 | 25.000 | 79.550 | |
| 29 | Anette Vaher | Estonia | 26.750 | 26.700 | 25.950 | 25.900 | 78.700 | |
| 30 | Lauren Grueniger | Switzerland | 25.050 | 26.550 | 26.700 | 24.850 | 78.300 | |
| 31 | Miyabi Akiya | Australia | 25.950 | 25.600 | 26.750 | 23.900 | 78.300 | |
| 32 | Fanni Pigniczki | Hungary | 26.650 | 25.650 | 25.500 | 25.750 | 78.050 | |
| 33 | Emmi Piiroinen | Finland | 25.900 | 26.250 | 25.750 | 24.650 | 77.900 | |
| 34 | Aibota Yertaikyzy | Kazakhstan | 26.200 | 23.400 | 25.500 | 26.050 | 77.750 | |
| 35 | Alise Lebedeva | Latvia | 25.000 | 24.050 | 26.550 | 25.550 | 77.100 | |
| 36 | Mikayla Angeline Yang | Singapore | 25.300 | 25.450 | 26.350 | 24.750 | 77.100 | |
| 37 | Lily Ramonatxo | France | 25.800 | 24.800 | 26.300 | 23.650 | 76.900 | |
| 38 | Wang Zihan | China | 25.600 | 26.000 | 25.100 | 24.400 | 76.700 | |
| 39 | Lia Kallio | Finland | 23.250 | 25.850 | 25.550 | 24.600 | 76.000 | |
| 40 | Kayeon Jeong | Korea | 24.950 | 25.150 | 25.800 | 24.000 | 75.900 | |
| 41 | Suzanna Shahbazian | Canada | 25.000 | 22.950 | 26.150 | 24.100 | 75.250 | |
| 42 | Ng Joe Ee | Malaysia | 24.150 | 26.200 | 21.950 | 24.800 | 75.150 | |
| 43 | Marfa Ekimova | Great Britain | 25.550 | 24.300 | 24.800 | 23.900 | 74.650 | |
| 44 | Maëna Millon | France | 24.500 | 24.950 | 25.200 | 24.300 | 74.650 | |
| 45 | Havana Hopman | New Zealand | 24.800 | 24.500 | 24.950 | 24.450 | 74.250 | |
| 46 | Alja Ponikvar | Slovenia | 25.200 | 24.450 | 24.200 | 23.100 | 73.850 | |
| 47 | Tamara Artic | Croatia | 25.350 | 23.350 | 23.850 | 24.250 | 73.450 | |
| 48 | Marina Malpica | Mexico | 23.700 | 25.750 | 22.900 | 23.750 | 73.200 | |
| 49 | Hanna Panna Wiesner | Hungary | 22.500 | 23.950 | 26.650 | | 73.100 | |
| 50 | Maria Avgousti | Cyprus | 23.750 | 24.100 | 25.250 | 20.200 | 73.100 | |
| 51 | Maya Bijnens | Belgium | 21.900 | 24.000 | 25.900 | 22.850 | 72.750 | |
| 52 | Milana Tricolici | Lithuania | 24.950 | 22.950 | 24.500 | 22.950 | 72.400 | |
| 53 | Carmel Kallemaa | Canada | 24.550 | 22.750 | 23.700 | 24.000 | 72.250 | |
| 54 | Kamilla Seyidzade | Azerbaijan | 19.500 | 23.600 | 26.100 | 21.700 | 71.400 | |
| 55 | Emily Beznos | Moldova | 22.000 | 23.250 | 23.900 | 24.100 | 71.250 | |
| 56 | Nikola Novakova | Czech Republic | 18.700 | 24.400 | 24.350 | 22.300 | 71.050 | |
| 57 | Josephine Juul Møller | Norway | 23.350 | 23.000 | 24.400 | 22.700 | 70.750 | |
| 58 | Jimena Dominguez | Venezuela | 23.550 | 17.800 | 23.900 | 23.100 | 70.550 | |
| 59 | Luana Gomes | Angola | 24.550 | 23.550 | 22.350 | 21.250 | 70.450 | |
| 60 | Jasmine Althea Ramilo | Philippines | 22.200 | 24.100 | 23.850 | 20.300 | 70.150 | |
| 61 | Elina Sheremey | Sweden | 23.100 | 22.650 | 24.100 | 21.150 | 69.850 | |
| 62 | Isabella Rojas | Cuba | 23.550 | 23.100 | 23.150 | 22.500 | 69.800 | |
| 63 | Rita Araújo | Portugal | 24.000 | 22.800 | 22.550 | 21.750 | 69.350 | |
| 64 | Oriana Viñas | Colombia | 23.700 | 22.300 | 21.650 | 23.300 | 69.300 | |
| 65 | Tereza Saranova | Slovakia | 22.800 | 23.250 | 23.200 | 22.650 | 69.250 | |
| 66 | Gioia Casali | San Marino | 21.900 | 23.350 | 23.900 | 20.050 | 69.150 | |
| 67 | Mayte Guzman | Bolivia | 20.750 | 21.500 | 23.750 | 23.450 | 68.700 | |
| 68 | Berta Miquel | Andorra | 25.050 | 21.250 | 22.250 | 20.700 | 68.550 | |
| 69 | Mariami Kajaia | Georgia | 23.200 | 22.650 | 22.300 | 22.600 | 68.450 | |
| 70 | Olivia Martinez Suchkova | El Salvador | 22.650 | 21.850 | 23.650 | 19.800 | 68.150 | |
| 71 | Farida Mansy | Egypt | 20.700 | 24.500 | 22.400 | 19.700 | 67.600 | |
| 72 | Agostina Vargas Re | Argentina | 21.600 | 20.250 | 22.850 | 22.300 | 66.750 | |
| 73 | Praewa Misato Philaphandeth | Laos | 22.650 | 22.100 | 21.900 | 20.950 | 66.650 | |
| 74 | Ledia Behairy | Egypt | 19.800 | 22.700 | 21.850 | 22.050 | 66.600 | |
| 75 | Isabella Wang | Australia | | 19.900 | 22.300 | 23.700 | 65.900 | |
| 76 | Aleksandra Udodova | Kyrgyzstan | 21.750 | 19.850 | 22.550 | 21.050 | 65.350 | |
| 77 | Stephanie Dimitrova | South Africa | 21.100 | 22.350 | 19.650 | 21.650 | 65.100 | |
| 78 | Elena Meysembourg | Luxembourg | 21.100 | 22.400 | 19.350 | 21.350 | 64.850 | |
| 79 | Nina Dragovic | Montenegro | 17.500 | 21.500 | 22.250 | 20.950 | 64.700 | |
| 80 | Constanza Ortiz | Chile | 21.700 | 21.200 | 20.400 | 20.800 | 63.700 | |
| 81 | Tri Wahyuni | Indonesia | 21.100 | 22.050 | 19.250 | 19.850 | 63.000 | |
| 82 | Noa Gabrielle van der Laan | Netherlands | 21.700 | 19.900 | 16.200 | 21.000 | 62.600 | |
| 83 | Susana Dominguez | Paraguay | 21.050 | 20.100 | 21.200 | 20.300 | 62.550 | |
| 84 | Eya Boushih | Tunisia | 21.850 | 19.050 | 21.550 | 18.450 | 62.450 | |
| 85 | Tatev Khachatryan | Armenia | 20.000 | 20.350 | 19.350 | 21.200 | 61.550 | |
| 86 | Gloriana Sanchez Arguedas | Costa Rica | 19.900 | 20.350 | 20.450 | 20.750 | 61.550 | |
| 87 | Ya-Yun Chiang | Chinese Taipei | 20.250 | 21.600 | 19.450 | 19.250 | 61.300 | |
| 88 | Sikharee Sutthiragsa | Thailand | 18.150 | 19.100 | 21.850 | 19.500 | 60.450 | |
| 89 | Sanyukta Kale | India | 17.150 | 20.400 | 20.300 | 19.050 | 59.750 | |
| 90 | Daniella Gonzalez | Guatemala | 18.950 | 19.950 | 20.750 | 17.850 | 59.650 | |
| 91 | Ka Yi Hung | Hong Kong | 18.600 | 20.150 | 19.900 | 17.900 | 58.650 | |
| 92 | Elissar Hanounik | Syria | 19.750 | 19.050 | 17.100 | 18.400 | 57.200 | |
| 93 | Márcia Alves Lopes | Cape Verde | 16.700 | 18.100 | 19.400 | 17.550 | 55.050 | |
| 94 | Anais Ossonon | Côte d'Ivoire | 17.150 | 19.900 | 17.350 | 15.050 | 54.400 | |
| 95 | Lucerito Vargas | Peru | 15.750 | 15.850 | 18.100 | 15.950 | 49.900 | |
| 96 | Emilia Ekandjo | Namibia | 14.650 | 17.450 | 14.500 | 16.450 | 48.550 | |
| 97 | Ariana Croes | Aruba | 12.200 | 13.900 | 16.300 | 14.400 | 44.600 | |

=== All-Around Final ===
| Rank | Gymnast | Nation | Hoop (rhythmic gymnastics) | Ball (rhythmic gymnastics) | Clubs (rhythmic gymnastics) | Ribbon (rhythmic gymnastics) | Total |
|---|---|---|---|---|---|---|---|
| 1st place, gold medalist(s) | Darja Varfolomeev | Germany | 30.100 (2) | 29.850 (1) | 31.900 (1) | 30.000 (2) | 121.900 |
| 2nd place, silver medalist(s) | Stiliana Nikolova | Bulgaria | 28.700 (8) | 29.800 (2) | 30.650 (2) | 30.150 (1) | 119.300 |
| 3rd place, bronze medalist(s) | Sofia Raffaeli | Italy | 30.550 (1) | 29.100 (3) | 29.000 (6) | 29.300 (4) | 117.950 |
| 4 | Taisiia Onofriichuk | Ukraine | 29.950 (3) | 28.400 (6) | 29.300 (4) | 29.750 (3) | 117.400 |
| 5 | Takhmina Ikromova | Uzbekistan | 29.550 (4) | 27.900 (10) | 29.650 (3) | 27.550 (10) | 114.650 |
| 6 | Anastasia Simakova | Germany | 29.550 (5) | 27.900 | 28.450 (9) | 28.400 (5) | 114.300 |
| 7 | Rin Keys | United States | 29.100 (6) | 28.650 (5) | 28.200 (10) | 26.700 | 112.650 |
| 8 | Eva Brezalieva | Bulgaria | 28.450 (9) | 27.950 (9) | 28.800 (7) | 27.000 | 112.200 |
| 9 | Bárbara Domingos | Brazil | 28.250 (10) | 27.250 | 29.100 (5) | 27.600 (9) | 112.200 |
| 10 | Meital Maayan Sumkin | Israel | 27.300 | 29.100 (4) | 26.250 | 28.250 (7) | 110.900 |
| 11 | Polina Karika | Ukraine | 27.650 | 27.800 | 28.750 (8) | 26.400 | 110.600 |
| 12 | Megan Chu | United States | 27.650 | 27.150 | 28.100 | 27.050 | 109.950 |
| 13 | Tara Dragas | Italy | 27.900 | 28.250 (7) | 25.700 | 28.000 (8) | 109.850 |
| 14 | Hatice Gokce Emir | Turkey | 28.150 | 26.750 | 27.350 | 27.100 | 109.350 |
| 15 | Daniela Munits | Israel | 26.050 | 26.800 | 27.300 | 28.250 (6) | 108.400 |
| 16 | Liliana Lewińska | Poland | 28.850 (7) | 24.550 | 27.450 | 27.450 | 108.300 |
| 17 | Amalia Lică | Romania | 27.950 | 28.050 (8) | 25.000 | 26.500 | 107.500 |
| 18 | Geovanna Santos | Brazil | 28.250 | 27.700 | 27.800 | 23.700 | 107.450 |

=== Hoop ===
| Rank | Gymnast | Nation | D Score | E Score | A Score | Pen. | Total |
|---|---|---|---|---|---|---|---|
| 1st place, gold medalist(s) | Sofia Raffaeli | Italy | 13.500 | 8.500 | 8.650 | | 30.650 |
| 2nd place, silver medalist(s) | Stiliana Nikolova | Bulgaria | 13.400 | 8.350 | 8.200 | | 29.950 |
| 3rd place, bronze medalist(s) | Anastasia Simakova | Germany | 13.200 | 8.300 | 7.900 | | 29.400 |
| 4 | Rin Keys | United States | 12.700 | 8.300 | 8.200 | | 29.200 |
| 5 | Darja Varfolomeev | Germany | 12.400 | 8.300 | 8.200 | | 28.950 |
| 6 | Taisiia Onofriichuk | Ukraine | 12.700 | 7.900 | 8.250 | | 28.850 |
| 7 | Hatice Gokce Emir | Turkey | 12.400 | 7.950 | 7.900 | | 28.250 |
| 8 | Wang Zilu | China | 11.500 | 7.800 | 8.100 | | 27.400 |

=== Ball ===
| Rank | Gymnast | Nation | D Score | E Score | A Score | Pen. | Total |
|---|---|---|---|---|---|---|---|
| 1st place, gold medalist(s) | Darja Varfolomeev | Germany | 12.600 | 8.600 | 8.650 | | 29.850 |
| 2nd place, silver medalist(s) | Rin Keys | United States | 12.300 | 8.500 | 8.250 | | 29.050 |
| 3rd place, bronze medalist(s) | Sofia Raffaeli | Italy | 12.100 | 8.250 | 8.400 | | 28.750 |
| 4 | Takhmina Ikromova | Uzbekistan | 12.100 | 8.250 | 8.350 | | 28.700 |
| 5 | Stiliana Nikolova | Bulgaria | 12.100 | 7.950 | 8.450 | | 28.500 |
| 6 | Tara Dragas | Italy | 11.900 | 8.100 | 8.050 | | 28.050 |
| 7 | Meital Maayan Sumkin | Israel | 11.200 | 8.100 | 8.200 | | 27.500 |
| 8 | Polina Karika | Ukraine | 10.700 | 8.000 | 7.950 | | 26.650 |

=== Clubs ===
| Rank | Gymnast | Nation | D Score | E Score | A Score | Pen. | Total |
|---|---|---|---|---|---|---|---|
| 1st place, gold medalist(s) | Darja Varfolomeev | Germany | 14.700 | 8.500 | 8.500 | | 31.700 |
| 2nd place, silver medalist(s) | Amalia Lică | Romania | 13.000 | 8.100 | 7.900 | | 29.000 |
| 3rd place, bronze medalist(s) | Stiliana Nikolova | Bulgaria | 13.000 | 7.650 | 8.200 | 0.05 | 28.800 |
| 4 | Taisiia Onofriichuk | Ukraine | 12.300 | 8.300 | 8.150 | | 28.750 |
| 5 | Sofia Raffaeli | Italy | 12.600 | 7.550 | 8.250 | | 28.400 |
| 6 | Liliana Lewińska | Poland | 12.300 | 7.650 | 8.000 | 0.05 | 27.900 |
| 7 | Wang Zilu | China | 11.300 | 7.500 | 8.400 | | 27.200 |
| 8 | Takhmina Ikromova | Uzbekistan | 11.200 | 6.950 | 7.850 | | 26.000 |

=== Ribbon ===
| Rank | Gymnast | Nation | D Score | E Score | A Score | Pen. | Total |
|---|---|---|---|---|---|---|---|
| 1st place, gold medalist(s) | Darja Varfolomeev | Germany | 13.200 | 8.600 | 8.450 | | 30.250 |
| 2nd place, silver medalist(s) | Stiliana Nikolova | Bulgaria | 13.000 | 8.350 | 8.450 | | 29.800 |
| 3rd place, bronze medalist(s) | Taisiia Onofriichuk | Ukraine | 12.400 | 8.250 | 8.450 | | 29.100 |
| 4 | Tara Dragas | Italy | 12.400 | 8.100 | 8.350 | 0.05 | 28.800 |
| 5 | Rin Keys | United States | 11.600 | 8.300 | 8.200 | | 28.100 |
| 6 | Anastasia Simakova | Germany | 12.200 | 8.100 | 7.800 | | 28.100 |
| 7 | Eva Brezalieva | Bulgaria | 12.000 | 8.200 | 7.850 | | 28.050 |
| 8 | Anastasiya Sarantseva | Uzbekistan | 11.300 | 7.950 | 7.900 | | 27.150 |

== Groups ==
=== Squads ===
| Team | Andorra (AND) | Argentina (ARG) | Australia (AUS) | Azerbaijan (AZE) | Brazil (BRA) | Bulgaria (BUL) |
| Members | Carolina De Sousa; Aitana Garcia; Elsa Kampfraat; Astrid Rieger; Carmela Tonino | Lara Agostina Aimeri Vicentin; Lucia Arrascaeta; Pilar Cattaneo; Lucia Belen González Negri; Camila Schaffer | Trinity Ferrer-Bucal; Millie Hintz; Elizabeth Lee; Brianna Parker; Reina Santana; Mia Strachan | Gullu Aghalarzade; Laman Alimuradova; Kamilla Aliyeva; Yelyzaveta Luzan; Sofiya Mammadova; Darya Sorokina | Maria Eduarda Arakaki; Maria Paula Caminha; Mariana Vitória Gonçalves; Sofia Pereira; Nicole Pircio | Danaya Atanasova; Sofia Ivanova; Alina Kolomiets; Emilia Obretenova; Rachel Stoyanov |
| Team | Canada (CAN) | Chile (CHI) | China (CHN) | Colombia (COL) | Cyprus (CYP) | Czech Republic (CZE) |
| Members | Jana Alemam; Dina Burak; Elise Ghosh; Margaret Kuts; Audrey Lu; Elizabet Piskunov | Martina Espejo; Antonia Gallegos; Annalena Ley; Isabel Lozano; Josefina Romero; Martina Valdes | Ding Xinyi; Liu Miaoting; Pu Yanzhu; Wang Lanjing; Zhang Xinyi; Wanzhu Zhao | Karen Duarte; Natalia Jimenez; Laura Patiño; Ashlee Patiño; Kizzy Rivas | Aikaterini Christofi; Mikaela Eleftheriou; Loukia Foti; Sotiroulla Marselli; Kallia Sokratous | Anna Deimova; Lucie Kudrnova; Iva Nejezchlebova; Adela Podlahova; Sofie Ella Urbanova |
| Team | Spain (ESP) | Estonia (EST) | Finland (FIN) | France (FRA) | Germany (GER) | Hungary (HUN) |
| Members | Ines Bergua; Andrea Corral; Marina Cortelles; Andrea Fernández; Lucía Muñoz; Salma Solaun | Ester Kreitsman; Elys Kretelle Kukk; Ksenja Ozigina; Johanna Simone Pertens; Polina Tubaleva; Valeria Valasevits | Nea Kapiainen; Miisa Kurvi; Lumi Maekinen; Anni Olkkonen; Anastasiia Polishchuk | Maëlys Laporte; Justine Lavit; Shana Loxton-Vernaton; Salome Lozano Leon; Naia Okasha; Margaux Sol | Melanie Dargel; Olivia Falk; Anja Kosan; Helena Ripken; Anna-Maria Shatokhin; Emilia Wickert | Julia Farkas; Lilla Jurca; Mandula Virag Meszaros; Dalma Pesti; Dora Szabados; Monika Urban-Szabo |
| Team | Israel (ISR) | Italy (ITA) | Japan (JPN) | Kazakhstan (KAZ) | Kyrgyzstan (KGZ) | Lithuania (LTU) |
| Members | Maya Gamliel; Agam Gev; Arina Gvozdetskaia; Varvara Salenkova; Kristina Eilon Ternovski | Chiara Badii; Laura Golfarelli; Alexandra Naclerio; Laura Paris; Giulia Segatori; Sofia Sicignano | Natsumi Hanamura; Rinako Inaki; Hatsune Miyoshi; Megumi Nishimoto; Ayuka Suzuki; Hisano Taguchi | Kristina Chepulskaya; Jasmine Junusbayeva; Aizere Kenges; Aida Khakimzhanova; Madina Myrzabay; Aizere Nurmagambetova | Ariana Keliotis; Saadat Kulmatova; Maiia Markelova; Arulana Moldobekova; Ailun Suerkulova | Diana Artiomova; Ugne Madzajute; Roberta Ranonyte; Patrycija Slotvinska; Vile Sperskaite; Neda Vaivadaite |
| Team | Malaysia (MAS) | Mexico (MEX) | Norway (NOR) | Poland (POL) | South Africa (RSA) | South Korea (KOR) |
| Members | Xian Yar Lim; Valerie Zi Yi NG; Maia Ong Xiao Han Ong; Qin Nin Bernice See; Victoria Tan; Chloe Yap Chun Li Yap | Dalia Alcocer; Sofia Flores; Julia Gutierrez; Fernanda Salas; Kimberly Salazar; Adirem Tejeda | Julia Soelberg Dahl; Kristine Falck Esaiassen; Hannah Sofie Larsen Loso; Alice Madelen Otterlei; Maya Stoeback-Arthur | Maria Aszklar; Vesna Pietrzak; Madoka Przybylska; Magdalena Szewczuk; Melody Wasiewicz-Hanc; Julia Wojciechowska | Nadia Bruyns; Ava De Bruin; Aaliyah Kuvido; Jadi Malan; Danni Vermaak; Chloe Wolstenholme | Habyn Cho; Jiwoo Kim; Minseul Kim; Jungeun Lee; Suyeon Park; Ekaterina Yan |
| Team | Chinese Taipei (TPE) | Turkiye (TUR) | Ukraine (UKR) | United States (USA) | Uzbekistan (UZB) | Venezuela (VEN) |
| Members | Yung-Chi Chen; Yi-An Chuang; Yun-Jen Huang; Jie-Chi Ju; Pei-Chi Lu; Yu-Kuan Pan | Aleyna Gursoy; Arina Iuniashina; Kseniia Iuniashina; Melek Duru Ozen; Anika Rashitov; Irem Sircan | Yelyzaveta Azza; Diana Baieva; Valeriia Peremeta; Kira Shyrykina; Nadiia Yurina; Oleksandra Yushchak | Goda Balsys; Annabella Hantov; Greta Pavilonyte; Alaini Spata; Kalina Trayanov; Natalia Ye-Granda | Evelina Atalyants; Adelya Fayzulina; Mumtozabonu Iskhokzoda; Amaliya Mamedova; Irodakhon Sadikova; Maftuna Zoirova | Mariana Dona; Maria Victoria Escobar; Kaily Ramirez; Gabriela Rodriguez; Samantha Rojas |

=== All-Around ===
The top 8 scores in the apparatus qualifies to the group apparatus finals.

| Place | Nation | 5 | 3 + 2 | Total |
|---|---|---|---|---|
| 1st place, gold medalist(s) | Japan | 27.200 | 28.350 | 55.550 |
| 2nd place, silver medalist(s) | Brazil | 27.400 | 27.850 | 55.250 |
| 3rd place, bronze medalist(s) | Spain | 26.500 | 28.250 | 54.750 |
| 4 | China | 26.250 | 27.450 | 53.700 |
| 5 | Israel | 26.250 | 26.900 | 53.150 |
| 6 | Bulgaria | 27.750 | 25.400 | 53.150 |
| 7 | Poland | 26.150 | 26.550 | 52.700 |
| 8 | Germany | 25.450 | 26.350 | 51.800 |
| 9 | Ukraine | 23.550 | 27.650 | 51.200 |
| 10 | France | 23.800 | 26.500 | 50.300 |
| 11 | Mexico | 22.750 | 26.100 | 48.850 |
| 12 | Estonia | 24.300 | 23.050 | 47.350 |
| 13 | Azerbaijan | 23.650 | 23.300 | 46.950 |
| 14 | Uzbekistan | 26.050 | 20.400 | 46.450 |
| 15 | Italy | 23.150 | 23.150 | 46.300 |
| 16 | Finland | 23.850 | 22.000 | 45.850 |
| 17 | Hungary | 18.400 | 27.050 | 45.450 |
| 18 | Kazakhstan | 21.150 | 24.000 | 44.150 |
| 19 | Turkey | 22.950 | 21.000 | 43.950 |
| 20 | South Korea | 19.100 | 23.350 | 42.450 |
| 21 | Malaysia | 20.400 | 20.450 | 40.850 |
| 22 | Lithuania | 19.400 | 21.400 | 40.800 |
| 23 | Czech Republic | 19.700 | 20.900 | 40.600 |
| 24 | Canada | 16.600 | 23.900 | 40.500 |
| 25 | Chinese Taipei | 13.650 | 22.750 | 36.400 |
| 26 | Norway | 14.700 | 21.600 | 36.300 |
| 27 | Chile | 17.350 | 18.250 | 35.600 |
| 28 | Andorra | 16.100 | 19.050 | 35.150 |
| 29 | Venezuela | 13.850 | 20.200 | 34.050 |
| 30 | Cyprus | 15.000 | 17.800 | 32.800 |
| 31 | United States | 8.000 | 24.700 | 32.700 |
| 32 | Kyrgyzstan | 12.500 | 18.850 | 31.350 |
| 33 | Australia | 14.250 | 17.100 | 31.350 |
| 34 | Argentina | 10.250 | 18.600 | 28.850 |
| 35 | Colombia | 14.400 | 13.600 | 28.000 |
| 36 | South Africa | 9.700 | 13.650 | 23.350 |

=== 5 Ribbons ===
| Rank | Nation | D Score | E Score | A Score | Pen. | Total |
|---|---|---|---|---|---|---|
| 1st place, gold medalist(s) | China | 12.900 | 6.450 | 8.200 | 0.000 | 27.550 |
| 2nd place, silver medalist(s) | Japan | 12.200 | 6.250 | 8.200 | 0.000 | 26.650 |
| 3rd place, bronze medalist(s) | Spain | 12.000 | 6.150 | 7.800 | 0.000 | 25.950 |
| 4 | Israel | 10.800 | 6.700 | 7.800 | 0.000 | 25.300 |
| 5 | Bulgaria | 12.000 | 5.400 | 7.650 | -0.300 | 24.750 |
| 6 | Brazil | 10.500 | 5.350 | 7.300 | -0.300 | 22.850 |
| 7 | Poland | 10.200 | 5.500 | 6.800 | 0.000 | 22.500 |
| 8 | Uzbekistan | 10.200 | 5.450 | 6.800 | 0.000 | 22.450 |

=== 3 Balls + 2 Hoops ===
| Rank | Nation | D Score | E Score | A Score | Pen. | Total |
|---|---|---|---|---|---|---|
| 1st place, gold medalist(s) | Ukraine | 13.200 | 7.500 | 7.950 | 0.000 | 28.650 |
| 2nd place, silver medalist(s) | Brazil | 13.000 | 7.350 | 8.200 | 0.000 | 28.550 |
| 3rd place, bronze medalist(s) | China | 13.100 | 7.150 | 8.100 | 0.000 | 28.350 |
| 4 | Spain | 13.400 | 7.000 | 7.800 | 0.000 | 28.200 |
| 5 | Japan | 12.600 | 6.800 | 7.950 | 0.000 | 27.350 |
| 6 | Israel | 11.900 | 7.500 | 7.850 | 0.000 | 27.250 |
| 7 | Hungary | 11.800 | 6.800 | 7.650 | 0.000 | 26.250 |
| 8 | Poland | 10.600 | 6.000 | 7.450 | 0.000 | 24.050 |

== Team ==
=== Combined Team Ranking ===
| Place | Nation | Hoop (rhythmic gymnastics) | Ball (rhythmic gymnastics) | Clubs (rhythmic gymnastics) | Ribbon (rhythmic gymnastics) | 5 | 3 + 2 | Total |
|---|---|---|---|---|---|---|---|---|
| 1st place, gold medalist(s) | Germany | 59.400 | 57.600 | 59.600 | 58.100 | 25.450 | 26.350 | 286.500 |
| 2nd place, silver medalist(s) | Bulgaria | 57.500 | 56.750 | 57.250 | 56.900 | 27.750 | 25.400 | 281.550 |
| 3rd place, bronze medalist(s) | Ukraine | 58.700 | 55.150 | 58.550 | 54.950 | 23.550 | 27.650 | 278.550 |
| 4 | Brazil | 56.750 | 54.750 | 52.750 | 54.000 | 27.400 | 27.850 | 273.500 |
| 5 | Israel | 55.350 | 54.850 | 56.850 | 52.700 | 26.250 | 26.900 | 272.900 |
| 6 | Italy | 56.500 | 57.350 | 58.050 | 54.700 | 23.150 | 23.150 | 272.900 |
| 7 | Uzbekistan | 56.450 | 54.900 | 56.700 | 55.050 | 26.050 | 20.400 | 269.550 |
| 8 | Spain | 52.450 | 53.700 | 55.450 | 52.950 | 26.500 | 28.250 | 269.300 |
| 9 | Japan | 54.000 | 52.750 | 55.150 | 47.900 | 27.200 | 28.350 | 265.350 |
| 10 | Poland | 53.250 | 48.400 | 56.500 | 52.500 | 26.150 | 26.550 | 263.350 |
| 11 | China | 54.400 | 49.500 | 53.750 | 48.300 | 26.250 | 27.450 | 259.650 |
| 12 | USA | 56.500 | 53.650 | 56.000 | 54.750 | 8.000 | 24.700 | 253.600 |
| 13 | Kazakhstan | 53.350 | 49.650 | 51.550 | 53.000 | 21.150 | 24.000 | 252.700 |
| 14 | France | 50.300 | 49.750 | 51.500 | 47.950 | 23.800 | 26.500 | 249.800 |
| 15 | Hungary | 49.150 | 52.450 | 49.450 | 52.400 | 18.400 | 27.050 | 248.900 |
| 16 | Finland | 49.150 | 52.100 | 51.300 | 49.250 | 23.850 | 22.000 | 247.650 |
| 17 | Mexico | 49.250 | 47.850 | 46.650 | 45.400 | 22.750 | 26.100 | 238.000 |
| 18 | Canada | 49.550 | 45.700 | 49.850 | 48.100 | 16.600 | 23.900 | 233.700 |
| 19 | Cyprus | 51.300 | 50.600 | 51.500 | 45.900 | 15.000 | 17.800 | 232.100 |
| 20 | Australia | 50.000 | 45.500 | 49.050 | 47.600 | 14.250 | 17.100 | 223.500 |

== Medal table ==
* Host nation (Brazil)

| Rank | Nation | Gold | Silver | Bronze | Total |
|---|---|---|---|---|---|
| 1 | Germany | 5 | 0 | 1 | 6 |
| 2 | Japan | 1 | 1 | 0 | 2 |
| 3 | Italy | 1 | 0 | 2 | 3 |
| 3 | Ukraine | 1 | 0 | 2 | 3 |
| 5 | China | 1 | 0 | 1 | 2 |
| 6 | Bulgaria | 0 | 4 | 1 | 5 |
| 7 | Brazil* | 0 | 2 | 0 | 2 |
| 8 | Romania | 0 | 1 | 0 | 1 |
| 8 | United States | 0 | 1 | 0 | 1 |
| 10 | Spain | 0 | 0 | 2 | 2 |
| Totals (10 entries) | | 9 | 9 | 9 | 27 |
