= Anastasiia Ikan =

Ukrainian rhythmic gymnast (born 2007)

- Born: 16 February 2007 (age 19) Kharkiv, Ukraine

Gymnastics career
- Discipline: Rhythmic gymnastics
- Country represented: Ukraine; (2021–)
- Training location: Kyiv, Ukraine
- Club: Deriugins School
- Head coach: Irina Deriugina
- Choreographer: Iryna Blokhina
Medal record
Rhythmic Gymnastics
Representing Ukraine
European Championships
Silver medal – second place	2025 Tallinn	Team
Silver medal – second place	2025 Tallinn	3 Balls + 2 Hoops
European Cup
Silver medal – second place	2025 Baku	3 Balls + 2 Hoops

Anastasiia Ikan (born 16 February 2007) is a Ukrainian rhythmic gymnast. She represents Ukraine in international competitions.

== Career ==
=== Junior ===
She was selected to be a part of junior national group that represented Ukraine at the 2021 Junior European Championships in Varna, Bulgaria. Anastasiia and her teammates (Yelyzaveta Nabyvach, Valeriya Panchenko, Alina Pertseva, Snizhana Oshchipko, Karina Sydorak) took 6th place in all-around and 5th place in both 5 balls and 5 ribbons finals.

=== Senior ===
In October 2023 Ikan took bronze at the Ukrainian Championships behind Viktoriia Onopriienko and Vlada Nikolchenko. A month later she won gold in the All-Around and with clubs at the Warsaw Autumn tournament.

In 2024 she was 8th in all-around at the Miss Valentine Grand Prix in Tartu. In April she won bronze with hoop at the Sofia International Tournament. Competing at the inaugural European Cup in Baku she finished 8th in the ball final. At National Championships she became the all-around vice champion behind Taisiia Onofriichuk. She was then named a reserve for the 2024 European Championships in Budapest. In October, she won bronze in all-around and clubs, silver with hoop and ribbon at the Dalia Kutkaite Cup.

The following year she competed with Ginnastica Cervia in the Italian Club Championships. In March, she competed at the 2025 Miss Valentine Grand Prix and took 4th place in all-around. She did not advance into apparatus finals due to two per country rule. Weeks later her club was 5th in the serie A1. At the Grand Prix in Marbella she was 7th in all-Around and won bronze medal in the clubs final. At Grand Prix in Thiais, France she finished 4th in all-around and 6th in ball final. In May she integrated the national group, competing at the European Cup stage in Baku where, along Yelyzaveta Azza, Valeriia Peremeta, Kira Shyrykina, Nadiia Yurina and Oleksandra Yushchak, she won bronze in the All-Around and silver with 3 balls & 2 hoops. On May 9-11, she competed at World Challenge Cup Portimão and took 8th place in all-around. She also ended on 7th place in hoop and ball finals. In June, she represented Ukraine as part of the senior group at the 2025 European Championships in Tallinn, Estonia, and finished 8th in group all-around. Together with Polina Karika and Taisiia Onofriichuk they won silver medal in team competition. They won another silver in 3 Balls + 2 Hoops final.

In 2026, she competed at Thiais Grand Prix and took 10th place in all-around. She qualified to ball final, finishing on 5th place. On May 15-17, she competed at Portimao World Challenge Cup and took 11th place in all-around. In finals, she finished 4th with ball and 6th with clubs. In July, she competed at Milan World Cup and took 23rd place in all-around. In September, she finished on 8th place in all-around at Brno Grand Prix.

== Routine music information ==
Year	Apparatus	Music title
2026	Hoop	HOPE by NF
2026	Ball	All Alone by Geir Rönning
2026	Clubs	Twisted Fairytales by Joni Fuller
2026	Ribbon	Say Something by A Great Big World, Christina Aguilera
2024/2025	Hoop	The Darklands / Growing Up Londinium by Daniel Pemberton
2024/2025	Ball	All Alone by Geir Rönning
2024/2025	Clubs	Twisted Fairytales by Joni Fuller
2024/2025	Ribbon	Asturias by Joja Wendt
