= Polina Karika =

Ukrainian rhythmic gymnast (born 2005)

- Поліна Каріка
- Born: 25 June 2005 (age 21) Zaporizhzhia, Ukraine
- Height: 172 cm (5 ft 8 in)

Gymnastics career
- Discipline: Rhythmic gymnastics
- Country represented: Ukraine; (2020-)
- Club: Deriugina School
- Head coach: Irina Deriugina
- Assistant coach: Diana Kolokot
- Choreographer: Iryna Blokhina
Medal record
Rhythmic Gymnastics
Representing Ukraine
Event	1st	2nd	3rd
World Championships	0	0	1
European Championships	0	2	0
Grand Prix Final	1	2	3
Junior European Championships	2	0	0
Total	3	4	4
World Championships
Bronze medal – third place	2025 Rio de Janeiro	Team
European Championships
Silver medal – second place	2023 Baku	Team
Silver medal – second place	2025 Tallinn	Team
Grand Prix Final
Gold medal – first place	2025 Brno	Clubs
Silver medal – second place	2025 Brno	Ball
Silver medal – second place	2026 Brno	Hoop
Bronze medal – third place	2025 Brno	All-Around
Bronze medal – third place	2025 Brno	Hoop
Bronze medal – third place	2026 Brno	Ball
Junior European Championships
Gold medal – first place	2020 Kyiv	Team
Gold medal – first place	2020 Kyiv	Ball

Polina Yevheniyivna Karika (Ukrainian: Поліна Євгеніївна Каріка; born 25 June 2005) is a Ukrainian rhythmic gymnast. She is the 2020 Junior European champion with Ball.She is Taisiia Onofriichuk's teammate.

== Personal life ==
Her brother, Dmytro Karika, is a football player at FC Viktoria 1889 Berlin.

== Career ==
=== Junior ===
She won bronze medal in Team competition at the 2020 Deriugina Cup. She competed at the 2020 Junior European Championships and won gold medal in Team competition. She also qualified to Ball final and won another gold medal.

=== Senior ===
==== 2021 ====
Karika became age-eligible for senior international competitions in 2021. She made her World Cup debut at Baku World Cup and took 32nd place in all-around. She won bronze medal in all-around at Ukrainian Championships that year.

==== 2022 ====
Polina started the season at Sofia World Cup, ending on 14th place in all-around. She competed at the 2022 European Championships in Tel Aviv, Israel, and finished 8th in the team competition with Viktoriia Onopriienko and the senior group. She took 28th place in ribbon Qualifications. She was selected to represent Ukraine at the 2022 World Games in Birmingham alongside Viktoriia Onopriienko. She only qualified to ribbon final, where she finished on 8th place.

She then represented Ukraine at the World Championships in Sofia, Bulgaria - her first World Championships. She finished 29th in the all-around qualifications and did not advance into any apparatus finals. She was a part of Ukrainian team that finished 4th.

==== 2023 ====
In 2023, she competed at Palaio Faliro World Cup in March. She took 5th place in all-around and qualified to her first World Cup apparatus finals. She was 4th in clubs, 5th in hoop and 7th in ball final. She represented Ukraine at the 2023 European Championships together with Viktoriia Onopriienko and Polina Horodnycha. They won a silver medal in the team competition together with the senior group (Yelyzaveta Azza, Diana Baieva, Daryna Duda, Yeva Meleshchuk, Anastasiya Voznyak, Mariia Vysochanska). Karika finished in 5th place in the all-around and failed to qualify to apparatus finals. She won silver medal in all-around at Ukrainian Championships. In August, she competed at the 2023 World Championships in Valencia, Spain. She placed 25th in the all-around qualifications and missed all-around final for one place. She and her teammates took 6th place in team competition.

==== 2025 ====
In 2025, Polina began her season by competing at the Miss Valentine Grand Prix in Tartu in March. She won silver medal in all-around competition behind her teammate Taisiia Onofriichuk and qualified for three apparatus finals, winning gold in ball and silver in clubs and ribbon. On March 22-23, she competed at Grand Prix Marbella and took 7th place in all-around. She won bronze medal in ball final and took 7th place in hoop. In the end of May, she won silver medal in all-around at Ukrainian Championships behind Taisiia Onofriichuk.

In June, Karika competed at the 2025 European Championships in Tallinn, Estonia together with Taisiia Onofriichuk. They won a silver medal in the team competition together with the senior group (Yelyzaveta Azza, Diana Baieva, Anastasiia Ikan, Valeriia Peremeta, Kira Shyrykina, Oleksandra Yushchak). She also took 10th place in all-around final and 4th place in clubs final. In July, she competed at the Milan World Cup, where she took 13th place in the all-around and 4th place in hoop final. On July 25-27, she competed at the Cluj-Napoca World Challenge Cup and finished 13th in the all-around. She took 6th place in ball final.

In August, she competed at the 2025 World Championships in Rio de Janeiro, Brazil. She took 11th place in all-around final. Together with Taisiia Onofriichuk and senior group she won bronze medal in team competition. She qualified to ball final only, ending on 8th place. In September, she won bronze medal in all-around behind Taisiia Onofriichuk and Tara Dragas at Brno Grand Prix. She won silver in ball and bronze in hoop final.

==== 2026 ====
Karika started her 2026 season competing at Tartu Grand Prix, taking 10th place in all-around and 8th in ball final. In March, she competed at Sofia World Cup, finishing 15th in all-around. In early April, she took 5th place in all-around at Thiais Grand Prix. She was also 4th in both hoop and clubs finals. Next, she competed at Baku World Cup, where she ended on 14th place in all-around. In the end of May, she competed at the 2026 European Championships in Varna, Bulgaria. She ended on 20th place in all-around final and was 9th in team competition together with Onofriichuk and senior group.

In August, she was selected to represent Ukraine alongside Taisiia Onofriichuk at the 2026 World Championships in Frankfurt. Together with senior group they took 5th place in team competition. She took 23rd place in all-around qualifications, and did not advance into the all-around final. In September, she finished on 4th place in all-around at Brno Grand Prix. She also won silver medal in hoop and bronze in ball final.

== Routine music information ==
Year	Apparatus	Music title
2026	Hoop	Can You See Me by Power-Haus
2026	Ball	
2026	Clubs	Feeling Good by Michael Bublé
2026	Ribbon	Confessa by Adriano Celentano
2025	Hoop	The Plot Thickens / Dead Reckoning Openin Titles (from Mission: Impossible – Dead Reckoning Part One) by Lorne Balfe
2025	Ball	Caruso by Luciano Pavarotti
2025	Clubs	Feeling Good by Michael Bublé
2025	Ribbon	Tico-Tico by K.T. Sullivan
2023	Hoop	
2023	Ball	I Will Always Love You by Whitney Houston
2023	Clubs	
2023	Ribbon	

== See also ==
- List of medalists at the Rhythmic Gymnastics Junior European Championships
