= Diana Baieva =

Ukrainian rhythmic gymnast

- Full name: Diana Artemivna Baieva
- Born: 9 August 2004 (age 22) Makiivka, Ukraine

Gymnastics career
- Discipline: Rhythmic gymnastics
- Country represented: Ukraine
- Training location: Kyiv, Ukraine
- Club: Deriugina School
- Head coach: Irina Deriugina
- Assistant coach: Albina Deriugina
Medal record
Rhythmic Gymnastics
Representing Ukraine
Event	1st	2nd	3rd
World Championships	1	0	2
European Championships	2	4	2
FIG World Cup	0	0	5
Total	3	4	9
World Championships
Gold medal – first place	2025 Rio de Janeiro	3 Balls + 2 Hoops
Bronze medal – third place	2023 Valencia	3 Ribbons + 2 Balls
Bronze medal – third place	2025 Rio de Janeiro	Team
European Championships
Gold medal – first place	2020 Kyiv	Team
Gold medal – first place	2020 Kyiv	5 Balls
Silver medal – second place	2023 Baku	Team
Silver medal – second place	2020 Kyiv	3 Hoops + 4 Clubs
Silver medal – second place	2025 Tallinn	Team
Silver medal – second place	2025 Tallinn	3 Balls + 2 Hoops
Bronze medal – third place	2020 Kyiv	Group all-around
Bronze medal – third place	2024 Budapest	3 Ribbon + 2 Balls
European Cup
Bronze medal – third place	2026 Baku	3 Hoop + 4 Clubs

Diana Artemivna Baieva (Ukrainian: Діана Артемівна Баєва; born 9 August 2004) is a Ukrainian group rhythmic gymnast. She won a bronze medal at the 2023 World Championships in 3 ribbons and 2 balls. She won two gold medals, a silver medal, and a bronze medal at the 2020 European Championships. She also won a silver medal at the 2023 European Championships and a bronze medal at the 2024 European Championships. She represented Ukraine at the 2024 Summer Olympics and finished seventh in the group all-around.

== Early life ==
Baieva was born in Makiivka. She began rhythmic gymnastics when she was six. In 2015, she moved to Vinnytsia with her family due to the Russo-Ukrainian War. Three years later, she auditioned for the Ukrainian national team and moved to Kyiv.

== Career ==
Baieva was part of the junior Ukrainian group that finished 16th in the all-around at the 2019 Junior World Championships in Moscow.

=== 2020–21 ===
In 2020, Baieva joined the senior national group and competed at the 2020 European Championships in Kyiv. The senior group won a team gold medal alongside the junior individuals. In the group finals, Ukraine won the bronze medal in the all-around behind Israel and Azerbaijan. They then won gold in the 5 balls final and silver behind Turkey in 3 hoops and 4 clubs.

Baieva competed with the Ukrainian group at the 2021 World Championships in Kitakyushu, Japan. They finished eighth in the group all-around and qualified for the 3 hoops and 4 clubs final, where they finished seventh. Additionally, they finished fourth in the combined team rankings alongside the individual gymnasts.

=== 2022–23 ===
Baieva and the Ukrainian group finished tenth in the all-around and sixth in the 5 hoops final at the 2022 European Championships. Then at the 2022 World Championships in Sofia, Bulgaria, they finished 12th in the group all-around.

In February 2023, Baieva competed with the Ukrainian group at the Tartu Grand Prix where they swept the gold medals. They won a bronze medal in 5 hoops at the Baku World Cup. Then at the 2023 European Championships, the Ukrainian group won a silver medal in the team event alongside the individual gymnasts. Baieva and the Ukrainian group finished fourth in the all-around and qualified for both event finals. They finished sixth in 5 hoops and fourth in 3 ribbons and 2 balls. At the 2023 World Championships, the Ukrainian group finished fifth in the all-around and qualified for both event finals. They finished seventh in the 5 hoops final, and they won the bronze medal in 3 ribbons and 2 balls.

=== 2024 ===
Baieva competed with the Ukrainian group at the 2024 European Championships in Budapest. The group finished sixth in the all-around and fifth in the 5 hoops final. They then won the bronze medal in the 3 ribbons and 2 balls final. Then in July, the group won two bronze medals at the 2024 Cluj-Napoca World Challenge Cup, in the all-around and 3 ribbons and 2 balls.

Baieva represented Ukraine at the 2024 Summer Olympics alongside Alina Melnyk, Mariia Vysochanska, Valeriia Peremeta, and Kira Shyrykina. The group qualified for the all-around final in third place, including having the highest score in 3 ribbons and 2 balls. Then in the all-around final, the group sat in second place after the 5 hoops, but after several major mistakes in 3 ribbons and 2 balls, the group dropped to seventh place. Baieva noted after the competition that the group "couldn't cope with the stress" of being in medal position.

=== 2025 ===
She was part of the group that competed at the 2025 European Championships in Tallinn, Estonia, and finished 8th in group all-around. Together with Polina Karika and Taisiia Onofriichuk they won silver medal in team competition. They won another silver in 3 Balls + 2 Hoops final.

In late August, Diana was selected to represent Ukraine alongside Yelyzaveta Azza, Valeriia Peremeta, Kira Shyrykina, Nadiia Yurina and Oleksandra Yushchak at the 2025 World Championships in Rio de Janeiro, Brazil. They took 9th place in group all-around and won bronze medal in team competition together with Polina Karika and Taisiia Onofriichuk. They won a gold medal in 3 balls + 2 hoops final, second-ever gold medal in the group event for Ukraine and the first since the 2002 World Championships.

=== 2026 ===
In 2026 Baieva and her teammates Oleksandra Yushchak, Valeriia Peremeta, Yelyzaveta Azza, Kira Shyrykina and Polina Horodnycha competed at Tartu Grand Prix, winning gold medal in group all-around and 5 balls and bronze medal in 3 hoops + 4 clubs final. In March, they were 7th in all-around and 6th in 5 Balls final at Sofia World Cup. In April, they competed at Baku World Cup, and took 13th place in all-around. In early May, the group competed at European Cup in Baku, and won bronze medal in 3 Hoops + 4 Clubs. They took 5th place in 5 Balls.

On May 27-31, she competed at the 2026 European Championships in Varna, Bulgaria, alongside Oleksandra Yushchak, Valeriia Peremeta, Kira Shyrykina, Taisiia Redka and Polina Horodnycha. They took 7th place in all-around, 9th place in team competition with Polina Karika and Taisiia Onofriichuk, and 4th place in mixed apparatus final. In June, they took 14th place in all-around at the World Challenge Cup Cluj-Napoca, after big mistakes in both routines. In July, they ended on 6th place in all-around at Milan World Cup and won bronze medal in 3 Hoops + 4 Clubs final.
