= Wang Zihan =

Chinese rhythmic gymnast

- 王籽涵
- Born: Sichuan, China

Gymnastics career
- Discipline: Rhythmic gymnastics
- Country represented: China; (2025 – present)
- Club: Sichuan

Wang Zihan (Chinese: 王籽涵, born 2006) is a Chinese rhythmic gymnast.

== Career ==
She took bronze medal in all-around at the 2023 Chinese National Championships. She repeated that success next year again.

In 2025 Wang made her international debut. In April, she made her World Cup debut at Sofia World Cup, placing 51st in all-around. At Baku World Cup, she took 24th place in all-around. Her best result was with ball (15th place). She was 16th in all-around at Tashkent World Cup, just nearly missing a final with ribbon (9th place). In July, she competed at Milan World Cup and took 34th place in all-around. In August, she was chosen to represent China alongside Wang Zilu at the 2025 World Championships in Rio de Janeiro, Brazil, as a debutant. She finished 38th in all-around qualifications and 11th in team competition.

In 2026, she competed at Milan World Cup and took 43rd place in all-around.

== Routine music information ==
Year	Apparatus	Music Title
2025	Hoop	Mission: Impossible by Dubdogz, Zuffo, Rhōden
2025	Ball	Can't Take My Eyes off You by Morten Harket
2025	Clubs	
2025	Ribbon	Preeminence by Audiomachine
