= Viktoriia Onopriienko =

Ukrainian rhythmic gymnast

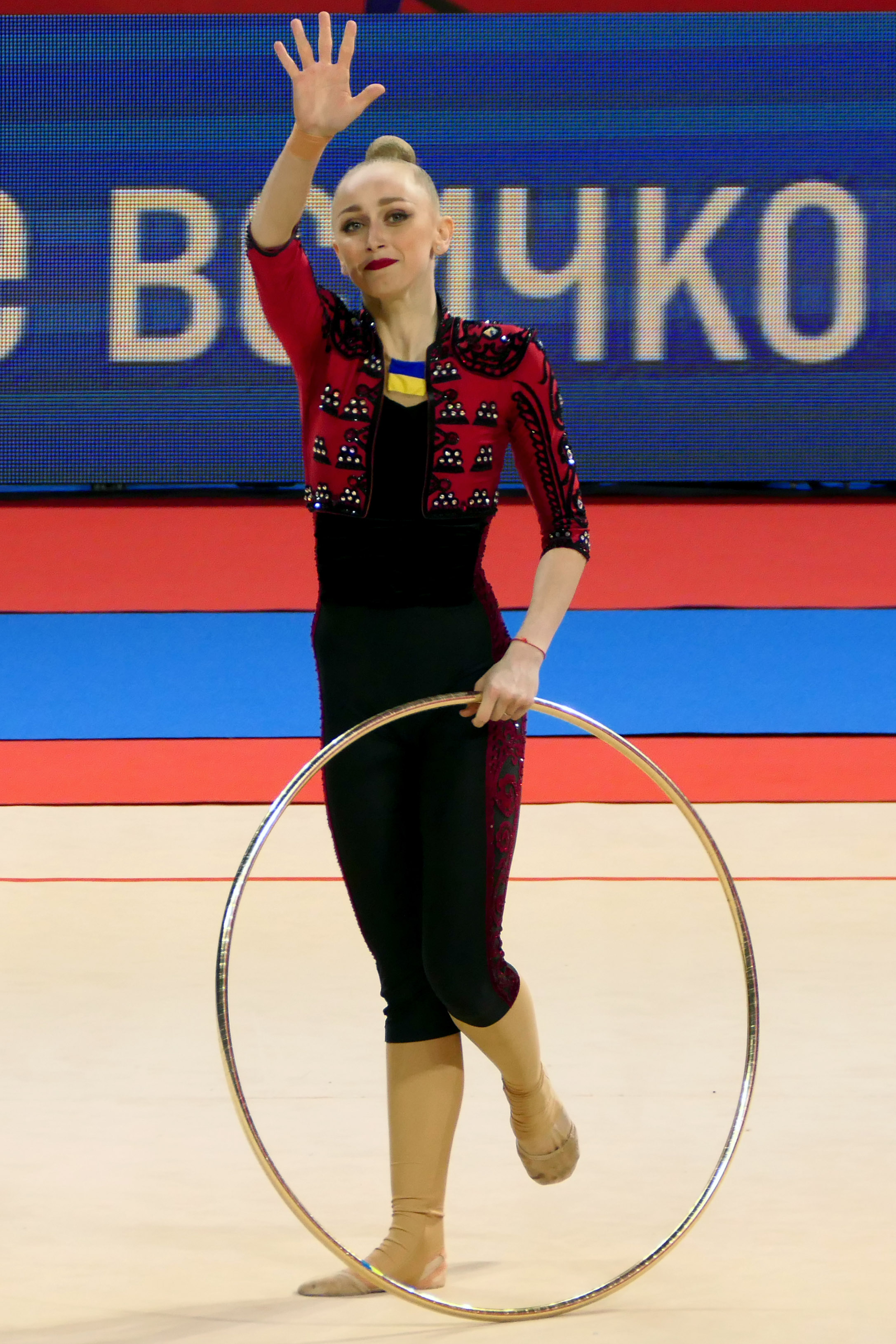
- Onopriienko in 2024

Personal information
- Full name: Viktoriia Maksimivna Onopriienko
- Alternative name: Victoria Onoprienko
- Nickname: Vika
- Born: 18 October 2003 (age 23) Kyiv, Ukraine
- Height: 160 cm (5 ft 3 in)

Gymnastics career
- Discipline: Rhythmic gymnastics
- Country represented: Ukraine; (2016-2024)
- Head coach: Irina Deriugina
- Assistant coach: Olena Dmytrash
Medal record
Representing Ukraine
Rhythmic Gymnastics
Event	1st	2nd	3rd
World Championships	0	0	1
European Championships	1	1	0
World Games	0	0	1
Junior European Championships	0	1	0
Grand Prix	13	7	7
World Cup	2	2	3
Gymnasiade	3	2	0
Total	19	13	12
World Championships
Bronze medal – third place	2023 Valencia	Clubs
European Championships
Gold medal – first place	2023 Baku	Hoop
Silver medal – second place	2023 Baku	Team
World Games
Bronze medal – third place	2022 Birmingham	Ribbon
Junior European Championships
Silver medal – second place	2018 Guadalajara	Team
Grand Prix Final
Gold medal – first place	2020 Kyiv	All-around
Gold medal – first place	2020 Kyiv	Hoop
Gold medal – first place	2024 Brno	Hoop
Gold medal – first place	2024 Brno	Clubs
Silver medal – second place	2020 Kyiv	Ribbon
Silver medal – second place	2021 Marbella	All-around
Silver medal – second place	2021 Marbella	Ribbon
Bronze medal – third place	2019 Brno	Clubs
Bronze medal – third place	2021 Marbella	Hoop
Bronze medal – third place	2021 Marbella	Clubs
Bronze medal – third place	2024 Brno	All-around
Bronze medal – third place	2024 Brno	Ball
Summer Gymnasiade
Gold medal – first place	2018 Marrakech	Clubs
Gold medal – first place	2018 Marrakech	Hoop
Gold medal – first place	2018 Marrakech	Ball
Silver medal – second place	2018 Marrakech	All-around
Silver medal – second place	2018 Marrakech	Ribbon

Viktoriia Maksimivna Onopriienko (Ukrainian: Вікторія Максимівна Онопрієнко; born 18 October 2003) is a Ukrainian individual rhythmic gymnast. She competed at the 2020 Tokyo Olympics, finishing tenth in the all-around final. She is the bronze medalist in clubs at the 2023 World Championships and the hoop champion at the 2023 European Championships. Onopriienko is also the 2020 Grand Prix Final all-around champion and the 2022 World Games ribbon bronze medalist. At the junior level, she is the 2018 European team silver medalist.

On national level, she is a two-time (2021, 2023) Ukrainian all-around champion and the 2020 all-around silver medalist.

== Early life ==
Onopriienko was born on 18 October 2003 in Kyiv. Her parents are both dental technicians. She began rhythmic gymnastics at age four, and she also tried figure skating for three months.

== Career ==
=== Junior ===
Onopriienko competed at the 2018 European Championships, winning team silver alongside Khrystyna Pohranychna and the Ukrainian senior group.

=== Senior ===
==== 2019 ====
Onopriienko participated in her first World Cup in Pesaro, where she finished in ninth place all-around and qualified for the ball, ribbon, and clubs finals, finishing seventh in ball and ribbon, and fourth in clubs. Then at the Sofia World Cup, she finished fourteenth in the all-around. She again finished fourteenth in the all-around at the Baku World Cup and qualified to ball and clubs finals, finishing sixth and fourth, respectively. She competed at the 2019 European Championships in Baku, where she, Vlada Nikolchenko, and the junior group placed fifth in team competition. She did not advance into the all-around or apparatus finals. Then at the Minsk World Challenge Cup, she finished fourteenth in the all-around and seventh in the clubs final. She was scheduled to compete in two events in the qualification round of the World Championships, but she was taken out at the last minute.

==== 2020 ====
In September, Onopriienko competed at Deriugina Grand Prix Final in Kyiv, where she won all-around gold ahead of Belarusian gymnasts Alina Harnasko and Anastasiia Salos. In the event finals, she won the gold medal in the hoop and the silver medal in the ribbon behind Harnasko. She then tied for the silver medal in all-around with Yeva Meleshchuk, behind Vlada Nikolchenko, at the Ukrainian Championships in Uzhhorod.

==== 2021: Olympic year ====
Onopriienko competed at the Sofia World Cup, finishing sixth in the all-around and ball and fifth in clubs. At the Tashkent World Cup, she ranked thirteenth all-around and sixth in the ribbon final. Then at the Baku World Cup she was fifteenth in the all-around and eighth in the ball final. At the Ukrainian Championships, she won her first national all-around title.. She finished fourteenth in the all-around at the Pesaro World Cup.

Onopriienko competed at her first senior European Championships in Varna, Bulgaria. She and her Ukrainian teammates Khrystyna Pohranychna and Vlada Nikolchenko and the senior group placed fifth in the team competition. Individually, she qualified for the all-around final where she finished eleventh. She qualified for the hoop and clubs event finals where she finished eighth and seventh respectively. She then participated in the Tel Aviv Grand Prix, where she finished sixth place all-around, eighth in the hoop final, and fourth in the ball and clubs finals.

Onopriienko and Khrystyna Pohranychna were selected as the individual rhythmic gymnasts representing Ukraine at the postponed 2020 Olympic Games in Tokyo. Onopriienko was the youngest individual rhythmic gymnast competing. She qualified for the all-around final in ninth place, and her compatriot Pohranychna qualified as well. In the all-around final, she finished tenth.

After the Olympics, she competed at the Marbella Grand Prix Final, where she placed second all-around behind Russian gymnast Lala Kramarenko. In the apparatus finals, she won the silver medal in ribbon, the bronze in hoop and clubs, and finished in seventh place in ball. She then competed at the World Championships in Kitakyushu, Japan. She qualified for the hoop and finals where she finished eighth and the ball final where she finished seventh. She then competed in the all-around final and finished in fifth place, and Ukraine placed fourth in the team competition.

==== 2022 ====
Onopriienko had to leave Ukraine and live and train in Italy in March due to the Russian invasion of Ukraine. In April, she won her first FIG World Cup medal at the Sofia World Cup- a bronze in the ribbon final. Then in June, she won her first World Cup title by beating Sofia Raffaeli in the ribbon final at the Pesaro World Cup. She then competed at the European Championships where she finished eighth in the all-around and fifth in the hoop final.

Onopriienko was selected to represent Ukraine at the 2022 World Games alongside Polina Karika. She qualified for the hoop final where she finished eighth and won the bronze medal in the ribbon final. This marked the first time a Ukrainian rhythmic gymnast won a medal at the World Games since 2013. She then competed at the World Championships in Sofia, Bulgaria. She finished fourth in the all-around and ball finals and sixth in the clubs final, and the Ukrainian team also finished fourth.

==== 2023 ====
In April, she won silver medal in the clubs final at the Baku World Cup. She represented Ukraine at the 2023 European Championships together with Polina Karika and Polina Horodnycha. They won a silver medal in the team competition together with the senior group (Yelyzaveta Azza, Diana Baieva, Daryna Duda, Yeva Meleshchuk, Anastasiya Voznyak, Mariia Vysochanska). Onopriienko finished in 14th place in the all-around final and qualified to all four apparatus finals. She won a gold medal in hoop, placed 4th in both ball and clubs, and was 6th in the ribbon final.

In July, she won gold in ribbon and silver in the hoop final at Milan World Cup. In August, she competed at the 2023 World Championships in Valencia, Spain. She placed 7th in the all-around final and won a spot for Ukraine at the Paris Olympics. She also qualified to the clubs final and won her first ever World Championship medal, a bronze behind Darja Varfolomeev and Boryana Kaleyn.

==== 2024: Olympic controversies ====
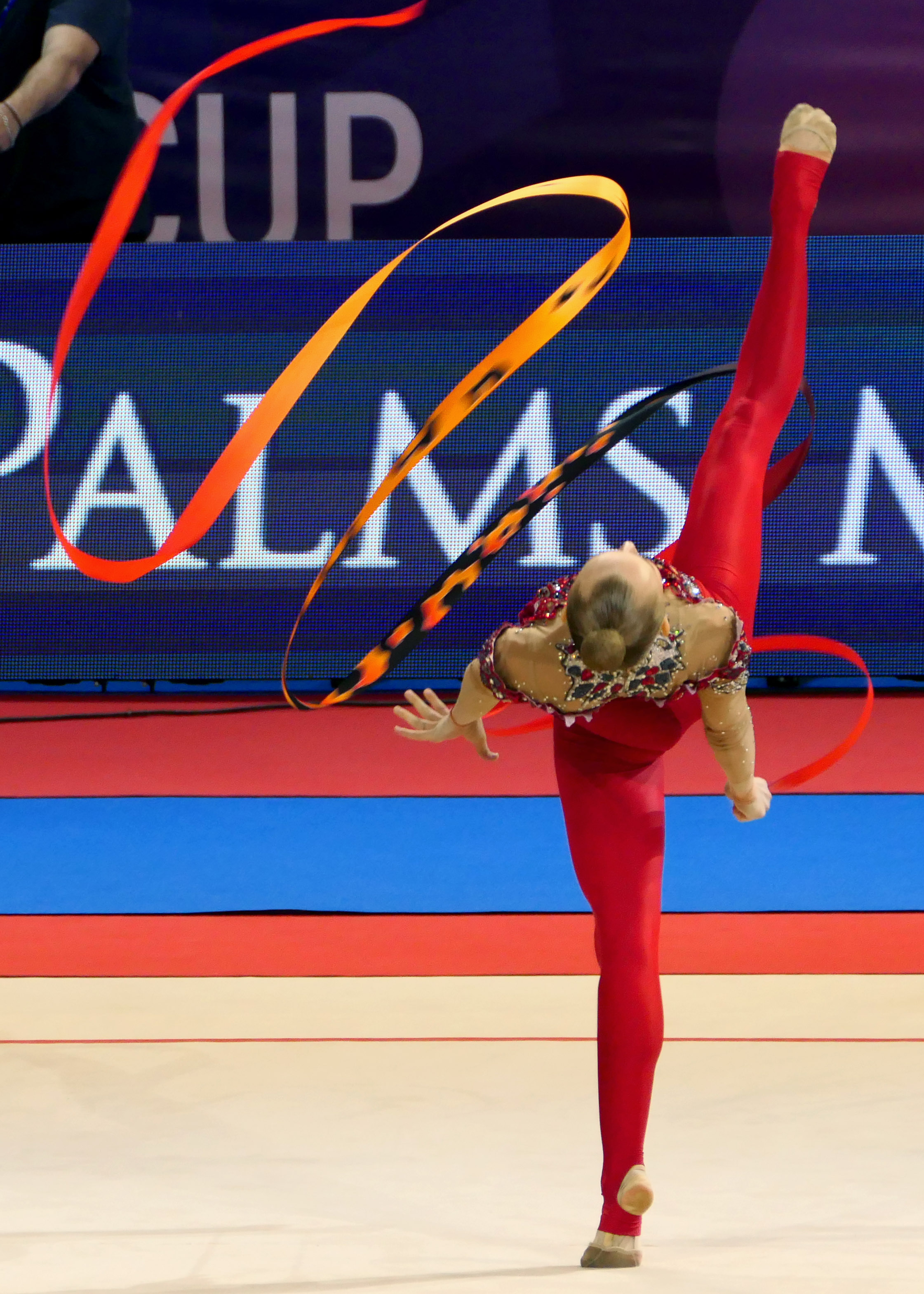
Onopriienko performing with ribbon at the 2024 Sofia World Cup

Onopriienko started the competition season in February, at the Tartu Grand Prix, where she won the gold medal in the all-around in front of Elvira Krasnobaeva and teammate Taisiia Onofriichuk. She also won three golds in the hoop, ball and ribbon finals and silver in clubs. At the Thiais Grand Prix, she was 5th place in the all-around and won two gold medals in the apparatus finals (hoop and ball). On 12–14 April, she competed at the Sofia World Cup and finished in 10th place in the all-around. She qualified to three event finals. She placed 7th in the hoop final and 4th in the ribbon final, and she won a bronze medal in the club's final.

In April 2024, the Olympic Channel released a documentary about Onopriienko's 2023 gymnastics season, titled Viktoriia: Ukraine's Gymnastics Hope.

At the 2024 European Championships in Budapest, Hungary, Onopriienko failed to qualify to the all-around final after finishing 26th in the all-around qualifications. Her best result was 11th with hoop, and she did not advance into any apparatus finals. She took the bronze medal in the all-around at the Brno Grand Prix in June, and she also won gold medals in the hoop and clubs finals and bronze in the ball final.

Although Onopriienko had won Ukraine's Olympic spot at the 2023 World Championships, it was not nominative, and she was not selected to compete at the 2024 Summer Olympics in Paris. The national team coach, Irina Deriugina, said that this decision was influenced by the consistent performances of 16-year-old Taisiia Onofriichuk, who was selected for the spot on the Olympic team. She also mentioned Onopriienko needing to recover from injury, which had caused her to miss a month of training, though Onopriienko said that her injury was not serious. The controversy surrounding the selection process sparked mixed reactions from fans, with some supporting Onopriienko and others justifying the choice of Onofriichuk due to her recent successes, including a bronze medal at the pre-Olympic European Championship.

At the end of the year, Onopriienko's gymnastics license was set to "retired", although she did not make an announcement about her future plans.

== Personal life ==
Onopriienko enjoys cooking and would like to open her own restaurant in the future. She is studying at National University of Ukraine on Physical Education and Sport in Kyiv.

Onopriienko's older brother Serhiy died in June 2022 fighting as a member of the Armed Forces of Ukraine during the Russian invasion of Ukraine. Her father has also served in the Ukrainian military since the invasion, and Onopriienko has been active in charity efforts to support the military.

== Routine music information ==
Year	Apparatus	Music title
2018	Hoop	"My Way" by Andre Rieu
2018	Ball	"Fever" by Peggy Lee
2018	Clubs	"Canto Elvolvente" / ??? by Carrapicho
2018	Ribbon	"Velocity" by Nathan Lanier
2019	Hoop	"Dance of The Comedians" by The Manhattan Pops
2019	Ball	"Fever" by Peggy Lee
2019	Clubs	"Shaman's Dance" by Rishi & Harshil
2019	Ribbon	"Dreams" by ZHU & NERO
2020	Hoop (first)	"Dance of The Comedians" by The Manhattan Pops
2020	Hoop (second)	?
2020	Ball (first)	"Fever" by Peggy Lee
2020	Ball (second)	"Smooth Criminal" by Michael Jackson
2020	Clubs	"Shaman's Dance" by Rishi & Harshil
2020	Ribbon	"Dreams" by ZHU & NER
2021	Hoop (first)	"Giselle" by Adolphe Charles Adam
2021	Hoop (second)	"Fascination by Richard Hayman Symphony Orchestra
2021	Hoop (third)	"Who Wants To Live Forever?" by David Garrett
2021	Ball	"Smooth Criminal" by Michael Jackson
2021	Clubs	"Back in Black" by Sershen & Zaritskaya
2021	Ribbon (first)	"The House Always Wins" by Christophe Beck
2021	Ribbon (second)	"Tetsujin" by Juno Reactor & Don Davis
2022	Hoop	"Good News" by Apashe
2022	Ball (first)	"Beggin'" by Måneskin
2022	Ball (second)	"Crazy" by 2WEI
2022	Clubs (first)	"Die Another Day" by Madonna
2022	Clubs (second)	"They Don't Care About Us" (Immortal Version) by Michael Jackson
2022	Ribbon	"Orchis: I.Introduction-New Creation" by Sonya Belousova
2023	Hoop	"Prelude" from Carmen, by Georges Bizet
2023	Ball (first)	"Jailhouse Rock" by Elvis Presley
2023	Ball (second)	"Oy U Luzi Chervona Kalyna" (feat. BoomBox) [Army Remix] by The Kiffness
2023	Clubs	"They Don't Care About Us" (Immortal Version) by Michael Jackson
2023	Ribbon	"Orchis: I.Introduction-New Creation" by Sonya Belousova
2024	Hoop	"Prelude" from Carmen, by Georges Bizet
2024	Ball	Can You See Me - Shyloom Remix by Power-Haus, Duomo, Shyloom
2024	Clubs	Fergalicious by Fergie
2024	Ribbon	I Was Made for Lovin' You by Kiss

== Representation in other media ==
- Viktoriia: Ukraine’s Gymnastics Hope (2024) is a IOC documentary film made about Onoprienko and her way to the 2024 Summer Olympics.

== Detailed Olympic results ==
Year	Competition Description	Location	Music	Apparatus	Rank-Final	Score-Final	Rank-Qualifying	Score-Qualifying
2020	Olympic Games	Tokyo		All-around	10th	93.350	9th	95.450
2020	Olympic Games	Tokyo	"Giselle" by Adolphe Charles Adam	Hoop	9th	24.000	10th	23.800
2020	Olympic Games	Tokyo	"Smooth Criminal" by Michael Jackson	Ball	9th	23.550	11th	24.300
2020	Olympic Games	Tokyo	"Back in Black" by Sershen & Zaritskaya	Clubs	7th	26.100	5th	26.100
2020	Olympic Games	Tokyo	"The House Always Wins" by Christophe Beck	Ribbon	9th	19.700	6th	21.250

== See also ==
- List of medalists at the Rhythmic Gymnastics Junior European Championships
