= Nadiia Yurina =

Ukrainian rhythmic gymnast (born 2008)

- Born: 30 September 2008 (age 17) Poltava, Ukraine

Gymnastics career
- Discipline: Rhythmic gymnastics
- Country represented: Ukraine (2023–)
- Training location: Kyiv, Ukraine
- Club: Deriugins School
- Head coach: Irina Deriugina
- Choreographer: Iryna Blokhina
Medal record
Rhythmic Gymnastics
Representing Ukraine
European Cup
Silver medal – second place	2025 Baku	3 Balls + 2 Hoops

Nadiia Yurina (born 30 September 2008) is a Ukrainian rhythmic gymnast. She represents Ukraine in international competitions.

== Career ==
=== Junior ===
In July 2023 Yurina was selected for the 2nd editions of the Junior World Championships in Cluj-Napoca as part of the national group. There, along Natalia Denysova, Sofiia Kuts, Milana Makhortova, Uma Shamilova and Kira Shyrykina, she took 4th place in the All-Around, in teams and in both event finals.

=== Senior ===
In 2025 she entered the senior group, debuting at the World Cup in Baku being 8th with 5 ribbons and 4th with 3 balls & 2 hoops, winning bronze in the All-Around. In May, competing at the European Cup stage in Baku along Yelyzaveta Azza, Valeriia Peremeta, Kira Shyyrkina, Anastasiia Ikan and Oleksandra Yushchak, she won bronze in the All-Around and silver with 3 balls & 2 hoops.
