= Polina Horodnycha =

Ukrainian rhythmic gymnast (born 2005)

- Born: 16 December 2005 (age 20) Odesa Oblast, Ukraine

Gymnastics career
- Discipline: Rhythmic gymnastics
- Country represented: Ukraine; (2020-2026)
- Club: Chornomorets Rhythmic Gymnastics Youth Sports School of Olympic Reserve
- Head coach: Iryna Deriuhina
- Assistant coaches: Antonina Lipkina, Maryna Kardash
- Retired: 2026
Medal record
Rhythmic Gymnastics
Representing Ukraine
| Event | 1st | 2nd | 3rd |
|---|---|---|---|
| European Championships | 0 | 1 | 0 |
| FIG World Cup | 0 | 0 | 1 |
| Total | 0 | 1 | 1 |
European Championships
| Silver medal – second place | 2023 Baku | Team |
Grand Prix Final
| Silver medal – second place | 2023 Brno | Clubs |
| Silver medal – second place | 2023 Brno | Ribbon |
| Bronze medal – third place | 2023 Brno | All-around |
European Cup
| Bronze medal – third place | 2026 Baku | 3 Hoop + 4 Clubs |

Polina Horodnycha (Ukrainian: Поліна Городнича; born 16 December 2005 in Odesa Oblast) is a Ukrainian retired rhythmic gymnast. She is the 2023 European Championships silver medalist in the team competition.

== Career ==
=== Individual ===
In December 2021, Horodnycha received the title of Candidate for Master of Sport.

Horodnycha made her Worlds debut at the 2022 World Championships in Sofia, Bulgaria, where she finished 19th in the ribbon qualification.

During the 2023 season, she won the bronze medal in the all-round and ribbon final at the Miss Valentine Tartu Grand Prix in Estonia. In March, she competed at Marbella Grand Prix, where she won a bronze medal in the clubs final. She also competed at the Palaio Faliro World Cup, where she ended in 24th place in the all-around.

In May, she represented Ukraine at the 2023 European Championships in Baku, Azerbaijan, alongside Viktoriia Onopriienko and Polina Karika. Together with the senior group, they won the silver medal in the team competition. Horodnycha competed with ribbon only, taking 11th place in qualifications. In June, she competed at the Brno Grand Prix, winning the bronze medal in the all-around and silver medals in the clubs and ribbon finals.

In 2024, she competed at the Brno Grand Prix in June, taking 9th place in the all-around.

In 2025, she competed at the 2025 Summer Universiade in Essen and took 9th place in the individual all-around. After qualifying to two apparatus finals, she took 7th place with ribbon and 8th place with clubs.

=== Group ===
In 2026, Horodnycha joined Ukrainian national senior group. Together with her teammates Oleksandra Yushchak, Valeriia Peremeta, Yelyzaveta Azza, Kira Shyrykina and Diana Baieva, she debuted at the Tartu Grand Prix in February. They won the gold medal in the group all-around and the 5 balls final and bronze in the 3 hoops + 4 clubs final. In March, they were 7th in all-around and 6th in the 5 balls final at the Sofia World Cup. In April, they competed at Baku World Cup and took 13th place in the all-around.

In early May, the group competed at the European Cup in Baku, and they won bronze in 3 hoops + 4 clubs. They took 5th place in the 5 balls final. On May 27-31, she competed at the 2026 European Championships in Varna, Bulgaria, with teammate Peremeta replaced by Taisiia Redka. They took 7th place in the all-around, 9th place in the team competition with individuals Polina Karika and Taisiia Onofriichuk, and 4th place in the mixed apparatus final. In June, they took 14th place in the all-around at the World Challenge Cup Cluj-Napoca after big mistakes in both routines. In July, they ended in 6th place in the all-around at the Milan World Cup and won a bronze medal in the3 hoops + 4 clubs final. She was selected to represent Ukraine alongside her teammates, with Azza replaced by Peremeta, at the 2026 World Championships in Frankfurt, Germany. They took 5th place in the group all-around and 5th place in the team competition alongside Taisiia Onofriichuk and Polina Karika. They were 4th in 5 balls and 8th in the 3 hoops + 4 clubs final.

She announced her retirement in September that year.

== Routine music information ==
| Year | Apparatus | Music title |
|---|---|---|
| 2025 | Hoop | Horror Trailer by FreshmanSound |
| 2025 | Ball | Beat It by Michael Jackson |
| 2025 | Clubs | Innuendo by Queen |
| 2025 | Ribbon | Serpent Dream by Mike Oldfield |
| 2023 | Hoop | Romani Holiday (Antonius Remix) by Hans Zimmer |
| 2023 | Ball | Something's Got A Hold On Me by Etta James |
| 2023 | Clubs | Unstoppable by E.S. Posthumus |
| 2023 | Ribbon | Starvation by Thomas Bergersen |
