= Mariia Vysochanska =

Ukrainian rhythmic gymnast (born 2002)

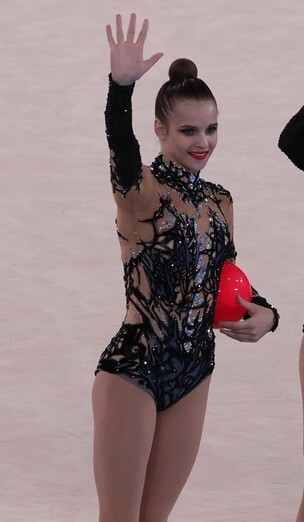
- Vysochanska at the 2020 Summer Olympics

Personal information
- Full name: Mariia Olehivna Vysochanska
- Nickname: Marichka
- Born: 10 September 2002 (age 23) Lviv, Ukraine
- Height: 175 cm (5 ft 9 in)

Gymnastics career
- Discipline: Rhythmic gymnastics
- Country represented: Ukraine (2017-2024)
- Training location: Kyiv, Ukraine
- Club: Deriugins School
- Head coach: Irina Deriugina
- Assistant coaches: Olena Dmytrash, Olena Ruda
- Retired: 28 December 2024
Medal record
World Championships
Bronze medal – third place	2023 Valencia	3 Ribbons + 2 Balls
European Championships
Gold medal – first place	2020 Kyiv	Team
Gold medal – first place	2020 Kyiv	5 Balls
Silver medal – second place	2020 Kyiv	3 Hoops + 4 Clubs
Silver medal – second place	2023 Baku	Team
Bronze medal – third place	2020 Kyiv	Group all-around
Bronze medal – third place	2024 Budapest	3 Ribbon + 2 Balls

Mariia Olehivna Vysochanska (Ukrainian: Марія Олегівна Височанська; born 10 September 2002) is a Ukrainian retired rhythmic gymnast. She represented Ukraine at the 2020 and 2024 Summer Olympics in the group all-around. She won a bronze medal at the 2023 World Championships in 3 ribbons and 2 balls. She won two gold medals, a silver medal, and a bronze medal at the 2020 European Championships. She also won a silver medal at the 2023 European Championships and a bronze medal at the 2024 European Championships.

== Early life ==
Vysochanska was born in 2002 in Lviv. She began rhythmic gymnastics when she was four years old because her mother was a rhythmic gymnast. Her father, Oleg Vysochansky, is a senior lieutenant in the Armed Forces of Ukraine and sustained a serious head injury in the Second Battle of Donetsk Airport but survived.

== Career ==
Vysochanska competed with the junior national group at the 2017 European Championships and finished eighth in the 10 clubs final. Additionally, Ukraine finished sixth in the team event.

=== 2019-21 ===
Vysochanska competed with the senior national group at the 2019 World Championships where they finished ninth in the all-around. They also qualified for the 5 balls final and finished eighth.

Vysochanska competed at the 2020 European Championships in Kyiv. The senior group won a team gold medal alongside the junior individuals. In the group finals, Ukraine won the bronze medal in the all-around behind Israel and Azerbaijan. They then won gold in the 5 balls final and silver behind Turkey in 3 hoops and 4 clubs.

Vysochanska represented Ukraine at the 2020 Summer Olympics alongside Anastasiya Voznyak, Yeva Meleshchuk, Daryna Duda, Mariola Bodnarchuk. Five months before the Olympics, Vysochanska had a serious leg injury that required surgery, but she was able to return faster than expected. The group finished seventh in the all-around final. After the Olympic Games, she competed with the Ukrainian group at the 2021 World Championships in Kitakyushu, Japan. They finished eighth in the group all-around and qualified for the 3 hoops and 4 clubs final, where they finished seventh. Additionally, they finished fourth in the combined team rankings alongside the individual gymnasts.

=== 2023 ===
In February, Vysochanska competed with the Ukrainian group at the Tartu Grand Prix where they swept the gold medals. They won a bronze medal in 5 hoops at the Baku World Cup. Then at the 2023 European Championships, the Ukrainian group won a silver medal in the team event alongside the individual gymnasts. Vysochanska and the Ukrainian group finished fourth in the all-around and qualified for both event finals. They finished sixth in 5 hoops and fourth in 3 ribbons and 2 balls. At the 2023 World Championships, the Ukrainian group finished fifth in the all-around and qualified for both event finals. They finished seventh in the 5 hoops final, and they won the bronze medal in 3 ribbons and 2 balls.

=== 2024 ===
Vysochanska and the Ukrainian group began the Olympic season at the Tartu Grand Prix where Ukraine swept the gold medals. Then at the Athens World Cup, they finished 13th in the all-around and fourth in the 5 hoops final. Then at the Sofia World Cup, they finished 10th in the all-around and seventh in the 5 hoops final. At the 2024 European Championships in Budapest, the group finished sixth in the all-around and fifth in the 5 hoops final. They then won the bronze medal in the 3 ribbons and 2 balls final behind Spain and Israel. Then in July, the group won two bronze medals at the Cluj-Napoca World Challenge Cup, in the all-around and 3 ribbons and 2 balls.

Vysochanska was invited to participate in the 2024 Summer Olympics torch relay alongside representatives from countries in the European Union. She represented Ukraine at the 2024 Summer Olympics alongside Diana Baieva, Alina Melnyk, Kira Shyrykina, and Valeriia Peremeta. The group qualified for the all-around final in third place, including having the highest score in 3 ribbons and 2 balls. Then in the all-around final, the group sat in second place after the 5 hoops, but after several major mistakes in 3 ribbons and 2 balls, the group dropped to seventh place.

Vysochanska announced her retirement from rhythmic gymnastics on 28 December 2024.
