= Taisiia Onofriichuk =

Ukrainian rhythmic gymnast (born 2008)

- Onofriichuk at the 2024 Sofia World Cup

Personal information
- Full name: Taisiia Andriivna Onofriichuk
- Alternative name: Taisia Onofriychuk
- Nickname: Taya
- Born: 26 May 2008 (age 18) Kyiv, Ukraine

Gymnastics career
- Discipline: Rhythmic gymnastics
- Country represented: Ukraine; (2021 – present)
- Club: Deriugins School
- Head coach: Irina Deriugina
- Assistant coach: Marina Kardash
- Former coach: Elina Khozlu
- Choreographer: Iryna Blokhina
- World ranking: 2 (2026 Season); 1 (2025 Season)
Medal record
Rhythmic Gymnastics
Representing Ukraine
Event	1st	2nd	3rd
World Championships	1	1	2
European Championships	1	2	4
European Cup	4	2	2
FIG World Cup	10	7	8
FIG World Challenge Cup	3	2	0
Grand Prix Final	6	4	0
Junior World Championships	0	1	0
Total	25	19	16
World Championships
Gold medal – first place	2026 Frankfurt	Hoop
Silver medal – second place	2026 Frankfurt	Clubs
Bronze medal – third place	2025 Rio de Janeiro	Team
Bronze medal – third place	2025 Rio de Janeiro	Ribbon
European Championships
Gold medal – first place	2025 Tallinn	All-around
Silver medal – second place	2025 Tallinn	Team
Silver medal – second place	2025 Tallinn	Clubs
Bronze medal – third place	2024 Budapest	Hoop
Bronze medal – third place	2025 Tallinn	Hoop
Bronze medal – third place	2025 Tallinn	Ribbon
Bronze medal – third place	2026 Varna	All-around
European Cup
Gold medal – first place	2025 Baku	Hoop
Gold medal – first place	2025 Baku	Clubs
Gold medal – first place	2025 Baku	Ribbon
Gold medal – first place	2026 Baku	Hoop
Silver medal – second place	2026 Baku	Ribbon
Silver medal – second place	2026 Baku	Cross Battle
Bronze medal – third place	2025 Baku	Cross Battle
Bronze medal – third place	2025 Baku	Ball
Grand Prix Final
Gold medal – first place	2025 Brno	All-around
Gold medal – first place	2025 Brno	Hoop
Gold medal – first place	2025 Brno	Ball
Gold medal – first place	2026 Brno	All-around
Gold medal – first place	2026 Brno	Ball
Gold medal – first place	2026 Brno	Clubs
Silver medal – second place	2024 Brno	All-around
Silver medal – second place	2024 Brno	Hoop
Silver medal – second place	2024 Brno	Ball
Silver medal – second place	2024 Brno	Ribbon
Junior World Championships
Silver medal – second place	2023 Cluj-Napoca	Clubs

Taisiia Andriivna Onofriichuk (Ukrainian: Таїсія Андріївна Онофрійчук; born 26 May 2008) is a Ukrainian rhythmic gymnast. She is the 2025 European all-around champion, the first Ukrainian European Champion since 1997, as well as the 2026 World hoop gold medalist, the 2024 European hoop bronze medalist and the 2023 Junior World clubs silver medalist. She represented Ukraine at the 2024 Summer Olympics in the women's rhythmic individual all-around, where she qualified for the final and finished in 9th place.

On national level, she is a two-time (2024, 2025) Ukrainian all-around champion.

== Career ==
=== Junior ===
In 2022, Onofriichuk competed at the Junior European Championships in Tel Aviv, Israel. She finished fourth with her teammates, and individually, she placed seventh in the hoop final and eighth in the ribbon final. Later that year, she won the junior all-around gold medal at the Aeon Cup held in Tokyo, Japan.

In July 2023, Onofriichuk competed at the Junior World Championships in Cluj-Napoca. She won a silver medal with the clubs behind Poland's Liliana Lewińska, the first-ever medal for Ukraine at the Junior World Championships. She was also fourth in the team competition, sixth with the hoop, and eighth with the ribbon. She once again competed at the Aeon Cup in Japan along with her teammates Viktoriia Onopriienko and Polina Karika. There, she won the silver medal in the junior all-around behind Germany's Lada Pusch.

=== Senior ===
==== 2024 ====
Onofriichuk became age-eligible for senior international competitions in 2024. She made her senior international debut at the 2024 Tartu Grand Prix, winning bronze in the all-around behind teammate Viktoriia Onopriienko and Bulgaria's Elvira Krasnobaeva. She won a gold medal in the clubs final, and she won another bronze medal in the ball final. Then at the Thiais Grand Prix, she won a bronze medal in the ribbon final in addition to placing eighth in the all-around and ball finals.

Onofriichuk won a medal at her first FIG World Cup competition when, at the 2024 Sofia World Cup, she won bronze in the ribbon final behind Stiliana Nikolova and Daria Atamanov. The next week, at the World Cup in Baku, she won three more medals - silver with clubs and bronze with ball and ribbon. She also placed fourth in the all-around. She then won the all-around title at the 2024 Ukrainian Championships.

Onofriichuk competed at the 2024 European Championships in Budapest, Hungary, and finished eighth in the team competition with Viktoriia Onopriienko and the senior group. She successfully qualified for the all-around final, finishing in ninth place. Onofriichuk also qualified for three apparatus finals and won a bronze medal in the hoop final, which was held on her 16th birthday. She placed sixth in the ribbon final and eighth in the ball final. At the Grand Prix Final in Brno, she won the all-around silver medal behind Elvira Krasnobaeva. She also won silver medals in the hoop, ball, and ribbon finals. Then at the Milan World Cup, she won bronze medals in both the club and ribbon finals. She also placed fourth in the all-around behind Darja Varfolomeev, Sofia Raffaeli, and teammate Viktoriia Onopriienko.

Onofriichuk was selected to represent Ukraine at the 2024 Summer Olympics in place of her teammate Onopriienko. Irina Deriugina, coach and selector of the Ukrainian team, indicated that she based her decision on the criteria established by the Ukrainian Olympic Committee, where Onofriichuk scored more points than Onopriienko, although the latter was the one that won the Olympic quota for Ukraine. That same week, Onofriichuk competed in July at the World Challenge Cup in Cluj-Napoca, where she placed seventh in the all-around, fourth in the clubs final and won a gold medal in the ribbon final.

From August 8 to 9, Onofriichuk competed at the 2024 Summer Olympics. She qualified for the all-around final of the top 10 in fourth place with very good performances. On the day of the all-around final, she dropped the apparatus in both her hoop and ball exercises and finished in 9th place.

On September 28 and 29, she competed in the Aeon Cup in Tokyo with teammates Khrystyna Pohranychna and Taisiia Redka, where the Deriugina School team won the silver medal. In the senior all-around, Onofriichuk won the bronze medal behind Sofia Raffaeli and Alina Harnasko.

==== 2025 ====
Onofriichuk began her 2025 season by competed at the Miss Valentine Grand Prix in Tartu in March. She won the all-around competition ahead of Polina Karika and qualified for all four apparatus finals, winning gold in hoop and clubs, silver in ball and bronze in ribbon. On March 22-23, she won the Grand Prix Marbella ahead of Sofia Raffaeli. She also won gold in the ball and clubs finals and silver in the hoop and ribbon finals. The following week, she won another Grand Prix, this time in Thiais, ahead of Tara Dragas. It was the first time since 2015 that a gymnast had won more than three Grand Prix victories in a year; the last was Margarita Mamun. She also won gold in all of the apparatus finals.

The week after Thiais, she competed in her first World Cup in Sofia, where she won gold in the all-around ahead of Stiliana Nikolova. In the apparatus finals, she won gold in the clubs and ribbon finals and silver in the hoop, and she finished fifth in the ball final. On April 18-20, she competed at Baku World Cup and won the silver medal in all-around behind Sofia Raffaeli. She also won gold in the hoop final, silver in the ball and ribbon final, and bronze in the clubs final.

In June, Onofriichuk competed at the 2025 European Championships in Tallinn, Estonia. She received the highest score in the qualifying round and went on to win the all-around final. This was the first time in almost thirty years that a Ukrainian gymnast had won the European Championships, since Olena Vitrychenko won in 1997. She also won bronze medals in hoop and ribbons finals and silver in clubs final.

On July 18-20, she competed at Milan World Cup, where she won bronze in the all-around, two silver medals in the hoop and ribbon finals, and finished fourth in the ball and fifth in the clubs. A week later, she competed in Cluj-Napoca World Challenge Cup, where she won silver in the all-around behind Darja Varfolomeev. She also won two gold medals in the clubs and ribbon finals, a silver in the ball, and finished seventh in the hoop.

In August, she competed at the 2025 World Championships in Rio de Janeiro, Brazil, which was also her first World Championships. She qualified to all-around final from second position, but finished 4th behind Sofia Raffaeli. Together with Polina Karika and senior group she won bronze medal in team competition. She won another bronze medal in ribbon, 4th place in clubs and 6th place in hoop final.

The next month in September, she competed at the Grand Prix Final in Brno, winning three gold medals in the All-Around, hoop and ball. She finished 4th in both the clubs and ribbon finals. With this competition she became the winner of all the Grand Prix in a single year; the last gymnast to achieve this feat was Margarita Mamun in 2013 and she is the first Ukrainian to achieve this since Kateryna Serebrianska in 1995. In October, she competed in the Aeon Cup in Tokyo with teammates Polina Karika and Liubov Gorashchenko, where the Deriugina School team won the gold medal. In the senior all-around, Onofriichuk won gold medal in front of Rin Keys and Amalia Lică.

==== 2026 ====
Onofriichuk started her 2026 season competing at Tartu Grand Prix, taking gold medal in all-around in front of Liliana Lewińska. In finals, she won gold in hoop and ribbon, took 4th place in ball and 6th place in clubs. In March, she won gold medal in all-around ahead of Takhmina Ikromova at Marbella Grand Prix. She also won gold in hoop, ball and ribbon finals and bronze in clubs. From March 28-30, she competed in the Sofia World Cup, winning the all-around gold medal ahead of Stiliana Nikolova. In the apparatus finals, she won gold in hoop, ball, and ribbon, and finished fifth in clubs. She was registered to compete in the Thiais Grand Prix the following week alongside Anastasiia Ikan, however, she was replaced by Polina Karika. In April, she won gold in all-around at the Baku World Cup. She also won gold in hoop and bronze in clubs final.

In May, she competed at the 2026 European Championships in Varna, Bulgaria, and won bronze medal in the all-around final. She took 9th place in team competition alongside Polina Karika and senior group and 6th place in ball final. In June, she won silver medal in all-around behind Varfolomeev at the World Challenge Cup Cluj-Napoca. She took two gold medals in hoop and ribbon, and silver in ball final. In July, she competed at Milan World Cup and took 5th place in all-around, 0.5 point away from the podium. This was her first World Cup all-around finish off the podium since 2024. In the 2026 Rhythmic Gymnastics World Championships in Frankfurt she won the hoop title. She also won the silver medal in the clubs final. The gold medal was won by Stiliana Nikolova in the clubs final. Onofriichuk lost the gold medal by 0.100 points in the clubs final. She won the gold medal for Ukraine after 13 years. The last gold medal for Ukraine was won by Hanna Rizatdinova in the hoop final in 2013 World Rhythmic Gymnastics Championships in Kiev, Ukraine.

In September, she competed at the Grand Prix Final in Brno, winning three gold medals in the All-Around, ball and clubs, and finished 7th in the hoop and 5th in the ribbon final.

== Competitive history ==
Onofriichuk competing her hoop routine at the 2024 Sofia World Cup

Year	Event	Team	AA	HP	BA	CL	RB
Junior
2022	Ukrainian Junior Championships		1st place, gold medalist(s)				
2022	Junior European Championships	4		7			8
2022	Aeon Cup	2nd place, silver medalist(s)	1st place, gold medalist(s)				
2023	Aeon Cup	2nd place, silver medalist(s)	2nd place, silver medalist(s)				
2023	Junior World Championships	4		6		2nd place, silver medalist(s)	8
2023	Ukrainian Junior Championships		1st place, gold medalist(s)				
2023	IT Andalucia Cup		1st place, gold medalist(s)	1st place, gold medalist(s)	1st place, gold medalist(s)		
Senior
2024	Tartu Grand Prix		3rd place, bronze medalist(s)	4	3rd place, bronze medalist(s)	1st place, gold medalist(s)	8
2024	Marbella Grand Prix		17				
2024	Thiais Grand Prix		8		8		3rd place, bronze medalist(s)
2024	Sofia World Cup		12	5			3rd place, bronze medalist(s)
2024	Baku World Cup		4		3rd place, bronze medalist(s)	2nd place, silver medalist(s)	3rd place, bronze medalist(s)
2024	Ukrainian Championships		1st place, gold medalist(s)				
2024	European Championships	8	9	3rd place, bronze medalist(s)	8	28	6
2024	Grand Prix Final		2nd place, silver medalist(s)	2nd place, silver medalist(s)	2nd place, silver medalist(s)	8	2nd place, silver medalist(s)
2024	Milan World Cup		4	9	10	3rd place, bronze medalist(s)	3rd place, bronze medalist(s)
2024	Cluj-Napoca World Challenge Cup		7			4	1st place, gold medalist(s)
2024	Olympic Games		9				
2025	Tartu Grand Prix		1st place, gold medalist(s)	1st place, gold medalist(s)	2nd place, silver medalist(s)	1st place, gold medalist(s)	3rd place, bronze medalist(s)
2025	Marbella Grand Prix		1st place, gold medalist(s)	2nd place, silver medalist(s)	1st place, gold medalist(s)	1st place, gold medalist(s)	2nd place, silver medalist(s)
2025	Thiais Grand Prix		1st place, gold medalist(s)	1st place, gold medalist(s)	1st place, gold medalist(s)	1st place, gold medalist(s)	1st place, gold medalist(s)
2025	Sofia World Cup		1st place, gold medalist(s)	2nd place, silver medalist(s)	5	1st place, gold medalist(s)	1st place, gold medalist(s)
2025	Baku World Cup		2nd place, silver medalist(s)	1st place, gold medalist(s)	2nd place, silver medalist(s)	3rd place, bronze medalist(s)	2nd place, silver medalist(s)
2025	European Cup		3rd place, bronze medalist(s)	1st place, gold medalist(s)	3rd place, bronze medalist(s)	1st place, gold medalist(s)	1st place, gold medalist(s)
2025	Ukrainian Championships		1st place, gold medalist(s)	1st place, gold medalist(s)		2nd place, silver medalist(s)	1st place, gold medalist(s)
2025	European Championships	2nd place, silver medalist(s)	1st place, gold medalist(s)	3rd place, bronze medalist(s)	4	2nd place, silver medalist(s)	3rd place, bronze medalist(s)
2025	Ukrainian Cup		1st place, gold medalist(s)	1st place, gold medalist(s)	1st place, gold medalist(s)	3rd place, bronze medalist(s)	1st place, gold medalist(s)
2025	Milan World Cup		3rd place, bronze medalist(s)	2nd place, silver medalist(s)	4	5	2nd place, silver medalist(s)
2025	Cluj-Napoca World Challenge Cup		2nd place, silver medalist(s)	7	2nd place, silver medalist(s)	1st place, gold medalist(s)	1st place, gold medalist(s)
2025	World Championships	3rd place, bronze medalist(s)	4	6		4	3rd place, bronze medalist(s)
2025	Grand Prix Final		1st place, gold medalist(s)	1st place, gold medalist(s)	1st place, gold medalist(s)	4	4
2025	Aeon Cup	1st place, gold medalist(s)	1st place, gold medalist(s)				
2026	Tartu Grand Prix		1st place, gold medalist(s)	1st place, gold medalist(s)	4	6	1st place, gold medalist(s)
2026	Marbella Grand Prix		1st place, gold medalist(s)	1st place, gold medalist(s)	1st place, gold medalist(s)	3rd place, bronze medalist(s)	1st place, gold medalist(s)
2026	Sofia World Cup		1st place, gold medalist(s)	1st place, gold medalist(s)	1st place, gold medalist(s)	5	1st place, gold medalist(s)
2026	Baku World Cup		1st place, gold medalist(s)	1st place, gold medalist(s)	4	3rd place, bronze medalist(s)	6
2026	European Cup		2nd place, silver medalist(s)	1st place, gold medalist(s)	4	6	2nd place, silver medalist(s)
2026	Ukrainian Championships		2nd place, silver medalist(s)	1st place, gold medalist(s)	1st place, gold medalist(s)	2nd place, silver medalist(s)	3rd place, bronze medalist(s)
2026	European Championships	9	3rd place, bronze medalist(s)	18	6	10	31
2026	Cluj-Napoca World Challenge Cup		2nd place, silver medalist(s)	1st place, gold medalist(s)	2nd place, silver medalist(s)	4	1st place, gold medalist(s)
2026	Milan World Cup		5	2nd place, silver medalist(s)	6	18	9
2026	World Championships	5	4	1st place, gold medalist(s)	26	2nd place, silver medalist(s)	24
2026	Grand Prix Final		1st place, gold medalist(s)	7	1st place, gold medalist(s)	1st place, gold medalist(s)	5

== Routine music information ==
Year	Apparatus	Music title
2022	Hoop	Mi Gente by J Balvin and Willy William
2022	Ball	
2022	Clubs	
2022	Ribbon	Hood Jump by John Powell
2023	Hoop	Mi Gente by J Balvin and Willy William
2023	Hoop (second)	Discoteque by The Roop
2023	Ball	
2023	Clubs	Bad by Michael Jackson
2023	Ribbon	Hood Jump by John Powell
2024	Hoop (first)	Ad Martem by HAVASI
2024	Hoop	Thriller by Michael Jackson
2024	Ball	Sparkling Diamonds from Moulin Rouge!
2024	Clubs	Haze by Power-Haus
2024	Ribbon	Supercalifragilisticexpialidocious by Julie Andrews, Dick Van Dyke & The Pearlie Chorus
2025	Hoop	Thriller by Michael Jackson
2025	Ball (first)	Theory of Light by Eternal Eclipse
2025	Ball (second)	Le Freak by Chic
2025	Clubs	Gonna Make You Sweat (Everybody Dance Now) (feat. Freedom Williams) by C+C Music Factory / Rock This Party (Everybody Dance Now) (feat. Dollarman, Big Ali & Makedah) by Bob Sinclar & Cutee B.
2025	Ribbon	Supercalifragilisticexpialidocious by Julie Andrews, Dick Van Dyke & The Pearlie Chorus
2026	Hoop	Thriller by Michael Jackson
2026	Ball (first)	Vogue by Madonna
2026	Ball (second)	It's Oh So Quiet by Björk
2026	Clubs	Gonna Make You Sweat (Everybody Dance Now) (feat. Freedom Williams) by C+C Music Factory / Rock This Party (Everybody Dance Now) (feat. Dollarman, Big Ali & Makedah) by Bob Sinclar & Cutee B.
2026	Ribbon (first)	Pump up the Jam (Club Mix) by Bodybangers / Pump up the Jam by Crazy Frog / Pump up the Jam by Thomas Gold / Pump up the Jam (feat. HOSANNA) by Gabry Ponte
2026	Ribbon (second)	Carmen by Marcin Patrzalek
