= Daryna Duda =

Ukrainian rhythmic gymnast (born 2003)

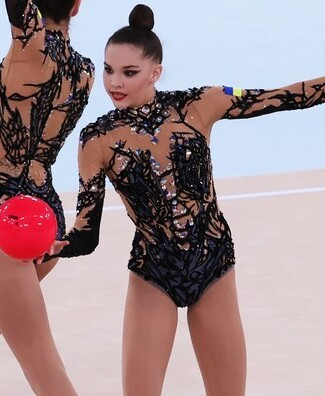
- Duda competing at the 2020 Summer Olympics

Personal information
- Full name: Daryna Volodymyrivna Duda
- Alternative name: Darina Duda
- Born: 29 November 2003 (age 22) Kyiv, Ukraine
- Height: 172 cm (5 ft 8 in)

Gymnastics career
- Discipline: Rhythmic gymnastics
- Country represented: Ukraine
- Club: Deriugins School
- Head coach: Irina Deriugina
Medal record
Rhythmic Gymnastics
Representing Ukraine
World Championships
Bronze medal – third place	2023 Valencia	3 Ribbons + 2 Balls
European Championships
Silver medal – second place	2023 Baku	Team
Bronze medal – third place	2024 Budapest	3 Ribbon + 2 Balls

Daryna Volodymyrivna Duda (Ukrainian: Дарина Володимирівна Дуда; born 29 November 2003) is a Ukrainian group rhythmic gymnast. She won a bronze medal at the 2023 World Championships and a silver medal at the 2023 European Championships. She was the second youngest athlete who represented Ukraine at the 2020 Summer Olympics.

== Gymnastics career ==
=== 2021–2022 ===
Duda represented Ukraine at the 2020 Summer Olympics alongside in Tokyo, Japan, alongside Anastasiya Voznyak, Yeva Meleshchuk, Mariia Vysochanska and Mariola Bodnarchuk. At 17 years old, she was the second-youngest athlete of the entire Ukrainian delegation. The group finished seventh in the all-around final. After the Olympic Games, she competed with the Ukrainian group at the 2021 World Championships in Kitakyushu, Japan. They finished eighth in the group all-around and qualified for the 3 hoops and 4 clubs final, where they finished seventh. Additionally, they finished fourth in the combined team rankings alongside the individual gymnasts.

Duda and the Ukrainian group finished tenth in the all-around and sixth in the 5 hoops final at the 2022 European Championships. Then at the 2022 World Championships, they finished 12th in the group all-around.

=== 2023–2024 ===
In February, Duda competed with the Ukrainian group at the Tartu Grand Prix where they swept the gold medals. They won a bronze medal in 5 hoops at the Baku World Cup. Then at the 2023 European Championships, the Ukrainian group won a silver medal in the team event alongside the individual gymnasts. Duda and the Ukrainian group finished fourth in the all-around and qualified for both event finals. They finished sixth in 5 hoops and fourth in 3 ribbons and 2 balls. At the 2023 World Championships, the Ukrainian group finished fifth in the all-around and qualified for both event finals. They finished seventh in the 5 hoops final, and they won the bronze medal in 3 ribbons and 2 balls.

Duda was removed from the Ukrainian group before the 2024 European Championships.
