= 2002 World Rhythmic Gymnastics Championships =

- Location: New Orleans, United States
- Start date: 10 July 2002
- End date: 14 July 2002

XXV World Rhythmic Gymnastics Championships were held in New Orleans, United States from 10 to 14 July 2002. The competition was open to groups only and the designated apparatuses were Ribbon and Ball & Rope.

== Competitors ==
There were participants from 25 countries including Belarus, Brazil, Bulgaria, Canada, China, Cuba, France, Germany, Greece, Hungary, Italy, Japan, Poland, Russia, Slovakia, South Korea, Spain, Switzerland, Ukraine and United States.

== Medal winners ==
Event	Gold	Silver	Bronze
All-around	Russia	Belarus	Greece
5 ribbons	Ukraine	Russia	Greece
3 balls + 2 ropes	Greece	Bulgaria	Belarus

== Results ==
=== Group all-around ===
Rank	Nation	5	3 + 2	Total
1st place, gold medalist(s)	Russia	23.500	25.550	49.050
2nd place, silver medalist(s)	Belarus	22.950	24.725	47.675
3rd place, bronze medalist(s)	Greece	22.100	25.300	47.400
4	Bulgaria	22.750	24.300	47.050
5	Italy	21.550	24.000	45.550
6	Ukraine	22.600	22.350	44.950
7	China	21.250	21.925	43.175
8	Brazil	20.850	21.250	42.100
9	Spain	21.000	20.550	41.550
10	Japan	19.850	21.300	41.150
11	Poland	19.700	21.400	41.100
12	Austria	19.650	21.325	40.975
13	United States	19.650	20.500	40.150
14	Germany	18.850	19.100	37.950
15	France	18.200	19.600	37.800
16	Hungary	18.700	18.950	37.650
17	Switzerland	18.150	18.725	36.875
18	Slovakia	17.100	19.000	36.100
19	South Korea	15.500	18.475	33.975
20	Cuba	14.200	15.200	29.400

=== Group 5 ribbons ===
Rank	Nation	T Score	A Score	E Score	Pen.	Total
1st place, gold medalist(s)	Ukraine	8.000	8.050	7.775	0.50	23.325
2nd place, silver medalist(s)	Russia	8.000	8.050	7.500	0.60	22.950
3rd place, bronze medalist(s)	Greece	7.700	7.850	7.600	0.50	22.650
4	Bulgaria	7.300	7.800	7.600	0.50	22.200
5	Italy	7.300	7.650	7.200	0.50	21.650
6	Belarus	6.800	7.700	7.000	0.50	21.000
7	Spain	5.700	7.400	7.100	0.50	19.700
8	China	6.300	6.800	6.450	0.50	19.050

=== Group 3 balls + 2 ropes ===
Rank	Nation	T Score	A Score	E Score	Pen.	Total
1st place, gold medalist(s)	Greece	8.100	7.950	8.400		24.450
2nd place, silver medalist(s)	Bulgaria	7.900	7.900	7.800		23.600
3rd place, bronze medalist(s)	Belarus	7.500	8.300	8.200	0.50	23.500
4	Italy	8.000	7.500	7.875		23.375
5	Ukraine	7.800	7.700	7.975	0.50	22.975
6	China	7.900	6.650	8.125		22.675
7	Russia	7.700	7.850	6.625	0.70	21.475
8	Poland	6.800	7.150	7.725	0.50	21.175
