= Iryna Blokhina =

Ukrainian singer and TV presenter (born 1983)

Irina "Ireesha" Blokhina
- Ірина Олегівна Блохіна
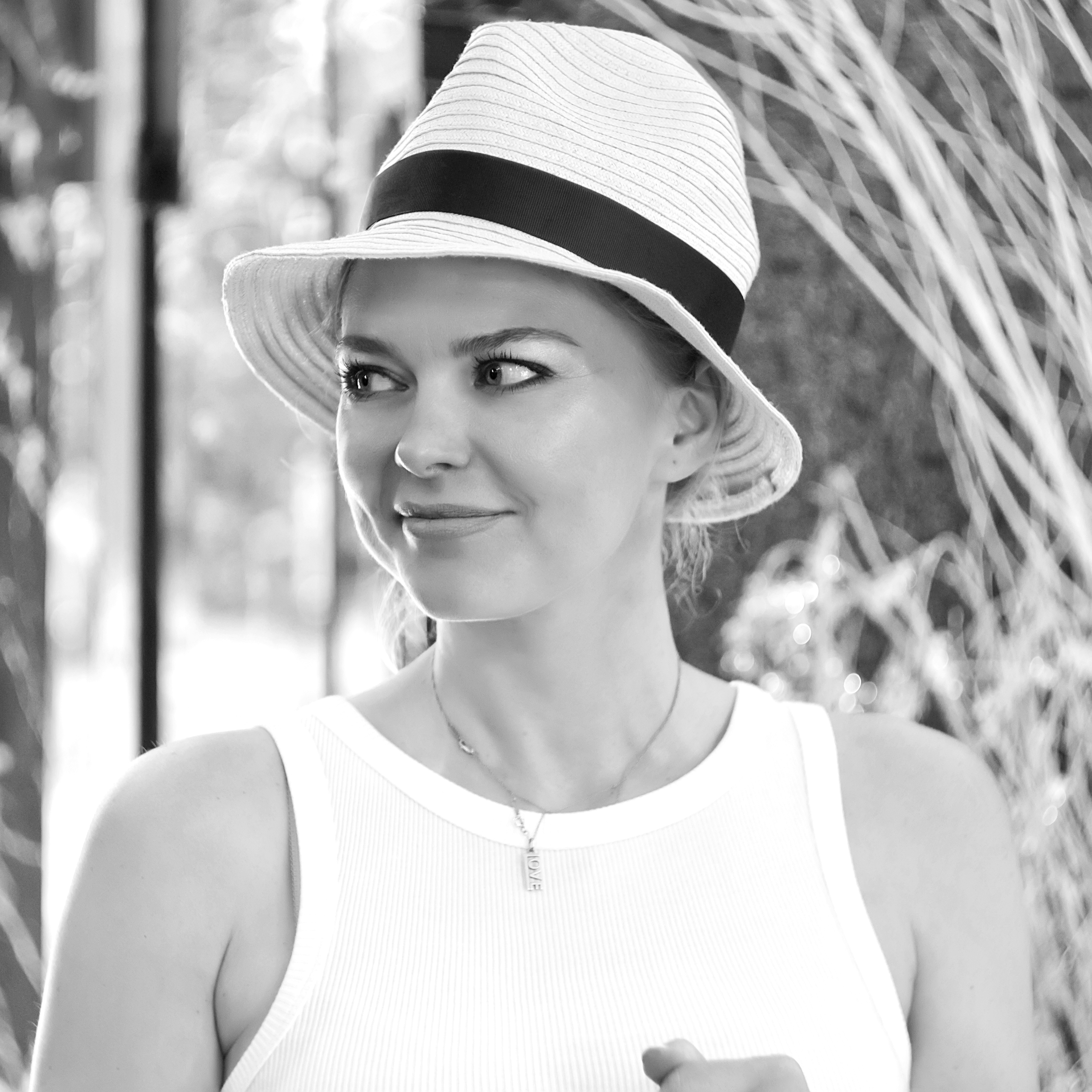
- Ireesha Blokhina in 2017
- Born: Iryna Olehivna Blokhina; 15 January 1983 (age 43); Kyiv, Ukrainian SSR, Soviet Union
- Other name: Ireesha
- Occupations: Olympic coach and choreographer of the Ukrainian rhythmic gymnastics national team; singer; TV host
- Years active: 1999–present
- Spouse: Aleksey Brynzak
- Website: ireesha.com.ua

Iryna Olehivna Blokhina (Ukrainian: Ірина Олегівна Блохіна; born January 15, 1983) is a Ukrainian athlete, singer, and TV host. She is a director of the Kyiv Deriugina School and a vice-President of the Ukrainian Gymnastics Federation. Blokhina is a team coach and choreographer of the Ukrainian rhythmic gymnastics Olympic team.

== Biography ==
She was born on January 15, 1983, in Kyiv to a family of well-known Ukrainian (Soviet) and Kyivan sportspeople. Her father is a Soviet highly decorated football player and coach Oleh Blokhin. Her mother is Irina Deriugina, multiple World and European champion and medalist in rhythmic gymnastics.

In 1990, she moved to Athens, Greece, with her father when he became the coach of one of the leading Greek football clubs, Olympiacos F.C.. She studied at St. Lawrence College.

In 1998, she started choreographing Gala for the National Team of Ukraine.

In 2000, she studied music, theatre, and film production in Los Angeles, United States. When she lived in the US, she had some episodic roles in films and television: Click, Two and a Half Men and Thank You.

In 2003, for the first time in history, her “Moulin Rouge” choreography, featuring Anna Bessonova, Natalia Godunko, and Tamara Yerofeeva, was performed at the World Championships in Budapest. She was the first to introduce Gala into the competition program. Many years later, thanks to her efforts, it became a mandatory part of every competition. She has been choreographing, directing, and producing the Deriugina Cup Gala show for over 20 years.

In 2011, she moved back to Kyiv, Ukraine, to become an official coach with the National Olympic Team of Ukraine in rhythmic gymnastics as well as the coach of the Deriugina School. She made her debut as a coach at the 2011 World Championships in Montpellier, France.

In 2012 was her first Olympic Games in London as a coach with the National Team of Ukraine.

In the fall of 2012, she was invited to direct and choreograph an all-star gala show in Seoul, Korea, where five leading countries of rhythmic gymnastics participated. The event was a huge success and sold out.

In 2012, she composed a song, "З'єднаємо Весь Світ" ("Let the whole world Unite"), which was widely sung during Euro 2012. That year Blokhina was a TV host of a popular Ukrainian TV show about football, called Великий футбол (Great Football). The next year, she wrote & performed "We Make This World Go!", which was the official song of the 2013 World Rhythmic Gymnastics Championships in Kyiv.

In 2013, she became the coach of Ukrainian and Crimean athlete Hanna Rizatdinova. Winning a gold medal at the 2013 World Rhythmic Gymnastics Championships in Kyiv. Once again, she participated as one of the key organizers of the event. Director and choreographer of the Opening and Closing ceremony. For the first time, there was a music video made with the participation of rhythmic gymnastics stars from around the world.

On November 1, 2014, Ireesha gave birth to a daughter, Jacqueline Brynzak, with her husband Aleksey Brynzak.

In 2015, at the World Rhythmic Gymnastics Championships in Stuttgart, Germany, they won the license to go to the Olympic Games the next year in Rio, Brazil.

In 2016, Ireesha Blohina and Hanna Rizatdinova brought home a bronze medal from the Olympic Games in Rio, Brazil.
