= Gymnastics at the 2021 Islamic Solidarity Games =

Gymnastics competition

- Venue: Konya Velodrome
- Dates: 10–18 August 2022
- Competitors: 113 from 17 nations

Gymnastics at the 2021 Islamic Solidarity Games was held in Konya, Turkey from 10 to 18 August 2022 in Konya Velodrome. Gymnastics competitions were held between 10–11 August 2022 for Men's Artistic and 17–18 August 2022 for Women's Artistic Gymnastics. Aerobic competitions were held between 13–14 August 2022 and The Rhythmic Gymnastics competitions were held on 13–14 August 2022.

The Games were originally scheduled to take place from 20 to 29 August 2021 in Konya, Turkey. In May 2020, the Islamic Solidarity Sports Federation (ISSF), who are responsible for the direction and control of the Islamic Solidarity Games, postponed the games as the 2020 Summer Olympics were postponed to July and August 2021, due to the global COVID-19 pandemic.

== Medalists ==
=== Men's artistic ===
Event	Gold	Silver	Bronze
Team	Turkey; Ferhat Arıcan; Adem Asil; Ahmet Önder	Uzbekistan; Rasuljon Abdurakhimov; Abdulla Azimov; Khabibullo Ergashev	Kazakhstan; Milad Karimi; Nariman Kurbanov; Dmitriy Patanin
Individual all-around	Adem Asil; Turkey	Ivan Tikhonov; Azerbaijan	Rasuljon Abdurakhimov; Uzbekistan
Floor	Ahmet Önder; Turkey	Dmitriy Patanin; Kazakhstan	Adem Asil; Turkey
Pommel horse	Ahmad Abu Al-Soud; Jordan	Nariman Kurbanov; Kazakhstan	Ferhat Arıcan; Turkey
Rings	Adem Asil; Turkey	Nikita Simonov; Azerbaijan	Ahmet Önder; Turkey
Vault	Ivan Tikhonov; Azerbaijan	Adem Asil; Turkey	Ahmet Önder; Turkey
Parallel bars	Ferhat Arıcan; Turkey	Ahmet Önder; Turkey	Rasuljon Abdurakhimov; Uzbekistan
Horizontal bar	Ahmet Önder; Turkey	Milad Karimi; Kazakhstan	Ivan Tikhonov; Azerbaijan

=== Women's artistic ===
Event	Gold	Silver	Bronze
Team	Turkey; Sevgi Seda Kayışoğlu; Bilge Tarhan; Bengisu Yıldız	Uzbekistan; Dildora Aripova; Oksana Chusovitina; Ominakhon Khalilova	Kazakhstan; Aida Bauyrzhanova; Ayazhan Shamshitdinova
Individual all-around	Bengisu Yıldız; Turkey	Dildora Aripova; Uzbekistan	Sevgi Seda Kayışoğlu; Turkey
Vault	Oksana Chusovitina; Uzbekistan	Bilge Tarhan; Turkey	Bengisu Yıldız; Turkey
Uneven bars	Sevgi Seda Kayışoğlu; Turkey	Bengisu Yıldız; Turkey	Aida Bauyrzhanova; Kazakhstan
Balance beam	Dildora Aripova; Uzbekistan	Aida Bauyrzhanova; Kazakhstan	Bengisu Yıldız; Turkey
Floor	Aida Bauyrzhanova; Kazakhstan	Ominakhon Khalilova; Uzbekistan	Bilge Tarhan; Turkey

=== Rhythmic ===
Event	Gold	Silver	Bronze
Team	Azerbaijan; Zohra Aghamirova; Alina Gozalova; Ilona Zeynalova	Uzbekistan; Takhmina Ikromova; Yosmina Rakhimova; Sabina Tashkenbaeva	Kazakhstan; Elzhana Taniyeva; Aibota Yertaikyzy
Hoop	Takhmina Ikromova; Uzbekistan	Zohra Aghamirova; Azerbaijan	Elzhana Taniyeva; Kazakhstan
Ball	Elzhana Taniyeva; Kazakhstan	Takhmina Ikromova; Uzbekistan	Zohra Aghamirova; Azerbaijan
Clubs	Zohra Aghamirova; Azerbaijan	Takhmina Ikromova; Uzbekistan	Sabina Tashkenbaeva; Uzbekistan
Ribbon	Zohra Aghamirova; Azerbaijan	Takhmina Ikromova; Uzbekistan	Elzhana Taniyeva; Kazakhstan
Group all-around	Azerbaijan; Gullu Aghalarzade; Laman Alimuradova; Kamilla Aliyeva; Zeynab Hummatova; Yelyzaveta Luzan; Darya Sorokina	Uzbekistan; Khurshidabonu Abduraufova; Nilufar Azamova; Nargiza Djumaniyazova; Shakhzoda Ibragimova; Mumtozabonu Iskhokzoda; Mariya Pak	Kazakhstan; Aruzhan Kassenova; Aislu Murzagaliyeva; Aidana Shayakhmetova; Assel Shukirbay; Renata Zholdinova
5 hoops	Uzbekistan; Khurshidabonu Abduraufova; Nilufar Azamova; Nargiza Djumaniyazova; Shakhzoda Ibragimova; Mumtozabonu Iskhokzoda; Mariya Pak	Azerbaijan; Gullu Aghalarzade; Laman Alimuradova; Kamilla Aliyeva; Zeynab Hummatova; Yelyzaveta Luzan; Darya Sorokina	Kazakhstan; Aruzhan Kassenova; Aislu Murzagaliyeva; Aidana Shayakhmetova; Assel Shukirbay; Renata Zholdinova
3 ribbons + 2 balls	Azerbaijan; Gullu Aghalarzade; Laman Alimuradova; Kamilla Aliyeva; Zeynab Hummatova; Yelyzaveta Luzan; Darya Sorokina	Uzbekistan; Khurshidabonu Abduraufova; Nilufar Azamova; Nargiza Djumaniyazova; Shakhzoda Ibragimova; Mumtozabonu Iskhokzoda; Mariya Pak	Turkey; Işıl Alaş; Yeliz Güneş; Nehir Serap Özdemir; Melisa Sert; Duru Duygu Usta

=== Aerobic ===
Event	Gold	Silver	Bronze
Men's individual	Vladimir Dolmatov; Azerbaijan	Mehmet Utku Çırak; Turkey	Ali Khalili; Iran
Women's individual	Ayşe Begüm Onbaşı; Turkey	Madina Mustafayeva; Azerbaijan	Amdivie Kouhounha; Benin
Mixed pair	Azerbaijan; Vladimir Dolmatov; Madina Mustafayeva	Turkey; Can Derviş; Nil Deniz Bal	Turkey; Nihatcan Gül; Nazlı Özgör
Trio	Turkey; Mehmet Utku Çırak; Can Sarı; Ahmet Meriç Turmamış	Azerbaijan; Vladimir Dolmatov; Khoshgadam Guliyeva; Madina Mustafayeva	Iran; Amir Hossein Baniasad; Alireza Nabipour; Saeid Najafi
Team	Turkey; Nil Deniz Bal; Mehmet Utku Çırak; Can Derviş; Nihatcan Gül; Ayşe Begüm Onbaşı; Nazlı Özgör; Can Sarı; Ahmet Meriç Turmamış	Azerbaijan; Vladimir Dolmatov; Khoshgadam Guliyeva; Madina Mustafayeva	Sierra Leone; Umaru Barrie; Michael Fornah; Kehinde Ibrahim; Fatu Jalloh; Elizabeth Kamara

== Medal table ==
Rank	Nation	Gold	Silver	Bronze	Total
1	Turkey (TUR)	12	6	10	28
2	Azerbaijan (AZE)	8	7	2	17
3	Uzbekistan (UZB)	4	10	3	17
4	Kazakhstan (KAZ)	2	4	8	14
5	Jordan (JOR)	1	0	0	1
6	Iran (IRI)	0	0	2	2
7	Benin (BEN)	0	0	1	1
7	Sierra Leone (SLE)	0	0	1	1
Totals (8 entries)		27	27	27	81

== Participating nations ==
A total of 113 athletes from 17 nations competed in gymnastics at the 2021 Islamic Solidarity Games:

- Azerbaijan (17)
- Bangladesh (3)
- Benin (2)
- Indonesia (3)
- Iran (7)
- Jordan (1)
- Kazakhstan (12)
- Kyrgyzstan (9)
- Lebanon (2)
- Malaysia (6)
- Pakistan (3)
- Qatar (2)
- Saudi Arabia (2)
- Sierra Leone (5)
- Turkey (21)
- Uzbekistan (15)
- Yemen (3)

== Gallery ==
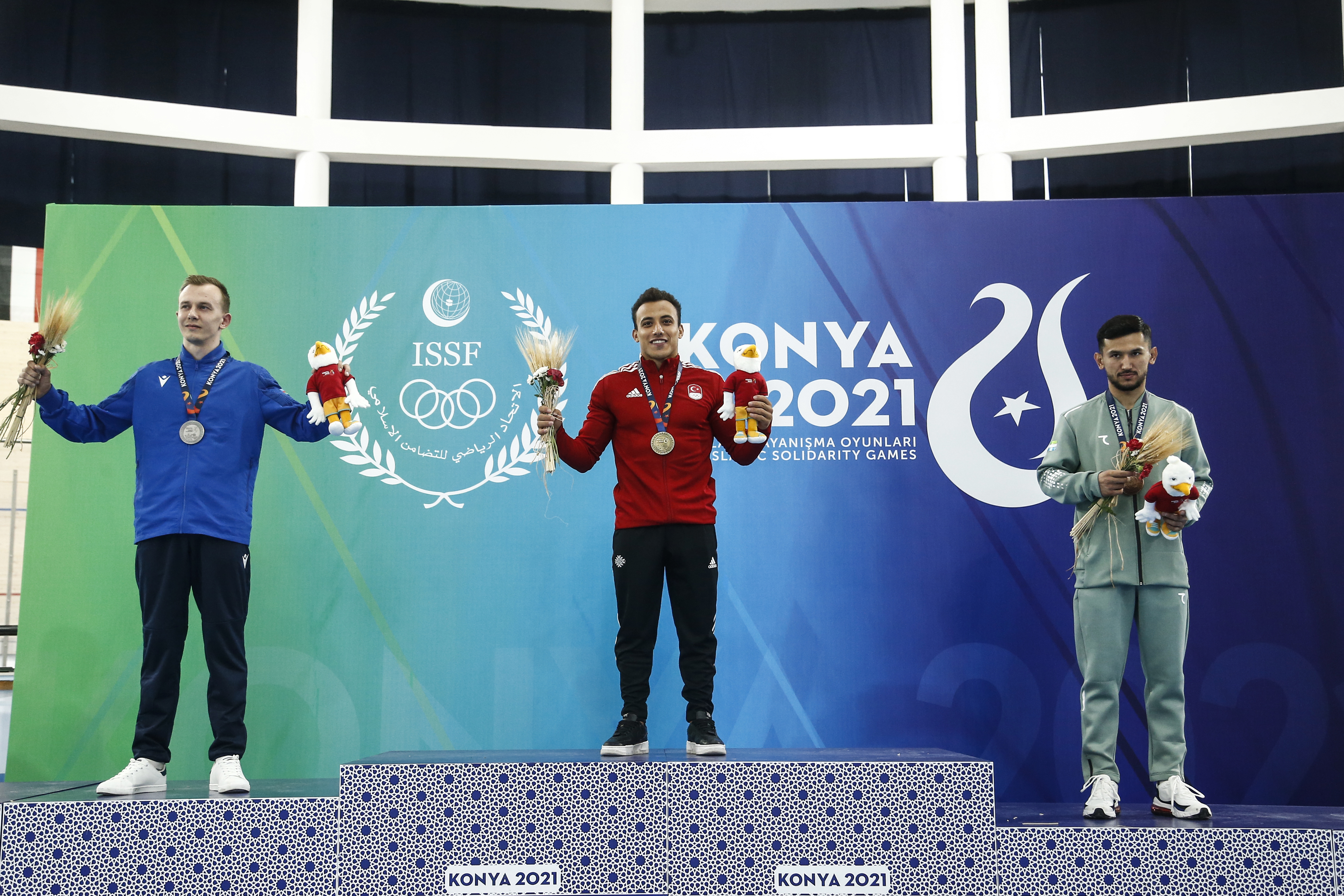
Men Gymnastics Individual all-around Medal Ceremony

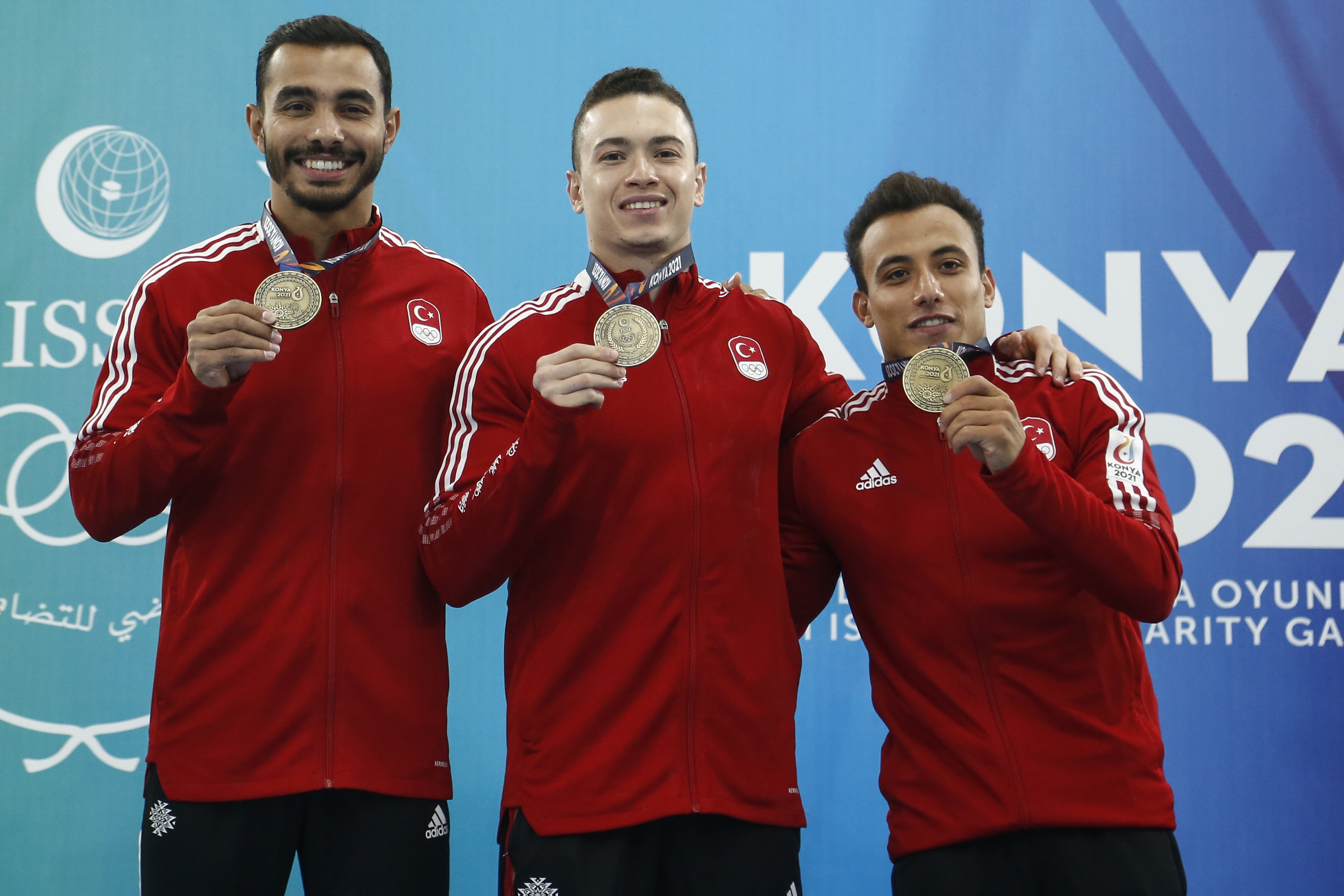
Men Gymnastics Team Medal Ceremony Turkey Team

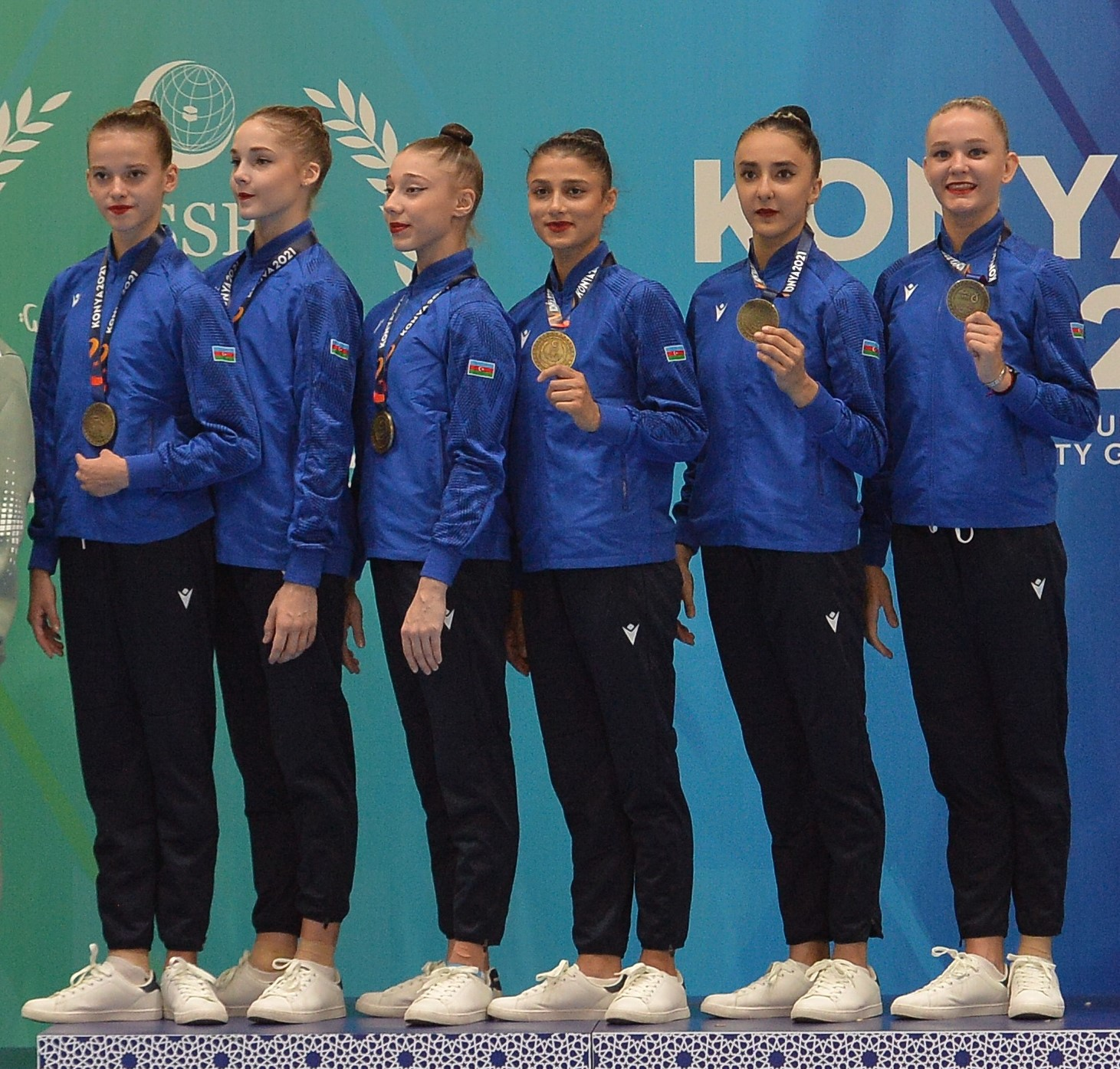
Women Gymnastics Team Medal Ceremony Azerbaijan team

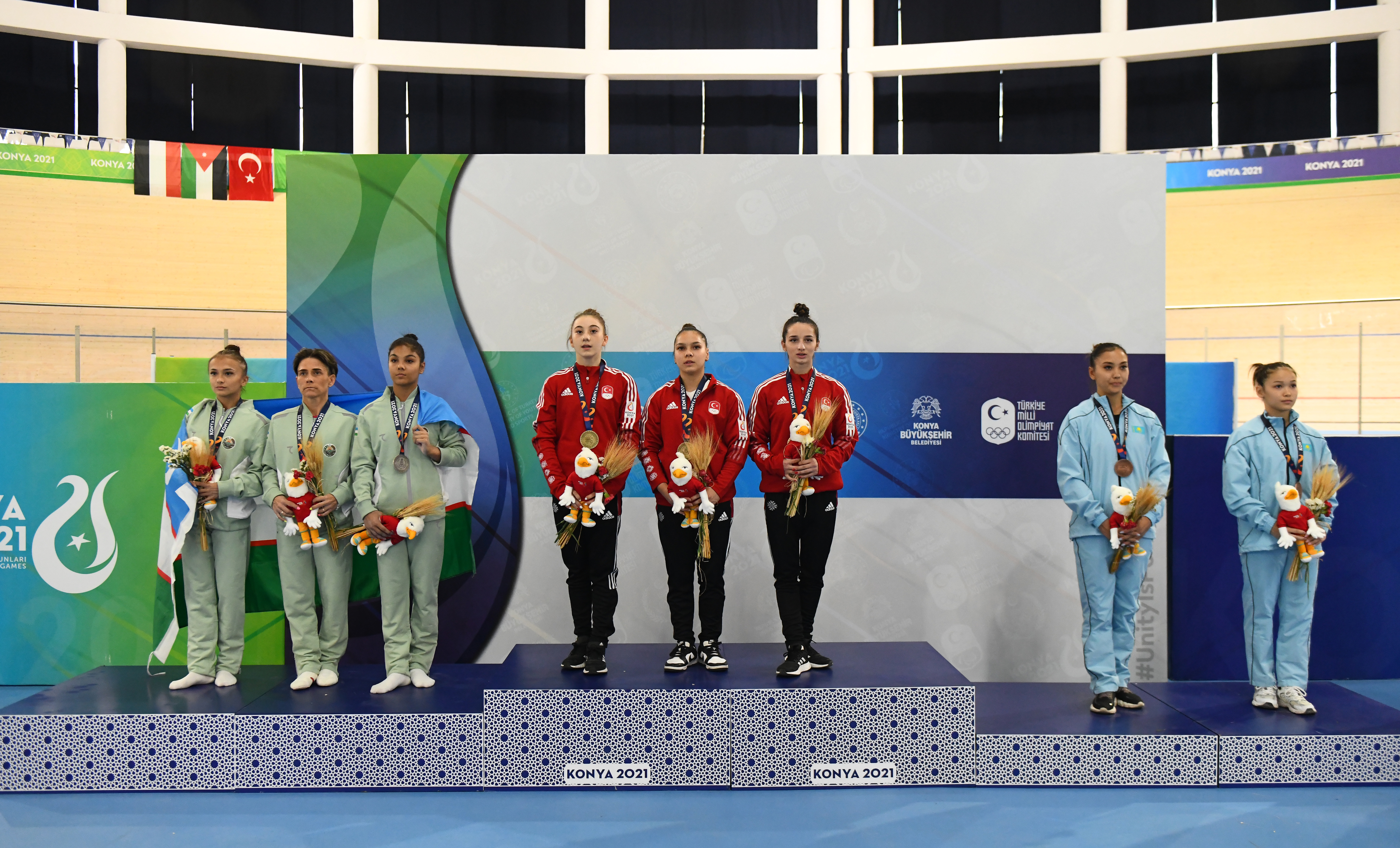
Women artistic team podium

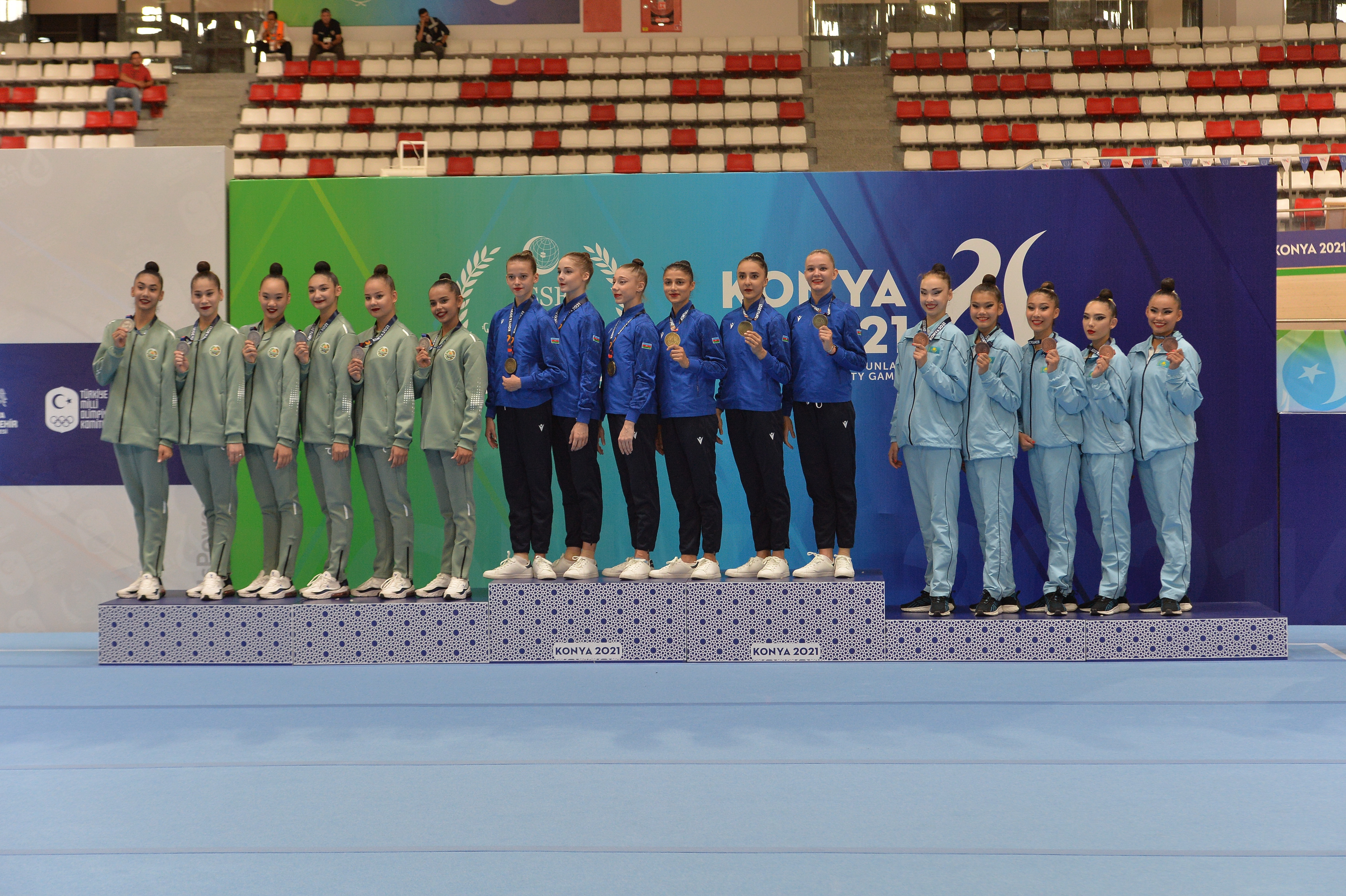
Women Gymnastics Team Medal Ceremony

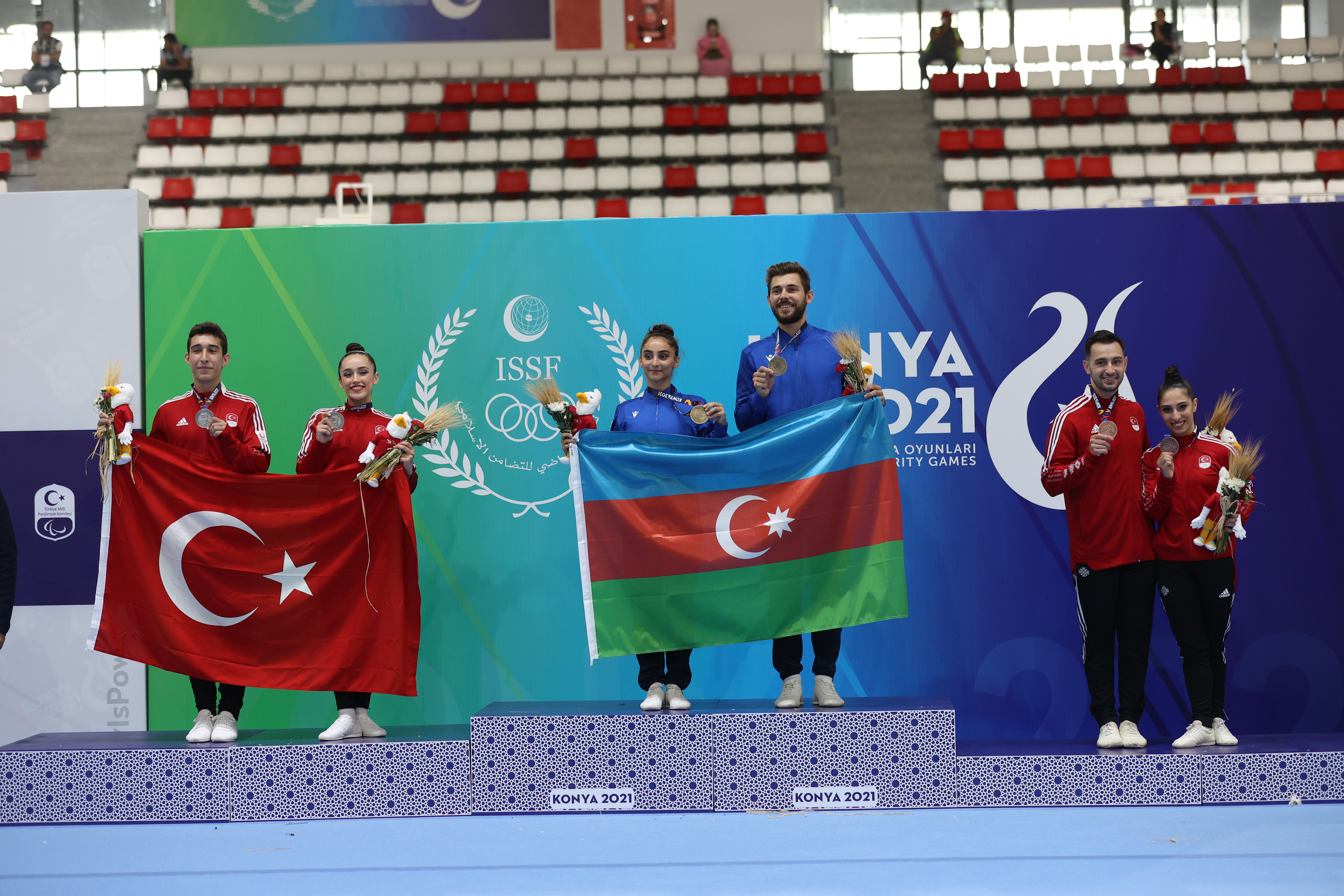
Aerobic Mixed pair Medal ceremony

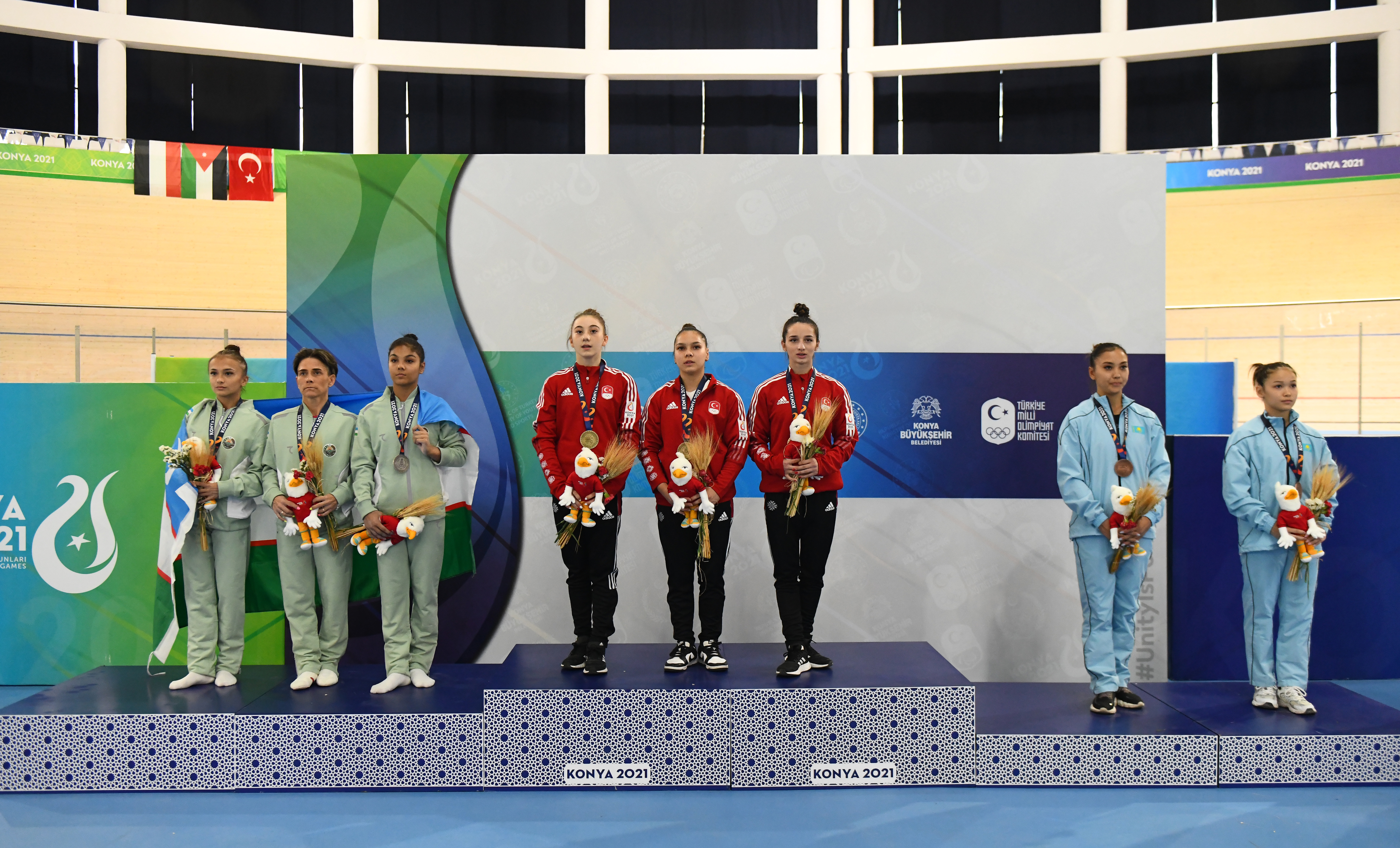
Women artistic Medal Ceremony

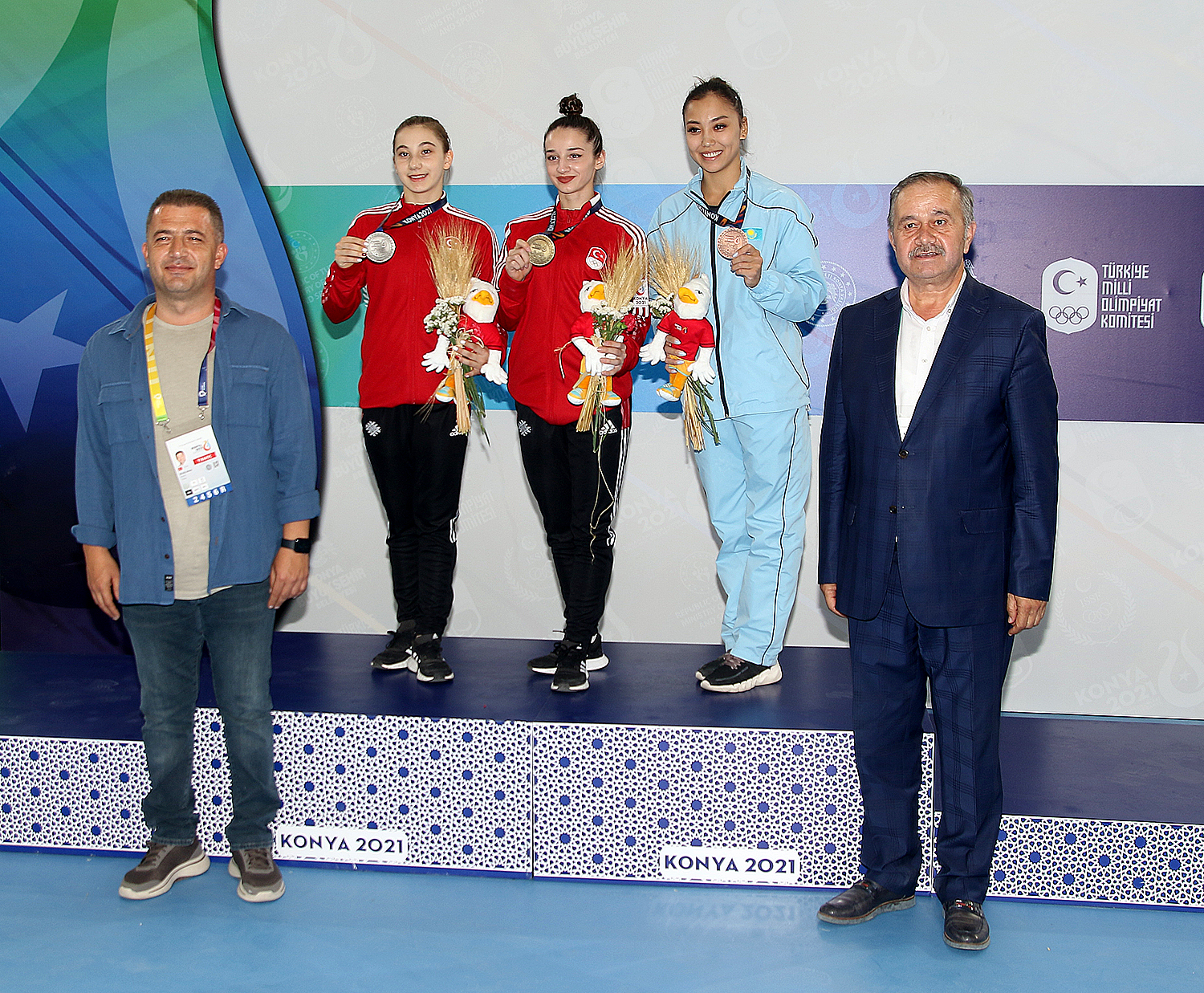
Women Uneven bars Medal ceremony

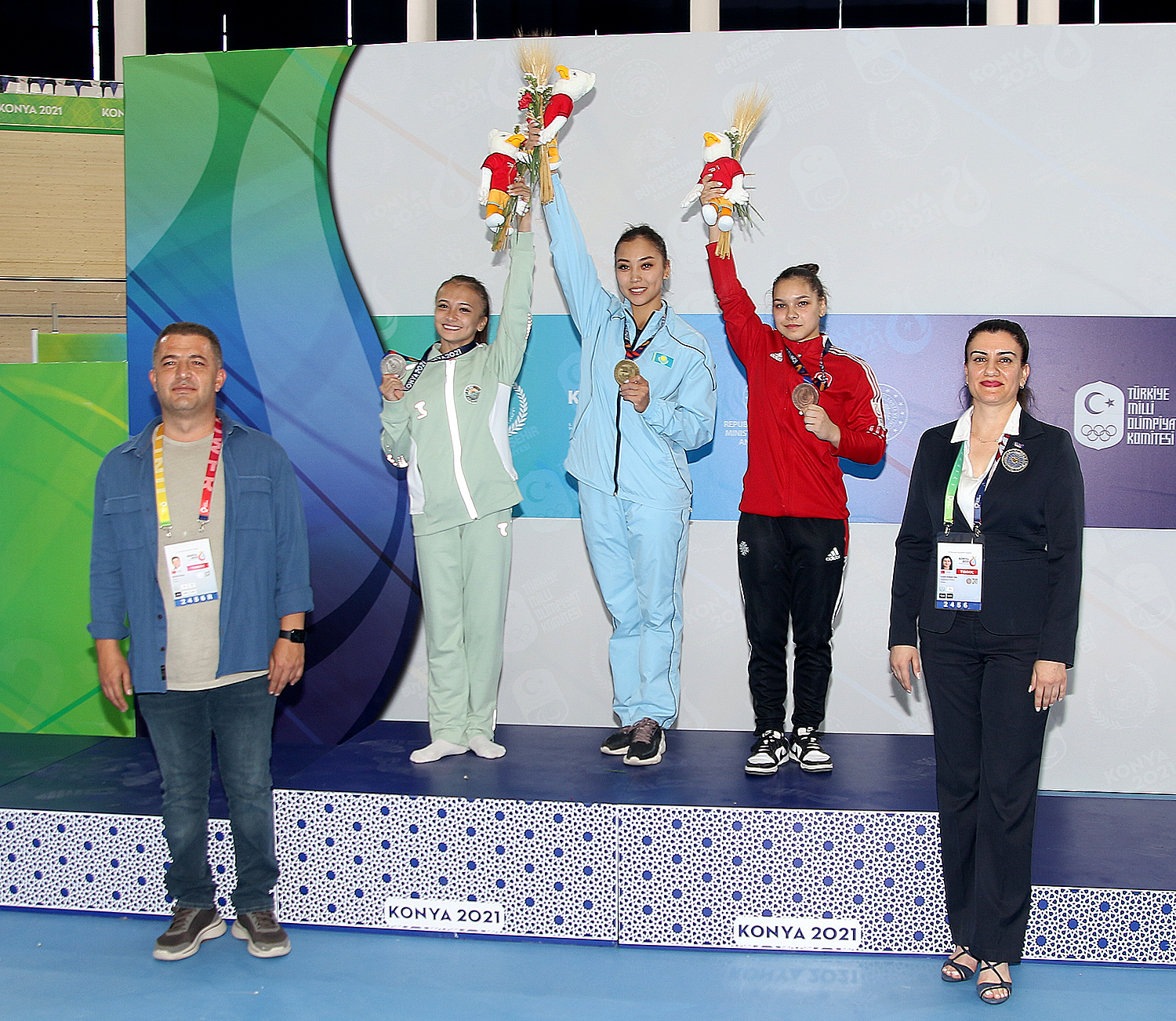
Women Floor Medal ceremony

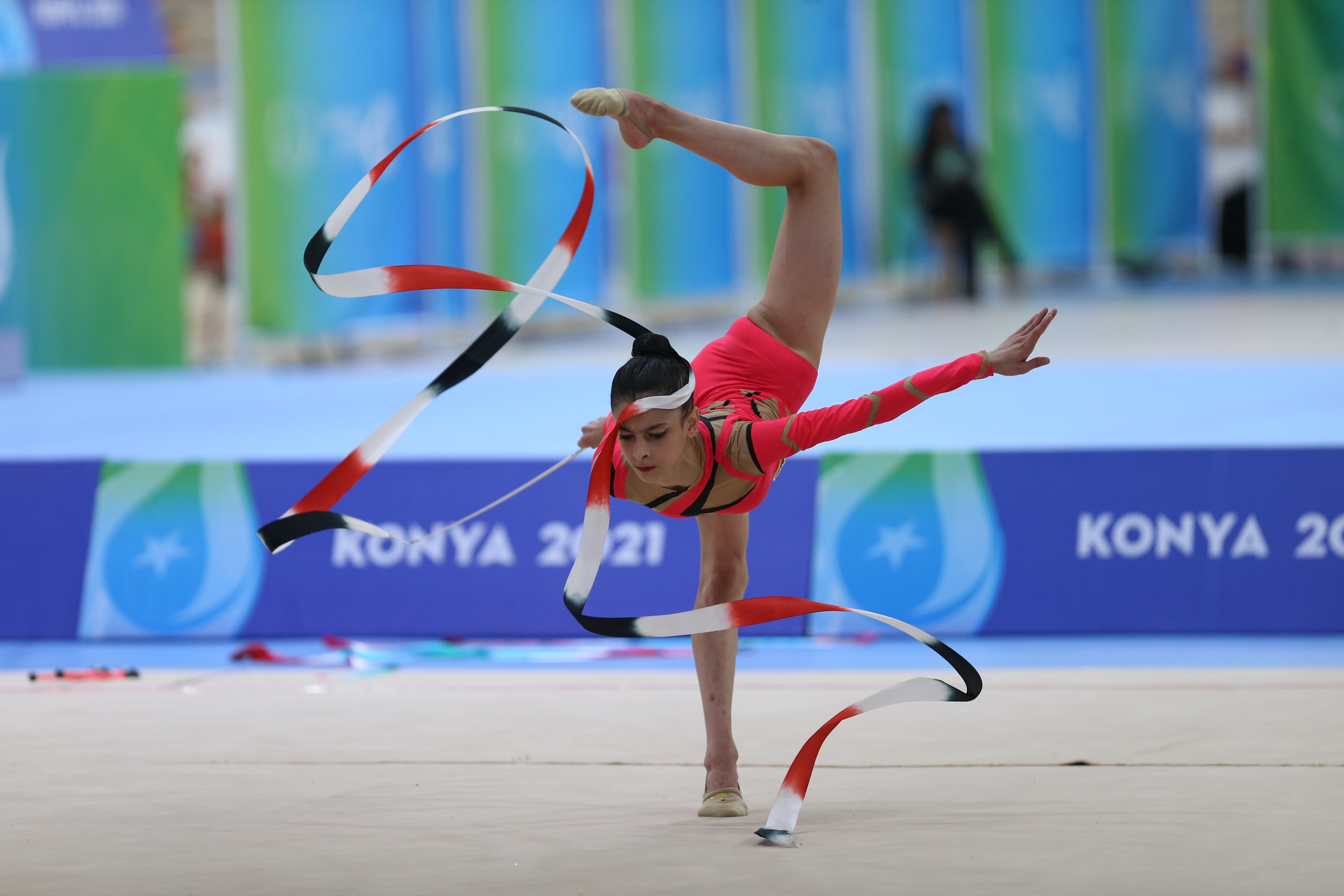
Gymnastics Women

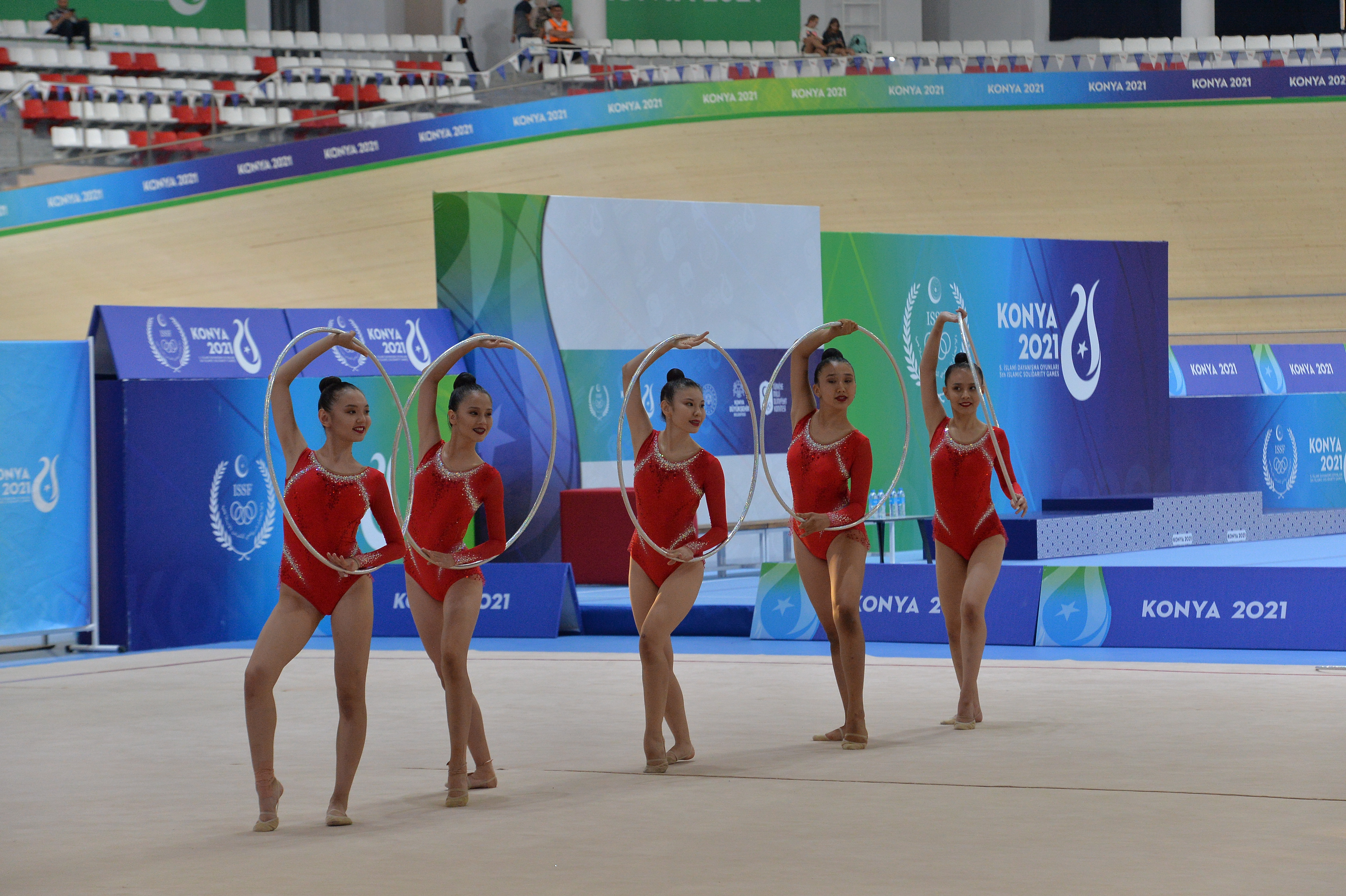
Gymnastics Women

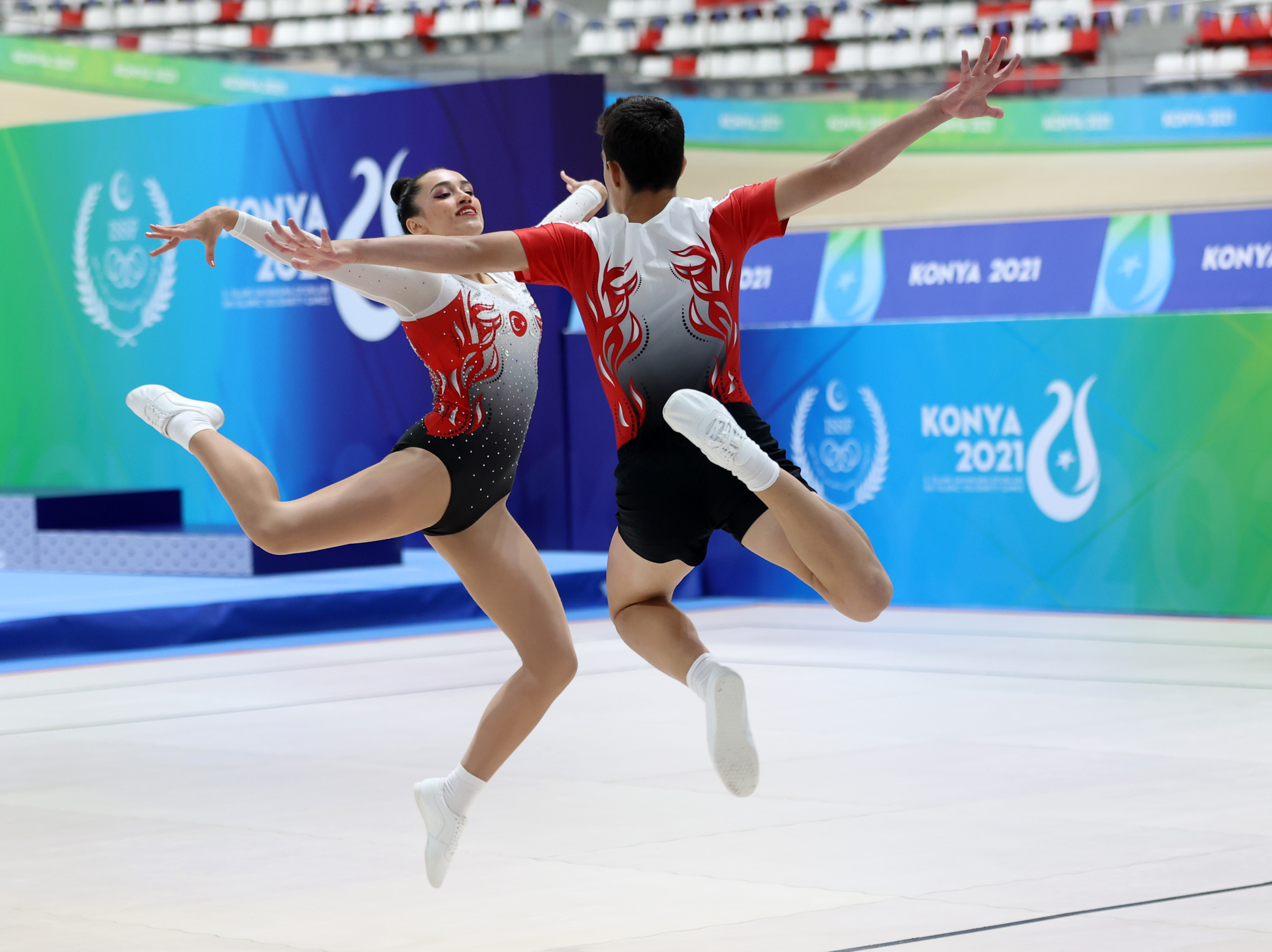
Gymnastics Aerobic Mixed pair
