= Milana Parfilova =

Kazakhstani rhythmic gymnast

- Милана Парфилова
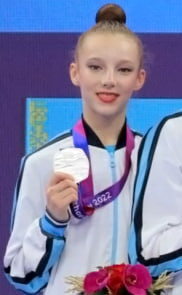
- Born: 30 June 2007 (age 19) Kazakhstan

Gymnastics career
- Discipline: Rhythmic gymnastics
- Country represented: Kazakhstan (2022-2026)
- Retired: yes
Medal record
Representing Kazakhstan
Rhythmic gymnastics
Asian Games
Silver medal – second place	2022 Hangzhou	Team
Bronze medal – third place	2022 Hangzhou	All-Around
Asian Championships
Silver medal – second place	2023 Manila	Team
Silver medal – second place	2022 Pattaya	Junior Hoop
Gold medal – first place	2022 Pattaya	Junior Team
Gold medal – first place	2022 Pattaya	Junior Ball
Event	1st	2nd	3rd
FIG World Challenge Cup	0	1	1
Total	0	1	1

Milana Parfilova (Russian: Милана Александровна Парфилова; born 30 June 2007) is a retired Kazakhstani rhythmic gymnast. She is the 2022 Asian Games individual bronze medalist and silver team medalist.

== Career ==
At the 2022 Junior Asian Championships in Pattaya, she won gold in teams and with ball and silver with hoop.

Parfilova started her senior career at the Aphrodite Cup in March, where she won two silver medals, one with hoop and one with ball. Two weeks later, she competed at the 2023 World Cup in Sofia, where she was 21st in the all-around. She then participated at her first senior Grand Prix in Thiais, France. She finished 7th in the all-around, and in the finals she finished 4th in clubs and 5th with ribbon. Her next competition was the World Cup in Baku, Azerbaijan where she finished 17th.

She was selected for the Asian Championships in Manila, where she won silver in teams along with the other Kazakhstani gymnasts. In mid-July, she was 18th in the World Cup stage in Cluj-Napoca.

In September, she competed at the delayed 2022 Asian Games. There she won silver in the team competition, along with her teammates Elzhana Taniyeva and Erika Zhailauova, and she was bronze in the individual all-around.

In the 2024 season, she competed in April at the World Cup in Tashkent, where she qualified for the hoop final and finished in 5th place. While she was not sent to the 2024 Asian Championships, in May, she went to the World Challenge Cup in Portimão, where she came in 5th place in the all-around. In the apparatus finals, she won a silver with hoop and bronze with ribbon. In late May, she was the silver all-around medalist at the Kazhakstani national championships, behind Taniyeva and ahead of Aibota Yertaikyzy.

== Routine music information ==
Year	Apparatus	Music title
2024	Hoop	"Lust of Power" by Gabriel Saban
2024	Ball	"FEVER" (feat. SUPERBEE & Bibi) by Park Jin-young
2024	Clubs	"Hector's Death" (from Troy) by James Horner / "Succession" by Brand X Music
2024	Ribbon	"Bumblebee Boogie" by Robert Wells
2023	Hoop	"Qélé, Qélé" by Sirusho
2023	Ball	"Una Mattina" by Ludovico Einaudi / "Ping Pong" by Hyuna & Dawn
2023	Clubs	"Soul Makossa (Money) - UK Radio Edit" by Yolanda Be Cool & DCUP
2023	Ribbon	"Bumblebee Boogie" by Robert Wells
2022	Hoop	Carmen Suite No. 1 Les toreadors by Alfred Schols, London Festival Orchestra
2022	Ball	"El Anillo" by Jennifer Lopez
2022	Clubs	
2022	Ribbon	
