= Sagina Muratkyzy =

Kazakh rhythmic gymnast

- Born: 11 November 2003 (age 22) Kazakhstan

Gymnastics career
- Discipline: Rhythmic gymnastics
- Country represented: Kazakhstan; (2017-junior national team of KZ 2019-senior national team of KZ)
- Club: Specialised Youth Sports School of Olympic Reserve No.1
- Head coach: Aliya Yussupova
- Assistant coaches: Inna Bystrova, Aliya Yussupova
Medal record
Rhythmic gymnastics
Representing Kazakhstan
Event	1st	2nd	3rd
Asian Championships	1	1	1
FIG World Cup	0	1	3
Islamic Solidarity Games	0	0	2
Total	1	2	6
Asian Championships
Gold medal – first place	2022 Pattaya	5 Hoops
Silver medal – second place	2022 Pattaya	Team
Bronze medal – third place	2022 Pattaya	Group All-Around
Islamic Solidarity Games
Bronze medal – third place	2021 Konya	Group All-Around
Bronze medal – third place	2021 Konya	5 Hoops

Sagina Muratkyzy (born 11 November 2003) is a Kazakh rhythmic gymnast, member of the national group.

== Personal life ==
Muratkyzy began participating in the sport at age four.

She received the title of Master of Sport of International Class in Kazakhstan. She studied Physical Education at LN Gumilyov Eurasian National University in Nur-Sultan.

== Career ==
Sagina began competing as a member of the national senior group in 2019, at the World Championships in Baku, where the Kazakh team came in 24th in the all-around and routines. In 2021, she competed in Kitakyushu for the World Championships, where Kazakhstan placed 16th all-around. 16th, with 5 balls, 15th, with 3 hoops and 4 clubs.

=== Medals ===
In 2022, she debuted at the World Cup in Athens, where she ranked 4th in the all-around, with 3 ribbons and 2 balls. She won bronze with 5 hoops.

A month later, in Tashkent, the group won silver in the all-around, with 3 ribbons and 2 balls, as well as bronze with 5 hoops.

A week later, she competed in Baku with the group, taking 7th place in the all-around and won bronze, with 3 ribbons and 2 balls.

In June, she took part in the World Cup in Pesaro, ending 8th in the all-around, with 2 balls and 3 balls, and 6th, with 5 hoops.

From June 23rd to 26th, the group participated at the 2022 Asian Rhythmic Gymnastics Championships in Pattaya, winning gold with 5 hoops, silver in teams and bronze in the group all-around. ]

In August, Sagina competed at the 2021 Islamic Solidarity Games in Konya, where the group won bronze in the all-around, with 5 hoops.

In September, Sagina took part in the World Championships in Sofia, along with Aruzhan Kassenova, Aidana Shakenova, Assel Shukirbay, Renata Zholdinova, Elzhana Taniyeva, and Aibota Yertaikyzy. They came in 24th place in the all-around, 26th with 5 hoops and 21st, with 3 ribbons and 2 balls.
