= Renata Zholdinova =

Kazakh rhythmic gymnast

- Born: 6 February 2003 (age 23) Kazakhstan

Gymnastics career
- Discipline: Rhythmic gymnastics
- Country represented: Kazakhstan (2016-present)
- Club: East Kazakhstan Regional Sports School of Olympic Reserve
- Head coach: Elena Fotina
- Assistant coaches: Inna Bystrova, Aliya Yussupova
Medal record
Rhythmic gymnastics
Representing Kazakhstan
Event	1st	2nd	3rd
Asian Championships	1	1	1
FIG World Cup	0	1	3
Islamic Solidarity Games	0	0	2
Total	1	2	6
Asian Championships
Gold medal – first place	2022 Pattaya	5 Hoops
Silver medal – second place	2022 Pattaya	Team
Bronze medal – third place	2022 Pattaya	Group All-Around
Islamic Solidarity Games
Bronze medal – third place	2021 Konya	Group All-Around
Bronze medal – third place	2021 Konya	5 Hoops

Renata Zholdinova (born 6 February 2003) is a Kazakh rhythmic gymnast, member of the national group.

== Personal life ==
Renata took up the sport at age four her mother, who used to do artistic gymnastics, introduced her to the sport.

== Career ==
Zholdinova was first included in the national team as a junior in 2016, getting to compete at the 2017 Asian Championships in Astana with the junior group.

Renata debuted into the senior national group at the 2022 World Cup in Athens where she was 4th in the All-Around and with 3 ribbons and 2 balls, winning bronze with 5 hoops. A month later in Tashkent the group won silver in the All-Around and with 3 ribbons and 2 balls as well as bronze with 5 hoops. A week later she competed in Baku with the group, taking 7th place in the All-Around and won bronze with 3 ribbons and 2 balls. In June she took part in the World Cup in Pesaro, ending 8th in the All-Around and with 3 balls and 2 balls, 6th with 5 hoops. From June 23 to 26 the group participated at the 2022 Asian Rhythmic Gymnastics Championships in Pattaya, winning gold with 5 hoops, silver in teams and bronze in the group All-Around. In August Zholdinova competed at the 2021 Islamic Solidarity Games in Konya where the group won bronze in the All-Around and with 5 hoops. In September Renata took part in the World Championships in Sofia along Sagina Muratkyzy, Aidana Shakenova, Assel Shukirbay, Aruzhan Kassenova, and the two individuals Elzhana Taniyeva and Aibota Yertaikyzy, taking 24th place in the All-Around, 26th with 5 hoops and 21st with 3 ribbons + 2 balls.
