= Mumtozabonu Iskhokzoda =

Uzbekistani rhythmic gymnast (born 2005)

- Born: 31 December 2005 (age 20) Tashkent, Uzbekistan

Gymnastics career
- Discipline: Rhythmic gymnastics
- Country represented: Uzbekistan; (2019-present)
- Head coach: Rano Mukhamedova
- Assistant coach: Luiza Ganieva
- Choreographer: Maria Akhrarova
Medal record
Rhythmic gymnastics
Representing Uzbekistan
Event	1st	2nd	3rd
Asian Championships	7	4	0
FIG World Cup	1	2	2
Islamic Solidarity Games	1	2	0
Total	9	8	2
Asian Championships
Gold medal – first place	2022 Pattaya	Team
Gold medal – first place	2023 Manila	Team
Gold medal – first place	2022 Pattaya	Group All-Around
Gold medal – first place	2022 Pattaya	3 Ribbons + 2 Balls
Gold medal – first place	2024 Tashkent	Group All-Around
Gold medal – first place	2026 Bishkek	Team
Gold medal – first place	2026 Bishkek	Group All-Around
Silver medal – second place	2023 Manila	Group All-Around
Silver medal – second place	2022 Pattaya	5 Hoops
Silver medal – second place	2023 Manila	3 Ribbons + 2 Balls
Silver medal – second place	2024 Tashkent	5 Hoops
Islamic Solidarity Games
Gold medal – first place	2021 Konya	5 Hoops
Silver medal – second place	2021 Konya	Group All-Around
Silver medal – second place	2021 Konya	3 Ribbons + 2 Balls

Mumtozabonu Iskhokzoda (born 31 December 2005) is an Uzbekistani rhythmic gymnast who competes member of the national group.

== Personal life ==
Iskhokzoda took up rhythmic gymnastics at age four after her parents encouraged her to try the sport. Her idol is Russian rhythmic gymnast Aleksandra Soldatova, and her dream is to compete at the Olympic Games and become world champion. She has received the title of Candidate for Master of Sport in Uzbekistan.

== Career ==
Iskhokzoda debuted at the first Junior World Championships in Moscow, placing 11th in teams, 17th in the all-around, 14th with 5 ribbons and 20th in 5 hoops.

In 2022 she entered the senior national group. She debuted at the World Cup in Tashkent, winning silver in the all-around and with 5 hoops as well as gold with 3 ribbons and 2 balls. A week later. the group competed in Baku, ending 6th in the All-Around, 7th with 5 hoops and 3 ribbons and 2 balls. In June she took part in the World Cup in Pesaro, taking 8th place in the All-Around and 7th with 5 hoops.

She was then selected for the Asian Championships in Pattaya. The group won gold in teams with the other Uzebekistani gymnasts. They also won gold in the group all-around and with 3 ribbons and 2 balls, in addition to silver with 5 hoops. In August, she competed at the 2021 Islamic Solidarity Games in Konya where the group won silver in the all-around and with 3 ribbons and 2 balls. They also won gold with 5 hoops.

In September Iskhokzoda took part in the World Championships in Sofia along Khurshidabonu Abduraufova, Nargiza Djumaniyazova, Shakhzoda Ibragimova, Nilufar Azamova, Mariya Pak, and the two individuals Takhmina Ikromova and Yosmina Rakhimova. The group took 18th place in the all-around, 13th with 5 hoops and 20th with 3 ribbons + 2 balls.

At the 2023 World Championships, Iskhokzoda and the rest of the group placed 15th in the all-around.

In 2024, Iskhokzoda competed at the World Cup in Tashkent and won a silver medal in the 3 ribbons and 2 balls final. The next week, she participated in the 2024 Asian Championships, where the Uzbekistani group won gold in the all-around. Their placement earned them a berth at the 2024 Summer Olympics.
