= 2018 Rhythmic Gymnastics Asian Cup =

Gymnastics championship in Ulaanbaatar, Mongolia

The 1st Rhythmic Gymnastics Asian Cup was held in Ulaanbaatar, Mongolia from October 26 to 28, 2018. The competition had senior and junior divisions, and a team event consisting of two senior gymnasts and one junior gymnast.

== Medal winners ==
=== Team ===
Event	Gold	Silver	Bronze
All-around	Chinese Taipei; Kung Yun (senior); Hsiung I-hui (senior); Lee Yu-wen (junior)	Mongolia; Undram Khashbat (senior); Nomin-Erdene Gansukh (senior); Enkhjin Sod-Od (junior)	Hong Kong; Cheng Lai Chun (senior); Wan Ka Kei (senior); Ali Sun Yi (junior)

=== Senior ===
==== Individual ====
Event	Gold	Silver	Bronze
All-around	Aidana Sarybay (KAZ)	Seo Go-eun (KOR)	Kung Yun (TPE)
Hoop	Aidana Sarybay (KAZ)	Seo Go-eun (KOR)	Undram Khashbat (MGL)
Ball	Seo Go-eun (KOR)	Aidana Sarybay (KAZ)	Undram Khashbat (MGL)
Clubs	Aidana Sarybay (KAZ)	Seo Go-eun (KOR)	Undram Khashbat (MGL)
Ribbon	Aidana Sarybay (KAZ)	Seo Go-eun (KOR)	Undram Khashbat (MGL)

==== Group ====
Event	Gold	Silver	Bronze
All-around	North Korea	Chinese Taipei	Thailand
5 hoops	North Korea	Chinese Taipei	South Korea
3 balls + 2 ropes	North Korea	Mongolia	Chinese Taipei

=== Junior ===
==== Individual ====
Event	Gold	Silver	Bronze
All-around	Elzhana Taniyeva (KAZ)	Moon Dong-ju (KOR)	Aisha Izabekova (KGZ)
Hoop	Elzhana Taniyeva (KAZ)	Aisha Izabekova (KGZ)	Moon Dong-ju (KOR)
Ball	Elzhana Taniyeva (KAZ)	Aisha Izabekova (KGZ)	Enkhjin Sod-Od (MGL)
Clubs	Aisha Izabekova (KGZ)	Elzhana Taniyeva (KAZ)	Moon Dong-ju (KOR)
Ribbon	Elzhana Taniyeva (KAZ)	Aisha Izabekova (KGZ)	Moon Dong-ju (KOR)

== Participating nations ==
- Chinese Taipei
- India
- Hong Kong
- Kazakhstan
- Kyrgyzstan
- Mongolia
- North Korea
- South Korea
- Thailand
- Uzbekistan
- Vietnam

== See also ==
- 2018 Asian Rhythmic Gymnastics Championships
