= Assel Shukirbay =

Kazakh rhythmic gymnast

- Әсел Шүкірбай
- Born: 7 October 2006 (age 19) Kazakhstan

Gymnastics career
- Discipline: Rhythmic gymnastics
- Country represented: Kazakhstan (2022–present)
- Club: Shymkent Specialised Rhythmic Gymnastics Youth Sports School of Olympic Reserve No.9
- Head coach: Aliya Yussupova
- Assistant coaches: Inna Bystrova, Aliya Yussupova
Medal record
Rhythmic gymnastics
Representing Kazakhstan
Event	1st	2nd	3rd
Asian Championships	1	1	1
FIG World Cup	0	1	3
Islamic Solidarity Games	0	0	2
Total	1	2	6
Asian Championships
Gold medal – first place	2022 Pattaya	5 Hoops
Silver medal – second place	2022 Pattaya	Team
Bronze medal – third place	2022 Pattaya	Group All-Around
Islamic Solidarity Games
Bronze medal – third place	2021 Konya	Group All-Around
Bronze medal – third place	2021 Konya	5 Hoops

Äsel Şükırbai (Note: Often transliterated as Assel Shukirbay through a Russified Romanization of Асель Шукирбай.) (Kazakh: Әсел Шүкірбай; born 7 October 2006) is a Kazakh rhythmic gymnast, member of the national group.

== Career ==
Shukirbay debuted into the senior national group at the 2022 World Cup in Athens where she was 4th in the All-Around and with 3 ribbons and 2 balls, winning bronze with 5 hoops. A month later in Tashkent the group won silver in the All-Around and with 3 ribbons and 2 balls as well as bronze with 5 hoops. A week later she competed in Baku with the group, taking 7th place in the All-Around and won bronze with 3 ribbons and 2 balls. In June she took part in the World Cup in Pesaro, ending 8th in the All-Around and with 3 balls and 2 balls, 6th with 5 hoops. From June 23 to 26 the group participated at the 2022 Asian Rhythmic Gymnastics Championships in Pattaya, winning gold with 5 hoops, silver in teams and bronze in the group All-Around. In August Assel competed at the 2021 Islamic Solidarity Games in Konya where the group won bronze in the All-Around and with 5 hoops. In September Shukirbay took part in the World Championships in Sofia along Sagina Muratkyzy, Aidana Shakenova, Aruzhan Kassenova, Renata Zholdinova, and the two individuals Elzhana Taniyeva and Aibota Yertaikyzy, taking 24th place in the All-Around, 26th with 5 hoops and 21st with 3 ribbons + 2 balls.
