= 2022 Asian Rhythmic Gymnastics Championships =

Gymnastics event in Pattaya, Thailand

2022 Asian Gymnastics Championships
- Venue: Eastern National Sports Training Center
- Location: Pattaya, Thailand
- Start date: 23 June 2022
- End date: 26 June 2022

The 13th Rhythmic Gymnastics Asian Championships and the 18th Junior Asian Gymnastics Championships were held in Pattaya, Thailand from June 23 to 26, 2022. It was the second time that Pattaya held the Asian Championships, the first time being in 2019.

== Medal winners ==
=== Senior ===
Event	Gold	Silver	Bronze
All-around
Individual	Takhmina Ikromova (UZB)	Sumire Kita (JPN)	Zhao Yating (CHN)
Team	Uzbekistan; Sabina Tashkenbaeva; Takhmina Ikromova; Yosmina Rakhimova; Shakhzoda Ibragimova; Mariya Pak; Nilufar Azamova; Mumtozabonu Iskhokzoda; Khurshidabonu Abduraufova; Nargiza Djumaniyazova	Kazakhstan; Elzhana Taniyeva; Aibota Yertaikyzy; Aruzhan Kassenova; Sagina Muratkyzy; Aislu Murzagaliyeva; Aidana Shayakhmetova; Renata Zholdinova; Assel Shukirbay	Japan; Sumire Kita; Mirano Kita; Ayuka Suzuki; Nanami Takenaka; Chihana Nakamura; Rina Imaoka; Rinako Inaki; Fuka Inuko
Group	Uzbekistan; Shakhzoda Ibragimova; Mariya Pak; Nilufar Azamova; Mumtozabonu Iskhokzoda; Khurshidabonu Abduraufova; Nargiza Djumaniyazova	Japan; Ayuka Suzuki; Nanami Takenaka; Chihana Nakamura; Rina Imaoka; Rinako Inaki; Fuka Inuko	Kazakhstan; Aruzhan Kassenova; Sagina Muratkyzy; Aislu Murzagaliyeva; Aidana Shayakhmetova; Renata Zholdinova; Assel Shukirbay
Individual
Hoop	Takhmina Ikromova (UZB)	Sumire Kita (JPN)	Zhao Yating (CHN)
Ball	Takhmina Ikromova (UZB)	Sabina Tashkenbaeva (UZB)	Sumire Kita (JPN)
Clubs	Takhmina Ikromova (UZB)	Elzhana Taniyeva (KAZ)	Sumire Kita (JPN)
Ribbon	Elzhana Taniyeva (KAZ)	Takhmina Ikromova (UZB)	Zhao Yating (CHN)
Group
5 hoops	Kazakhstan	Uzbekistan	Japan
3 ribbons + 2 Ball	Uzbekistan	Japan	Chinese Taipei

=== Junior ===
Event	Gold	Silver	Bronze
All-around
Team	Kazakhstan	Uzbekistan	Japan
Individual
Hoop	Nataliya Usova (UZB)	Milana Parfilova (KAZ)	Anna Oh (KOR)
Ball	Milana Parfilova (KAZ)	Anna Oh (KOR)	Anastasiya Sarantseva (UZB)
Clubs	Evelina Atalyants (UZB)	Aiym Meirzhanova (KAZ)	Asema Badykeeva (KGZ)
Ribbon	Vilana Savadyan (UZB)	Erika Zhailauova (KAZ)	Sesera Baba (JPN)
Group
5 ropes	Kazakhstan	Japan	Uzbekistan
5 balls	Japan	Uzbekistan	Kazakhstan

== Medal table ==
=== Overall ===
Rank	Nation	Gold	Silver	Bronze	Total
1	Uzbekistan (UZB)	10	5	2	17
2	Kazakhstan (KAZ)	5	5	2	12
3	Japan (JPN)	1	5	6	12
4	South Korea (KOR)	0	1	1	2
5	China (CHN)	0	0	3	3
6	Chinese Taipei (TPE)	0	0	1	1
6	Kyrgyzstan (KGZ)	0	0	1	1
Totals (7 entries)		16	16	16	48
