= Nilufar Azamova =

Uzbekistani rhythmic gymnast (born 2004)

- Born: 10 March 2004 (age 22) Fergana, Uzbekistan

Gymnastics career
- Discipline: Rhythmic gymnastics
- Country represented: Uzbekistan; (2019-present)
- Head coach: Rano Mukhamedova
- Assistant coach: Luiza Ganieva
- Choreographer: Maria Akhrarova
Medal record
Rhythmic gymnastics
Representing Uzbekistan
Event	1st	2nd	3rd
Asian Championships	3	1	0
FIG World Cup	1	2	0
Islamic Solidarity Games	1	2	0
Total	5	5	0
Asian Championships
Gold medal – first place	2022 Pattaya	Team
Gold medal – first place	2022 Pattaya	Group All-Around
Gold medal – first place	2022 Pattaya	3 Ribbons + 2 Balls
Silver medal – second place	2022 Pattaya	5 Hoops
Islamic Solidarity Games
Gold medal – first place	2021 Konya	5 Hoops
Silver medal – second place	2021 Konya	Group All-Around
Silver medal – second place	2021 Konya	3 Ribbons + 2 Balls

Nilufar Azamova (born 10 March 2004) is an Uzbek rhythmic gymnast, member of the national group.

== Personal life ==
Nilufar took up rhythmic gymnastics in 2008 in Fergana, after her mother encouraged her to try the sport. Her idol is Russian rhythmic gymnast Aleksandra Soldatova, her dream is to compete at the Olympic Games. She has received the title of Candidate for Master of Sport in Uzbekistan.

== Career ==
Azamova debuted at the 1st Junior World Championships in Moscow, placing 11th in teams, 17th in the All-Around, 14th with 5 ribbons and 20th in the 5 hoops.

In 2022 she entered the senior national group, debuting at the World Cup in Tashkent, winning silver in the All-Around and with 5 hoops as well as gold with 3 ribbons and 2 balls. A week later the group competed in Baku, ending 6th in the All-Around, 7th with 5 hoops and 3 ribbons and 2 balls. In June she took part in the World Cup in Pesaro, taking 8th place in the All-Around and 7th with 5 hoops. She was then selected for the Asian Championships in Pattaya, winning gold in teams, the All-Around and with 3 ribbons and 2 balls and silver with 5 hoops. In August Nilufar competed at the 2021 Islamic Solidarity Games in Konya where the group won silver in the All-Around and with 3 ribbons and 2 balls, gold with 5 hoops. In September Azamova took part in the World Championships in Sofia along Khurshidabonu Abduraufova, Nargiza Djumaniyazova, Shakhzoda Ibragimova, Mumtozabonu Iskhokzoda, Mariya Pak, and the two individuals Takhmina Ikromova and Yosmina Rakhimova, taking 18th place in the All-Around, 13th with 5 hoops and 20th with 3 ribbons + 2 balls.
