= Mariya Pak =

Uzbekistani rhythmic gymnast (born 2005)

- Born: 19 November 2005 (age 20) Tashkent, Uzbekistan

Gymnastics career
- Discipline: Rhythmic gymnastics
- Country represented: Uzbekistan; (2022-present)
- Head coach: Rano Mukhamedova
- Assistant coach: Luiza Ganieva
- Choreographer: Maria Akhrarova
Medal record
Rhythmic gymnastics
Representing Uzbekistan
Event	1st	2nd	3rd
Asian Championships	3	1	0
FIG World Cup	1	2	0
Islamic Solidarity Games	1	2	0
Total	5	5	0
Asian Championships
Gold medal – first place	2022 Pattaya	Team
Gold medal – first place	2022 Pattaya	Group All-Around
Gold medal – first place	2022 Pattaya	3 Ribbons + 2 Balls
Silver medal – second place	2022 Pattaya	5 Hoops
Islamic Solidarity Games
Gold medal – first place	2021 Konya	5 Hoops
Silver medal – second place	2021 Konya	Group All-Around
Silver medal – second place	2021 Konya	3 Ribbons + 2 Balls

Mariya Pak (born 19 November 2005) is an Uzbek rhythmic gymnast, member of the national group.

== Career ==
In 2022 Pak entered the senior national group, debuting at the World Cup in Tashkent, winning silver in the All-Around and with 5 hoops as well as gold with 3 ribbons and 2 balls. A week later the group competed in Baku, ending 6th in the All-Around, 7th with 5 hoops and 3 ribbons and 2 balls. In June she took part in the World Cup in Pesaro, taking 8th place in the All-Around and 7th with 5 hoops. She was then selected for the Asian Championships in Pattaya, winning gold in teams, the All-Around and with 3 ribbons and 2 balls and silver with 5 hoops. In August Mariya competed at the 2021 Islamic Solidarity Games in Konya where the group won silver in the All-Around and with 3 ribbons and 2 balls, gold with 5 hoops. In September Pak took part in the World Championships in Sofia along Khurshidabonu Abduraufova, Nargiza Djumaniyazova, Shakhzoda Ibragimova, Nilufar Azamova, Mumtozabonu Iskhokzoda, and the two individuals Takhmina Ikromova and Yosmina Rakhimova, taking 18th place in the All-Around, 13th with 5 hoops and 20th with 3 ribbons + 2 balls.
