= Shakhzoda Ibragimova =

Uzbekistani rhythmic gymnast (born 2002)

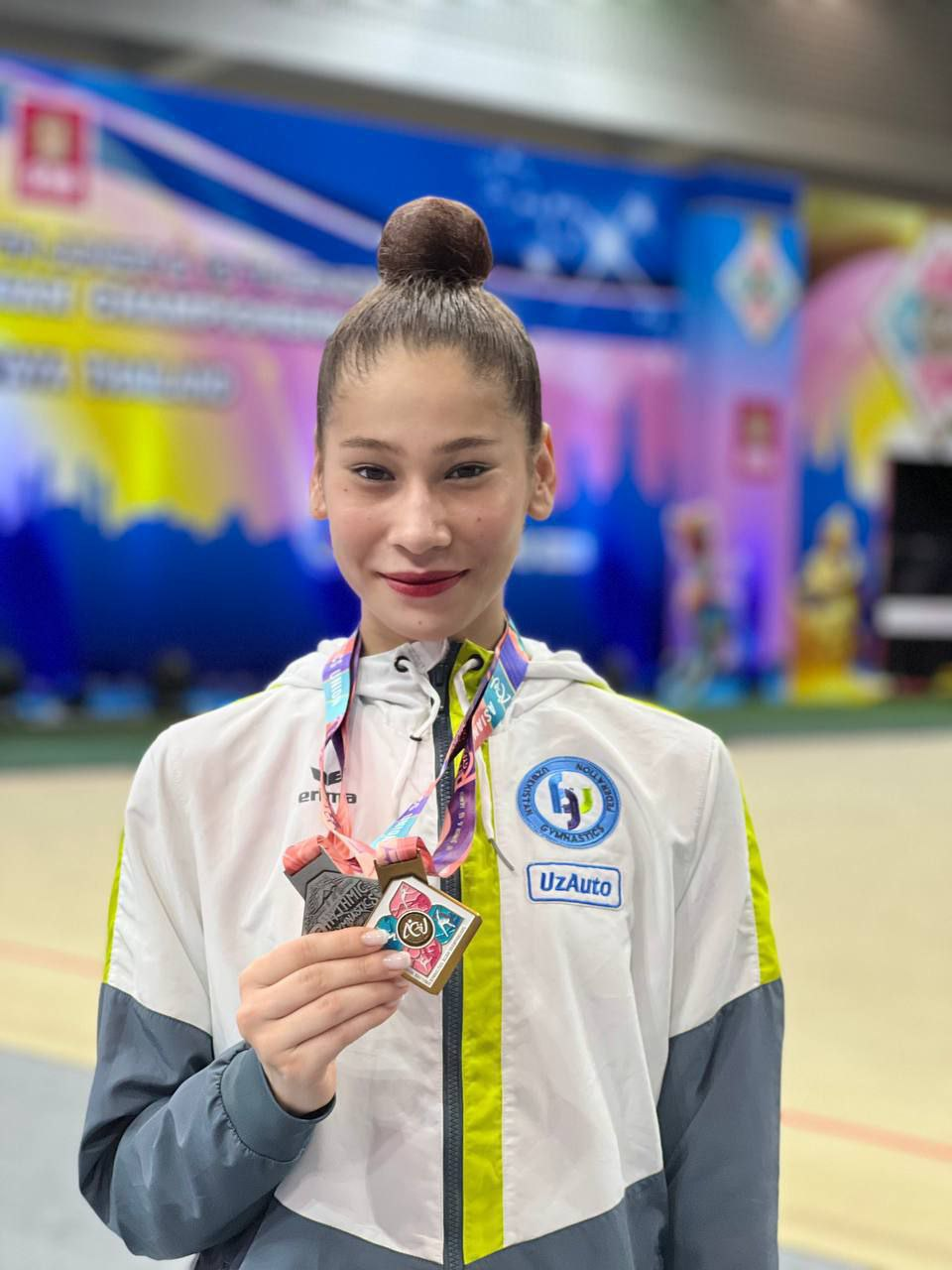

Personal information
- Born: 24 November 2002 (age 23) Nukus, Uzbekistan

Gymnastics career
- Discipline: Rhythmic gymnastics
- Country represented: Uzbekistan; (2022-present)
- Head coach: Rano Mukhamedova
- Assistant coach: Luiza Ganieva
- Choreographer: Maria Akhrarova
Medal record
Rhythmic gymnastics
Representing Uzbekistan
Event	1st	2nd	3rd
Asian Championships	4	4	0
FIG World Cup	1	2	0
Islamic Solidarity Games	1	2	0
Total	6	4	0
Asian Championships
Gold medal – first place	2022 Pattaya	Team
Gold medal – first place	2022 Pattaya	Group All-Around
Gold medal – first place	2022 Pattaya	3 Ribbons + 2 Balls
Gold medal – first place	2024 Tashkent	Group All-Around
Silver medal – second place	2022 Pattaya	5 Hoops
Silver medal – second place	2023 Manila	Group All-Around
Silver medal – second place	2023 Manila	3 Ribbons + 2 Balls
Silver medal – second place	2024 Tashkent	5 Hoops
Islamic Solidarity Games
Gold medal – first place	2021 Konya	5 Hoops
Silver medal – second place	2021 Konya	Group All-Around
Silver medal – second place	2021 Konya	3 Ribbons + 2 Balls

Shakhzoda Ibragimova (born 24 November 2002) is an Uzbekistani rhythmic gymnast who competes as member of the national group.

== Career ==
In 2022, Ibragimova entered the senior national group. She debuted at the World Cup in Tashkent, winning silver in the all-around and with 5 hoops as well as gold with 3 ribbons and 2 balls. A week later, the group competed in Baku, ending 6th in the all-around and 7th with 5 hoops and 3 ribbons and 2 balls. In June she took part in the World Cup in Pesaro, taking 8th place in the all-around and 7th with 5 hoops.

She was then selected for the Asian Championships in Pattaya. She and the other Uzbekistani gymnasts together won gold in the team competition. The group won gold in the all-around and with 3 ribbons and 2 balls, in addition to silver with 5 hoops. In August, Ibragimova competed at the 2021 Islamic Solidarity Games in Konya. The group won silver in the all-around and with 3 ribbons and 2 balls, and they won gold in the 5 hoops final.

In September, Ibragimova took part in the World Championships in Sofia along with her teammates Nilufar Azamova, Nargiza Djumaniyazova, Khurshidabonu Abduraufova, Mumtozabonu Iskhokzoda, Mariya Pak, and the two individuals Takhmina Ikromova and Yosmina Rakhimova. The group was 18th place in the all-around, 13th with 5 hoops and 20th with 3 ribbons + 2 balls.

In 2023, she competed at the Asian Championships in Manila, where she won gold in teams with the other Uzbekistani gymnasts. The group won silver in the all-around and with 3 ribbon & 2 balls. At the World Championships in Valencia, Uzbekistan was 10th in teams. The group ended 15th in the all-around.

In 2024, Ibragimova competed at the World Cup in Tashkent and won a silver medal in the 3 ribbons and 2 balls final. The next week, she participated in the 2024 Asian Championships, where the Uzbekistani group won gold in the all-around. Their placement earned them a berth at the 2024 Summer Olympics.

== Link ==
Official instagram page
