= Nargiza Djumaniyazova =

Uzbekistani rhythmic gymnast (born 2003)

- Born: 28 May 2003 (age 23) Karakalpakstan, Uzbekistan

Gymnastics career
- Discipline: Rhythmic gymnastics
- Country represented: Uzbekistan; (2022-present)
- Head coach: Rano Mukhamedova
- Assistant coach: Luiza Ganieva
- Choreographer: Maria Akhrarova
Medal record
Rhythmic gymnastics
Representing Uzbekistan
Event	1st	2nd	3rd
Asian Championships	4	3	0
FIG World Cup	1	2	0
Islamic Solidarity Games	1	2	0
Total	5	5	0
Asian Championships
Gold medal – first place	2022 Pattaya	Team
Gold medal – first place	2022 Pattaya	Group All-Around
Gold medal – first place	2022 Pattaya	3 Ribbons + 2 Balls
Gold medal – first place	2023 Manila	Team
Silver medal – second place	2022 Pattaya	5 Hoops
Silver medal – second place	2023 Manila	Group All-Around
Silver medal – second place	2023 Manila	3 Ribbons + 2 Balls
Islamic Solidarity Games
Gold medal – first place	2021 Konya	5 Hoops
Silver medal – second place	2021 Konya	Group All-Around
Silver medal – second place	2021 Konya	3 Ribbons + 2 Balls

Nargiza Djumaniyazova (born 28 May 2003) is an Uzbek rhythmic gymnast, member of the national group.

== Career ==
Djumaniyazova took up the sport in 2009. In 2022 she entered the senior national group, debuting at the World Cup in Tashkent, winning silver in the All-Around and with 5 hoops as well as gold with 3 ribbons and 2 balls. A week later the group competed in Baku, ending 6th in the All-Around, 7th with 5 hoops and 3 ribbons and 2 balls. In June she took part in the World Cup in Pesaro, taking 8th place in the All-Around and 7th with 5 hoops. She was then selected for the Asian Championships in Pattaya, winning gold in teams, the All-Around and with 3 ribbons and 2 balls and silver with 5 hoops. In August Nargiza competed at the 2021 Islamic Solidarity Games in Konya where the group won silver in the All-Around and with 3 ribbons and 2 balls, gold with 5 hoops. In September Djumaniyazova took part in the World Championships in Sofia along Nilufar Azamova, Khurshidabonu Abduraufova, Shakhzoda Ibragimova, Mumtozabonu Iskhokzoda, Mariya Pak, and the two individuals Takhmina Ikromova and Yosmina Rakhimova, taking 18th place in the All-Around, 13th with 5 hoops and 20th with 3 ribbons + 2 balls.
