= Aislu Murzagaliyeva =

Kazakh rhythmic gymnast

- Айслу Мурзагалиева (Russian); Айсұлу Мырзағалиева (Kazakh)
- Born: 7 August 2004 (age 22) Sochi, Russia

Gymnastics career
- Discipline: Rhythmic gymnastics
- Country represented: Kazakhstan; (2021–present)
- Club: Specialised Youth Sports School of Olympic Reserve No.1
- Head coach: Elena Fotina
- Assistant coaches: Inna Bystrova, Aliya Yussupova
Medal record
Rhythmic gymnastics
Representing Kazakhstan
Event	1st	2nd	3rd
Asian Championships	1	1	1
FIG World Cup	0	1	3
Islamic Solidarity Games	0	0	2
Total	1	2	6
Asian Championships
Gold medal – first place	2022 Pattaya	5 Hoops
Silver medal – second place	2022 Pattaya	Team
Bronze medal – third place	2022 Pattaya	Group All-Around
Islamic Solidarity Games
Bronze medal – third place	2021 Konya	Group All-Around
Bronze medal – third place	2021 Konya	5 Hoops

Aislu Murzagaliyeva (Russian: Айслу Мурзагалиева, Kazakh: Айсұлу Мырзағалиева, romanized: Aisūlu Myrzağalieva; born 7 August 2004) is a Russian-born Kazakh rhythmic gymnast and member of the national team.

== Personal life ==
Born in Russia, Murzagalieva began the sport at age nine at Olga Struchkova School in Sochi. She moved to Kazakhstan in 2015 in order to train at the Zhuldyz Rhythmic Gymnastics School in Astana.

She is dating Kazakh 2026 Olympic Champion Mikhail Shaidorov.

== Career ==
In 2021, Murzaglieva competed in Kitakyushu for the World Championships where Kazakhstan was 16th in the group All-Around and with 5 balls, 15th with 3 hoops and 4 clubs.

In 2022, the group started at the 2022 World Cup in Athens where she was 4th in the All-Around and with 3 ribbons and 2 balls, winning bronze with 5 hoops. A month later in Tashkent the group won silver in the All-Around and with 3 ribbons and 2 balls as well as bronze with 5 hoops. A week later, she competed in Baku with the group, taking 7th place in the All-Around and won bronze with 3 ribbons and 2 balls. In June, she took part in the World Cup in Pesaro, ending 8th in the All-Around and with 3 balls and 2 balls, 6th with 5 hoops. From June 23 to 26, the group participated at the 2022 Asian Rhythmic Gymnastics Championships in Pattaya, winning gold with 5 hoops, silver in teams and bronze in the group All-Around. In August, Murzagaliyeva competed at the 2021 Islamic Solidarity Games in Konya where the team won bronze in the All-Around and with 5 hoops.
