= Dimie Cat =

French singer and songwriter

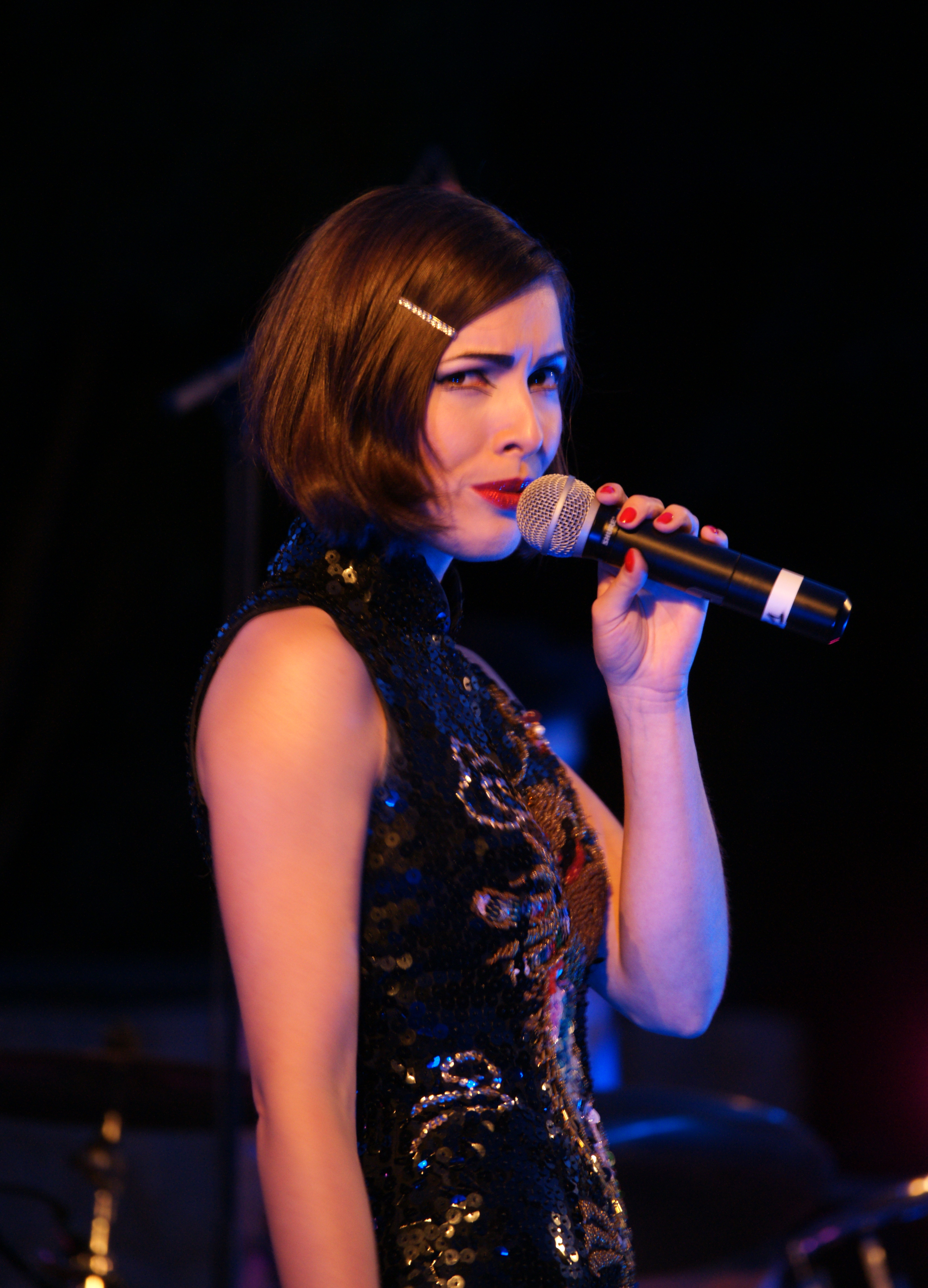
- Dimie Cat at Carros 2014

Background information
- Born: 28 October 1984 (age 41); Lyon, France
- Genres: Electro swing; jazz; nu jazz; swing; cabaret
- Occupations: Singer, songwriter
- Years active: 2009–2015
- Label: Dream'up
- Website: dimiecatmusic.com

Dimie Cat (born 28 October 1984) is a French singer and songwriter.

== Music career ==
In 2007, she met French producer Franck Rougier. Together, they wrote the two albums of Dimie Cat: Pin Me Up and ZigZag and created their own record label Dream'up. Dimie's jazzy vocal style is a mix of early to mid-20th century jazz, combined with modern beats and sounds. Adopting a sample based approach, their usual method is for Franck Rougier to produce the tracks at home and then Dimie Cat writes the words.

Since 2015, Dimie has disappeared from public view and there is no current information on her status.

=== Pin Me Up (2009) ===
Dimie Cat's debut album Pin Me Up (released 22 July 2009), pays a tribute to the pin-up girls and vamps of the Hollywood's Golden Age and to the Swing Era. Two singles are taken from this first opus: Post-it and Glam, that appears on several electro swing compilations.

=== ZigZag (2012) ===
Her follow-up album ZigZag is released digitally 1 November 2012. First single is untitled Ping Pong and a second music video was released in February on track La voiture. One of the songs, Woody Woody, pays a tribute to American director Woody Allen through his film The Curse of the Jade Scorpion. This album insists on the dixieland and electro swing touch, with tracks such as Pasta e Basta, V.E.S.P.A or AAA (Triple A).

ZigZag is promoted in Japan and Korea by Japanese label Rambling Records.

=== Once Upon A Dream (2014) ===
Once Upon A Dream is a Disney-themed electroswing cover album released 23 April 2014 for the Asian market. Ordered by Japanese label Rambling Records, this special album confirms the presence of Dimie Cat in the territory and charted Top 3 of iTunes Japan Jazz Chart from the first week of its release.

== Discography ==
=== Albums ===
- 2009 Pin Me Up (Dream'up)
- 2012 ZigZag (Dream'up)
- 2014 Once Upon a Dream (Rambling)

=== Singles ===
- 2009 "Post-it" (Dream'up)
- 2010 "Glam" (Dream'up)
- 2010 "Christmas Tea" (Dream'up)
- 2012 "Ping Pong" (Dream'up)
- 2013 "La voiture" (Dream'up)
- 2013 "AAA (Triple A)" (Dream'up)
- 2013 "AAA (Triple A) Remixes" (Pashmount)
- 2013 "Le poulpe" (Dream'up)
- 2013 "Montagne russe" (Dream'up)
