= Erika Zhailauova =

Kazakhstani rhythmic gymnast

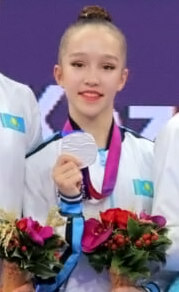
- Born: 4 August 2007 (age 19) Kazakhstan

Gymnastics career
- Discipline: Rhythmic gymnastics
- Country represented: Kazakhstan (2022-2026)
- Head coach: Aliya Yussupova
- Retired: yes
Medal record
Rhythmic gymnastics
Representing Kazakhstan
Event	1st	2nd	3rd
FIG World Cup	0	1	0
Total	0	1	0
Asian Games
Silver medal – second place	2022 Hangzhou	Team
Asian Championships
Gold medal – first place	2022 Pattaya	Team
Silver medal – second place	2022 Pattaya	Ribbon

Erika Zhailauova (Эрика Талгатовна Жайлауовна, born 4 August 2007) is a retired Kazakhstani rhythmic gymnast. She's a multiple Asian Championships medalist.

== Career ==
Erika competed at the 2022 Asian Championships in Pattaya, winning gold in teams and silver with ribbon.

In 2023 she made her senior debut at the World Cup in Baku, being 26th in the All-Around, 29th with hoop, 25th with ball, 27th with clubs and 28th with ribbon. In the last World Cup of the season in Milan she was 20th in the All-Around. In August she was selected for the World Championships in Valencia, she was 13th in teams along Elzhana Taniyeva and the senior group, 19th in the All-Around making her 1st reserve for the final. 20th with hoop, 17th with ball, 17th with clubs and 29th with ribbon.
