= Aidana Shayakhmetova =

Kazakh rhythmic gymnast

- Айдана Шаяхметова
- Born: 16 December 2005 (age 20) Kazakhstan

Gymnastics career
- Discipline: Rhythmic gymnastics
- Country represented: Kazakhstan (2021–present)
- Club: Specialised Youth Sports School of Olympic Reserve No.1
- Head coach: Elena Fotina
- Assistant coaches: Inna Bystrova, Aliya Yussupova
Medal record
Rhythmic gymnastics
Representing Kazakhstan
Event	1st	2nd	3rd
Islamic Solidarity Games	0	0	2
Total	0	0	2
Islamic Solidarity Games
Bronze medal – third place	2021 Konya	Group All-Around
Bronze medal – third place	2021 Konya	5 Hoops

Aidana Şaiahmetova (Note: Often transliterated as Aidana Shayakhmetova through a Russified Romanization) (Kazakh: Айдана Шаяхметова; born 16 December 2005) is a Kazakh rhythmic gymnast, member of the national group.

== Personal life ==
Shayakhmetova took up the sport at age seven, her sister Dayana represented Kazakhstan as a member of the group along her at the 2021 World Championships. She speaks Russian and English.

== Career ==
In 2021, Shayakhmetova entered the rooster of the national senior group, competing at the World Cup in Tashkent, ending 8th in the All-Around, with 5 balls and 3 hoops and 4 clubs. Two weeks later, in Baku, the group was 17th in the All-Around. In October, she competed at the World Championships in Kitakyushu, taking 16th place in the All-Around and with both 5 hoops and 3 hoops and 4 clubs. In August 2022 Aidana competed at the 2021 Islamic Solidarity Games in Konya where the group won bronze in the All-Around and with 5 hoops.
