= Elzhana Taniyeva =

Kazakh rhythmic gymnast

- Елжан Таниева
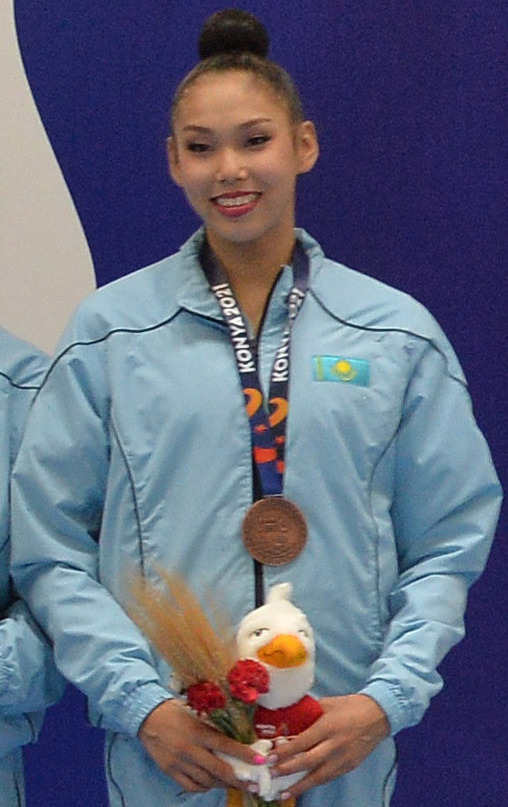
- Taniyeva at the 2021 Islamic Solidarity Games

Personal information
- Born: 6 September 2005 (age 21)

Gymnastics career
- Discipline: Rhythmic gymnastics
- Country represented: Kazakhstan (2019-2024)
- Training location: Shymkent, Kazakhstan
- Head coach: Aliya Yusupova
- Assistant coaches: Lola Adilbekova, Yana Arintseva
- Retired: Yes
Medal record
Rhythmic gymnastics
Representing Kazakhstan
Event	1st	2nd	3rd
Asian Games	0	2	0
Asian Championships	3	7	3
Summer Universiade	0	2	1
FIG World Cup	1	1	3
Islamic Solidarity Games	1	0	3
Total	5	8	8
Asian Games
Silver medal – second place	2022 Hangzhou	All-around
Silver medal – second place	2022 Hangzhou	Team
Asian Championships
Gold medal – first place	2022 Pattaya	Ribbon
Gold medal – first place	2024 Tashkent	All-around
Gold medal – first place	2024 Tashkent	Hoop
Silver medal – second place	2022 Pattaya	Clubs
Silver medal – second place	2022 Pattaya	Team
Silver medal – second place	2023 Manila	All-around
Silver medal – second place	2023 Manila	Hoop
Silver medal – second place	2023 Manila	Ribbon
Silver medal – second place	2023 Manila	Team
Silver medal – second place	2024 Tashkent	Team
Bronze medal – third place	2023 Manila	Ball
Bronze medal – third place	2023 Manila	Clubs
Bronze medal – third place	2024 Tashkent	Ball
World University Games
Silver medal – second place	2021 Chengdu	Ball
Silver medal – second place	2021 Chengdu	Ribbon
Bronze medal – third place	2021 Chengdu	Hoop
Islamic Solidarity Games
Gold medal – first place	2021 Konya	Ball
Bronze medal – third place	2021 Konya	Team
Bronze medal – third place	2021 Konya	Hoop
Bronze medal – third place	2021 Konya	Ribbon

Elzhana Taniyeva (Russian: Эльжана Ергазыкызы Таниева, Kazakh: Елжан Таниева, Eljan Tanieva; born 6 September 2005) is a Kazakh retired rhythmic gymnast. She is the 2024 Asian all-around champion and the 2022 Asian Games all-around and team silver medalist. She won three medals at the 2021 Summer World University Games and four medals at the 2021 Islamic Solidarity Games. Taniyeva competed at the 2024 Summer Olympics in the rhythmic individual all-around.

== Early life ==
Taniyeva took up rhythmic gymnastics at age four, following her older sister. She grew up in Almaty, but at age 10, she moved to Shymkent for her gymnastics training.

== Junior career ==
Taniyeva won gold medals in the all-around, hoop, ball, and ribbon and a silver medal in the clubs at the 2018 Asian Cup. She competed in the 2019 Junior World Championships in Moscow, Russia, finishing 13th with the Kazakhstan team. She qualified for the rope final and finished in fourth place, 0.200 away from the bronze medal.

== Senior career ==
=== 2021 ===
Taniyeva became age-eligible for senior competition in 2021. She took part in the Moscow World Challenge Cup, finishing seventh in the all-around and qualifying for all the event finals. In the event finals, she placed sixth in the hoop and clubs and fifth in the ball and ribbon. Later that year, she was selected to compete at the World Championship in Kitakyushu, Japan, and finished 21st in the all-around during the qualification round.

=== 2022 ===
At the Moscow Grand Prix, Taniyeva won the silver medal in the clubs final behind Russia's Lala Kramarenko. She finished sixth in the hoop final at the Palaio Faliro World Cup. Then at the Marbella Grand Prix, she won the bronze medal in the clubs final behind Bulgarians Stiliana Nikolova and Eva Brezalieva. At her next World Cup in Sofia, she won the bronze medal in the clubs final- her first FIG World Cup medal. Then at the Baku World Cup, she was fourth in the ball final and fifth in the clubs final. At the final World Cup event in Pesaro, she finished fifth in the all-around and in the ribbon final and eighth in the hoop final.

Taniyeva competed at the Asian Championships and won the gold medal in the ribbon final. Additionally, she placed seventh in the all-around and won silver medals in the clubs final and with the Kazakhstan team. She then represented Kazakhstan at the 2021 Islamic Solidarity Games, which were held in 2022 due to the COVID-19 pandemic. She won a bronze medal in the team event alongside Aibota Yertaikyzy. Individually, she won the gold medal in the ball final and bronze medals in the hoop and ribbon finals.

Taniyeva finished 14th in the all-around and seventh in the ribbon final at the World Challenge Cup in Cluj-Napoca. She then competed at the World Championship and qualified for the all-around final, where she finished in eighth place. Additionally, the Kazakhstan team finished 13th.

=== 2023 ===
Taniyeva began the 2023 season at the Miss Valentine Tartu Grand Prix and won a silver medal in the hoop final behind Ukraine's Viktoriia Onopriienko. Then at the Marbella Grand Prix, she won a bronze medal in the ball final behind Bulgarian gymnasts Stiliana Nikolova and Eva Brezalieva, and she placed fourth in the all-around. She then competed at the Palaio Faliro World Cup and finished 11th in the all-around. The day after, she won a bronze medal in the clubs final and placed fourth in the ribbon final. At the Sofia World Cup, she ended fifth place in the all-around, and she won a silver medal in the ribbon final. Then at the Tashkent World Cup, she placed sixth in the all-around, seventh in the ball final, and fifth in the clubs final. She won the gold medal in the ball final at the Portimão World Challenge Cup, and she won a bronze medal in the ribbon final.

Taniyeva won the silver medal in the all-around at the Asian Championships behind Uzbekistan's Takhmina Ikromova. In the event finals, she won silver medals in the hoop and ribbon and bronze medals in the ball and clubs, and she helped the Kazakh team win the silver medal. She then won three medals at the World University Games- silver with the ball and ribbon and bronze with the hoop. Then at the Asian Games, she won the all-around silver medal once again behind Ikromova. She also won a silver medal in the team event alongside Milana Parfilova and Erika Zhailauova. At the World Championship, she qualified for the ball final and finished seventh.

=== 2024 ===
Taniyeva won the gold medal in the ball final at the Marbella Grand Prix. She finished fifth in the all-around at the Sofia World Cup. At the Asian Championships, Taniyeva won the all-around title. Her placement gave her an individual berth to compete at the 2024 Summer Olympics. In the event finals, she won the gold medal in the hoop and the bronze medal in the ball.

In August, Taniyeva competed at the 2024 Summer Olympics. She had a loss in her ball routine and ended the qualification round in 13th place; she did not advance to the final.

Taniyeva announced her retirement in January 2025.

== Competitive history ==
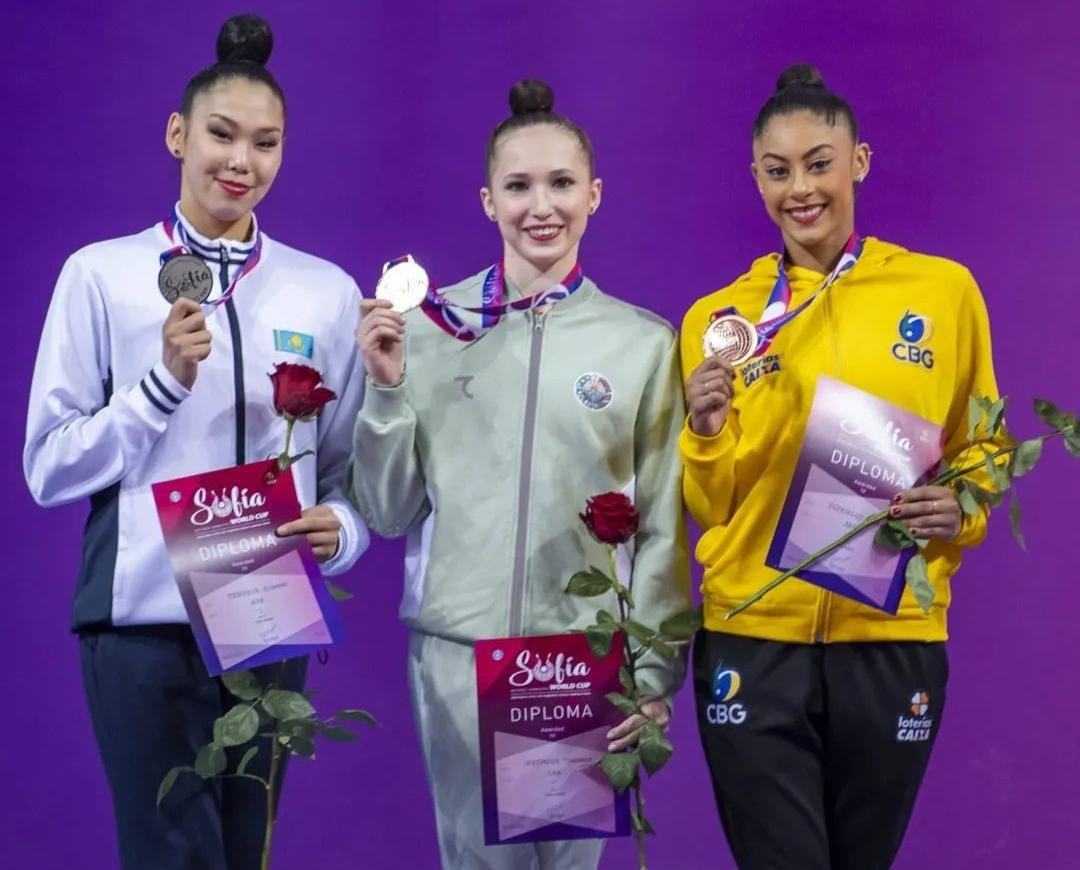
Taniyeva (left) at the 2023 Sofia World Cup

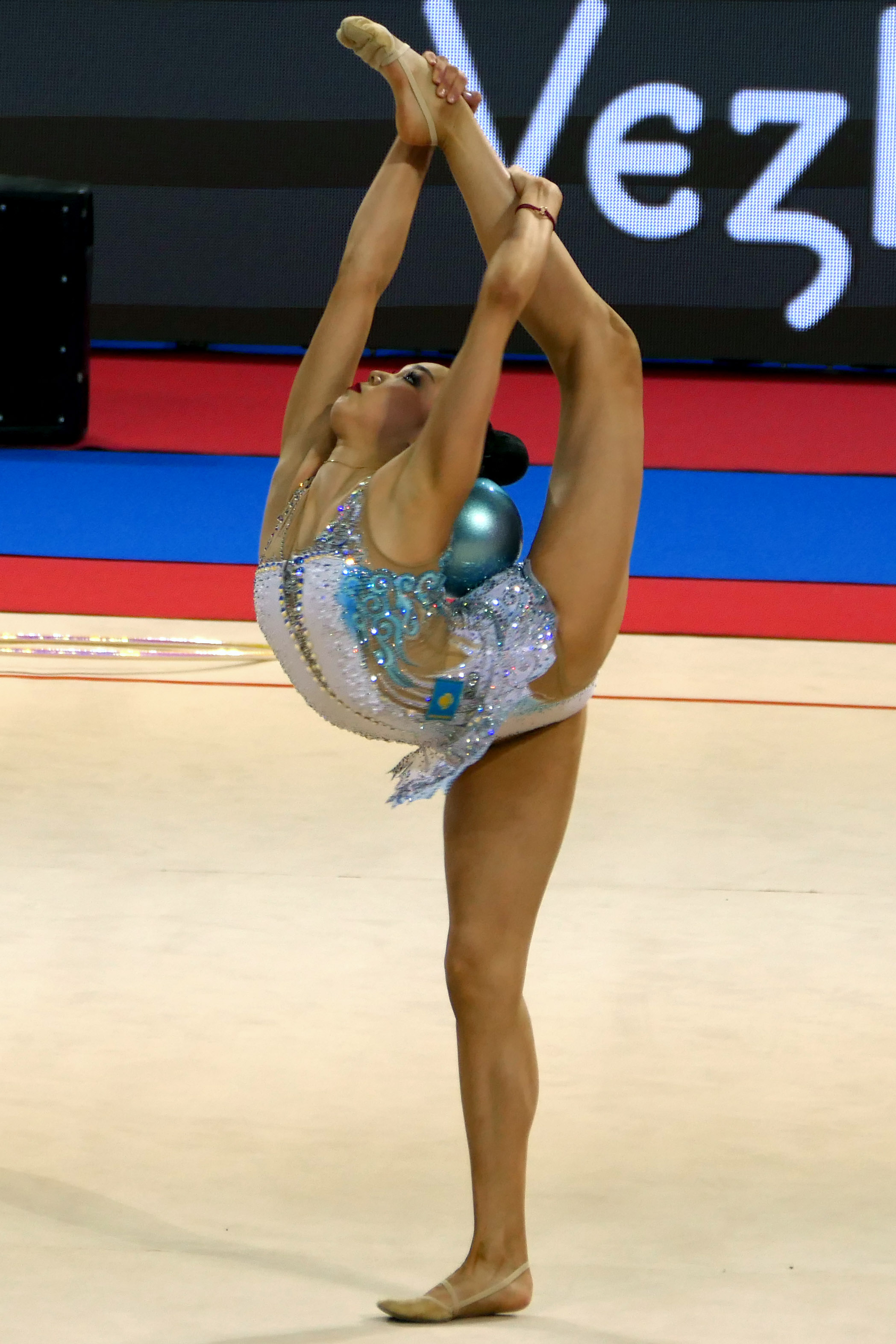
Taniyeva competing ball at the 2024 Sofia World Cup

Year	Event	Team	AA	HP	BA	CL	RB
Junior
2018	Asian Cup		1st place, gold medalist(s)	1st place, gold medalist(s)	2nd place, silver medalist(s)	1st place, gold medalist(s)	1st place, gold medalist(s)
Year	Event	Team	AA	RP	BA	CL	RB
2019
2019	Junior World Championships	13		4			
Year	Event	Team	AA	HP	BA	CL	RB
Senior
2021	Moscow World Challenge Cup		7	6	5	6	5
2021	World Championship		21				
2022	Moscow Grand Prix					2nd place, silver medalist(s)	
2022	Palaio Faliro World Cup		17	6			
2022	Marbella Grand Prix		8		5	3rd place, bronze medalist(s)	
2022	Sofia World Cup		7	5	5	3rd place, bronze medalist(s)	
2022	Baku World Cup		15		4	5	
2022	Pesaro World Cup		5	8			5
2022	Asian Championships	2nd place, silver medalist(s)	7			2nd place, silver medalist(s)	1st place, gold medalist(s)
2022	Islamic Solidarity Games	3rd place, bronze medalist(s)		3rd place, bronze medalist(s)	1st place, gold medalist(s)	6	3rd place, bronze medalist(s)
2022	Cluj-Napoca World Challenge Cup		14		4	5	
2022	World Championship	13	8				
2023	Miss Valentine Tartu Grand Prix		9	2nd place, silver medalist(s)		4	6
2023	Marbella Grand Prix		4	6	3rd place, bronze medalist(s)	7	
2023	Palaio Faliro World Cup		11			3rd place, bronze medalist(s)	4
2023	Sofia World Cup		5		5	7	2nd place, silver medalist(s)
2023	Tashkent World Cup		6		7	5	
2023	Portimão World Challenge Cup		4	4	1st place, gold medalist(s)		3rd place, bronze medalist(s)
2023	Asian Championships	2nd place, silver medalist(s)	2nd place, silver medalist(s)	2nd place, silver medalist(s)	3rd place, bronze medalist(s)	3rd place, bronze medalist(s)	2nd place, silver medalist(s)
2023	World University Games		5	3rd place, bronze medalist(s)	2nd place, silver medalist(s)		2nd place, silver medalist(s)
2023	Asian Games	2nd place, silver medalist(s)	2nd place, silver medalist(s)				
2023	World Championship	13	26		7		
2024	Marbella Grand Prix		5	8	1st place, gold medalist(s)	4	4
2024	Sofia World Cup		5			4	7
2024	Asian Championships	2nd place, silver medalist(s)	1st place, gold medalist(s)	1st place, gold medalist(s)	3rd place, bronze medalist(s)	5	4
2024	Olympic Games		R3				

== Routine music information ==
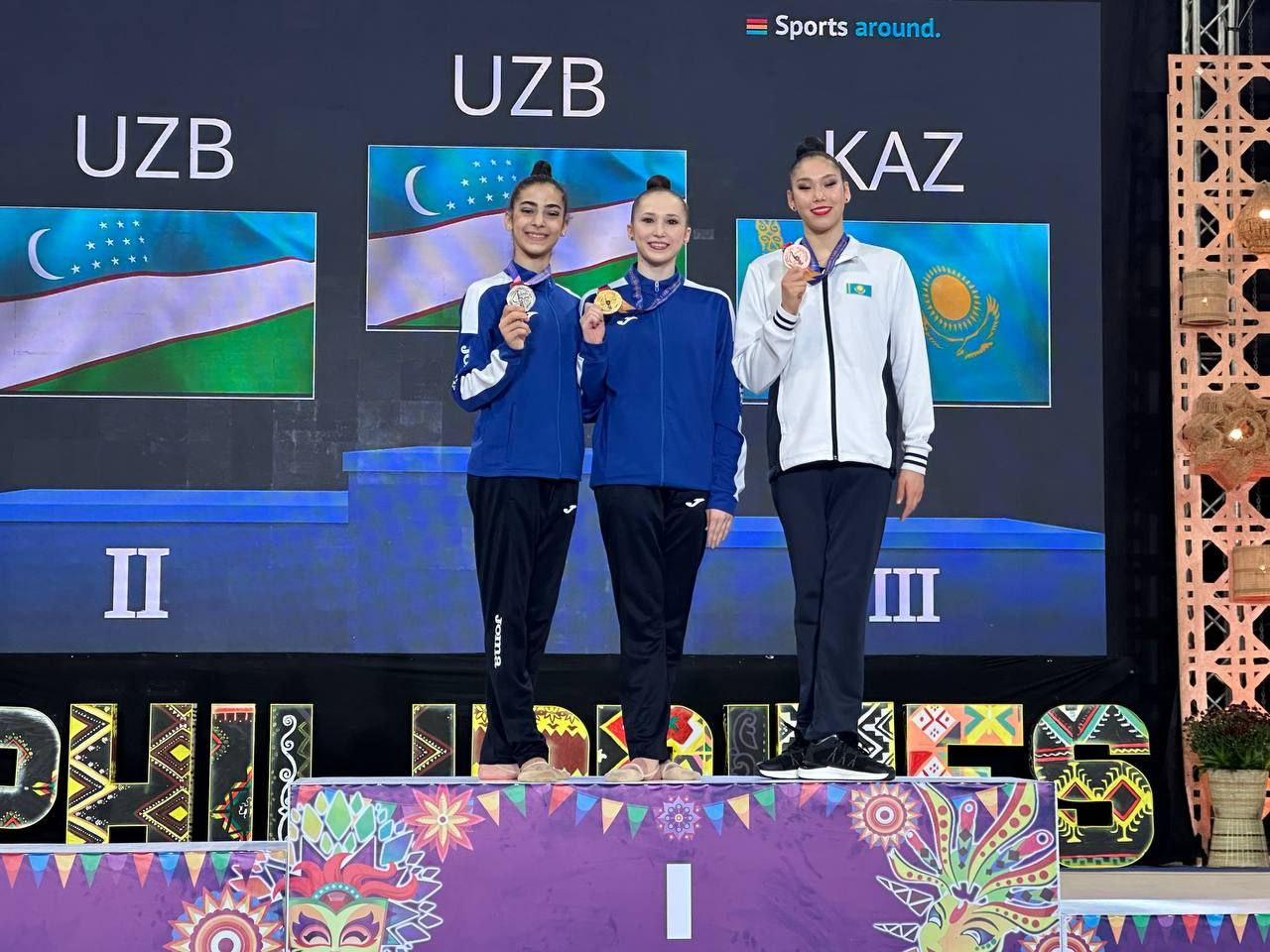
Taniyeva (right) at the 2023 Asian Championships

Year	Apparatus	Music title
2019	Rope	The Dark Game by Neil Black
2019	Ball	Le Poulpe by Dimie Cat
2019	Clubs	Puerto Rico by The Rumbar
2019	Ribbon	V.E.S.P.A by Dimie Cat
2021	Hoop	No Good by KALEO
2021	Ball	I Put A Spell On You by Garou
2021	Clubs	Natural by Imagine Dragons
2021	Ribbon	Obsidian (No Drums) by Audiomachine
2022	Hoop	Navras by Juno Reactor
2022	Ball	It's a Man's Man's Man's World by James Brown
2022	Clubs	Run the World (Girls) by Beyoncé
2022	Ribbon	Cleopatra by Trevor Jones
2023	Hoop	War from The Turkish Gambit OST
2023	Ball	Speak Softly Love by Simone
2023	Clubs	Loca by Shakira
2023	Ribbon	Heed: Of Penetration And The City Dweller - Head Remix by Julian Cope, Clubbed to Death from Matrix OST
2024	Hoop	Beneath the Floorboards / V for Vivaldi (feat. Sebastián Pecznik & Duomo) by Power-Haus
2024	Ball	Speak Softly Love by Simone
2024	Clubs	Sueta by AlexEmelya, Maga
2024	Ribbon	Heed: Of Penetration And The City Dweller - Head Remix by Julian Cope, Clubbed to Death from Matrix OST
