= Yosmina Rakhimova =

Uzbekistani rhythmic gymnast

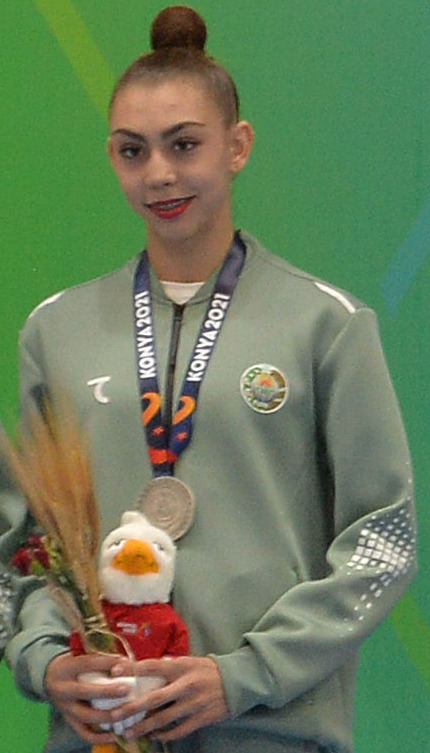
- Born: 25 August 2006 (age 20) Tashkent, Uzbekistan

Gymnastics career
- Discipline: Rhythmic gymnastics
- Country represented: Uzbekistan; (2019-)
- Head coach: Irina Kudryasheva
Medal record
Rhythmic gymnastics
Representing Uzbekistan
Event	1st	2nd	3rd
Asian Championships	1	0	0
Islamic Solidarity Games	1	0	0
Total	2	0	0
Asian Championships
Gold medal – first place	2022 Pattaya	Team
Gold medal – first place	2023 Manila	Team
Silver medal – second place	2023 Manila	Clubs
Bronze medal – third place	2023 Manila	Ribbon
Islamic Solidarity Games
Gold medal – first place	2021 Konya	Team

Yosmina Rakhimova (born 25 August 2006) is an Uzbek rhythmic gymnast. She represent her country in international competitions.

== Personal life ==
Yosmina got involved in the sport in 2010, at age four, in Tashkent. Her dream is to win a gold medal at the Olympic Games like her idols Alina Kabaeva and Margarita Mamun.

== Career ==
Rakhimova debuted at the 1st Junior World Championships in Moscow, placing 11th in teams, 30th with ball and 6th in the ball final.

She became senior in 2022, being selected for the Asian Championships in Pattaya, winning gold in teams. In August Rakhimova competed at the 2021 Islamic Solidarity Games in Konya where she won again gold in teams. In September Yosmina took part in the World Championships in Sofia along Takhmina Ikromova and the senior group, taking 21st place in the All-Around, 25th with hoop, 23rd with ball and 9th with ribbon.
