= Ofir Shaham =

Israeli rhythmic gymnast

- אופיר שחם
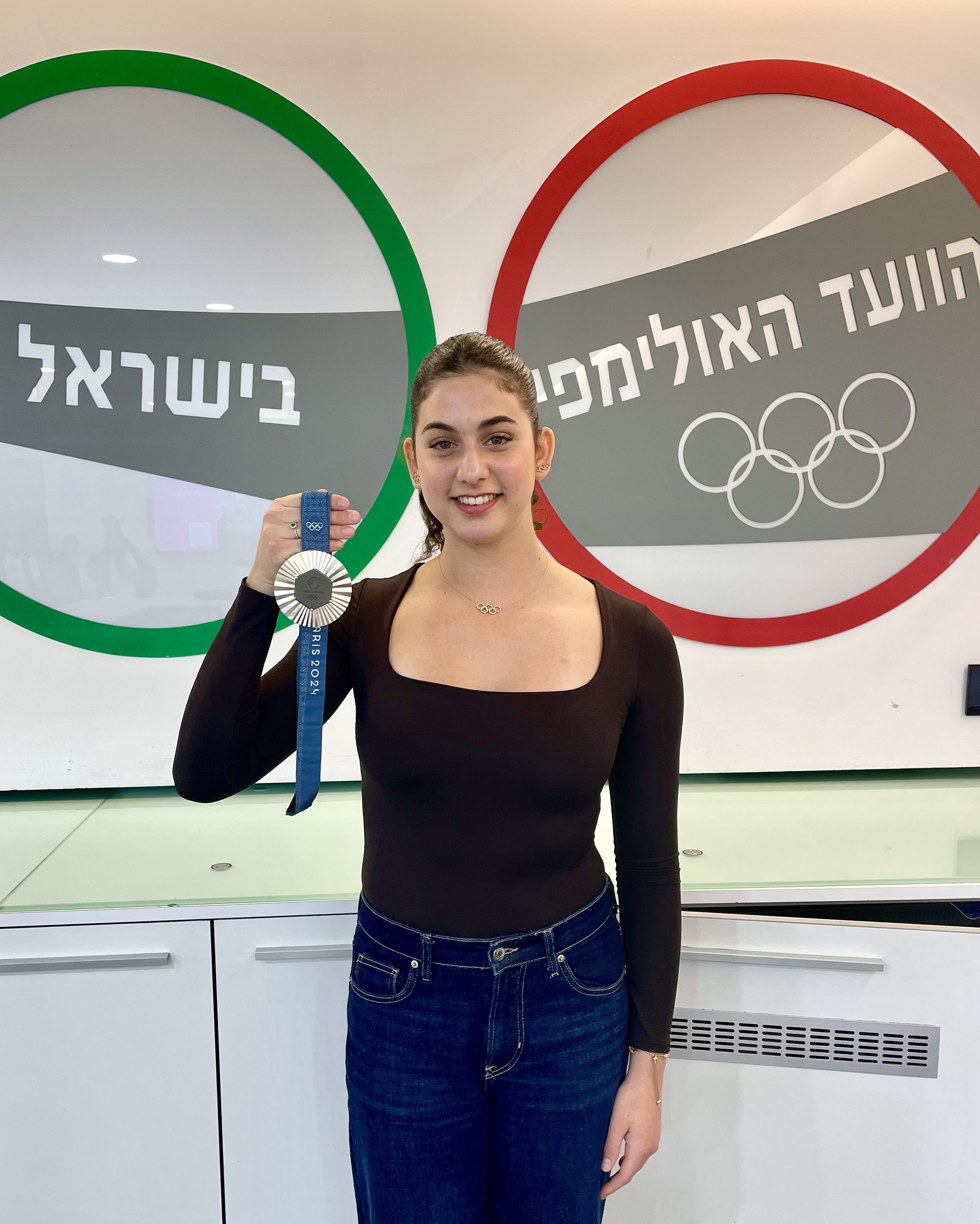
- Shaham at the Israeli Olympic Committee offices, November 2025, presenting the medal she was awarded
- Born: 23 November 2004 (age 21) Zikhron Ya'akov, Israel

Gymnastics career
- Discipline: Rhythmic gymnastics
- Country represented: Israel (2022–2024)
- Club: Ironi Netanya
- Head coach: Ayelet Zussman
- Assistant coach: Linoy Ashram
- Former coach: Ilana Brenner
- Retired: Yes
Medal record
Rhythmic Gymnastics
Representing Israel
| Event | 1st | 2nd | 3rd |
|---|---|---|---|
| FIG World Cup | 6 | 6 | 2 |
| European Championships | 2 | 4 | 4 |
| World Championships | 2 | 2 | 0 |
| Total | 10 | 12 | 6 |
Olympic Games
| Silver medal – second place | 2024 Paris | Group all-around |
World Championships
| Gold medal – first place | 2023 Valencia | Group All-Around |
| Gold medal – first place | 2023 Valencia | 3 Ribbons + 2 Balls |
| Silver medal – second place | 2022 Sofia | Group All-Around |
| Silver medal – second place | 2022 Sofia | 5 Hoops |
European Championships
| Gold medal – first place | 2022 Tel Aviv | Group All-Around |
| Gold medal – first place | 2023 Baku | 5 Hoops |
| Silver medal – second place | 2022 Tel Aviv | 5 Hoops |
| Silver medal – second place | 2023 Baku | Group All-Around |
| Silver medal – second place | 2023 Baku | 3 Ribbons + 2 Balls |
| Silver medal – second place | 2024 Budapest | 3 Ribbons + 2 Balls |
| Bronze medal – third place | 2022 Tel Aviv | Team |
| Bronze medal – third place | 2023 Baku | Team |
| Bronze medal – third place | 2024 Budapest | Team |
| Bronze medal – third place | 2024 Budapest | 5 Hoops |
European Cup
| Gold medal – first place | 2024 Baku | All-around |
| Gold medal – first place | 2024 Baku | 5 Hoops |

Ofir Shaham (Hebrew: אופיר שחם; born 23 November 2004) is a retired Israeli team world champion rhythmic gymnast. She won a 2022 European Championship gold medal in the group All-Around, and a 2022 World Championships silver medal in the same category. The following year at the 2023 World Championships, she won two team gold medals, one in the Group All-Around and one in the 3 Ribbons + 2 Balls. Shaham represented Israel at the 2024 Paris Olympics in the Women's rhythmic team all-around, in which Team Israel won the silver medal.

== Early life ==
Shaham's hometown is the town of Zikhron Ya'akov in Israel. She studied at the Moshav High School.

== Rhythmic gymnastics career ==
Shaham began the sport at age nine, when in search of a dance class she arrived at the sports hall in Zikhron Ya'akov where rhythmic gymnasts trained. She was drawn to the combination of gymnastics, dance, apparatus, and flashy clothes. Ilana Brenner was her first coach.

After she won an Israeli championship at age 12, she decided that she wanted to go as far as possible in the sport. Her club is Ironi Netanya. Her ultimate dream is to compete at the 2024 Olympic Games, and her idol is Israeli three-time Olympian rhythmic gymnast Neta Rivkin.

=== 2021–22; European champion ===
In September 2021 auditions for the new Israeli national group began, and about 30 girls from all over the country auditioned. The qualifiers were physically and mentally difficult, and gymnasts were eliminated until nine gymnasts remained. Since January 2022 Shaham trains for 11 hours a day, 6 days a week, at the Wingate Institute in Israel.

The team debuted at the 2022 World Cup in Athens, Greece, in March, winning gold in 5 hoops and 3 ribbons + 2 balls. Then in the 2022 Baku World Cup in Azerbaijan in April they won the bronze medal in the All-Around and 5 hoops. At the 2022 Pamplona World Cup in Spain in May they won All-Around silver, at the 2022 Portimão World Cup in Portugal in May they won the All-Around gold, and at the 2022 Cluj-Napoca World Cup in Romania in August they won the All-Around and 5 hoops silver.

In June 2022 Shaham competed in the 2022 European Championships in Tel Aviv, Israel, where the group won the All-Around gold medal ahead of Italy, and won the silver medal with 5 hoops, as well as the bronze medal in the senior team category. She competed along with teammates Adar Friedmann, Amit Hedvat, Romi Paritzki, Shani Bakanov, Diana Svertsov, and in the individuals Daria Atamanov and Adi Asya Katz.

In September 2022 Shaham competed in the 2022 World Championships in Sofia, Bulgaria, along with Adar Friedmann, Romi Paritzki, Diana Svertsov, and Diana Svertsov, winning two silver medals, one in the All-Around and one in the 5 hoops' final. Despite being among the favourites for a team medal, Israel was not able to take part in the competition because Atamanov broke her foot the day before the competition started and replacements had to be announced at least 24 hours before competition, leaving the country with only Katz in the individual event. In Sofia they won silver in the All-Around and with 5 hoops.

=== 2023; two World championships ===
In 2023 at the first World Cup of the season in Athens, Greece, in March the group won gold in the All-Around and with 5 hoops, as well as silver with 3 ribbons + 2 balls. In the 2023 Sofia World Cup in Bulgaria, they won two silver medals, one in the All-Around and one with 5 hoops. In July 2023, with Team Israel at the Milan World Cup in Italy, Shaham won a silver medal in the All-Around, as Italy won the gold medal.

In May 2023 at the 2023 European Championships in Baku, Azerbaijan, she and Team Israel won a silver medal in Group All-Around and a bronze medal in Team.

In August 2023 at the 2023 World Championships in Valencia, Spain, Shaham won two team gold medals, one in the Group All-Around and one in the 3 Ribbons + 2 Balls. Her teammates were Shani Bakanov, Eliza Banchuk, Adar Friedmann, Romi Paritzki, and Diana Svertsov. It was Israel's first group rhythmic gymnastics World Championships gold medal.

=== 2024–present; Paris Olympics silver medal ===
Shaham represented Israel at the 2024 Paris Olympics in the Women's rhythmic team all-around, in which Team Israel won the silver medal.
