= Amit Hedvat =

Israeli rhythmic gymnast

- עמית חדוות
- Born: 2004 (age 21–22) Israel

Gymnastics career
- Discipline: Rhythmic gymnastics
- Country represented: Israel (2019-)
- Club: Maccabi Tel Aviv Rhythmic Gymnastics
- Head coach: Ayelet Zussman
Medal record
Rhythmic Gymnastics
Representing Israel
Event	1st	2nd	3rd
Junior World Championships	0	0	2
Junior European Championships	0	1	0
FIG World Cup	4	3	2
European Championships	1	1	0
Total	5	5	4
Junior World Championships
Bronze medal – third place	2019 Moscow	Team
Bronze medal – third place	2019 Moscow	5 Ribbons
Junior European Championships
Silver medal – second place	2019 Baku	5 Ribbons
European Championships
Gold medal – first place	2022 Tel Aviv	Group All-Around
Silver medal – second place	2022 Tel Aviv	5 Hoops

Amit Hedvat (Hebrew: עמית חדוות; born 2004) is a retired Israeli rhythmic gymnast. She won gold in the group All-Around at the 2022 European Championship and silver in the same category at the 2022 World Championships.

== Rhythmic gymnastics career ==
=== Junior ===
Hedvat was part of the national junior group for the 2019 European and World Championships, the group composed of Amit, Romi Paritzki, Emili Malka, Mishel Mialitz, Diana Svertsov won European silver with 5 ribbons, as well as world's team and 5 ribbons bronze.

=== Senior ===
In 2022 Amit was named part of Israel's new national group, they debuted at the World Cup in Athens, winning gold in 5 hoops and 3 ribbons + 2 balls. Then Baku, where they got bronze in the All-Around and 5 hoops. Pamplona (All-Around silver), Portimão (All-Around gold) and Cluj-Napoca (All-Around and 5 hoops silver).

In June she participated in the European Championships in Tel Aviv, where the group won the All-Around and got silver with 5 hoops as well as the bronze medal in the senior team category along with teammates Shani Bakanov, Adar Friedmann, Romi Paritzki, Diana Svertsov, Ofir Shaham, and the individuals Daria Atamanov and Adi Asya Katz.

Shortly after the European Championships Amit retired from the sport.

== See also ==
- List of medalists at the Rhythmic Gymnastics Junior European Championships
