= Adar Friedmann =

Israeli rhythmic gymnast

- הדר פרידמן
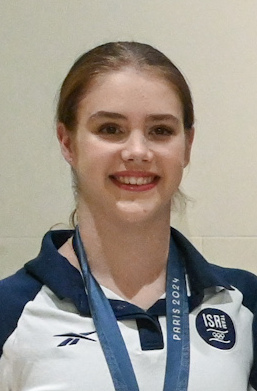
- Born: 18 July 2006 (age 20) Israel

Gymnastics career
- Discipline: Rhythmic gymnastics
- Country represented: Israel; (2022-2024)
- Club: Maccabi Makefet Petah Tikva
- Head coach: Ayelet Zussman
- Assistant coach: Natasha Asmolov
- Retired: Yes
Medal record
Rhythmic Gymnastics
Representing Israel
| Event | 1st | 2nd | 3rd |
|---|---|---|---|
| FIG World Cup | 6 | 6 | 2 |
| European Championships | 2 | 4 | 4 |
| World Championships | 2 | 2 | 0 |
| Total | 10 | 12 | 6 |
Olympic Games
| Silver medal – second place | 2024 Paris | Group all-around |
World Championships
| Gold medal – first place | 2023 Valencia | Group All-Around |
| Gold medal – first place | 2023 Valencia | 3 Ribbons + 2 Balls |
| Silver medal – second place | 2022 Sofia | Group All-Around |
| Silver medal – second place | 2022 Sofia | 5 Hoops |
European Championships
| Gold medal – first place | 2022 Tel Aviv | Group All-Around |
| Gold medal – first place | 2023 Baku | 5 Hoops |
| Silver medal – second place | 2022 Tel Aviv | 5 Hoops |
| Silver medal – second place | 2023 Baku | Group All-Around |
| Silver medal – second place | 2023 Baku | 3 Ribbons + 2 Balls |
| Silver medal – second place | 2024 Budapest | 3 Ribbons + 2 Balls |
| Bronze medal – third place | 2022 Tel Aviv | Team |
| Bronze medal – third place | 2023 Baku | Team |
| Bronze medal – third place | 2024 Budapest | Team |
| Bronze medal – third place | 2024 Budapest | 5 Hoops |
European Cup
| Gold medal – first place | 2024 Baku | All-around |
| Gold medal – first place | 2024 Baku | 5 Hoops |

Adar Friedmann (Hebrew: הדר פרידמן; born 18 July 2006) is a retired Israeli rhythmic gymnast. She won gold in the group All-Around at the 2022 European Championship and the silver medal in the same category at the 2022 World Championships. She represented Israel at the 2024 Paris Olympics in the Women's rhythmic team all-around, in which Team Israel won the silver medal.

== Personal life ==
Friedmann was born in Israel to parents who made Aliyah from Romania in 2001. She took up gymnastics at age seven, and said that: "personally, I have always loved gymnastics. Not everyone can reach a high level, it's very special". Her idol is Israeli rhythmic gymnast Linoy Ashram.

== Rhythmic gymnastics career ==
=== 2022 ===
In 2022 Friedmann was named part of Israel's new national group, training for most of the day, which is more than 10 hours, thinking that they have to go to training and work harder than yesterday. They debuted at the World Cup in Athens, winning gold in 5 hoops and 3 ribbons + 2 balls. Then Baku, where they got the bronze medal in the All-Around and 5 hoops. Pamplona (All-Around silver), Portimão (All-Around gold) and Cluj-Napoca (All-Around and 5 hoops silver).

In June she participated in the European Championships in Tel Aviv, where the group won the All-Around and got the silver medal with 5 hoops as well as the bronze medal in the senior team category along with teammates Shani Bakanov, Amit Hedvat, Romi Paritzki, Ofir Shaham, Diana Svertsov and the individuals Daria Atamanov and Adi Asya Katz.

In September Adar took part in the World Championships in Sofia along Shani Bakanov, Romi Paritzki, Ofir Shaham and Diana Svertsov, winning two silver medals in the All-Around and the 5 hoops' final. Despite being among the favourites for a team medal, Israel couldn't take part in the competition because Atamanov broke her foot the day before the competition started and, as replacements had to be announced at least 24 hours before competition, leaving the country with only Katz as individual.

=== 2023 ===
In 2023 at the first World Cup of the season in Athens the group won gold in the All-Around and with 5 hoops as well as silver with 3 ribbons + 2 balls. In Sofia they won silver in the All-Around and with 5 hoops.

=== 2024 Paris Olympics silver medal ===
She represented Israel at the 2024 Paris Olympics in the Women's rhythmic team all-around, in which Team Israel won the silver medal.
