= Shani Bakanov =

Israeli rhythmic gymnast

- שני בקנוב
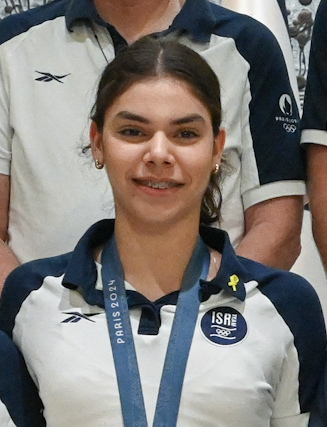
- Born: 27 February 2006 (age 20) Haifa, Israel

Gymnastics career
- Discipline: Rhythmic gymnastics
- Country represented: Israel; (2021-2024)
- Club: Maccabi Haifa
- Head coach: Ayelet Zussman
- Retired: Yes
Medal record
Rhythmic Gymnastics
Representing Israel
Event	1st	2nd	3rd
FIG World Cup	6	6	2
European Championships	2	4	4
World Championships	2	2	0
Junior European Championships	0	0	2
Total	10	12	8
Olympic Games
Silver medal – second place	2024 Paris	Group all-around
World Championships
Gold medal – first place	2023 Valencia	Group All-Around
Gold medal – first place	2023 Valencia	3 Ribbons + 2 Balls
Silver medal – second place	2022 Sofia	Group All-Around
Silver medal – second place	2022 Sofia	5 Hoops
European Championships
Gold medal – first place	2022 Tel Aviv	Group All-Around
Gold medal – first place	2023 Baku	5 Hoops
Silver medal – second place	2022 Tel Aviv	5 Hoops
Silver medal – second place	2023 Baku	Group All-Around
Silver medal – second place	2023 Baku	3 Ribbons + 2 Balls
Silver medal – second place	2024 Budapest	3 Ribbons + 2 Balls
Bronze medal – third place	2022 Tel Aviv	Team
Bronze medal – third place	2023 Baku	Team
Bronze medal – third place	2024 Budapest	Team
Bronze medal – third place	2024 Budapest	5 Hoops
Junior European Championships
Bronze medal – third place	2021 Varna	All-Around
Bronze medal – third place	2021 Varna	5 Ribbons
European Cup
Gold medal – first place	2024 Baku	All-around
Gold medal – first place	2024 Baku	5 Hoops

Shani Bakanov (Hebrew: שני בקנוב; born 27 February 2006) is a retired Israeli world champion rhythmic gymnast. She won the gold medal in the group All-Around at the 2022 European Championship, and the silver medal in the same category at the 2022 World Championships. She won two gold medals at the 2023 Rhythmic Gymnastics World Championships. She represented Israel at the 2024 Paris Olympics in the Women's rhythmic team all-around, in which Team Israel won the silver medal.

== Early and personal life ==
Bakanov was born in Haifa, Israel, and is Jewish. Her parents immigrated to Israel from Belarus. She is a student at Leo Baeck High School in Haifa. She lives in the Neve David neighborhood in Haifa, with her mother, who works as a cleaner, and her sister in a small 33 square meter (355 square foot) apartment. She speaks Hebrew and English.

== Rhythmic gymnastics career ==
Bakanov began the sport at age four at the Maccabi Haifa Carmel club in Israel, and Maccabi Haifa remains her club. Her coach is Ayelet Zussman. She trains at the Wingate Institute 11 hours a day, six days a week, taking one day a week off to study. She speaks Hebrew and English.

=== Junior; European Championship bronze medals ===
In 2021 Shani was part of the junior group along with Eliza Banchuk, Alona Hillel, Emili Malka. and Simona Rudnik, that won bronze medals in the All-Around and with 5 ribbons at the European Championships in Varna, Bulgaria.

=== 2022; European champion ===
In 2022 she was named part of Israel's new national group. They debuted at the World Cup in Athens, winning gold medals in 5 hoops and 3 ribbons + 2 balls. Then Baku, where they got bronze in the All-Around and 5 hoops. Pamplona (All-Around silver medal), Portimão (All-Around gold) and Cluj-Napoca (All-Around and 5 hoops silver).

In June she competed in the European Championships in Tel Aviv, where the group won the All-Around and got silver with 5 hoops as well as the bronze medal in the senior team category along with teammates Adar Friedmann, Amit Hedvat, Romi Paritzki, Ofir Shaham, Diana Svertsov, and the individuals Daria Atamanov and Adi Asya Katz.

In September, she competed in the World Championships in Sofia along Adar Friedmann, Romi Paritzki, Ofir Shaham, and Diana Svertsov, winning two silver medals in the All-Around and the 5 hoops' final. Despite being among the favourites for a team medal, Israel couldn't take part in the competition because Atamanov broke her foot the day before the competition started and, as replacements had to be announced at least 24 hours before competition, leaving the country with only Katz as individual.

=== 2023; World champion ===
In 2023 at the first World Cup of the season in Athens the group won gold in the All-Around and with 5 hoops as well as silver with 3 ribbons + 2 balls. In Sofia they won silver in the All-Around and with 5 hoops.

In May 2023 at the 2023 Rhythmic Gymnastics European Championships in Baku, Azerbaijan, she won a gold medal in Group Hoop, silver medals in Group and Group Ball, Ribbon, and a bronze medal in Team.

In August 2023 at the 2023 Rhythmic Gymnastics World Championships in Valencia, Spain, she won gold medals in Group and Group Ball, Ribbon. She said: "I probably cried the most out of all of them, when we stood on top of the podium. We are world champions, it's unbelievable."

=== 2024–present; Paris Olympics silver medal ===
In May 2024 at the 2024 Rhythmic Gymnastics European Championships in Budapest, Hungary, she won a silver medal in Group Ball, Ribbon, and a bronze medal in Group Hoop. That same month, at the 2024 Rhythmic Gymnastics European Cup, she won gold medals in All-Around and 5 Hoops.

She represented Israel at the 2024 Paris Olympics in the Women's rhythmic team all-around, in which Team Israel won the silver medal.

== See also ==
- List of medalists at the Rhythmic Gymnastics Junior European Championships
- List of select Jewish gymnasts
