= Romi Paritzki =

Israeli rhythmic gymnast

- רומי פריצקי
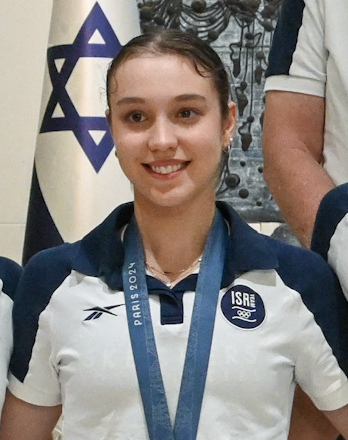
- Born: 17 June 2004 (age 22) Israel

Gymnastics career
- Discipline: Rhythmic gymnastics
- Country represented: Israel; (2019-2024)
- Club: Maccabi Tel Aviv Rhythmic Gymnastics
- Head coaches: Alona Koshevatskiy and Ayelet Zussman
- Retired: Yes
Medal record
Rhythmic Gymnastics
Representing Israel
Event	1st	2nd	3rd
Junior World Championships	0	0	2
Junior European Championships	0	1	0
FIG World Cup	6	6	2
European Championships	2	4	4
World Championships	2	2	0
Total	10	13	8
Olympic Games
Silver medal – second place	2024 Paris	Group all-around
World Championships
Gold medal – first place	2023 Valencia	Group All-Around
Gold medal – first place	2023 Valencia	3 Ribbons + 2 Balls
Silver medal – second place	2022 Sofia	Group All-Around
Silver medal – second place	2022 Sofia	5 Hoops
European Championships
Gold medal – first place	2022 Tel Aviv	Group All-Around
Gold medal – first place	2023 Baku	5 Hoops
Silver medal – second place	2022 Tel Aviv	5 Hoops
Silver medal – second place	2023 Baku	Group All-Around
Silver medal – second place	2023 Baku	3 Ribbons + 2 Balls
Silver medal – second place	2024 Budapest	3 Ribbons + 2 Balls
Bronze medal – third place	2022 Tel Aviv	Team
Bronze medal – third place	2023 Baku	Team
Bronze medal – third place	2024 Budapest	5 Hoops
Bronze medal – third place	2024 Budapest	Team
Junior World Championships
Bronze medal – third place	2019 Moscow	Team
Bronze medal – third place	2019 Moscow	5 Ribbons
Junior European Championships
Silver medal – second place	2019 Baku	5 Ribbons
European Cup
Gold medal – first place	2024 Baku	All-around
Gold medal – first place	2024 Baku	5 Hoops

Romi Paritzki (Hebrew: רומי פריצקי: born on 17 June 2004) is a retired Israeli world champion rhythmic gymnast, and captain of Israel's rhythmic gymnastics team. She won the gold medal in the group All-Around at the 2022 European Championship, a silver medal in the same category at the 2022 World Championships, and gold medals in Group and in Group Multiple Apparatus Ball, Ribbon, at the 2023 World Championships. Paritzki represented Israel at the 2024 Paris Olympics in the Women's rhythmic team all-around, in which Team Israel won the silver medal.

== Personal life ==
Paritzki was born in Israel, lives in Netanya, Israel, and is Jewish. She has two younger sisters, Eleanor and Nela who are also rhythmic gymnasts. The girls' parents are professional classical ballet dancers, who met in the Israeli ballet troupe.

She attended Rabin Elementary School in Netanya, and speaks Hebrew and English. After her sports career concludes, she hope to become a surgeon.

== Rhythmic gymnastics career ==
Paritzki took up gymnastics at age nine in Netanya, after being introduced to it through a school project and following her little sister. She has observed: "Starting in the field at the age of nine is very late. They usually start at the age of three or four."

At 14 years of age, as an eighth grader she was training between six and ten hours a day. Her club is Maccabi Tel Aviv, and her coaches are Alona Koshevatskiy and Ayelet Zussman.

=== Junior; Junior world championship bronze medals ===
At 12 years of age, Paritzki was called up to the Israeli national junior team. Paritzki was part of the national junior group for the 2019 Junior European Championships and World Championships. The group was composed of Paritzki, Amit Hedvat, Emili Malka, Mishel Mialitz, and Diana Svertsov. It won the European Championship silver medal with 5 ribbons, as well as World Championship team and 5 ribbons bronze medals.

=== Senior ===
==== 2022; European champion ====
In 2022 Paritzki was named part of Israel's new national group. They debuted at the World Cup in Athens, Greece, winning the gold medal in 5 hoops and 3 ribbons + 2 balls. Then Baku, where they got bronze in the All-Around and 5 hoops. Pamplona (All-Around silver), Portimão (All-Around gold) and Cluj-Napoca (All-Around and 5 hoops silver).

In June she participated in the 2022 European Championships in Tel Aviv, Israel, where the group won the All-Around and got silver with 5 hoops as well as the bronze medal in the senior team category along with teammates Shani Bakanov, Adar Friedmann, Amit Hedvat, Diana Svertsov, Ofir Shaham, and the individuals Daria Atamanov and Adi Asya Katz.

In September Paritzki took part in the 2022 World Championships in Sofia, Bulgaria, along with Adar Friedmann, Diana Svertsov, Ofir Shaham, and Shani Bakanov, winning two silver medals in the All-Around and the 5 hoops' final. Despite being among the favourites for a team medal, Israel couldn't take part in the competition because Atamanov broke her foot the day before the competition started and, as replacements had to be announced at least 24 hours before competition, leaving the country with only Katz as individual.

==== 2023; World champion ====
In 2023 at the first World Cup of the season in Athens the group won gold in the All-Around and with 5 hoops as well as silver with 3 ribbons + 2 balls. In Sofia they won silver in the All-Around and with 5 hoops.

At the 2023 World Championships in Valencia, Spain, Paritzki won two gold medals, on in Group and one in Group Multiple Apparatus Ball, Ribbon, as she was the team's captain. She said: “We are really happy that we managed to get this medal and that we got the chance to scream out the anthem from the podium. It’s the best feeling any athlete can have."

==== 2024–present; 2024 Paris Olympics silver medal ====
In March 2024 at the Rhythmic Gymnastics World Cup in Palaio Faliro, Greece, Paritzki and the group won the gold medal in the All-Around. She said: "We are so glad we got this gold medal. We worked really hard to achieve that, especially because of the situation in our country."

At the 2024 European Championships in May in Budapest, Hungary, she won a silver medal in Group Multiple Apparatus Ball, Ribbon, and bronze medals in Team, and in Group Single Apparatus Hoop.

Paritzki represented Israel at the 2024 Paris Olympics in the Women's rhythmic team all-around, in which Team Israel won the silver medal.

== See also ==
- List of medalists at the Rhythmic Gymnastics Junior European Championships
