= Diana Svertsov =

Israeli rhythmic gymnast

- דיאנה סברצוב
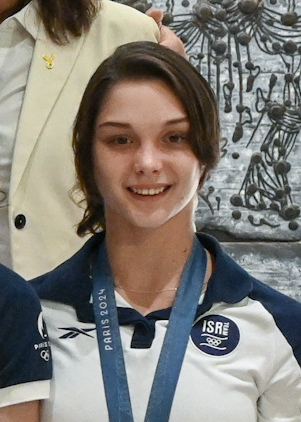
- Svertsov at the 2024 Summer Olympics
- Born: 15 November 2004 (age 21) Israel

Gymnastics career
- Discipline: Rhythmic gymnastics
- Country represented: Israel (2019-2024)
- Club: Maccabi Tel Aviv Rhythmic Gymnastics
- Head coach: Ayelet Zussman
- Retired: Yes
Medal record
Rhythmic Gymnastics
Representing Israel
Event	1st	2nd	3rd
Junior World Championships	0	0	2
Junior European Championships	0	1	0
FIG World Cup	6	6	2
European Championships	2	4	4
World Championships	2	2	0
Total	10	13	8
Olympic Games
Silver medal – second place	2024 Paris	Group all-around
World Championships
Gold medal – first place	2023 Valencia	Group All-Around
Gold medal – first place	2023 Valencia	3 Ribbons + 2 Balls
Silver medal – second place	2022 Sofia	Group All-Around
Silver medal – second place	2022 Sofia	5 Hoops
European Championships
Gold medal – first place	2022 Tel Aviv	Group All-Around
Gold medal – first place	2023 Baku	5 Hoops
Silver medal – second place	2022 Tel Aviv	5 Hoops
Silver medal – second place	2023 Baku	Group All-Around
Silver medal – second place	2023 Baku	3 Ribbons + 2 Balls
Silver medal – second place	2024 Budapest	3 Ribbons + 2 Balls
Bronze medal – third place	2022 Tel Aviv	Team
Bronze medal – third place	2023 Baku	Team
Bronze medal – third place	2024 Budapest	Team
Bronze medal – third place	2024 Budapest	5 Hoops
Junior World Championships
Bronze medal – third place	2019 Moscow	Team
Bronze medal – third place	2019 Moscow	5 Ribbons
Junior European Championships
Silver medal – second place	2019 Baku	5 Ribbons
European Cup
Gold medal – first place	2024 Baku	All-around
Gold medal – first place	2024 Baku	5 Hoops

Diana Svertsov (Hebrew: דיאנה סברצוב; born 15 November 2004) is a retired Israeli rhythmic gymnast. She won gold in the group All-Around at the 2022 European Championship and the silver medal in the same category at the 2022 World Championships. She represented Israel at the 2024 Paris Olympics in the Women's rhythmic team all-around, in which Team Israel won the silver medal.

== Rhythmic gymnastics career ==
=== Junior ===
Svertsov was part of the national junior group for the 2019 Junior European and World Championships. The group composed of Diana, Amit Hedvat, Emili Malka, Mishel Mialitz, Romi Paritzki won the European silver medal with 5 ribbons, as well as world's team and 5 ribbons bronze medal.

She is a resident of Bat Yam, Israel.

=== Senior ===
==== 2022 ====
In 2022 Diana was named part of Israel's new national group, they debuted at the World Cup in Athens, winning gold in 5 hoops and 3 ribbons + 2 balls. Then Baku, where they got bronze in the All-Around and 5 hoops. Pamplona (All-Around silver), Portimão (All-Around gold) and Cluj-Napoca (All-Around and 5 hoops silver).

In June she participated in the European Championships in Tel Aviv, where the group won the All-Around and got silver with 5 hoops as well as the bronze medal in the senior team category along with teammates Shani Bakanov, Adar Friedmann, Amit Hedvat, Romi Paritzki, Ofir Shaham, and the individuals Daria Atamanov and Adi Asya Katz.

In September Diana took part in the World Championships in Sofia along Adar Friedmann, Romi Paritzki, Ofir Shaham and Shani Bakanov, winning two silver medals in the All-Around and the 5 hoops' final. Despite being among the favourites for a team medal, Israel couldn't take part in the competition because Atamanov broke her foot the day before the competition started and, as replacements had to be announced at least 24 hours before competition, leaving the country with only Katz as individual.

==== 2023–present; 2024 Paris Olympics silver medal ====
In 2023 at the first World Cup of the season in Athens the group won gold in the All-Around and with 5 hoops as well as silver with 3 ribbons + 2 balls. In Sofia they won silver in the All-Around and with 5 hoops. In April she, with the group, won silver in the All-Around and gold in both event finals in Baku. At the European Championships she won bronze in teams along the rest of group and individuals Adi Asya Katz and Daniela Munits, silver in the All-Around and with 3 ribbons and 2 balls and gold with 5 hoops.

She represented Israel at the 2024 Paris Olympics in the Women's rhythmic team all-around, in which Team Israel won the silver medal.

In October 1, Svertsov was in the train to Jaffa during the 2024 Jaffa shooting, but she survived the shootings without any harm.
