= Eliza Banchuk =

Israeli rhythmic gymnast (born 2007)

- אלייזה בנצ'וק
- Born: 28 June 2007 (age 19) Israel

Gymnastics career
- Discipline: Rhythmic gymnastics
- Country represented: Israel (2021-)
- Head coach: Ayelet Zussman
Medal record
Rhythmic Gymnastics
Representing Israel
Event	1st	2nd	3rd
FIG World Cup	4	4	0
World Championships	2	0	0
European Championships	1	2	1
Junior European Championships	0	0	2
Total	6	6	3
World Championships
Gold medal – first place	2023 Valencia	Group All-Around
Gold medal – first place	2023 Valencia	3 Ribbons + 2 Balls
European Championships
Gold medal – first place	2023 Baku	5 Hoops
Silver medal – second place	2023 Baku	Group All-Around
Silver medal – second place	2023 Baku	3 Ribbons + 2 Balls
Bronze medal – third place	2023 Baku	Team
Junior European Championships
Bronze medal – third place	2021 Varna	All-Around
Bronze medal – third place	2021 Varna	5 Ribbons

Eliza Banchuk (Hebrew: אלייזה בנצ'וק; born 28 June 2007) is an Israeli rhythmic gymnast. She is part of the group that won the gold medal with 5 hoops at the 2023 Rhythmic Gymnastics European Championships, as well as the gold medal in Group All-Around at the 2023 Rhythmic Gymnastics World Championships. She will represent Israel at the 2024 Summer Olympics in Paris in the Women's rhythmic team all-around on 9-10 August 2024.

== Early and personal life ==
Banchuk was born in Israel, and is Jewish. She lives in Rishon Lezion, and speaks Hebrew and English.

== Rhythmic gymnastics career ==
Banchuk's club is Hapoel Rishon LeZion. Her coach is Ayelet Zussman, who is the Israeli national coach.

=== Junior; Junior European Championship bronze ===
In 2021 Banchuk was part of the junior group along with Shani Bakanov, Alona Hillel, Emili Malka, and Simona Rudnik, that won the bronze medal in the All-Around and with 5 ribbons at the European Junior Championships in Varna.

=== Senior; World Championship gold medals ===
In 2023 Banchuk was included in the senior group roster, debuting at the first World Cup of the season in Athens, Greece, where the group won the gold medal in the All-Around and with 5 hoops, as well as the silver medal with 3 ribbons + 2 balls. In Sofia, Bulgaria, they won silver in the All-Around and with 5 hoops. In April she, with the group, won silver in the All-Around and gold in both event finals in Baku. At the European Championships in May in Baku, Azerbaijan, she won gold with 5 hoops, silver in the All-Around and with 3 ribbons and 2 balls, and bronze in teams along the rest of group and individuals Adi Asya Katz and Daniela Munits.

At the 2023 Rhythmic Gymnastics World Championships in August in Valencia, Spain, Banchuk won gold medals in the group All-Around and with 3 ribbons and 2 balls. The Israeli team had prepared for the World Championship with ten-hour practice days, seven days a week.

Banchuk will represent Israel at the 2024 Summer Olympics in Paris in the Women's rhythmic team all-around on 9-10 August 2024.

== See also ==
- List of medalists at the Rhythmic Gymnastics Junior European Championships
- List of select Jewish gymnasts
