= 2024 Rhythmic Gymnastics European Championships =

- Venue: Papp László Sportaréna
- Location: Budapest, Hungary
- Start date: 22 May 2024
- End date: 26 May 2024

The 2024 Rhythmic Gymnastics European Championships is the 40th edition of the Rhythmic Gymnastics European Championships. The competition took place on 22-26 May 2024 at the Papp László Sportaréna in Budapest, Hungary. It was the final qualifying event for the 2024 Summer Olympics. The individual Olympic quota from the competition went to Vera Tugolukova and the group quota to Azerbaijan, although these results were disputed by the Polish Gymnastics Federation. In 2025, the President of the Superior Jury of judges at the competition was banned for four years and stripped of her judging qualifications due to score manipulation.

For 2024, the event also doubles as the Oceania Rhythmic Gymnastics Championships, with the gymnasts from Australia and New Zealand being ranked and qualifying for the Olympics separately from the European competitors. The individual Oceania berth went to Alexandra Kiroi-Bogatyreva from Australia, who had narrowly missed the 2021 Oceania Olympic spot amidst controversy with the competition procedures. The group Oceania berth went to Australia as well.

Fanni Pigniczki of Hungary became the first Hungarian rhythmic gymnast in the history of the European Championships to win a medal of any color in the individual event when she won a silver medal in the ball apparatus final. Liliana Lewińska won Poland's first European medal at the senior level with her silver medal in clubs, having previously won the first European medals for Poland at the 2022 Junior European Championships.

The SmartScoring Shooting Star Award was presented to California native Emily Beznos, representing Moldova. Beznos was accepted to the University of California at Los Angeles at age 14 in 2020. She graduated at age 16 with a Bachelor of Science degree in Cognitive Science, becoming one of the youngest graduates in the university’s history in 2022.

== Participating countries ==
- Albania
- Andorra
- Armenia
- Austria
- Azerbaijan
- Belgium
- Bulgaria
- Croatia
- Cyprus
- Czech Republic
- Spain
- Estonia
- Finland
- France
- Great Britain
- Georgia
- Germany
- Greece
- Hungary
- Israel
- Italy
- Latvia
- Lithuania
- Luxembourg
- Moldova
- North Macedonia
- Montenegro
- Netherlands
- Norway
- Poland
- Portugal
- Romania
- Slovenia
- San Marino
- Serbia
- Switzerland
- Slovakia
- Sweden
- Turkey
- Ukraine

Updated on May 7 2024.

== Competition schedule ==
- Wednesday May 22
  - 09:00 – 11:00 Set A – Junior individuals qualifications & Team ranking (Hoop, Ball, Clubs, Ribbon)
  - 11:15 – 13:15 Set B – Junior individuals qualifications & Team ranking (Hoop, Ball, Clubs, Ribbon)
  - 11:15 – 16:15 Set C – Junior individuals qualifications & Team ranking (Hoop, Ball, Clubs, Ribbon)
  - 16:30 – 18:30 Set D – Junior individuals qualifications & Team ranking (Hoop, Ball, Clubs, Ribbon)
  - 18:30 – 18:45 Award ceremony Junior individuals Team
- Thursday May 23
  - 09:00 – 11:00 Set A Senior Individuals qualifications (hoop & ball)
  - 11:15 – 13:15 Set B Senior Individuals qualifications (hoop & ball)
  - 14:15 – 16:15 Set C Senior Individuals qualifications (hoop & ball)
  - 16:30 – 18:30 Set D Senior Individuals qualifications (hoop & ball)
  - 19:55 - 20:55 Junior Individuals Apparatus Finals (Hoop & Ball)
  - 21:05 -22:05 Junior Individuals Apparatus Finals (Clubs & Ribbon)
- Friday May 24
  - 09:00 – 11:00 Set C Senior Individuals qualifications (clubs & ribbon)
  - 11:15 – 13:15 Set D Senior Individuals qualifications (clubs & ribbon)
  - 14:15 – 16:15 Set A Senior Individuals qualifications (clubs & ribbon)
  - 16:15 - 16:45 Opening Ceremony
  - 18:00 – 20:00 Set B Senior Individuals qualifications (clubs & ribbon)
- Saturday May 25
  - 10:00 – 13:10 Senior Individuals AA Final - SET B
  - 14:20 – 17:20 Senior Individuals AA Final - SET A
  - 17:20 – 17:30 Award Ceremony AA Seniors Individuals
  - 17:45 – 19:45 Senior Groups (5 hoops and 3 ribbons & 2 balls – SET A)
  - 20:00 – 22:00 Senior Groups (5 hoops and 3 ribbons & 2 balls – SET B)
  - 22:00 – 22:30 Award Ceremony AA Senior Groups & Team (Senior Individuals and Senior Groups)
- Sunday May 26
  - 10:10 – 11:10 Senior Individuals Hoop & Ball Finals
  - 11:20 – 12:20 Senior Individuals Clubs & Ribbon Finals
  - 12:25 – 12:35 Award Ceremony Senior Individual Apparatus finals
  - 12:35 - 12:40 Gymnast of the Year Award
  - 13:45 – 14:25 Senior Groups 5 Hoops Final
  - 14:35 – 15:15 Senior Groups 3 ribbons & 2 balls Final
  - 15:15 - 15:25 SmartScoring Shooting Star Award
  - 15:25 – 15:40 Award Ceremony Senior Groups Apparatus finals
  - 16:00 - 16:45 Closing Ceremony & Gala

== Controversies ==
At the end of the individual qualifying round, Vera Tugolukova, representing Cyprus, was in position to earn the European Olympic quota, narrowly ahead of Liliana Lewińska from Poland. However, before the allocation of the spot was officially confirmed, the Polish Gymnastics Federation alleged that the judging was corrupt and that Lewińska's scores were lowered, preventing her from winning the Olympic berth. The Polish Gymnastics Federation's president announced their intention to protest the results, and they filed appeals to the International Gymnastics Federation and the Gymnastics Ethics Foundation. He later said that some of the judges at the competition had filed complaints as well. There were also allegations that the Polish group's scores had been similarly lowered.

A week after the competition ended, the allocation of the Olympic spots from the Oceania Championships, which was run at the European Championships, as well as the tripartite spot, had been released, but not the allocation of the quotas given at the European Championships. The official quota allocation was released on June 4 and allocated the spots in line with the event results to Tugolukova and the Azerbaijan group. The Polish Gymnastics Federation stated that they were preparing a further appeal to the Court of Arbitration for Sport.

Gymnastics Ethics Foundation Disciplinary Commission released its decision on 6 February 2025. Evangelia Trikomiti, the President of the Superior Jury at the 2024 Rhythmic Gymnastics European Championships, was found guilty of breaking the International Gymnastics Federation (FIG) code of ethics, code of conduct, the general judges’ rules and the judge’s oath by manipulating the scores at the Championships. She was declared ineligible to participate in all gymnastics-related activities for a period of four years, excluding coaching, and her FIG Judge Brevet was annulled. The FIG rejudged the routines of both gymnasts and found that Lewińska should have been placed higher and thus should have earned the Olympic quota. However, the proceeding was not about a “field of play” decision, so the results were not changed.

The case was appealed at the Court of Arbitration for Sport (CAS). In January 2026, CAS upheld the disciplinary decisions of the Gymnastics Ethics Foundation and dismissed the appeal.

== Medal winners ==
Event	Gold	Silver	Bronze
Team
Junior Team	Romania; Amalia Lică; Lisa Garac	Israel; Alona Tal Franco; Meital Maayam Sumkin	Azerbaijan; Ilaha Bahadirova; Shams Aghahuseynova; Fidan Gurbanli; Govhar Ibrahimova
Senior Team	Bulgaria; Senior Individual; Boryana Kaleyn; Elvira Krasnobaeva; Stiliana Nikolova; Senior Group; Sofia Ivanova; Magdalina Minevska; Kamelia Petrova; Rachel Stoyanov; Margarita Vasileva	Italy; Senior Individual; Milena Baldassarri; Tara Dragas; Sofia Raffaeli; Senior Group; Martina Centofanti; Agnese Duranti; Alessia Maurelli; Daniela Mogurean; Laura Paris; Alessia Russo	Israel; Senior Individual; Daria Atamanov; Daniela Munits; Senior Group; Shani Bakanov; Adar Friedmann; Romi Paritzki; Ofir Shaham; Diana Svertsov
Senior Individual Finals
All-Around	Stiliana Nikolova; Bulgaria	Sofia Raffaeli; Italy	Darja Varfolomeev; Germany
Hoop	Boryana Kaleyn; Bulgaria	Stiliana Nikolova; Bulgaria	Taisiia Onofriichuk; Ukraine
Ball	Sofia Raffaeli; Italy	Fanni Pigniczki; Hungary	Daniela Munits; Israel
Clubs	Daniela Munits; Israel	Liliana Lewinska; Poland	Boryana Kaleyn; Bulgaria
Ribbon	Darja Varfolomeev; Germany	Sofia Raffaeli; Italy	Elvira Krasnobaeva; Bulgaria
Senior Group Finals
All-Around	Bulgaria; Sofia Ivanova; Magdalina Minevska; Kamelia Petrova; Rachel Stoyanov; Margarita Vasileva	Italy; Martina Centofanti; Agnese Duranti; Alessia Maurelli; Daniela Mogurean; Laura Paris; Alessia Russo	Spain; Ana Arnau; Inés Bergua; Mireia Martínez; Patricia Pérez; Salma Solaun
5 Hoops	Italy; Martina Centofanti; Agnese Duranti; Alessia Maurelli; Daniela Mogurean; Laura Paris; Alessia Russo*	Spain; Ana Arnau; Inés Bergua; Mireia Martínez; Patricia Pérez; Salma Solaun	Israel; Shani Bakanov; Adar Friedmann; Romi Paritzki; Ofir Shaham; Diana Svertsov
3 Ribbons + 2 Balls	Spain; Ana Arnau; Inés Bergua; Mireia Martínez; Patricia Pérez; Salma Solaun	Israel; Shani Bakanov; Adar Friedmann; Romi Paritzki; Ofir Shaham; Diana Svertsov	Ukraine; Diana Baieva; Alina Melnyk; Valeriia Peremeta; Kira Shyrykina; Mariia Vysochanska
Junior Individual Finals
Hoop	Amalia Lică; Romania	Alona Tal Franco; Israel	Olivia Maslov; Poland
Ball	Meital Maayam Sumkin; Israel	Anna Piergentili; Italy	Magdalena Valkova; Bulgaria
Clubs	Amalia Lică; Romania	Alja Ponikvar; Slovenia	Alona Tal Franco; Israel
Ribbon	Amalia Lică; Romania	Dara Malinova; Bulgaria	Barbare Kajaia; Georgia

* reserve gymnast

=== Oceanian Championships ===
Event	Gold	Silver	Bronze
Oceania
Oceania	(Australia) Alexandra Kiroi-Bogatyreva	(Australia) Miyabi Akiya	(New Zealand) Havana Hopman

== Results ==
=== Team ===
==== Junior ====
Rank	Nation	Hoop (rhythmic gymnastics)	Ball (rhythmic gymnastics)	Clubs (rhythmic gymnastics)	Ribbon (rhythmic gymnastics)	Total
1st place, gold medalist(s)	Romania	32.650	29.750	31.000	31.700	125.100
2nd place, silver medalist(s)	Israel	29.950	30.250	31.500	32.050	123.750
3rd place, bronze medalist(s)	Azerbaijan	30.050	29.850	28.500	29.000	117.400
4	Bulgaria	31.650	29.000	26.800	29.850	117.300
5	Italy	28.050	30.150	28.350	27.200	113.750
6	Estonia	28.800	28.350	28.650	27.550	113.350
7	Hungary	30.200	28.500	27.550	26.950	113.200
8	Slovenia	29.650	29.200	28.800	25.400	113.050
9	Poland	30.650	25.900	27.650	27.600	111.800
10	Turkey	28.350	28.400	27.450	26.250	110.450
11	Ukraine	30.050	27.550	28.600	23.950	110.150
12	Germany	28.000	27.350	28.350	25.600	109.300
13	Cyprus	28.550	27.300	26.800	26.600	109.250
14	France	26.550	28.300	26.500	26.500	107.850
15	Spain	29.700	27.450	26.050	23.450	106.650
16	Lithuania	27.050	26.100	25.250	27.550	105.950
17	Finland	26.500	26.350	28.000	25.100	105.950
18	Moldova	27.450	28.150	24.600	25.600	105.800
19	Georgia	27.550	22.050	26.700	28.600	104.900
20	Latvia	30.100	22.750	29.250	21.150	103.250
21	Belgium	26.550	26.350	26.050	24.250	103.200
22	Greece	25.600	23.900	26.800	25.350	101.650
23	Slovakia	27.050	24.650	24.650	25.050	101.400
24	Czech Republic	25.250	25.550	25.300	25.050	101.150
25	Switzerland	25.450	24.100	26.500	24.150	100.200
26	Portugal	26.500	22.950	24.950	24.050	98.450
27	San Marino	26.150	23.300	22.450	23.200	95.100
28	Luxembourg	24.100	25.700	23.050	22.200	95.050
29	Croatia	25.450	23.700	22.950	22.850	94.950
30	Serbia	22.700	26.250	24.250	21.750	94.950
31	Norway	26.500	23.900	23.950	20.300	94.650
32	Austria	23.950	24.150	24.000	22.150	94.250
33	Montenegro	21.750	22.500	23.550	22.500	90.650
34	Netherlands	21.750	22.500	20.050	22.950	89.300
35	Armenia	19.450	25.000	20.050	22.950	87.450
36	Andorra	23.000	20.700	21.100	17.100	81.900

==== Senior ====
Rank	Nation	Hoop (rhythmic gymnastics)	Ball (rhythmic gymnastics)	Clubs (rhythmic gymnastics)	Ribbon (rhythmic gymnastics)	5	3, 2	Total
1st place, gold medalist(s)	Bulgaria	72.500	63.550	67.800	65.300	39.150	34.850	343.150
2nd place, silver medalist(s)	Italy	68.400	67.750	66.450	64.750	38.900	32.300	338.550
3rd place, bronze medalist(s)	Israel	70.650	66.200	63.500	64.100	38.150	31.900	334.500
4	Germany	66.900	67.950	66.250	64.400	35.800	32.200	333.500
5	Spain	67.200	64.600	61.100	62.950	36.750	34.450	327.050
6	Hungary	65.650	65.400	63.100	63.100	33.250	31.200	321.700
7	Poland	65.350	62.550	62.200	62.200	35.300	32.600	320.200
8	Ukraine	67.750	62.000	58.600	62.300	35.750	33.500	319.900
9	Azerbaijan	62.750	63.400	61.400	54.000	37.050	33.150	311.750
10	France	60.900	58.450	60.200	59.100	36.450	27.550	302.650
11	Turkey	61.150	61.550	60.250	53.300	33.100	28.550	297.900
12	Greece	59.850	55.650	56.850	51.450	34.600	29.800	288.200
13	Romania	61.050	59.800	61.800	54.950	24.400	25.800	287.800
14	Finland	60.850	61.200	60.650	52.350	26.600	20.050	281.700
15	Georgia	60.850	56.450	53.750	56.500	29.400	23.000	279.950
16	Portugal	55.450	54.650	58.250	52.000	27.050	26.200	273.600
17	Norway	58.600	57.400	56.600	54.350	23.250	20.450	270.650
18	Great Britain	59.150	55.300	55.000	55.600	23.900	18.300	267.250
19	Serbia	55.000	54.550	53.100	51.450	25.900	18.750	258.750

=== Junior Individual ===
==== Hoop ====
Rank	Gymnast	Nation	D Score	E Score	A Score	Pen	Total
1st place, gold medalist(s)	Amalia Lică	Romania	16.300	8.200	8.350		32.850
2nd place, silver medalist(s)	Alona Tal Franco	Israel	16.300	8.200	8.250		32.750
3rd place, bronze medalist(s)	Olivia Maslov	Poland	16.100	8.000	8.150		32.250
4	Dara Malinova	Bulgaria	15.100	8.200	8.000		31.300
5	Govhar Ibrahimova	Azerbaijan	14.400	8.150	7.850		30.400
6	Taisiia Redka	Ukraine	14.700	7.900	7.600		30.200
7	Alise Lebedeva	Latvia	14.200	7.900	7.900		30.000
8	Elena Vukmir	Hungary	12.900	7.500	7.500		27.900

==== Ball ====
Rank	Gymnast	Nation	D Score	E Score	A Score	Pen	Total
1st place, gold medalist(s)	Meital Maayam Sumkin	Israel	16.700	8.300	8.550		33.550
2nd place, silver medalist(s)	Anna Piergentili	Italy	14.700	8.250	8.300		31.250
3rd place, bronze medalist(s)	Magdalena Valkova	Bulgaria	14.900	8.200	8.100	0.05	31.150
4	Ilaha Bahadirova	Azerbaijan	14.200	8.100	8.200		30.500
5	Lisa Garac	Romania	14.300	7.900	8.000		30.200
6	Elena Vukmir	Hungary	13.900	8.000	8.000		29.900
7	Alja Ponikvar	Slovenia	14.200	7.900	7.750		29,850
8	Eysan Ates	Turkey	13.000	7.800	7.800	0.05	28.550

==== Clubs ====
Rank	Gymnast	Nation	D Score	E Score	A Score	Pen	Total
1st place, gold medalist(s)	Amalia Lică	Romania	14.400	8.150	8.250		30.800
2nd place, silver medalist(s)	Alja Ponikvar	Slovenia	14.600	7.950	8.000		30.550
3rd place, bronze medalist(s)	Alona Tal Franco	Israel	14.400	7.700	8.350		30.450
4	Margherita Fucci	Italy	13.900	8.250	8.100		30.250
5	Alise Lebedeva	Latvia	14.400	7.900	7.650		29.950
6	Kseniia Solomon	Ukraine	12.900	7.900	8.050		28.850
7	Sofia Jakovleva	Estonia	13.500	7.450	7.850		28.800
8	Fidan Gurbanli	Azerbaijan	12.800	7.800	7.800		28.400

==== Ribbon ====
Rank	Gymnast	Nation	D Score	E Score	A Score	Pen	Total
1st place, gold medalist(s)	Amalia Lică	Romania	14.500	8.200	8.250		30.950
2nd place, silver medalist(s)	Dara Malinova	Bulgaria	13.300	8.200	8.100		29.600
3rd place, bronze medalist(s)	Barbare Kajaia	Georgia	13.400	7.900	8.350		29.000
4	Shams Aghahuseynova	Azerbaijan	13.100	7.400	7.800		28.300
5	Elys Kretelle Kukk	Estonia	12.700	7.500	7.650		29.850
6	Nijole Mickute	Lithuania	12.400	7.700	7.700		27.800
7	Kseniya Zhyzhych	Poland	11.100	7.750	7.700		26.550
8	Meital Maayam Sumkin	Israel	11.200	6.400	7.650		25.250

=== Senior Individual ===
==== All-Around ====
Rank	Gymnast	Nation	Hoop (rhythmic gymnastics)	Ball (rhythmic gymnastics)	Clubs (rhythmic gymnastics)	Ribbon (rhythmic gymnastics)	Total
1st place, gold medalist(s)	Stiliana Nikolova	Bulgaria	35.700 (3)	37.200 (1)	36.050 (1)	34.800 (1)	143.750
2nd place, silver medalist(s)	Sofia Raffaeli	Italy	36.300 (1)	35.500 (3)	34.000 (4)	33.950 (2)	139.750
3rd place, bronze medalist(s)	Darja Varfolomeev	Germany	35.500 (4)	36.600 (2)	35.100 (2)	31.250	138.450
4	Boryana Kaleyn	Bulgaria	34.150 (9)	33.300 (10)	34.300 (3)	33.800 (3)	135.550
5	Daniela Munits	Israel	34.600 (6)	33.900 (6)	33.300 (6)	32.500 (6)	134.300
6	Milena Baldassarri	Italy	34.750 (5)	33.300 (10)	33.150 (8)	32.800 (5)	134.000
7	Margarita Kolosov	Germany	33.500	34.200 (5)	33.300 (6)	32.400 (8)	133.400
8	Fanni Pigniczki	Hungary	32.850	34.700 (4)	31.950	32.500 (7)	132.000
9	Taisiia Onofriichuk	Ukraine	31.150	33.700 (7)	33.700 (5)	33.000 (4)	131.550
10	Liliana Lewinska	Poland	34.350 (8)	31.850	32.600 (9)	32.000 (10)	130.800
11	Ekaterina Vedeneeva	Slovenia	33.450	33.650 (8)	31.800	31.100	130.000
12	Hanna Panna Wiesner	Hungary	33.700 (10)	32.150	32.350	30.850	129.050
13	Polina Berezina	Spain	34.400 (7)	33.100	30.350	31.100	128.950
14	Alba Bautista	Spain	32.500	33.450 (9)	30.900	32.050 (9)	128.900
15	Hélène Karbanov	France	33.400	33.450 (9)	30.850	31.050	128.750
16	Vera Tugolukova	Cyprus	31.700	32.900	32.400 (10)	31.550	128.550
17	Zohra Aghamirova	Azerbaijan	32.500	32.750	31.600	30.600	127.450
18	Emilia Heichel	Poland	33.650	30.650	31.400	30.750	126.450
19	Daria Atamanov	Israel	35.750 (2)	29.700	29.600	30.650	125.700
20	Hatice Gokce Emir	Turkey	28.100	32.350	31.400	29.450	121.300
21	Annaliese Dragan	Romania	30.550	28.900	32.400 (10)	29.200	121.050
22	Anastasia Rogozhina	Finland	30.800	30.400	30.800	28.900	120.900
23	Anette Vaher	Estonia	29.350	29.550	30.350	30.500	119.750
24	Maria Avgousti	Cyprus	29.850	28.300	28.050	26.750	112.950

==== Hoop ====
Rank	Gymnast	Nation	D Score	E Score	A Score	Pen.	Total
1st place, gold medalist(s)	Boryana Kaleyn	Bulgaria	18.5	8.300	8.500	0.050	35.250
2nd place, silver medalist(s)	Stiliana Nikolova	Bulgaria	18.1	8.400	8.450		34.950
3rd place, bronze medalist(s)	Taisiia Onofriichuk	Ukraine	19.1	7.700	8.100		34.900
4	Alba Bautista	Spain	18.1	8.250	8.250		34.600
5	Ekaterina Vedeneeva	Slovenia	16.8	8.150	8.250		33.200
6	Daniela Munits	Israel	16.3	8.150	8.100		32.550
7	Daria Atamanov	Israel	16.1	7.200	8.050		31.350
8	Sofia Raffaeli	Italy	16.7	6.550	7.800	0.600	30.450

==== Ball ====
Rank	Gymnast	Nation	D Score	E Score	A Score	Pen.	Total
1st place, gold medalist(s)	Sofia Raffaeli	Italy	18.4	8.450	8.500		35.350
2nd place, silver medalist(s)	Fanni Pigniczki	Hungary	18.4	8.150	8.300		34.850
3rd place, bronze medalist(s)	Daniela Munits	Israel	17.6	8.400	8.250		34.250
4	Darja Varfolomeev	Germany	17.8	7.850	8.350		34.000
5	Stiliana Nikolova	Bulgaria	16.9	8.200	8.450		33.550
6	Alba Bautista	Spain	16.7	7.850	8.200		32.750
7	Vera Tugolukova	Cyprus	16.6	7.200	8.000		31.800
8	Taisiia Onofriichuk	Ukraine	15.2	7.300	8.100		30.600

==== Clubs ====
Rank	Gymnast	Nation	D Score	E Score	A Score	Pen.	Total
1st place, gold medalist(s)	Daniela Munits	Israel	17.1	8.150	8.150		33.400
2nd place, silver medalist(s)	Liliana Lewinska	Poland	16.2	8.200	8.550		32.950
3rd place, bronze medalist(s)	Boryana Kaleyn	Bulgaria	16.6	8.000	8.300		32.900
4	Vera Tugolukova	Cyprus	16.7	7.650	7.950		32.300
5	Milena Baldassarri	Italy	16.2	7.800	8.200		32.200
6	Sofia Raffaeli	Italy	16.0	7.500	8.250		31.750
7	Elvira Krasnobaeva	Bulgaria	16.0	7.350	7.850	0.300	30.900
8	Margarita Kolosov	Germany	15.5	7.150	7.900		30.550

==== Ribbon ====
Rank	Gymnast	Nation	D Score	E Score	A Score	Pen.	Total
1st place, gold medalist(s)	Darja Varfolomeev	Germany	17.3	8.600	8.500		34.400
2nd place, silver medalist(s)	Sofia Raffaeli	Italy	17.1	8.350	8.500		33.950
3rd place, bronze medalist(s)	Elvira Krasnobaeva	Bulgaria	16.8	8.350	8.550		33.700
4	Stiliana Nikolova	Bulgaria	16.6	8.400	8.500		33.500
5	Fanni Pigniczki	Hungary	16.8	8.050	8.300		33.150
6	Taisiia Onofriichuk	Ukraine	16.5	8.200	8.350		33.050
7	Alba Bautista	Spain	15.2	7.450	8.000		30.650
8	Daria Atamanov	Israel	14.1	7.600	8.200		29.900

=== Groups ===
==== Group All-Around ====
Rank	Nation	5	3, 2	Total
1st place, gold medalist(s)	Bulgaria	39.150	34.850	74.000
2nd place, silver medalist(s)	Italy	38.900	32.300	71.200
3rd place, bronze medalist(s)	Spain	36.750	34.450	71.200
4	Azerbaijan	37.050	33.150	70.200
5	Israel	38.150	31.900	70.050
6	Ukraine	35.750	33.500	69.250
7	Germany	35.800	32.200	68.000
8	Poland	35.300	32.600	67.900
9	Hungary	33.250	31.200	64.450
10	Greece	34.600	29.800	64.400
11	France	36.450	27.550	64.000
12	Turkey	33.100	28.550	61.650
13	Portugal	27.050	26.200	53.250
14	Georgia	29.400	23.000	52.400
15	Romania	24.400	25.800	50.200
16	Finland	26.600	20.050	46.650
17	Serbia	25.900	18.750	44.650
18	Norway	23.250	20.450	43.700
19	Great Britain	23.900	18.300	42.200

==== 5 Hoops ====
Rank	Nation	D Score	E Score	A Score	Pen.	Total
1st place, gold medalist(s)	Italy	22.5	8.200	8.650		39.350
2nd place, silver medalist(s)	Spain	22.3	8.000	8.450		38.750
3rd place, bronze medalist(s)	Israel	21.8	8.350	8.500		38.650
4	Bulgaria	21.3	8.050	8.600		37.950
5	Ukraine	21.5	8.100	8.250		37.850
6	Azerbaijan	20.4	7.900	8.300		36.600
7	Germany	20.5	7.650	7.950	0.350	35.750
8	France	20.2	6.700	7.950		34.850

==== 3 Ribbons + 2 Balls ====
Rank	Nation	D Score	E Score	A Score	Pen.	Total
1st place, gold medalist(s)	Spain	18.8	7.650	8.250		34.700
2nd place, silver medalist(s)	Israel	18.7	7.500	8.350	0.050	34.500
3rd place, bronze medalist(s)	Ukraine	18.4	7.200	8.300		33.900
4	Azerbaijan	17.4	7.650	8.300		33.350
5	Poland	17.4	7.050	8.000	0.300	32.150
6	Germany	17.3	6.900	7.950		32.150
7	Italy	16.9	7.150	8.050		32.100
8	Bulgaria	16.1	5.500	7.600	0.600	28.600

== Medal count ==
* Host nation (Hungary)

Rank	Nation	Gold	Silver	Bronze	Total
1	Bulgaria	4	2	3	9
2	Romania	4	0	0	4
3	Italy	2	5	0	7
4	Israel	2	3	4	9
5	Spain	1	1	1	3
6	Germany	1	0	1	2
7	Poland	0	1	1	2
8	Hungary*	0	1	0	1
8	Slovenia	0	1	0	1
10	Ukraine	0	0	2	2
11	Azerbaijan	0	0	1	1
11	Georgia	0	0	1	1
Totals (12 entries)		14	14	14	42
