= Alise Lebedeva =

Latvian rhythmic gymnast

- Born: 18 September 2009 (age 16) Latvia

Gymnastics career
- Discipline: Rhythmic gymnastics
- Country represented: Latvia (2022–present)
- Club: Latvijas Mākslas Vingrošanas Klubs - WEST
- Head coach: Natalia Kučinska
- Assistant coach: Anna Sidenko

Alise Lebedeva (born 18 September 2009) is a Latvian individual rhythmic gymnast. On the national level, she is the 2025 Latvian all-around champion and a two-time (2023, 2024) Latvian junior all-around champion.

== Career ==
=== Junior ===
In 2022, she started competing as a junior. Her first competition was Miss Valentine tournament in Tartu, Estonia. She took 20th place in 2009 category. She took 5th place in all-around at Latvian National championships that year.

In 2023, she make it to the national team. In March, she competed at Sofia Cup in Bulgaria, where she took 28th place in all-around. In May, she competed at the 30th Portimão International Tournament in Portugal. She was 6th in hoop and clubs qualifications. She represented Latvia together with Margarita Ardaseva, Alisa Silkova and Milena Smelova at the 2023 Junior World Championships in Cluj-Napoca, Romania. She took 17th place with clubs. She won gold medal at Latvian National championships that year.

In 2024, she competed at the 2024 European Cup in Baku, Azerbaijan, taking 6th place in clubs final. She represented Latvia at the 2024 Junior European Championships in Budapest, Hungary. She placed 5th in clubs and 7th in hoop finals. In November, she won gold medal in the all-around at the Latvian National championships in junior category.

=== Senior ===
Alise started competing as a senior in 2025. In February in front of home crowd at Miss Valentine. She took 7th place in all-around and qualified to three apparatus finals - finishing 7th in ball,5th in clubs and 8th in ribbon final. In March, she won bronze medal in all-around and clubs at Sofia Cup. She was 4th with hoop and ball, and 5th with ribbon. In April, she made her World Cup debut at Baku World Cup and finished on 37th place in all-around.

In June, she was selected to represent Estonia at the 2025 European Championships in Tallinn, Estonia. She took 29th place in all-around qualifications and did not qualify to all-around final. Her best result was with ribbon (12th place). Next month, she competed at Milan World Cup, taking 36th place in all-around. In August, she was selected to represent Latvia at the 2025 World Championships in Rio de Janeiro, Brazil. She took 35th place in all-around qualifications. In November, she won her third consecutive all-around title at Latvian Championships.

== Routine music information ==
Year	Apparatus	Music title
2025	Hoop	You Can't Hide by Ck9c, Elizabeth Ann
2025	Ball	UH OH! (feat. BENEE) by Sub Urban
2025	Clubs	
2025	Ribbon	The Ghost by NIVIRO
2024	Hoop	You Can't Hide by Ck9c, Elizabeth Ann
2024	Ball	
2024	Clubs	Butter by BTS
2024	Ribbon	
