= Olivia Maslov =

Polish rhythmic gymnast

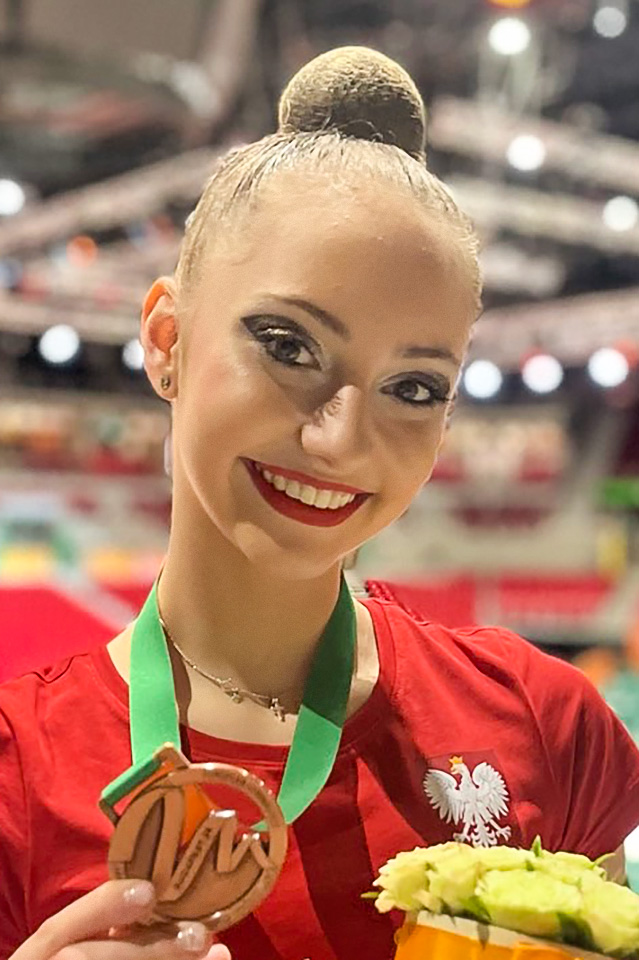
- Olivia Maslov (2024)

Personal information
- Born: 14 June 2009 (age 17) Kyiv, Ukraine

Gymnastics career
- Discipline: Rhythmic gymnastics
- Country represented: Poland (2020–present)
- Club: UKS Irina Warszawa
- Head coach: Irina Lortkipanidze
Medal record
Representing Poland
Rhythmic Gymnastics
Junior European Championships
Bronze medal – third place	2024 Budapest	Hoop

Olivia Maslov (born 14 June 2009) is a Polish rhythmic gymnast. She is the 2024 European hoop bronze medalist.

== Career ==
=== Junior ===
On national level, she is the 2023 Polish Junior All-around silver medalist. She also won silver medals in Hoop and Ball final and bronze in Clubs.

In 2024, Olivia won Polish Junior all-around title. She also won gold in hoop, silver in clubs and bronze medal in ball. Later, she was selected to represent Poland at the 2024 European Championships in Budapest, Hungary, together with Zlata Usanova and Kseniya Zhyzhych. They took 9th place in Team competition. She was doing two apparatus - clubs and hoop, with which she qualified to the final. She won bronze medal in Hoop Final.

=== Senior ===
She started her 2025 season in February, at Gracia Cup in Budapest, where she won silver medal in all-around. She took 5th place in all-around at Polish National Championships in March. On April 18-20, she made her World Cup debut in Baku, where she took 23rd place in all-around. In May, she competed at International tournament Pharaoh's Cup in Egypt, taking silver medals in hoop, ball and clubs and bronze medal in ribbon final.

In 2026, she took 4th place in all-around at Polish National Championships in March. On April 17-19, she competed at Baku World Cup and took 28th place in all-around. In May, she won bronze medal in all-around at International tournament in Portimão.

== Routine music information ==
Year	Apparatus	Music title
2026	Hoop	
2026	Ball	Cell Block Tango (from Chicago) by Catherine Zeta-Jones, Susan Misner, Deidre Goodwin, Denise Faye, Ekaterina Chtchelkanova, Mýa Harrison, Taye Diggs
2026	Clubs	
2026	Ribbon	Seven Nation Army (cover) by Scott Bradlee's Postmodern Jukebox
2025	Hoop	
2025	Ball	
2025	Clubs	Don't Lose Ur Head by SIX, Christina Modestou
2025	Ribbon	Marriage is a Dungeon (Max and Bracia's Duet) by Ginny & Georgia cast
2024	Hoop	Boundless Drama by Brand X Music
2024	Ball	
2024	Clubs	Illusion by Manolo Carrasco, Daniel Saltares, Eduardo Jose Baldomero
2024	Ribbon	Marriage is a Dungeon (Max and Bracia's Duet) by Ginny & Georgia cast
