= Gymnastics at the 2024 Summer Olympics =

Gymnastics at the Games of the XXXIII Olympiad
- Pictograms for artistic gymnastics (left), rhythmic gymnastics (center), and trampoline gymnastics (right)
- Venue: Bercy Arena; Porte de La Chapelle Arena
- Dates: 27 July – 10 August 2024
- No. of events: 18 (9 men, 9 women)
- Competitors: 318 (110 men and 206 women)

Gymnastics competitions at the 2024 Summer Olympics in Paris were contested in three categories: artistic gymnastics, rhythmic gymnastics and trampolining. The artistic (27 July to 5 August) and trampoline (2 August) events took place at the Accor Arena (referred to as the Bercy Arena due to IOC sponsorship rules), with the rhythmic events staged at Porte de La Chapelle Arena from 8 to 10 August.

== Qualification ==
The qualification pathway for the 2024 Summer Olympics was significantly simplified and modified from those in 2020. In the artistic team event, a maximum of five gymnasts were eligible to participate as opposed to the four per team and two individuals who competed in Tokyo 2020. Three teams who finished on the podium qualified for the Olympics through the 2022 World Artistic Gymnastics Championships in Liverpool with a large proportion of quota places distributed at the same meet in Antwerp, Belgium by the following year. The 2024 World Cup series also gave the gymnasts an opportunity to earn more spots in separate apparatus events.

In rhythmic gymnastics, the 2022 World Championships, held from 14 to 18 September in Sofia, Bulgaria, witnessed individual and group all-around medalists book their tickets in Paris. Most quota places were allocated at the same meet in Valencia, Spain by the following year with fourteen individual gymnasts and five nations across all continents vying for qualification.

Half of the trampoline qualifying slots were awarded to the highest-ranked gymnasts at the 2023 World Championships in Birmingham with the majority coming from the 2023–2024 World Cup series. Across all gymnastics disciplines, the remaining places were offered to the gymnasts vying for qualification at their respective continental meets.

== Participating nations ==
There are 54 participating nations:

- Algeria (1)
- Armenia (2)
- Australia (13)
- Austria (2)
- Azerbaijan (7)
- Belgium (5)
- Brazil (15)
- Bulgaria (9)
- Canada (11)
- China (20)
- Colombia (3)
- Croatia (2)
- Cyprus (2)
- Czech Republic (1)
- Dominican Republic (1)
- Egypt (10)
- France (14) (host)
- Georgia (1)
- Germany (16)
- Great Britain (13)
- Greece (1)
- Haiti (1)
- Hungary (5)
- Hong Kong (1)
- Indonesia (1)
- Individual Neutral Athletes (3)
- Iran (1)
- Ireland (1)
- Israel (8)
- Italy (17)
- Japan (12)
- Jordan (1)
- Kazakhstan (4)
- Laos (1)
- Lithuania (1)
- Mexico (8)
- Netherlands (10)
- New Zealand (3)
- North Korea (1)
- Panama (1)
- Philippines (4)
- Portugal (2)
- Romania (7)
- Slovenia (2)
- South Africa (1)
- South Korea (8)
- Spain (17)
- Switzerland (6)
- Syria (1)
- Chinese Taipei (2)
- Turkey (5)
- Ukraine (12)
- United States (13)
- Uzbekistan (3)

== Competition schedule ==
Legend
| Q | Qualification | F | Final |

Schedule
| Event ↓ / Date → | Sat 27 | Sun 28 | Mon 29 | Tue 30 | Wed 31 | Thu 1 | Fri 2 | | Sat 3 | Sun 4 | Mon 5 | Thu 8 | Fri 9 | Sat 10 |
|---|---|---|---|---|---|---|---|---|---|---|---|---|---|---|
Artistic
| Men's team all-around | Q | | F | | | | | | | | | | | |
| Men's individual all-around | Q | | | | F | | | | | | | | | |
| Men's floor | Q | | | | | | | | F | | | | | |
| Men's pommel horse | Q | | | | | | | | F | | | | | |
| Men's rings | Q | | | | | | | | | F | | | | |
| Men's vault | Q | | | | | | | | | F | | | | |
| Men's parallel bars | Q | | | | | | | | | | F | | | |
| Men's horizontal bar | Q | | | | | | | | | | F | | | |
| Women's team all-around | | Q | | F | | | | | | | | | | |
| Women's individual all-around | | Q | | | | F | | | | | | | | |
| Women's vault | | Q | | | | | | | F | | | | | |
| Women's uneven bars | | Q | | | | | | | | F | | | | |
| Women's balance beam | | Q | | | | | | | | | F | | | |
| Women's floor | | Q | | | | | | | | | F | | | |
Rhythmic
| Women's group all-around | | | | | | | | | | | | | Q | F |
| Women's individual all-around | | | | | | | | | | | | Q | F | |
Trampoline
| Men's trampoline | | | | | | | Q | F | | | | | | |
| Women's trampoline | | | | | | | Q | F | | | | | | |

== Medal summary ==
=== Medal table ===
* Host nation (France)

| Rank | NOC | Gold | Silver | Bronze | Total |
|---|---|---|---|---|---|
| 1 | China | 3 | 6 | 3 | 12 |
| 2 | United States | 3 | 1 | 5 | 9 |
| 3 | Japan | 3 | 0 | 1 | 4 |
| 4 | Philippines | 2 | 0 | 0 | 2 |
| 5 | Brazil | 1 | 2 | 1 | 4 |
| 6 | Italy | 1 | 1 | 3 | 5 |
| – | Individual Neutral Athletes | 1 | 1 | 0 | 2 |
| 7 | Great Britain | 1 | 0 | 2 | 3 |
| 8 | Algeria | 1 | 0 | 0 | 1 |
| 8 | Germany | 1 | 0 | 0 | 1 |
| 8 | Ireland | 1 | 0 | 0 | 1 |
| 11 | Israel | 0 | 2 | 0 | 2 |
| 12 | Armenia | 0 | 1 | 0 | 1 |
| 12 | Bulgaria | 0 | 1 | 0 | 1 |
| 12 | Colombia | 0 | 1 | 0 | 1 |
| 12 | Kazakhstan | 0 | 1 | 0 | 1 |
| 12 | Ukraine | 0 | 1 | 0 | 1 |
| 17 | Canada | 0 | 0 | 1 | 1 |
| 17 | Chinese Taipei | 0 | 0 | 1 | 1 |
| 17 | Greece | 0 | 0 | 1 | 1 |
| 17 | Romania | 0 | 0 | 1 | 1 |
| Totals (20 entries) | | 18 | 18 | 19 | 55 |

=== Artistic gymnastics ===
==== Men ====
| Games | Gold | Silver | Bronze |
|---|---|---|---|
| Team all-around | Japan; Daiki Hashimoto; Kaya Kazuma; Shinnosuke Oka; Takaaki Sugino; Wataru Tanigawa | China; Liu Yang; Su Weide; Xiao Ruoteng; Zhang Boheng; Zou Jingyuan | United States; Asher Hong; Paul Juda; Brody Malone; Stephen Nedoroscik; Fred Richard |
| Individual all-around | Shinnosuke Oka; Japan | Zhang Boheng; China | Xiao Ruoteng; China |
| Floor exercise | Carlos Yulo; Philippines | Artem Dolgopyat; Israel | Jake Jarman; Great Britain |
| Pommel horse | Rhys McClenaghan; Ireland | Nariman Kurbanov; Kazakhstan | Stephen Nedoroscik; United States |
| Rings | Liu Yang; China | Zou Jingyuan; China | Eleftherios Petrounias; Greece |
| Vault | Carlos Yulo; Philippines | Artur Davtyan; Armenia | Harry Hepworth; Great Britain |
| Parallel bars | Zou Jingyuan; China | Illia Kovtun; Ukraine | Shinnosuke Oka; Japan |
| Horizontal bar | Shinnosuke Oka; Japan | Ángel Barajas; Colombia | Zhang Boheng; China |
| Horizontal bar | Shinnosuke Oka; Japan | Ángel Barajas; Colombia | Tang Chia-hung; Chinese Taipei |

==== Women ====
| Games | Gold | Silver | Bronze |
|---|---|---|---|
| Team all-around | United States; Simone Biles; Jade Carey; Jordan Chiles; Sunisa Lee; Hezly Rivera | Italy; Angela Andreoli; Alice D'Amato; Manila Esposito; Elisa Iorio; Giorgia Villa | Brazil; Rebeca Andrade; Jade Barbosa; Lorrane Oliveira; Flávia Saraiva; Júlia Soares |
| Individual all-around | Simone Biles; United States | Rebeca Andrade; Brazil | Sunisa Lee; United States |
| Vault | Simone Biles; United States | Rebeca Andrade; Brazil | Jade Carey; United States |
| Uneven bars | Kaylia Nemour; Algeria | Qiu Qiyuan; China | Sunisa Lee; United States |
| Balance beam | Alice D'Amato; Italy | Zhou Yaqin; China | Manila Esposito; Italy |
| Floor exercise | Rebeca Andrade; Brazil | Simone Biles; United States | Ana Bărbosu; Romania |

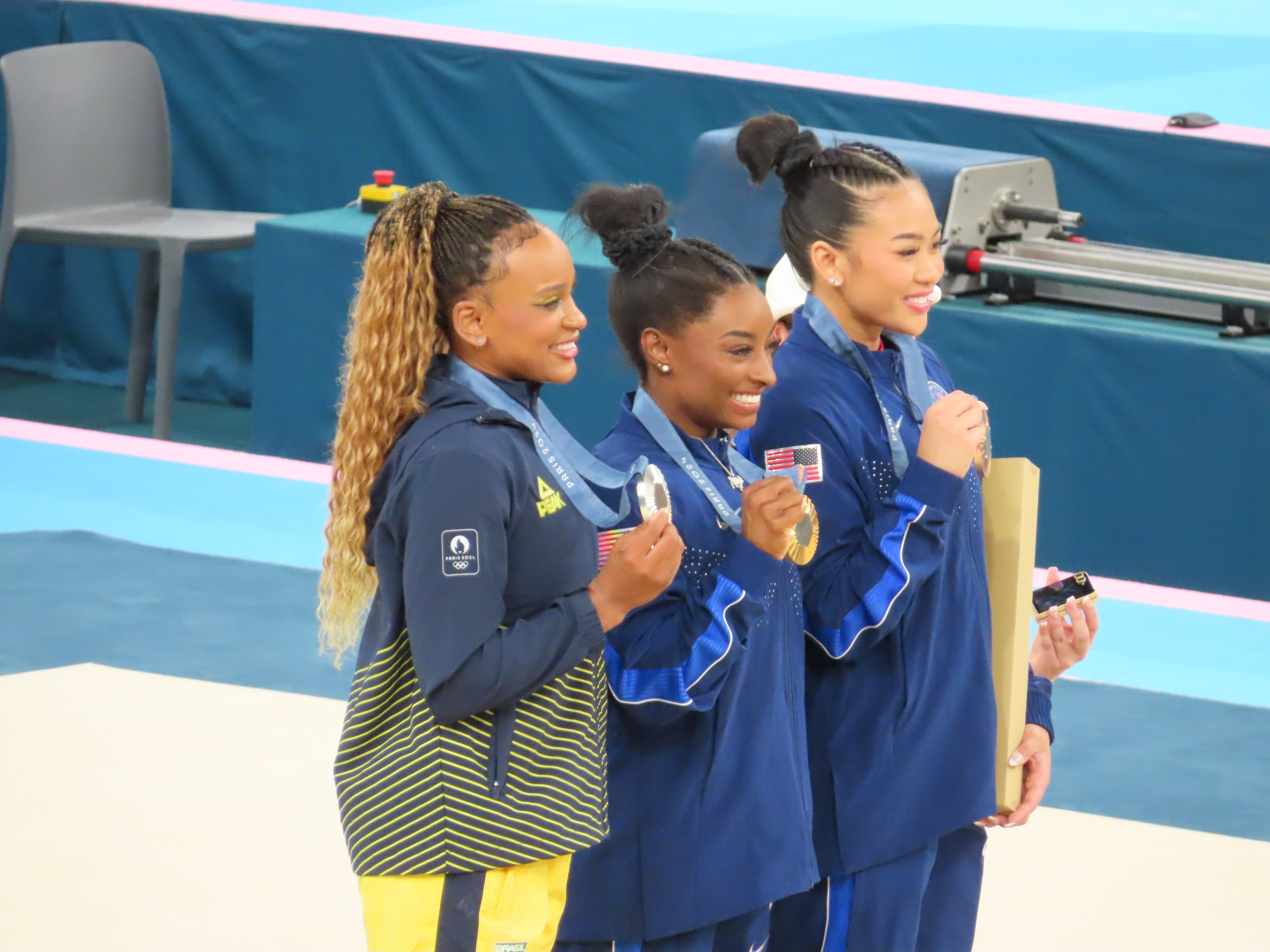
Women's individual all-around podium

=== Rhythmic gymnastics ===
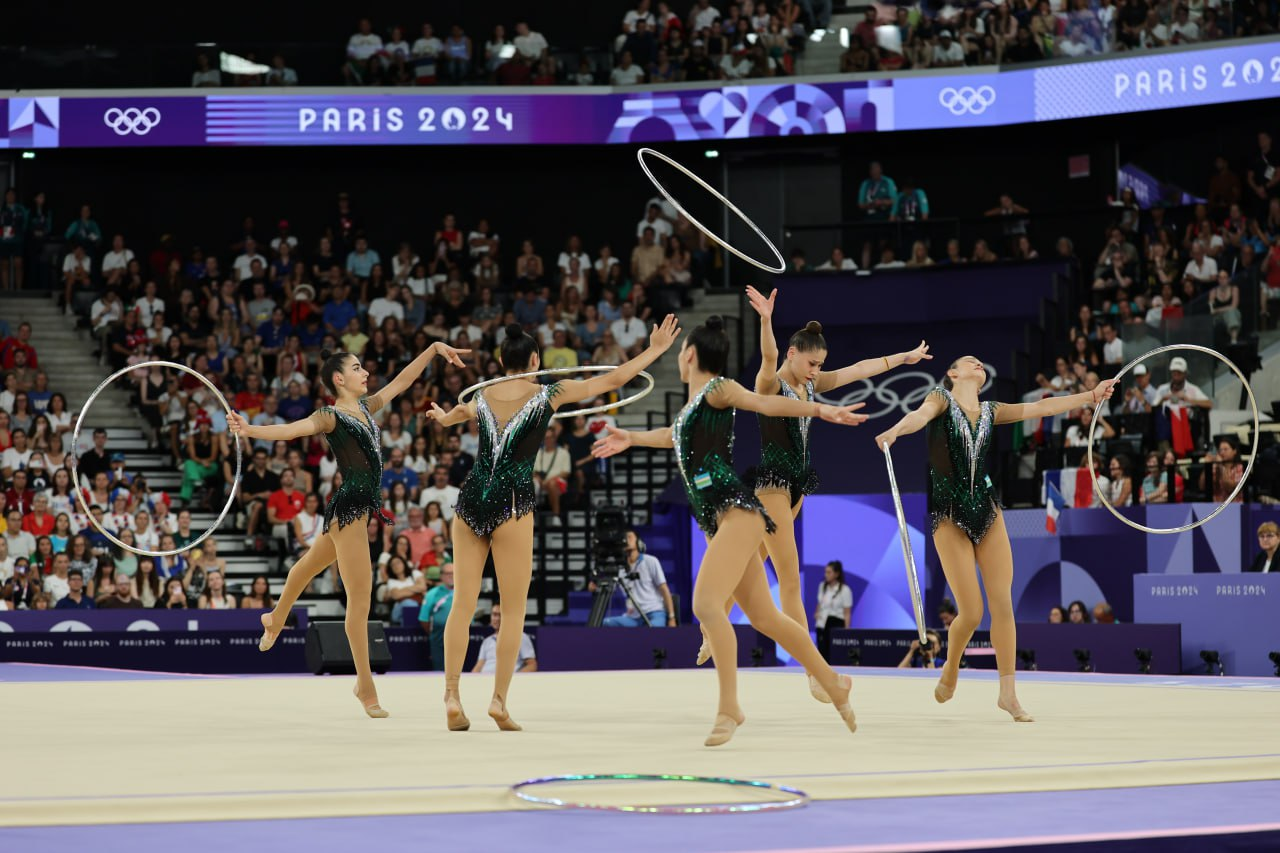
The Uzbekistan national team performing their 5 hoops routine during the group all-around final at the 2024 Summer Olympics in Paris, where they placed seventh with a score of 34.050.

| Games | Gold | Silver | Bronze |
|---|---|---|---|
| Group all-around | China; Guo Qiqi; Hao Ting; Huang Zhangjiayang; Wang Lanjing; Ding Xinyi | Israel; Ofir Shaham; Diana Svertsov; Adar Friedmann; Romi Paritzki; Shani Bakanov | Italy; Alessia Maurelli; Martina Centofanti; Agnese Duranti; Daniela Mogurean; Laura Paris |
| Individual all-around | Darja Varfolomeev; Germany | Boryana Kaleyn; Bulgaria | Sofia Raffaeli; Italy |

=== Trampoline ===
| Games | Gold | Silver | Bronze |
|---|---|---|---|
| Men's individual | Ivan Litvinovich; Individual Neutral Athletes | Wang Zisai; China | Yan Langyu; China |
| Women's individual | Bryony Page; Great Britain | Viyaleta Bardzilouskaya; Individual Neutral Athletes | Sophiane Méthot; Canada |

== See also ==
- Gymnastics at the 2020 Summer Olympics
