= Gymnastics at the 2024 Summer Olympics – Women's rhythmic group all-around =

Women's rhythmic group all-around at the Games of the XXXIII Olympiad
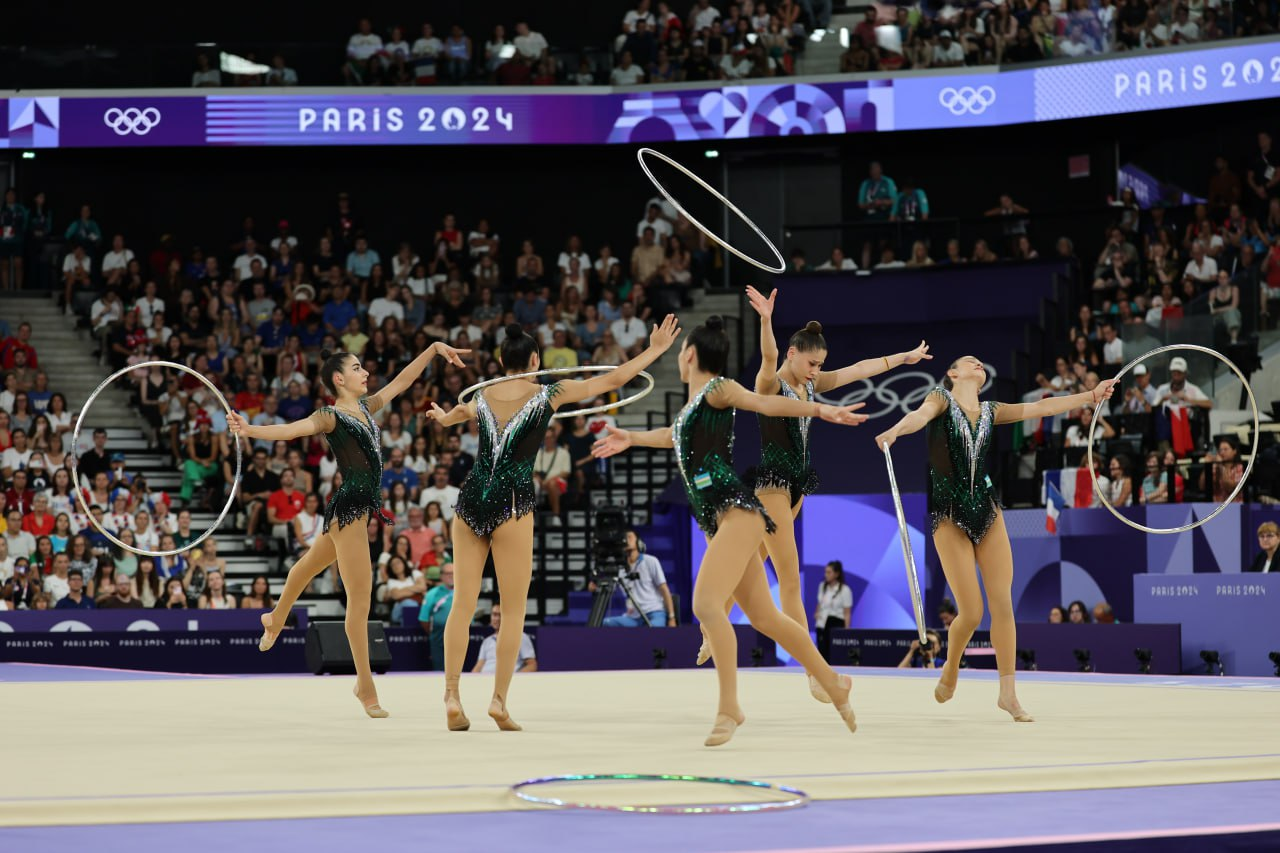
- The Uzbekistan team performs their hoop routine.
- Venue: Adidas Arena
- Date: 9 August 2024 (qualification); 10 August 2024 (final)
- Competitors: 70 from 14 nations
- Winning total: 69.800

Medalists
1st place, gold medalist(s)		Guo Qiqi; Hao Ting; Huang Zhangjiayang; Wang Lanjing; Ding Xinyi	China
2nd place, silver medalist(s)		Ofir Shaham; Diana Svertsov; Adar Friedmann; Romi Paritzki; Shani Bakanov	Israel
3rd place, bronze medalist(s)		Alessia Maurelli; Martina Centofanti; Agnese Duranti; Daniela Mogurean; Laura Paris	Italy

The Women's rhythmic group all-around competition at the 2024 Summer Olympics was held at the Adidas Arena in Paris, France, with the qualification taking place on 9 August and the final on 10 August.

== Competition format ==
The competition consisted of a qualification round and a final round. The top eight teams in the qualification round advance to the final round. In each round, the teams perform two routines (one with 5 hoops, one with 3 ribbons and 2 balls), with the scores added to give a total.

== Results ==
=== Qualification ===
Rank	Team	5	3 + 2	Total	Qualification
1	Bulgaria; Kamelia Petrova; Sofia Ivanova; Rachel Stoyanov; Magdalina Minevska; Margarita Vasileva	37.700 (2)	32.700 (2)	**70.400**	Q
2	Italy; Alessia Maurelli; Martina Centofanti; Agnese Duranti; Daniela Mogurean; Laura Paris	**38.200 (1)**	31.150 (6)	**69.350**	Q
3	Ukraine; Diana Baieva; Alina Melnyk; Mariia Vysochanska; Valeriia Peremeta; Kira Shyrykina	35.450 (6)	**33.500 (1)**	**68.950**	Q
4	France; Aïnhoa Dot-Espinosa; Manelle Inaho; Célia Joseph-Noël; Justine Lavit; Lozéa Vilarino	36.600 (3)	32.200 (4)	**68.800**	Q
5	China; Guo Qiqi; Hao Ting; Huang Zhangjiayang; Wang Lanjing; Ding Xinyi	35.500 (5)	32.400 (3)	**67.900**	Q
6	Israel; Ofir Shaham; Diana Svertsov; Adar Friedmann; Romi Paritzki; Shani Bakanov	35.250 (7)	31.900 (5)	**67.150**	Q
7	Uzbekistan; Evelina Atalyants; Shakhzoda Ibragimova; Mumtozabonu Iskhokzoda; Amaliya Mamedova; Irodakhon Sadikova	33.550 (10)	30.450 (7)	**64.000**	Q
8	Azerbaijan; Gullu Aghalarzade; Laman Alimuradova; Zeynab Hummatova; Yelyzaveta Luzan; Darya Sorokina	33.850 (8)	28.150 (9)	**62.000**	Q
9	Brazil; Maria Eduarda Arakaki; Victória Borges; Déborah Medrado; Sofia Pereira; Nicole Pircio	35.950 (4)	24.950 (13)	60.900	
10	Spain; Ana Arnau; Inés Bergua; Mireia Martínez; Patricia Pérez; Salma Solaun	30.400 (13)	30.000 (8)	60.400	
11	Australia; Saskia Broedelet; Emmanouela Frroku; Lidiia Iakovleva; Phoebe Learmont; Jessica Weintraub	31.400 (11)	27.05 (11)	58.450	
12	Mexico; Dalia Alcocer; Sofía Flores; Julia Gutiérrez; Kimberly Salazar; Adirem Tejeda	29.700 (14)	27.800 (10)	57.500	
13	Germany; Anja Kosan; Daniella Kromm; Alina Oganesyan; Hannah Vester; Emilia Wickert	33.700 (9)	23.650 (14)	57.350	
14	Egypt; Lamar Behairi; Johara Eldeeb; Farida Hussein; Abeer Ramadan; Amina Sobeih	30.850 (12)	25.050 (12)	55.900	

- **Bold** — top score in each of the two routines.
- Italics — top score of all two routines.

=== Final ===
Rank	Team	5	3 + 2	Total	Notes
1st place, gold medalist(s)	China	**36.950 (1)**	32.850 (3)	69.800	
2nd place, silver medalist(s)	Israel	35.600 (5)	33.250 (2)	68.850	
3rd place, bronze medalist(s)	Italy	36.100 (3)	32.000 (4)	68.100	
4	Bulgaria	34.100 (7)	**33.700 (1)**	67.800	
5	Azerbaijan	34.850 (6)	31.600 (5)	66.450	
6	France	35.750 (4)	30.250 (7)	66.000	
7	Ukraine	36.550 (2)	29.150 (8)	65.700	
8	Uzbekistan	34.050 (8)	30.450 (6)	64.500	

- **Bold** — top score in each of the two routines.
- Italics — top score of all two routines.
