= Adi Asya Katz =

Israeli rhythmic gymnast

Adi Asia Katz
- עדי אסיה כץ
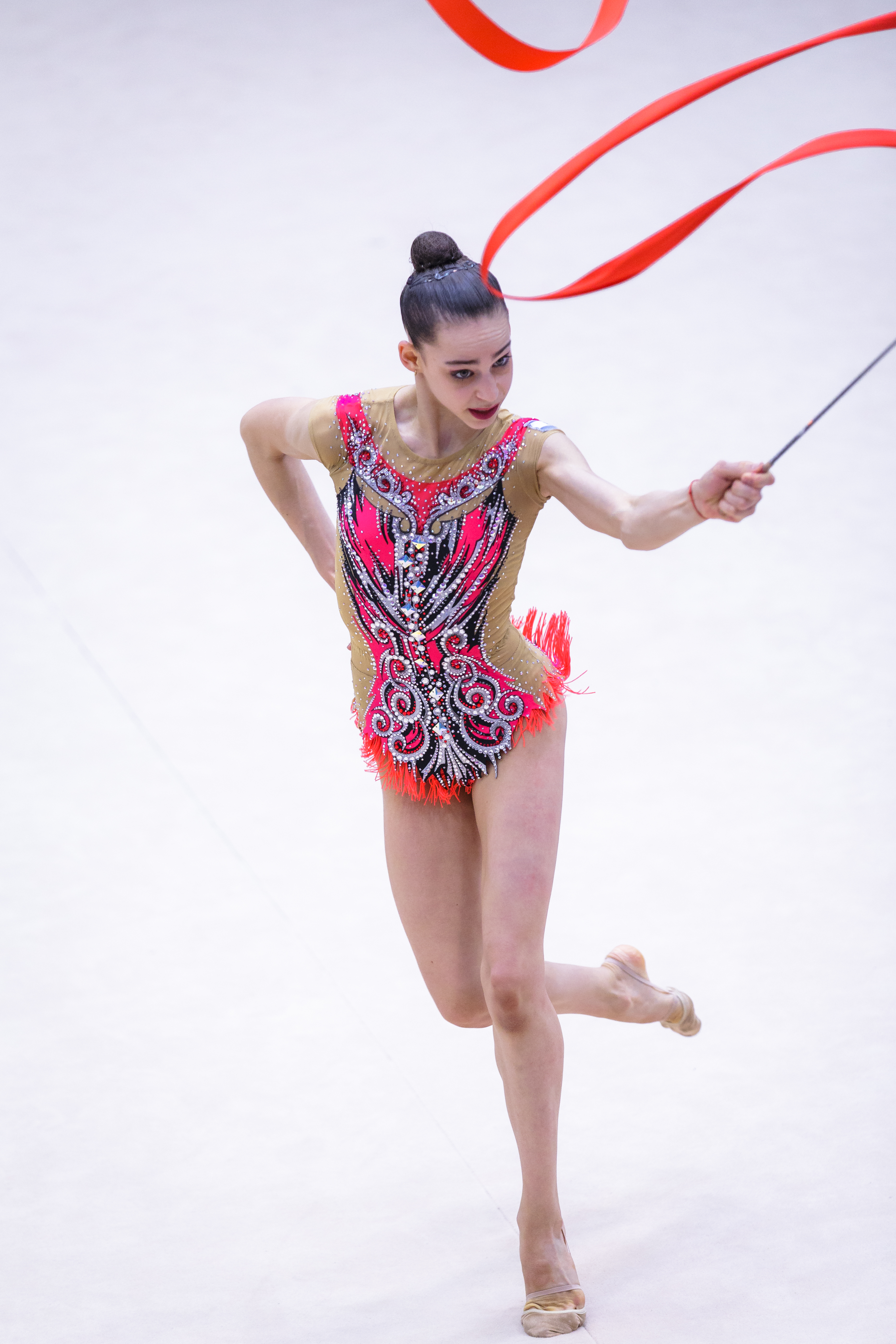
- Adi Asia Katz in 2019

Personal information
- Born: 31 March 2004 (age 22)

Gymnastics career
- Discipline: Rhythmic gymnastics
- Country represented: Israel
- Club: Maccabi Tel Aviv
- Head coach: Ella Smolov
- Assistant coach: Alona Koshevatskiy
Medal record
Representing Israel
Rhythmic Gymnastics
Event	1st	2nd	3rd
Junior World Championships	0	1	2
European Championships	0	1	3
FIG World Cup	2	6	2
Total	2	8	4
European Championships
Silver medal – second place	2023 Baku	Hoop
Bronze medal – third place	2022 Tel Aviv	Team
Bronze medal – third place	2022 Tel Aviv	Ribbon
Bronze medal – third place	2023 Baku	Team
Junior World Championships
Silver medal – second place	2019 Moscow	Ribbon
Bronze medal – third place	2019 Moscow	Clubs
Bronze medal – third place	2019 Moscow	Team

Adi Asia Katz (Hebrew: עדי אסיה כץ; born 31 March 2004) is a retired Israeli rhythmic gymnast. She is the 2022 European bronze medallist in Ribbon, and Team Bronze medallist. As a Junior, She was the 2019 Junior World silver medalist with Ribbon and bronze medalist with Clubs.

== Rhythmic gymnastics career ==
=== Junior ===
She competed at the 2018 Junior European Championships in Guadalajara, Spain, where she placed 41st in Hoop Qualifications and 8th in Ribbon Qualifications. Next day, she improved her result with Ribbon, when she placed 5th in the final. A year later, she took part in the 2019 Junior World Championships as a part of Israeli team, which won bronze medal in Team ranking. She also won silver medal in Ribbon final and bronze medal in Clubs final.

=== Senior ===
She debuted as a senior in 2020, but made her first big international appearance at World Cup Sofia in 2021. She placed 15th in All-around and qualified to Hoop final, where she ended on 8th place. Then she also competed at World Challenge Cup Minsk and placed 9th in All-around. In Clubs final, she took 6th place. On a national level, she became the all-around champion of 2021 in Israel.

She won her first-ever World Cup medal in 2022, at World Cup Baku. It was bronze in Hoop final, behind Italian Sofia Raffaeli and Bulgarian Boryana Kaleyn. Afterwards, she won another medal, silver in Clubs final at World Challenge Cup Pamplona in May. She achieved her first win at World Challenge Cup Portimão, where she won gold medal in All-around in front of Darja Varfolomeev and Eva Brezalieva, becoming the second Israeli rhythmic gymnast to win gold in All-around at FIG World Cup.

She was selected to compete at the 2022 European Championship in her home city, Katz qualified for the All-Around and ribbon finals. On Saturday she finished 11th in the All-Around final with a score of 124.450, on the same day she earned a bronze medal in the team category along with Daria Atamanov and the senior group. The next day, she had earned that bronze medal in the Ribbon competition.

At the 2023 European Championships, in Baku, Katz finished in 10th place at the individual all-around competition. She won a team bronze medal with Daniela Munits and with the Israeli senior group which consisted of Shani Bakanov, Eliza Banchuk, Adar Friedmann, Romi Paritzki, Ofir Shaham and Diana Svertsov. Katz also won a silver medal in the hoop final.

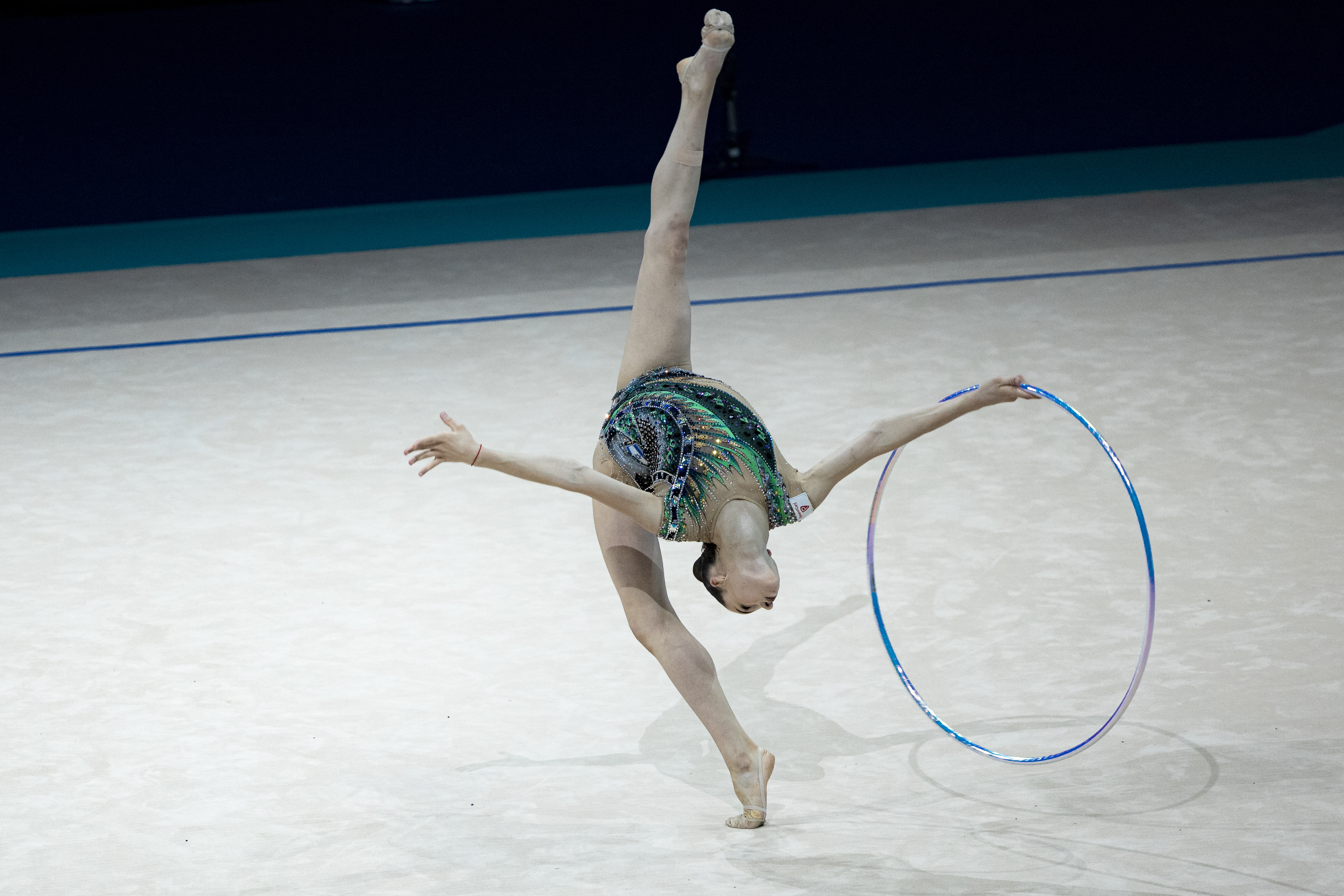
Adi Asya Katz at the European Championships 2022 in Tel Aviv

== Routine music information ==
Year	Apparatus	Music title
2023	Hoop	Sweet Dreams (Are Made of This) by Kat León
2023	Ball	Forever for Now by LP
2023	Clubs	Innuendo (Remastered 2011) by Queen
2023	Ribbon	Diles by Malú
2022	Hoop	Love Runs Out by OneRepublic
2022	Ball	Somnambule by Cœur De Pirate
2022	Clubs	Make You a Believer by THE K!X
2022	Ribbon	Total View by Inon Zur
2021	Hoop	The Illusionist by Maxime Rodriguez
2021	Ball	Just For You by Los Ultimos Romanticos
2021	Clubs	Footloose by Glee Cast
2021	Ribbon	The Ride (Instrumental) by James Horner
2020	Hoop	
2020	Ball	
2020	Clubs	
2020	Ribbon	
2019	Rope	Glam (electro-swing remix) by Dimie Cat
2019	Ball	Waltz by Eugen Doga
2019	Clubs	Long Tall Sally by Cagey String
2019	Ribbon	A Bad Kitty by Henry Jackman

== Competitive highlights ==
(Team competitions in seniors are held only at the World Championships, Europeans and other Continental Games.)

International: senior
Year	Event	AA	Team	Hoop	Ball	Clubs	Ribbon
2023	European Championships	10th	3rd	2nd	11th (Q)	12th (Q)	7th
2023	World Cup Baku	7th		9th (Q)	5th	14th (Q)	7th
2023	World Cup Sofia	4th		2nd	8th	10th (Q)	10th (Q)
2023	World Cup Palaio Faliro	12th		8th	20th (Q)	23rd (Q)	2nd
2022	World Challenge Cup Portimão	1st		1st	2nd	2nd	7th
2022	World Challenge Cup Pamplona	5th		6th	5th	2nd	5th
2022	World Cup Baku	10th		3rd	14th (Q)	14th (Q)	7th
2021	World Challenge Cup Minsk	9th		11th (Q)	10th (Q)	6th	9th (Q)
2021	World Cup Sofia	15th		8th	28th (Q)	15th (Q)	16th (Q)
Q = Qualifications (Did not advance to Event Final due to the 2 gymnast per country rule, only Top 8 highest score); WR = World Record; WD = Withdrew; NT = No Team Competition; OC = Out of Competition(competed but scores not counted for qualifications/results)
