= 2022 Rhythmic Gymnastics European Championships =

- Venue: Expo Tel Aviv
- Location: Tel Aviv, Israel
- Start date: 15 June 2022
- End date: 19 June 2022

The 2022 Rhythmic Gymnastics European Championships was the 38th edition of the Rhythmic Gymnastics European Championships, which took place on 15-19 June 2022 at the Expo Tel Aviv in Tel Aviv, Israel.

== Participating countries ==
- Andorra
- Armenia
- Austria
- Azerbaijan
- Belgium
- Bosnia and Herzegovina
- Bulgaria
- Croatia
- Cyprus
- Czech Republic
- Denmark
- Spain
- Estonia
- Finland
- France
- Great Britain
- Georgia
- Germany
- Greece
- Hungary
- Israel
- Italy
- Latvia
- Lithuania
- Luxembourg
- Moldova
- Montenegro
- Norway
- Poland
- Portugal
- Romania
- Slovenia
- San Marino
- Serbia
- Switzerland
- Slovakia
- Sweden
- Turkey
- Ukraine

Updated on May 30th 2022.

Russia and Belarus were banned from attending all international competitions.

== Competition schedule ==
- Wednesday June 15
  - 10:00–11:40 Junior individual qualification & Team ranking (Hoop, Ball, Clubs, Ribbon - SET A)
  - 12:00–13:40 Junior individual qualification & Team ranking (Hoop, Ball, Clubs, Ribbon - SET B)
  - 15:00–16:20 Junior individual qualification & Team ranking (Hoop, Ball, Clubs, Ribbon - SET C)
  - 16:40–18:10 Junior individual qualification & Team ranking (Hoop, Ball, Clubs, Ribbon - SET D)
  - 18:10–18:20 Award ceremony Junior Individuals Team
- Thursday June 16
  - 09:00–10:50 Set A Senior Individuals qualifications (hoop & ball)
  - 11:05–12:55 Set B Senior Individuals qualifications (hoop & ball)
  - 14:10–16:00 Set C Senior Individuals qualifications (hoop & ball)
  - 16:15–17:55 Set D Senior Individuals qualifications (hoop & ball)
  - 19:30–20:30 Junior Individuals Hoop & Ball Finals
  - 20:30–21:30 Junior Individuals Clubs & Ribbon Finals
  - 21:30–21:45 Award ceremony Junior individuals Apparatus finals
- Friday June 17
  - 10:00–11:50 Set C Senior Individuals qualifications (clubs & ribbon)
  - 12:05–13:55 Set D Senior Individuals qualifications (clubs & ribbon)
  - 15:10-17:00 Set A Senior Individuals qualifications (clubs & ribbon)
  - 17:00–17:30 Opening Ceremony
  - 17:30–19:20 Set B Senior Individuals qualifications (clubs & ribbon)
- Saturday June 18
  - 11:00–13:25 Senior Individuals AA Final (hoop, ball, clubs, ribbon – SET B)
  - 13:40–16:05 Senior Individuals AA Final (hoop, ball, clubs, ribbon – SET A)
  - 16:05–16:20 Award Ceremony AA Seniors Individuals
  - 17:30–18:50 Senior Groups (5 hoops and 3 ribbons & 2 balls)
  - 19:00–20:20 Senior Groups (5 hoops and 3 ribbons & 2 balls)
  - 20:20–20:45 Award Ceremony AA Senior Groups
  - 20:20–20:45 Award Ceremony Team (Senior Individuals and Senior Groups)
- Sunday June 19
  - 10:00–11:00 Senior Individuals Hoop & Ball Finals
  - 11:15–12:15 Senior Individuals Clubs & Ribbon Finals
  - 12:15-12:30 Award Ceremony Senior Individual Apparatus finals
  - 13:00–13:40 Senior Groups 5 Hoops Final
  - 13:55–14:35 Senior Groups 3 Ribbons + 2 Balls Final
  - 14:45–15:00 Award Ceremony Senior Groups Apparatus finals
  - 15:00–15:10 Closing Ceremony

== Medal winners ==
Event	Gold	Silver	Bronze
Team
Junior Team	Israel; Alona Tal Franco; Daniela Munits; Michelle Munits; Lian Rona	Romania; Christina Dragan; Amalia Lică	Bulgaria; Elvira Krasnobaeva; Dara Stoyanova
Senior Team	Bulgaria; Senior Individual; Boryana Kaleyn; Stiliana Nikolova; Senior Group; Vaya Draganova; Zhenina Trashlieva; Sofia Ivanova; Kamelia Petrova; Rachel Stoyanov; Margarita Vasileva	Italy; Senior Individual; Sofia Raffaeli; Milena Baldassarri; Senior Group; Alessia Maurelli; Martina Centofanti; Agnese Duranti; Martina Santandrea; Daniela Mogurean; Laura Paris	Israel; Senior Individual; Daria Atamanov; Adi Asya Katz; Senior Group; Shani Bakanov; Adar Friedmann; Amit Hedvat; Romi Paritzki; Ofir Shaham; Diana Svertsov
Senior Individual Finals
All-around	Daria Atamanov; Israel	Boryana Kaleyn; Bulgaria	Stiliana Nikolova; Bulgaria
Hoop	Sofia Raffaeli; Italy	Daria Atamanov; Israel	Boryana Kaleyn; Bulgaria
Ball	Boryana Kaleyn; Bulgaria	Sofia Raffaeli; Italy	Darja Varfolomeev; Germany
Clubs	Sofia Raffaeli; Italy	Daria Atamanov; Israel	Darja Varfolomeev; Germany
Ribbon	Boryana Kaleyn; Bulgaria	Daria Atamanov; Israel	Adi Asya Katz; Israel
Senior Group Finals
All-Around	Israel; Shani Bakanov; Adar Friedmann; Amit Hedvat; Romi Paritzki; Ofir Shaham; Diana Svertsov	Italy; Alessia Maurelli; Martina Centofanti; Agnese Duranti; Martina Santandrea; Daniela Mogurean; Laura Paris	Azerbaijan; Gullu Aghalarzade; Laman Alimuradova; Kamilla Aliyeva; Zeynab Hummatova; Yelyzaveta Luzan; Darya Sorokina
5 Hoops	Italy; Alessia Maurelli; Martina Centofanti; Agnese Duranti; Martina Santandrea; Daniela Mogurean; Laura Paris	Israel; Shani Bakanov; Adar Friedmann; Amit Hedvat; Romi Paritzki; Ofir Shaham; Diana Svertsov	Azerbaijan; Gullu Aghalarzade; Laman Alimuradova; Kamilla Aliyeva; Zeynab Hummatova; Yelyzaveta Luzan; Darya Sorokina
3 Ribbons + 2 Balls	Italy; Alessia Maurelli; Martina Centofanti; Agnese Duranti; Martina Santandrea; Daniela Mogurean; Laura Paris	Spain; Ana Arnau; Inés Bergua; Valeria Márquez; Mireia Martínez; Patricia Pérez; Salma Solaun	Azerbaijan; Gullu Aghalarzade; Laman Alimuradova; Kamilla Aliyeva; Zeynab Hummatova; Yelyzaveta Luzan; Darya Sorokina
Junior Individual Finals
Hoop	Elvira Krasnobaeva; Bulgaria	Liliana Lewińska; Poland	Alona Tal Franco; Israel
Ball	Michelle Munits; Israel	Elvira Krasnobaeva; Bulgaria	Christina Dragan; Romania
Clubs	Amalia Lică; Romania	Liliana Lewińska; Poland	Kamila Gafarova; Azerbaijan
Ribbon	Daniela Munits; Israel	Tara Dragas; Italy	Liliana Lewińska; Poland

== Results ==
=== Team ===
==== Junior ====
Rank	Nation	Hoop (rhythmic gymnastics)	Ball (rhythmic gymnastics)	Clubs (rhythmic gymnastics)	Ribbon (rhythmic gymnastics)	Total
1st place, gold medalist(s)	Israel	31.900	29.900	30.300	28.500	120.600
2nd place, silver medalist(s)	Romania	30.950	28.050	29.000	29.050	117.050
3rd place, bronze medalist(s)	Bulgaria	30.800	30.750	28.350	26.200	116.100
4	Ukraine	29.950	27.850	28.600	27.800	114.200
5	Italy	29.400	27.200	28.800	28.300	113.700
6	Germany	28.550	29.100	27.550	26.900	112.100
7	Azerbaijan	28.750	28.150	28.050	27.000	111.950
8	Finland	28.600	28.700	28.250	24.350	109.900
9	Spain	27.250	27.400	26.950	26.900	108.500
10	Estonia	27.750	26.500	27.100	26.600	107.450
11	France	28.300	27.850	27.100	23.150	106.400
12	Hungary	25.000	26.400	27.000	26.250	104.650
13	Greece	24.550	28.300	25.450	24.900	103.200
14	Cyprus	25.950	24.200	26.500	26.400	103.050
15	Latvia	28.000	24.150	26.850	23.650	102.650
16	Turkey	27.450	25.500	25.550	23.000	101.500
17	Slovenia	24.600	25.800	26.600	23.950	100.950
18	Switzerland	26.250	23.850	26.000	23.700	99.800
19	Georgia	25.300	23.000	26.150	24.450	98.900
20	Great Britain	24.600	22.750	25.650	23.850	96.850
21	Austria	25.850	23.150	23.750	23.600	96.350
22	Lithuania	24.850	24.900	25.000	20.700	95.450
23	Norway	24.650	24.350	24.250	21.500	94.750
24	Belgium	24.050	23.950	23.400	23.200	94.600
25	Moldova	24.850	24.650	23.350	21.520	94.100
26	Slovakia	24.400	23.250	24.450	21.550	93.650
27	Czech Republic	23.550	23.650	22.850	20.800	90.850
28	Portugal	19.200	23.900	23.950	22.750	89.800
29	Armenia	25.200	19.400	18.850	24.850	88.300
30	San Marino	23.300	23.300	22.700	18.600	87.900
31	Croatia	20.400	23.500	22.600	18.150	84.650
32	Luxembourg	16.150	19.800	19.650	17.300	72.900
33	Bosnia and Herzegovina	15.750	16.900	19.100	20.500	72.250

==== Senior ====
Rank	Nation	Total
1st place, gold medalist(s)	Bulgaria	333.150
2nd place, silver medalist(s)	Italy	325.600
3rd place, bronze medalist(s)	Israel	324.300
4	Azerbaijan	307.100
5	Germany	301.500
6	Spain	299.450
7	France	298.150
8	Ukraine	294.550
9	Hungary	293.600
10	Greece	290.850
11	Latvia	281.200
12	Poland	279.800
13	Finland	272.250
14	Georgia	272.100
15	Estonia	271.900
16	Great Britain	259.800
17	Portugal	253.100
18	Slovakia	240.200
19	Norway	234.150

=== Senior Individual ===
==== All-Around ====
Rank	Gymnast	Nation	Hoop (rhythmic gymnastics)	Ball (rhythmic gymnastics)	Clubs (rhythmic gymnastics)	Ribbon (rhythmic gymnastics)	Total
1st place, gold medalist(s)	Daria Atamanov	Israel	35.100 (2)	34.450 (1)	34.300 (1)	33.050 (2)	136.900
2nd place, silver medalist(s)	Boryana Kaleyn	Bulgaria	35.500 (1)	32.750 (6)	33.350 (3)	33.900 (1)	135.500
3rd place, bronze medalist(s)	Stiliana Nikolova	Bulgaria	34.550 (3)	34.200 (2)	31.400 (10)	31.500 (4)	131.650
4	Sofia Raffaeli	Italy	33.100 (4)	33.950 (3)	33.750 (2)	30.450	131.250
5	Darja Varfolomeev	Germany	33.050 (5)	33.200 (5)	32.700 (4)	31.700 (3)	130.650
6	Ekaterina Vedeneeva	Slovenia	32.500 (6)	31.900 (9)	32.650 (5)	30.900 (7)	127.950
7	Milena Baldassarri	Italy	31.600	33.200 (4)	31.400 (9)	31.000 (6)	127.200
8	Viktoriia Onopriienko	Ukraine	32.200 (8)	31.650	32.550 (6)	30.400	126.800
9	Zohra Aghamirova	Azerbaijan	31.800 (10)	32.000 (7)	31.850 (7)	29.800	125.450
10	Arzu Jalilova	Azerbaijan	31.600	31.950 (8)	30.750	31.050 (5)	125.350
11	Adi Asya Katz	Israel	32.050 (9)	29.950	31.550 (8)	30.900 (8)	124.450
12	Jelizaveta Polstjanaja	Latvia	32.350 (7)	30.300	30.750	29.700	123.100
13	Hélène Karbanov	France	30.300	30.900	30.750	30.800 (9)	122.750
14	Fanni Pigniczki	Hungary	31.150	30.500	29.500	30.800 (10)	121.950
15	Margarita Kolosov	Germany	31.550	31.750	30.300	27.750	121.350
16	Panagiota Lytra	Greece	31.550	31.350	30.000	28.250	121.150
17	Alba Bautista	Spain	31.600	31.650	29.500	28.100	120.850
18	Hanna Panna Wiesner	Hungary	29.050	31.800 (10)	29.050	30.300	120.200
19	Andreea Verdes	Romania	30.050	30.450	29.650	28.850	119.000
20	Annaliese Dragan	Romania	26.650	31.300	30.900	28.950	117.800
21	Melany Keler	Estonia	29.750	30.550	29.300	28.150	117.750
22	Ketevan Arbolishvili	Georgia	30.950	29.750	27.800	29.150	117.650
23	Polina Berezina	Spain	31.300	30.750	27.900	26.600	116.550
24	Lily Ramonatxo	France	29.600	29.650	28.100	27.400	114.750

==== Hoop ====
Rank	Gymnast	Nation	D Score	E Score	A Score	Pen.	Total
1st place, gold medalist(s)	Sofia Raffaeli	Italy	18.3	8.850	8.850		36.000
2nd place, silver medalist(s)	Daria Atamanov	Israel	17.3	8.900	8.700		34.900
3rd place, bronze medalist(s)	Boryana Kaleyn	Bulgaria	16.1	8.900	8.900		33.900
4	Jelizaveta Polstjanaja	Latvia	16.5	8.700	8.400		33.600
5	Viktoriia Onopriienko	Ukraine	15.8	8.600	8.450		32.850
6	Ekaterina Vedeneeva	Slovenia	15.2	8.850	8.650		32.700
7	Margarita Kolosov	Germany	15.3	8.400	8.250		31.950
8	Stiliana Nikolova	Bulgaria	14.4	7.850	8.250		30.500

==== Ball ====
Rank	Gymnast	Nation	D Score	E Score	A Score	Pen.	Total
1st place, gold medalist(s)	Boryana Kaleyn	Bulgaria	17.7	8.850	8.800		35.350
2nd place, silver medalist(s)	Sofia Raffaeli	Italy	17.1	8.400	8.750		34.250
3rd place, bronze medalist(s)	Darja Varfolomeev	Germany	16.9	8.550	8.300		33.750
4	Stiliana Nikolova	Bulgaria	16.2	8.850	8.650		33.700
5	Margarita Kolosov	Germany	16.5	8.650	8.300		33.450
6	Ekaterina Vedeneeva	Slovenia	15.5	8.900	8.750		33.150
7	Milena Baldassarri	Italy	16.0	8.550	8.550		33.100
8	Zohra Aghamirova	Azerbaijan	15.4	7.900	8.150		31.450

==== Clubs ====
Rank	Gymnast	Nation	D Score	E Score	A Score	Pen.	Total
1st place, gold medalist(s)	Sofia Raffaeli	Italy	16.6	8.950	9.000		34.550
2nd place, silver medalist(s)	Daria Atamanov	Israel	16.6	8.850	8.800		34.250
3rd place, bronze medalist(s)	Darja Varfolomeev	Germany	15.9	8.800	8.450		33.150
4	Ekaterina Vedeneeva	Slovenia	15.1	8.850	8.600		32.550
5	Stiliana Nikolova	Bulgaria	15.5	8.350	8.600		32.450
6	Zohra Aghamirova	Azerbaijan	15.4	8.450	8.300		32.150
7	Panagiota Lytra	Greece	14.5	8.400	8.350		31.250
8	Boryana Kaleyn	Bulgaria	12.9	7.850	8.650	0.300	29.100

==== Ribbon ====
Rank	Gymnast	Nation	D Score	E Score	A Score	Pen.	Total
1st place, gold medalist(s)	Boryana Kaleyn	Bulgaria	16.3	8.900	8.850		34.050
2nd place, silver medalist(s)	Daria Atamanov	Israel	16.0	8.950	8.800		33.750
3rd place, bronze medalist(s)	Adi Asya Katz	Israel	15.4	8.650	8.550		32.600
4	Stiliana Nikolova	Bulgaria	14.9	8.800	8.700		32.400
5	Ekaterina Vedeneeva	Slovenia	14.6	8.600	8.600		31.800
6	Darja Varfolomeev	Germany	14.9	8.300	8.450		31.650
7	Hélène Karbanov	France	14.1	7.850	8.350		30.300
8	Arzu Jalilova	Azerbaijan	12.7	7.700	8.100		28.500

=== Groups ===
==== Group All-Around ====
Rank	Nation	5	3, 2	Total
1st place, gold medalist(s)	Israel	36.950	33.000	69.950
2nd place, silver medalist(s)	Italy	35.650	34.000	69.650
3rd place, bronze medalist(s)	Azerbaijan	33.600	31.800	65.400
4	Bulgaria	34.650	29.500	64.150
5	Spain	34.500	28.850	63.350
6	France	31.800	31.050	62.850
7	Greece	29.500	28.950	58.450
8	Hungary	29.650	28.350	58.000
9	Poland	30.750	24.500	55.250
10	Ukraine	30.350	24.450	54.800
11	Finland	30.150	24.000	54.150
12	Germany	30.150	23.500	53.650
13	Latvia	29.500	23.300	52.800
14	Georgia	28.900	20.000	48.900
15	Estonia	20.950	27.350	48.300
16	Great Britain	25.500	20.150	45.650
17	Portugal	27.050	18.100	45.150
18	Slovakia	25.050	14.350	39.400
19	Norway	16.750	19.850	36.600

==== 5 Hoops ====
Rank	Nation	D Score	E Score	A Score	Pen.	Total
1st place, gold medalist(s)	Italy	19.0	8.600	9.050	0.000	36.650
2nd place, silver medalist(s)	Israel	18.9	8.650	8.900	0.050	36.450
3rd place, bronze medalist(s)	Azerbaijan	17.7	8.550	8.500	0.000	34.750
4	Bulgaria	17.3	7.750	8.650	0.000	33.700
5	Spain	17.4	7.600	8.250	0.000	33.250
6	Ukraine	17.4	7.950	7.700	0.000	33.050
7	France	16.2	7.700	8.400	0.300	32.000
8	Poland	15.8	6.350	7.550	0.050	29.650

==== 3 Ribbons + 2 Balls ====
Rank	Nation	D Score	E Score	A Score	Pen.	Total
1st place, gold medalist(s)	Italy	16.7	8.500	9.050	0.000	34.250
2nd place, silver medalist(s)	Spain	16.3	7.400	8.250	0.000	31.950
3rd place, bronze medalist(s)	Azerbaijan	15.4	8.050	8.450	0.000	31.900
4	Israel	15.4	7.500	8.500	0.300	31.100
5	France	14.8	7.650	8.450	0.000	30.900
6	Bulgaria	14.4	6.450	8.400	0.000	29.250
7	Greece	13.5	6.650	7.850	0.000	28.000
8	Hungary	12.4	6.300	7.600	0.000	26.300

== Medal count ==
* Host nation (Israel)

Rank	Nation	Gold	Silver	Bronze	Total
1	Israel*	5	4	3	12
2	Italy	4	4	0	8
3	Bulgaria	4	2	3	9
4	Romania	1	1	1	3
5	Poland	0	2	1	3
6	Spain	0	1	0	1
7	Azerbaijan	0	0	4	4
8	Germany	0	0	2	2
Totals (8 entries)		14	14	14	42
