= Daria Atamanov =

Israeli rhythmic gymnast

Daria Atamanov דריה אטמנוב Дарья Атаманова
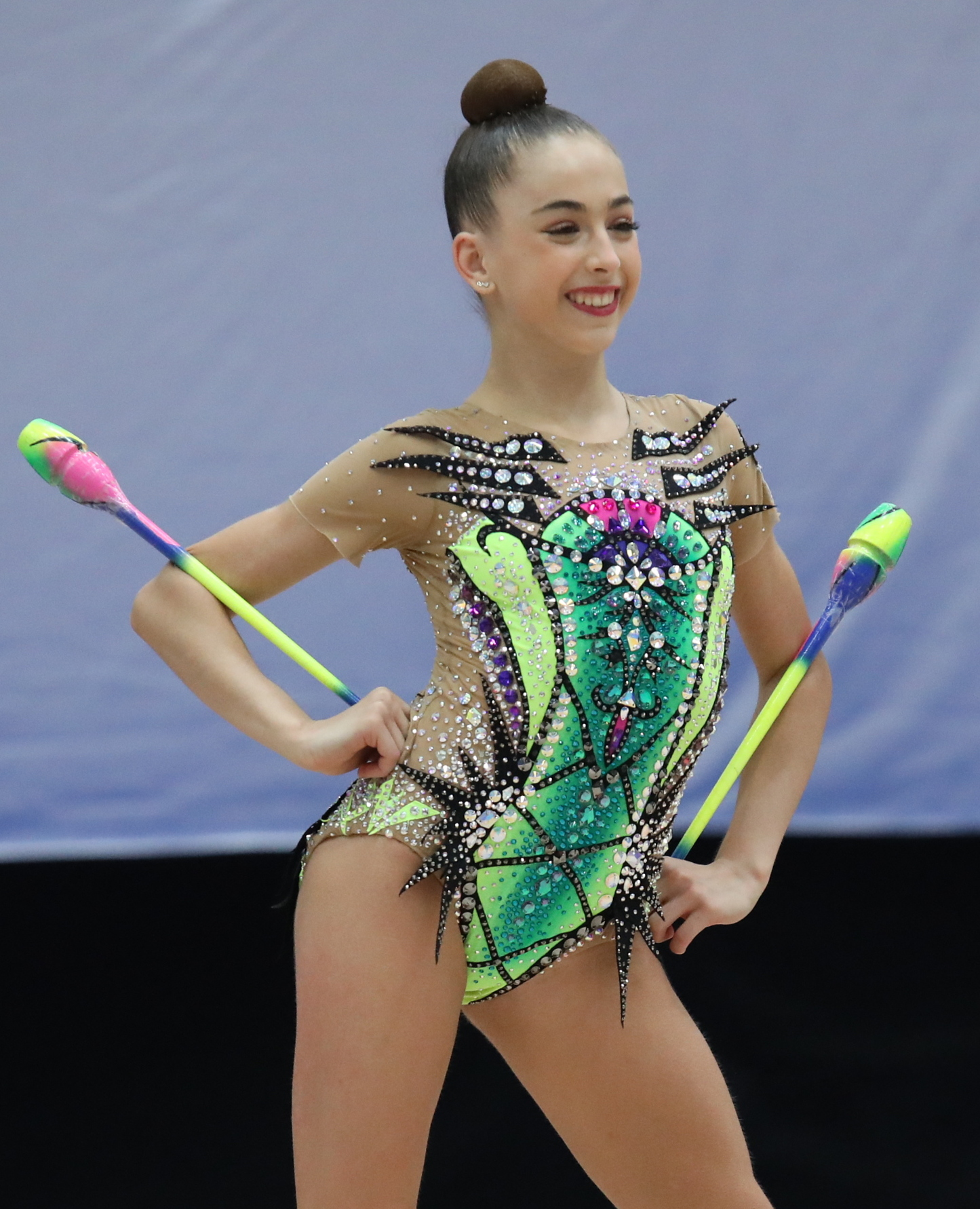
- Atamanov at the 2022 Maccabiah Games

Personal information
- Nickname: Dasha
- Born: December 6, 2005 (age 20) Tel Aviv, Israel

Gymnastics career
- Discipline: Rhythmic gymnastics
- Country represented: Israel (2020–2024)
- Club: Hapoel Rishon LeZion
- Head coaches: Ayelet Zussman; Raya Irgo
- Assistant coaches: Linoy Ashram; Ida Mayrin
- Choreographer: Ayelet Zussman
- Retired: no
Medal record
Rhythmic Gymnastics
Representing Israel
Event	1st	2nd	3rd
World Championships	0	0	1
FIG World Cup	5	6	2
European Championships	1	3	2
Junior European Championships	1	2	1
World Games	2	1	0
Maccabiah Games	5	0	0
Total	14	12	6
Representing Israel
World Championships
Bronze medal – third place	2023 Valencia	All-Around
European Championships
Gold medal – first place	2022 Tel Aviv	All-Around
Silver medal – second place	2022 Tel Aviv	Hoop
Silver medal – second place	2022 Tel Aviv	Clubs
Silver medal – second place	2022 Tel Aviv	Ribbon
Bronze medal – third place	2022 Tel Aviv	Team
Bronze medal – third place	2024 Budapest	Team
World Games
Gold medal – first place	2022 Birmingham	Ball
Gold medal – first place	2022 Birmingham	Ribbon
Silver medal – second place	2022 Birmingham	Clubs
Junior European Championships
Gold medal – first place	2020 Kyiv	Clubs
Silver medal – second place	2020 Kyiv	Rope
Silver medal – second place	2020 Kyiv	Team
Bronze medal – third place	2020 Kyiv	Ribbon
European Cup
Bronze medal – third place	2024 Baku	Cross battle
Maccabiah Games
Gold medal – first place	2022 Jerusalem	All-around
Gold medal – first place	2022 Jerusalem	Hoop
Gold medal – first place	2022 Jerusalem	Ball
Gold medal – first place	2022 Jerusalem	Clubs
Gold medal – first place	2022 Jerusalem	Ribbon

Daria Atamanov (Hebrew: דריה אטמנוב, Russian: Дарья Анатольевна Атаманова; born December 6, 2005) is an Israeli individual rhythmic gymnast. She is the 2022 European all-around Champion, and the 2023 World Championship all-around bronze medalist. She is also the 2022 European Championship silver medalist in hoop, clubs, ribbon, and the team bronze medalist. On a national level, she is the 2022 & 2024 Israeli National all-around champion and a two-time (2019, 2020) Israeli Junior National all-around champion. Atamanov represented Israel at the 2024 Paris Olympics in the Women's rhythmic individual all-around and came in fifth in her first Olympics.

== Early life ==
Before Atamanov was born, her parents emigrated from Uzbekistan to Israel. She was born in Tel Aviv, Israel, and is Jewish. She attended Tomshin High School.

== Rhythmic gymnastics career ==
Atamanov took up rhythmic gymnastics at age seven. She is coached by Ayelet Zussman and by Israeli former gymnast and 2020 Olympic gold medal winner Linoy Ashram. She trains at the Wingate Institute in Israel.

Her personal philosophy is, "I always have the same goal: to feel I gave it my all and put out the best performance on the carpet. My love for this sport is what inspires me the most. I just love it. It excites me and every time I'm on the carpet, I feel that fire inside."

=== Junior ===
==== 2020: Junior European Champion ====
During her junior career, Atamanov was the 2020 Junior European Champion in Kyiv, Ukraine, with clubs. She was also the silver medallist with rope and bronze medallist with ribbon, and she was fourth in the ball final. Atamanov also captured the highest all-around Junior score.

=== Senior ===
==== 2022: European Champion ====
In the 2022 season, Atamanov debuted in March as a senior, competing at the 2022 World Cup Athens in Greece. She won a silver medal in the all-around behind Italian Sofia Raffaeli, and in the apparatus finals, she won two gold medals (with hoop and ribbon) and two silver medals (with ball and clubs). She then competed at the 2022 World Cup Baku in Azerbaijan, where she achieved 4th place in the all-around final behind Italian Milena Baldassarri and won a gold medal with clubs and silver with ribbon.

At the 2022 European Championship in Tel Aviv, Israel, on June 18, Atamanov became the European all-around champion, beating out silver medal winner Bulgarian Boryana Kaleyn. She was the second Israeli gymnast to win the European title after Linoy Ashram.

On the same day, she also won a bronze medal in the team final along with her teammates Adi Asya Katz and the Israeli senior group. The next day, Atamanov won the silver medal in hoop and clubs, both behind Sofia Raffaeli, and another silver in ribbon behind Bulgarian Boryana Kaleyn.

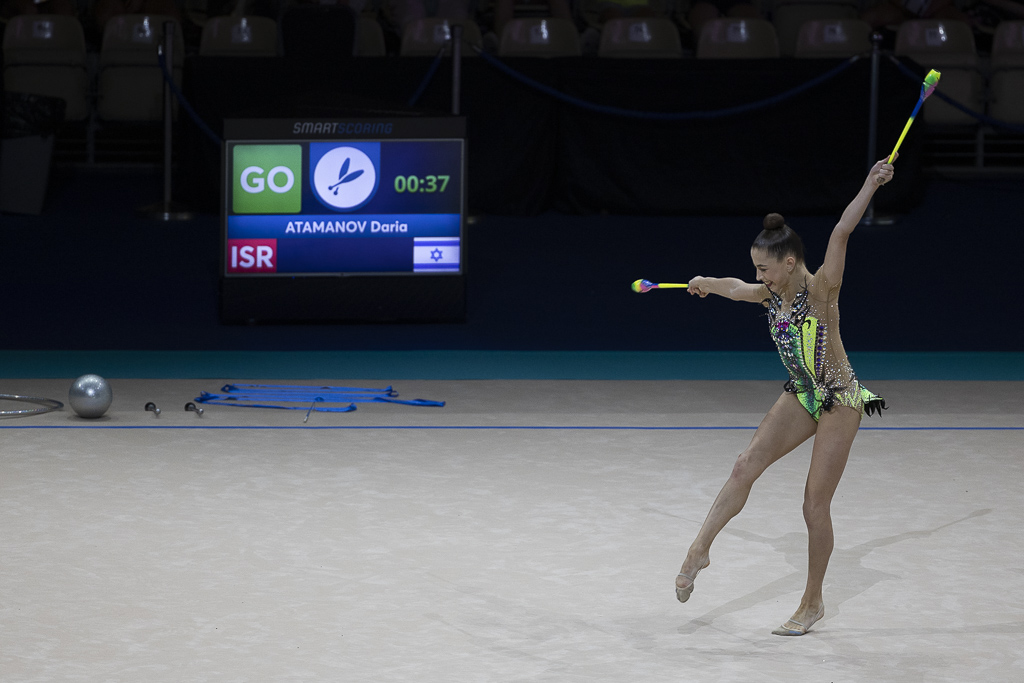
Atamanov at the 2022 European Championship in Tel Aviv

In July 2022, at the 2022 World Games in Birmingham, Alabama, Atamanov won the gold medal in ball and ribbon and the silver medal in clubs (behind Sofia Raffaeli). She became the first-ever Israeli athlete to win a gold medal at the World Games.

In August 2022 Atamanov competed at the World Challenge Cup in Cluj Napoca, Romania, where she won the bronze medal in the all-around competition, gold with the ball, and silver with the clubs and the ribbon.

Atamanov was selected to compete at the 2022 World Championships in September 2022, taking place in Sofia, Bulgaria. However, she broke her left leg in warmups while doing a jump just before the qualifying round commenced. She did not compete again until 10 months later, in July 2023, at the Milan World Cup in Italy.

==== 2023: Comeback from injury; Bronze in world championships ====
In February 2023, Forbes Israel listed her on its "30 Under 30" list.

Atamanov made her comeback in July at the 2023 World Cup in Milan. She was fourth in the all-around. In September, at the 2023 Rhythmic Gymnastics World Championships in Valencia, Spain, Atamanov finished 5th in the individual ball final and 7th with ribbon. In the all-around final, she won the bronze medal behind German gymnast Darja Varfolomeev and Sofia Raffaeli.

==== 2024: Paris Olympics ====
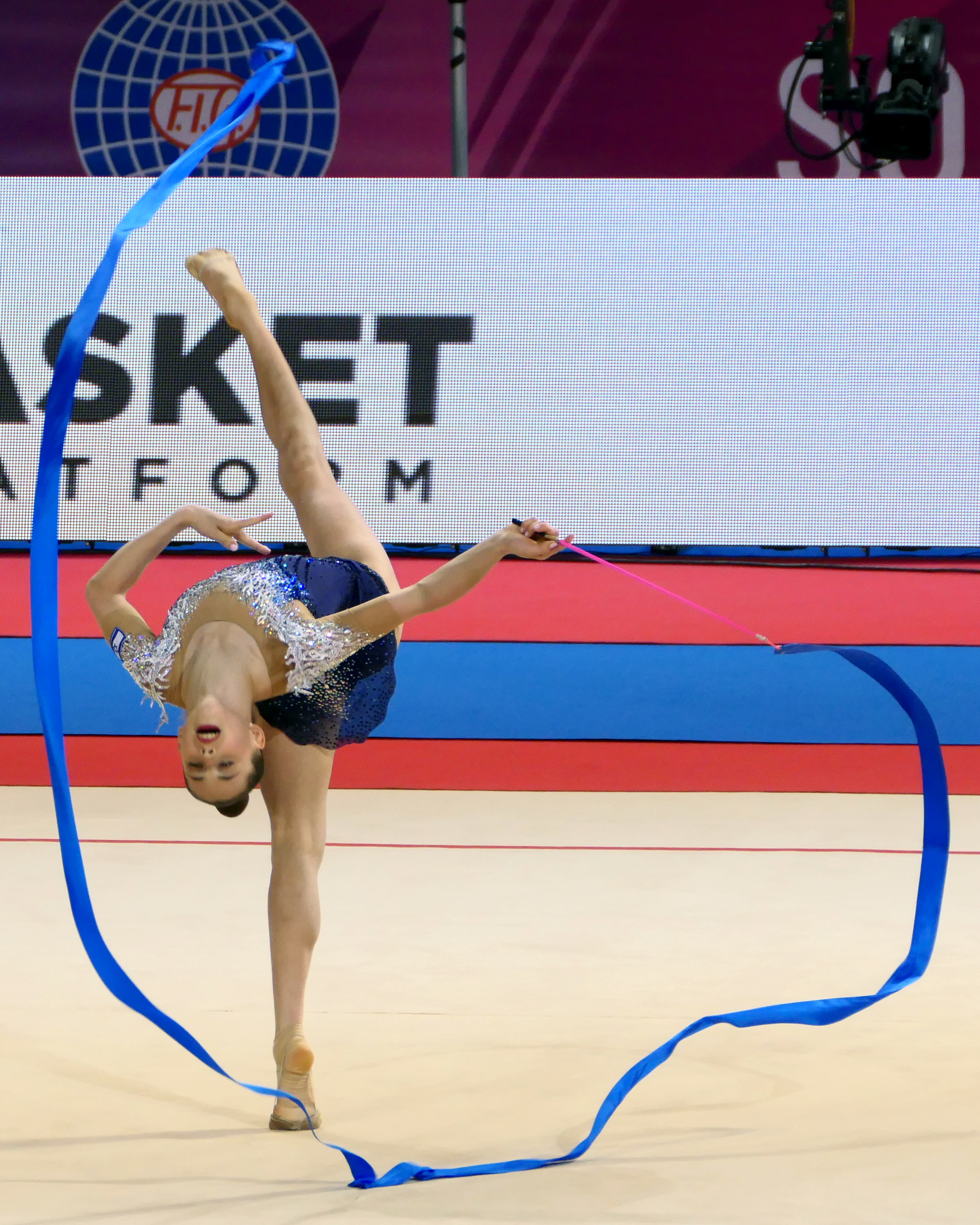
Atamanov at the 2024 Sofia World Cup

In February 2024, she was given the "Outstanding Performance" award by the European Gymnastics Union.

In March 2024 at the FIG World Cup in Palaio Faliro in Athens, Greece, Atamanov placed 5th in the all-around final and qualified for the hoop and ball final. She finished 8th with hoop and ball. The next month, at the World Cup in Sofia, Bulgaria, she won the bronze medal in the all-around behind Bulgarians Boryana Kaleyn and Stiliana Nikolova. The next day, she won the hoop title, silver with ribbon, and bronze with ball.

At the inaugural edition of the 2024 European Cup, she won the bronze medal in the all-around. On May 22-26, she represented Israel at the 2024 European Championships in Budapest, Hungary. Together with Daniela Munits and the senior group, she won the bronze medal in the team competition. She took 19th place in the all-around and qualified to two apparatus finals. She was 7th in hoop and 8th in the ribbon final.

Atamanov represented Israel at the 2024 Paris Olympics in the rhythmic individual all-around at 18 years of age. She qualified for the final, where she came in fifth all-around and was third in her best routine with the ribbon, in which she performed to Gad Elbaz's "Shir Lemaalot".

On November 26, the Israeli gymnastics federation confirmed Atamanov's retirement from competitive sport. However, the next year, on August 25, 2025, it was announced that she had returned to training.

== Routine music information ==
Year	Apparatus	Music title
2026	Hoop	
2026	Ball	L'enfant Et La Mer by Scylla and Sofiane Pamart
2026	Clubs	
2026	Ribbon	
2024	Hoop	Clash by Scylla & Sofiane Pamart
2024	Ball	Summertime (from Porgy & Bess) by Raphael Gualazzi
2024	Clubs	Tribe by Kim Viera
2024	Ribbon	שיר למעלות by Gad Elbaz
2023	Hoop	Eye of the Storm by Tarja
2023	Ball	Cucurrucucú Paloma by Silvia Perez Cruz & Raul Fernandez
2023	Clubs	Let's Get Loud by Camila Cabello, Nicholas Galitzine, Idina Menzel, Cinderella Cast
2023	Ribbon	My Nocturnal Serenade by Yohio
2022	Hoop	The Christ Trilogy by HAVASI
2022	Ball	Voila by Barbara Pravi
2022	Clubs	Wings by Little Mix
2022	Ribbon	Hydrology by Glenn Morrison
2021	Hoop	The Christ Trilogy by HAVASI
2021	Ball	Oeroun Baljaguk (Main Title) by Ryo Yoshimata
2021	Clubs	Do Something Crazy by Outasight
2021	Ribbon	Dov'è l'amore by Cher
2020	Rope	100 Rat Dash by Michael Giacchino
2020	Ball	Oeroun Baljaguk (Main Title) by Ryo Yoshimata
2020	Clubs	Do Something Crazy by Outasight
2020	Ribbon	Dov'è l'amore by Cher

== Competitive highlights ==
(Team competitions in seniors are held only at the World Championships, Europeans and other Continental Games.)

International: Senior
Year	Event	AA	Team	Hoop	Ball	Clubs	Ribbon
2024	Olympic Games	5th					
2024	World Challenge Cup Cluj-Napoca	3rd		1st	5th	3rd	7th
2024	European Championships Budapest	19th	3rd	7th	15th (Q)	29th (Q)	8th
2024	European Cup Baku	3rd		5th (Q)	7th (Q)	3rd (Q)	6th (Q)
2024	World Cup Sofia	3rd		1st	3rd	12th (Q)	2nd
2023	World Championships Valencia	3rd	4th	17th (Q)	5th	10th (Q)	7th
2023	World Cup Milan	6th		5th	21st (Q)	8th	10th (Q)
2022	World Challenge Cup Cluj- Napoca	3rd		7th	1st	2nd	2nd
2022	Maccabiah Games	1st		1st	1st	1st	1st
2022	World Games 2022			6th	1st	2nd	1st
2022	European Championships Tel Aviv	1st	3rd	2nd	23rd (Q)	2nd	2nd
2022	World Cup Baku	4th		9th (Q)	7th	1st	2nd
2022	World Cup Athens	2nd		1st	2nd	2nd	1st
International: Junior
Year	Event	AA	Team	Rope	Ball	Clubs	Ribbon
2020	Junior European Championships		2nd	2nd	4th	1st	3rd
National
Year	Event	AA	Team	Hoop	Ball	Clubs	Ribbon
2022	Israeli Championships	1st					
Q = Qualifications (did not advance to event final due to the 2 gymnasts per country rule, only Top 8 highest score); WR = World Record; WD = Withdrew; NT = No Team Competition; OC = Out of Competition (competed but scores not counted for qualifications/results), DNS = Did Not Start, DNF = Did Not Finish

== See also ==
- List of select Jewish gymnasts
- List of medalists at the Rhythmic Gymnastics Junior European Championships
- List of medalists at the Rhythmic Gymnastics World Championships
