= Ayelet Zussman =

Israeli rhythmic gymnastics coach and former gymnast

- איילת זוסמן
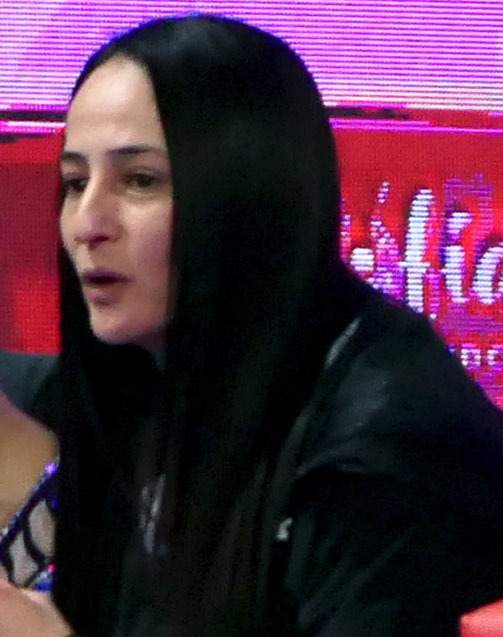
- Zussman in 2024.
- Born: March 27, 1979 (age 47)
- Education: Ruppin Academic Center
- Occupation: Head coach of the Israeli Rhythmic Gymnastics
- Known for: Trainer of Rhythmic Gymnastics in Hapoel Rishon LeZion club and coach of multiple European/World medalists and Linoy Ashram 2020 Olympic champion

Ayelet Zussman (Hebrew: איילת זוסמן; born 27 March 1979) is an Israeli rhythmic gymnastics coach and formerly a gymnast, she was champion of Israel in 1994. She is also the 2024 Paris olympic games Silver medalist team and 2020 Tokyo olympic champion Linoy Ashram coach.

== Rhythmic gymnastics career ==
Ayelet took her first steps in the world of rhythmic gymnastics when she was 6 years old. She trained for a year under former Israeli national team coach Ilanit Lazar and then went to Irina Vigdorchik as Ilanit left the country.

In 1994, at the age of 15, she became the champion of Israel, she could not repeat her achievement a year later due to a back injury and at the age of 17 she decided to end her career as an athlete. She served as a physical training officer in the general staff of the Israeli Army. At the end of military service, Ayelet was asked to remain in the army with a contract ready, but she decided to return to gymnastics, this time as a coach.

A graduate of the Ruppin Academic Center, she has a bachelor's degree in business administration and sports management.

Since 2009, she has been the coach of Linoy Ashram, a multiple winner of World and European Championships, as well as the Tokyo Olympic champion. And a choreographer for Neta Rivkin, and the rhythmic gymnastics' group.

After her achievement in Tokyo she's been appointed as the head coach of the Israeli rhythmic gymnastics team until 2028, meaning Zussman is currently not only coaching the nation's top individuals, like Daria Atamanov the 2022 European champion, but the group as well after Vigdorchik went to train the Russian team. In 2023 world championship the team group took gold medal in all-around, and Daria Atamanov won the bronze medal in all around. In the 2024 Olympics Games in Paris, the group team won the silver medal.
