= List of medalists at the Rhythmic Gymnastics Grand Prix circuit (2024–2033) =

This is a list of medalists in senior individual events at every stage of the Rhythmic Gymnastics Grand Prix circuit from 2024 to 2033. The circuit has been established in 1994 and earning medals in the different stages of the circuit is considered a prestigious achievement in the sport of rhythmic gymnastics. The list includes senior medalists in the regular stages of the circuit, as well as the Grand Prix Final. Group events, either at official Grand Prix competitions or international tournaments held alongside Grand Prix stages, are not covered in this article.

== 2024 ==
=== Events ===
Date	Event	Location	Ref.
March 2–3	2024 Miss Valentine Tartu Grand Prix	(Estonia) Tartu	
March 9–10	Grand Prix Marbella 2024	(Spain) Marbella	
March 30–31	Grand Prix Thiais 2024	(France) Thiais	
June 15–16	Grand Prix Brno 2024	(Czech Republic) Brno	

=== Medalists ===
==== Individual All-Around ====
Competitions	Gold	Silver	Bronze
Tartu	(Ukraine) Viktoriia Onopriienko	(Bulgaria) Elvira Krasnobaeva	(Ukraine) Taisiia Onofriichuk
Marbella	(Bulgaria) Stiliana Nikolova	(Uzbekistan) Takhmina Ikromova	(Germany) Darja Varfolomeev
Thiais	(Uzbekistan) Takhmina Ikromova	(France) Hélène Karbanov	(Slovenia) Ekaterina Vedeneeva
Brno	(Bulgaria) Elvira Krasnobaeva	(Ukraine) Taisiia Onofriichuk	(Ukraine) Viktoriia Onopriienko

==== Hoop ====
Competitions	Gold	Silver	Bronze
Tartu	(Ukraine) Viktoriia Onopriienko	(Bulgaria) Elvira Krasnobaeva	(Kazakhstan) Aibota Yertaikyzy
Marbella	(Germany) Darja Varfolomeev	(Ukraine) Viktoriia Onopriienko	(Slovenia) Ekaterina Vedeneeva
Thiais	(Ukraine) Viktoriia Onopriienko	(Kazakhstan) Aibota Yertaikyzy	(France) Hélène Karbanov
Brno	(Ukraine) Viktoriia Onopriienko	(Ukraine) Taisiia Onofriichuk	(Bulgaria) Elvira Krasnobaeva

==== Ball ====
Competitions	Gold	Silver	Bronze
Tartu	(Ukraine) Viktoriia Onopriienko	(Kazakhstan) Aibota Yertaikyzy	(Ukraine) Taisiia Onofriichuk
Marbella	(Kazakhstan) Elzhana Taniyeva	(Uzbekistan) Takhmina Ikromova	(Slovenia) Ekaterina Vedeneeva
Thiais	(Ukraine) Viktoriia Onopriienko	(Slovenia) Ekaterina Vedeneeva	(Kazakhstan) Aibota Yertaikyzy
Brno	(Bulgaria) Elvira Krasnobaeva	(Ukraine) Taisiia Onofriichuk	(Ukraine) Viktoriia Onopriienko

==== Clubs ====
Competitions	Gold	Silver	Bronze
Tartu	(Ukraine) Taisiia Onofriichuk	(Ukraine) Viktoriia Onopriienko	(Canada) Carmel Kallemaa
Marbella	(Bulgaria) Stiliana Nikolova	(Uzbekistan) Takhmina Ikromova	(Bulgaria) Eva Brezalieva
Thiais	(Slovenia) Ekaterina Vedeneeva	(Poland) Emilia Heichel	(France) Hélène Karbanov
Brno	(Ukraine) Viktoriia Onopriienko	(Bulgaria) Elvira Krasnobaeva	(Israel) Lian Rona

==== Ribbon ====
Competitions	Gold	Silver	Bronze
Tartu	(Ukraine) Viktoriia Onopriienko	(United States) Megan Chu	(Bulgaria) Elvira Krasnobaeva
Marbella	(Bulgaria) Stiliana Nikolova	(Slovenia) Ekaterina Vedeneeva	(Ukraine) Viktoriia Onopriienko
Thiais	(Slovenia) Ekaterina Vedeneeva	(Kazakhstan) Aibota Yertaikyzy	(Ukraine) Taisiia Onofriichuk
Brno	(Bulgaria) Elvira Krasnobaeva	(Ukraine) Taisiia Onofriichuk	(United States) Evita Griskenas

== 2025 ==
=== Events ===
Date	Event	Location	Ref.
February 28–March 2	2025 Miss Valentine Tartu Grand Prix	(Estonia) Tartu	
March 21–23	Grand Prix Marbella 2025	(Spain) Marbella	
March 29–30	Grand Prix Thiais 2025	(France) Thiais	
September 12–14	Grand Prix Brno 2025	(Czech Republic) Brno	

=== Medalists ===
==== Individual All-Around ====
Competitions	Gold	Silver	Bronze
Tartu	(Ukraine) Taisiia Onofriichuk	(Ukraine) Polina Karika	(United States) Megan Chu
Marbella	(Ukraine) Taisiia Onofriichuk	(Italy) Sofia Raffaeli	(Uzbekistan) Takhmina Ikromova
Thiais	(Ukraine) Taisiia Onofriichuk	(Italy) Tara Dragas	(Ukraine) Polina Karika
Brno	(Ukraine) Taisiia Onofriichuk	(Italy) Tara Dragas	(Ukraine) Polina Karika

==== Hoop ====
Competitions	Gold	Silver	Bronze
Tartu	(Ukraine) Taisiia Onofriichuk	(United States) Megan Chu	(Canada) Carmel Kallemaa
Marbella	(Italy) Sofia Raffaeli	(Ukraine) Taisiia Onofriichuk	(Poland) Liliana Lewinska
Thiais	(Ukraine) Taisiia Onofriichuk	(Ukraine) Polina Karika	(Italy) Tara Dragas
Brno	(Ukraine) Taisiia Onofriichuk	(Italy) Tara Dragas	(Ukraine) Polina Karika

==== Ball ====
Competitions	Gold	Silver	Bronze
Tartu	(Ukraine) Polina Karika	(Ukraine) Taisiia Onofriichuk	(United States) Megan Chu
Marbella	(Ukraine) Taisiia Onofriichuk	(Uzbekistan) Takhmina Ikromova	(Ukraine) Polina Karika
Thiais	(Ukraine) Taisiia Onofriichuk	(Uzbekistan) Anastasiya Sarantseva	(Italy) Tara Dragas
Brno	(Ukraine) Taisiia Onofriichuk	(Ukraine) Polina Karika	(Italy) Tara Dragas

==== Clubs ====
Competitions	Gold	Silver	Bronze
Tartu	(Ukraine) Taisiia Onofriichuk	(Ukraine) Polina Karika	(United States) Megan Chu
Marbella	(Ukraine) Taisiia Onofriichuk	(Italy) Sofia Raffaeli	(Ukraine) Anastasiia Ikan
Thiais	(Ukraine) Taisiia Onofriichuk	(Italy) Tara Dragas	(Ukraine) Polina Karika
Brno	(Ukraine) Polina Karika	(Kazakhstan) Aibota Yertaikyzy	(Italy) Tara Dragas

==== Ribbon ====
Competitions	Gold	Silver	Bronze
Tartu	(United States) Megan Chu	(Ukraine) Polina Karika	(Ukraine) Taisiia Onofriichuk
Marbella	(Italy) Sofia Raffaeli	(Ukraine) Taisiia Onofriichuk	(United States) Evita Griskenas
Thiais	(Ukraine) Taisiia Onofriichuk	(Italy) Tara Dragas	(Hungary) Fanni Pigniczki
Brno	(Italy) Tara Dragas	(Kazakhstan) Aibota Yertaikyzy	(Poland) Liliana Lewinska

== 2026 ==
=== Events ===
Date	Event	Location	Ref.
February 28–March 1	2026 Miss Valentine Tartu Grand Prix	(Estonia) Tartu	
March 21–22	Grand Prix Marbella 2026	(Spain) Marbella	
April 4–5	Grand Prix Thiais 2026	(France) Thiais	
September 12-13	Grand Prix Brno 2026	(Czech Republic) Brno	

=== Medalists ===
==== Individual All-Around ====
Competitions	Gold	Silver	Bronze
Tartu	(Ukraine) Taisiia Onofriichuk	(Poland) Liliana Lewinska	(Italy) Sofia Raffaeli
Marbella	(Ukraine) Taisiia Onofriichuk	(Uzbekistan) Takhmina Ikromova	(Poland) Liliana Lewinska
Thiais	(Individual Neutral Athletes) Alina Harnasko	(Individual Neutral Athletes) Maria Borisova	(Kazakhstan) Akmaral Yerekesheva
Brno	(Ukraine) Taisiia Onofriichuk	(Kazakhstan) Akmaral Yerekesheva	(Poland) Liliana Lewinska

==== Hoop ====
Competitions	Gold	Silver	Bronze
Tartu	(Ukraine) Taisiia Onofriichuk	(Bulgaria) Dara Stoyanova	(Brazil) Geovanna Santos
Marbella	(Ukraine) Taisiia Onofriichuk	(Uzbekistan) Takhmina Ikromova	(Individual Neutral Athletes) Maria Borisova
Thiais	(Italy) Tara Dragas	(Kazakhstan) Akmaral Yerekesheva	(Individual Neutral Athletes) Maria Borisova
Brno	(Kazakhstan) Akmaral Yerekesheva	(Ukraine) Polina Karika	(Uzbekistan) Lola Djuraeva

==== Ball ====
Competitions	Gold	Silver	Bronze
Tartu	(Italy) Tara Dragas	(Brazil) Geovanna Santos	(Italy) Sofia Raffaeli
Marbella	(Ukraine) Taisiia Onofriichuk	(Italy) Tara Dragas	(Uzbekistan) Takhmina Ikromova
Thiais	(Individual Neutral Athletes) Alina Harnasko	(Italy) Tara Dragas	(Individual Neutral Athletes) Maria Borisova
Brno	(Ukraine) Taisiia Onofriichuk	(Kazakhstan) Akmaral Yerekesheva	(Ukraine) Polina Karika

==== Clubs ====
Competitions	Gold	Silver	Bronze
Tartu	(Poland) Liliana Lewinska	(Italy) Tara Dragas	(Estonia) Sofia Jakovleva
Marbella	(Uzbekistan) Takhmina Ikromova	(Italy) Sofia Raffaeli	(Ukraine) Taisiia Onofriichuk
Thiais	(Individual Neutral Athletes) Maria Borisova	(Individual Neutral Athletes) Alina Harnasko	(Kazakhstan) Akmaral Yerekesheva
Brno	(Ukraine) Taisiia Onofriichuk	(Kazakhstan) Akmaral Yerekesheva	(Uzbekistan) Lola Djuraeva

==== Ribbon ====
Competitions	Gold	Silver	Bronze
Tartu	(Ukraine) Taisiia Onofriichuk	(Estonia) Sofia Jakovleva	(Poland) Liliana Lewinska
Marbella	(Ukraine) Taisiia Onofriichuk	(Individual Neutral Athletes) Maria Borisova	(Italy) Tara Dragas
Thiais	(Individual Neutral Athletes) Alina Harnasko	(Kazakhstan) Akmaral Yerekesheva	(Individual Neutral Athletes) Maria Borisova
Brno	(Poland) Liliana Lewinska	(Kazakhstan) Akmaral Yerekesheva	(Uzbekistan) Lola Djuraeva

== See also ==
- List of medalists at the Rhythmic Gymnastics Grand Prix circuit (1994–2003)
- List of medalists at the Rhythmic Gymnastics Grand Prix circuit (2004–2013)
- List of medalists at the Rhythmic Gymnastics Grand Prix circuit (2014–2023)
