= Alona Tal Franco =

Israeli rhythmic gymnast

- אלונה טל פרנקו
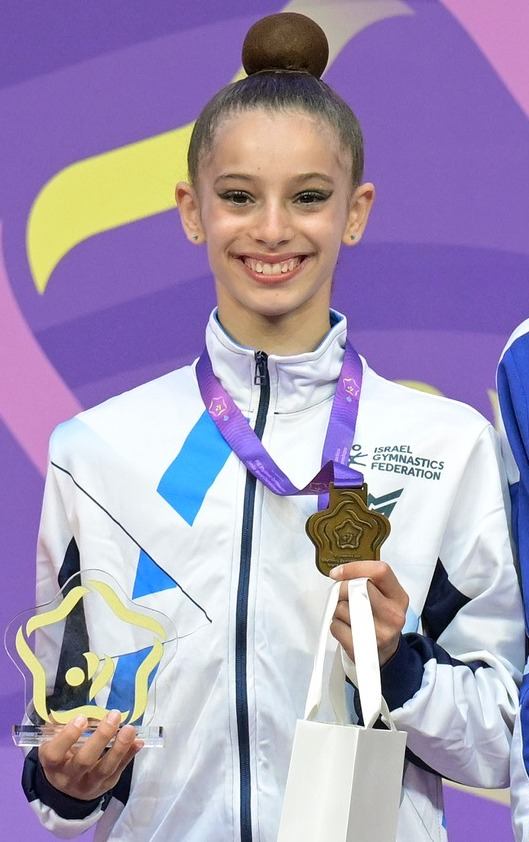
- Tal Franco at the 2023 Junior World Championships

Personal information
- Born: 7 March 2009 (age 17) Israel

Gymnastics career
- Discipline: Rhythmic gymnastics
- Country represented: Israel
- Club: Maccabi Tel Aviv
- Head coaches: Ayelet Zussman, Julieta Cantaluppi
Medal record
Representing Israel
Rhythmic Gymnastics
Event	1st	2nd	3rd
World Challenge Cup	1	0	0
Total	1	0	0
European Championships
Silver medal – second place	2026 Varna	Team
European Cup
Bronze medal – third place	2025 Burgas	Ball
Junior World Championships
Gold medal – first place	2023 Cluj-Napoca	Hoop
Silver medal – second place	2023 Cluj-Napoca	Team
Junior European Championships
Gold medal – first place	2022 Tel Aviv	Team
Silver medal – second place	2024 Budapest	Team
Silver medal – second place	2024 Budapest	Hoop
Bronze medal – third place	2022 Tel Aviv	Hoop
Bronze medal – third place	2024 Budapest	Clubs

Alona Tal Franco (Hebrew: אלונה טל פרנקו; born 7 March 2009) is an Israeli rhythmic gymnast. She is the 2023 Junior World champion with the hoop and a silver medalist in the team event and the 2024 Junior European silver medalist in the hoop and with the team. She won a gold medal in the team event at the 2022 Junior European Championships. On national level, she is the 2022 Israeli Junior all-around champion.

== Early life ==
Tal Franco was born on 7 March 2009. She has a twin brother named Adam who competes in artistic gymnastics. She was put into rhythmic gymnastics in first grade because of her natural flexibility.

== Gymnastics career ==
=== Junior ===
In June 2022, Tal Franco was selected for her first European Championships in Tel Aviv, Israel, contributing a hoop routine toward the gold medal in the team event with Daniela Munits, Michelle Munits, and Lian Rona, as well as bronze in the hoop final behind Elvira Krasnobaeva and Liliana Lewinska.

In July 2023, she competed at the Junior World Championships in Cluj-Napoca, where she became Junior World champion with the hoop, and she won silver in the team event alongside Lian Rona, Regina Polishchuk, Yael Aloni Goldblatt and the junior national group.

The following year, she competed in the 2024 European Cup in Baku, winning gold medals in the team event with Meital Maayam Sumkin and with the ball and ribbon. On 22 May, she won a team silver medal with Maayan Sumkin at the European Championships in Budapest. Additionally, she won a silver medal in the hoop final behind Amalia Lică and a bronze medal in the clubs final behind Lică and Alja Ponikvar.

=== Senior ===
Tal Franco became age-eligible for senior competitions in 2025. On 18–20 April, she made her FIG World Cup debut in Baku, and finished in 10th place in the all-around. She also qualified for the clubs final and finished eighth. Then at the 2025 European Cup, she won a bronze medal in the ball final behind Stiliana Nikolova and Vera Tugolukova.

In 2026, Alona competed at Baku World Cup and took 8th place in all-around. She took 4th place in clubs final. In May, she competed at European Cup in Baku, Azerbaijan. She was 9th in hoop, ball and clubs, and 11th in ribbon. She took silver medal in all-around behind Liliana Lewinska at Gdynia Rhythmic Stars. On May 16-17, she competed at the World Challenge Cup in Portimão. She finished 6th in the individual all-around competition, and won a gold medal in the clubs final.

In the end of May, at the 2026 European Championships in Varna, Alona finished in 12 place at the all-around final. She won silver in the team event with Daniela Munits and the Israeli senior group. She finished 4th in the clubs final. In June, she competed at 2026 World Cup Milan and took 8th place in all-around.

== Routine music information ==
Year	Apparatus	Music title
2026	Hoop	New Day Will Rise by Yuval Raphael
2026	Ball	La Cumparsita (feat. Gil Shohat) by Yasmin Levy
2026	Clubs	חביב אלבי by Static & Ben El, Nasrin Kadri
2026	Ribbon	Kiss of the Spider Woman by Jennifer Lopez, Diego Luna & Tonatiuh
2025	Hoop (First)	The Code (Orchestral Version) by Nemo & Sinfonie Orchester Biel Solothurn
2025	Hoop (Second)	New Day Will Rise by Yuval Raphael
2025	Ball	À nos folies by Léa Paci
2025	Clubs	חביב אלבי by Static & Ben El, Nasrin Kadri
2025	Ribbon	Dancin' Fool by Gary Wilmot & The Copacabana Ensemble
2024	Hoop	Burn Butcher Burn from The Witcher Season 2 Soundtrack by Joey Batey
2024	Ball	À nos folies by Léa Paci
2024	Clubs	Vengo Anch'io by Paolo Belli
2024	Ribbon	The World Has Gone Insane by Anthony Warlow
2023	Hoop	Lord & Master by Apashe
2023	Ball	Oogie Boogie's Song by Ken Page, Ed Ivory (from The Nightmare Before Christmas)
2023	Clubs	Etre Un Homme Comme Vous by Ben l'Oncle Soul
2023	Ribbon	The Waltzing Cat by Leroy Anderson
2022	Hoop	Io Kant by Banda Osiris
2022	Ball	Oogie Boogie's Song by Ken Page, Ed Ivory (from The Nightmare Before Christmas)
2022	Clubs	Etre Un Homme Comme Vous by Ben l'Oncle Soul
2022	Ribbon	The Waltzing Cat by Leroy Anderson
