= Emilov =

Emilov (Bulgarian Емилов, feminine: Emilova) is a Bulgarian surname. Notable people with the surname include:

- Eva Emilova (born 2009), Bulgarian rhythmic gymnast
- Rosen Emilov (born 1977), Bulgarian footballer
- Valeri Emilov Bojinov (born 1986), Bulgarian footballer
- Vanesa Emilova (born 2008), Bulgarian rhythmic gymnast
