= Krasimira Ivanova =

Bulgarian rhythmic gymnast

- Красимира Иванова
- Born: 6 April 2008 (age 18) Varna, Bulgaria

Gymnastics career
- Discipline: Rhythmic gymnastics
- Country represented: Bulgaria (2023-present)
- Club: KHG Gracia
- Head coach: Kristina Ilieva
Medal record
Representing Bulgaria
Rhythmic Gymnastics
Junior World Championships
Gold medal – first place	2023 Cluj-Napoca	Team
Gold medal – first place	2023 Cluj-Napoca	Group All-Around
Silver medal – second place	2023 Cluj-Napoca	5 Balls
Silver medal – second place	2023 Cluj-Napoca	5 Ropes
Junior European Championships
Gold medal – first place	2023 Baku	5 Balls
Gold medal – first place	2023 Baku	5 Ropes
Silver medal – second place	2023 Baku	All-Around

Krasimira Ivanova (born 6 April 2008) is a Bulgarian rhythmic gymnast. She is the 2023 world and European Junior champion with the Bulgarian team.

== Personal life ==
She began rhythmic gymnastics at age four at Gracia sports club in Varna after her mother told her about the sport. Her dream is to win gold medals at the European and world championships. Her idol is Russian rhythmic gymnast Aleksandra Soldatova. In her free time she enjoys spending time with family, taking walks with friends, making sweets.

== Career ==
In 2023 she won All-Around gold, 5 balls gold and 5 ropes silver at Miss Valentine. At the Sofia Tournament the junior group won gold in the All-Around and with 5 ropes, bronze with 5 balls. In May she competed at the European Championships in Baku, where she won silver in the All-Around and gold with 5 balls and 5 ropes. In July Krasimira and Eva Emilova, Andrea Ivanova, Vanesa Emilova, Gabriela Peeva, Tsveteyoana Peycheva became junior All-Around champion and won silver with 5 balls and 5 ropes at the 2nd edition of the tournament in Cluj-Napoca.

In October 2023 it was revealed she was included into the senior group for the following season, when she will enter the senior level.
