= Gabriela Peeva =

Bulgarian rhythmic gymnast

- Габриела Пеева
- Born: 7 February 2010 (age 16) Sofia, Bulgaria

Gymnastics career
- Discipline: Rhythmic gymnastics
- Country represented: Bulgaria (2023–present)
- Club: Levski
- Head coach: Kristina Ilieva
Medal record
Representing Bulgaria
Rhythmic Gymnastics
Junior World Championships
Gold medal – first place	2023 Cluj-Napoca	Team
Gold medal – first place	2023 Cluj-Napoca	Group All-Around
Silver medal – second place	2023 Cluj-Napoca	5 Balls
Silver medal – second place	2023 Cluj-Napoca	5 Ropes
Junior European Championships
Gold medal – first place	2023 Baku	5 Balls
Gold medal – first place	2023 Baku	5 Ropes
Silver medal – second place	2023 Baku	All-Around

Gabriela Peeva (Bulgarian: Габриела Пеева; born 7 February 2010) is a Bulgarian rhythmic gymnast. She is the 2023 world and European Junior champion with the Bulgarian team.

== Personal life ==
Peeva began the sport at age five as her mother enrolled her in rhythmic gymnastics. Her dream is to win a gold medal at the Olympic Games, her idols are Bulgarian rhythmic gymnasts Neviana Vladinova and Simona Dyankova. In her free time she likes walking, painting, cooking, spending time with family and friends, archery, skating.

== Career ==
In 2023 she won All-Around gold, 5 balls gold and 5 ropes silver at Miss Valentine. At the Sofia Tournament the junior group won gold in the All-Around and with 5 ropes, bronze with 5 balls. In May she competed at the European Championships in Baku, where she won silver in the All-Around and gold with 5 balls and 5 ropes. In July Gabriela and Eva Emilova, Andrea Ivanova, Krasimira Ivanova, Vanesa Emilova, Tsveteyoana Peycheva became junior All-Around champion and won silver with 5 balls and 5 ropes at the 2nd edition of the tournament in Cluj-Napoca. On 30 November it was announced she was again selected for the junior national group for 2024–2025.
