= Andrea Ivanova =

Bulgarian rhythmic gymnast

- Андреа Иванова
- Born: 5 March 2009 (age 17) Varna, Bulgaria

Gymnastics career
- Discipline: Rhythmic gymnastics
- Country represented: Bulgaria (2022/2023)
- Club: Char DKS
- Head coach: Kristina Ilieva
Medal record
Representing Bulgaria
Rhythmic Gymnastics
Junior World Championships
Gold medal – first place	2023 Cluj-Napoca	Team
Gold medal – first place	2023 Cluj-Napoca	Group All-Around
Silver medal – second place	2023 Cluj-Napoca	5 Balls
Silver medal – second place	2023 Cluj-Napoca	5 Ropes
Junior European Championships
Gold medal – first place	2023 Baku	5 Balls
Gold medal – first place	2023 Baku	5 Ropes
Silver medal – second place	2023 Baku	All-Around

Andrea Ivanova (born 5 March 2009) is a Bulgarian rhythmic gymnast. She is the 2023 world and European Junior champion with the Bulgarian team.

== Personal life ==
She took up the sport at age five after her mother took her to the gym. Her idol is Bulgarian rhythmic gymnast Simona Dyankova. Her hobbies are going for walks and watching movies. Her father Stanislav Ivanov is a multiple national champion in pentathlon and fencing, her younger brother Viktor Ivanov was the fencing champion of Bulgaria for 2021. Now he is handball player.

== Career ==
In 2023 she won All-Around gold, 5 balls gold and 5 ropes silver at Miss Valentine. At the Sofia Tournament the junior group won gold in the All-Around and with 5 ropes, bronze with 5 balls. In May she competed at the European Championships in Baku, where she won silver in the All-Around and gold with 5 balls and 5 ropes. In July Andrea and Eva Emilova, Vanesa Emilova, Krasimira Ivanova, Gabriela Peeva, Tsveteyoana Peycheva became junior All-Around champion and won silver with 5 balls and 5 ropes at the 2nd edition of the tournament in Cluj-Napoca.
