= Tsveteyoana Peycheva =

Bulgarian rhythmic gymnast

- Цветейоана Пейчева
- Nickname: Tsveti
- Born: 6 March 2009 (age 17) Pazardzhik, Bulgaria

Gymnastics career
- Discipline: Rhythmic gymnastics
- Country represented: Bulgaria; (2023)
- Club: SC Dilyana
- Head coach: Kristina Ilieva
Medal record
Representing Bulgaria
Rhythmic Gymnastics
Junior World Championships
Gold medal – first place	2023 Cluj-Napoca	Team
Gold medal – first place	2023 Cluj-Napoca	Group All-Around
Silver medal – second place	2023 Cluj-Napoca	5 Balls
Silver medal – second place	2023 Cluj-Napoca	5 Ropes
Junior European Championships
Gold medal – first place	2023 Baku	5 Balls
Gold medal – first place	2023 Baku	5 Ropes
Silver medal – second place	2023 Baku	All-Around

Tsveteyoana Peycheva (born 6 March 2009) is a Bulgarian rhythmic gymnast. She is the 2023 world and European Junior champion with the Bulgarian team.

== Personal life ==
She began the sport at age four. She was interested in watching rhythmic gymnastics and her parents decided to enroll her. Her idol is Bulgarian rhythmic gymnast Laura Traets. In her free time she enjoys painting and listening to music.

== Career ==
In 2023 she won All-Around gold, 5 balls gold and 5 ropes silver at Miss Valentine. At the Sofia Tournament the junior group won gold in the All-Around and with 5 ropes, bronze with 5 balls. In May she competed at the European Championships in Baku, where she won silver in the All-Around and gold with 5 balls and 5 ropes. In July Tsveteyoana and Eva Emilova, Andrea Ivanova, Krasimira Ivanova, Gabriela Peeva, Vanesa Emilova became junior All-Around champion and won silver with 5 balls and 5 ropes at the 2nd edition of the tournament in Cluj-Napoca.
