= Nikol Todorova =

Bulgarian rhythmic gymnast (born 2008)

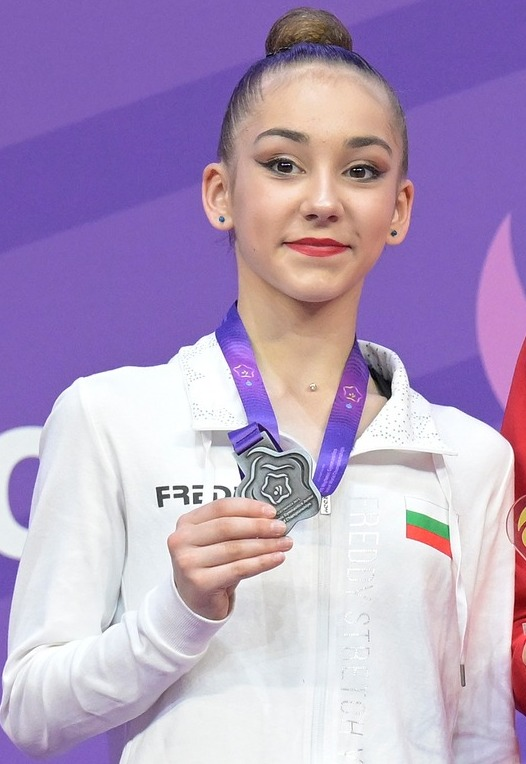

Personal information
- Born: 20 April 2008 (age 18) Sofia, Bulgaria

Gymnastics career
- Discipline: Rhythmic gymnastics
- Country represented: Bulgaria; (2021-present)
- Head coach: Raina Tosheva
Medal record
Representing Bulgaria
Rhythmic Gymnastics
Junior World Championships
Gold medal – first place	2023 Cluj-Napoca	Team
Silver medal – second place	2023 Cluj-Napoca	Ribbon

Nikol Todorova (born 20 April 2008) is a Bulgarian rhythmic gymnast. She is the 2023 junior world champion in teams and the silver medalist with ribbon. At national level she is the 2021 Junior all-around champion and the 2022 and 2023 Junior all-around silver medalist.

== Career ==
=== Junior ===
In 2021 Nikol was included into the Bulgarian national team in anticipation of the junior European and World Championships in 2022/2023. She then went on to became the national runner-up behind Elvira Krasnobaeva and ahead Zhana Pencheva.

Todorova started the 2023 season at the Miss Valentine Tournament in Tartu, along Elvira Krasnobaeva, Dara Stoyanova and Dara Malinova she won silver in the FIG junior even behind Ukraine and above Kazakhstan. She also qualified for finals, taking 4th place with clubs and winning bronze with ribbon. In July she competed at the Junior World Championships in Cluj-Napoca, where she won gold in teams alongside Krasnobaeva and the junior national group as well as a silver medal with ribbon.

=== Senior ===
In 2024, she made her debut in the senior category competing in the Gracia Fair Cup, in Hungary, where she won gold in the all-around, and two silver medals in the hoop and ribbon finals. In April he competed in the IT Sofia, and won gold in the ribbon final. That same month she competed in her first World Cup in Tashkent alongside Boryana Kaleyn, where she placed 13th in the all-around, and eighth in the hoop final.

In 2025, after the withdrawal of Boryana Kaleyn and the departure from the national team of Elvira Krasnobaeva, it allowed Todorova to advance in the Bulgarian ranking, positioning herself at the first control of the year as the third best gymnast behind Stiliana Nikolova and Eva Brezalieva. She competed at International tournament Sofia Cup in March and took 4th place in Hoop, Ball and Clubs Qualifications and 8th in Ribbon.

== Routine music information ==
Year	Apparatus	Music Title
2025	Hoop	Spikey Cars (Extended Version) by Junkie XL
2025	Ball	Tous les blues sont écrits pour toi by Celine Dion
2025	Clubs	The Final Countdown (Swing Metal Cover) by Connor Engstrom
2025	Ribbon	Village Attack by James Newton Howard & Pete Anthony
2024	Hoop	Madcap Masquerade / Smoke And Mirrors by Caleb Swift, Garrett Weyenberg & Hypersonic Music
2024	Ball	Tous les blues sont écrits pour toi by Celine Dion
2024	Clubs	Conga (Psyk Remix) by Gloria Estefan & Miami Sound Machine
2024	Ribbon	Village Attack by James Newton Howard & Pete Anthony
2023	Hoop	The Dance of the Fey (From "Maleficent") by Geoff Zanelli
2023	Ball	Limanda by Карван
2023	Clubs	Queen of Kings by Alessandra
2023	Ribbon	Prisencolinensinainciusol (Benny Benassi Remix) by Adriano Celentano
2022	Hoop	Winter At the Continental by Tyler Bates & Joel J. Richard
2022	Ball	Within by William Joseph
2022	Clubs	
2022	Ribbon	Prisencolinensinainciusol (Benny Benassi Remix) by Adriano Celentano
2021	Hoop	Run Boy Run by Woodkid
2021	Ball	Hypnotic by Havasi
2021	Clubs	Supernature Variations : Acte VII by Cerrone
2021	Ribbon	Makeba by Jain
