= Vanesa Emilova =

Bulgarian rhythmic gymnast

- Ванеса Емилова
- Born: 7 January 2008 (age 18) Plovdiv, Bulgaria

Gymnastics career
- Discipline: Rhythmic gymnastics
- Country represented: Bulgaria; (2023)
- Club: SKHG Trakia
- Head coach: Kristina Ilieva
Medal record
Representing Bulgaria
Rhythmic Gymnastics
Junior World Championships
Gold medal – first place	2023 Cluj-Napoca	Team
Gold medal – first place	2023 Cluj-Napoca	Group All-Around
Silver medal – second place	2023 Cluj-Napoca	5 Balls
Silver medal – second place	2023 Cluj-Napoca	5 Ropes
Junior European Championships
Gold medal – first place	2023 Baku	5 Balls
Gold medal – first place	2023 Baku	5 Ropes
Silver medal – second place	2023 Baku	All-Around

Vanesa Emilova (born 7 January 2008) is a Bulgarian rhythmic gymnast. She is the 2023 world and European Junior champion with the Bulgarian team.

== Personal life ==
She took up the sport at age three, as a young child she would go to a gymnasium where her parents worked as coaches. Her mother trained in rhythmic gymnastics while her father was involved in artistic gymnastics. She focused on rhythmic gymnastics, and her aunt Nina Sarasakalova became her first coach. Her idol is Bulgarian gymnast Maria Petrova. Outside the gym she enjoys watching artistic gymnastics and Formula One with her father, kart racing, solving the Rubik's Cube, spending time by the sea, hiking in the mountains.

== Career ==
In 2023 she won All-Around gold, 5 balls gold and 5 ropes silver at Miss Valentine. At the Sofia Tournament the junior group won gold in the All-Around and with 5 ropes, bronze with 5 balls. In May she competed at the European Championships in Baku, where she won silver in the All-Around and gold with 5 balls and 5 ropes. In July Vanesa and Eva Emilova, Andrea Ivanova, Krasimira Ivanova, Gabriela Peeva, Tsveteyoana Peycheva became junior All-Around champion and won silver with 5 balls and 5 ropes at the 2nd edition of the tournament in Cluj-Napoca.
