= Eva Emilova =

Bulgarian rhythmic gymnast

- Ева Емилова
- Born: 18 December 2009 (age 16) Sofia, Bulgaria

Gymnastics career
- Discipline: Rhythmic gymnastics
- Country represented: Bulgaria (2022-2023)
- Club: Levski
- Head coach: Kristina Ilieva
Medal record
Representing Bulgaria
Rhythmic Gymnastics
Junior World Championships
Gold medal – first place	2023 Cluj-Napoca	Team
Gold medal – first place	2023 Cluj-Napoca	Group All-Around
Silver medal – second place	2023 Cluj-Napoca	5 Balls
Silver medal – second place	2023 Cluj-Napoca	5 Ropes
Junior European Championships
Gold medal – first place	2023 Baku	5 Balls
Gold medal – first place	2023 Baku	5 Ropes
Silver medal – second place	2023 Baku	All-Around

Eva Emilova (born 18 December 2009) is a Bulgarian rhythmic gymnast. She is the 2023 world and European Junior champion with the Bulgarian team.

== Personal life ==
She took up gymnastics at age five in Sofia, after being introduced to the sport by her father. In her free time she enjoys swimming, spending time with family.

== Career ==
She became national champion in 2022. In 2023 she won All-Around gold, 5 balls gold and 5 ropes silver at Miss Valentine. At the Sofia Tournament the junior group won gold in the All-Around and with 5 ropes, bronze with 5 balls. In May she competed at the European Championships in Baku, where she won silver in the All-Around and gold with 5 balls and 5 ropes. In July Eva and Vanesa Emilova, Andrea Ivanova, Krasimira Ivanova, Gabriela Peeva, Tsveteyoana Peycheva became junior All-Around champion and won silver with 5 balls and 5 ropes at the 2nd edition of the tournament in Cluj-Napoca. She also won bronze in the national clubs competition with Levski.
