= Meital Sumkin =

Israeli rhythmic gymnast

- מיטל סומקין
- Full name: Meital Maayan Sumkin
- Born: 17 April 2009 (age 17)

Gymnastics career
- Discipline: Rhythmic gymnastics
- Country represented: Israel; (2023-present)
- Club: Hapoel Rishon Lezion
- Head coaches: Ayelet Zussman, Julieta Cantaluppi
- Assistant coaches: Natalie Malka, Ira Maidnik
Medal record
Representing Israel
Rhythmic Gymnastics
Event	1st	2nd	3rd
European Championships	0	1	2
FIG World Cup	1	0	2
Total	1	1	4
European Championships
Silver medal – second place	2025 Tallinn	Ribbon
Bronze medal – third place	2025 Tallinn	Team
Bronze medal – third place	2025 Tallinn	Ball
Junior World Championships
Gold medal – first place	2023 Cluj-Napoca	5 Balls
Gold medal – first place	2023 Cluj-Napoca	5 Ropes
Silver medal – second place	2023 Cluj-Napoca	Team
Silver medal – second place	2023 Cluj-Napoca	Group All-Around
Junior European Championships
Gold medal – first place	2023 Baku	Group All-Around
Gold medal – first place	2024 Budapest	Ball
Silver medal – second place	2023 Baku	5 Balls
Silver medal – second place	2023 Baku	5 Ropes
Silver medal – second place	2024 Budapest	Team
European Cup
Gold medal – first place	2024 Baku	Team
Gold medal – first place	2024 Baku	Ball
Gold medal – first place	2024 Baku	Ribbon
Gold medal – first place	2025 Burgas	Hoop
Gold medal – first place	2025 Burgas	Cross Battle
Silver medal – second place	2025 Burgas	Ribbon
Bronze medal – third place	2025 Burgas	Clubs

Meital Maayan Sumkin (Hebrew: מיטל מעיין סומקין; born 17 April 2009) is an Israeli rhythmic gymnast. She is the 2025 European silver medalist in ribbon and bronze medalist in ball and team, the 2024 European Junior champion in ball and team silver medalist, the 2024 European Cup junior ball and ribbon gold medalist and the 2025 European Cup Cross-Battle Champion.

On national level, Sumkin is the 2025 Israel All-around champion and the 2024 Israeli Junior All-around champion.

== Personal life ==
Sumkin has Ukrainian roots, as her father, Serhiy, comes from Poltava, Ukraine. She has one younger sister Mishel, who is a ballroom and latin dancer.

== Career ==
=== Junior ===
==== 2023 ====
Meital Sumkin was a member of the national junior group in 2023, competing at the European Championships in Baku where Meital, along Shelly Elguy, Elinor Gerts, Kseniya Kulyk, Yuval Schulman and Anat Shnaider, won gold in the All-Around and silver with 5 ball and 5 ropes. In July the group won silver in the All-Around, behind Bulgaria, and won gold in the two event finals at the 2nd Junior World Championships in Cluj-Napoca.

==== 2024 ====
In 2024 Sumkin switched to the individual modality, taking part in the 1st European Cup in Baku, winning gold in teams and with ball and ribon. She competed at the 2024 European Championships in Budapest, Hungary, and won the silver medal with her partner Alona Tal Franco in junior teams, gold medal in the ball final and also came eighth in the ribbon final.

=== Senior ===
==== 2025 ====
Sumkin turned senior in 2025. On April 18–20, she made her world cup debut in Baku and took 8th place in all-around. On May 15–18, she competed at European Cup in Burgas, Bulgaria. She won gold medal in Hoop, silver in Ribbon and bronze in Clubs and took 9th place in Ball. She beat Stiliana Nikolova in the final of Cross Battles and won gold medal.

Sumkin was selected to represent Israel together with teammates Daniela Munits and Lian Rona at the 2025 European Championships in Tallinn, Estonia. They won bronze medal in team competition together with senior group. She took 7th place in all-around qualifications and qualified to three apparatus finals. In the all-around final, she finished in 21st place, after multiple errors and serious mistakes in her hoop exercise. She won bronze medal in ball and silver in ribbon final.

In July, Sumkin won gold medal in all-around and all apparatus finals at the 2025 Israeli National Championships. Then she competed at Milan World Cup, where she took 14th place in all-around and did not advance into any apparatus finals due to many mistakes in her routines. On July 25–27, she competed at Cluj-Napoca World Challenge Cup and won her first World Cup medal, a bronze in all-around. She also won gold medal in hoop and bronze in ribbon final.

In August Sumkin made her senior World Championships debut in Rio de Janeiro, Brazil, where she took 9th place in the all-around qualifications, and advanced to the all-around final where she finished on 10th place, due to a big mistake in clubs. She qualified to ball final only, finishing 7th. Together with Daniela Munits and senior group they took 5th place in team competition.

==== 2026 ====
Sumkin started the international season in the end of March competing at Sofia World Cup. She took 5th place in all-around and won bronze medal in ribbon final. On April 17-19, she took 7th place in all-around at Baku World Cup and qualified to two apparatus finals, finishing 5th in ball and 4th in ribbon. She did not compete at the 2026 European Championships in Varna, Bulgaria due to an injury.

In August she was chosen to represent Israel at the 2026 World Championships in Frankfurt, and took 17th place in all-around final. In team competiton she placed 10th alongside Daniela Munits and senior group.

== Routine music information ==
Year	Apparatus	Music title
2026	Hoop	Adagio in G (Battlefield Version) by Imagine Music
2026	Ball	La canzone dei vecchi amanti by Delia Buglisi
2026	Clubs	Freestyler (alternative radio edit) by Bomfunk MC's
2026	Ribbon	Revenge of the Orchestra by Apashe & Magugu
2025	Hoop	Hope by NF
2025	Ball	Reckoning Song (One Day) by Asaf Avidan, The Mojos
2025	Clubs	Tit For Tat by Power-Haus, Joni Fuller
2025	Ribbon	Tudo bom by Static, Ben El
2024	Hoop	Hopeless Violin by Stefan Rodescu & Yannick Kalfayan
2024	Ball	My Favourite Things by Kylie Cantrall
2024	Clubs	
2024	Ribbon	Comédie Tragédie by Merwan Rim

== Competitive highlights ==
(Team competitions in seniors are held only at the World Championships, Europeans and other Continental Games.)

International: Senior
Year	Event	AA	Team	Hoop	Ball	Clubs	Ribbon
2026	World Championships	17th	10th	13th (Q)	12th (Q)	50th (Q)	10th (Q)
2026	World Cup Baku	7th		15th (Q)	5th	16th (Q)	4th
2026	World Cup Sofia	5th		7th	14th (Q)	8th	3rd
2025	World Championships	10th	5th	23rd (Q)	7th	11th (Q)	29th (Q)
2025	World Cup Challenge Cluj-Napoca	3rd		1st	4th	8th	3rd
2025	World Cup Milan	14th		20th (Q)	10th (Q)	12th (Q)	18th (Q)
2025	European Championships	21st	3rd	4th	3rd	15th (Q)	2nd
2025	European Cup Burgas	1st		1st	9th	3rd	2nd
2025	World Cup Baku	8th		9th (Q)	4th	12th (Q)	10th (Q)
International: Junior
Year	Event	AA	Team	Hoop	Ball	Clubs	Ribbon
2024	European Championships		2nd		1st		8th
2024	European Cup Baku		1st		1st		1st
2024	IT Sofia Cup		1st		2nd		3rd
National
Year	Event	AA	Team	Hoop	Ball	Clubs	Ribbon
2025	Israeli National Championships	1st		1st	1st	1st	1st
Q = Qualifications (Did not advance to Event Final due to the 2 gymnast per country rule, only Top 8 highest score); WR = World Record; WD = Withdrew; NT = No Team Competition; OC = Out of Competition(competed but scores not counted for qualifications/results)
