= Yael Aloni Goldblatt =

Israeli rhythmic gymnast

Yael Aloni Golblatt
- יעל אלוני גולדבלט
- Born: 10 April 2008 (age 18) Israel

Gymnastics career
- Discipline: Rhythmic gymnastics
- Country represented: Israel; (2023-2025)
- Head coach: Ayelet Zussman
- Retired: yes
Medal record
Representing Israel
Rhythmic gymnastics
Event	1st	2nd	3rd
FIG World Cup	0	1	0
Total	0	1	0
Junior World Championships
Silver medal – second place	2023 Cluj-Napoca	Team

Yael Aloni Goldblatt (Hebrew: יעל אלוני גולדבלט; born 10 April 2008) is a retired Israeli rhythmic gymnast. She is a junior World silver medalist in teams.

== Career ==
In March 2023 Yael competed at the “Aphrodite Cup” in Athens, winning bronze in the All-Around and talking 4th place with clubs and 7th with ribbon. She also took part in the AGF Trophy in Baku, but due to poor health she didn't qualify for any final. And then at the Gdynia Star, where she finished 5th with ball and ribbon. In July she was selected for the Junior World Championships in Cluj-Napoca, where she won silver in teams alongside Alona Tal Franco, Lian Rona, Regina Polishchuk and the junior national group.

She became age eligible for senior competitions in 2024. In 2025 she was incorporated in the new senior group, after the previous one retired. In April she competed in the World Cup in Baku along Agam Gev, Arina Gvozdetskaia, Kseniya Khodorkovskaya, Varvara Salenkova and Kristina Eilon Ternovski, being 8th with 3 balls & 2 hoops and winning silver with 5 ribbons. In October she announced her retirement.
