= Boyanka =

Boyanka (Bulgarian: Боянка) is a Bulgarian feminine given name. Notable people with the name include:

- Boyanka Angelova (born 1994), Bulgarian rhythmic gymnast
- Boyanka Kostova (born 1993), Bulgarian-Azerbaijani weightlifter
