= Lian Rona =

Israeli rhythmic gymnast

- ליאן רונה
- Born: 10 February 2008 (age 18) Israel

Gymnastics career
- Discipline: Rhythmic gymnastics
- Country represented: Israel; (2022-present)
- Club: Irony Holon
- Head coaches: Ayelet Zussman, Julieta Cantaluppi
- Assistant coach: Jenya Morgovsky
Medal record
Representing Israel
Rhythmic gymnastics
European Championships
Bronze medal – third place	2025 Tallinn	Team
Grand Prix Final
Bronze medal – third place	2024 Brno	Clubs
European Cup
Silver medal – second place	2025 Baku	Hoop
Junior World Championships
Silver medal – second place	2023 Cluj-Napoca	Team
Junior European Championships
Gold medal – first place	2022 Tel Aviv	Team

Lian Rona (Hebrew: ליאן רונה; born 10 February 2008) is an Israeli rhythmic gymnast. She is a European and World medalist.

== Career ==
=== Junior ===
In June 2022, Rona was selected for her first European Championships in Tel Aviv, Israel, winning gold in team with Daniela Munits, Michelle Munits, and Alona Tal Franco, she was also 7th with clubs.

In July 2023, she competed at the Junior World Championships in Cluj-Napoca, where she won silver in teams alongside Alona Tal Franco, Regina Polishchuk, Yael Aloni Goldblatt and the junior national group.

=== Senior ===
Lian turned senior in 2024. In April, she competed at International Tournament Sofia Cup and took 5th place in All-around. She won bronze medal in Clubs final. She won bronze medal in All-around behind Daria Atamanov and Daniela Munits at Israeli National Championship that year. On June 15-16, she competed at Grand Prix Brno and ended on 5th place in All-around. She also won bronze medal in Clubs final. In July, she made her World Cup debut at World Challenge Cup Cluj-Napoca, where she took 11th place in All-around. She qualified to Clubs final and ended on 8th place.

In 2025, she started her season at Sofia World Cup in April, where she took 21st place in All-around. She qualified to Hoop final and finished on 5th place. In June, Lian represented Israel together with Daniela Munits and Meital Maayam Sumkin at the 2025 European Championships in Tallinn, Estonia. She performed only with hoop, taking 9th place in qualifications. They won bronze medal in team competition together with senior group. In July, she won bronze medal behind in all-around at the 2025 Israeli National Championships. On September 13-14, she took 6th place in all-around at Brno Grand Prix.

In 2026, she took 6th place in all-around at Gdynia Rhythmic Stars. She also won silver medal in clubs and bronze in hoop final. In June, she took 15th place in all-around at World Challenge Cup in Cluj-Napoca. In July, she won gold medal in all-around at Israeli National Championships in front of Zoe Bar Shalom and Sofia Gandlin.

== Routine music information ==
Year	Apparatus	Music Title
2026	Hoop	Im Ele HaHaim by Keren Peles
2026	Ball	Solitude by Scylla & Sofiane Pamart
2026	Clubs	Tango para mi padre y Marialuna by Ashram
2026	Ribbon	What a wonderful world by 2WEI, Ali Christenhusz & Edda Hayes
2025	Hoop	Tattered Pin Block by Captain Plantain & Locked
2025	Ball	Solitude by Scylla & Sofiane Pamart
2025	Clubs	Perhaps Swayhaps by Psyk
2025	Ribbon	What a wonderful world by 2WEI, Ali Christenhusz & Edda Hayes
2024	Hoop	Sound of War by Tommee Profitt, Fleurie
2024	Ball	Beautiful That Way by Noa
2024	Clubs	Let's Go by The Northernettes
2024	Ribbon	U Plavu Zoru by Pink Martini
2023	Hoop	Flashdance... What a Feeling by Irene Cara
2023	Ball	Beautiful That Way by Noa
2023	Clubs	Unicorn (Remix) by Noa Kirel
2023	Ribbon	Kshe'Halev Boche (When The Heart Cries) by Sarit Hadad
