= Regina Polishchuk =

Israeli rhythmic gymnast

- רגינה פולישצ'וק
- Born: 28 August 2008 (age 18) Israel

Gymnastics career
- Discipline: Rhythmic gymnastics
- Country represented: Israel
- Club: Maccabi Haifa
- Head coach: Ayelet Zussman Anna viner
Medal record
Representing Israel
Rhythmic Gymnastics
Junior World Championships
Silver medal – second place	2023 Cluj-Napoca	Team
Bronze medal – third place	2023 Cluj-Napoca	Ball

Regina Polishchuk (Hebrew: רגינה פולישצ'וק; born 28 August 2008) is an Israeli rhythmic gymnast. She is the 2023 Junior World bronze medalist with ball.

== Career ==
Polishchuk competed at the 2023 Sofia International Tournament, finishing 8th with ball. In July she was selected for the Junior World Championships in Cluj-Napoca, where she won silver in teams alongside Alona Tal Franco, Lian Rona, Yael Aloni Goldblatt and the junior national group, as well bronze in the ball final.
