= 2023 Junior World Rhythmic Gymnastics Championships =

Rhythmic gymnastics competition

2nd Rhythmic Gymnastics Junior World Championships
- Venue: BT Arena
- Location: Cluj-Napoca, Romania
- Start date: 6 July 2023
- End date: 9 July 2023

The 2023 Rhythmic Gymnastics Junior World Championships was the second edition of the Rhythmic Gymnastics Junior World Championships. They were held in Cluj-Napoca, Romania, from 6 July to 9 July 2023.

== Participating nations ==
- Andorra (7)
- Armenia (4)
- Australia (10)
- Austria (1)
- Azerbaijan (7)
- Belgium (4)
- Bosnia and Herzegovina (4)
- Bolivia (8)
- Brazil (10)
- Bulgaria (8)
- Canada (8)
- Chile (10)
- Colombia (4)
- Croatia (4)
- Cyprus (8)
- Czech Republic (8)
- Egypt (10)
- Spain (9)
- Estonia (6)
- Finland (8)
- France (4)
- Great Britain (10)
- Georgia (10)
- Germany (9)
- Greece (10)
- Hungary (10)
- India (10)
- Israel (10)
- Italy (10)
- Japan (10)
- Kazakhstan (10)
- South Korea (10)
- Latvia (4)
- Lithuania (10)
- Luxembourg (2)
- Moldova (4)
- Mexico (7)
- Mongolia (8)
- Montenegro (2)
- Norway (4)
- New Zealand (4)
- Poland (7)
- Portugal (9)
- Romania (8)
- South Africa (9)
- Singapore (2)
- Slovenia (8)
- San Marino (3)
- Serbia (4)
- Switzerland (3)
- Slovakia (8)
- Thailand (1)
- Togo (1)
- Tunisia (2)
- Turkey (10)
- Ukraine (10)
- United States (10)
- Uzbekistan (10)
- Venezuela (1)
- Vietnam (1)

== Competition schedule ==
All times in local time (UTC+03:00).

- Friday, 7 July
  - All Day - Junior Individual Qualification: Hoop and Ball
  - Opening Ceremony
  - Evening - Junior Group Qualification: 5 Ropes & 5 Balls
- Saturday, 8 July
  - All Day - Junior Individual Qualification: Clubs and Ribbon
  - Junior Group Qualification: 5 Ropes & 5 Balls
  - Award Ceremony Team Ranking (RGI and RGG combined)
  - Award Ceremony RGG All-Around
- Sunday, 9 July
  - 12:00 – 12:35 - Individual Hoop Apparatus Final
  - 12:42 – 13:17 - Individual Ball Apparatus Final
  - 13:22 – 13:32 - Hoop & Ball Award Ceremonies
  - 13:37 – 14:20 - Group Final: 5 Ropes
  - 14:25 – 14:35 - Award Ceremony 5 Ropes
  - 14:40 – 15:15 - Individual Clubs Apparatus Final
  - 15:22 – 15:57 - Individual Ribbon Apparatus Final
  - 16:02 – 16:12 - Clubs & Ribbon Award Ceremonies
  - 16:17 – 17:00 - Group Final: 5 Balls
  - 17:05 – 17:15 - Award Ceremony 5 Balls

== Medal winners ==
Event	Gold	Silver	Bronze
Team Competition
Team All-Around	Bulgaria Individual: Elvira Krasnobaeva; Nikol Todorova Group: Eva Emilova; Vanesa Emilova; Andrea Ivanova; Krasimira Ivanova; Gabriela Peeva; Tsveteyoana Peycheva	Israel Individual: Lian Rona; Alona Tal Franco; Regina Polishchuk; Yael Aloni Goldblatt Group: Shelly Elguy; Elinor Gerts; Kseniya Kulyk; Yuval Schulman; Anat Shnaider; Meital Maayam Sumkin	Romania Individual: Amalia Lică; Lisa Garac Group: Arianna Alexandru; Andra Crainic; Carina Crainic; Andreea Nastasa; Alexandra Patrascu; Eva Vencu
Individual Finals
Hoop	Alona Tal Franco (ISR)	Amalia Lică (ROU)	Anastasiya Sarantseva (UZB)
Ball	Elvira Krasnobaeva (BUL)	Lada Pusch (GER)	Regina Polishchuk (ISR)
Clubs	Liliana Lewińska (POL)	Taisiia Onofriichuk (UKR)	Rin Keys (USA)
Ribbon	Liliana Lewińska (POL)	Nikol Todorova (BUL)	Mishel Nesterova (UZB)
Groups Finals
All-Around	Bulgaria; Eva Emilova; Vanesa Emilova; Andrea Ivanova; Krasimira Ivanova; Gabriela Peeva; Tsveteyoana Peycheva	Israel; Shelly Elguy; Elinor Gerts; Kseniya Kulyk; Yuval Schulman; Anat Shnaider; Meital Maayam Sumkin	Azerbaijan; Madina Aslanova; Ilaha Bahadirova; Govhar Ibrahimova; Sakinakhanim Ismayilzada; Zahra Jafarova; Ayan Sadigova
5 Ropes	Israel; Shelly Elguy; Elinor Gerts; Kseniya Kulyk; Yuval Schulman; Anat Shnaider; Meital Maayam Sumkin	Bulgaria; Eva Emilova; Vanesa Emilova; Andrea Ivanova; Krasimira Ivanova; Gabriela Peeva; Tsveteyoana Peycheva	Azerbaijan; Madina Aslanova; Ilaha Bahadirova; Govhar Ibrahimova; Sakinakhanim Ismayilzada; Zahra Jafarova; Ayan Sadigova
5 Balls	Israel; Shelly Elguy; Elinor Gerts; Kseniya Kulyk; Yuval Schulman; Anat Shnaider; Meital Maayam Sumkin	Bulgaria; Eva Emilova; Vanesa Emilova; Andrea Ivanova; Krasimira Ivanova; Gabriela Peeva; Tsveteyoana Peycheva	Azerbaijan; Madina Aslanova; Ilaha Bahadirova; Govhar Ibrahimova; Sakinakhanim Ismayilzada; Zahra Jafarova; Ayan Sadigova

== Individual ==
=== Team ===
Rank	Nation	Total
1st place, gold medalist(s)	Bulgaria	181.000
2nd place, silver medalist(s)	Israel	180.350
3rd place, bronze medalist(s)	Romania	179.100
4	Ukraine	173.400
5	Italy	170.050
6	Uzbekistan	169.900
7	Azerbaijan	167.050
8	Germany	165.950
9	Kazakhstan	162.950
10	Hungary	162.750
11	United States	161.200
12	Brazil	159.550
13	Turkey	158.900
14	Greece	158.100
15	Slovenia	156.500
16	Egypt	154.650
17	Finland	153.750
...		

=== Hoop ===
Rank	Gymnast	Nation	D Score	A Score	E Score	Pen.	Total
1st place, gold medalist(s)	Alona Tal Franco	Israel	15.200	8.300	8.150	0.05	31.600
2nd place, silver medalist(s)	Amalia Lică	Romania	14.700	8.100	8.100		30.900
3rd place, bronze medalist(s)	Anastasiya Sarantseva	Uzbekistan	14.800	7.800	8.250		30.850
4	Elvira Krasnobaeva	Bulgaria	14.700	8.000	7.950		30.650
5	Lada Pusch	Germany	14.500	7.850	8.250		30.600
6	Taisiia Onofriichuk	Ukraine	14.300	7.550	8.100		29.950
7	Vera Tugolukova	Cyprus	14.300	7.800	7.750		29.850
8	Rin Keys	United States	13.100	7.800	7.550		28.450

=== Ball ===
Rank	Gymnast	Nation	D Score	A Score	E Score	Pen.	Total
1st place, gold medalist(s)	Elvira Krasnobaeva	Bulgaria	15.300	8.250	8.550		32.100
2nd place, silver medalist(s)	Lada Pusch	Germany	14.500	8.050	8.250		30.800
3rd place, bronze medalist(s)	Regina Polishchuk	Israel	14.100	8.100	8.200	0.05	30.350
4	Liliana Lewińska	Poland	13.400	8.300	8.350	0.05	30.000
5	Vera Tugolukova	Cyprus	13.900	7.950	8.100		29.950
6	Lisa Garac	Romania	12.900	8.150	8.100		29.150
7	Nataliya Usova	Uzbekistan	13.500	7.700	7.500		28.700
8	Megan Chu	United States	12.700	7.800	7.950		28.450

=== Clubs ===
Rank	Gymnast	Nation	D Score	A Score	E Score	Pen.	Total
1st place, gold medalist(s)	Liliana Lewińska	Poland	14.200	8.550	8.250	0.05	30.950
2nd place, silver medalist(s)	Taisiia Onofriichuk	Ukraine	13.100	8.300	8.350		29.750
3rd place, bronze medalist(s)	Rin Keys	United States	12.600	8.450	8.350		29.400
4	Lian Rona	Israel	12.300	8.300	8.250		28.850
5	Amalia Lică	Romania	12.700	8.500	7.650		28.850
6	Vera Tugolukova	Cyprus	13.000	7.950	7.650		28.600
7	Lola Djuraeva	Uzbekistan	12.700	7.450	7.450		27.600
8	Boglárka Barkóczi	Hungary	11.900	7.800	7.800		27.500

=== Ribbon ===
Rank	Gymnast	Nation	D Score	A Score	E Score	Pen.	Total
1st place, gold medalist(s)	Liliana Lewińska	Poland	13.100	8.250	8.250		29.600
2nd place, silver medalist(s)	Nikol Todorova	Bulgaria	13.200	8.050	8.150		29.400
3rd place, bronze medalist(s)	Mishel Nesterova	Uzbekistan	13.000	8.000	7.950		28.950
4	Amalia Lică	Romania	12.200	8.050	7.900		28.150
5	Lada Pusch	Germany	12.100	8.100	7.650		27.850
6	Lara Manfredi	Italy	11.200	7.850	7.900		26.950
7	Yael Aloni Goldblatt	Israel	11.500	7.750	7.550		26.800
8	Taisiia Onofriichuk	Ukraine	10.900	8.000	7.550		26.450

== Group ==
=== All-Around ===
The top 8 scores in the apparatus qualifies to the group apparatus finals.

Place	Nation	5	5	Total
1st place, gold medalist(s)	Bulgaria	30.300	31.750	62.050
2nd place, silver medalist(s)	Israel	29.900	32.000	61.900
3rd place, bronze medalist(s)	Azerbaijan	29.600	29.800	59.400
4	Ukraine	28.200	29.650	57.500
5	Italy	28.900	28.600	57.500
6	Brazil	28.400	29.050	57.450
7	Romania	28.450	28.400	56.850
8	Estonia	27.100	28.500	55.600
9	Kazakhstan	27.500	27.850	55.350
10	Hungary	27.700	27.450	55.150
11	Spain	28.350	25.900	54.250
12	Japan	25.700	28.000	53.700
13	Turkey	24.000	29.000	53.000
14	Greece	25.350	26.850	52.200
15	Uzbekistan	26.050	25.650	51.700
16	Slovenia	24.700	26.850	51.550
17	Egypt	25.500	26.000	51.500
18	Poland	24.350	27.150	51.500
19	Lithuania	24.350	27.050	51.400
20	Georgia	25.200	25.300	50.500
21	Finland	23.600	25.350	48.950
22	United States	22.300	25.500	47.800
23	Germany	24.100	23.550	47.650
24	South Korea	21.800	24.650	46.450
25	Andorra	22.000	24.100	46.100
26	Slovakia	20.900	24.450	45.350
27	Portugal	22.200	20.950	43.150
28	Czech Republic	21.550	20.750	42.300
29	Great Britain	20.300	21.400	41.700
30	Chile	21.600	19.250	40.850
31	Canada	19.000	21.700	40.700
32	Kyrgyzstan	20.100	20.400	40.500
33	Mexico	21.350	19.100	40.450
34	Mongolia	13.950	16.900	30.850
35	Bolivia	10.450	18.900	29.350
36	Australia	14.500	12.350	26.850
37	South Africa	13.200	10.850	24.050

=== 5 Ropes ===
Rank	Nation	D Score	A Score	E Score	Pen.	Total
1st place, gold medalist(s)	Israel	15.600	7.900	7.250		30.750
2nd place, silver medalist(s)	Bulgaria	15.300	7.500	7.500	0.05	30.250
3rd place, bronze medalist(s)	Azerbaijan	14.400	7.500	7.100		29.000
4	Ukraine	14.000	7.500	7.450		28.950
5	Romania	13.700	7.750	7.250		28.700
6	Brazil	13.600	7.850	7.150	0.30	28.300
7	Spain	13.200	7.750	6.900	0.35	27.500
8	Italy	12.400	7.250	6.500	0.60	25.550

=== 5 Balls ===
Rank	Nation	D Score	A Score	E Score	Pen.	Total
1st place, gold medalist(s)	Israel	15.600	8.500	8.150		32.250
2nd place, silver medalist(s)	Bulgaria	14.900	8.450	7.250		30.600
3rd place, bronze medalist(s)	Azerbaijan	14.900	7.700	7.550		30.150
4	Ukraine	14.300	7.750	7.850		29.900
5	Turkey	13.900	8.050	7.250		29.200
6	Italy	14.000	7.800	7.350		29.150
7	Estonia	13.400	7.650	7.500		28.550
8	Brazil	11.700	7.400	6.700	0.30	25.500

== Medal count ==
* Host nation (Romania)

Rank	Nation	Gold	Silver	Bronze	Total
1	Bulgaria	3	3	0	6
2	Israel	3	2	1	6
3	Poland	2	0	0	2
4	Romania*	0	1	1	2
5	Germany	0	1	0	1
5	Ukraine	0	1	0	1
7	Azerbaijan	0	0	3	3
8	Uzbekistan	0	0	2	2
9	United States	0	0	1	1
Totals (9 entries)		8	8	8	24
