= Michelle Munits =

Israeli rhythmic gymnasts rhythmic gymnast

- מישל מוניץ
- Born: December 9, 2007 (age 18) Israel,

Gymnastics career
- Discipline: Rhythmic gymnastics
- Country represented: Israel (2021–present)
Medal record
Representing Israel
Rhythmic Gymnastics
Junior European Championships
Gold medal – first place	2022 Tel Aviv	Team
Gold medal – first place	2022 Tel Aviv	Ball

Michelle Munits (Hebrew: מישל מוניץ; born 2007) is an Israeli archer, former rhythmic gymnast. She is the 2022 European junior ball champion.

== Personal life ==
Her twin Daniela is also a gymnast and won gold with ribbon at the European Championships in 2022.

== Career ==
Michelle competed at the 2021 Irina Deleanu Cup, finishing 16th in the All-Around, 10th with hoop, 15th with ball, 42nd with clubs and 6th with ribbon.

International tournament in Sofia, she was 32nd with ball, 6th with clubs. In June she competed with ball at the European Championships in Tel Aviv along her twin, Alona Tal Franco, Lian Rona, the senior group and the individuals Daria Atamanov and Adi Asya Katz, where she won gold in teams and in the apparatus final. On November 26 she took part II edition of the international gala Viravolta-Jael in Santiago de Compostela.

Munits became a member of the Israeli reserve group senior when she moved up to the senior category. At the end of 2024, she announced that she had decided to leave rhythmic gymnastics to dedicate herself to archery.

== Routine music information ==
Year	Apparatus	Music Title
2022	Hoop	by
2022	Ball	Imagine by Davina Michelle
2022	Clubs	Those Were the Days by Hermes House Band
2022	Ribbon	by
2021	Hoop	Polovtsian Dances from: Prince Igor by Berliner Philharmoniker
2021	Ball	Songs my mother taught me by Nemanja Radulović
2021	Clubs	Conversation with happiness by Alexander Zatsepin
2021	Ribbon	Rock This Party by Bob Sinclair
