= Daniela Munits =

Israeli rhythmic gymnast (born 2007)

- דניאלה מוניץ
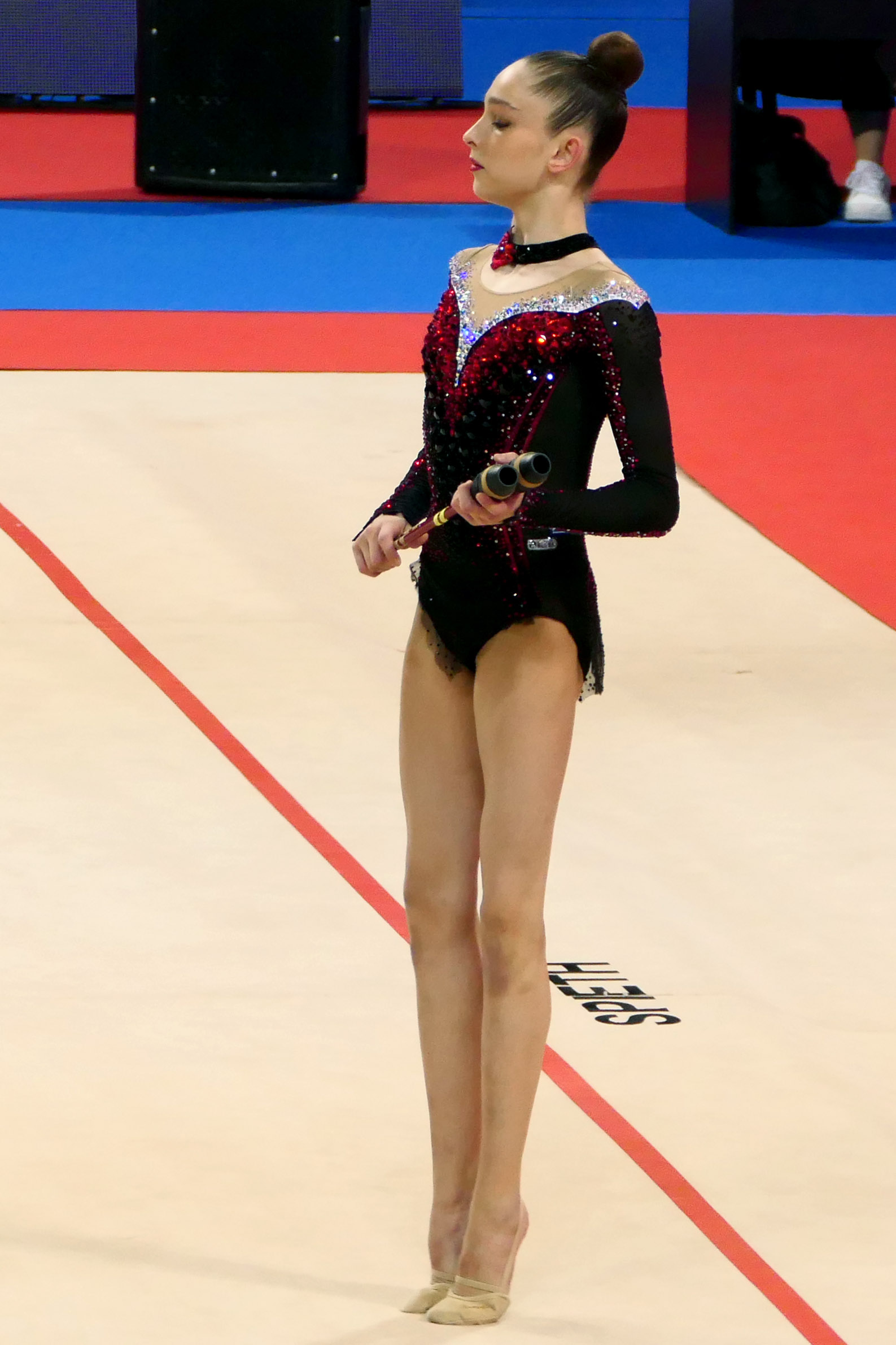
- Munits in 2024

Personal information
- Born: December 9, 2007 (age 18) Israel

Gymnastics career
- Discipline: Rhythmic gymnastics
- Country represented: Israel; (2021–present)
- Club: Maccabi Makefet Petah Tikva
Medal record
Representing Israel
Rhythmic Gymnastics
Event	1st	2nd	3rd
FIG World Cup	1	1	1
Junior European Championships	2	0	0
European Championships	1	1	5
European Cup	1	0	1
Total	5	2	7
European Championships
Gold medal – first place	2024 Budapest	Clubs
Silver medal – second place	2026 Varna	Team
Bronze medal – third place	2023 Baku	Team
Bronze medal – third place	2024 Budapest	Ball
Bronze medal – third place	2024 Budapest	Team
Bronze medal – third place	2025 Tallinn	Team
Bronze medal – third place	2026 Varna	Clubs
Junior European Championships
Gold medal – first place	2022 Tel Aviv	Team
Gold medal – first place	2022 Tel Aviv	Ribbon
European Cup
Gold medal – first place	2026 Baku	Clubs
Gold medal – first place	2026 Baku	Cross Battle
Bronze medal – third place	2024 Baku	Ball

Daniela Munits (Hebrew: דניאלה מוניץ; born 9 December 2007) is an Israeli rhythmic gymnast. She is the 2024 European clubs champion and the 2022 European junior ribbon champion.

== Personal life ==
Daniela has a twin sister, Michelle, who was also a rhythmic gymnast, and won gold with ball at the European Championships in 2022.

== Career ==
=== Junior ===
==== 2021 ====
Munits competed at the 2021 Irina Deleanu Cup, finishing 15th in the all-around and with hoop, 11th with ball, 19th with clubs and 20th with ribbon.

==== 2022 ====
In 2022, she competed at the International tournament in Sofia, where she was 31st in the all-around, 17th with hoop, and 5th with ribbon. In June she competed with ribbon at the 2022 European Championships in Tel Aviv alongside her twin Michelle Munits, Alona Tal Franco, Lian Rona, the senior group and the senior individuals Daria Atamanov and Adi Asya Katz. There she won gold in teams and in the ribbon apparatus final. On November 26, she took part in the second edition of the international gala Viravolta-Jael in Santiago de Compostela.

=== Senior ===
==== 2023 ====
In April, she made her World Cup debut at Baku World Cup, placing 24th in all-around. In May, she was part of the Israeli team that won bronze at the 2023 European Championships in Baku, Azerbaijan, along with Adi Asya Katz and the senior group. She was 15th in all-around final and qualified to ribbon final, where she ended on 8th place.

==== 2024 ====
On March 24, 2024, she won gold with ball at the World Cup in Athens, which was her first World Cup medal. In May, she competed at European Cup in Baku, and won bronze medal in ball.

On May 22-26, she represented Israel at the 2024 European Championships in Budapest, Hungary. Together with Daria Atamanov and senior group they won bronze medal in team competition. She took 5th place in all-around and qualified to three apparatus finals. She won gold in clubs, bronze in ball and finished 6th in hoop. She competed at the Milan World Cup, where she took 20th place in all-around and did not advance into any apparatus finals.

==== 2025 ====
Her first competition in 2025 was on 4–6 April, at 2025 World Cup Sofia, where she took 18th place in the all-around and did not advance into apparatus finals. In May, she competed at the 2025 European Cup in Baku, Azerbaijan and finished 6th in ball. In Cross battle part of competition, she beat Dara Malinova in 1st round with hoop and was then beaten by Taisiia Onofriichuk with ball.

In June, Daniela represented Israel together with Lian Rona and Meital Maayan Sumkin at the 2025 European Championships in Tallinn, Estonia. She took 8th place in all-around final. They won bronze medal in team competition together with senior group. In July, she won silver medal behind Meital Sumkin in all-around, hoop, clubs and ribbon and bronze in ball at the 2025 Israeli National Championships. Then she competed at Milan World Cup, where she took 10th place in all-around and only qualified to ribbon final, where she finished on 6th place. On July 25–27, she competed at Cluj-Napoca World Challenge Cup, finishing 14th in the all-around. She only qualified to hoop final and finished 8th.

In August she made her World Championships debut in Rio de Janeiro, Brazil, where she took 11th place in the all-around qualifications, and advanced to the all-around final where she finished 15th.

==== 2026 ====
Munits started the season competing at Sofia World Cup, where she took 16th place in all-around and 8th in hoop final. In May, she won the cross battle at European Cup in Baku, Azerbaijan. At the qualifications, she took gold with clubs, and finished 8th in ball. On May 16, she won a silver medal at the 2026 World Challenge Cup Portimao in the all-around competition. She qualified to hoop final, finishing 7th.

In May, at the 2026 European Championships in Varna, Daniela finished in 10th place in the all-around final. She won a silver medal in the team competition alongside Alona Tal Franco and the Israeli senior group, and a bronze medal in the clubs final. She finished 5th in the hoop, ball and ribbon finals. In July, she competed at 2026 World Cup Milan and took 4th place in all-around.

In August, at the 2026 World Championships in Frankfurt, Germany, Daniela finished in 7th place in the all-around final with 115.650 points, and in 4th place in the hoop final with 30.050 points.

== Routine music information ==
Year	Apparatus	Music Title
2026	Hoop	Freya by Power-Haus and Christian Reindl
2026	Ball 1	Donna Carmen by Pink Noisy
2026	Ball 2	Lightless by Serenity Elipse
2026	Clubs	Devil in the Details by Max Schad / Quaternion by Really Slow Motion ans Rok Nardin
2026	Ribbon	The 2nd Law: Unsustainable by Muse
2025	Hoop	Eleanor Rigby by SARAFINE
2025	Ball	Donna Carmen by Pink Noisy
2025	Clubs	Winner Won't Stop (feat. Neara Russell) by EARPARADE
2025	Ribbon	Glass Onion String Quartet in B♭ Minor by Nathan Johnson
2024	Hoop	Final Act by Power-Haus, Ros Stephen
2024	Ball	El Cosechero by Ginevra Di Marco
2024	Clubs	L'Amour Est Un Oiseau Rebelle by SARAFINE
2024	Ribbon	The Puzzle Box / Glass Onion String Quartet in B♭ Minor by Nathan Johnson
2023	Hoop	Obscura by Power-Haus & Christian Reindl
2023	Ball	El Cosechero by Ginevra Di Marco
2023	Clubs	Bossa Nova Baby / We Will Rock You by Elvis Presley and Queen
2023	Ribbon	I Put A Spell On You
2022	Hoop	
2022	Ball	
2022	Clubs	
2022	Ribbon	Rock Around the Clock / Blue Suede Shoes / Jailhouse Rock / Hound Dog / Tutti Frutti / Be Bop a Lulla / Pour le Rock and Roll by Dany Brillant
2021	Hoop	Triumph by Edvin Marton
2021	Ball	Caravan by Fabrizio Bosso & Antonello Salis
2021	Clubs	Body Funk by Purple Disco Machine
2021	Ribbon	Eye of the Tiger/ Eye of the Tiger (House) by Survivors/Djemadelgado
