= Emilia Heichel =

Polish rhythmic gymnast

- Born: 30 October 2006 (age 19) Kraków, Poland

Gymnastics career
- Discipline: Rhythmic gymnastics
- Country represented: Poland (2021–present)
- Club: SGA Kraków
- Head coach: Katarzyna Strychalska

Emilia Heichel (born 30 October 2006) is a Polish rhythmic gymnast. On national level, she is a two-time (2022, 2023) Polish national all-around champion and a three-time (2024–2026) silver medalist.

== Career ==
In 2022, Emilia made her senior debut at World Cup Baku, where she took second place in all-around. She took 14th place in ribbon. In June, she competed at World Cup Pesaro She was selected to represent Poland together with Malgorzata Roszatycka at the 2022 European Championships in Tel Aviv, Israel. They took 12th place in team competition together with Polish senior group. She took 32nd place in all-around qualifications. In November, she won Polish national all-around title. She also won gold medals in all apparatus finals.

In 2023, she competed at World Cup Palaio Faliro in Greece, where she took 18th place in all-around. Her best placement was with ball - 15th place. In March, she won her second Polish national all-around title and won 4 gold medals in apparatus finals. At World Cup Sofia in April, she took 20th place in all-around. In a less successful World Cup Baku, she placed 32nd in all-around. At the 2023 European Championships in Baku, Azerbaijan, she qualified to All-around final, where she took 20th place. In August, Emilia participated at her first World Championships in Valencia, Spain. She was 31st in all-around qualifications and did not advance into all-around final.

In 2024, she won silver medal in all-around at Polish national championships behind Liliana Lewinska. She won gold in clubs final and silver in other three apparatus. In April she won her first Grand Prix medal, silver with clubs, in Thiais. At World Cup Baku, she qualified to her first World Cup final (with clubs) and took fifth place. In May, Heichel competed at the European Championships in Budapest, Hungary, where she finished 18th in the all-around final. The Polish team won seventh place in the team competition.

In 2025, she won silver medal in all-around at the Polish National Championships behind Liliana Lewinska. She won gold in ball and ribbon finals, and silver medals with hoop and clubs. In April, she competed at World Cup Sofia and took 28th place in the all-around. On 25–27 April, she competed at the World Cup Tashkent, where she took 23rd place in the all-around. In June, she was selected to represent Poland at the 2025 European Championships in Tallinn, Estonia with Polish group and Liliana Lewinska. They took 7th place in team competition. Emilia placed 15th in all-around final. She competed at Milan World Cup and placed 10th in ribbon, almost qualifying to apparatus final. On July 25–27, she competed at the Cluj-Napoca World Challenge Cup and finished 18th in the all-around. In August, she represented Poland alongside Liliana Lewinska at the 2025 World Championships in Rio de Janeiro, Brazil. She took 28th place in all-around qualifications, improving her success from 2023.

In 2026, Emilia started the season competing at Tartu Grand Prix, where she took 8th place in all-around and 6th place in ribbon. In March, she won silver medal in all-around behind Liliana Lewińska at Polish National Championships. She also won gold in hoop, bronze in team, ball, clubs and ribbon. In May, she won bronze medal in all-around at Gdynia Rhythmic Stars. She also won gold medals in hoop, clubs and ribbon. In the end of May, she represented Poland alongside Liliana Lewińska at the 2026 European Championships in Varna, Bulgaria. Together with senior group they took 8th place in team competition. She was 15th in all-around final. In August, she was selected to represent Poland at the 2026 World Championships in Frankfurt, Germany, alongside Liliana Lewinska and senior group. They took 14th place in team competition. She ended on 29th place in all-around qualifications, without advancing into the final. She was most successful with clubs (16th place).

== Routine music information ==
Year	Apparatus	Music title
2026	Hoop	We Found Love (Rihanna Cover) by 2WEI, Ali Christenhusz, Tiffany Aris
2026	Ball	HPE116_02_1 I SEE RED_INSTRUMENTAL-14115 by EXTREME MUSIC, PRS
2026	Clubs	
2026	Ribbon	Spice Up Your Life by Spice Girls
2025	Hoop	We Found Love (Rihanna Cover) by 2WEI, Ali Christenhusz, Tiffany Aris
2025	Ball	Don't Speak by Postmodern Jukebox
2025	Clubs	Mara by The Haxan Cloak / Gods Awaken by Filip Lackovic
2025	Ribbon	Spice Up Your Life by Spice Girls
2024	Hoop	Great Balls Of Fire by Jerry Lee Lewis
2024	Ball	Vogue by Madonna
2024	Clubs	Mara by The Haxan Cloak / Gods Awaken by Filip Lackovic
2024	Ribbon	Smooth Criminal (Michael Jackson Cover) by Aubrey Logan
