= 2023 Rhythmic Gymnastics European Championships =

- Venue: National Gymnastics Arena
- Location: Baku, Azerbaijan
- Start date: 17 May 2023
- End date: 21 May 2023

The 2023 Rhythmic Gymnastics European Championships was the 39th edition of the Rhythmic Gymnastics European Championships, it took place on 17–21 May 2023 at the National Gymnastics Arena in Baku, Azerbaijan.

== Participating countries ==
- Andorra
- Austria
- Azerbaijan
- Belgium
- Bosnia and Herzegovina
- Bulgaria
- Croatia
- Cyprus
- Czech Republic
- Spain
- Estonia
- Finland
- France
- Great Britain
- Georgia
- Germany
- Greece
- Hungary
- Israel
- Italy
- Latvia
- Lithuania
- Luxembourg
- Moldova
- Montenegro
- Netherlands
- Norway
- Poland
- Portugal
- Romania
- Slovenia
- San Marino
- Serbia
- Switzerland
- Slovakia
- Sweden
- Turkey
- Ukraine

Updated on 5 April 2023

== Competition schedule ==
- Wednesday 17 May
  - 12:00 – 13:20 Junior groups qualification & AA ranking (5 Ropes & 5 Balls), Set A
  - 13:30 – 14:50 Junior groups qualification & AA ranking (5 Ropes & 5 Balls), Set B
  - 17:25 – 17:55 Opening Ceremony
  - 18:10 – 18:50 Junior groups 5 Ropes Final
  - 19:10 – 19:50 Junior groups 5 Balls Final
  - 20:00 – 20:15 Award ceremony Junior Groups – All-Around & Apparatus final
- Thursday 18 May
  - 10:00 – 12:00 Set A Senior Individuals qualifications (hoop & ball)
  - 12:15 – 14:15 Set B Senior Individuals qualifications (hoop & ball)
  - 15:45 – 17:45 Set C Senior Individuals qualifications (hoop & ball)
  - 18:00 – 20:00 Set D Senior Individuals qualifications (hoop & ball)
- Friday 19 May
  - 10:00 – 12:00 Set C Senior Individuals qualifications (clubs & ribbon)
  - 12:15 – 14:15 Set D Senior Individuals qualifications (clubs & ribbon)
  - 15:45 – 17:45 Set A Senior Individuals qualifications (clubs & ribbon)
  - 18:00 – 20:00 Set B Senior Individuals qualifications (clubs & ribbon)
- Saturday 20 May
  - 12:00 – 14:00 Senior Individuals AA Final (hoop, ball, clubs, ribbon – SET A)
  - 15:40 – 17:40 Senior Individuals AA Final (hoop, ball, clubs, ribbon – SET B)
  - 17:45 – 18:00 Award Ceremony AA Seniors Individuals
  - 18:15 – 19:45 Senior Groups (5 hoops and 3 ribbons & 2 balls – SET A)
  - 20:00 – 21:30 Senior Groups (5 hoops and 3 ribbons & 2 balls – SET B)
  - 21:40 – 22:10 Award Ceremony AA Senior Groups & Team (Senior Individuals and Senior Groups)
- Sunday 21 May
  - 12:10 – 13:15 Senior Individuals Hoop & Ball Finals
  - 13:25 – 14:30 Senior Individuals Clubs & Ribbon Finals
  - 14:35 – 15:00 Award Ceremony Senior Individual Apparatus finals
  - 16:30 – 17:10 Senior Groups 5 Hoops Final
  - 17:30 – 18:10 Senior Groups 3 ribbons & 2 balls Final
  - 18:20 – 18:40 Award Ceremony Senior Groups Apparatus finals

== Medal winners ==
Event	Gold	Silver	Bronze
Team
Team	Bulgaria; Senior Individual; Boryana Kaleyn; Stiliana Nikolova; Eva Brezalieva; Senior Group; Sofia Ivanova; Kamelia Petrova; Rachel Stoyanov; Radina Tomova; Zhenina Trashlieva	Ukraine; Senior Individual; Viktoriia Onopriienko; Polina Karika; Polina Horodnycha; Senior Group; Yelyzaveta Azza; Diana Baieva; Daryna Duda; Yeva Meleshchuk; Anastasiya Voznyak; Mariia Vysochanska	Israel; Senior Individual; Adi Asya Katz; Daniela Munits; Senior Group; Shani Bakanov; Eliza Banchuk; Adar Friedmann; Romi Paritzki; Ofir Shaham; Diana Svertsov
Senior Individual Finals
All-Around	Boryana Kaleyn; Bulgaria	Sofia Raffaeli; Italy	Stiliana Nikolova; Bulgaria
Hoop	Viktoriia Onopriienko; Ukraine	Adi Asya Katz; Israel	Boryana Kaleyn; Bulgaria
Ball	Sofia Raffaeli; Italy	Stiliana Nikolova; Bulgaria	Zohra Aghamirova; Azerbaijan
Clubs	Sofia Raffaeli; Italy	Boryana Kaleyn; Bulgaria	Ekaterina Vedeneeva; Slovenia
Ribbon	Darja Varfolomeev; Germany	Eva Brezalieva; Bulgaria	Stiliana Nikolova; Bulgaria
Senior Group Finals
All-Around	Bulgaria; Sofia Ivanova; Kamelia Petrova; Rachel Stoyanov; Radina Tomova; Zhenina Trashlieva	Israel; Shani Bakanov; Eliza Banchuk; Adar Friedmann; Romi Paritzki; Ofir Shaham; Diana Svertsov	Azerbaijan; Gullu Aghalarzade; Laman Alimuradova; Kamilla Aliyeva; Zeynab Hummatova; Yelyzaveta Luzan; Darya Sorokina
5 Hoops	Israel; Shani Bakanov; Eliza Banchuk*; Adar Friedmann; Romi Paritzki; Ofir Shaham; Diana Svertsov	Bulgaria; Sofia Ivanova; Kamelia Petrova; Rachel Stoyanov; Radina Tomova; Zhenina Trashlieva	Italy; Martina Centofanti; Agnese Duranti; Alessia Maurelli; Daniela Mogurean; Laura Paris; Alessia Russo*
3 Ribbons + 2 Balls	Azerbaijan; Gullu Aghalarzade*; Laman Alimuradova; Kamilla Aliyeva; Zeynab Hummatova; Yelyzaveta Luzan; Darya Sorokina	Israel; Shani Bakanov; Eliza Banchuk; Adar Friedmann*; Romi Paritzki; Ofir Shaham; Diana Svertsov	Spain; Ana Arnau; Inés Bergua; Mireia Martínez; Patricia Pérez; Salma Solaun
Junior Group Finals
All-Around	Israel; Shelly Elguy; Elinor Gerts; Kseniya Kulyk; Yuval Schulman; Anat Shnaider; Meital Maayam Sumkin	Bulgaria; Eva Emilova; Vanesa Emilova; Andrea Ivanova; Krasimira Ivanova; Gabriela Peeva; Tsveteyoana Peycheva	Azerbaijan; Madina Aslanova; Ilaha Bahadirova; Govhar Ibrahimova; Sakinakhanim Ismayilzada; Zahra Jafarova; Ayan Sadigova
5 Balls	Bulgaria; Eva Emilova; Vanesa Emilova; Andrea Ivanova; Krasimira Ivanova; Gabriela Peeva*; Tsveteyoana Peycheva	Israel; Shelly Elguy; Elinor Gerts; Kseniya Kulyk; Yuval Schulman*; Anat Shnaider; Meital Maayam Sumkin	Azerbaijan; Madina Aslanova*; Ilaha Bahadirova; Govhar Ibrahimova; Sakinakhanim Ismayilzada; Zahra Jafarova; Ayan Sadigova
5 Ropes	Bulgaria; Eva Emilova; Vanesa Emilova*; Andrea Ivanova; Krasimira Ivanova; Gabriela Peeva; Tsveteyoana Peycheva	Israel; Shelly Elguy; Elinor Gerts; Kseniya Kulyk*; Yuval Schulman; Anat Shnaider; Meital Maayam Sumkin	Italy; Virginia Cuttini; Gaia D'Antona; Elisa Dobrovolska*; Caterina Maltoni; Cristina Ventura; Bianka Vignozzi

* reserve gymnast

== Results ==
=== Team ===
Rank	Nation	Hoop (rhythmic gymnastics)	Ball (rhythmic gymnastics)	Clubs (rhythmic gymnastics)	Ribbon (rhythmic gymnastics)	5	3, 2	Total
1st place, gold medalist(s)	Bulgaria	66.300	67.850	60.900	61.400	35.600	32.450	324.500
2nd place, silver medalist(s)	Ukraine	64.150	61.750	60.050	61.750	34.900	29.200	311.800
3rd place, bronze medalist(s)	Israel	62.150	61.200	57.850	61.700	35.600	31.700	310.200
4	Italy	61.950	63.200	60.600	56.250	34.150	29.000	305.150
5	Germany	61.950	64.050	60.800	60.350	30.850	26.050	304.050
6	Spain	63.400	61.250	57.500	58.600	34.350	28.750	303.850
7	Azerbaijan	56.050	59.850	56.300	53.300	32.900	32.500	290.900
8	Hungary	58.550	61.600	56.300	56.700	30.750	26.100	290.000
9	Greece	56.350	59.050	55.700	57.100	31.300	29.400	288.900
10	France	56.050	60.900	56.400	52.300	33.600	28.950	288.200
11	Romania	55.450	58.450	55.500	59.200	22.000	22.650	273.250
12	Estonia	54.700	57.100	51.750	43.650	29.650	26.500	263.350
13	Georgia	54.200	55.300	51.400	51.600	25.150	22.800	260.450
14	Finland	58.700	55.900	51.550	49.000	27.150	18.000	260.300
15	Portugal	52.050	53.050	46.800	54.800	27.700	17.250	251.650
16	Turkey	52.650	51.950	48.250	45.800	29.300	19.900	247.850
17	Czech Republic	50.350	53.150	47.350	41.500	26.950	20.250	239.550

=== Senior Individual ===
==== All-Around ====
Rank	Gymnast	Nation	Hoop (rhythmic gymnastics)	Ball (rhythmic gymnastics)	Clubs (rhythmic gymnastics)	Ribbon (rhythmic gymnastics)	Total
1st place, gold medalist(s)	Boryana Kaleyn	Bulgaria	33.250 (4)	33.100 (3)	32.900 (1)	31.750 (2)	131.000
2nd place, silver medalist(s)	Sofia Raffaeli	Italy	33.800 (2)	31.900 (4)	32.350 (2)	31.500 (4)	129.550
3rd place, bronze medalist(s)	Stiliana Nikolova	Bulgaria	34.700 (1)	34.750 (1)	32.300 (3)	27.750 (15)	129.500
4	Darja Varfolomeev	Germany	31.150 (10)	33.550 (2)	32.250 (4)	32.100 (1)	129.050
5	Polina Karika	Ukraine	31.450 (9)	31.450 (5)	30.650 (8)	30.250 (5)	123.800
6	Ekaterina Vedeneeva	Slovenia	30.650	30.650 (7)	31.250 (6)	30.150 (7)	122.700
7	Zohra Aghamirova	Azerbaijan	29.650	31.300 (6)	31.650 (5)	29.800 (8)	122.400
8	Polina Berezina	Spain	32.300 (6)	30.300	30.000	28.800	121.400
9	Margarita Kolosov	Germany	31.950 (7)	30.450 (10)	30.300	28.450	121.150
10	Adi Asya Katz	Israel	33.500 (3)	28.950	30.450 (10)	27.150	120.050
11	Panagiota Lytra	Greece	29.450	29.600	30.850 (7)	28.900 (10)	118.800
12	Alexandra Agiurgiuculese	Italy	30.300	30.500 (9)	30.550 (9)	27.400	118.750
13	Annaliese Dragan	Romania	30.550	29.500	28.800	29.300 (9)	118.150
14	Viktoriia Onopriienko	Ukraine	32.850 (5)	26.650	26.700	31.750 (2)	117.950
15	Daniela Munits	Israel	31.700 (8)	30.650 (8)	27.450	28.050	117.850
16	Fanni Pigniczki	Hungary	30.850	29.850	27.350	27.550	115.600
17	Alba Bautista	Spain	27.200	29.350	26.550	30.250 (6)	113.350
18	Maelle Millet	France	29.900	27.150	29.450	26.550	113.050
19	Hanna Panna Wiesner	Hungary	25.500	28.300	28.900	28.350	111.050
20	Emilia Heichel	Poland	29.650	25.350	27.850	26.600	109.450
21	Andreea Verdes	Romania	28.400	27.500	27.900	25.550	109.350
22	Emmi Piiroinen	Finland	29.000	28.600	26.950	23.900	108.450
23	Ester Kreitsman	Estonia	29.000	27.800	28.100	23.500	108.400
24	Hélène Karbanov	France	29.100	25.850	26.600	26.650	108.200

==== Hoop ====
Rank	Gymnast	Nation	D Score	A Score	E Score	Pen.	Total
1st place, gold medalist(s)	Viktoriia Onopriienko	Ukraine	16.900	8.050	8.300	0.000	33.250
2nd place, silver medalist(s)	Adi Asya Katz	Israel	17.000	8.050	7.900	0.350	32.600
3rd place, bronze medalist(s)	Boryana Kaleyn	Bulgaria	16.400	7.900	8.000	0.050	32.250
4	Sofia Raffaeli	Italy	16.200	8.100	7.750	0.000	32.050
5	Fanni Pigniczki	Hungary	15.900	8.150	7.700	0.050	31.700
6	Zohra Aghamirova	Azerbaijan	15.100	7.950	8.050	0.000	31.100
7	Stiliana Nikolova	Bulgaria	14.200	7.750	7.050	0.300	28.700
8	Polina Berezina	Spain	15.000	7.400	6.850	0.600	28.650

==== Ball ====
Rank	Gymnast	Nation	D Score	A Score	E Score	Pen.	Total
1st place, gold medalist(s)	Sofia Raffaeli	Italy	17.000	8.400	8.250	0.000	33.650
2nd place, silver medalist(s)	Stiliana Nikolova	Bulgaria	17.200	8.200	7.950	0.000	33.350
3rd place, bronze medalist(s)	Zohra Aghamirova	Azerbaijan	16.600	8.250	8.000	0.000	32.850
4	Viktoriia Onopriienko	Ukraine	16.700	8.000	8.000	0.000	32.700
5	Darja Varfolomeev	Germany	16.400	8.100	8.150	0.000	32.650
6	Boryana Kaleyn	Bulgaria	16.400	8.250	8.000	0.050	32.600
7	Fanni Pigniczki	Hungary	15.800	7.900	7.700	0.000	31.400
8	Panagiota Lytra	Greece	15.100	8.000	7.850	0.000	30.950

==== Clubs ====
Rank	Gymnast	Nation	D Score	A Score	E Score	Pen.	Total
1st place, gold medalist(s)	Sofia Raffaeli	Italy	16.600	8.250	8.150	0.000	33.000
2nd place, silver medalist(s)	Boryana Kaleyn	Bulgaria	16.200	8.400	8.050	0.000	32.650
3rd place, bronze medalist(s)	Ekaterina Vedeneeva	Slovenia	15.400	8.000	8.300	0.000	31.700
4	Viktoriia Onopriienko	Ukraine	15.600	7.850	8.250	0.050	31.650
5	Darja Varfolomeev	Germany	15.900	7.800	7.650	0.000	31.350
6	Panagiota Lytra	Greece	15.400	7.850	7.900	0.050	31.100
7	Zohra Aghamirova	Azerbaijan	14.000	7.800	7.950	0.000	29.750
8	Alexandra Agiurgiuculese	Italy	13.100	7.250	6.100	0.050	26.400

==== Ribbon ====
Rank	Gymnast	Nation	D Score	A Score	E Score	Pen.	Total
1st place, gold medalist(s)	Darja Varfolomeev	Germany	15.700	8.250	8.300	0.000	32.250
2nd place, silver medalist(s)	Eva Brezalieva	Bulgaria	15.600	8.200	7.800	0.000	31.600
3rd place, bronze medalist(s)	Stiliana Nikolova	Bulgaria	15.000	8.450	8.100	0.000	31.550
4	Ekaterina Vedeneeva	Slovenia	14.300	8.100	8.300	0.000	30.700
5	Milena Baldassarri	Italy	14.200	7.950	7.300	0.000	29.450
6	Viktoriia Onopriienko	Ukraine	13.400	8.100	7.500	0.000	29.000
7	Adi Asya Katz	Israel	12.800	8.100	7.800	0.000	28.700
8	Daniela Munits	Israel	13.900	7.700	7.050	0.000	28.650

=== Senior Group ===
==== All-Around ====
Rank	Nation	5	3, 2	Total
1st place, gold medalist(s)	Bulgaria	35.600	32.450	68.050
2nd place, silver medalist(s)	Israel	35.600	31.700	67.300
3rd place, bronze medalist(s)	Azerbaijan	32.900	32.500	65.400
4	Ukraine	34.900	29.200	64.100
5	Italy	34.150	29.000	63.150
6	Spain	34.350	28.750	63.100
7	France	33.600	28.950	62.550
8	Greece	31.300	29.400	60.700
9	Poland	33.350	26.400	59.750
10	Germany	30.850	26.050	56.900
11	Hungary	30.750	26.100	56.850
12	Estonia	29.650	26.500	56.150
13	Turkey	29.300	19.900	49.200
14	Georgia	25.150	22.800	47.950
15	Czech Republic	26.950	20.250	47.200
16	Finland	27.150	18.000	45.150
17	Portugal	27.700	17.250	44.950
18	Romania	22.000	22.650	44.650

==== 5 Hoops ====
Rank	Nation	D Score	A Score	E Score	Pen.	Total
1st place, gold medalist(s)	Israel	19.500	8.500	7.800	0.000	35.800
2nd place, silver medalist(s)	Bulgaria	19.100	8.550	7.600	0.000	35.250
3rd place, bronze medalist(s)	Italy	19.000	8.400	7.550	0.000	34.950
4	Spain	19.300	8.050	7.250	0.000	34.600
5	Poland	19.100	8.000	6.900	0.000	34.000
6	Ukraine	18.200	8.200	7.450	0.000	33.850
7	France	18.300	7.950	7.150	0.300	33.100
8	Azerbaijan	18.300	8.200	6.300	0.000	32.800

==== 3 Ribbons + 2 Balls ====
Rank	Nation	D Score	A Score	E Score	Pen.	Total
1st place, gold medalist(s)	Azerbaijan	16.800	8.200	7.250	0.000	32.250
2nd place, silver medalist(s)	Israel	16.500	8.200	7.450	0.000	32.150
3rd place, bronze medalist(s)	Spain	16.500	7.700	7.000	0.000	31.200
4	Ukraine	15.900	7.850	6.700	0.000	30.450
5	Bulgaria	15.100	7.900	6.000	0.000	29.000
6	Italy	14.900	7.800	6.250	0.000	28.950
7	Greece	14.700	7.600	6.450	0.000	28.750
8	France	14.300	7.400	6.100	0.000	27.800

=== Junior Group ===
==== All-Around ====
Rank	Nation	5	5	Total
1st place, gold medalist(s)	Israel	31.100	30.500	61.600
2nd place, silver medalist(s)	Bulgaria	28.800	30.450	59.250
3rd place, bronze medalist(s)	Azerbaijan	29.000	29.450	58.450
4	Ukraine	30.000	28.250	58.250
5	Germany	26.850	27.850	54.700
6	Poland	27.900	25.950	53.850
7	Greece	26.550	27.050	53.600
8	Spain	27.800	24.900	53.600
9	Hungary	23.350	26.650	50.000
10	Lithuania	25.950	23.450	49.400
11	Romania	22.250	25.900	48.150
12	Slovakia	25.050	22.900	47.950
13	Estonia	24.200	23.200	47.400
14	Slovenia	24.050	23.250	47.300
15	Georgia	24.900	20.300	45.200
16	Finland	25.300	19.800	45.100
17	Czech Republic	21.800	19.350	41.150
18	Andorra	19.200	20.450	39.650
19	Great Britain	20.500	19.000	39.500
20	Portugal	16.050	21.250	37.300
DSQ	Italy	DNS	28.650	DNF

==== 5 Balls ====
Rank	Nation	D Score	E Score	A Score	Pen.	Total
1st place, gold medalist(s)	Bulgaria	15.600	8.200	8.300	0.000	32.100
2nd place, silver medalist(s)	Israel	15.400	8.050	8.450	0.000	31.900
3rd place, bronze medalist(s)	Azerbaijan	15.100	8.000	8.100	0.000	31.200
4	Ukraine	14.400	7.750	8.200	0.000	30.350
5	Spain	12.700	6.950	8.000	0.000	27.650
6	Greece	13.000	6.650	7.300	0.600	26.350
7	Poland	11.400	6.450	7.300	0.000	25.150
8	Germany	10.900	5.900	7.350	0.600	23.550

==== 5 Ropes ====
Rank	Nation	D Score	E Score	A Score	Pen.	Total
1st place, gold medalist(s)	Bulgaria	14.600	7.600	8.300	0.000	30.500
2nd place, silver medalist(s)	Israel	15.100	7.400	8.200	0.300	30.400
3rd place, bronze medalist(s)	Italy	14.500	7.300	7.750	0.000	29.550
4	Azerbaijan	13.800	7.100	7.600	0.000	28.500
5	Germany	13.600	6.800	7.550	0.000	27.950
6	Greece	12.800	6.800	7.450	0.000	27.050
7	Ukraine	12.000	6.800	7.150	0.300	25.650
8	Hungary	12.100	6.050	6.950	0.300	24.800

== Medal count ==
* Host nation (Azerbaijan)

Rank	Nation	Gold	Silver	Bronze	Total
1	Bulgaria	5	5	3	13
2	Israel	2	5	1	8
3	Italy	2	1	2	5
4	Ukraine	1	1	0	2
5	Azerbaijan*	1	0	4	5
6	Germany	1	0	0	1
7	Slovenia	0	0	1	1
7	Spain	0	0	1	1
Totals (8 entries)		12	12	12	36
