= Boyanka Angelova =

Bulgarian gymnast (born 1994)

- Born: October 28, 1994 (age 31) Sofia, Bulgaria

Gymnastics career
- Discipline: Rhythmic gymnastics
- Country represented: Bulgaria
- Retired: yes
Medal record
Junior European Championships
Silver medal – second place	2008 Torino	Ball

Boyanka Angelova (Bulgarian: Боянка Ангелова; born October 28, 1994) is a Bulgarian retired rhythmic gymnast. She was known for her complex and difficult routines.

She has mistakenly been identified as the granddaughter of Nadia Comăneci, the first gymnast to receive a perfect 10, in a viral video.

== Career ==
Angelova was a member of the CSKA sports club in Sofia. She began gymnastics in kindergarten, and she was noticed by her first coach for her flexibility and ability to advance quickly.

In September 2007, Angelova was ranked first in the junior all-around at the "Queen Margarita" international tournament in Varna.

In March 2008, she won bronze medals with the ribbon and the hoop in the junior competition at the Grand Prix stage in Moscow. That June, she came second to Russia's Yana Lukonina for her performance in the ball final at the Junior European Championships in Turin.

In 2010, she was appointed to the Bulgarian senior women's team as a central member. However, she never competed as a senior. She instead retired due to back injuries; a piece of bone broke off one of her vertebrae. Iliana Raeva, the head of the Bulgarian Rhythmic Gymnastics Federation, blamed her coaches for not training her with her long-term health in mind, saying that she was over-trained and practicing too complex routines from a young age.

In May 2013, a video of her 2008 Junior European ball performance went viral, garnering more than 7 million views. The wave of attention years after her routine and retirement upset Angelova.

After halting her gymnastics career, she became interested in studying forensic medicine.
