= Elvira Krasnobaeva =

Russian-Bulgarian rhythmic gymnast (born 2008)

- Елвира Краснобаева
- Born: 10 March 2008 (age 18) Saint-Petersburg, Russia

Gymnastics career
- Discipline: Rhythmic gymnastics
- Country represented: (2021-2024)
- Former countries represented: Bulgaria
- Club: Gracia Club
- Head coach: Elena Borisovna
- Assistant coach: Svetlana Misheva
- Choreographer: Svetlana Tonsheva
- Retired: yes
Medal record
Rhythmic Gymnastics
Representing Bulgaria
Event	1st	2nd	3rd
European Championships	1	0	1
FIG World Cup	2	4	0
Grand Prix Series	3	3	2
Junior European Championships	1	1	1
Junior World Championships	2	0	0
Total	9	8	4
European Championships
Gold medal – first place	2024 Budapest	Team
Bronze medal – third place	2024 Budapest	Ribbon
Grand Prix Final
Gold medal – first place	2024 Brno	All-around
Gold medal – first place	2024 Brno	Ball
Gold medal – first place	2024 Brno	Ribbon
Silver medal – second place	2024 Brno	Clubs
Bronze medal – third place	2024 Brno	Hoop
Junior World Championships
Gold medal – first place	2023 Cluj-Napoca	Team
Gold medal – first place	2023 Cluj-Napoca	Ball
Junior European Championships
Gold medal – first place	2022 Tel Aviv	Hoop
Silver medal – second place	2022 Tel Aviv	Ball
Bronze medal – third place	2022 Tel Aviv	Team

Elvira Krasnobaeva (Bulgarian: Елвира Краснобаева; born 10 March 2008) is a retired rhythmic gymnast who formerly competed for Bulgaria. She is the 2024 European bronze medalist with ribbon and team champion, the 2022 junior European hoop champion and 2023 junior World ball champion.

At the Bulgarian national level, she is the 2024 Senior all-around silver medalist. She is also the 2022 and 2023 Junior national champion, as well as the 2021 Junior all-around silver medalist.

== Personal life ==
Elvira Krasnobaeva was born in Saint Petersburg, Russia. At the age of six, she moved with her family to Varna, Bulgaria. There she entered the National School of Arts "Dobri Hristov" as part of the ballet department and continued to train in rhythmic gymnastics as a member of the club "Gracia". In 2021 she was given Bulgarian citizenship. Her dream was to compete at the Olympics.

== Gymnastics career ==
=== 2021 ===
In 2021 Krasnobaeva was included in the Bulgarian national team ahead of the junior European and World Championships. She then went on to became the national junior silver medalist behind Nikol Todorova and ahead of Victoria Georgieva. She was the silver medalist at the Julieta Shismanova tournament in Burgas.

=== 2022 ===
Krasnobaeva won the first two junior-level internal competitions of 2022. In March she competed at the Aphrodite Cup in Greece, where she was eighth with clubs. At the Andalusia Cup in Spain, she won gold in all-around, gold with ball and ribbon, and bronze with clubs. She next won the all-around silver in the junior portion of the Sofia Cup. In late April, she won the bronze medal in the all-around at Irina Deleanu Cup.

She won the junior national title in May. In June, she was selected to represent Bulgaria, along with Dara Stoyanova, at the 2022 European Championships in Tel Aviv, where she won bronze in team, silver with ball and gold with hoop.

=== 2023 ===
Krasnobaeva started the 2023 season at the Miss Valentine Tournament in Tartu, along with teammates Nikol Todorova, Dara Stoyanova and Dara Malinova. In the junior team event, she won silver with the rest of the Bulgarian team behind Ukraine and above Kazakhstan. She also qualified for the hoop and ball finals, winning gold in both. At the second Junior World Championships, Krasnobaeva won two gold medals. One was in the team competition, where she contributed to the team score along with the Bulgarian group and Nikol Todorova. She also won an individual gold in the ball final.

=== 2024 ===
In 2024, she made her senior debut at Miss Valentine, winning silver in the all-around, silver in the hoop final and bronze in the ribbon final. On March 23, she won gold in the all-around at her first World Cup in Athens. In the apparatus finals, she won gold with hoop, and silver with clubs and ribbon. At her next World Cup in Baku, she won the silver medal in the all-around and was one of only two gymnasts (along with Darja Varfolomeev) to qualify for every event final. She won another silver in the ribbon final.

In early May, she won the silver all-around medal at the Bulgarian national championships behind Stiliana Nikolova. Later that month, she competed at the 2024 European Championships with her teammates Nikolova and Boryana Kaleyn, with whom she won the gold medal in the Team event. She took 7th place in the clubs final and won the bronze medal in the ribbon final. On June 15–16, she competed at the Brno Grand Prix in the Czech Republic and won gold in the all-around, ribbon and ball as well as silver with clubs and bronze with hoop.

In October, Krasnobaeva announced that she would no longer compete for Bulgaria. The Bulgarian Rhythmic Gymnastics Federation ruled that she would be required to pay compensation due to breaking her contract with them. Krasnobaeva said that she would be representing Armenia in the future and that she was changing countries because her family was moving to Russia and she needed to represent a country that would allow her to train there.

Less than two months later, the Armenian federation said they were no longer working with her, citing disrespectful behavior toward the coaches in training, and claimed they had not been repaid the money invested in her training. Her mother disputed how much the federation had provided and said that the coaches had unreasonably high demands of Krasnobaeva given that she had not trained for several months. The International Gymnastics Federation has not yet approved her change of nationality.

In December, Krasnobaeva returned to training at her first club, "Zhemchuzhina" St. Petersburg, where she began gymnastics as a child. She represented the club when she took part in a gala show, "Sky Grace", organized by Olympic champion Alina Kabaeva, which was her first appearance performing gymnastics since leaving Bulgaria. Irina Zenovka choreographed her new routines for 2025.

=== 2025 ===
On March 4 2025, she competed in the "Grand Prix Alina Kabaeva Champions Cup" tournament in Moscow representing Sky Grace, where she placed 17th overall.

=== 2026 ===
Krasnobaeva announced her retirement on June 15, 2026.

== Routine music information ==
Year	Apparatus	Music Title
2025	Hoop	The Show Must Go On (Remastered 2011) by Queen
2025	Ball	Mascagni by Andrea Bocelli & Celso Valli
2025	Clubs	Adiemus by Miriam Stockley
2025	Ribbon	Earth Song by Michael Jackson
2024	Hoop	Turandot, Act III: Nessun dorma by Luciano Pavarotti John Alldis Choir, Wandsworth School Boys Choir, London Philharmonic Orchestra & Zubin Mehta
2024	Ball	Thought I'd Ring You by Alain Delon & Shirley Bassey
2024	Clubs	Buleria by David Bisbal
2024	Ribbon	Who Wants to Live Forever (feat. Lindsey Stirling) by The Tenors
2023	Hoop	Dance of the Sugar Plum Fairy by Lindsey Stirling
2023	Ball	Exercise in Free Love (New Orchestrated Version) by Freddie Mercury & Montserrat Caballe
2023	Clubs	Shape Of You Indian Mix (New Age Carnatic) by IndianRaga & Aditya Rao
2023	Ribbon	El Mar Y Tu by Andrea Bocelli, Dulce Pontes
2022	Hoop	Dance of the Sugar Plum Fairy by Lindsey Stirling
2022	Ball	Exercise in Free Love (New Orchestrated Version) by Freddie Mercury & Montserrat Caballe
2022	Clubs	Palestine Pursuit by Greg J Walker
2022	Ribbon	El Mar Y Tu by Andrea Bocelli, Dulce Pontes
2021	Hoop	"Tristan & Iseult", by Maxime Rodriguez
2021	Ball	Chopin Nocturne by David Garrett feat David Foster
2021	Clubs	We Will Rock You by Queen
2021	Ribbon	Les Temps des Cathédrales by Josh Groban

== Competitive highlights ==
(Team competitions in seniors are held only at the World Championships, Europeans and other Continental Games.)

International: Senior
Year	Event	AA	Team	Hoop	Ball	Clubs	Ribbon
2024	World Cup Milan	17th		5th	15th (Q)	27th (Q)	26th (Q)
2024	Grand Prix Final: Brno	1st		3rd	1st	2nd	1st
2024	European Championships		1st			7th	3rd
2024	World Cup Baku	2nd		7th	5th	4th	2nd
2024	World Cup Athens	1st		1st		2nd	2nd
2024	Grand Prix Tartu	2nd		2nd	8th (Q)	6th	3rd
International: Junior
Year	Event	AA	Team	Hoop	Ball	Clubs	Ribbon
2023	Junior World Championships		1st	4th	1st	15th (Q)	
2022	Junior European Championships		3rd	1st	2nd		
National: Senior
Year	Event	AA	Team	Hoop	Ball	Clubs	Ribbon
2024	Bulgarian Championships	2nd					
National: Junior
Year	Event	AA	Team	Hoop	Ball	Clubs	Ribbon
2023	Bulgarian Junior Championships	1st					
2022	Bulgarian Junior Championships	1st					
Q = Qualifications (Did not advance to Event Final due to the 2 gymnast per country rule, only Top 8 highest score, no Event Finals held); WD = Withdrew

== See also ==
- Nationality changes in gymnastics
