= Liliana Lewińska =

Polish rhythmic gymnast

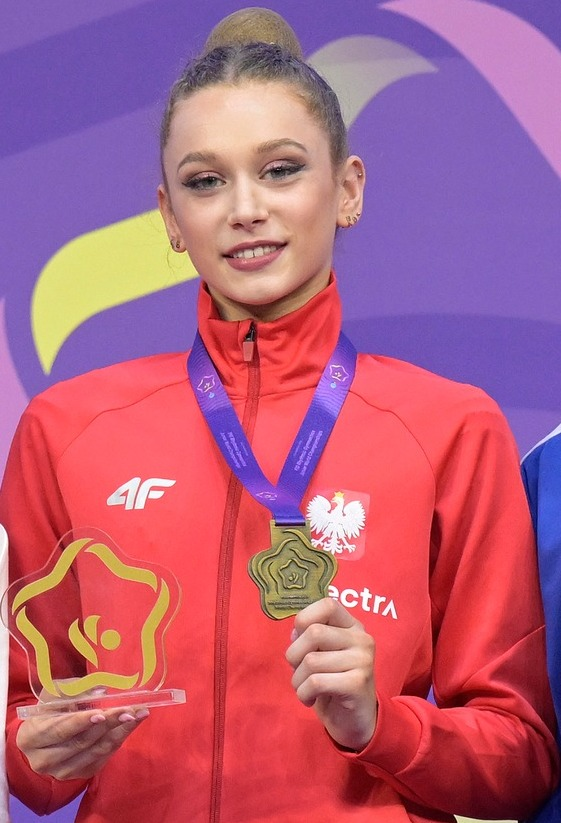
- Lewińska in 2023

Personal information
- Nicknames: Lila, Lily
- Born: 2 November 2008 (age 18) Wrocław, Poland

Gymnastics career
- Discipline: Rhythmic gymnastics
- Country represented: Poland; (2021–present)
- Club: UKS Kopernik Wrocław
- Head coach: Krystyna Leskiewicz
Medal record
Representing Poland
Rhythmic Gymnastics
Event	1st	2nd	3rd
European Championships	0	1	0
FIG World Cup	1	1	7
Grand Prix	1	1	5
Junior European Championships	0	2	1
Junior World Championships	2	0	0
Total	4	5	13
European Championships
Silver medal – second place	2024 Budapest	Clubs
Grand Prix Final
Gold medal – first place	2026 Brno	Ribbon
Bronze medal – third place	2025 Brno	Ribbon
Bronze medal – third place	2026 Brno	All-around
Junior World Championships
Gold medal – first place	2023 Cluj-Napoca	Clubs
Gold medal – first place	2023 Cluj-Napoca	Ribbon
Junior European Championships
Silver medal – second place	2022 Tel Aviv	Hoop
Silver medal – second place	2022 Tel Aviv	Clubs
Bronze medal – third place	2022 Tel Aviv	Ribbon
- Last updated on: 2 November 2026.

Liliana Lewińska (born 2 November 2008) is a Polish rhythmic gymnast. She is the 2024 European clubs silver medalist, 2023 Junior World clubs and ribbon champion, as well as the 2022 Junior European hoop and clubs silver medalist and ribbon bronze medalist.

At the national level, she is a three-time (2024-2026) Polish all-around senior champion. She is a three-time (2021-2023) Polish junior all-around champion, and the 2021 Polish Junior team silver medalist, competing as part of her club UKS Kopernik Wrocław.

== Personal life ==
Her mother, 1996 Olympian Krystyna Leskiewicz-Lewinska, is her coach and also the head coach of the Polish rhythmic gymnastics national team, and head coach and president of the UKS Kopernik Wrocław where both Liliana and her other daughter Laura train. Her father, Rajmund, is a basketball referee and a physical education teacher. She took up the sport at age 5 as a group gymnast after being gifted a ball at the National Youth Olympics.

== Career ==
=== Junior ===
==== 2021 ====
She debuted into major competitions at the 2021 international tournament in Moscow in February, winning bronze in the all-around, 5th with hoop, ball, clubs and 12th with ribbon. In April, she participated in the Sofia Cup in Bulgaria, topping the all-around. In May she came second in the all-around and ball, and 3rd with clubs and topping hoop at the Irina Deleanu cup in Bucharest. In September she competed at the Gdynia Cup.

==== 2022 ====
In 2022 she returned to the Moscow Grand Prix, winning silver in all events. She won the all-around at the Gdynia Cup and also won all the apparatus finals except hoop, where she finished in second. The following week, she attended the World Challenge Cup in Portimão, getting bronze with hoop, silver with clubs and gold with ribbon. Lewińska was then selected for the 2022 European Championship in Tel Aviv, Israel. She was the only junior gymnast representing Poland in the competition. She qualified for all four event finals and won two silvers with hoop and clubs and bronze with ribbon.

==== 2023 ====
At the 2023 Fellbach-Schmiden's international tournament, she didn't compete in the team competition but won silver with hoop and ribbon as well as gold with clubs. In March she won gold in the all-around at the Aphrodite Cup in the category for those born in 2008 and silver with ball. At the IT Sofia Cup, she won silver in the all-around as well as with hoop. In May she won gold in teams, the all-around and with ball and clubs at the Gdynia Cup. Additionally, she won a silver with ribbon and bronze with hoop. In July she competed at the Junior World Championships in Cluj-Napoca alongside the junior national group, where she made history by winning gold in the clubs and ribbon finals.

=== Senior ===
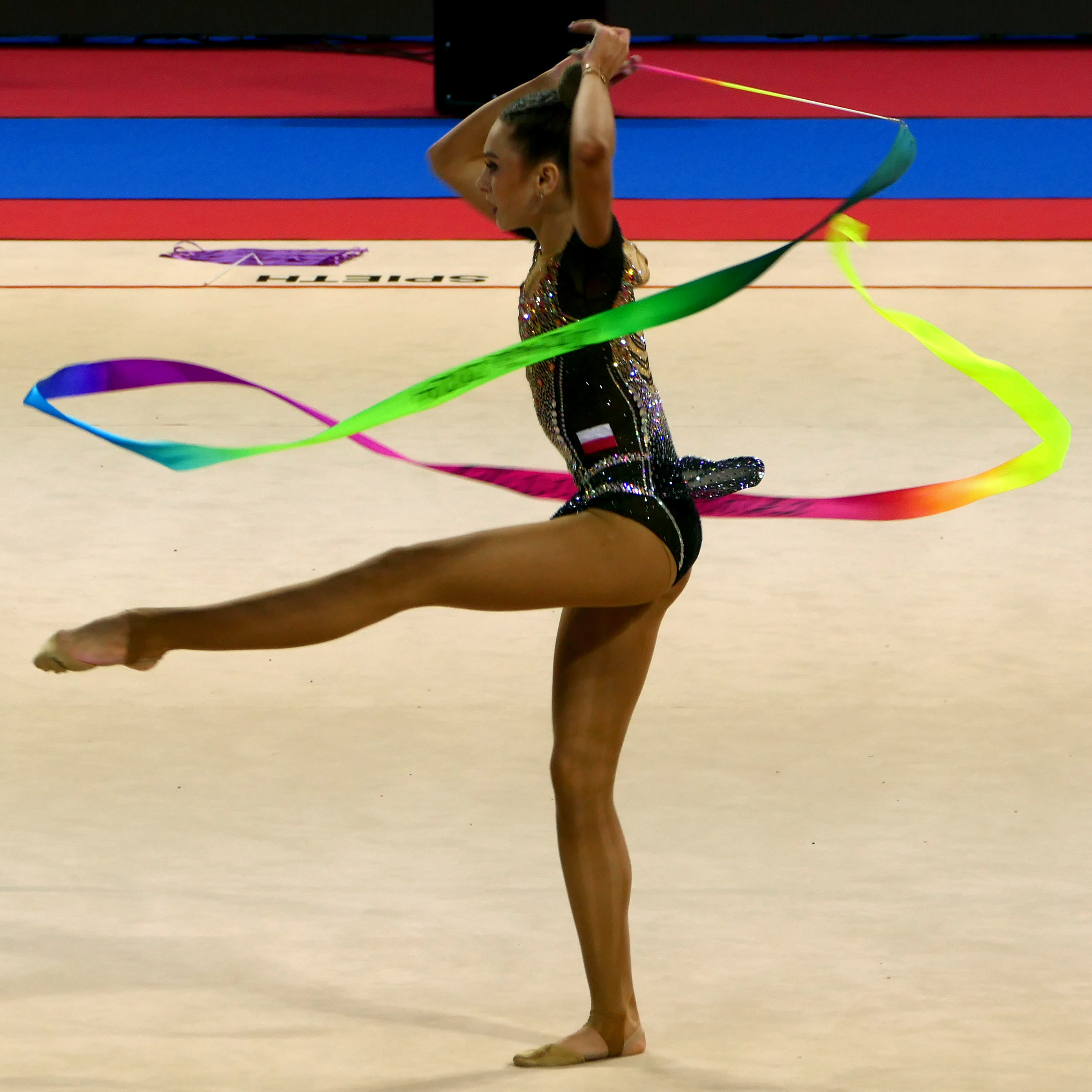
Lewińska competing in the ribbon final at the 2024 Sofia World Cup

==== 2024 ====
In 2024, she made her senior debut at World Cup Palaio Faliro, Greece, where she ended in 11th place in the all-around and won a bronze medal in the hoop final. In April, she competed at Sofia World Cup and took 7th place in the all-around. She qualified to two apparatus finals: clubs (6th) and ribbon (5th). She won her second World Cup medal at Tashkent World Cup, a bronze in the ribbon final.

In May, Lewińska competed at the European Championships in Budapest, Hungary, where she finished 10th in the all-around final and won a silver medal in the clubs final. It was the first European medal won at the senior level by a gymnast representing Poland. The Polish team won 7th place in the team competition.

She failed to qualify to the 2024 Summer Olympics, being beaten by Vera Tugolukova, who won the quota for Cyprus. However, before the allocation of the spot was officially confirmed, the Polish Gymnastics Federation alleged that the judging was corrupt and that Lewińska's scores were lowered, preventing her from winning the Olympic berth. The supervising judge who changed Lewińska's scores was a Cypriot national. The Polish Gymnastics Federation's president announced their intention to protest the results, and they filed appeals to the International Gymnastics Federation and the Gymnastics Ethics Foundation. He later said that some of the judges at the competition had filed complaints as well. The Polish Minister of Sport, Sławomir Nitras, also intervened by sending a letter to the FIG Executive Committee.

==== 2025 ====
In February 2025, Evangelia Trikomiti, who was president of the superior jury at the 2024 European Championships, was banned from the sport for four years after the International Gymnastics Federation (FIG) ruled she had altered the scores at the competition to ensure Tugolukova finished in the Olympic qualification place.

In 2025, Lewinska began her season in late February by competing for the Italian club Polimnia Ritmica Romana during the first stage of the Italian Serie A1 club championship. She performed her new hoop routine and her team reached 9th place. In March, she won gold medal in the all-around in front of Emilia Heichel at the Polish Cup, then won the silver all-around medal at the Gymnastik International behind Anastasia Simakova. She next competed at the Grand Prix Marbella, where she took 4th place in the all-around behind Takhmina Ikromova and won the bronze medal in the hoop final. On 29-30 March, she won the all-around at the Polish National Championships. In April, she competed at World Cup Sofia and took 5th place in the all-around. She qualified to three apparatus finals; she won silver in the ribbon final, and she finished 4th in ball and 7th in clubs. On 25-27 April, she competed at World Cup Tashkent, where she won bronze in the all-around - her first World Cup all-around medal. In the finals, she took 7th place in hoop and ball and 5th place in ribbon.

In June, she was selected to represent Poland at the 2025 European Championships in Tallinn, Estonia with Polish group and Emilia Heichel. They took 7th place in team competition. Liliana placed 6th in all-around final and qualified to three apparatus finals. On July 18-20, she competed at World Cup Milan and took 11th place in all-around. She qualified to clubs final, placing 7th. On July 25-27, she competed at World Challenge Cup in Cluj-Napoca, where she ended on 6th place in all-around. She qualified to three apparatus finals, winning bronze with hoop. In August, Lewinska made her senior World Championships debut in Rio de Janeiro, Brazil. She took 17th place in all-around qualifications and qualified to one apparatus final. In all-around final, she made a big mistake in her ball routine and finished on 16th place. She was 6th in clubs final. On September 13-14, she finished on 4th place in all-around and won bronze medal with ribbon at Brno Grand Prix.

==== 2026 ====
Lewinska started her 2026 season competing at Tartu Grand Prix, taking silver medal in all-around behind Taisiia Onofriichuk, gold in clubs and bronze in ribbon final. In March, she became Polish champion in all-around, ball, clubs and ribbon. She won silver medal with hoop. A week later, she won bronze medal in all-around at Marbella Grand Prix. She placed 7th in all-around at World Cup Tashkent. In May, she won gold medal in all-around and silver medals in hoop and ribbon at Gdynia Rhythmic Stars.

In the end of May, she represented Poland alongside Emilia Heichel at the 2026 European Championships in Varna, Bulgaria. Together with senior group they took 8th place in team competition. She was 11th in all-around final. She qualified to clubs final, ending on 6th place. In June, Liliana won bronze medal in all-around at Beijing World Challenge Cup. She qualified to all apparatus finals, winning another bronze medal in clubs. Then she competed at World Challenge Cup Cluj-Napoca and took 4th place in all-around, tied in score with Takhmina Ikromova, who was better in execution and therefore won bronze medal. She won gold medal in ball final and bronze in clubs.

In August, she was selected to represent Poland at the 2026 World Championships in Frankfurt, Germany, alongside Emilia Heichel and senior group. They took 14th place in team competition. In qualifications, she made mistakes in both ball and ribbon routines, and therefore ended on 20th place in all-around, without advancing into the final. She was most successful with clubs (10th place). In September, she won bronze medal in all-around behind Taisiia Onofriichuk and Akmaral Yerekesheva at Brno Grand Prix. In October, she competed in the first stage of the Italian Serie A1 Club Championship with her club Polimnia Ritmica Romana. She competed with hoop (28.300) and her team took third place.

== Achievements ==
- First Polish rhythmic gymnast to win a medal at the European Championships.
- First Polish individual rhythmic gymnast to qualify for clubs apparatus final at the World Championships. (Joanna Mitrosz qualified for hoop and ribbon at the 2010 World Championships.)
- First Polish individual rhythmic gymnast to win a gold medal (in apparatus final) in World Cup series.

== Routine music information ==
Year	Apparatus	Music title
2026	Hoop (first)	Europa by Mónica Naranjo
2026	Hoop (second)	REGARDE ! By Monroe and Violin Phonix
2026	Ball	Berghain by Rosalía, Björk and Yves Tumor
2026	Clubs	Abracadabra by Lady Gaga
2026	Ribbon (first)	Forbidden Fruit by Tommee Profitt, Sam Tinnesz & Brooke
2026	Ribbon (second)	
2025	Hoop	Paint It Black (feat. Rånya) [Epic Trailer Version] by Hidden Citizens
2025	Ball (first)	Onward & Upward (feat. Fleurie) by Tommee Profitt
2025	Ball (second)	Esa Diva by Melody
2025	Clubs	Dance With the Dragon by Dark Sarah ft. Jp Leppäluoto
2025	Ribbon	WITCH Tarohoro by Justyna Steczkowska
2024	Hoop	Gloria Regali by Fleurie, Tommee Profitt
2024	Ball	Évidemment by La Zarra
2024	Clubs	Bring On the Men from the musical Jekyll & Hyde
2024	Ribbon	Assault soundtrack from The Athena composed by Gener8ion
2023	Hoop	O Fortuna by Carl Orff
2023	Ball	Mephisto's Lullaby Xtortion Audio
2023	Clubs (first)	Gaston by Josh Gad, Luke Evans & Ensemble
2023	Clubs (second)	Queen of Kings by Alessandra
2023	Ribbon	Assault soundtrack from The Athena composed by Gener8ion
2022	Hoop	O Fortuna by Carl Orff
2022	Ball	Życie, Kocham Cię Nad Życie by Edyta Geppert
2022	Clubs	Gaston by Josh Gad, Luke Evans & Ensemble
2022	Ribbon	No Face No Name No Number by Modern Talking
2021	Hoop	Starvation by Thomas Bergersen
2021	Ball	Theme From Love Story (Finale) by Francis Lai
2021	Clubs	Waltz No. 2 by Dmitri Shostakovich
2021	Ribbon	Dulcea Si Tandra Mea Fiara by Eugen Doga & Victoria Demici, performed by Catalina Caraus

== Competitive highlights ==
(Team competitions in seniors are held only at the World Championships, Europeans and other Continental Games.)

International: Senior
Year	Event	AA	Team	Hoop	Ball	Clubs	Ribbon
2026	Grand Prix Brno	3rd		5th	4th	4th	1st
2026	World Championships	20th (Q)		14th (Q)	29th (Q)	10th (Q)	55th (Q)
2026	World Challenge Cup Cluj-Napoca	4th		4th	1st	3rd	11th (Q)
2026	World Challenge Cup Beijing	3rd		4th	8th	3rd	5th
2026	European Championships	11th	8th	13th (Q)	10th (Q)	6th	12th (Q)
2026	IT Gdynia Rhythmic Stars	1st		2nd	5th	4th	2nd
2026	World Cup Tashkent	7th			9th (Q)	9th (Q)	9th (Q)
2026	World Cup Sofia	12th		13th (Q)	15th (Q)	14th (Q)	11th (Q)
2026	Grand Prix Marbella	3rd		4th	4th		5th
2026	Grand Prix Tartu	2nd		7th	7th	1st	3rd
2025	Grand Prix Brno	4th		6th	8th	5th	3rd
2025	World Championships	16th		25th (Q)	22nd (Q)	6th	16th (Q)
2025	World Challenge Cup Cluj-Napoca	6th		3rd	5th	5th	11th (Q)
2025	World Cup Milan	11th		13th (Q)	11th (Q)	7th	24th (Q)
2025	European Championships	6th	7th	8th	23rd (Q)	8th	7th
2025	World Cup Tashkent	3rd		7th	7th	13th (Q)	5th
2025	World Cup Sofia	5th		12th (Q)	4th	7th	2nd
2025	Grand Prix Marbella	4th		3rd	8th	4th	4th
2025	Gymnastik International Fellbach-Schmiden	2nd		2nd	2nd	1st	
2024	World Challenge Cup Cluj-Napoca	13th		14th (Q)	12th (Q)	15th (Q)	11th (Q)
2024	World Cup Milan	10th		23rd (Q)	11th (Q)	6th	9th (Q)
2024	European Championships	10th		14th (Q)	13th (Q)	2nd	9th
2024	World Cup Tashkent	6th		11th (Q)	10th (Q)	5th	3rd
2024	World Cup Sofia	7th		11th (Q)	11th (Q)	6th	5th
2024	World Cup Athens	11th		3rd			
International: Junior
Year	Event	AA	Team	Hoop	Ball	Clubs	Ribbon
2023	Junior World Championships			10th (Q)	4th	1st	1st
2023	IT Gdynia Rhythmic Stars	1st	1st	3rd	1st	1st	2nd
2023	IT AGF Trophy			2nd		1st	2nd
2023	IT Sofia Cup	2nd		2nd			
2023	Gymnastik International Fellbach-Schmiden			2nd		1st	3rd
2022|	IT Lisbon	1st		1st	1st	1st	1st
2022|	Junior European Championships			2nd	4th	2nd	3rd
2022|	IT Sofia Cup	1st		2nd	1st	1st	1st
2021	IT Aphrodite Cup	1st		2nd			1st
2021	IT Gdynia Rhythmic Stars	1st		2nd	1st	2nd	1st
National
Year	Event	AA	Team	Hoop	Ball	Clubs	Ribbon
2026	Polish National Championships	1st	1st	2nd	1st	1st	1st
2025	Polish National Championships	1st	1st	1st	2nd	1st	2nd
2024	Polish National Championships	1st	1st	1st	1st	3rd	1st
2023	Polish Junior National Championships	1st	1st	1st	1st	1st	
2022	Polish Junior National Championships	1st	1st	1st	1st	1st	1st
Q = Qualifications (Did not advance to Event Final due to the 2 gymnast per country rule, only Top 8 highest score); WR = World Record; WD = Withdrew; NT = No Team Competition; OC = Out of Competition(competed but scores not counted for qualifications/results)
