= Rhythmic Gymnastics Junior World Championships =

Rhythmic gymnastics competition

The FIG Rhythmic Gymnastics Junior World Championships, are a rhythmic gymnastics competition organized by the International Gymnastics Federation (FIG).

== History ==
The inaugural edition was held in Moscow, Russia in July 2019. Subsequent championships are then to be held biannually in odd numbered years from 2021 onwards.

In May 2020, the FIG announced that there will be no Junior World Championships in 2021 in artistic or rhythmic gymnastics. FIG's executive committee reasoned the decision was made "to avoid overloading the 2021 calendar". The next Junior Worlds were held in 2023.

To be eligible for the championships, girls must be between 14 and 15 years of age (previously between 13 and 15).

The programme of the junior worlds comprises eight disciplines, with eight sets of medals at stake.

== Editions ==
Year	Edition	Host city	Country	Events
2019	1st	Moscow	Russia	8
2023	2nd	Cluj-Napoca	Romania	8
2025	3rd	Sofia	Bulgaria	8
2027	4th	Cluj-Napoca	Romania	

== Medalists ==
=== Group All-Around ===
Group All-Around Medalists
Year	Location	Gold	Silver	Bronze
2019	Moscow, Russia	Russia	Italy	Belarus
2023	Cluj-Napoca, Romania	Bulgaria	Israel	Azerbaijan
2025	Sofia, Bulgaria	Bulgaria	Brazil	Ukraine

=== Team ===
Team Medalists
Year	Location	Gold	Silver	Bronze
2019	Moscow, Russia	Russia	Italy	Israel
2023	Cluj-Napoca, Romania	Bulgaria	Israel	Romania
2025	Sofia, Bulgaria	Bulgaria	United States of America	Uzbekistan

=== Rope ===
Team Medalists
Year	Location	Gold	Silver	Bronze
2019	Moscow, Russia	(Russia) Anastasia Simakova	(Italy) Sofia Raffaeli	(Azerbaijan) Arzu Jalilova

=== Hoop ===
Team Medalists
Year	Location	Gold	Silver	Bronze
2023	Cluj-Napoca, Romania	(Israel) Alona Tal Franco	(Romania) Amalia Lică	(Uzbekistan) Anastasiya Sarantseva
2025	Sofia, Bulgaria	(Bulgaria) Magdalena Valkova	(Kazakhstan) Akmaral Yerekesheva	(United States) Natalie de la Rosa

=== Ball ===
Team Medalists
Year	Location	Gold	Silver	Bronze
2019	Moscow, Russia	(Russia) Lala Kramarenko	(Azerbaijan) Arzu Jalilova	(Israel) Noga Block
2023	Cluj-Napoca, Romania	(Bulgaria) Elvira Krasnobaeva	(Germany) Lada Pusch	(Israel) Regina Polishchuk
2025	Sofia, Bulgaria	(Kazakhstan) Akmaral Yerekesheva	(China) Wang Qi	(Georgia (country)) Nita Jamagidze

=== Clubs ===
Team Medalists
Year	Location	Gold	Silver	Bronze
2019	Moscow, Russia	(Russia) Lala Kramarenko	(Italy) Sofia Raffaeli	(Israel) Adi Asya Katz
2023	Cluj-Napoca, Romania	(Poland) Liliana Lewińska	(Ukraine) Taisiia Onofriichuk	(United States) Rin Keys
2025	Sofia, Bulgaria	(Kyrgyzstan) Zlata Arkatova	(Egypt) Farida Bahnas (Poland) Kseniya Zhyzhych	Not awarded

=== Ribbon ===
Team Medalists
Year	Location	Gold	Silver	Bronze
2019	Moscow, Russia	(Russia) Dariia Sergaeva	(Israel) Adi Asya Katz	(Spain) Salma Solaun
2023	Cluj-Napoca, Romania	(Poland) Liliana Lewińska	(Bulgaria) Nikol Todorova	(Uzbekistan) Mishel Nesterova
2025	Sofia, Bulgaria	(Kazakhstan) Akmaral Yerekesheva	(Egypt) Lina Heleika	(Bulgaria) Magdalena Valkova

== All-time medal table ==
Last updated after the 2025 Junior World Championships.

Rank	Nation	Gold	Silver	Bronze	Total
1	Russia	8	0	0	8
2	Bulgaria	7	3	2	12
3	Israel	3	3	5	11
4	Kazakhstan	2	1	0	3
4	Poland	2	1	0	3
6	Ukraine	1	1	1	3
7	Kyrgyzstan	1	0	0	1
8	Italy	0	6	1	7
9	Brazil	0	2	0	2
9	Egypt	0	2	0	2
11	Azerbaijan	0	1	4	5
12	Belarus	0	1	2	3
12	United States	0	1	2	3
14	Romania	0	1	1	2
15	China	0	1	0	1
15	Germany	0	1	0	1
17	Uzbekistan	0	0	3	3
18	Estonia	0	0	1	1
18	Georgia	0	0	1	1
18	Spain	0	0	1	1
Totals (20 entries)		24	25	24	73
