= Rhythmic Gymnastics Junior European Championships =

The Rhythmic Gymnastics Junior European Championships are the European championships for junior gymnasts for the sport of rhythmic gymnastics. They were first held in 1987. Prior to 1993, they were held as a separate event. Since the 1993 edition in Bucharest, Romania, the Junior European Championships were integrated to the senior European Championships. The competition is organized by the European Union of Gymnastics.

== Editions ==
Year	Edition	Host city	Country
1987	1	Athens	Greece
1989	2	Tenerife	Spain
1991	3	Lisbon	Portugal
1993	4	Bucharest	Romania
1994	5	Thessalonika	Greece
1995	6	Prague	Czech Republic
1996	7	Asker	Norway
1997	8	Patras	Greece
1999	9	Budapest	Hungary
2001	10	Geneva	Switzerland
2003	11	Riesa	Germany
2005	12	Moscow	Russia
2006	13	Moscow	Russia
2007	14	Baku	Azerbaijan
2008	15	Turin	Italy
2009	16	Baku	Azerbaijan
2010	17	Bremen	Germany
2011	18	Minsk	Belarus
2012	19	Nizhny Novgorod	Russia
2013	20	Vienna	Austria
2014	21	Baku	Azerbaijan
2015	22	Minsk	Belarus
2016	23	Holon	Israel
2017	24	Budapest	Hungary
2018	25	Guadalajara	Spain
2019	26	Baku	Azerbaijan
2020	27	Kyiv	Ukraine
2021	28	Varna	Bulgaria
2022	29	Tel Aviv	Israel
2023	30	Baku	Azerbaijan
2024	31	Budapest	Hungary
2025	32	Tallinn	Estonia
2026	33	Varna	Bulgaria

== Medalists ==
Teodora Alexandrova (Bulgaria), Dimitrinka Todorova (Bulgaria), Rosabel Espinosa (Spain), Yelena Shalamova (Russia) and Amalia Lica (Romania), hold the record of most medals earned at the Junior European Championships, with six medals each. Shalamova, Lica, Polina Shmatko (Russia) and Elizabeth Koleva (Bulgaria) hold the record for most gold medals, with five each.

=== Team ===
Junior Team event has been held since 2006 on two years. Teams consisted of 2-4 junior individual gymnasts. Since 2017, team competition is held every year and either consists of Junior individual gymnasts and Senior group or Senior individual gymnasts and Junior group.

Team All-Around Medalists
Year	Location	Gold	Silver	Bronze
2006	Moscow, Russia	Russia	Belarus	Bulgaria
2008	Turin, Italy	Russia	Belarus	Ukraine
2010	Bremen, Germany	Russia	Belarus	Germany
2012	Nizhny Novgorod, Russia	Russia	Belarus	(Georgia (country)) Georgia
2014	Baku, Azerbaijan	Russia	Belarus	Azerbaijan
2016	Holon, Israel	Russia	Belarus	Italy
2017	Budapest, Hungary	Russia	Belarus	Bulgaria
2018	Guadalajara, Spain	Russia	Ukraine	Bulgaria
2019	Baku, Azerbaijan	Russia	Belarus	Bulgaria
2020	Kyiv, Ukraine	Ukraine	Israel	Azerbaijan
2022	Tel Aviv, Israel	Israel	Romania	Bulgaria
2024	Budapest, Hungary	Romania	Israel	Azerbaijan
2026	Varna, Bulgaria	Bulgaria	Ukraine	Israel

=== Junior Individual ===
==== Rope ====
Rope Medalists
Year	Location	Gold	Silver	Bronze
2006	Moscow, Russia	(Russia) Aleksandra Ermakova	(Belarus) Anastasia Ivankova	(Bulgaria) Filipa Siderova
2008	Turin, Italy	(Russia) Daria Andronova	(Belarus) Melitina Staniouta	(Bulgaria) Tsvetelina Stoyanova
2010	Bremen, Germany	(Russia) Alexandra Merkulova	(Belarus) Arina Charopa	(Ukraine) Viktoriia Shynkarenko
2016	Holon, Israel	(Russia) Alina Ermolova	(Belarus) Julia Evchik	(Italy) Alexandra Agiurgiuculese
2020	Kyiv, Ukraine	(Belarus) Dina Agisheva	(Israel) Daria Atamanov	(Bulgaria) Eva Brezalieva

==== Hoop ====
Hoop Medalists
Year	Location	Gold	Silver	Bronze
2006	Moscow, Russia	(Russia) Ekaterina Donich	(Bulgaria) Filipa Siderova	(Ukraine) Valeriya Shurkhal
2008	Turin, Italy	(Belarus) Aliaksandra Narkevich	(Russia) Diana Botsieva	(Bulgaria) Gabriela Kirova
2010	Bremen, Germany	(Russia) Valeria Tkachenko	(Belarus) Nataliya Leshchyk	(Germany) Jana Berezko-Marggrander
2012	Nizhny Novgorod, Russia	(Russia) Diana Borisova	(Belarus) Elena Bolotina	(Azerbaijan) Nilufar Niftaliyeva
2014	Baku, Azerbaijan	(Russia) Yulia Bravikova	(Azerbaijan) Zhala Piriyeva	(Belarus) Anastasiya Rybakova
2016	Holon, Israel	(Russia) Maria Sergeeva	(Belarus) Alina Harnasko (Israel) Nicol Zelikman	—N/a
2018	Guadalajara, Spain	(Russia) Polina Shmatko	(Bulgaria) Tatyana Volozhanina	(Ukraine) Khrystyna Pohranychna
2022	Tel Aviv, Israel	(Bulgaria) Elvira Krasnobaeva	(Poland) Liliana Lewinska	(Israel) Alona Tal Franco
2024	Budapest, Hungary	(Romania) Amalia Lică	(Israel) Alona Tal Franco	(Poland) Olivia Maslov
2026	Varna, Bulgaria	(Bulgaria) Siyana Alenkova	(Russia) Kseniia Savinova	(Italy) Flavia Cassano

==== Ball ====
Ball Medalists
Year	Location	Gold	Silver	Bronze
2008	Turin, Italy	(Russia) Yana Lukonina	(Bulgaria) Boyanka Angelova	(Belarus) Hanna Rabtsava
2010	Bremen, Germany	(Russia) Alexandra Merkulova	(Azerbaijan) Lala Yusifova	(Germany) Jana Berezko-Marggrander
2012	Nizhny Novgorod, Russia	(Russia) Yana Kudryavtseva	(Belarus) Katsiaryna Halkina	(Ukraine) Anastasiia Mulmina
2014	Baku, Azerbaijan	(Russia) Irina Annenkova	(Belarus) Mariya Trubach	(Bulgaria) Boryana Kaleyn
2016	Holon, Israel	(Russia) Polina Shmatko	(Italy) Alexandra Agiurgiuculese	(Israel) Nicol Zelikman
2018	Guadalajara, Spain	(Russia) Lala Kramarenko	(Ukraine) Khrystyna Pohranychna	(Azerbaijan) Arzu Jalilova
2020	Kyiv, Ukraine	(Ukraine) Polina Karika	(Bulgaria) Stiliana Nikolova	(Belarus) Yelyzaveta Zorkina
2022	Tel Aviv, Israel	(Israel) Michelle Munits	(Bulgaria) Elvira Krasnobaeva	(Romania) Christina Dragan
2024	Budapest, Hungary	(Israel) Meital Maayam Sumkin	(Italy) Anna Piergentili	(Bulgaria) Magdalena Valkova
2026	Varna, Bulgaria	(Belarus) Kira Babkevich	(Germany) Melissa Diete	(Ukraine) Varvara Chubarova

==== Clubs ====
Clubs Medalists
Year	Location	Gold	Silver	Bronze
2006	Moscow, Russia	(Russia) Natalia Pichuzhkina	(Belarus) Maria Yushkevich	(Ukraine) Darya Kushnerova
2012	Nizhny Novgorod, Russia	(Russia) Julia Sinitsyna	(Belarus) Maria Kadobina	(Georgia (country)) Gabriela Khvedelidze
2014	Baku, Azerbaijan	(Russia) Olesya Petrova	(Belarus) Mariya Trubach	(Israel) Linoy Ashram
2016	Holon, Israel	(Russia) Polina Shmatko	(Italy) Alexandra Agiurgiuculese	(Belarus) Yuliya Isachanka
2018	Guadalajara, Spain	(Russia) Daria Trubnikova	(Belarus) Anna Kamenshchikova	(Israel) Valeria Sotskova
2020	Kyiv, Ukraine	(Israel) Daria Atamanov	(Belarus) Yelyzaveta Zorkina	(Hungary) Evelin Viktoria Kocsis
2022	Tel Aviv, Israel	(Romania) Amalia Lică	(Poland) Liliana Lewinska	(Azerbaijan) Kamila Gafarova
2024	Budapest, Hungary	(Romania) Amalia Lică	(Slovenia) Alja Ponikvar	(Israel) Alona Tal Franco
2026	Varna, Bulgaria	(Georgia (country)) Nita Jamagidze	(Bulgaria) Dea Emilova	(Israel) Mariia Miachina

==== Ribbon ====
Ribbon Medalists
Year	Location	Gold	Silver	Bronze
2006	Moscow, Russia	(Russia) Daria Kondakova	(Bulgaria) Bilyana Prodanova	(Ukraine) Darya Kushnerova
2008	Turin, Italy	(Russia) Daria Dmitrieva	(Belarus) Melitina Staniouta	(Italy) Federica Febbo
2010	Bremen, Germany	(Russia) Valeria Tkachenko	(Belarus) Arina Charopa	(Ukraine) Oleksandra Gridasova
2012	Nizhny Novgorod, Russia	(Russia) Aleksandra Soldatova	(Belarus) Katsiaryna Halkina	(Azerbaijan) Gulsum Shafizada
2014	Baku, Azerbaijan	(Russia) Irina Annenkova	(Ukraine) Valeriya Khanina	(Israel) Linoy Ashram
2018	Guadalajara, Spain	(Russia) Lala Kramarenko	(Ukraine) Khrystyna Pohranychna	(Italy) Talisa Torretti
2020	Kyiv, Ukraine	(Bulgaria) Stiliana Nikolova	(Ukraine) Karina Sydorak	(Israel) Daria Atamanov
2022	Tel Aviv, Israel	(Israel) Daniela Munits	(Italy) Tara Dragas	(Poland) Liliana Lewinska
2024	Budapest, Hungary	(Romania) Amalia Lică	(Bulgaria) Dara Malinova	(Georgia (country)) Barbare Kajaia
2026	Varna, Bulgaria	(Russia) Iana Zaikina	(Ukraine) Sofiia Krainska	(Germany) Melissa Diete

=== Junior Groups ===
==== All-Around ====
Junior Group All-Around has been held since 2011. It was not organized in 2017.

Group All-Around Medalists
Year	Location	Gold	Silver	Bronze
2011	Minsk, Belarus	Belarus	Russia	Israel
2013	Vienna, Austria	Russia	Belarus	Bulgaria
2015	Minsk, Belarus	Russia	Belarus	Israel
2019	Baku, Azerbaijan	Russia	Israel	Belarus
2021	Varna, Bulgaria	Russia	Bulgaria	Israel
2023	Baku, Azerbaijan	Israel	Bulgaria	Azerbaijan
2025	Tallinn, Estonia	Ukraine	Spain	Italy

==== Single apparatus ====
since 2019 there are two competitions with two different single apparatus

Group Single Apparatus Medalists
Year	Location	Gold	Silver	Bronze
1996	Asker, Norway	Russia	Belarus	Italy
1997	Patras, Greece	Greece	Belarus	Russia
1999	Budapest, Hungary	Russia	Bulgaria	Greece
2001	Geneva, Switzerland	Russia	Greece	Belarus
2003	Riesa, Germany	Russia	Greece	Bulgaria
2005	Moscow, Russia	Belarus	Russia	Greece
2007	Baku, Azerbaijan	Russia	Bulgaria	Belarus
2009	Baku, Azerbaijan	Russia	Azerbaijan	Belarus
2011	Minsk, Belarus	Russia	Belarus	Azerbaijan
2013	Vienna, Austria	Russia	Azerbaijan	Belarus
2015	Minsk, Belarus	Belarus	Russia	Bulgaria
2017	Budapest, Hungary	Russia	Italy	Israel
2019	Baku, Azerbaijan	Russia Russia	Ukraine Israel	Belarus Belarus
2021	Varna, Bulgaria	Russia Russia	Bulgaria Bulgaria	Belarus Israel
2023	Baku, Azerbaijan	Bulgaria Bulgaria	Israel Israel	Italy Azerbaijan
2025	Tallinn, Estonia	Italy Ukraine	Poland Israel	Israel Bulgaria

== All-time medal table ==
1987–2025

- Last updated after the 2026 European Championships (clubs final)

Rank	Nation	Gold	Silver	Bronze	Total
1	Russia (RUS)	58	8	6	72
2	Bulgaria (BUL)	29	25	19	73
3	Belarus (BLR)	10	32	14	56
4	Israel (ISR)	6	10	15	31
5	Soviet Union (Soviet Union)	6	6	6	18
6	Romania (ROU)	5	2	1	8
7	Ukraine (UKR)	4	7	13	24
8	Greece (GRE)	2	2	3	7
9	Italy (ITA)	1	6	8	15
10	Spain (ESP)	1	5	6	12
11	Georgia (GEO)	1	0	3	4
12	Azerbaijan (AZE)	0	4	10	14
13	Poland (POL)	0	3	3	6
14	Germany (GER)	0	1	3	4
15	Slovenia (SLO)	0	1	0	1
16	Hungary (HUN)	0	0	1	1
Totals (16 entries)		123	112	111	346
