= Laura Paris =

Italian rhythmic gymnast (born 2002)

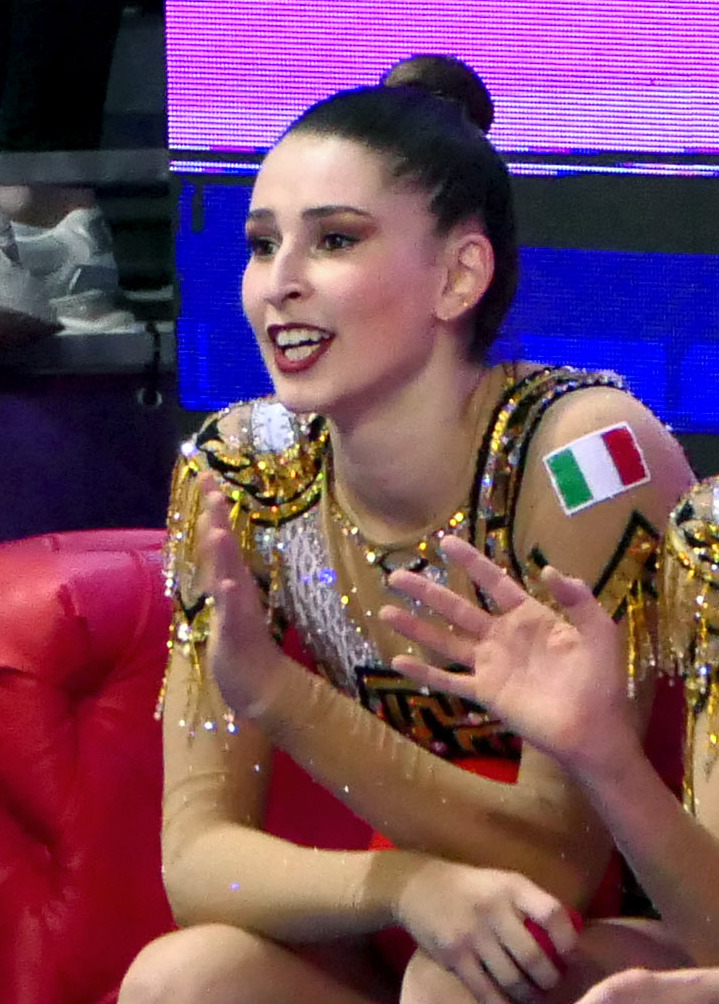

Personal information
- Born: 7 September 2002 (age 23) Rho, Italy
- Height: 174 cm (5 ft 9 in)

Gymnastics career
- Discipline: Rhythmic gymnastics
- Country represented: Italy (2016-25)
- Club: Ritmica Moderna Legnano
- Former coaches: Mariela Pashalieva; Emanuela Maccarani
- Choreographer: Federica Bagnera
- Retired: 2026
Medal record
Rhythmic Gymnastics
Representing Italy
Olympic Games
Bronze medal – third place	2024 Paris	Group All-around
World Championships
Gold medal – first place	2021 Kitakyushu	3 Hoops + 4 Clubs
Gold medal – first place	2022 Sofia	Team
Gold medal – first place	2022 Sofia	5 Hoops
Silver medal – second place	2021 Kitakyushu	Team
Silver medal – second place	2021 Kitakyushu	Group All-around
Silver medal – second place	2021 Kitakyushu	5 Balls
Silver medal – second place	2022 Sofia	3 Ribbons + 2 Balls
Bronze medal – third place	2023 Valencia	Team
Bronze medal – third place	2023 Valencia	5 Hoops
European Championships
Gold medal – first place	2022 Tel Aviv	5 Hoops
Gold medal – first place	2022 Tel Aviv	3 Ribbons + 2 Balls
Gold medal – first place	2024 Budapest	5 Hoops
Gold medal – first place	2025 Tallinn	Team
Silver medal – second place	2022 Tel Aviv	Group All-around
Silver medal – second place	2022 Tel Aviv	Team
Silver medal – second place	2024 Budapest	Group All-around
Silver medal – second place	2024 Budapest	Team
Bronze medal – third place	2023 Baku	5 Hoops
Bronze medal – third place	2025 Tallinn	5 Ribbons
European Cup
Silver medal – second place	2024 Baku	All-around
Silver medal – second place	2024 Baku	5 Hoops
Silver medal – second place	2024 Baku	3 Ribbons + 2 Balls

Laura Paris (born 7 September 2002) is a retired Italian group rhythmic gymnast. She won a bronze medal at the 2024 Summer Olympics in the group all-around final. She is the 2021 World champion in 3 hoops and 4 clubs and the 2022 World champion in 5 hoops and team, a two-time (2022, 2024) European champion in 5 hoops and the 2022 European champion in 3 ribbons + 2 balls.

== Early life ==
Paris was born on 7 September 2002 in Rho, Lombardy. Her father, Federico Paris, competed in track cycling at international level and won multiple World titles in 1990, 1992 and 1993.

== Gymnastics career ==
=== 2021 ===
Paris was called up to join the main Italian group for the first time at the 2021 Baku World Cup. There, the Italian group won three silver medals. She was the reserve for the Italian group at the 2020 Summer Olympics. She was then selected to compete at the 2021 World Championships. She helped Italy win the silver medal in the group all-around behind Russia. In the event finals, they won the gold medal in 3 hoops and 4 clubs and the silver medal in 5 balls. Additionally, the Italian group and individuals Alexandra Agiurgiuculese, Milena Baldassarri, and Sofia Raffaeli won the silver medal in the team competition.

=== 2022 ===
Paris helped the Italian group win two gold medals and one silver medal at the 2022 Baku World Cup. They then swept the gold medals at the Pamplona World Challenge Cup. They once again swept the gold medals at their home World Cup stage in Pesaro. They won a silver medal in the group all-around at the 2022 European Championships behind Israel, but they won gold in both event finals. At the 2022 World Championships, they missed out on a group all-around medal and an Olympic berth, but the Italian team of the group, Milena Baldassarri, and Sofia Raffaeli won the team competition. In the event finals, they won the gold medal in 5 hoops and the silver medal behind Bulgaria in 3 ribbons and 2 balls.

=== 2023 ===
Paris and the Italian group won a gold medal in 3 ribbons and 2 balls at the Athens World Cup. They then won the all-around title at the Milan World Cup after winning a tie-breaker over Israel. They lost to Israel in the 5 hoops final but won 3 ribbons and 2 balls. They won the bronze medal in 5 hoops at the 2023 European Championships. At the 2023 World Championships, the Italian group finished fourth in the all-around after multiple mistakes in the 3 ribbons and 2 balls routine. However, they did qualify for the 2024 Summer Olympics as they were among the top five eligible groups. They did qualify for the 5 hoops final and won the bronze medal behind China and Spain in addition to winning a team bronze medal.

=== 2024 ===
Paris helped the Italian group sweep the gold medals at the Athens World Cup. They swept the silver medals at the European Cup. Then at the 2024 European Championships, the Italian group won the title in 5 hoops. Additionally, they won silver medals in the group all-around and team events. Paris competed at the 2024 Summer Olympics alongside Alessia Maurelli, Martina Centofanti, Agnese Duranti, and Daniela Mogurean. She was the youngest member of the group at age 21 and the only Olympic debutant. The group went on to win the bronze medal in the group all-around final, behind China and Israel.

=== 2025 ===
She became the captain of the Italian team, under the coaching of Mariela Pashalieva. Her first competition in 2025 was in June, alongside Chiara Badii, Serena Ottaviani, Alexandra Naclerio, Sofia Sicignano and Giulia Segatori at the European Championships in Tallinn, Estonia, where the group won bronze medal in 5 Ribbons final. They took 5th place in group all-around due to mistakes in mixed routine. Together with Tara Dragas, Sofia Raffaeli and Alice Taglietti they won team gold medal.

In July, she and Giulia Segatori, Chiara Badii, Sofia Sicignano, Lorjen D’Ambrogio and Laura Golfarelli won gold medal in 5 ribbons final at Milano World Cup. They took 8th place in all-around and did not qualify to hoops+ball final. At World Challenge Cup in Cluj-Napoca, Romania, they took 11th place in all-around. In 3 Balls + 2 Hoops final, they won bronze medal. In August, she and her group competed at the 2025 World Championships in Rio de Janeiro, Brazil. They made mistakes in both routines and finished on 15th place in all-around. Together with Sofia Raffaeli and Tara Dragas they took 6th place in team competition.

Paris announced her retirement from competitive sport in February 2026.

== Detailed Olympic results ==
Year	Competition Description	Location	Music	Apparatus	Rank	Score-Final	Rank	Score-Qualifying
2024	Olympics	Paris		All-around	3rd	68.100	2nd	69.350
2024	Olympics	Paris	Scherzo Molto Vivace from Symphony No. 9, Greatness by Audiomachine, Vo Williams	5 Hoops	3rd	36.100	2nd	38.200
2024	Olympics	Paris	The Ecstasy of Gold' by Ennio Morricone, Czech National Symphony Orchestra	3 Ribbons + 2 Balls	4th	32.000	6th	31.150
