= Giulia Segatori =

Italian rhythmic gymnast (born 2004)

- Full name: Giulia Segatori
- Born: 5 May 2004 (age 22) Genova, Italy

Gymnastics career
- Discipline: Rhythmic gymnastics
- Country represented: Italy; (2019-)
- Club: Aeronautica Militare
- Assistant coaches: Elisa Quilici, Serena Farina
- Former coaches: Mariela Pashalieva, Emanuela Maccarani, Julieta Cantaluppi
Medal record
Representing Italy
Group Rhythmic Gymnastics
European Championships
Gold medal – first place	2025 Tallinn	Team
Bronze medal – third place	2025 Tallinn	5 Ribbons
European Cup
Gold medal – first place	2025 Baku	5 Ribbons
Silver medal – second place	2025 Baku	Cross battle
Bronze medal – third place	2025 Baku	3 Balls + 2 Hoops
Junior World Championships
Silver medal – second place	2019 Moscow	Group All-around
Silver medal – second place	2019 Moscow	5 Hoops
Silver medal – second place	2019 Moscow	Team
Junior European Championships
Bronze medal – third place	2019 Baku	Group All-around

Giulia Segatori (born 5 May 2004) is an Italian group rhythmic gymnast.

== Career ==
Giulia took up rhythmic gymnastics in club PGS Auxilium in Genoa.

=== Junior ===
Giulia first appeared in the national team in 2019, as a member of junior group which competed at the 2019 European Junior Championships and won bronze medal in group All-around. In June group competed at the 2019 Junior World Championships in Moscow and won three silver medals - in team event (with Sofia Raffaeli), in 5 Hoops and in group All-around. They took 8th place in 5 Ribbons final.

=== Senior ===
In 2021, she started competing as a member of Italian National reserve group. Since 2023, she has competed as a member of the Centro Sportivo Aeronautica Militare. That year, she debuted at her first World Cup in Palaio Faliro, Greece, replacing Agnese Duranti for a short time. She and her teammates Alessia Maurelli, Martina Centofanti, Daniela Mogurean, Laura Paris and Alessia Russo won silver medal in 5 Hoops and gold in 3 Ribbons and 2 Balls. In April, they competed at Sofia World Cup and won gold medal in 5 Hoops final.

In 2025, she became a part of the new national group, since the girls from 2024 Paris Olympics team retired. In April, she and Alexandra Naclerio, Serena Ottaviani, Laura Golfarelli, Sofia Sicignano and Chiara Badii competed at World Cup Baku where they took 6th place in group All-around and 6th place in both apparatus finals. In May, they competed at the 2025 European Cup in Baku and won gold medal in 5 Ribbons and bronze in 3 Balls + 2 Hoops. They also took silver medal in Group All-around Cross battles. In June, Giulia and the group competed at the European Championships in Tallinn, Estonia, where they won bronze medal in 5 Ribbons final. They took 5th place in group all-around due to mistakes in mixed routine. Together with Tara Dragas, Sofia Raffaeli and Alice Taglietti they won team gold medal.

In July, Giulia and Laura Paris, Chiara Badii, Sofia Sicignano, Lorjen D’Ambrogio and Laura Golfarelli won gold medal in 5 ribbons final at Milano World Cup. They took 8th place in all-around and did not qualify to hoops+ball final. At World Challenge Cup in Cluj-Napoca, Romania, they took 11th place in all-around. In 3 Balls + 2 Hoops final, they won bronze medal. In August, she and her group competed at the 2025 World Championships in Rio de Janeiro, Brazil. They made mistakes in both routines and finished on 15th place in all-around. Together with Sofia Raffaeli and Tara Dragas they took 6th place in team competition.

In 2026, Segatori remained in the main group together with Alexandra Naclerio, Sofia Maffeis, Lorjen D'Ambrogio, Sofia Colombo and Alessia Rigato. In early April they debuted on international level at Grand Prix Thiais. They took 12th place in all-around due to big mistakes in mixed apparatus routine. Next weekend, they took 8th place in all-around at World Cup Tashkent. In June, they competed at World Challenge Cup Cluj-Napoca and took 9th place in all-around. They placed 5th in 5 balls final.
