= Laura Golfarelli =

Italian rhythmic gymnast (born 2007)

- Full name: Laura Golfarelli
- Born: 25 January 2007 (age 19) San Mauro Torinese, Italy

Gymnastics career
- Discipline: Rhythmic gymnastics
- Country represented: Italy (2025-)
- Club: Eurogymnica
- Gym: Accademia Internazionale di Desio
- Head coach: Mariela Pashalieva
- Former coaches: Tiziana Colognese, Elisa Vaccaro
Medal record
Representing Italy
Group Rhythmic Gymnastics
European Cup
Gold medal – first place	2025 Baku	5 Ribbons
Silver medal – second place	2025 Baku	Cross battle
Bronze medal – third place	2025 Baku	3 Balls + 2 Hoops

Laura Golfarelli (born 25 January 2007) is an Italian group rhythmic gymnast.

== Career ==
=== Junior ===
In 2022, she helped her team from Eurogymnica win gold medal at Italian Serie A2 Club championship.

=== Senior ===
In May 2024 she was recognized by Emanuela Maccarani, who invited her to selection trainings for the National Rhythmic Gymnastics team of Italy.

In 2025, she competed for the first time as part of the new national group, since the girls from 2024 Paris Olympics team retired. In April, she and Alexandra Naclerio, Giulia Segatori, Chiara Badii, Sofia Sicignano and Serena Ottaviani competed at World Cup Baku where they took 6th place in group All-around and 6th place in both apparatus finals.

In July, Laura and Laura Paris, Giulia Segatori, Sofia Sicignano, Lorjen D’Ambrogio and Chiara Badii won gold medal in 5 ribbons final at Milano World Cup. They took 8th place in all-around and did not qualify to hoops+ball final. At World Challenge Cup in Cluj-Napoca, Romania, they took 11th place in all-around. In 3 Balls + 2 Hoops final, they won bronze medal. In August, she and her group competed at the 2025 World Championships in Rio de Janeiro, Brazil. They made mistakes in both routines and finished on 15th place in all-around. Together with Sofia Raffaeli and Tara Dragas they took 6th place in team competition.
