= Serena Ottaviani =

Italian rhythmic gymnast (born 2005)

- Full name: Serena Ottaviani
- Nickname: Sere
- Born: 5 October 2005 (age 20) San Severino Marche, Italy

Gymnastics career
- Discipline: Rhythmic gymnastics
- Country represented: Italy; (2019-)
- Club: Aeronautica Militare
- Head coach: Mariela Pashalieva
- Former coaches: Emanuela Maccarani, Julieta Cantaluppi
Medal record
Representing Italy
Group Rhythmic Gymnastics
European Championships
Gold medal – first place	2025 Tallinn	Team
Bronze medal – third place	2025 Tallinn	5 Ribbons
European Cup
Gold medal – first place	2025 Baku	5 Ribbons
Silver medal – second place	2025 Baku	Cross battle
Bronze medal – third place	2025 Baku	3 Balls + 2 Hoops
Bronze medal – third place	2026 Baku	5 Balls
Junior World Championships
Silver medal – second place	2019 Moscow	Group All-around
Silver medal – second place	2019 Moscow	5 Hoops
Silver medal – second place	2019 Moscow	Team
Junior European Championships
Bronze medal – third place	2019 Baku	Group All-around

Serena Ottaviani (born 5 October 2005) is an Italian group rhythmic gymnast.

== Career ==
=== Junior ===
Serena first appeared in the national team in 2019, when she was a captain of the junior group which competed at the 2019 European Junior Championships and won bronze medal in group All-around. In June group competed at the 2019 Junior World Championships in Moscow and won three silver medals - in team event (with Sofia Raffaeli), in 5 Hoops and in group All-around. They took 8th place in 5 Ribbons final.

=== Senior ===
In 2021, she started competing as a member of Italian National reserve group. Since 2024, she has competed as a member of the Centro Sportivo Aeronautica Militare.

In 2025, she competed for the first time as part of the new national group, since the girls from 2024 Paris Olympics team retired. In April, she and Alexandra Naclerio, Giulia Segatori, Laura Golfarelli, Sofia Sicignano and Chiara Badii competed at World Cup Baku where they took 6th place in group All-around and 6th place in both apparatus finals. In May, they competed at the 2025 European Cup in Baku and won gold medal in 5 Ribbons and bronze in 3 Balls + 2 Hoops. They also took silver medal in Group All-around Cross battles. In June, Serena and the group competed at the European Championships in Tallinn, Estonia, where they won bronze medal in 5 Ribbons final. They took 5th place in group all-around due to mistakes in mixed routine. Together with Tara Dragas, Sofia Raffaeli and Alice Taglietti they won team gold medal.

In 2026 Serena and her teammates from Chieti Sofia Sicignano, Bianca Vignozzi, Chiara Badii and Sasha Mukhina competed at Tartu Grand Prix, winning silver medal in group all-around behind Ukraine. They were 4th in both apparatus finals. In March, they competed at Sofia World Cup, taking 9th place in all-around and a silver medal in 3 hoops + 4 clubs final. In May, they competed at European Cup in Baku, Azerbaijan, and won bronze medal in 5 Balls.
