= Sofia Sicignano =

Italian rhythmic gymnast (born 2004)

- Born: 6 December 2004 (age 21) Pisa

Gymnastics career
- Discipline: Rhythmic gymnastics
- Country represented: Italy; (2023-)
- Club: Motto Viareggio
- Head coach: Mariela Pashalieva
Medal record
Representing Italy
Group Rhythmic Gymnastics
European Championships
Gold medal – first place	2025 Tallinn	Team
Bronze medal – third place	2025 Tallinn	5 Ribbons
European Cup
Gold medal – first place	2025 Baku	5 Ribbons
Silver medal – second place	2025 Baku	Cross battle
Bronze medal – third place	2025 Baku	3 Balls + 2 Hoops
Bronze medal – third place	2026 Baku	5 Balls

Sofia Sicignano (born 6 December 2004) is an Italian rhythmic gymnast. She represents Italy in international competitions as part of the senior group.

== Personal life ==
Sicignano initially practiced figure skating, as time went by she had to choose and she dedicated herself to rhythmic gymnastics. She took up the sport thanks also to her mother, who was part of the Czech national team.

== Career ==
In February 2020, Sicignano helped Motto Viareggio win bronze in the second stage of the Italian club championships. In November 2021 she took bronze at the gold national championships.

In 2022, she took gold with Motto at the stage in Cuneo of the serie A. In April she took second place at the national gold tournament. In May her club won silver in the serie A and then took 7th place overall and won bronze with ball at the Italian Championships. At the bilateral meet with Greece she was 5th in the All-Around.

In February 2023, she won bronze in the Cuneo stage of serie A, repeating the result in Ancona. At the Aphrodite Cup in Athens she won bronze in the All-Around. At the Italian Championships she was 4th overall. In June she took part in the Julieta Shishmanova tournament, winning gold with hoop and with ball.

During the 2024 serie A in Chieti, Motto won silver behind Fabriano. After that competition she was called up for a national control training. In Ancona Motto took 3rd place overall. At the Thiais Grand Prix she was 18th in the All-Around. In June, she took 8th place in all-around at Italian National Championships.

In 2025, she was incorporated into the national group, debuting at the World Cup in Baku being 5th in the All-Around and 6th in both finals. At the European Cup in Baku the group won gold with 5 ribbons, silver in the cross battle and bronze with 3 balls & 2 hoops. In early June she was selected for the European Championships in Tallinn along Chiara Badii, Alexandra Naclerio, Serena Ottaviani, Laura Paris and Giulia Segatori. In Estonia she won gold in teams and bronze with 5 ribbons. Weeks later she was a guest, with her group mates, at Ginnastica in Festa.

In July, Sofia and Laura Paris, Chiara Badii, Giulia Segatori, Lorjen D’Ambrogio and Laura Golfarelli won gold medal in 5 ribbons final at Milano World Cup. They took 8th place in all-around and did not qualify to hoops+ball final. At World Challenge Cup in Cluj-Napoca, Romania, they took 11th place in all-around. In 3 Balls + 2 Hoops final, they won bronze medal. In August, she and her group competed at the 2025 World Championships in Rio de Janeiro, Brazil. They made mistakes in both routines and finished on 15th place in all-around. Together with Sofia Raffaeli and Tara Dragas they took 6th place in team competition.

In 2026 Sofia and her teammates Chiara Badii, Bianca Vignozzi, Serena Ottaviani and Sasha Mukhina competed at Tartu Grand Prix, winning silver medal in group all-around behind Ukraine. They were 4th in both apparatus finals. In March, they competed at Sofia World Cup, taking 9th place in all-around and a silver medal in 3 hoops + 4 clubs final. In May, they competed at European Cup in Baku, Azerbaijan, and won bronze medal in 5 Balls. Then they competed at World Challenge Cup in Portimão, and ended on 10th place in all-around and 5th place in 3 hoops + 4 clubs final. In the end of May, they competed at 2026 European Championships in Varna, Bulgaria, and took 13th place in all-around, which was by far lowest result of national team in year. They qualified to 3 hoops + 4 clubs final, ending on 5th place.

In July, they took part in Milan World Cup and placed 13th in all-around and 7th in 5 balls final. In August, she was selected to represent Italy alongside Chiara Badii, Bianca Vignozzi, Serena Ottaviani, Gaia Pozzi and Sasha Mukhina at the 2026 World Championships in Frankfurt, Germany.
