= Chiara Badii =

Italian rhythmic gymnast (born 2007)

- Full name: Chiara Badii
- Born: 30 December 2007 (age 18) Montevarchi, Italy

Gymnastics career
- Discipline: Rhythmic gymnastics
- Country represented: Italy (2025-)
- Club: Società ginnastica Raffaello Motto Viareggio
- Gym: Accademia Internazionale di Desio
- Head coach: Mariela Pashalieva
- Former coaches: Francesca Cupisti, Donatella Lazzeri
Medal record
Representing Italy
Group Rhythmic Gymnastics
European Championships
Gold medal – first place	2025 Tallinn	Team
Bronze medal – third place	2025 Tallinn	5 Ribbons
European Cup
Gold medal – first place	2025 Baku	5 Ribbons
Silver medal – second place	2025 Baku	Cross battle
Bronze medal – third place	2025 Baku	3 Balls + 2 Hoops
Bronze medal – third place	2026 Baku	5 Balls

Chiara Badii (born 30 December 2007) is an Italian group rhythmic gymnast.

== Career ==
Badii began gymnastics at age 8, in ASD Societa Ginnastica Giuseppe Falciai of Arezzo. Later she moved to Viareggio and started training at Società ginnastica Raffaello Motto Viareggio. Her idol is Lara Mori, an artistic gymnast who inspired her with her dedication and Olympic journey.

=== Junior ===
Chiara first appeared in the national team in 2021, when she was a part of the national junior group alongside Viola Sella, Alice Capozucco, Lorjen D'Ambrogio, Martina Lamberti and Gaia Pozzi. They competed at the 2021 Junior European Championships in Varna, Bulgaria, and placed 4th in the group all-around and 7th in both the 5 balls and 5 ribbons finals.

=== Senior ===
In 2024, she competed as individual for her club Motto Viareggio during all stages of the Italian Serie A1 club championship. They won silver medal in the final round in Turin.

In 2025, she competed for the first time as part of the new national group, since the girls from 2024 Paris Olympics team retired. In April, she and Alexandra Naclerio, Giulia Segatori, Laura Golfarelli, Sofia Sicignano and Serena Ottaviani competed at World Cup Baku where they took 6th place in group All-around and 6th place in both apparatus finals. In May, they competed at the 2025 European Cup in Baku and won gold medal in 5 Ribbons and bronze in 3 Balls + 2 Hoops. They also took silver medal in Group All-around Cross battles. In June, Chiara and the group competed at the European Championships in Tallinn, Estonia, where they won bronze medal in 5 Ribbons final. They took 5th place in group all-around due to mistakes in mixed routine. Together with Tara Dragas, Sofia Raffaeli and Alice Taglietti they won team gold medal.

In July, Chiara and Laura Paris, Giulia Segatori, Sofia Sicignano, Lorjen D’Ambrogio and Laura Golfarelli won gold medal in 5 ribbons final at Milano World Cup. They took 8th place in all-around and did not qualify to hoops+ball final. At World Challenge Cup in Cluj-Napoca, Romania, they took 11th place in all-around. In 3 Balls + 2 Hoops final, they won bronze medal. In August, she and her group competed at the 2025 World Championships in Rio de Janeiro, Brazil. They made mistakes in both routines and finished on 15th place in all-around. Together with Sofia Raffaeli and Tara Dragas they took 6th place in team competition.

In 2026 Chiara and her teammates Sofia Sicignano, Bianca Vignozzi, Serena Ottaviani and Sasha Mukhina competed at Tartu Grand Prix, winning silver medal in group all-around behind Ukraine. They were 4th in both apparatus finals. In March, they competed at Sofia World Cup, taking 9th place in all-around and a silver medal in 3 hoops + 4 clubs final. In May, they competed at European Cup in Baku, Azerbaijan, and won bronze medal in 5 Balls.
