= Viola Sella =

Italian rhythmic gymnast

- Born: 18 July 2006 (age 20) Milan, Italy

Gymnastics career
- Discipline: Rhythmic gymnastics
- Country represented: Italy; (2020-present)
- Club: Forza e Corragio
- Head coach: Daniela Vergani
Medal record
Rhythmic Gymnastics
Representing Italy
Mediterranean Games
Bronze medal – third place	2026 Taranto	All-around

Viola Sella (born 18 July 2006) is an Italian rhythmic gymnast. On the national level, she is a three-time (2023, 2024, 2026) Italian National all-around bronze medalist.

== Personal life ==
Sella was brought up to rhythmic gymnastics by her mother, Daniela Vergani, who is also her coach. She has one younger brother, Leo.

== Career ==
In both 2019 and 2020, Sella won the Italian Gold Championship title for her age category.

=== Junior ===
In 2020, she was selected as a junior individual for the European Championships, where she was to perform only her clubs routine. However, the Italian delegation withdrew shortly before departure to avoid the risks associated with the COVID-19 pandemic.

In 2021, she was selected to be part of the Italian national junior group alongside Chiara Badii, Alice Capozucco, Lorjen D'Ambrogio, Martina Lamberti and Gaia Pozzi. They competed at the 2021 Junior European Championships in Varna, Bulgaria, and placed 4th in the group all-around and 7th in both the 5 balls and 5 ribbons finals.

=== Senior ===
Sella started competing as a senior in 2022.

In 2023, she competed at the 2023 Italian National Championships and won the bronze medal in the all-around competition. The next day, she won two bronze medals in the ball and ribbon finals. On July 21-23, she made her World Cup debut at Milano World Cup and took 31st place in the all-around.

The next season, she competed at Tashkent World Cup in April 2024 and took 22nd place in the all-around. On 8 June, she competed at the 2024 Italian National Championships and won the bronze medal in the all-around again. In July, she competed at the World Challenge Cup in Cluj-Napoca, Romania, where she took 18th place in the all-around. Her best result was with ball (13th place).

In 2025, Sella began her season in late February by competing for her club Forza e Corragio during the first stage of the Italian Serie A1 club championship. She performed with hoop and ribbon, and her team took 3rd place. On 4-6 April, she competed at the Sofia World Cup, where she took 25th place in the all-around and did not advance into any apparatus finals. On 25-27 April, she competed at the World Cup Tashkent, where she took 9th place in the all-around. She qualified to the clubs final, where she placed 5th. She was selected to compete at the 2025 European Championships in Tallinn, Estonia, alongside Sofia Raffaeli and Tara Dragas, but an injury forced her to withdraw and she was replaced by Alice Taglietti. She also missed the Serie A Final Six with her club and the Italian National Championships.

In 2026, Viola competed at Sofia World Cup and took 18th place in all-around. She qualified to ball final, ending on 8th place. In June, she competed at the 2026 Italian National Championships and won the bronze medal in the all-around. She also won silver medal in ribbon and bronze medals in hoop, ball and clubs finals. She competed at Cluj-Napoca World Challenge Cup and took 13th place in all-around. She qualified to ribbon final, finishing 5th. In August, she was selected to represent Italy alongside Margherita Fucci at the 2026 Mediterranean Games in Taranto, and won bronze medal in all-around behind Hatice Gokce Emir and Daniela Pico. In October, she competed in the first round of the Italian Serie A1 Club Championship her club Forza e Corragio and took second place. She competed with hoop (28.200) and ball (27.000).

== Routine music information ==
Year	Apparatus	Music Title
2026	Hoop	Say Something by A Great Big World and Christina Aguilera
2026	Ball	My Love by Kovacs
2026	Clubs	The Search by NF
2026	Ribbon	Fighter by Christian Reindl, Dream Harlowe and Power- Haus
2025	Hoop	Below by Leprous
2025	Ball	The Captain by Wicked Cinema
2025	Clubs	Baiana by Barbatuques
2025	Ribbon	Nothing Else Matters (cover) by Marlisa
2024	Hoop	Majesty by Apashe, Wasiu
2024	Ball	Beyond by Tommee Profitt
2024	Clubs	Johnny Got A Boom Boom by Imelda May
2024	Ribbon	King's Gambit by Paul Dinletir (ASCAP)/Jeffrey Emerson Gaiser (ASCAP)
2023	Hoop	The 2nd Law: Unsustainable by Muse
2023	Ball	Breathe by Fleurie
2023	Clubs	The Duel (Live) by HAVASI
2023	Ribbon	I Love Rock 'N Roll by Joan Jett & The Blackhearts
