= Anna Piergentili =

Italian rhythmic gymnast

- Born: 12 January 2009 (age 17) San Severino Marche, Italy

Gymnastics career
- Discipline: Rhythmic Gymnastics
- Country represented: Italy; (2024-present)
- Club: Faber Ginnastica Fabriano
- Head coach: Amina Zaripova
- Former coaches: Claudia Mancinelli, Julieta Cantaluppi, Kristina Guiourova
- Choreographer: Bilyana Dyakova
Medal record
Representing Italy
Rhythmic Gymnastics
Junior European Championships
Silver medal – second place	2024 Budapest	Ball

Anna Piergentili (born 12 January 2009) is an Italian rhythmic gymnast. She is the 2024 European ball junior silver medalist.

== Career ==
=== Junior ===
In October 2023, she participated in the Aeon Cup in Japan with Sofia Raffaeli and Milena Baldassarri, representing their club Ginnastica Farbiano and finishing 4th. Piergentili took 8th place in junior category.

Piergentili join the Italian National Team at the start of 2024. During the year, she participated in the International Sofia Cup in Sofia, Ritam Cup in Belgrade and the European Cup in Baku. In Baku, she placed 4th in the team competition.

Ultimately, she was selected to represent Italy at the 2024 Rhythmic Gymnastics European Championships in Budapest alongside Ludovica Platoni, Magherita Fucci and Carlotta Fulignati. With her only routine being with the ball, she qualified into the ball final in second place and placed fifth in the team competition. In the ball final, she won the silver medal behind Israeli Meital Maayam Sumkin. In September, Piergentili participated in the Aeon Cup in Japan, once again with Sofia Raffaeli and Milena Baldassarri. She placed sixth in the junior all-around competition, and she won the bronze medal in the team competition. On 10 November, she placed 3rd at the Italian Junior Gold National Championships in the Junior 3 category. She also won gold in ball, silver in ribbon and bronze in clubs.

=== Senior ===
In 2025, Piergentili made her senior debut in late February by competing for her club Fabriano during the first stage of the Italian Serie A1 club championship, she competed with the ribbon in the first stage and they placed 7th. The second stage was held on March 15, where Piergentili performed her ball routine and helped her team Fabriano reach 3rd place. On 12 April, Team Fabriano competed at their home stage in Osimo; Piergentili performed her clubs routine, which helped the team win first place. On 14 June, she competed at the 2025 Italian National Championships and took 6th place in the all-around due to some mistakes in her ribbon routine. The day after, she won two bronze medals in the hoop and clubs finals just behind Sofia Raffaeli and Tara Dragas, and she also finished in 4th place in the ball final.

In January 2026, Piergentili went to a two-week camp in Novogorsk, Russia, along with teammates Raffaeli and Veronica Zappaterreni, to train with Russian specialists and to work on choreography with Irina Zenovka; the trip was endorsed by the Italian Gymnastics Federation. The choice to train there was controversial and drew criticism due to the ongoing Russian War in Ukraine. In May, she competed at International tournament of Portimão, winning gold medal in all-around. She also won gold with ball and clubs, and bronze medal in ribbon final. In June, she competed at Italian National Championships and took 6th place in the all-around. She qualified to two apparatus finals, finishing 8th in hoop and 6th in clubs.

== Routine music information ==
Year	Apparatus	Music title
2026	Hoop	"La Forza del Destino (Overture)", by The London Pops Orchestra, composed by Giuseppe Verdi
2026	Ball	"Mio Cristo Piange Diamanti" by Rosalia
2026	Clubs	"Psycho Killer" by Power-Haus, Christian Reindl & Allie Armstrong
2026	Ribbon	"Stranger Birds" by Birdy
2025	Hoop	Serenata by La Maschera
2025	Ball	VALE by Power-Haus, Christian Reindl and Eivør and Balder by Power-Haus and Christian Reindl
2025	Clubs	Big Spender (from Sweet Charity) by Fosse Ensemble & Valarie Pettiford
2025	Ribbon	Bla Bla Bla Cha Cha Cha by Petty Booka
2024	Hoop	Serenata by La Maschera
2024	Ball	Imaginer l'amour by Juliette Armanet
2024	Clubs	Big Spender (from Sweet Charity) by Fosse Ensemble & Valarie Pettiford
2024	Ribbon	Bla Bla Bla Cha Cha Cha by Petty Booka

== Competitive highlights ==
(Team competitions in seniors are held only at the World Championships, Europeans and other Continental Games.)

International: Senior
Year	Event	AA	Team	Hoop	Ball	Clubs	Ribbon
2025	IT Julieta Shishmanova Prize	2nd		2nd	1st	1st	2nd
International: Junior
Year	Event	AA	Team	Hoop	Ball	Clubs	Ribbon
2024	Aeon Cup	6th	3rd				
2024	Junior European Championships		5th		2nd		
2024	European Cup Baku		4th		6th		
2024	IT Ritam Cup				1st		
2023	Aeon Cup	8th	4th				
National
Year	Event	AA	Team	Hoop	Ball	Clubs	Ribbon
2026	Italian National Championships	6th		8th	12th (Q)	6th	18th (Q)
2025	Italian National Championships	6th		3rd	4th	3rd	16th (Q)
National: Junior
Year	Event	AA	Team	Hoop	Ball	Clubs	Ribbon
2024	Italian National Championships	3rd					
2023	Italian National Championships	16th					
2022	Italian National Championships	2nd					
Q = Qualifications (Did not advance to Event Final due to the 2 gymnast per country rule, only Top 8 highest score); WR = World Record; WD = Withdrew; NT = No Team Competition; OC = Out of Competition(competed but scores not counted for qualifications/results)
