= Alexandra Naclerio =

Italian rhythmic gymnast (born 2005)

- Nicknames: Alex, Ale
- Born: 16 July 2005 (age 21) Modena, Italy

Gymnastics career
- Discipline: Rhythmic gymnastics
- Country represented: Italy; (2019-)
- Club: Aeronautica Militare
- Gym: Desio
- Head coaches: Elisa Quilici, Serena Farina
- Former coaches: Mariela Pashalieva, Emanuela Maccarani, Federica Gariboldi
Medal record
Representing Italy
Group Rhythmic Gymnastics
European Championships
Gold medal – first place	2025 Tallinn	Team
Bronze medal – third place	2025 Tallinn	5 Ribbons
European Cup
Gold medal – first place	2025 Baku	5 Ribbons
Silver medal – second place	2025 Baku	Cross battle
Bronze medal – third place	2025 Baku	3 Balls + 2 Hoops
Junior World Championships
Silver medal – second place	2019 Moscow	Group All-around
Silver medal – second place	2019 Moscow	5 Hoops
Silver medal – second place	2019 Moscow	Team
Junior European Championships
Bronze medal – third place	2019 Baku	Group All-around

Alexandra Naclerio (born 16 July 2005) is an Italian rhythmic gymnast. She represents Italy in international competitions as a member of the senior group.

== Career ==
Naclerio took up the sport at age four.

=== Junior ===
She first appeared in the national team in 2019, when she was included in the junior group which competed at the 2019 European Junior Championships and won bronze medal in group All-around. In June the group competed at the 2019 Junior World Championships in Moscow, winning silver in teams, the All-Around and with 5 hoops.

=== Senior ===
In 2021, she started competing as a member of Italian national reserve group. Since 2024, she has competed as a member of the Centro Sportivo Aeronautica Militare.

In 2025 she entered the main group, debuting at the World Cup in Baku along Serena Ottaviani, Giulia Segatori, Laura Golfarelli, Sofia Sicignano and Chiara Badii where they took 6th place in the All-Around and 6th place in both apparatus finals. In May, they competed at the 2025 European Cup in Baku, winning gold with 5 ribbons and bronze with 3 balls & 2 hoops. In June, Alexandra and the group competed at the European Championships in Tallinn, Estonia, where they won bronze medal in 5 Ribbons final. They took 5th place in group all-around due to mistakes in mixed routine. Together with Tara Dragas, Sofia Raffaeli and Alice Taglietti they won team gold medal. In August, she returned to the group to compete at the 2025 World Championships in Rio de Janeiro, Brazil. They made mistakes in both routines and finished on 15th place in all-around. Together with Sofia Raffaeli and Tara Dragas they took 6th place in team competition.

In 2026, Naclerio remained in the main group together with Giulia Segatori, Sofia Maffeis, Lorjen D'Ambrogio, Sofia Colombo and Alessia Rigato. In early April they debuted on international level at Grand Prix Thiais. They took 12th place in all-around due to big mistakes in mixed apparatus routine. Next weekend, they took 8th place in all-around at World Cup Tashkent. In June, they competed at World Challenge Cup Cluj-Napoca and took 9th place in all-around. They placed 5th in 5 balls final.
