= Alessia Russo (gymnast) =

Italian rhythmic gymnast (born 1996)

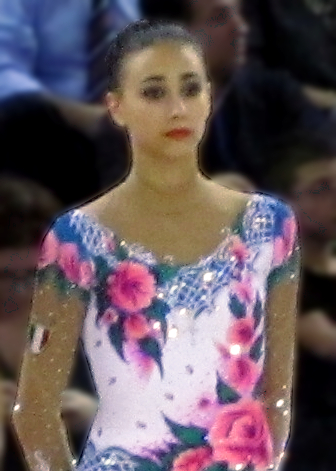
- Russo in 2013

Personal information
- Born: 24 September 1996 (age 30) Figline Valdarno, Italy
- Height: 167 cm (5 ft 6 in)

Gymnastics career
- Discipline: Rhythmic gymnastics
- Country represented: Italy; (2011–2024)
- Head coach: Emanuela Maccarani
- Assistant coach: Germana Germani
Medal record
Representing Italy
Rhythmic Gymnastics
World Championships
Bronze medal – third place	2018 Sofia	Team
Bronze medal – third place	2023 Valencia	Team
Bronze medal – third place	2023 Valencia	5 Hoops
European Championships
Gold medal – first place	2024 Budapest	5 Hoops
Silver medal – second place	2024 Budapest	Group All-around
Silver medal – second place	2024 Budapest	Team
Bronze medal – third place	2023 Baku	5 Hoops
Summer Universiade
Silver medal – second place	2019 Naples	Ribbon

Alessia Russo (born 24 September 1996 in Figline Valdarno, Italy) is a former Italian individual and group rhythmic gymnast. She is the 2019 Summer Universiade Ribbon silver medalist. On national level, she is a three-time (2016, 2018, 2019) Italian National All-around bronze medalist.

== Career ==
=== Junior ===
She competed at the 2011 European Championships in Minsk, Belarus as a member of the Italian junior group. Together with Chiara Di Battista, Carmen Crescenzi, Alessia Medoro, Francesca Medoro and Valentina Savastio she placed 6th in Group All-around and 7th in 5 Ropes final.

=== Senior ===
She made her World Championship debut at the 2013 World Championships in Kyiv, Ukraine, placing 29th in All-around Qualifications. She also competed at the 2014 World Championships in İzmir, Turkey and finished 9th together with teammates Veronica Bertolini and Giulia di Luca.

At the 2018 World Championships in Sofia, Bulgaria, Alessia, Milena Baldassarri and Alexandra Agiurgiuculese won a historic bronze medal for Italy in team competition.

In 2019, she competed at the 2019 Summer Universiade in Naples, Italy, and won silver medal in ribbon final.

In 2020, she switched to competing in group and became a captain of the Italian National reserve group.

In 2023, she joined main group. Together with Martina Centofanti, Agnese Duranti, Alessia Maurelli, Daniela Mogurean and Laura Paris she won bronze medal in 5 Hoops at the 2023 European Championships in Baku, Azerbaijan. They won another bronze medal in 5 Hoops at the 2023 World Championships in Valencia, Spain. Together with Milena Baldassarri and Sofia Raffaeli they won bronze medal in team competition.
