= Talisa =

Talisa is a female given name. Notable people with the name include

== People ==
- Talisa Lanoe (born 1994), Kenyan swimmer
- Talisa Soto (born 1967), American actress
- Talisa Torretti (born 2003), Italian gymnast

== Fictional characters ==
- Talisa Maegyr, Game of Thrones character
