= Hiroomi =

- Gender: Male

Origin
- Origin: Japanese
- Meaning: Different meanings depending on the kanji used

Hiroomi (written: 博臣, 宏臣, 広臣 or 裕臣) is a masculine Japanese given name. Notable people with the name include:

- Hiroomi Fujita (藤田 博臣; born 1976), Japanese judoka
- Hiroomi Iwata (岩田 裕臣; born 1983), Japanese motorcycle racer
- Hiroomi Takizawa (瀧澤 宏臣; born 1973), Japanese freestyle skier
- Hiroomi Tosaka (登坂 広臣; born 1987), Japanese singer and actor
- Hiroomi Umezawa (梅沢 博臣; 1924–1995), Japanese physicist
- Hiroomi Yamada (山田 宏臣; 1942–1981), Japanese long jumper

== See also ==
- Hiromi (disambiguation)
