= Julieta Cantaluppi =

Italian and Bulgarian rhythmic gymnast (born 1985)

- Born: 24 January 1985 (age 41) Como, Italy
- Height: 163 cm (5 ft 4 in)

Gymnastics career
- Discipline: Rhythmic gymnastics
- Country represented: Italy
- Club: Aeronautica Militare
- Head coach: Kristina Guiourova
- Retired: 2012
Medal record
Rhythmic Gymnastics
Mediterranean Games
Gold medal – first place	2009 Pescara	Individual All-Around

Julieta Cantaluppi (born 24 January 1985, in Como) is a retired Italian rhythmic gymnast and currently a coach in rhythmic gymnastics.

== Personal life ==
She was brought to rhythmic gymnastics by her mother, Kristina Guiourova, who was also her coach. She competed in rhythmic gymnastics for Bulgaria and was the World champion with rope at the 1979 World Championships in London. Her grandmother, Julieta Shishmanova, was a famous Bulgarian rhythmic gymnastics coach and member of the FIG Technical Committee. Shishmanova coached some of the greatest Bulgarian individual gymnasts of all time, including Maria Gigova, Neshka Robeva, Rumyana Stefanova and Krassimira Filipova, helping them win numerous world medals.

== Career ==
During her early years, she moved with her mother between various cities and gymnastics clubs in Italy, where she started training and competing. In 1997, her mother decided to return to Bulgaria, where Cantaluppi trained under Neshka Robeva. During this period, she often returned to Italy, competing in both the Italian and Bulgarian championships. In 2002, Julieta and her mother settled permanently at Ginnastica Fabriano, a club they helped grow to the highest competitive level.

In 2003, Cantaluppi joined the Italian national team as an individual gymnast. In 2005, she placed 4th at the Mediterranean Games in Almería and 14th in the all-around at the European Championships in Moscow. In 2008, she finished 15th at the European Championships in Turin. Although she missed qualifying for the 2008 Beijing Olympics, she continued competing. The next year, she won gold at the 2009 Mediterranean Games in Pescara. In 2010, she placed 13th at the European Championships in Bremen.

She finished 11th in the all-around final at the 2011 World Championships in Montpellier and secured her qualification for the 2012 Olympic Games. In London, the same city where her mother had won the World rope title, Cantaluppi competed in the individual all-around event at the 2012 Summer Olympics, where she placed 16th.

After retirement in 2013, Cantaluppi took up coaching at club Ginnastica Fabriano, becoming head Italian coach and overseeing successful Italian rhythmic gymnasts. Her students included Milena Baldassarri (2018 World ribbon silver medalist, 6th at the Tokyo Olympics), Talisa Torretti (2018 Youth Olympic Games all-around bronze medalist) and Sofia Raffaeli (2022 five-times World champion, two times European champion and 2024 Olympic bronze medalist). She also lead the Ginnastica Fabriano team to multiple wins at Italian club championships.

In September 2023 Cantaluppi announced she was stepping down as Italian head coach to pursue other coaching opportunities overseas. Since November 2023, she has worked as a coach for the Israeli national team. She coaches Meital Maayam Sumkin, Lian Rona and the Israeli groups (both junior and senior).

In March 2025, wiretaps were reported by Italian newspapers in which she was accused of abusing two of her athletes (Sofia Raffaeli and Serena Ottaviani) during her time at Ginnastica Fabriano. Raffaeli denied experiencing the alleged abuse.

== Notable pupils ==
Rhythmic gymnasts:

- Letizia Cicconcelli (born in 1999) (1 gold, 1 silver, 2 bronze in World Group, 1 gold and 2 silver in European Group Championships)
- Milena Baldassarri (born in 2001) (2 Olympic All-around finals 2020 Olympics and 2024 Olympics, 1 gold, 2 silver, 3 bronze in World, 2 silver in European Championships, multiple World Cup medals)
- Talisa Torretti (born in 2003) (1 bronze at the 2018 Youth Olympics, 1 bronze in Junior European Championships)
- Sofia Raffaeli (born in 2004) (1 bronze at the 2024 Olympics, 5 gold, 4 silver and 3 bronze in World, 5 gold and 6 silver in European, 3 silver at Junior World Championships, 1 gold and 2 silver in World games, multiple World Cup medals)
- Lian Rona (born in 2008) 1 bronze for team at the European
- Meital Maayan Sumkin (born in 2009) 1 silver and 2 bronze medals at the European Senior, 2 gold medal and 3 silver at the European Junior and several medals at the World Cup
- Alona Tal Franco (born in 2009) 1 silver for team at the European and several medals at the World Cup

Counselor/Coordinator for Italian Junior Group:

- 2017 European Championships Group silver medalists

(Anna Paola Cantatore, Nina Corradini, Melissa Girelli, Francesca Pellegrini, Talisa Torretti, Rebecca Vinti)

- 2019 European Championships Group bronze medalists

(Siria Cella, Alessia Leone, Alexandra Naclerio, Serena Ottaviani, Vittoria Quoiani, Giulia Segatori)

- 2023 European Championships Group bronze medalists

(Virginia Cuttini, Gaia D'Antona, Elisa Dobrovolska, Caterina Maltoni, Cristina Ventura, Bianka Vignozzi)
