= Luca Giuliani =

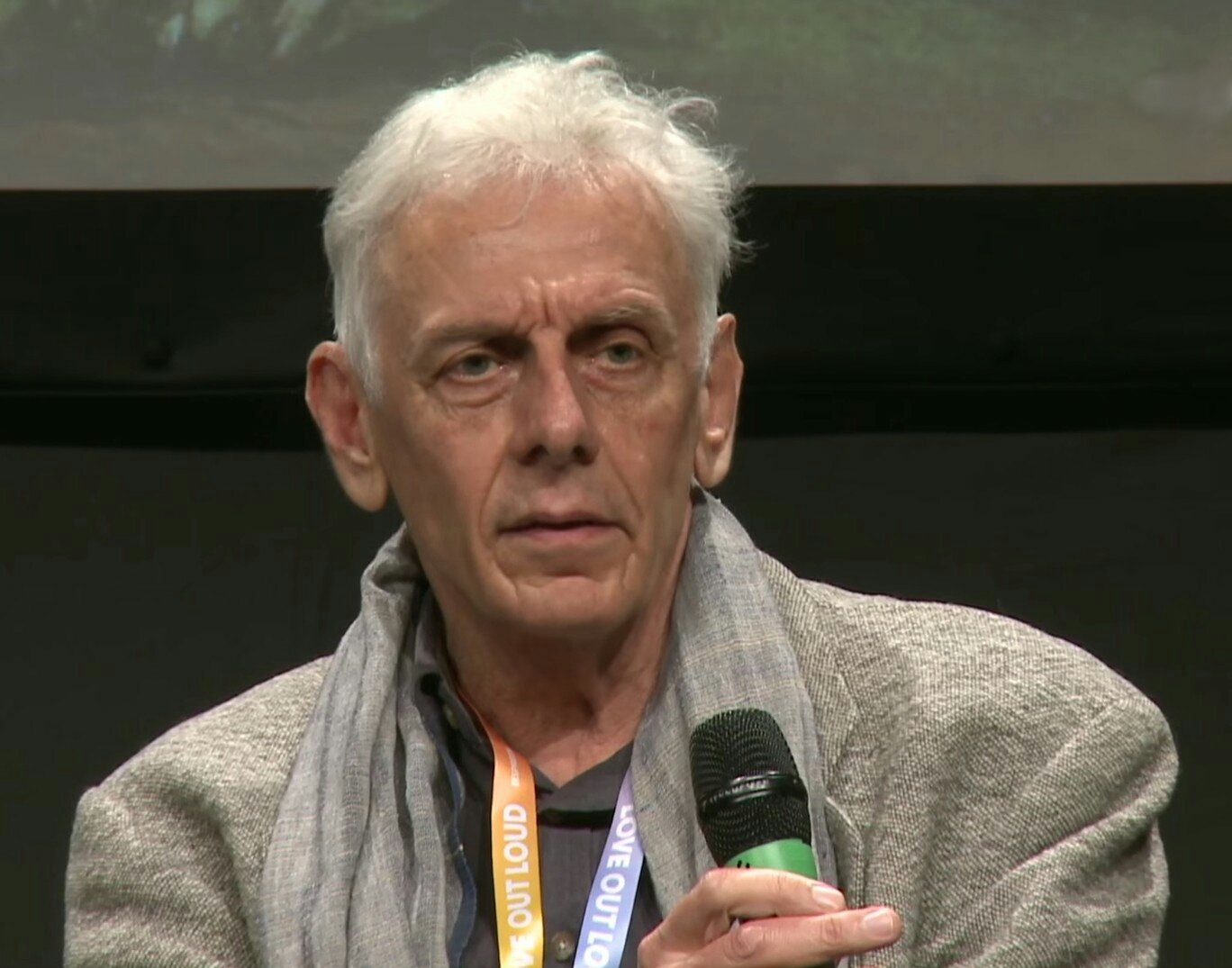
Luca Giuliani, 2017

Luca Giuliani (born 18 April 1950 in Florence, Italy) is a professor at the Humboldt University of Berlin in Greek and Roman archaeology.

== Career ==
Giuliani was curator at the Berliner Antikensammlung from 1982 to 1992. He was a lecturer at the Free University of Berlin's Institute of Classical Archaeology between 1986 and 1991. In 1992, he became Professor of Greek and Roman Archaeology at the University of Freiburg, a position he held until 1998, before taking up the same role at LMU Munich until 2007. Since April 2007, he has been the Rector of the Wissenschaftskolleg zu Berlin (Institute for Advanced Study).

== Bibliography ==
- Giuliani, Luca; O'Donnell, Joseph (2013), Image and myth : a history of pictorial narration in Greek art, University of Chicago Press, ISBN 978-0-226-29765-1
- Giuliani, Luca; Schmidt, Gerhard (2010), Ein Geschenk für den Kaiser : das Geheimnis des grossen Kameo (in German), Beck, ISBN 978-3-406-60054-8
- Schefold, Karl; Giuliani, Luca (1992), Gods and heroes in late archaic Greek art, Cambridge [England], ISBN 978-0-521-32718-3
- Giuliani, Luca (1986), Bildnis und Botschaft : hermeneutische Untersuchungen zur Bildniskunst der römischen Republik, Suhrkamp, ISBN 978-3-518-57818-6
