= Irina Zenovka =

Russian choreographer (born 1972)

Irina Borisovna Zenovka
- Born: Irina Borisovna Lebedeva; 2 September 1972 (age 53); Moscow, RSFSR, USSR
- Occupation: Choreographer
- Known for: Choreographer for the Russian National team in rhythmic gymnastics
- Spouse: Eduard Zenovka

Irina Borisovna Zenovka (Russian: Ирина Борисовна Зеновка; née Lebedeva; born 2 September 1972 in Moscow, RSFSR, USSR) is a Russian choreographer who choreographs for the Russian National team in rhythmic gymnastics.

== Coaching career ==
Zenovka along with Veronica Shatkova, she choreographs programs for most of Russia's National Team in Group and Individual rhythmic gymnasts. She has also choreographed for other international clients: the Israeli Group, USA, Greek, Swedish and Japanese rhythmic gymnasts.

== Personal life ==
Irina is married to Eduard Zenovka, an Olympic medalist in Modern pentathlon in 1992 and 1996.

== Notable clients ==
Zenovka has choreographed routines for:

- (Russia) Evgenia Kanaeva
- (Russia) Daria Dmitrieva
- (Russia) Margarita Mamun
- (Russia) Dina Averina
- (Russia) Arina Averina
- (Azerbaijan) Aliya Garayeva
- (Japan) Sakura Hayakawa
- (Japan) Kaho Minagawa
- (United States) Jasmine Kerber
- (Greece) Varvara Filiou
- (South Korea) Son Yeon-Jae
- (United States) Laura Zeng
- (Japan) Sumire Kita
- (Russia) (Bulgaria) Elvira Krasnobaeva
- (Italy) Sofia Raffaeli
