= Hiromi =

Hiromi may refer to:

- Hiromi, Ehime, city in Shikoku, Japan
- Hiromi (given name), unisex Japanese given name (including a list of persons with the name)
- Hiromi (comedian), Japanese comedian
- Hiromi (model), Japanese fashion model
- Meitetsu Hiromi Line, railway in Japan
- "Hiromi" (song), 2007 single by Jun Shibata
- Hiromi Uehara, Japanese pianist

== See also ==
- Hiroomi, a masculine Japanese given name
