= Talisa Torretti =

Italian rhythmic gymnast

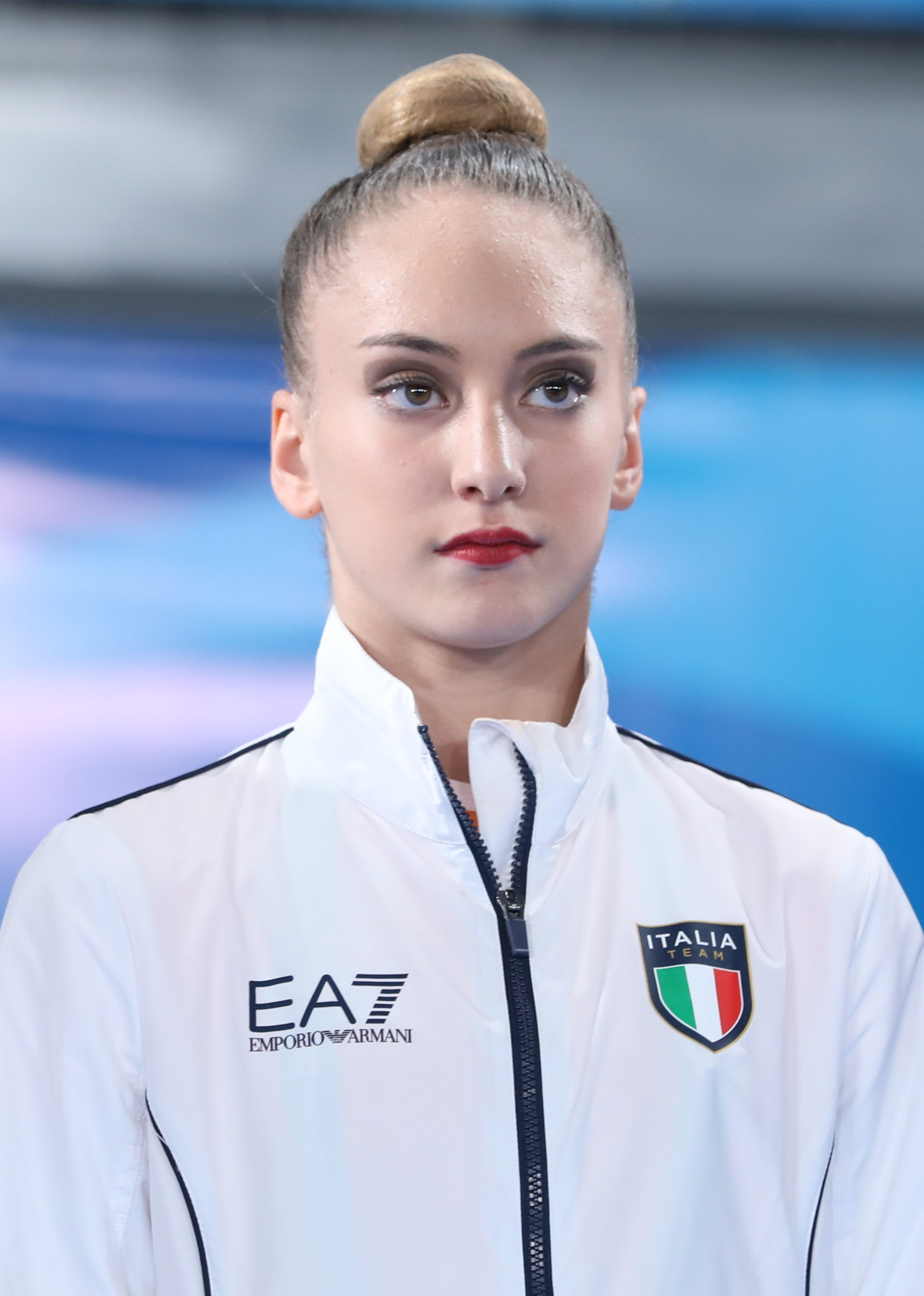
- Talisa Torretti at the 2018 Summer Youth Olympics

Personal information
- Full name: Talisa Torretti
- Born: January 25, 2003 (age 23) Fabriano, Italy

Gymnastics career
- Discipline: Rhythmic gymnastics
- Country represented: Italy; (2017-2020)
- Club: Faber Ginnastica Fabriano
- Head coach: Julieta Cantaluppi
- Choreographer: Byliana Dyakova
Medal record
Rhythmic Gymnastics
Representing Italy
Youth Olympic Games
Bronze medal – third place	2018 Buenos Aires	All-around
Junior European Championships
Silver medal – second place	2017 Budapest	10 Clubs
Bronze medal – third place	2018 Guadalajara	Ribbon
Representing (International Olympic Committee) Mixed-NOCs
Youth Olympic Games
Gold medal – first place	2018 Buenos Aires	Mixed team

Talisa Torretti, born 25 January 2003 in Fabriano, Italy) is an Italian individual rhythmic gymnast. She is the 2018 European Junior Ribbon bronze medalist and the 2018 Youth Olympic Games individual all-around bronze medalist.

== Career ==
=== Junior ===
She first appeared in Italian National team in 2017, when she was a member of a junior group which competed at the 2017 Junior European Championships in Budapest, Hungary and won silver medal in 10 Clubs final. A year later, she returned to individual competition and represented Italy at the 2018 Junior European Championships in Guadalajara, Spain. She and her teammates Eva Swahili Gherardi and Sofia Raffaeli took 4th place in Team competition. Talisa also qualified to two Apparatus finals, taking 6th place with Hoop and winning bronze medal with Ribbon. As the most successful Italian junior that year, she was selected to represent Italy at the 2018 Youth Olympic Games in Buenos Aires, Argentina. She placed second after Russian Daria Trubnikova in Individual Qualifications and then took bronze medal in Individual Final, after Ukrainian Khrystyna Pohranychna. She also won gold medal in Mixed Team competition.

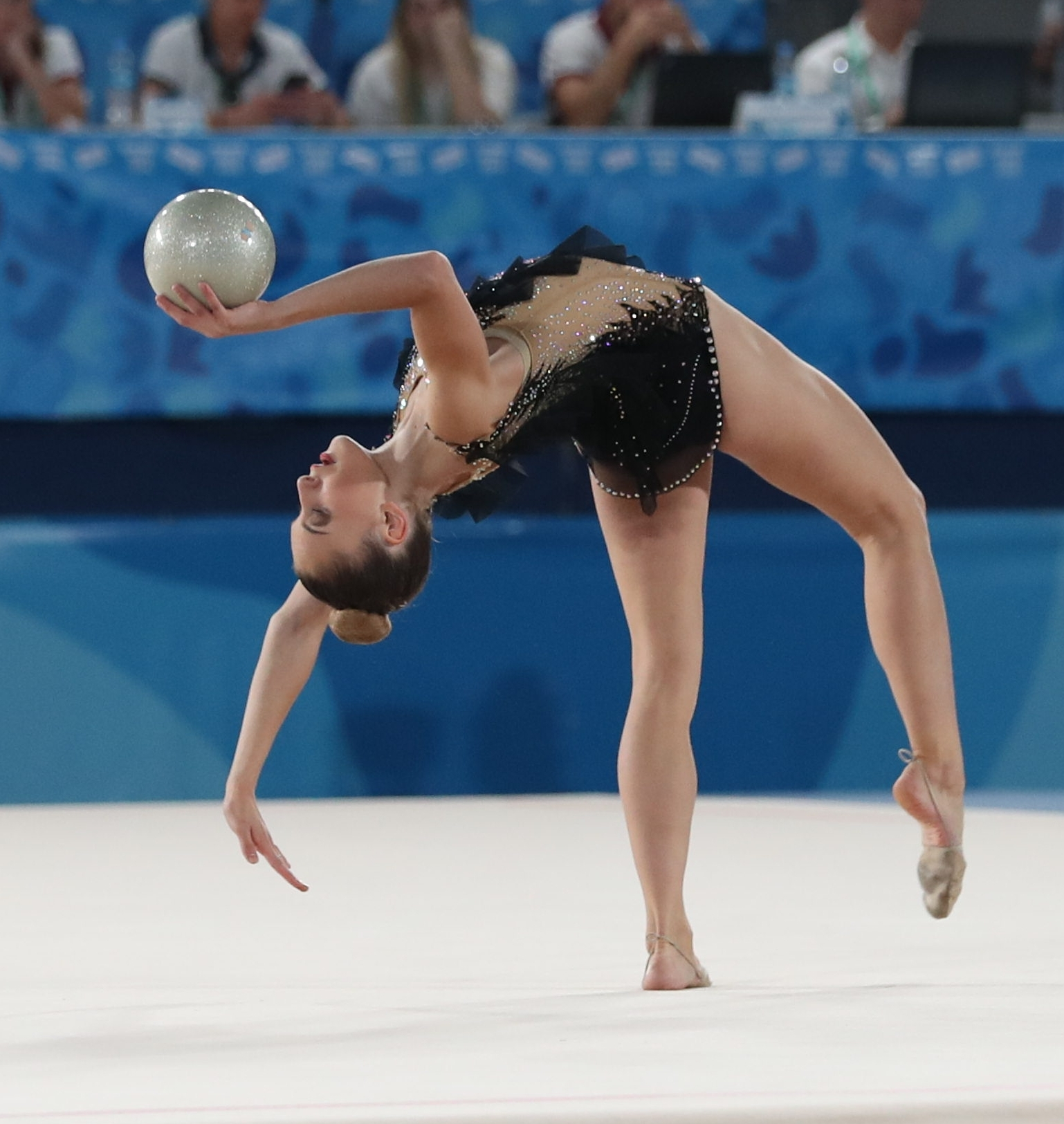
Talisa Torretti on ball

=== Senior ===
In 2019, she started competing in Senior category. She competed at the 2019 Italian National Championships and took 5th place in All-around. She also qualified to Hoop final and finished on 6th place. In 2020, she started competing as a member of the Italian National reserve group.

In 2024, she won Italian club championships Serie A, which was her last competition. Since then, she works as a coach at her club Faber Ginnastica Fabriano.

== Routine music information ==
Year	Apparatus	Music title
2018	Hoop	Another Day of Sun from La La Land
2018	Ball	Steppe by René Aubry
2018	Clubs	The Hut On Fowl's Legs by Berlin Philharmonic, Herbert Von Karajan
2018	Ribbon	Me Cago En El Amor by Tonino Carotone

== See also ==
- List of medalists at the Rhythmic Gymnastics Junior European Championships
