= Italian Rhythmic Gymnastics Championships =

Annual rhythmic gymnastics

The Italian Rhythmic Gymnastics National Championship is an annual rhythmic gymnastics national competition in Italy.

== Italian Championships Medalists ==
All-around medalists
Year	Location	Gold	Silver	Bronze	Details
2013		Veronica Bertolini			
2014	Rimini	Veronica Bertolini	Alessia Russo	Federica Febbo	
2015		Veronica Bertolini	Alessia Russo	Letizia Cicconcelli	
2016		Veronica Bertolini	Letizia Cicconcelli	Alessia Russo	
2017	Arezzo	Veronica Bertolini	Alexandra Agiurgiuculese	Milena Baldassarri	
2018	Terranuova	Milena Baldassarri	Alexandra Agiurgiuculese	Alessia Russo	
2019	Turin	Alexandra Agiurgiuculese	Milena Baldassarri	Alessia Russo	
2020	Folgaria	Milena Baldassarri	Alexandra Agiurgiuculese	Sofia Raffaeli	
2021	Folgaria	Milena Baldassarri	Sofia Raffaeli	Alexandra Agiurgiuculese	
2022	Folgaria	Sofia Raffaeli	Milena Baldassarri	Sofia Maffeis	.
2023	Folgaria	Sofia Raffaeli	Milena Baldassarri	Viola Sella	.
2024	Folgaria	Sofia Raffaeli	Milena Baldassarri	Viola Sella	.
2025	Folgaria	Sofia Raffaeli	Tara Dragas	Enrica Paolini	
2026	Folgaria	Sofia Raffaeli	Tara Dragas	Viola Sella	
