= Alice Taglietti =

Italian rhythmic gymnast (born 2007)

- Full name: Alice Taglietti
- Born: 13 July 2007 (age 19) Brescia, Italy

Gymnastics career
- Discipline: Rhythmic gymnastics
- Country represented: Italy (2022–present)
- Club: Asd Light Blue
- Head coach: Sara Menassi
- Assistant coach: Mara Alberti
- Former coach: Stefania Fogliata
Medal record
Representing Italy
Rhythmic Gymnastics
European Championships
Gold medal – first place	2025 Tallinn	Team

Alice Taglietti (born 13 June 2007) is an Italian rhythmic gymnast. On national level, she is a two-time (2020, 2021) Italian National champion in junior category.

== Career ==
Alice took up rhythmic gymnastics at the age of seven in Molinetto, Italy.

=== Junior ===
In 2021, she participated in International tournament Sofia Cup in the Bulgarian capital, where she took bronze medal in All-around and gold medals in ball and clubs finals.

In 2022, she competed at Irina Deleanu Cup in Romania and took 6th place in All-around. In June, Alice was selected to represent Italy, along with Tara Dragas, at the Junior European Championships in Tel Aviv, and took 5th place in Team competition. She also qualified to Clubs final and ended on 8th place. However, she subsequently temporarily interrupted her competitive activity following allegations of abuse against her former coach, Stefania Fogliata, which led to a legal investigation and a two-year suspended sentence for the coach.

=== Senior ===
In 2023, after a period away from competition, she resumed training at Light Blue club in Brescia, under the guidance of coaches Sara Menassi and Mara Alberti. With a renewed and supportive training environment, she progressively regained her form. At the end of 2024, she won her fourth Italian Gold title in the senior category and was once again called up to the national team.

In 2025, she returned to international competitions. In March, she competed at Aphrodite Cup in Athens, Greece and won silver medal in All-around, gold in Ball and Clubs and bronze in Hoop final. On April 25-27, she made her World Cup debut at World Cup Tashkent, where she took 17th place in All-around. She qualified to ball final and ended on 6th place. In June, Alice was selected to represent Italy, along with Tara Dragas and Sofia Raffaeli, at the 2025 European Championships in Tallinn - her first senior European Championships. Together with senior group they won gold medal in team competition. Alice performed only with ball, placing 11th in qualifications. On 14 June, she competed at the 2025 Italian National Championships and finished on 9th place in all-around due to mistakes in her hoop and ribbon routines.

In 2026, she competed at World Cup Tashkent and took 23rd place in all-around. In June, Alice competed at the 2026 Italian National Championships and took 10th place in all-around due to mistakes in three out of four routines. She qualified to hoop final only, finishing 5th.

== Routine music information ==
Year	Apparatus	Music title
2026	Hoop	Felicità by Damiano David
2026	Ball	Starfall by Marc Hanania
2026	Clubs	Hold On by Belle Sisoski
2026	Ribbon	Everybody Supports Women by Sofia Isella
2025	Hoop	Felicità by Damiano David
2025	Ball	Deja Vu by Ilya Beshevli
2025	Clubs	Hold On by Belle Sisoski
2025	Ribbon	Creep by Santi Francesi
2024	Hoop	
2024	Ball	Deja Vu by Ilya Beshevli
2024	Clubs	Running Up That Hill (A Deal With God) by Kate Bush
2024	Ribbon	Creep by Santi Francesi
2023	Hoop	Darkness of Light The Untold by Secession Studios
2023	Ball	Sally (L'altra metá del cielo) by Vasco Rossi
2023	Clubs	Running Up That Hill (A Deal With God) by Kate Bush
2023	Ribbon	
2022	Hoop	Another One Bites the Dust (Remix) by Queen
2022	Ball	Experience by Ludovico Einaudi, Daniel Hope, I Virtuosi Italiani
2022	Clubs	Mind Heist by Zack Hemsey
2022	Ribbon	Requiem in D minor, K.626: Sequence No. 6: Lacrimosa dies illa by Rundfunk-Sinfonieorchester Berlin
2020-21	Hoop	Another One Bites the Dust (Remix) by Queen
2020-21	Ball	Arrival of the Birds (The Crimson Wing) by The Cinematic Orchestra
2020-21	Clubs	Le Carnaval des Animaux, No.7 Aquarium by Saint Saens, TPRMX
2020-21	Ribbon	Requiem in D minor, K.626: Sequence No. 6: Lacrimosa dies illa by Rundfunk-Sinfonieorchester Berlin
2019	Ball	Time To Say Goodbye (piano version)
2018	Rope	Blue (Da Ba Dee) by Eiffel 65
2018	Ball	Love Theme (From Cinema Paradiso) piano version by Paul Lang
2018	Ribbon	Only Time by Enya
