= Mariela Pashalieva =

Bulgarian rhythmic gymnast (born 1970)

- Мариела Пашалиева
- Born: 11 August 1970 (age 56)

Gymnastics career
- Discipline: Rhythmic gymnastics
- Country represented: Bulgaria (1981-1988)
- Club: CSKA Sofia
- Head coach: Neshka Robeva
- Retired: yes
Medal record
Rhythmic Gymnastics
Representing Bulgaria
European Championships
Gold medal – first place	1988 Helsinki	Group All-Around
Gold medal – first place	1988 Helsinki	6 Balls
Gold medal – first place	1988 Helsinki	3 Hoops + 3 Ribbons
Junior European Championships
Gold medal – first place	1987 Athens	Ball
Bronze medal – third place	1987 Athens	All-Around

Mariela Pashalieva (Bulgarian: Мариела Пашалиева; born 11 August 1970) is a Bulgarian retired rhythmic gymnast and coach.

== Biography ==
Pashalieva took up the sport at age 7. At the age of 11 she entered the national junior team.

In 1987 she made her European Championships debut in Athens, winning bronze in the All-Around and gold with ball (tied with Elizabeth Koleva and Larissa Medvedeva).

At the 1988 European Championships in Helsinki she was part of the group that won gold in the All-Around, with 6 balls and with 3 hoops & 3 ribbons.

After her retirement she studied at the National Sports Academy "Vassil Levski", in 1993 she started working as a coach at the Iliana Sports Club.

In 2004 she received an invitation to be part of the national team's coaching staff, working with coaches Lilia Ignatova, Adriana Dunavska and Iliana Raeva. Under her guidance the Bulgarian group won various European, World Championships and World Cup medals as well as two Olympic Games' finals.

In 2014 she was hired by the Swiss federation to coach the national group, she would held that position until 2017.

In late April 2025 it was announced that the Italian federation chose Pashalieva to be the new coach of the senior group, replacing Emanuela Maccarani who was accused of abuse. However, in October 2025, Pashalieva announced her resignation from the Italian national team for personal reasons following the death of her father.
