= Emanuela Maccarani =

Italian rhythmic gymnastics coach

- Born: 20 September 1966 (age 59); Milan, Italy
- Citizenship: Italian
- Occupation: Rhythmic gymnastics coach
- Years active: 1992-present

Emanuela Maccarani (born 20 September 1966) is an Italian rhythmic gymnastics coach. She served as head coach of the Italian national rhythmic gymnastics team from 1996 to 2025. For her contribution to Italian gymnastics she has received the honor of Officer of the Order of Merit of the Italian Republic.

== Personal life ==
In 2012, she married Moreno Buccianti, from Follonica, football coach at the Seleção Sacerdoti Calcio.

== Biography ==
She is a former rhythmic gymnast, who was part of national group from 1982 to 1984, and competed at the 1983 World Championships in Strasbourg, two European Championships (in Stavanger and Vienna) and two World Cups.

In 1987 she began her coaching career, after retiring from the sport. She trained private teams but also became part of the technical staff of the National team as an assistant coach. Later, she became the head coach of the junior team, winning two bronze medals at the 1996 European Championships in Oslo.

Since 1996, she has been the head coach of the Italian rhythmic gymnastics national team and made her debut at the 1998 World Championships in Seville. The first medals came at the European Championships in Riesa (two bronze medals) and since then the national group has won many medals including the Olympic silver in Athens 2004, and three bronze medals - London 2012, Tokyo 2020 and Paris 2024. She is the most decorated Italian coach ever. Some of her notable trainees include Alessia Maurelli, Elisa Blanchi, Elisa Santoni, Marta Pagnini, Martina Centofanti, Agnese Duranti and others.

In 2022, she was accused of abuse by several athletes following an investigation published by the newspaper la Repubblica. After being acquitted in the 2023 sports trial, she was sent to trial again for mistreatment in March 2025. In the same month, after nearly three decades as head coach and technical director, her contract was terminated by the Italian Gymnastics Federation (FGI). The decision was made unanimously by the federal council and marked the end of her long tenure.

== Notable awards ==
=== Olympic Games ===
- (silver) Silver medal at the 2004 Olympic Games in Athens
- (bronze) Bronze medal at the 2012 Olympic Games in London
- (bronze) Bronze medal at the 2020 Olympic Games in Tokyo
- (bronze) Bronze medal at the 2024 Olympic Games in Paris

=== World championships ===
- (bronze) (bronze) 2 Bronze medals at the 2003 World Championships in Budapest
- (gold) (silver) (silver) Gold and 2 Silver medals at the 2005 World Championships in Baku
- (silver) (silver) (silver) 3 Silver medals at the 2007 World Championships in Patras
- (gold) (gold) (silver) 2 Gold and Silver medal at the 2009 World Championships in Ise
- (gold) (silver) (silver) Gold and 2 Silver medals at the 2010 World Championships in Moscow
- (gold) (silver) (silver) Gold and 2 Silver medals at the 2011 World Championships in Montpellier
- (silver) (silver) 2 Silver medals at the 2013 World Championships in Kyiv
- (silver) Silver medal at the 2014 World Championships in İzmir
- (gold) (silver) Gold and Silver medal at the 2015 World Championships in Stuttgart
- (gold) Gold medal at the 2017 World Championships in Pesaro
- (gold) (silver) (bronze) Gold, Silver and Bronze medal at the 2018 World Championships in Sofia

=== European championships ===
- (bronze) (bronze) 2 Bronze medals at the 2003 European Championships in Riesa
- (silver) (silver) (bronze) 2 Silver and 1 Bronze medal at the 2006 European Championships in Moscow
- (gold) (silver) (bronze) Gold, Silver and Bronze medal at the 2008 European Championships in Turin
- (silver) (bronze) Silver and Bronze medal at the 2012 European Championships in Nizhny Novgorod
- (silver) Silver medal at the 2014 European Championships in Baku
- (gold) (silver) (silver) Gold and 2 Silver medals at the 2018 European Championships in Guadalajara
