= Sofia Raffaeli =

Italian rhythmic gymnast

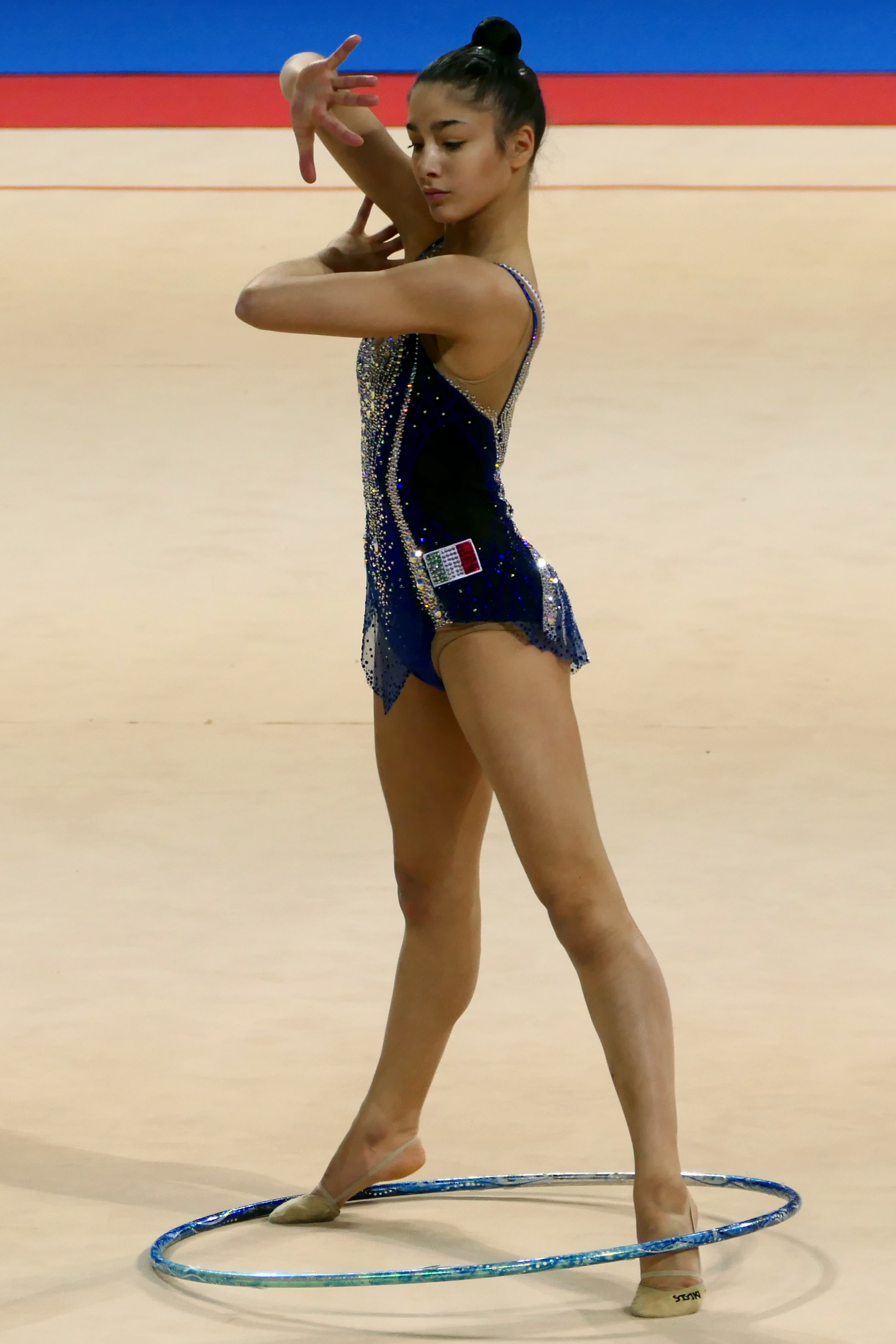
- Raffaeli in 2024

Personal information
- Nicknames: Sofi, Atomic Ant, Chiaravalle Vulcano
- Born: 19 January 2004 (age 22) Chiaravalle, Marche, Italy
- Height: 160 cm (5 ft 3 in)

Gymnastics career
- Discipline: Rhythmic gymnastics
- Country represented: Italy; (2017–present)
- Club: Faber Ginnastica Fabriano, Fiamme Oro
- Head coach: Amina Zaripova (since 2025)
- Former coaches: Claudia Mancinelli (2023-2025), Julieta Cantaluppi, Kristina Ghiurova (2011-2023)
- Choreographer: Bilyana Dyakova (2011-2024), Irina Zenovka (since 2025)
- Eponymous skills: The Raffaeli: side split pivot without help, trunk side at horizontal on relevé with free leg bent
- World ranking: 7 WC (2021) 1 WC (2022) 1 WC (2023) 2 WC (2024) 4 WC
Medal record
Rhythmic Gymnastics
Representing Italy
Event	1st	2nd	3rd
Olympic Games	0	0	1
World Championships	6	5	6
World Games	1	2	0
European Championships	6	7	2
FIG World Cup	23	26	11
FIG World Challenge Cup	7	1	3
Grand Prix Final	5	4	4
European Cup	3	3	3
Junior World Championships	0	3	0
Total	51	51	30
Olympic Games
Bronze medal – third place	2024 Paris	All-Around
World Championships
Gold medal – first place	2022 Sofia	All-Around
Gold medal – first place	2022 Sofia	Hoop
Gold medal – first place	2022 Sofia	Ball
Gold medal – first place	2022 Sofia	Ribbon
Gold medal – first place	2022 Sofia	Team
Gold medal – first place	2025 Rio de Janeiro	Hoop
Silver medal – second place	2021 Kitakyushu	Team
Silver medal – second place	2023 Valencia	All-around
Silver medal – second place	2023 Valencia	Hoop
Silver medal – second place	2023 Valencia	Ball
Silver medal – second place	2026 Frankfurt	Hoop
Bronze medal – third place	2021 Kitakyushu	Hoop
Bronze medal – third place	2022 Sofia	Clubs
Bronze medal – third place	2023 Valencia	Team
Bronze medal – third place	2025 Rio de Janeiro	All-Around
Bronze medal – third place	2025 Rio de Janeiro	Ball
Bronze medal – third place	2026 Frankfurt	All-Around
European Championships
Gold medal – first place	2022 Tel Aviv	Hoop
Gold medal – first place	2022 Tel Aviv	Clubs
Gold medal – first place	2023 Baku	Ball
Gold medal – first place	2023 Baku	Clubs
Gold medal – first place	2024 Budapest	Ball
Gold medal – first place	2025 Tallinn	Team
Silver medal – second place	2022 Tel Aviv	Ball
Silver medal – second place	2022 Tel Aviv	Team
Silver medal – second place	2023 Baku	All-Around
Silver medal – second place	2024 Budapest	Ribbon
Silver medal – second place	2024 Budapest	All-around
Silver medal – second place	2024 Budapest	Team
Silver medal – second place	2025 Tallinn	Hoop
Bronze medal – third place	2025 Tallinn	Clubs
Bronze medal – third place	2026 Varna	Hoop
World Games
Gold medal – first place	2022 Birmingham	Clubs
Silver medal – second place	2022 Birmingham	Hoop
Silver medal – second place	2022 Birmingham	Ball
European Cup
Gold medal – first place	2024 Baku	Hoop
Gold medal – first place	2025 Baku	Ball
Gold medal – first place	2025 Baku	Cross Battle
Silver medal – second place	2024 Baku	Cross Battle
Silver medal – second place	2024 Baku	Clubs
Silver medal – second place	2026 Baku	Ball
Bronze medal – third place	2024 Baku	Ribbon
Bronze medal – third place	2026 Baku	Clubs
Bronze medal – third place	2026 Baku	Cross Battle
Junior World Championships
Silver medal – second place	2019 Moscow	Team
Silver medal – second place	2019 Moscow	Rope
Silver medal – second place	2019 Moscow	Clubs

Sofia Raffaeli (born 19 January 2004) is an Italian individual rhythmic gymnast. She is the 2024 Olympic bronze medalist, the 2022 World all-around, hoop, ball, ribbon and team champion, the 2023 World all-around, hoop and ball silver medalist, the 2025 World all-around bronze medalist and a two-time (2023, 2024) European silver all-around medalist. She is the first Italian individual rhythmic gymnast to win a gold medal at the World Championships, European Championships and World Games, and she has won seven all-around gold medals in the FIG World Cup circuit. She is the first Italian individual rhythmic gymnast to win a medal at the Olympic Games.

At the national level, she is a five-time (2022–2026) Italian National all-around champion, the 2021 Italian National all-around silver medalist, and the 2020 Italian National all-around bronze medalist. As of 2025, she is the most decorated individual rhythmic gymnast from the Italian Gymnastics Federation.

== Personal life ==
Raffaeli was born in Chiaravalle, Marche, Italy. Her mother, Milena Martarelli, is an engineer at the University of Ancona, while her father, Gianni Raffaeli, is an architect. She has a younger brother, Pietro Raffaeli, who is a fencer. Raffaeli got involved in artistic gymnastics at the age of three, and she switched to rhythmic gymnastics four years later.

In 2021, she joined the Sports Group of the Fiamme Oro.

At Gazzetta Sports Awards 2023 (Oscars of Sports), Raffaeli was named the Best Female Athlete of the year alongside the Olympic, World and continental higher jumper champion Gianmarco Tamberi, who was the best male of the year. This made her the first-ever Italian rhythmic gymnast to win this award.

== Career ==
=== Junior ===
==== 2018 ====
She represented Italy at the 2018 Junior European Championships in Guadalajara, Spain, where she qualified to the clubs final and finished in 5th place. She and her teammates Eva Swahili Gherardi, Anna Paola Cantatore and Talisa Torretti took 4th place in the team competition.

==== 2019 ====
In 2019, she competed at the 2019 Junior World Championships in Moscow, Russia. She won three silver medals - team, rope and clubs. She also placed 8th in ball and 7th in ribbon.

=== Senior ===
==== 2020 ====
In 2020, Raffaeli officially made her senior debut at the 2020 Italian National Championships, where she won the bronze medal in the all-around behind Milena Baldassarri and Alexandra Agiurgiuculese. She also won a gold medal with clubs and a silver medal with ball.

==== 2021 ====
In the 2021 season, Raffaeli made her senior international debut at the 2021 FIG Rhythmic Gymnastics World Cup series. She finished 10th in the all-around behind Sabina Tashkenbaeva and qualified to two apparatus finals, where she won a silver medal with clubs and a bronze medal with ribbon. On 16–18 April Raffaeli competed at the 2021 Tashkent World Cup, where she finished 4th in the all-around behind Anastasiia Salos, and qualified to three apparatus finals, winning a silver medal with hoop and ribbon, and also placing 4th in clubs. In May, Raffaeli participated in the 2021 Pesaro World Cup, where she placed 8th in the all-round behind Laura Zeng. She qualified to two apparatus finals and placed 6th in clubs and 5th in ribbon.

In June, she won the silver medal in the all-around final at the 2021 Italian National Championships behind Milena Baldassarri and in front of Alexandra Agiurgiuculese. This championship decided the two gymnasts who were going to represent Italy at the Tokyo 2020 Olympic Games. Despite the fact that Raffaeli came second, the national coach, Emanuela Maccarani, decided that the gymnast accompanying Baldassarri should be Agiurgiuculese due to her experience throughout the Olympic cycle. Raffaeli also managed to enter all four apparatus finals, winning gold in clubs, silver in hoop, and bronze in ball and ribbon.

Raffaeli was then selected to compete at the 2021 Rhythmic Gymnastics European Championships in Varna, Bulgaria, along with Alexandra Agiurgiuculese. She qualified to the individual all-round final and the clubs final; she finished both finals in 8th place. At the 2021 Marbella Grand Prix Final, Raffaeli placed 4th all-around behind Anastasia Simakova, and she also placed first in clubs, third in ball and ribbon, and 7th in hoop. She was selected to represent Italy at the 2021 World Championships in Kitakyushu, Japan. At her senior world championships debut, she won a bronze medal in the hoop final. Raffaeli also made it into the individual all-around final, finishing in 6th place behind Viktoriia Onopriienko. She additionally won a silver medal in the team competition, together with Milena Baldassarri, Alexandra Agiurgiuculese, and the Italian group.

==== 2022: World champion ====
In the 2022 season, Raffaeli adapted to the new FIG code of points and became the top gymnast of the Italian national team.

Raffaeli competed at the 2022 World Cup Athens and won the gold medal in the all-around, in front of Daria Atamanov, becoming the first Italian individual rhythmic gymnast to win a gold medal in the all-around event of a FIG World Cup stage. She also qualified to three apparatus finals, winning two gold medals with ball and clubs, and a silver medal with hoop. On 8–10 April Raffaeli competed at the 2022 World Cup Sofia where she finished second in the all-around behind Boryana Kaleyn. She also won 3 silver medals with hoop, ball, clubs and she placed 6th in ribbon. On 22–24 April Raffaeli competed at the 2022 World Cup Baku where she won the second all-around title of her career ahead of Boryana Kaleyn and teammate Milena Baldassarri. She also won a gold medal with hoop and two bronze medals with ball and clubs, and she placed 5th in ribbon.

On 27–29 May Raffaeli competed at the 2022 Italian National Championships. She won the gold medal in the general all-around competition, and she also managed to win four gold medals in the apparatus finals, all in front of Milena Baldassarri. On 3–5 June Raffaeli competed at the 2022 World Cup Pesaro where she won the gold medal in the all around competition. On top of that, she won three gold medals in the hoop, ball and clubs final and a silver medal with the ribbon behind Viktoriia Onopriienko. With this, she won the all-around trophy of the World Cup circuit, and she also won the apparatus trophies with hoop, ball and clubs.

From 15 to 19 June Raffaeli competed at the 2022 European Championships in Tel Aviv, Israel. Although a poor performance in the individual final saw her left off the all-around podium, she won two gold medals and two silver medals in the hoop, clubs, ball and team final respectively. This made her the first Italian rhythmic gymnast to win a gold medal at the European Championships. On 12–13 July Raffaeli competed at the World Games 2022. She won the gold medal in the clubs final and two silver medals in the hoop and ball final. She was the first Italian rhythmic gymnast to win a gold medal at the World Games.

On 26–28 August Raffaeli competed at the 2022 World Challenge Cup Cluj-Napoca. She won the gold medal in the all around competition. She became the first Italian rhythmic gymnast to win an all-around gold medal at a World Challenge Cup. Additionally, she won two gold medals in the hoop and ribbon final and a bronze medal with clubs. From 14 to 18 September Raffaeli represented Italy at the World Championships in Sofia, Bulgaria, where she won five gold medals in the all-around, hoop, ball, ribbon and team competition, and a bronze medal in the clubs final. She was Italy's first all-around individual champion at the World Championships.

==== 2023: World silver medal ====
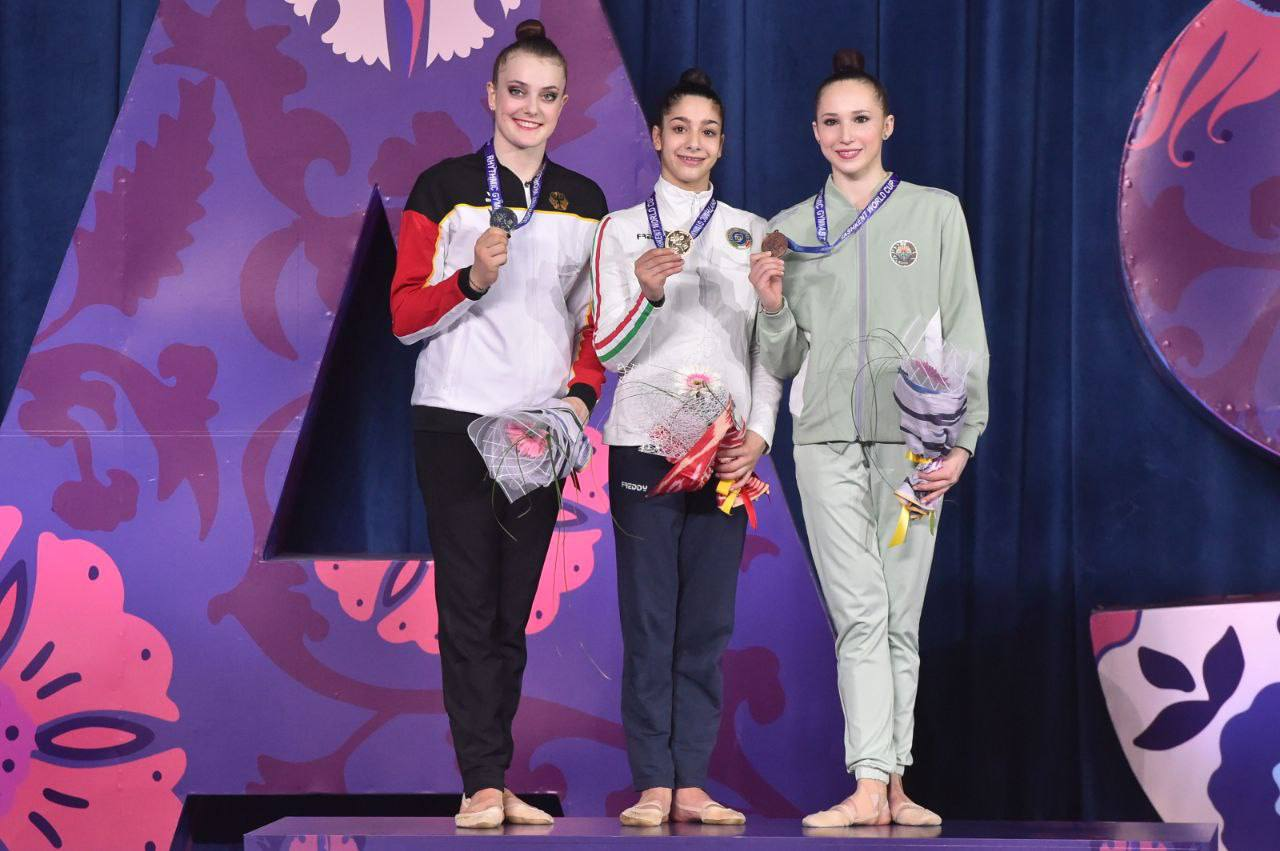
Raffaeli with Margarita Kolosov (left) and Takhmina Ikromova (right) at 2023 World Cup Tashkent

Raffaeli began her season by competing at the Grand Prix RG Marbella 2023, where she won a gold medal in the all-around and ribbon finals as well as a silver medal in the clubs final. On 18 March, Raffaeli competed at the 2023 World Cup Athens and won the gold medal in the all-around competition. She also won a gold medal in the hoop final and a silver medal in the ball final. On 1–2 April Raffaeli competed at the 2023 World Cup Sofia where she finished second in the all-around. She also won a silver medal with ball, and two bronze medals with hoop and clubs. On 15 April Raffaeli competed at the 2023 World Cup Tashkent and won five gold medals in the all-around, hoop, ball, clubs and ribbon final. The next week, she competed at the 2023 World Cup Baku and finished second in the all-around and hoop final.

From 18 to 21 May Raffaeli competed at the 2023 European Championships in Baku, Azerbaijan. She won the silver medal in the all-around final by just 0.05 points after making large improvements to her scores from qualifications. This made her the first Italian individual rhythmic gymnast to win a medal in the all-around final at the European Championships. In addition, she won two gold medals in the clubs and ball finals. On 10 June Raffaeli competed at the 2023 Italian National Championships. She won her second consecutive national title in the all-around competition. She also managed to win all the gold medals in the apparatus finals.

On 14–16 July Raffaeli competed at the 2023 World Challenge Cup Cluj-Napoca and won the gold medal in the all around competition. She won the gold medal in the hoop final and two bronze medals in the ball and clubs finals. On 21–23 July Raffaeli competed at the 2023 World Cup Milan, where she won the gold medal in the hoop final and two silver medals in the all-around and clubs final. With this, she also won the FIG World Cup series all-around and hoop trophy for the second year in a row.

Raffaeli was selected to compete at the 2023 Rhythmic Gymnastics World Championships, in Valencia, Spain, where she won three silver medals in the all-around, hoop and ball finals. She also contributed massively to the Italian team bronze. Throughout the World Championships, Raffaeli was seen training with a new coach, Claudia Mancinelli, and it was rumoured that she and her long-time coach Julieta Cantaluppi had some disagreements. In November, less than a year before the 2024 Summer Olympics, it was formally announced by the Italian and Israeli Gymnastics Federation that Julieta Cantaluppi was leaving Italy to pursuit other coaching opportunities in Israel.

==== 2024: Olympic bronze medal ====
Raffaeli began her season by competing at the 2024 World Cup Athens and won two silver medals with hoop and ball. On 12–14 April, Raffaeli, competed at the 2024 World Cup Sofia, where she finished fourth in the all-around. She also won a bronze medal with hoop and a gold medal with clubs. The next week, she competed at the 2024 World Cup Baku and finished third in the all-around. She also won a gold medal with clubs and a silver medal with hoop.

Raffaeli at the 2024 European Championships

On 3–5 May, Raffaeli competed at the 2024 European Cup Baku, where she won the silver medal in the all-around, a gold medal with hoop, a silver medal with clubs and a bronze medal with ribbon. From 23 to 26 May Raffaeli competed at the 2024 European Championships in Budapest, Hungary. She won the silver medal in the all-around final, the gold medal in the ball final and the silver medal in the ribbon final. She also won a silver medal in the team competition, together with Milena Baldassarri and the Italian group.

On 8 June Raffaeli competed at the 2024 Italian National Championships. She won her third consecutive national title in the all-around competition. She also managed to win three gold medals in the apparatus finals. She competed at the Milan World Cup at the end of June, where she won the silver medal in the all-around behind Darja Varfolomeev. In the apparatus finals, she won gold in ribbon and silver in the ball and clubs finals, and she took 7th place in the hoop final.

In August, Raffaeli competed at the 2024 Summer Olympics. She qualified for the final in first place and said, "It's a beautiful feeling to be leading after this first day, but I don't want to get too emotional. The real competition is tomorrow." In the final, she dropped the apparatus in her ball and ribbon routines but still finished with the bronze medal, earning Italy's first individual rhythmic gymnastics Olympic medal. She expressed regret that she had finished with mistakes in her last routine, ribbon, but also happiness for winning a medal.

In September, she participated in the Aeon Cup in Japan with Milena Baldassarri and Anna Piergentili. They won the bronze medal in the team competition, and Raffaeli won gold in the all-around.

==== 2025: World bronze medal ====
Raffaeli began her season in late February by competing for her club Fabriano during the first stage of the Italian Serie A1 club championship. She performed her new hoop routine and received the second highest score of the day, behind Varfolomeev, but her team only reached 7th place because of many mistakes in other girls' routines. The second stage was held on March 15, where Raffaeli performed her new clubs routine and helped her team Fabriano reach 3rd place.

At the Grand Prix Marbella in late March, she won the silver medal in the all-around behind Taiisia Onofriichuk. She also won a gold medal in the hoop and ribbon final and a silver medal in the clubs final. On 4-6 April, she competed at Sofia World Cup, where she made mistakes in three of her four routines in the all-around and took 11th place. She only qualified for the hoop final, where she won the bronze medal. On April 18-20, she competed at the Baku World Cup and won the gold medal in the all-around in front of Taisiia Onofriichuk and Stiliana Nikolova.

In early May, Raffaeli competed at the European Cup being held in Baku. In the cross battle, she won gold ahead of Lola Djuraeva and Taisiia Onofriichuk, and she also won a gold medal in the ball final. Sofia was selected to represent Italy, along with Tara Dragas and Alice Taglietti, at the 2025 European Championships in Tallinn. Together with the senior group, they won the gold medal in the team competition. She finished in 4th place in the all-around final, 0.2 points away from podium. She competed in all four appartus finals the next day and won a silver medal with hoop and bronze with clubs. On 14 June, she competed at the 2025 Italian National Championships and won her fourth consecutive national title in the all-around competition. In a tight race with Tara Dragas, she won by 0.35 points. She won gold medals in the hoop and ball finals and silver with clubs and ribbon.

On 30 June, it was announced that her coach, Claudia Mancinelli, would be leaving to become the head of the Territorial Activity Center in Rome, and that Raffaeli would be moving to the national training center in Desio to train. In July, she won gold medal in all-around at Milan World Cup, the gold medal in hoop final and the silver medal in clubs final. A couple days later, Raffaeli competed at the World Challenge Cup Cluj-Napoca, where she took 4th place in the AA due to some mistakes in her clubs routine. She qualified to all finals except for clubs, and she placed 4th with hoop, 8th in ball due to two large risk errors and 5th in ribbon in which she ended without her ribbon right at the end of a well executed routine.

Raffaeli was selected to represent Italy alongside Tara Dragas and the Italian group at the 2025 World Championships, held in Rio de Janeiro, Brazil. She took 4th place in all-around qualifications and qualified to three apparatus finals. She performed her routines well in the all-around final and won the bronze medal behind Darja Varfolomeev and Stiliana Nikolova. Raffaeli said afterward, "I am very pleased with this final. I won the bronze medal and I am very proud of it." Together with Tara Dragas and the Italian senior group, she took 6th place in the team competition. She also won a gold medal in hoop, which she dedicated to Italian artistic gymnast Lorenzo Bonicelli, who was severely injured at the 2025 Summer World University Games, and a bronze medal in ball. In the clubs final, she finished 5th.

In December, she began to be coached by Amina Zaripova, the new coach of her gymnastics club.

==== 2026: World bronze medal ====
In January, Raffaeli went to a two-week camp in Novogorsk, Russia, along with teammates Anna Piergentili and Veronica Zappaterreni, to train with Russian specialists and to work on choreography with Irina Zenovka; the trip was endorsed by the Italian Gymnastics Federation. The choice to train there was controversial and drew criticism due to the ongoing Russian War in Ukraine.

Raffaeli began her 2026 season by competing at the Miss Valentine Grand Prix in Tartu in late February, where she won the bronze medal in the all-around and ball final. On 21-22 March, Raffaeli competed at Grand Prix Marbella, where she took 5th place in the all-around and won a silver medal in the clubs final. On 29-30 March, Raffaeli competed at the Sofia World Cup, where she finished third in the all-around. She competed in all four apparatus finals the next day and won bronze medals with hoop and ball as well as a silver medal with clubs. On 17-19 April, she competed at the Baku World Cup and took 6th place in the all-around. She competed in three apparatus finals the next day and won two silver medals with ball and ribbon.

In early May, Raffaeli competed at the European Cup being held in Baku. In the cross battle she won the bronze medal, and she also won a silver medal in the ball final and a bronze medal in the clubs final. On 15-17 May, she competed at the 2026 World Challenge Cup Portimao and won the gold medal in the all-around, hoop final and silver in the ball final. She also qualified for but withdrew from the clubs and ribbon finals due to a minor muscle strain; her coaching team decided to withdraw her to avoid any risk of injuries ahead of the European Championship.

At the end of May, she represented Italy at the 2026 European Championships in Varna, Bulgaria, alongside Tara Dragas. She took 8th place in the all-around final and 6th place in the team competition together with the senior group. She won bronze in the hoop final and finished in 7th place with ribbon and 8th with clubs.

In June, she competed at Italian National Championships and won the gold medal in the all-around for the fifth consecutive year, becoming the only Italian gymnast beside Veronica Bertolini to achieve this. She also won gold medals in the hoop and clubs finals and silver in ball, and she took 5th place with ribbon. In July, she competed at Milan World Cup and won silver medal in all-around. She also won gold medal in hoop final and took 4th place in ball, clubs and ribbon.

In August, she was selected to represent Italy at the 2026 World Championships in Frankfurt, Germany. She took 5th place in all-around qualifications after mistakes in her clubs and ribbon routines. She took 6th place in the team competition alongside Tara Dragas and the senior group. In the all-around final, she won bronze 0.05 points behind Stiliana Nikolova; this meant she also won Italy an Olympic quota for the 2028 Olympic Games. In the apparatus finals, she won silver in the hoop final behind Taisiia Onofriichuk and ahead of Darja Varfolomeev, and she finished 5th place in the ball final.

Afterwards, it was announced that she was planning to undergo arthroscopic knee surgery, which had been scheduled for after the World Championships.

== Eponymous skill ==
Raffaeli performing a turn in penché followed by her eponymous turn

Raffaeli has one eponymous skill listed in the code of points, a 180 degree turn in a side split position on relevé with the free leg bent. It was added to the code in 2021. She is the second Italian rhythmic gymnast to have an eponymous skill after Alexandra Agiurgiuculese.

Name	Description	Difficulty (Note: Valid for the 2022-2024 Code of Points)
Raffaeli	Side split with or without help, trunk horizontal with free bent leg	0.5 base value

== Detailed Olympic results ==
Year	Competition Description	Location	Music	Apparatus	Rank-Final	Score-Final	Rank-Qualifying	Score-Qualifying
2024	Olympics	Paris		All-around	3rd	136.300	1st	139.100
2024	Olympics	Paris	Rescue by Lauren Daigle	Hoop	4th	35.250	1st	35.700
2024	Olympics	Paris	Bella ci dormi by Maria Mazzotta and Pulcinella	Ball	6th	32.900	5th	34.450
2024	Olympics	Paris	Dark Mirror by Power-Haus, Christian Reindl and Lucie Paradis	Clubs	2nd	35.900	2nd	35.000
2024	Olympics	Paris	Vesoul by Mouron and Terry Truck	Ribbon	7th	32.350	1st	33.950

== Achievements ==
- She is the first and only Italian individual gymnast to have won a medal at a Junior World Rhythmic Gymnastics Championships.
- She is the first and only Italian individual gymnast to have won a gold medal in the all-around competition at a World Cup.
- She is the first and only Italian gymnast to have won the entire World Cup circuit in the general competition, hoop, ball and clubs specialties.
- She is the first and only Italian individual gymnast to have won a medal at a Rhythmic Gymnastics European Championships.
- She is the first and only Italian individual gymnast to have won a gold medal at a Rhythmic Gymnastics European Championships.
- She is the first and only Italian individual gymnast to have won a gold medal at a Rhythmic Gymnastics World Championships.
- She is the first and only Italian individual gymnast to have won a gold medal in the all around at a Rhythmic Gymnastics World Championships.
- She is the first and only Italian individual gymnast to have won 5 out of 5 golds (all-around, hoop, ball, clubs and ribbon) in a World Cup.
- She is the first and only Italian individual gymnast to have won a medal in the all around at a Rhythmic Gymnastics European Championships.
- She is the first and only Italian individual rhythmic gymnast to win a gold medal at the European Cup.
- She is the first and only Italian individual rhythmic gymnast to win a medal at Olympic Games.
- She is the first and only Italian individual rhythmic gymnast to win the cross battles title at the European Cup.

== Routine music information ==
Year	Apparatus	Music title
2026	Hoop	Whip by Arca / Seep by William Morris (Kings & Creatures)
2026	Ball (first)	Chopin: 24 Préludes, Op. 28: No. 4 in E Minor. Largo by Maurizio Pollini / Jane B. by Jane Birkin
2026	Ball (second)	Chopin: 24 Préludes, Op. 28: No. 4 in E Minor. Largo by Maurizio Pollini / How insensitive by Lyn Stanley and Tamir Hendelman
2026	Ball (third)	The Double Theme - Version 1 / Main Title (The Flight Attendant) by Blake Neely
2026	Clubs	Prelude to Caravan by Paddy Milner / N.E.W. by Hiromi, Tomoaki Baba & Shun Ishiwaka
2026	Ribbon	La canzone dei vecchi amanti by Delia Buglisi
2025	Hoop	Tu si' na cosa grande by Domenico Modugno
2025	Ball	Making Christmas Remix (from The Nightmare Before Christmas) Pentatonix & The Citizens of Halloween
2025	Clubs	'Cu Ti Lu Dissi by Redi Hasa & Maria Mazzotta
2025	Ribbon	El Tango De Roxanne by Roxane Del
2024	Hoop	Rescue by Lauren Daigle
2024	Ball	Bella ci dormi by Maria Mazzotta and Pulcinella
2024	Clubs	Dark Mirror by Power-Haus, Christian Reindl and Lucie Paradis
2024	Ribbon	Vesoul by Mouron and Terry Truck
2023	Hoop	Psycho Suite by Bernard Hermann and The Murder by Danny Elfman
2023	Ball	"Il mondo" by Jacopo Rossetto
2023	Clubs	Quand C’est by Stromae
2023	Ribbon	"That's Life" by Frank Sinatra
2022	Hoop	Vai Vedrai by Cirque du Soleil
2022	Ball	Nemesis by Benjamin Clementine
2022	Clubs	Call me Cruella by Florence + the Machine
2022	Ribbon (first)	Two Trains by Jan A. P. Kaczmarek
2022	Ribbon (second)	"Ladder Fight" (Xena: Warrior Princess (Original Television Soundtrack)) by Joseph LoDuca
2021	Hoop	Montagues & Capulets by Richard Clayderman, Bulgarian Symphony Orchestra, Deyan Pavlov
2021	Ball (first)	Oogie Boogie's Song" by Danny Elfman
2021	Ball (second)	The man with the harmonica Song by Ennio Morricone
2021	Clubs	Merry Christmas Mr Lawrence by Ryuichi Sakamoto
2021	Ribbon	"Tango de Amor" (The Addams Family OST) by Nathan Lane, Bebe Neuwirth
2020	Hoop	Dance of the Sugar Plum Fairy by Jennifer Thomas
2020	Ball	Oogie Boogie's Song by Danny Elfman
2020	Clubs (first)	Aha! by Imogen Heap
2020	Clubs (second)	Merry Christmas Mr Lawrence by Ryuichi Sakamoto
2020	Ribbon	"Tango de Amor" (The Addams Family OST) by Nathan Lane, Bebe Neuwirth
2019	Rope	"Far from Over by Frank Stallone, from Staying Alive's OST
2019	Ball	Amara Terra Mia by Ermal Meta
2019	Clubs	Money by Alan Cumming
2019	Ribbon	The Penguins of Madagascar by Lorne Balfe
2018	Hoop	"La foule" by Édith Piaf
2018	Ball	The Pink Panther Theme by The City of Prague Philharmonic Orchestra
2018	Clubs	Marajà by Vinicio Capossela
2018	Ribbon	The Penguins of Madagascar by Lorne Balfe

== Competitive highlights ==
(Team competitions in seniors are held only at the World Championships, Europeans and other Continental Games.)

International: Senior
Year	Event	AA	Team	Hoop	Ball	Clubs	Ribbon
2026	World Championships Frankfurt	3rd	6th	2nd	5th	26th (Q)	23rd (Q)
2026	World Cup Milan	2nd		1st	4th	4th	4th
2026	European Championships Varna	8th	6th	3rd	21th (Q)	8th	7th
2026	World Cup Challenge Portimao	1st		1st	2nd	WD	WD
2026	European Cup Baku	3rd		5th	2nd	3rd	8th
2026	World Cup Baku	6th		4th	2nd	9th (Q)	2nd
2026	World Cup Sofia	3rd		3rd	3rd	2nd	7th
2026	Grand Prix Marbella	5th		17th (Q)	9th (Q)	2nd	4th
2026	Grand Prix Tartu	3rd		6th	3rd	17th (Q)	4th
2025	World Championships Rio	3rd	6th	1st	3rd	5th	13th (Q)
2025	World Cup Challenge Cluj-Napoca	4th		4th	8th	14th (Q)	5th
2025	World Cup Milan	1st		1st	5th	2nd	5th
2025	European Championships Tallinn	4th	1st	2nd	5th	3rd	4th
2025	European Cup Baku	1st			1st		
2025	World Cup Baku	1st		5th	6th	4th	5th
2025	World Cup Sofia	11th		3rd	26th(Q)	9th (Q)	28th (Q)
2025	Grand Prix Marbella	2nd		1st	5th	2nd	1st
2024	Aeon Cup	1st	3rd				
2024	Olympic Games	3rd					
2024	World Cup Milan	2nd		7th	2nd	2nd	1st
2024	European Championships Budapest	2nd	2nd	8th	1st	6th	2nd
2024	European Cup Baku	2nd		1st	4th	2nd	3rd
2024	World Cup Baku	3rd		2nd	4th	1st	15th(Q)
2024	World Cup Sofia	4th		3rd	4th	1st	12th(Q)
2024	World Cup Athens	8th		2nd	2nd	11th (Q)	29th (Q)
2023	Aeon Cup	3rd	4th				
2023	World Championships Valencia	2nd	3rd	2nd	2nd	15th (Q)	4th
2023	World Cup Milan	2nd		1st	7th	2nd	8th
2023	World Challenge Cup Cluj-Napoca	1st		1st	3rd	3rd	6th
2023	European Championships Baku	2nd	4th	4th	1st	1st	29th (Q)
2023	World Cup Baku	2nd		2nd	7th	6th	14th (Q)
2023	World Cup Tashkent	1st		1st	1st	1st	1st
2023	World Cup Sofia	2nd		3rd	2nd	3rd	5th
2023	World Cup Athens	1st		1st	2nd	5th	5th
2023	Grand Prix Marbella	1st		4th	4th	2nd	1st
2022	Aeon Cup	1st	1st				
2022	World Championships Sofia	1st	1st	1st	1st	3rd	1st
2022	World Challenge Cup Cluj-Napoca	1st		1st	8th	3rd	1st
2022	World Games 2022			2nd	2nd	1st	11th (Q)
2022	European Championships Tel Aviv	4th	2nd	1st	2nd	1st	9th (Q)
2022	World Cup Pesaro	1st		1st	1st	1st	2nd
2022	World Cup Baku	1st		1st	3rd	3rd	5th
2022	World Cup Sofia	2nd		2nd	2nd	2nd	6th
2022	World Cup Athens	1st		2nd	1st	1st	14th (Q)
2021	World Championships Kitakyushu	6th	2nd	3rd		9th (Q)	16th (Q)
2021	Grand Prix Marbella	4th		7th	3rd	1st	3rd
2021	European Championships Varna	8th	6th	11th (Q)	9th (Q)	8th	39th (Q)
2021	World Cup Pesaro	8th		9th (Q)	19th (Q)	6th	5th
2021	World Cup Tashkent	4th		2nd	11th (Q)	4th	2nd
2021	World Cup Sofia	10th		29th (Q)	14th (Q)	2nd	3rd
International: Junior
Year	Event	AA	Team	Hoop/Rope	Ball	Clubs	Ribbon
2019	Junior World Championships		2nd	2nd	8th	2nd	7th
2018	Junior European Championships		4th	7th (Q)		5th	
National
Year	Event	AA	Team	Hoop	Ball	Clubs	Ribbon
2026	Italian National Championships	1st		1st	2nd	1st	5th
2025	Italian National Championships	1st		1st	1st	2nd	2nd
2024	Italian National Championships	1st		1st	1st	1st	6th
2023	Italian National Championships	1st		1st	1st	1st	1st
2022	Italian National Championships	1st		1st	1st	1st	1st
2021	Italian National Championships	2nd		2nd	3rd	1st	3rd
2020	Italian National Championships	3rd		4th	2nd	1st	17th (Q)
2019	Italian National Championships				3rd	3rd	4th
Q = Qualifications (Did not advance to Event Final due to the 2 gymnast per country rule, only Top 8 highest score); WR = World Record; WD = Withdrew; NT = No Team Competition; OC = Out of Competition(competed but scores not counted for qualifications/results)

== See also ==
- List of medalists at the Rhythmic Gymnastics World Championships
