= 2025 FIG Rhythmic Gymnastics World Cup series =

International gymnastics contest

FIG Rhythmic Gymnastics World Cup series
- Location: various — see locations
- Date: April 4 – July 27, 2025 see schedule

The 2025 FIG World Cup circuit in Rhythmic Gymnastics is a series of competitions officially organized and promoted by the International Gymnastics Federation.

The winners in the all-around at the World Cup series were Taisiia Onofriichuk and the group of China. Onofriichuk also won in hoop and ribbon, and Darja Varfolomeev won in ball and clubs. The group of China also won in the 5-ribbon, 3-ball, and 2-hoop events.

== Schedule ==
World Cup
Date	Event	Location	Type
April 04–06	FIG World Cup 2025	(Bulgaria) Sofia	Individuals and groups
April 18–20	FIG World Cup 2025	(Azerbaijan) Baku	Individuals and groups
April 25–27	FIG World Cup 2025	(Uzbekistan) Tashkent	Individuals and groups
July 18–20	FIG World Cup 2025	(Italy) Milan	Individuals and groups

World Challenge Cup
May 09–11	FIG World Challenge Cup 2025	(Portugal) Portimão	Individuals and groups
July 25–27	FIG World Challenge Cup 2025	(Romania) Cluj Napoca	Individuals and groups

== Medal winners ==
=== All-around ===
==== Individual ====
Competitions	Gold	Silver	Bronze
World Cup
Sofia	(Ukraine) Taisiia Onofriichuk	(Bulgaria) Stiliana Nikolova	(Uzbekistan) Takhmina Ikromova
Baku	(Italy) Sofia Raffaeli	(Ukraine) Taisiia Onofriichuk	(Bulgaria) Stiliana Nikolova
Tashkent	(Uzbekistan) Takhmina Ikromova	(Germany) Darja Varfolomeev	(Poland) Liliana Lewinska
Milan	(Italy) Sofia Raffaeli	(Germany) Darja Varfolomeev	(Ukraine) Taisiia Onofriichuk
World Challenge Cup
Portimão	(Individual Neutral Athletes) Alina Harnasko	(United States) Rin Keys	(Bulgaria) Eva Brezalieva
Cluj Napoca	(Germany) Darja Varfolomeev	(Ukraine) Taisiia Onofriichuk	(Israel) Meital Maayan Sumkin

==== Group ====
Competitions	Gold	Silver	Bronze
World Cup
Sofia	Spain	Japan	Poland
Baku	Bulgaria	China	Ukraine
Tashkent	Poland	Uzbekistan	China
Milan	Brazil	Japan	China
World Challenge Cup
Portimão	Brazil	Spain	France
Cluj Napoca	Spain	Poland	Israel

=== Apparatus ===
==== Hoop ====
Competitions	Gold	Silver	Bronze
World Cup
Sofia	(Bulgaria) Stiliana Nikolova	(Ukraine) Taisiia Onofriichuk	(Italy) Sofia Raffaeli
Baku	(Ukraine) Taisiia Onofriichuk	(Cyprus) Vera Tugolukova	(Individual Neutral Athletes) Anastasiia Salos
Tashkent	(Uzbekistan) Takhmina Ikromova	(Uzbekistan) Anastasiya Sarantseva	(Individual Neutral Athletes) Daria Grokhotova
Milan	(Italy) Sofia Raffaeli	(Ukraine) Taisiia Onofriichuk	(Bulgaria) Stiliana Nikolova
World Challenge Cup
Portimão	(Individual Neutral Athletes) Alina Harnasko	(Individual Neutral Athletes) Anastasiia Salos	(United States) Megan Chu
Cluj Napoca	(Israel) Meital Maayan Sumkin	(Germany) Darja Varfolomeev	(Poland) Liliana Lewinska

==== Ball ====
Competitions	Gold	Silver	Bronze
World Cup
Sofia	(Bulgaria) Stiliana Nikolova	(Individual Neutral Athletes) Alina Harnasko	(Uzbekistan) Takhmina Ikromova
Baku	(Cyprus) Vera Tugolukova	(Ukraine) Taisiia Onofriichuk	(Individual Neutral Athletes) Alina Harnasko
Tashkent	(Germany) Darja Varfolomeev	(Uzbekistan) Takhmina Ikromova	(Uzbekistan) Anastasiya Sarantseva
Milan	(Germany) Darja Varfolomeev	(Bulgaria) Stiliana Nikolova	(Italy) Tara Dragas
World Challenge Cup
Portimão	(Individual Neutral Athletes) Alina Harnasko	(United States) Rin Keys	(Germany) Viktoria Steinfeld
Cluj Napoca	(Germany) Darja Varfolomeev	(Ukraine) Taisiia Onofriichuk	(Italy) Tara Dragas

==== Clubs ====
Competitions	Gold	Silver	Bronze
World Cup
Sofia	(Ukraine) Taisiia Onofriichuk	(Uzbekistan) Takhmina Ikromova	(Bulgaria) Eva Brezalieva
Baku	(Germany) Darja Varfolomeev	(Bulgaria) Stiliana Nikolova	(Ukraine) Taisiia Onofriichuk
Tashkent	(Germany) Darja Varfolomeev	(Uzbekistan) Anastasiya Sarantseva	(Uzbekistan) Takhmina Ikromova
Milan	(Bulgaria) Stiliana Nikolova	(Italy) Sofia Raffaeli	(China) Wang Zilu
World Challenge Cup
Portimão	(Individual Neutral Athletes) Alina Harnasko	(United States) Rin Keys	(Spain) Lucía González
Cluj Napoca	(Ukraine) Taisiia Onofriichuk	(Italy) Tara Dragas	(Germany) Darja Varfolomeev

==== Ribbon ====
Competitions	Gold	Silver	Bronze
World Cup
Sofia	(Ukraine) Taisiia Onofriichuk	(Poland) Liliana Lewinska	(United States) Rin Keys
Baku	(Germany) Darja Varfolomeev	(Ukraine) Taisiia Onofriichuk	(Italy) Tara Dragas
Tashkent	(Germany) Darja Varfolomeev	(Uzbekistan) Takhmina Ikromova	(Germany) Anastasia Simakova
Milan	(Italy) Tara Dragas	(Ukraine) Taisiia Onofriichuk	(Cyprus) Vera Tugolukova
World Challenge Cup
Portimão	(Individual Neutral Athletes) Alina Harnasko	(Spain) Lucía González	(Individual Neutral Athletes) Anastasiia Salos
Cluj Napoca	(Ukraine) Taisiia Onofriichuk	(United States) Rin Keys	(Israel) Meital Maayam Sumkin

==== 5 Ribbons ====
Competitions	Gold	Silver	Bronze
World Cup
Sofia	Bulgaria	Japan	Poland
Baku	China	Israel	Kazakhstan
Tashkent	China	Poland	Kazakhstan
Milan	Italy	Poland	Japan
World Challenge Cup
Portimão	Brazil	Spain	United States
Cluj Napoca	Spain	Poland	Bulgaria

==== 3 Balls and 2 Hoops ====
Competitions	Gold	Silver	Bronze
World Cup
Sofia	Spain	Uzbekistan	Japan
Baku	Japan	China	Bulgaria
Tashkent	Poland	China	Uzbekistan
Milan	China	Japan	Brazil
World Challenge Cup
Portimão	Brazil	United States	Spain
Cluj Napoca	Spain	Poland	Italy

== Overall medal table ==
Rank	Nation	Gold	Silver	Bronze	Total
1	Germany (GER)	8	3	3	14
2	Ukraine (UKR)	6	8	3	17
3	Bulgaria (BUL)	5	3	6	14
4	Spain (ESP)	5	3	2	10
5	Italy (ITA)	5	2	5	12
6	Individual Neutral Athletes (AIN)	5	2	4	11
7	Brazil (BRA)	4	0	1	5
8	China (CHN)	3	3	3	9
9	Uzbekistan (UZB)	2	7	5	14
10	Poland (POL)	2	6	4	12
11	Japan (JPN)	1	4	2	7
12	Israel (ISR)	1	1	3	5
13	Cyprus (CYP)	1	1	1	3
14	United States (USA)	0	5	3	8
15	Kazakhstan (KAZ)	0	0	2	2
16	France (FRA)	0	0	1	1
Totals (16 entries)		48	48	48	144

== See also ==
- 2025 FIG Artistic Gymnastics World Cup series
