= Tara Dragas =

Italian rhythmic gymnast

- Born: 17 February 2007 (age 19) San Daniele del Friuli, Italy

Gymnastics career
- Discipline: Rhythmic gymnastics
- Country represented: Italy; (2020–present)
- Former countries represented: Slovenia
- Club: Associazione Sportiva Udinese
- Head coach: Špela Dragaš
- Eponymous skills: The Dragas: a 360 degree turning Arabesque, free leg horizontal backward with help, and with horizontal backbend
Medal record
Event	1st	2nd	3rd
European Championships	1	1	0
European Cup	0	2	2
World Cup	1	2	3
FIG World Challenge Cup	2	1	2
Grand Prix	3	8	5
Junior European Championships	0	1	0
Total	7	15	12
Rhythmic Gymnastics
Representing Italy
European Championships
Gold medal – first place	2025 Tallinn	Team
Silver medal – second place	2024 Budapest	Team
European Cup
Silver medal – second place	2025 Baku	Clubs
Silver medal – second place	2025 Baku	Ribbon
Bronze medal – third place	2025 Baku	Hoop
Bronze medal – third place	2026 Baku	Ribbon
Grand Prix Final
Gold medal – first place	2025 Brno	Ribbon
Silver medal – second place	2025 Brno	All-Around
Silver medal – second place	2025 Brno	Hoop
Bronze medal – third place	2025 Brno	Ball
Bronze medal – third place	2025 Brno	Clubs
Junior European Championships
Silver medal – second place	2022 Tel Aviv	Ribbon

Tara Dragas (born 17 February 2007) is an Italian individual rhythmic gymnast of Montenegrin-Slovenian descent. She is the 2022 European ribbon junior silver medalist.

At the national level, she is a two-time (2025, 2026) Italian all-around silver medalist, the 2022 Italian Junior champion and a two-time (2020, 2021) Italian Junior silver medalist.

== Personal life ==
Her mother, Špela Dragaš, is her coach and also the head coach of the Associazione Sportiva Udinese, where Dragas trains. Her father, Sasha Dragas, is a Croatian born Montenegrin singer and actor from the village of Dragaši. She has an older brother, Marko. Her maternal family comes from the Slovene minority in Italy. She fluently speaks three languages: Italian, Slovenian, and English.

== Career ==
Dragas took up rhythmic gymnastics at the age of four at the Associazione Sportiva Udinese. In her younger years, she also competed in Slovenia, representing KRG Narodni dom. She won the Slovenian National Championship title three times (2015–2017) in the girls' category. Afterward, she began participating in Italian national competitions.

=== Junior ===
Dragas debuted as a member of the national team in November 2020 at a bilateral competition held between Italy and Germany in Desio.

In 2022, she won 3 gold medals at the 5th edition of Comegym tournament and two gold medals at the international tournament in Portimão. She represented Italy at the Junior European Championships in Tel Aviv and won the silver medal in the ribbon final. Together with Alice Taglietti, she placed 5th in the team competition. Later in the year, she participated in the Tart Cup in Brno, where she won four golds and a silver medal.

=== Senior ===
==== 2023 ====
In 2023, Dragas made her senior international debut at the World Cup Sofia, along with veterans Milena Baldassarri and Sofia Raffaeli. Ultimately, she placed 19th place in the all-around competition. In June, Dragas competed at the 2023 Italian National Championships, her first as a senior, and finished in 7th place in the all-around competition. The next day, she won a silver medal with clubs and a bronze medal in the hoop final.

==== 2024 ====
In 2024, she attended more international competitions. On 19–21 April, she competed at Baku World Cup and placed 11th in the all-around. She advanced into two apparatus finals, finishing 4th in hoop and 6th in ball. She next competed at World Challenge Cup Portimao in Portugal, where she took 13th place in the all-around. She qualified to the all final and ended in 6th place.

In May, Dragas was selected to represent Italy at the 2024 European Championships in Budapest, Hungary, together with Sofia Raffaeli and Milena Baldassarri. They won the silver medal in the team competition. On 8 June, Dragaš competed at the 2024 Italian National Championships and finished in 4th place in the all-around. She also won the gold medal in the ribbon final, silver medals in hoop and clubs and bronze in the ball final. In July, she competed at Cluj-Napoca World Challenge Cup and placed 14th in the all-around.

==== 2025 ====
In 2025, Dragas began her international season competing at the Grand Prix Thiais in late March. She won the silver medal in the all-around behind Taisiia Onofriichuk and qualified for all four apparatus finals. She won silver medals in the clubs and ribbon finals and bronze medals with hoop and ball. On 18-20 April, she competed at the Baku World Cup, where she finished in 11th place in the all-around and advanced into two apparatus finals. She won bronze in the ribbon final, which was her first World Cup medal. On 1-4 May, Dragas competed at the 2025 European Cup Baku, where she won a bronze medal with hoop and silver medals with clubs and ribbon. In the cross-battles she was defeated in the first round by Lian Rona.

In June, Dragas was selected to represent Italy, along with Alice Taglietti and Sofia Raffaeli, at the 2025 European Championships in Tallinn. Together with the senior group, they won the gold medal in the team competition. She qualified to her first all-around final, where she ended in 5th place. On 14 June, she competed at the 2025 Italian National Championships and won the silver medal in the all-around. In a tight race with Raffaeli, she lost by 0.35 points. The day after, she won gold medals in the clubs and ribbon finals and silver in hoop and ball behind Raffaeli. In July, she took 5th place in all-around at Milan World Cup. She qualified to three finals, winning her first World Cup gold medal, in ribbon final and a bronze medal with ball. She placed 6th in clubs final. Then she competed at Cluj-Napoca World Challenge Cup and took 5th place in all-around, again. She won bronze medal in ball final and silver in clubs.

Dragas was selected to represent Italy alongside Sofia Raffaeli at the 2025 World Championships, in Rio de Janeiro, Brazil. In her first world championship all-around final, she finished in 13th place. Together with Sofia Raffaeli and senior group she took 6th place in team competition. She also took 6th place in ball and 4th place in ribbon final. In September, she won silver medal in all-around behind Taisiia Onofriichuk at Brno Grand Prix. In finals, she won gold with ribbon, silver with hoop and bronze with ball and clubs.

==== 2026 ====
Dragas began her 2026 season by competing at the Miss Valentine Grand Prix in Tartu in late February, where she won the gold medal in the ball final and the silver medal in the clubs final. On March 21-22, she competed at Grand Prix Marbella, where she took 4th place in all-around. In finals, she won silver in ball and bronze in ribbon. On April 4-5, she competed at Grand Prix Thiais, taking 4th place in all-around and qualified to three apparatus finals. She won gold medal with hoop, silver with ball and took 4th place in ribbon final. On April 17-19, she competed at the Baku World Cup and took 13th place in all-around. She qualified to clubs final, finishing 5th. In May, she competed at European Cup in Baku, and won bronze medal in ribbon. She lost in Cross battles against Daniela Munits with hoop.

In the end of May, she represented Italy at the 2026 European Championships in Varna, Bulgaria, alongside Sofia Raffaeli. She took 7th place in the all-around final and 6th place in team competition together with senior group. In June, Dragas competed at the 2026 Italian National Championships and won the silver medal in the all-around behind Raffaeli. She also won gold medals in ball and ribbon, and silver in hoop and clubs finals. In July, she competed at 2026 World Cup Milan and took her first ever AA medal- a bronze in a world cup as well as a silver medal with ball.

In August, she was selected to represent Italy at the 2026 World Championships in Frankfurt, Germany. She took 6th place in team competition alongside Sofia Raffaeli and senior group. She took 16th place in all-around final and qualified to ball final, finishing 4th.

In November, she helped her club ASU Udinese win gold medal in Italian Serie A1 club championship.

== Eponymous skill ==
Dragas has one eponymous skill listed in the code of points, consisting of an arabesque pivot with backbend and help, the supporting foot in relevé. She performed it for the first time at the Milan World Cup in 2025 and it was added to the code of points in June 2026. Dragas became the third Italian gymnast to have an eponymous skill approved, after Alexandra Agiurgiuculese and Sofia Raffaeli.

Skill name	Description	Base rotation	Base value (Note: Base value in the 2025-2028 Code of Points)
Dragas	Free leg horizontal backward with help and with backbend of the trunk, backbend - touching is required	360°	0.4

== Routine music information ==
Year	Apparatus	Music Title
2027	Hoop	Ständchen (Serenade) Schwanengesang, D957, n4 by Franz Schubert, Ludwig Rellstab
2027	Ball	
2027	Clubs	
2027	Ribbon	Don't go by Moyamina
2026	Hoop (first)	Due vite (Live) by Marco Mengoni
2026	Hoop (second)	Ständchen (Serenade) Schwanengesang, D957, n4 by Franz Schubert, Ludwig Rellstab
2026	Ball	Pokémon Black & White- Battle Vs. Ghetsis
2026	Clubs	Dracula- Euphoria Season 2 Official Score by Labrinth
2026	Ribbon	Ciganka sam mala by Jelena Tomašević
2025	Hoop	Wake up (feat. XEAH by Tommee Profitt
2025	Ball (first)	I Want to Know What Love Is by Mariah Carey
2025	Ball (second)	Vranjanka (Live version) by Jelena Tomašević
2025	Clubs	Caravan by Boban & Marko Markovic Orchestra
2025	Ribbon	Cria Da Ivete (Ao Vivo) by Ivete Sangalo
2024	Hoop	Guide Me Home by Freddie Mercury
2024	Ball	Como La Flor (feat. Mayre Martinez) from Scott Bradlee's Postmodern Jukebox
2024	Clubs	Turn Down for What by DJ Snake, Lil John, Prrrum and Rompe (Instrumental) by Daddy Yankee, Cosculluela
2024	Ribbon	Fato, mori dušmanke by Louis
2023	Hoop	Craw-Fever by Elvis Presley
2023	Ball	SOS by Dimash
2023	Clubs	Quantum Utopia (feat. Eugene Hütz) by Goran Bregović
2023	Ribbon	Vegas Rehearsal/That's All Right by Austin Butler and Elvis Presley
2022	Hoop	Beauty and the beast (Cinematic Piano/ Cello) cover by Jennifer Thomas and Armen Ksajikian
2022	Ball	SOS by Dimash
2022	Clubs	Opera by Gabry Ponte & La Diva
2022	Ribbon	Stalker's Tango by Autoheart
2021	Hoop	
2021	Ball	
2021	Clubs	Rave de Favela by Major Lazer, MC Lan, BEAM
2021	Ribbon	Caravan by Raphael Gualazzi
2018	Ball	Ya Mustafa by Manifico
2018	Ribbon	Melody of Heartbeat by Artem Uzunov

== Competitive highlights ==
(Team competitions in seniors are held only at the World Championships, Europeans and other Continental Games.)

International: Senior
Year	Event	AA	Team	Hoop	Ball	Clubs	Ribbon
2026	World Championships	16th	6th	12th (Q)	4th	32nd (Q)	31st (Q)
2026	World Cup Milan	3rd		15th (Q)	2nd	7th	11th (Q
2026	European Championships	7th	6th	10th (Q)	4th	16th (Q)	11th (Q)
2026	World Challenge Cup Portimao	3rd		11th (Q)	1st	4th	1st
2026	European Cup Baku			4th	6th	4th	3rd
2026	World Cup Baku	13th		40th (Q)	10th (Q)	5th	18th (Q)
2026	Grand Prix Thiais	4th		1st	2nd		4th
2026	Grand Prix Marbella	4th		5th	2nd		3rd
2026	Grand Prix Tartu	4th		4th	1st	2nd	17th (Q)
2025	Grand Prix Brno	2nd		2nd	3rd	3rd	1st
2025	World Championships	13th	6th	18th (Q)	6th	15th (Q)	4th
2025	World Cup Challenge Cluj-Napoca	5th		6th	3rd	2nd	10th (Q)
2025	World Cup Milan	5th		28th (Q)	3rd	6th	1st
2025	European Championships	5th	1st	10th (Q)		6th	5th
2025	European Cup Baku			3rd	4th	2nd	2nd
2025	World Cup Baku	11th		11th (Q)	27th (Q)	6th	3rd
2025	Grand Prix Thiais	2nd		3rd	3rd	2nd	2nd
2024	World Challenge Cup Cluj-Napoca	14th		16th (Q)	20th (Q)	10th (Q)	17th (Q)
2024	European Championships		2nd	15th (Q)			
2024	World Cup Portimao	13th		14th (Q)	6th	10th (Q)	30th (Q)
2024	World Cup Baku	11th		4th	6th	18th (Q)	18th (Q)
2023	World Cup Sofia	19th		15th (Q)	20th (Q)	21st (Q)	24th (Q)
International: Junior
Year	Event	AA	Team	Hoop	Ball	Clubs	Ribbon
2022	Junior European Championships		5th	4th			2nd
National: Senior
Year	Event	AA	Team	Hoop	Ball	Clubs	Ribbon
2026	Italian National Championships	2nd		2nd	1st	2nd	1st
2025	Italian National Championships	2nd		2nd	2nd	1st	1st
2024	Italian National Championships	4th		2nd	3rd	2nd	1st
2023	Italian National Championships	7th		2nd	13th (Q)	3rd	15th (Q)
National: Junior
Year	Event	AA	Team	Hoop	Ball	Clubs	Ribbon
2022	Italian National Championships	1st					
2021	Italian National Championships	2nd					
2020	Italian National Championships	2nd					
Q = Qualifications (Did not advance to Event Final due to the 2 gymnast per country rule, only Top 8 highest score); WR = World Record; WD = Withdrew; NT = No Team Competition; OC = Out of Competition(competed but scores not counted for qualifications/results)
