= Nationality changes in gymnastics =

Nationality changing in the sport of gymnastics is when a gymnast opts to represent a new country in international competitions. Gymnasts may request a nationality change through their federations, provided they have citizenship. The number of nationality changes a federation may request for athletes is limited to two per year per discipline and three over all disciplines. If the previous country gives consent for the gymnast to represent the new country, the gymnast may immediately begin representing the new country in competition. If consent is not granted, the gymnast will have to wait a year before they can represent the new country. If a gymnast has already been granted a nationality change, they must wait a minimum of three years before they can make a new request.

This is a list of notable gymnasts who have represented multiple countries in gymnastics competitions and had a valid FIG license for each. This list does not include gymnasts who competed for a new nation after the dissolution of their former country (i.e.: Soviet gymnasts).

== Artistic gymnastics ==
| Name of gymnast | Original nation | New nation | Year | Ref |
|---|---|---|---|---|
| Rustam Akhmad | Ukraine | Azerbaijan | 2018 | |
| Adem Asil | Egypt | Turkey | 2019 | |
| Sydney Barros | United States | Puerto Rico | 2022 | |
| Reiss Beckford | Great Britain | Jamaica | 2015 | |
| Charlotte Booth | United States | Great Britain | 2024 | |
| Georgia-Rose Brown | Australia | New Zealand | 2023 | |
| Oksana Chusovitina | Uzbekistan | Germany | 2006 | |
| Oksana Chusovitina | Germany | Uzbekistan | 2013 | |
| Adam Cogat | France | Algeria | 2024 | |
| Ioannis Chronopoulos | Canada | Greece | 2026 | |
| Dominick Cunningham | Great Britain | Ireland | 2022 | |
| Tara Donnelly | Ireland | Great Britain | 2021 | |
| Aleah Finnegan | United States | Philippines | 2022 | |
| Danusia Francis | Great Britain | Jamaica | 2018 | |
| Rozalia Galiyeva | Uzbekistan | Russia | 1995 | |
| Alexa Grande | Guatemala | El Salvador | 2019 | |
| Vitaliy Guimaraes | United States | Brazil | 2025 | |
| Annia Hatch | Cuba | United States | 2003 | |
| Halle Hilton | Great Britain | Ireland | 2022 | |
| Yulia Inshina | Russia | Azerbaijan | 2013 | |
| David Jessen | United States | Czech Republic | 2015 | |
| Viktoria Karpenko | Ukraine | Bulgaria | 2003 | |
| Maria Kharenkova | Russia | Georgia | 2019 | |
| Illia Kovtun | Ukraine | Croatia | 2025 | |
| Carina Kroell | Germany | Austria | 2022 | |
| Nikolai Kuksenkov | Ukraine | Russia | 2013 | |
| Evgeniya Kuznetsova | Russia | Bulgaria | 2001 | |
| Adam Lakomy | United States | Czech Republic | 2026 | |
| Djenna Laroui | France | Algeria | 2026 | |
| Li Donghua | China | Switzerland | 1994 | |
| Emma Malabuyo | United States | Philippines | 2023 | |
| Tyesha Mattis | Great Britain | Jamaica | 2022 | |
| Dorien Motten | Belgium | Georgia | 2023 | |
| Kaylia Nemour | France | Algeria | 2023 | |
| Ellis O'Reilly | Great Britain | Ireland | 2014 | |
| John Orozco | United States | Puerto Rico | 2020 | |
| Petro Pakhniuk | Ukraine | Azerbaijan | 2014 | |
| Petro Pakhniuk | Azerbaijan | Ukraine | 2017 | |
| Tonya Paulsson | Sweden | Chinese Taipei | 2025 | |
| Anna Pavlova | Russia | Azerbaijan | 2013 | |
| Eddie Penev | Bulgaria | United States | 2011 | |
| Eddie Penev | United States | Bulgaria | 2023 | |
| Matvei Petrov | Russia | Albania | 2018 | |
| Levi Ruivivar | United States | Philippines | 2023 | |
| Irina Sazonova | Russia | Iceland | 2015 | |
| Maria Smirnova | Russia | Azerbaijan | 2013 | |
| Radomyr Stelmakh | Ukraine | Germany | 2026 | |
| Oleg Stepko | Ukraine | Azerbaijan | 2014 | |
| Oleg Stepko | Azerbaijan | Russia | 2018 | |
| Tiana Sumanasekera | United States | Sri Lanka | 2026 | |
| Ayelén Tarabini | Argentina | Kyrgyzstan | 2023 | |
| İvan Tixonov | Russia | Azerbaijan | 2018 | |
| Marius Tobă | Romania | Germany | 1991 | |
| Ignacio Yockers | United States | Spain | 2025 | |

== Rhythmic gymnastics ==
| Name of gymnast | Original nation | New nation | Year | Ref |
|---|---|---|---|---|
| Elizaveta Lugovskikh | Russia | Montenegro | 2022 | |
| Katerina Pisetsky | Ukraine | Israel | 2002 | |
| Amina Zaripova | Uzbekistan | Russia | 1990 | |
| Ekaterina Vedeneeva | Russia | Slovenia | 2018 | |
| Carmel Kallemaa | Estonia | Canada | 2019 | |
| Rachel Stoyanov | North Macedonia | Bulgaria | 2022 | |
| Eleonora Romanova | Ukraine | Russia | 2017 | |
| Elizaveta Nazarenkova | Russia | Uzbekistan | 2014 | |
| Mary Sanders | Canada | United States | 2002 | |
| Artemi Gavezou | Greece | Spain | 2013 | |
| Yanika Vartlaan | Estonia | Ukraine | 2018 | |
| Anastasia Simakova | Russia | Germany | 2022 | |
| Alexandra Agiurgiuculese | Romania | Italy | 2015 | |
| Vera Tugolukova | Russia | Cyprus | 2022 | |
| Margarita Mamun | Bangladesh | Russia | 2010 | |
| Elif Zeynep Celep | Turkey | Azerbaijan | 2015 | |
| Daniela Mogurean | Moldova | Italy | 2015 | |
| Tatyana Volozhanina | Russia | Bulgaria | 2017 | |
| Ayshan Bayramova | Russia | Azerbaijan | 2014 | |
| Aliya Garayeva | Russia | Azerbaijan | 2005 | |
| Dinara Gimatova | Russia | Azerbaijan | ??? | |
| Svetlana Rudalova | Ukraine | Belarus | ??? | |
| Yelyzaveta Luzan | Ukraine | Azerbaijan | 2015 | |
| Siyana Vasileva | Bulgaria | Azerbaijan | 2013 | |
| Veronika Hudis | Ukraine | Azerbaijan | 2015 | |
| Annaliese Dragan | United States | Romania | 2019 | |
| Brigita Budginas | United States | Lithuania | 2019 | |
| Narendra Sutjiati | United States | Indonesia | 2019 | |
| Emily Beznos | United States | Moldova | 2023 | |
| Anna Khutsishvili | Georgia | France | 2025 | |
| Judith Hauser | Hungary | Germany | 2012 | |
| Kizzy Rivas | Venezuela | Colombia | 2022 | |
| Melaniia Tur | Ukraine | Israel | 2024 | |
| Nika Zajc | Slovenia | Switzerland | 2024 | |
| Fernanda Heinemann | Brazil | Paraguay | 2024 | |
| Oriana Viñas | Venezuela | Colombia | 2017 | |
| Eva Blanka Gyulai | Hungary | Portugal | 2025 | |
| Olivia Fischer Martinez Suchkova | United States | El Salvador | 2025 | |
| Lisa Garac | Romania | Germany | 2026 | |

== Trampoline gymnastics ==
| Name of gymnast | Original nation | New nation | Year | Ref |
|---|---|---|---|---|
| Anna Dogonadze | Georgia | Germany | 1998 | |
| Ángel Hernández | Spain | Colombia | 2013 | |
| Iana Lebedeva | Russia | Belarus | 2025 | |
