= 2024 FIG Rhythmic Gymnastics European Cup =

International rhythm gymnastics competition

The 2024 European Cup is a competition at the initiative of the European Gymnastics.

== Formats ==
European Cup
Date	Event	Location	Type
May 3–5	FIG European Cup 2024	Azerbaijan	Individuals and groups

== Medal winners ==
=== All-around (Cross-Battle) ===
==== Individual ====
Competitions	Gold	Silver	Bronze
European Cup
Baku	(Bulgaria) Stiliana Nikolova	(Italy) Sofia Raffaeli	(Israel) Daria Atamanov

==== Group ====
Competitions	Gold	Silver	Bronze
European Cup
Baku	Israel	Italy	Azerbaijan

=== Apparatus ===
==== Hoop ====
Competitions	Gold	Silver	Bronze
European Cup
Baku	(Italy) Sofia Raffaeli	(Bulgaria) Boryana Kaleyn	(Cyprus) Vera Tugolukova

==== Ball ====
Competitions	Gold	Silver	Bronze
European Cup
Baku	(Bulgaria) Boryana Kaleyn	(Romania) Christina Dragan	(Israel) Daniela Munits

==== Clubs ====
Competitions	Gold	Silver	Bronze
European Cup
Baku	(Bulgaria) Stiliana Nikolova	(Italy) Sofia Raffaeli	(Cyprus) Vera Tugolukova

==== Ribbon ====
Competitions	Gold	Silver	Bronze
European Cup
Baku	(Bulgaria) Boryana Kaleyn	(Cyprus) Vera Tugolukova	(Italy) Sofia Raffaeli

==== 5 Hoops ====
Competitions	Gold	Silver	Bronze
European Cup
Baku	Israel	Italy	Bulgaria

==== 3 Ribbons and 2 Balls ====
Competitions	Gold	Silver	Bronze
European Cup
Baku	Bulgaria	Italy	Azerbaijan

=== Junior ===
==== Team Ranking ====
Competitions	Gold	Silver	Bronze
European Cup
Baku	Israel	Bulgaria	Romania

=== Apparatus ===
==== Hoop ====
Competitions	Gold	Silver	Bronze
European Cup
Baku	(Israel) Alona Tal Franco	(Romania) Amalia Lică	(Bulgaria) Dara Malinova

==== Ball ====
Competitions	Gold	Silver	Bronze
European Cup
Baku	(Israel) Meital Maayan Sumkin	(Azerbaijan) Ilaha Bahadirova	(Bulgaria) Magdalena Valkova

==== Clubs ====
Competitions	Gold	Silver	Bronze
European Cup
Baku	(Israel) Alona Tal Franco	(Romania) Amalia Lică	(Bulgaria) Dara Malinova

==== Ribbon ====
Competitions	Gold	Silver	Bronze
European Cup
Baku	(Israel) Meital Maayan Sumkin	(Azerbaijan) Shams Aghahuseynova	(Romania) Amalia Lică
