= Annaliese Dragan =

Romanian rhythmic gymnast

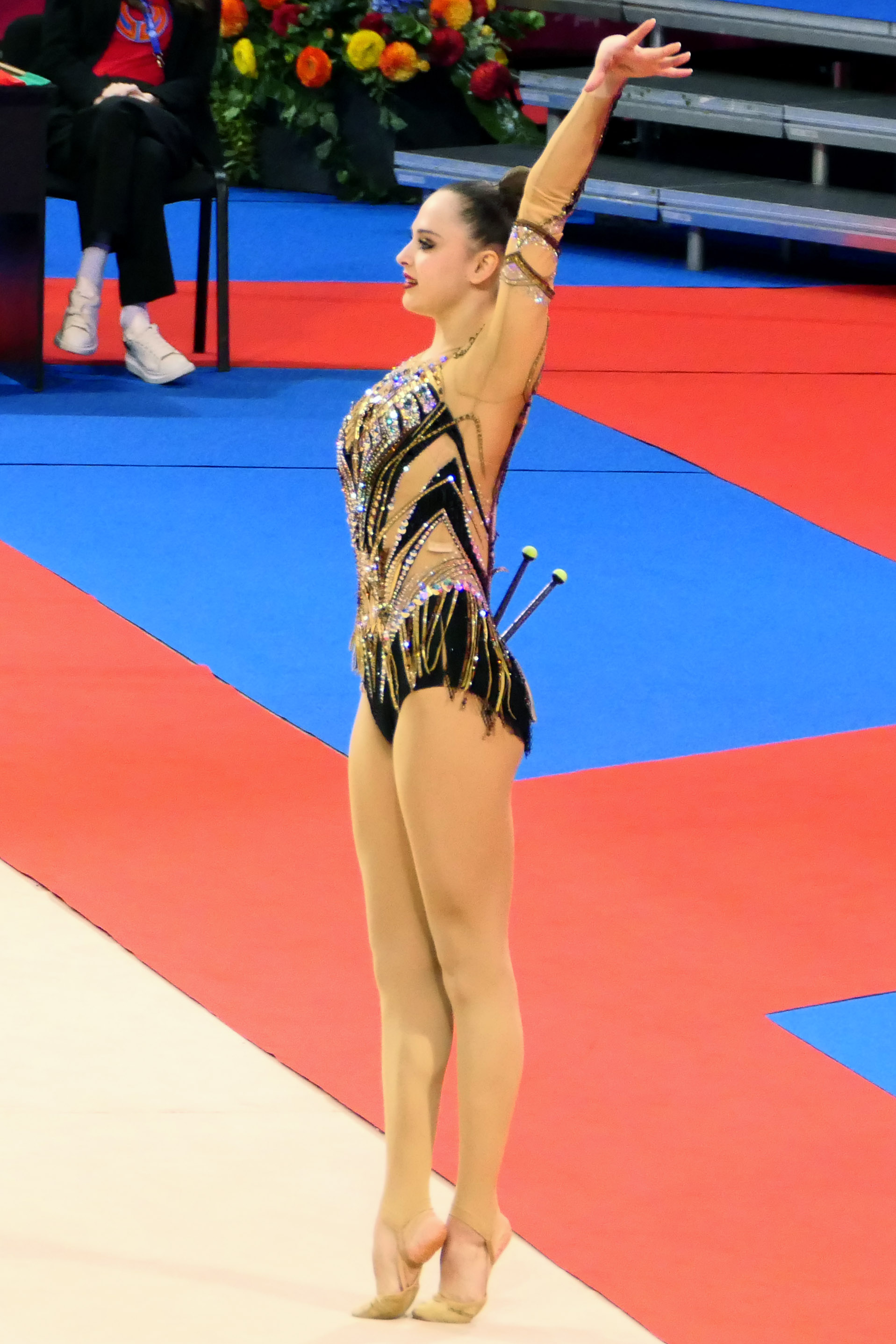
- Dragan in 2024

Personal information
- Full name: Annaliese Dragan
- Born: September 15, 2005 (age 20) Orange County, California, United States

Gymnastics career
- Discipline: Rhythmic gymnastics
- Country represented: Romania (2020–2024)
- Former countries represented: United States
- Club: Sportul Studentesc Bucuresti
- Head coach: Alexandra Piscupescu
- Assistant coach: Maria Garba

Annaliese Dragan (born September 15, 2005) is a Romanian-American rhythmic gymnast. Along with teammate Andreea Verdes, she was the first Romanian gymnast in 26 years to qualify for the apparatus finals at the World Championships in 2022. She competed at the 2024 Paris Olympics in the rhythmic individual all-around.

== Personal life ==
Dragan trains at her mother's gym in Irvine, California and has also lived and trained in Romania since she was 13. Her younger sister Christina Dragan is also a rhythmic gymnast.

== Gymnastics career ==
=== Junior ===
Dragan was named to the USA Gymnastics National Team of 2018-2019.

In 2019, she changed nationality and began competing for the Romanian Federation. Her first international competition for Romania was the 2020 European Championships in Kyiv, Ukraine. She was 9th in the all-around and qualified for the rope, clubs and ribbon finals.

=== Senior ===
Dragan competed with clubs and ribbon at the 2021 Pesaro World Cup. She also competed at the World Challenge Cup in Cluj-Napoca, where she placed 8th in the hoop final. In June she was part of the team that competed at the European Championship in Varna, Bulgaria with teammates Andreea Verdes and Denisa Mailat. Later in the year, she was also selected for the World Championship in Kitakyushu, Japan, where she ended in 22nd place in the all-around qualification and failed to advance to the final.

In 2022, Dragan became Romania's second gymnast and inaugurated her season with the World Cup in Palaio Faliro, where she qualified for the hoop and clubs final. She then competed at the World Cup stage in Sofia. She was again selected again for the 2022 European Championship in Tel Aviv, Israel, together with Verdes for the senior team and Amalia Lică and Dragan's sister Christina for the junior team. She placed 20th in the all-around final.

In September, she competed at the 2022 World Championships in Sofia, Bulgaria. She placed 12th in the all-around qualifications and qualified to the final, where she ended in 18th place because of mistakes with clubs. Dragan qualified to three apparatus finals, placing 8th in ball, 7th in clubs and 6th in ribbon.

At the World Championships in 2023, she competed with pain in her left ankle, an issue that had been bothering her for several years. She qualified for the all-around final in 17th place. This earned Romania a spot at the 2024 Olympic Games, the first since Ana Luiza Filiorianu in 2016. Dragan described seeing her scores as "the best moment of my life". She later returned to the United States to receive surgery and rehabilitation for her ankle.

In 2024, Dragan competed at the World Cup stage in Sofia, where she finished in 21st in the all-around. At the 2024 European Championships, she qualified for the all-around final and came in 21st place.

In August, Dragan competed at the 2024 Paris Olympics. She finished in 21st place in the individual all-around qualifications, with her best performance coming on clubs, and did not advance to the final. Of her experience, she said, "It was very stressful and exhausting, but I felt good and I really enjoyed the experience very much." She later stated that she was not accompanied by her main coach, Alexandra Piscupescu, only her assistant coach, and that she did not feel she had enough support.

In October, Dragan's father accused the president of the Romanian Rhythmic Gymnastics Federation, Irina Deleanu, of abusing Dragan, her sister, and several other gymnasts through verbal abuse, comments about her weight, and over-training on injuries. He also said that Dragan often competed without her coach due to a lack of support from the federation, and that when Deleanu accompanied Dragan to the 2024 European Championships as her coach, she violated competition rules. Deleanu denied these accusations and said that Dragan's mother had been the one to make the comments about her weight, and that Dragan had pre-existing medical and congenital issues that she had been cleared to train on by doctors. Following this dispute, Dragan was removed from the Romanian national team and returned to the United States to continue training.

Dragan posted on her Instagram on January 8, 2025 that she was taking a break from rhythmic gymnastics, which she said was because "over the past Olympic cycle—and especially in the last two years—I found myself in a toxic environment that became increasingly difficult to navigate". She added that she hoped to return to gymnastics and attempt to qualify for the 2028 Summer Olympics. In January 2025, several Romanian rhythmic gymnasts came forward with allegations of abuse against coaches, including Dragan. She repeated her allegations of verbal abuse and said that she had been afraid of training.

In April 2026, after Deleanu said in an interview that Dragan wanted to retire after the 2024 Olympics, Dragan stated that her intention after the Olympics was to continue training for the 2028 Summer Olympics and that she never told Deleanu that she wanted to quit.

== Routine music information ==
Year	Apparatus	Music Title
2024	Hoop	Human by Rag'n'Bone Man
2024	Ball	Je Me Souviens by Lara Fabian
2024	Clubs	Great Spirit (feat. Hilight Tribe) by Armin van Buuren and Vini Vici
2024	Ribbon	Royal Blood by Caleb Swift
2023	Hoop	Ehyeh by Alessandro Safina
2023	Ball	Domestic Pressures by Jóhann Jóhannsson
2023	Clubs	Great Spirit (feat. Hilight Tribe) by Armin van Buuren and Vini Vici
2023	Ribbon	La boda de Luis Alfonso
2022	Hoop	Unstoppable by E.S. Posthumus
2022	Ball	Domestic Pressures by Jóhann Jóhannsson
2022	Clubs	That Man by Caro Emerald
2022	Ribbon	La boda de Luis Alfonso
2021	Hoop	You're X-Men/End Titles by John Ottman
2021	Ball	The Heat by Peter Gabriel
2021	Clubs	That Man by Caro Emerald
2021	Ribbon	Grand Central by Patrick Doyle
2020	Rope	Wake Me Up Before You Go-Go by Wham!
2020	Ball	Rhapsody in Rock VI by Robert Wells
2020	Clubs	No Hay Problema by Pink Martini
2020	Ribbon	Grand Central by Patrick Doyle

== See also ==
- Nationality changes in gymnastics
