= Ketevan Arbolishvili =

Georgian rhythmic gymnast

- ქეთევან არბოლიშვილი
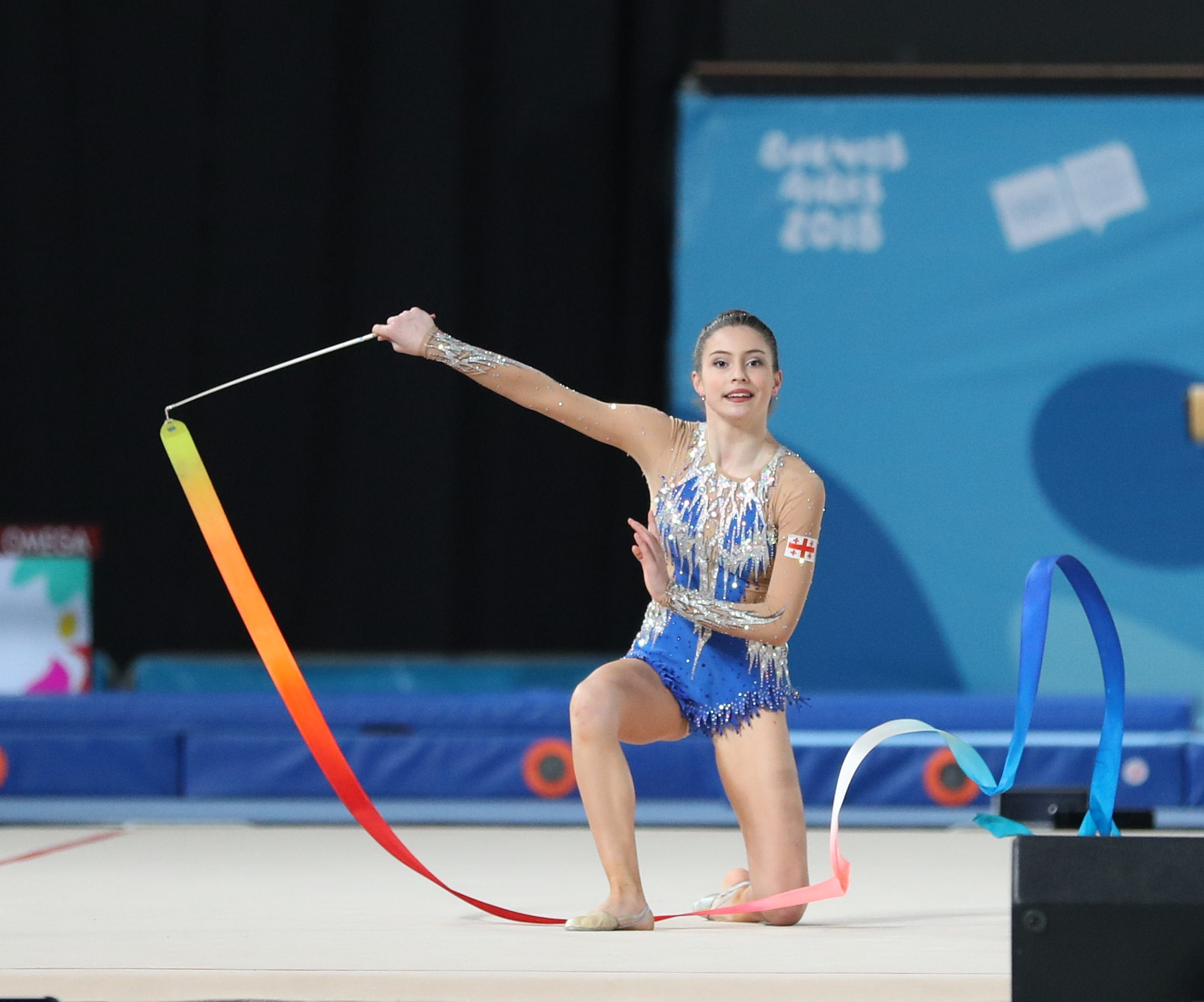

Personal information
- Born: 5 August 2003 (age 23) Tbilisi, Georgia

Gymnastics career
- Discipline: Rhythmic gymnastics
- Country represented: Georgia (2016-2024)
- Head coach: Bella Kobaladze
- Assistant coaches: Tamar Kobaladze, Salome Pazhava

Ketevan Arbolishvili (born 5 August 2003) is a former Georgian rhythmic gymnast. She represented her country at international competitions. She announced her retirement via an Instagram post on 15 April 2024.

== Career ==
=== Junior ===
Arbolishvili debuted at the 2016 European Championships in Holon, where she competed with rope and ball, ending 32nd and 25th respectively. She was also 11th in the team competition.

In 2018 she competed at the European Championships in Guadalajara. She was 9th in the all-around, 25th with hoop, 41st with ball, 27th with clubs and 14th with ribbon. In October, she represented Georgia at the Youth Olympics in Buenos Aires, where she was 10th in the all-around.

=== Senior ===
==== 2019 season ====
Arbolishvili began her senior career by competing in two World Cups, Baku and Minsk. In Baku, she was 57th in the all-around, 69th with hoop, 57th with ball, 49th with clubs and 15th with ribbon. In Minsk, she ended 41st in the all-around, 31st with hoop, 44th with ball, 41st with clubs and 46th with ribbon. At the European Championships in Baku, she finished 52nd in the all-around, 29th with ball and clubs and 37th with ribbon. Arbolishvili was also selected for the World Championships, again in Baku, along with Natela Bolataeva and Salome Pazhava. There she was 51st with clubs, 52nd with ribbon and 9th in teams.

2021 season

In 2021, she made her season debut at the World Cup in Sofia, ending 41st in the all-around, 57th with hoop, 40th with ball, 38th with clubs and 24th with ribbon. She then competed at the World Cup in Baku, where she was 43rd in the all-around, 39th with hoop, 43rd with ball, 42nd with clubs and 45th with ribbon. In June, she competed at the 2021 European Championships in Varna. She came 31st in the all-around, 31st with hoop, 33rd with ball, and 33rd with clubs. Later in the year, she was also selected for the World Championships in Kitakyushu, where she ended 34th in the all-around and with hoop, 28th with ball, 39th with clubs and 25th with ribbon.

In December she was selected as one of 13 gymnasts from 13 different countries to represent Georgia in the experimental Divine Grace Cup. She won the bronze medal.

2022 season

Arbolishvili began her season by competing at the World Cup in Baku. She was 18th in the all-around, 30th with hoop, 23rd with ball, 11th with clubs and 12th with ribbon. In June, she was in Tel Aviv to participate in the European Championships. She ended 22nd in the all-around and 14th in teams. At the start of September, she once again represented Georgia at the 2002 World Championships in Sofia along with the Georgian senior group. She was 48th in the all-around, 65th with hoop, 44th with ball, 54th with clubs and 36th with ribbon.

2023 season

Arbolishvili first competed at the World Cup in Baku, where she placed 33rd in the all-around. She next competed at the World Challenge Cup in Portimão. There, she finished 11th place in the all-around and qualified to the ball final, where she placed 6th.

In the weeks leading up to the 2023 European Championships, she suffered an hip and back injury but was still able to compete alongside her teammate Anna Khutsishvili.

She was the only Georgian individual to compete at the 2023 World Championships in Valencia, Spain. In the all-around, she finished in 36th place, with her best placement being 29th with clubs.

2024 season

On April 15, Arbolishvili announced her retirement due to injuries via an Instagram post. She said that she would continue to be involved in the sport as a coach.
