= Fidan Gurbanli =

Azerbaijani rhythmic gymnast

- Born: 17 November 2010 (age 15) Azerbaijan

Gymnastics career
- Discipline: Rhythmic gymnastics
- Country represented: Azerbaijan; (2024-)
- Club: Zira Cultural Center
- Head coach: Aysel Allahverdiyeva Gasanova
- Assistant coaches: Nigar Abdusalimova, Sabina Hajiyeva
Medal record
Representing Azerbaijan
European Cup
Silver medal – second place	2025 Burgas	Clubs
Junior European Championships
Bronze medal – third place	2024 Budapest	Team

Fidan Gurbanli (Azerbaijani: Fidan Qurbanlı; born 17 November 2010) is an Azerbaijani rhythmic gymnast. She represents Azerbaijan in international competitions.

== Career ==
=== Junior ===
In 2024, she took part in the 1st Rhythmic Gymnastics European Cup in Baku, where she and her teammates took 5th place in team competition. In May, she won team bronze medal with Shams Aghahuseynova, Govhar Ibrahimova and Ilaha Bahadirova at the European Championships in Budapest.

In 2025, she competed at the 3rd Rhythmic Gymnastics European Cup in Burgas, where she won silver medal in clubs final. In June, she represented Azerbaijan at the 2025 Junior World Championships in Sofia, Bulgaria, and took 4th place in clubs final.

=== Senior ===
Fidan started competing as a senior in 2026. On April 3-5, she made her debut at AGF Trophy International tournament in Baku, and won silver medal in ball final and bronze in team competition. On April 10-12, she made her World Cup debut at Tashkent World Cup and took 38th place in all-around. In June, she took 18th place in all-around at Beijing World Challenge Cup. In July, she was 44th in all-around at Milan World Cup. In August, she represented Azerbaijan at the 2026 World Championships in Frankfurt, Germany. She took 43rd place in all-around qualifications and did not advance into all-around final.
