= Adriana Teocan =

Romanian rhythmic gymnast

- Full name: Adriana Cecilia Teocan
- Born: 16 June 1994 (age 32) Bucharest, Romania
- Spouse: Daniel Mitroi

Gymnastics career
- Discipline: Rhythmic gymnastics
- Country represented: Romania (2009-2014)
- Club: Olimpia
- Head coach: Maria Garba
- Assistant coach: Elena Vlad
- Choreographer: Anca Iorga
- Retired: yes
Medal record
Representing Romania
Rhythmic Gymnastics
Event	1st	2nd	3rd
Grand Prix	0	1	1
Total	0	1	1

Adriana Cecilia Teocan-Mitroi (born 16 June 1994) is a Romanian individual rhythmic gymnast and coach. She won medals both at national and international level

== Career ==
After taking up the sport in 2000, in 2008 she finished 4th in the Romanian Cup and at nationals. She was invited to join the national team in 2009, winning silver at the national championships behind Alexandra Piscupescu. The same year she won silver in the All-Around, with rope, with hoop, with ball and witch clubs at the Romanian Cup.

Adriana turned senior in 2010, debuting at the Irina Deleanu Cup, in May she finished 39th at the Grand Prix in Corbeil-Essonnes, then she was selected for the World Championships in Moscow along Piscupescu, she finished 97th in the All-Around, 101st with rope, 96th with hoop, 92nd with ball and 112th with ribbon. In October she won silver in the All-Around, with rope and with ball as well as bronze with hoop and ribbon at the national championships, a month later she was 3rd in the All-Around, with rope and with ribbon, 4th with hoop and 1st with ball at the Romanian Cup.

In June 2012 she won bronze in the All-Around and silver with ribbon at the Irina Deleanu Cup. In October she became the vice national champion in the All-Around and all four event finals, she and also won gold in teams along Piscupescu and Diana Cojocaru. At the Berlin Masters she was 10th in the All-Around and 8th with ball.

In 2013 she competed at the World Cup in Bucharest, finishing 16th. At nationals in October she won silver in the All-Around, was 7th with hoop, 8th with ball, 5th with clubs and 4th with ribbon. A month later she won All-Around gold at the Romanian Cup. Teocan took part in the 2014's Irina Deleanu Cup, finishing 5th in all the events, she retired shortly after.

Currently she works as a coach at ACS Dandri Bucarest, one of her trainees being Amalia Lică who got the first European gold for Romania and won two medals at the Junior World Championships, she also works with the national junior group that under her won a worlds team medal in 2023.
