= 2024 Rhythmic Gymnastics European Cup =

Rhythmic gymnastics competition

- Venue: National Gymnastics Arena
- Location: Baku, Azerbaijan
- Start date: 3 May 2024
- End date: 5 May 2024

The 2024 Rhythmic Gymnastics European Cup is the inaugural European Cup in Rhythmic Gymnastics. The competition was held at the National Gymnastics Arena in Baku, Azerbaijan from 3 to 5 May, 2024.

== Participating countries ==
Sources:

- Andorra
- Angola
- Australia
- Austria
- Azerbaijan
- Belgium
- Bulgaria
- Canada
- Costa Rica
- Croatia
- Cuba
- Cyprus
- Czech Republic
- Egypt
- Spain
- Estonia
- Finland
- France
- Georgia
- Greece
- Hungary
- India
- Israel
- Italy
- Kyrgyzstan
- South Korea
- Latvia
- Luxembourg
- Moldova
- Mongolia
- Montenegro
- Romania
- Slovenia
- Serbia
- Switzerland
- Ukraine
- United States
- Uzbekistan

== Competition schedule ==
- Friday May 5
  - 09:00 – 12:00 Senior Individual Qualification (Hoop & Ball), Set A
  - 12:15 – 15:09 Senior Individual Qualification (Hoop & Ball), Set B
  - 16:00 – 19:00 Senior Individual Qualification (Hoop & Ball), Set C
  - 19:30 – 22:24 Senior Individual Qualification (Hoop & Ball), Set D
- Saturday May 6
  - 10:00 – 11:45 Senior Groups All-Around + award ceremony
  - 12:00 – 14:50 Senior Individuals Cross Battles + award ceremony
  - 15:30 – 18:18 Individual Qualification & Team Ranking Juniors, Set A
  - 18:35 – 21:35 Individual Qualification & Team Ranking Juniors, Set B + award ceremony
- Sunday May 7
  - 10:00 – 11:15 Senior Individuals Apparatus Finals Hoop & Ball
  - 11:20 – 12:55 Senior Individuals Apparatus Finals Clubs & Ribbon + award ceremonies apparatus finals
  - 13:45 – 14:30 Senior Groups Apparatus Final 5 Hoops
  - 14:45 – 15:30 Senior Groups Apparatus Final 3 ribbons & 2 balls + award ceremonies apparatus finals senior groups
  - 15:45 – 17:00 Junior Individuals Apparatus Finals Hoop & Ball
  - 17:05 – 19:00 Junior Individuals Apparatus Finals Clubs & Ribbon + award ceremonies apparatus finals

== Medal winners ==
Event	Gold	Silver	Bronze
Senior Group Finals
All-Around	Israel; Shani Bakanov; Adar Friedmann; Romi Paritzki; Ofir Shaham; Diana Svertsov	Italy; Martina Centofanti; Agnese Duranti; Alessia Maurelli; Daniela Mogurean; Laura Paris	Azerbaijan; Gullu Aghalarzade; Laman Alimuradova; Kamilla Aliyeva; Zeynab Hummatova; Yelyzaveta Luzan; Darya Sorokina
5 Hoops	Israel; Shani Bakanov; Adar Friedmann; Romi Paritzki; Ofir Shaham; Diana Svertsov	Italy; Martina Centofanti; Agnese Duranti; Alessia Maurelli; Daniela Mogurean; Laura Paris	Bulgaria; Rachel Stoyanov; Sofia Ivanova; Magdalina Minevska; Margarita Vasileva; Kamelia Petrova
3 Ribbons + 2 Balls	Bulgaria; Rachel Stoyanov; Sofia Ivanova; Magdalina Minevska; Margarita Vasileva; Kamelia Petrova	Italy; Martina Centofanti; Agnese Duranti; Alessia Maurelli; Daniela Mogurean; Laura Paris	Azerbaijan; Gullu Aghalarzade; Laman Alimuradova; Kamilla Aliyeva; Zeynab Hummatova; Yelyzaveta Luzan; Darya Sorokina
Senior Individual Finals
Cross Battle	(Bulgaria) Stiliana Nikolova	(Italy) Sofia Raffaeli	(Israel) Daria Atamanov
Hoop	(Italy) Sofia Raffaeli	(Bulgaria) Boryana Kaleyn	(Cyprus) Vera Tugolukova
Ball	(Bulgaria) Boryana Kaleyn	(Romania) Christina Dragan	(Israel) Daniela Munits
Clubs	(Bulgaria) Stiliana Nikolova	(Italy) Sofia Raffaeli	(Cyprus) Vera Tugolukova
Ribbon	(Bulgaria) Boryana Kaleyn	(Cyprus) Vera Tugolukova	(Italy) Sofia Raffaeli
Junior Individual Finals
Team	Israel; Alona Tal Franco; Meital Maayam Sumkin	Bulgaria; Dara Malinova; Magdalena Valkova	Romania; Amalia Lică; Lisa Garac
Hoop	(Israel) Alona Tal Franco	(Romania) Amalia Lică	(Bulgaria) Dara Malinova
Ball	(Israel) Meital Maayam Sumkin	(Azerbaijan) Ilaha Bahadirova	(Bulgaria) Magdalena Valkova
Clubs	(Israel) Alona Tal Franco	(Romania) Amalia Lică	(Bulgaria) Dara Malinova
Ribbon	(Israel) Meital Maayam Sumkin	(Azerbaijan) Shams Aghahuseynova	(Romania) Amalia Lică

== Results ==
=== Seniors ===
==== Group All-Around ====
Rank	Nation	5	3, 2	Total
1st place, gold medalist(s)	Israel	38.40	35.15	73.55
2nd place, silver medalist(s)	Italy	37.70	34.00	71.70
3rd place, bronze medalist(s)	Azerbaijan	37.55	34.00	71.55
4	Bulgaria	37.75	29.15	66.90
5	Hungary	33.35	30.70	64.05
6	Georgia	25.10	23.65	48.75
7	Romania	28.20	20.20	48.40
8	South Korea	21.35	11.25	32.60

==== 5 Hoops ====
Rank	Nation	D Score	A Score	E Score	Pen	Total
1st place, gold medalist(s)	Israel	22.4	8.50	8.10	0.05	38.95
2nd place, silver medalist(s)	Italy	21.60	8.50	7.95		38.05
3rd place, bronze medalist(s)	Bulgaria	21.60	8.40	7.75		37.75
4	Azerbaijan	20.70	8.40	7.85		36.95
5	Hungary	18.10	7.35	6.95	0.35	32.05
6	Romania	14.30	7.30	5.90	0.05	27.45
7	Georgia	12.10	6.70	4.40		23.20

==== 3 Ribbons + 2 Balls ====
Rank	Nation	D Score	A Score	E Score	Pen	Total
1st place, gold medalist(s)	Bulgaria	18.20	8.20	7.80	0.30	33.90
2nd place, silver medalist(s)	Italy	17.60	8.30	7.80		33.70
3rd place, bronze medalist(s)	Azerbaijan	15.90	7.70	6.35		29.95
4	Hungary	15.6	7.65	6.95	0.30	29.90
5	Israel	13.3	7.05	5.50	0.30	25.55
6	Romania	12.40	7.20	5.80		25.40
7	Georgia	12.50	6.25	4.50	0.90	22.35

==== Cross battles last 16 round with hoop ====
Gymnast 1	Score	Gymnast 2	Score
Sofia RaffaeliItaly	35.60	Anna Khutsishvili	30.55
Zohra AghamirovaAzerbaijan	33.90	Christina Dragan Romania	28.90
Daria Atamanov Israel	36.85	Alexandra Kiroi-Bogatyreva Australia	32.55
Vera Tugolukova Cyprus	33.85	Khrystyna Pohranychna	30.60

==== Cross battles last 16 round with ball ====
Gymnast 1	Score	Gymnast 2	Score
Ekaterina Vedeneeva Slovenia	32.55	Panagiota Lytra Greece	31.50
Stiliana Nikolova Bulgaria	35.50	Kamilla Seyidzade	29.25
Daniela Munits Israel	31.10	Milena Baldassarri Italy	31.95
Boryana Kaleyn Bulgaria	31.70	Andreea Verdes Romania	31.10

==== Cross battles last 8 round with hoop ====
Gymnast 1	Score	Gymnast 2	Score
Ekaterina Vedeneeva Slovenia	33.00	Stiliana NikolovaBulgaria	37.20
Boryana KaleynBulgaria	35.70	Milena Baldassarri Italy	31.20

==== Cross battles last 8 round with ball ====
Gymnast 1	Score	Gymnast 2	Score
Sofia Raffaeli Italy	35.00	Zohra AghamirovaAzerbaijan	32.40
Vera TugolukovaCyprus	32.75	Daria AtamanovIsrael	34.55

==== Cross battles last 4 round with clubs ====
Gymnast 1	Score	Gymnast 2	Score
Sofia Raffaeli Italy	34.35	Daria AtamanovIsrael	33.90
Stiliana NikolovaBulgaria	34.25	Boryana KaleynBulgaria	34.10

==== Cross battle bronze medal round with ribbon ====
Gymnast 1	Score	Gymnast 2	Score
Daria Atamanov🥉 Israel	32.95	Boryana KaleynBulgaria	31.35

==== Cross battle gold medal round with ribbon ====
Gymnast 1	Score	Gymnast 2	Score
Sofia Raffaeli🥈 Italy	32.20	Stiliana Nikolova 🥇Bulgaria	32.80

==== Hoop final ====
Rank	Gymnast	Nation	D Score	A Score	E Score	Pen	Total
1st place, gold medalist(s)	Sofia Raffaeli	Italy	18.30	8.40	8.40	0.05	35.05
2nd place, silver medalist(s)	Boryana Kaleyn	Bulgaria	17.40	8.30	8.00	0.10	33.60
3rd place, bronze medalist(s)	Vera Tugolukova	Cyprus	17.50	8.00	7.60		33.10
4	Christina Dragan	Romania	16.40	8.15	8.05	0.05	32.55
5	Panagiota Lytra	Greece	16.20	8.05	8.00		32.25
6	Ekaterina Vedeneeva	Slovenia	15.50	8.15	8.20	0.10	31.75
7	Maelle Millet	France	16.10	7.80	7.85		31.75
8	Zohra Aghamirova	Azerbaijan	16.20	7.95	7.50		31.65

==== Ball final ====
Rank	Gymnast	Nation	D Score	A Score	E Score	Pen	Total
1st place, gold medalist(s)	Boryana Kaleyn	Bulgaria	17.90	8.30	8.15		34.35
2nd place, silver medalist(s)	Christina Dragan	Romania	18.00	8.00	8.15		34.15
3rd place, bronze medalist(s)	Daniela Munits	Israel	17.70	8.00	8.15		33.85
4	Sofia Raffaeli	Italy	17.60	8.25	7.90		33.75
5	Ekaterina Vedeneeva	Slovenia	17.00	8.20	8.20		33.40
6	Zohra Aghamirova	Azerbaijan	17.10	8.05	8.20		33.35
7	Panagiota Lytra	Greece	16.70	8.00	7.95		32.65
8	Anastasia Ikan	Ukraine	16.40	8.00	8.20		32.60

==== Clubs final ====
Rank	Gymnast	Nation	D Score	A Score	E Score	Pen	Total
1st place, gold medalist(s)	Stiliana Nikolova	Bulgaria	18.00	8.30	8.20		34.50
2nd place, silver medalist(s)	Sofia Raffaeli	Italy	17.60	8.40	8.35		34.35
3rd place, bronze medalist(s)	Vera Tugolukova	Cyprus	16.70	8.20	8.15		33.05
4	Ekaterina Vedeneeva	Slovenia	16.30	8.15	8.25		32.70
5	Christina Dragan	Romania	15.70	8.15	8.25		32.10
6	Panagiota Lytra	Greece	14.70	7.65	7.55		30.90
7	Alexandria Kautzman	United States	15.80	7.65	7.45		30.90
8	Khrystyna Pohranychna	Ukraine	15.10	7.75	7.90		30.75

==== Ribbon final ====
Rank	Gymnast	Nation	D Score	A Score	E Score	Pen	Total
1st place, gold medalist(s)	Boryana Kaleyn	Bulgaria	16.40	8.40	8.15		32.95
2nd place, silver medalist(s)	Vera Tugolukova	Cyprus	16.10	8.20	8.05		32.35
3rd place, bronze medalist(s)	Sofia Raffaeli	Italy	15.60	8.40	8.25		32.25
4	Zohra Aghamirova	Azerbaijan	15.60	8.20	8.00		31.80
5	Ekaterina Vedeneeva	Slovenia	15.30	8.30	8.15		31.75
6	Christina Dragan	Romania	14.90	8.00	7.50		30.40
7	Khrystyna Pohranychna	Ukraine	14.20	7.80	7.95		29.95
8	Anette Vaher	Estonia	13.10	7.55	7.25		27.90

=== Junior ===
==== Teams ====
Rank	Nation	Total
1st place, gold medalist(s)	Israel	126.80
2nd place, silver medalist(s)	Bulgaria	121.70
3rd place, bronze medalist(s)	Romania	120.85
4	Italy	118.5
5	Azerbaijan	117.90
6	Cyprus	111.50
7	France	109.05
8	Estonia	108.20
9	Georgia	106.80
10	Latvia	106.50
11	Hungary	105.80
12	Moldova	104.70
13	Belgium	103.30
14	Switzerland	101.85
15	Serbia	100.45
16	Luxembourg	99.10
17	Montenegro	97.20
18	Austria	95.60
19	Czech Republic	95.50
20	Kyrgyzstan	95.10
21	Costa Rica	82.35
22	Egypt	81.05
23	Andorra	79.70

==== Hoop ====
Rank	Gymnast	Nation	D Score	A Score	E Score	Pen	Total
1st place, gold medalist(s)	Alona Tal Franco	Israel	17.20	8.25	8.40		33.85
2nd place, silver medalist(s)	Amalia Lică	Romania	16.30	8.15	8.10		32.55
3rd place, bronze medalist(s)	Dara Malinova	Bulgaria	15.60	8.00	8.10		31.70
4	Elene Tsulukidze	Georgia	14.10	7.85	8.00		29.95
5	Ludovica Platoni	Italy	13.80	8.00	8.00		29.80
6	Elena Vukmir	Hungary	13.60	7.85	7.55		29.00
7	Govhar Ibrahimova	Azerbaijan	13.50	8.00	7.35		28.85
8	Alja Ponikvar	Slovenia	12.10	7.70	7.30		27.10

==== Ball ====
Rank	Gymnast	Nation	D Score	A Score	E Score	Pen	Total
1st place, gold medalist(s)	Meital Maayam Sumkin	Israel	15.60	8.40	8.40		32.40
2nd place, silver medalist(s)	Ilaha Bahadirova	Azerbaijan	15.00	8.35	8.20		31.55
3rd place, bronze medalist(s)	Magdalena Valkova	Bulgaria	14.50	8.25	8.15		30.90
4	Lisa Garac	Romania	13.50	7.75	7.10		28.35
5	Yseult Zavagno	France	12.50	7.95	7.85		28.30
6	Anna Piergentili	Italy	11.90	7.85	7.20	0.30	26.65
7	Alja Ponikvar	Slovenia	11.80	7.30	6.55		25.65
8	Ekaterina Sharova	Cyprus	10.70	7.15	6.10	0.30	23.65

==== Clubs ====
Rank	Gymnast	Nation	D Score	A Score	E Score	Pen	Total
1st place, gold medalist(s)	Alona Tal Franco	Israel	14.80	8.20	7.95		30.95
2nd place, silver medalist(s)	Amalia Lică	Romania	14.50	8.15	8.25		30.90
3rd place, bronze medalist(s)	Dara Malinova	Bulgaria	14.50	8.10	8.20		30.80
4	Margherita Fucci	Italy	14.10	7.95	8.20		30.25
5	Boglarka Barkoczi	Hungary	14.60	7.75	7.90		30.25
6	Alise Lebedeva	Latvia	14.00	7.85	7.95		29.80
7	Sofia Jakovleva	Estonia	12.90	7.70	7.80		28.40
8	Maria Sokolova	Cyprus	12.30	7.90	7.50		27.60

==== Ribbon ====
Rank	Gymnast	Nation	D Score	A Score	E Score	Pen	Total
1st place, gold medalist(s)	Meital Maayam Sumkin	Israel	15.10	8.35	8.20	0.05	31.60
2nd place, silver medalist(s)	Shams Aghahuseynova	Azerbaijan	13.90	8.15	8.20		30.25
3rd place, bronze medalist(s)	Amalia Lică	Romania	13.70	8.10	8.10		29.90
4	Carlotta Fulignati	Italy	11.70	8.05	7.85	0.05	27.55
5	Barbare Kajaia	Georgia	11.20	8.00	7.55		26.75
6	Elys Kretelle Kukk	Estonia	10.40	7.75	7.60		25.75
7	Dara Malinova	Bulgaria	10.70	7.50	7.35		25.55
8	Naia Okasha	France	9.20	7.85	7.45		24.50

== Medal table ==
* Host nation (Azerbaijan)

Rank	Nation	Gold	Silver	Bronze	Total
1	Israel	7	0	2	9
2	Bulgaria	5	2	4	11
3	Italy	1	5	1	7
4	Romania	0	3	2	5
5	Azerbaijan*	0	2	2	4
6	Cyprus	0	1	2	3
Totals (6 entries)		13	13	13	39
