= Alina Mammadova =

Azeri rhythmic gymnast (born 2007)

- Məmmədova Alina
- Born: 19 December 2007 (age 18)

Gymnastics career
- Discipline: Rhythmic gymnastics
- Country represented: Azerbaijan (2022-present)
- Club: Republican Complex Sports School
- Head coaches: Vilyayeva Yevgeniya, Aleksandra Reysh

Alina Mammadova (Azerbaijani: Məmmədova Alina; born 19 December 2007) is an Azeri rhythmic gymnast. She represents Azerbaijan in international competitions.

== Career ==
Mammadova was the 2019 national champion at the Azerbaijani Championships among pre juniors.

=== Junior ===
In 2022 she was selected for the European Championships in Tel Aviv, competing with ball she was 6th in the final and 7th in teams along Madina Damirova, Kamila Gafarova and Kamilla Seyidzade. In December she won silver with ball at the Winter Cup in Leverkusen.

=== Senior ===
Mammadova became age eligible for senior competitions in 2023, debuting at the Gracia Fair Cup where she won bronze in the All-Around. Later she was 45th in the All-Around, 42nd with hoop, 37th with ball, 42nd with clubs and 46th with ribbon at the World Cup in Athens. In April she won gold in the All-Around, with hoop and with ball, silver with ribon and bronze with clubs at the "Suada Dilberovich" tournament in Sarajevo. At national she won bronze with ball.

In 2024 she competed at the Marbella Grand Prix. In April she participated in the World Cup in Tashkent, being 25th in the All-Around, 24th with hoop, 18th with ball, 29th with clubs and 33rd with ribbon.

She was incorporated into the national senior group in 2026, taking part in the European Cup in Baku she finished 11th with 5 balls and 5th with 3 hoops & 4 clubs. In late May she was selected for the European Championships in Varna, the group was 11th in the All-Around, 11th with 5 balls and 15th in the mixed event. At the World Challenge Cup in Beijing they were 11th overall and 6th with 5 balls. In Milan they were 25th in the All-Around. She was then selected for the World Championships in Frankfurt alongside Ilaha Bahadirova, Zahra Jafarova, Sofiya Mammadova, Shams Muvaffagi and Ilona Zeynalova.
