= Gymnastics at the 2024 Summer Olympics – Women's rhythmic individual all-around =

Women's rhythmic individual all-around at the Games of the XXXIII Olympiad
- Venue: Porte de La Chapelle Arena
- Date: 8 August 2024 (qualification); 9 August 2024 (final)
- Competitors: 24 from 20 nations
- Winning total: 142.850

Medalists
1st place, gold medalist(s)		Darja Varfolomeev	Germany
2nd place, silver medalist(s)		Boryana Kaleyn	Bulgaria
3rd place, bronze medalist(s)		Sofia Raffaeli	Italy

The Women's rhythmic individual all-around competition at the 2024 Summer Olympics was held at the Porte de La Chapelle Arena in Paris, France, with the qualification taking place on 8 August and the final on 9 August.

== Qualification ==
A National Olympic Committee (NOC) could enter up to 2 qualified gymnasts. A total of 24 quota places are allocated to women's rhythmic gymnastics.

The first three spots were qualified from the 2022 Rhythmic Gymnastics World Championships, and the next 15 gymnasts from the 2023 Rhythmic Gymnastics World Championships; these were non-nominative spots given to the national federations, not the gymnast who won them. Because the Olympic host country (France) qualified a spot, the Olympic host spot was reallocated. The next five spots were nominative and came from each of five continental championships. The last spot was determined by the Tripartite invitation.

== Competition format ==
The competition consisted of a qualification round and a final round. The top ten gymnasts in the qualification round advanced to the final round. In each round, the gymnasts performed four routines (ball, hoop, clubs, and ribbon), with the scores added to give a total.

== Results ==
=== Qualification ===
Rank	Name	Hoop (rhythmic gymnastics)	Ball (rhythmic gymnastics)	Clubs (rhythmic gymnastics)	Ribbon (rhythmic gymnastics)	Total	Qualification
1	Sofia Raffaeli (ITA)	**35.700 (1)**	34.450 (5)	35.000 (2)	**33.950 (1)**	139.100	Q
2	Darja Varfolomeev (GER)	32.500 (12)	**36.450 (1)**	**35.250 (1)**	32.650 (3)	136.850	Q
3	Boryana Kaleyn (BUL)	35.350 (2)	34.600 (4)	33.600 (5)	32.900 (2)	136.450	Q
4	Taisiia Onofriichuk (UKR)	34.250 (5)	35.250 (2)	33.750 (4)	32.500 (4)	135.750	Q
5	Margarita Kolosov (GER)	34.550 (4)	33.000 (7)	33.800 (3)	30.150 (15)	131.500	Q
6	Ekaterina Vedeneeva (SLO)	34.150 (7)	32.600 (11)	32.300 (8)	31.750 (8)	130.800	Q
7	Daria Atamanov (ISR)	33.250 (10)	32.700 (10)	32.100 (9)	32.400 (5)	130.450	Q
8	Bárbara Domingos (BRA)	34.750 (3)	33.100 (6)	30.200 (17)	31.700 (9)	129.750	Q
9	Milena Baldassarri (ITA)	33.300 (9)	32.750 (8)	30.900 (11)	32.300 (6)	129.250	Q
10	Wang Zilu (CHN)	34.200 (6)	32.000 (15)	30.650 (13)	31.250 (12)	128.100	Q
11	Stiliana Nikolova (BUL)	33.900 (8)	34.700 (3)	28.050 (19)	31.050 (13)	127.700	R1
12	Fanni Pigniczki (HUN)	32.650 (11)	32.600 (12)	30.450 (15)	31.650 (10)	127.350	R2
13	Elzhana Taniyeva (KAZ)	30.850 (17)	32.000 (16)	32.300 (7)	31.450 (11)	126.600	R3
14	Takhmina Ikromova (UZB)	31.700 (14)	32.350 (13)	30.350 (16)	32.000 (7)	126.400	R4
15	Polina Berezina (ESP)	29.700 (21)	32.750 (9)	32.450 (6)	30.200 (14)	125.100	
16	Vera Tugolukova (CYP)	31.150 (15)	31.200 (18)	30.600 (14)	28.800 (19)	121.750	
17	Hélène Karbanov (FRA)	30.500 (19)	32.350 (14)	28.650 (18)	29.650 (16)	121.150	
18	Evita Griskenas (USA)	30.500 (18)	31.200 (17)	27.550 (21)	29.250 (17)	118.500	
19	Zohra Aghamirova (AZE)	32.500 (12)	30.200 (20)	26.750 (23)	28.400 (20)	117.850	
20	Alba Bautista (ESP)	31.100 (16)	28.100 (23)	30.800 (12)	27.650 (21)	117.650	
21	Annaliese Dragan (ROU)	27.200 (23)	30.550 (19)	31.650 (10)	25.450 (23)	114.850	
22	Alexandra Kiroi-Bogatyreva (AUS)	30.050 (20)	28.550 (21)	26.850 (22)	28.900 (18)	114.350	
23	Aliaa Saleh (EGY)	28.700 (22)	28.150 (22)	27.850 (20)	27.000 (22)	111.700	
24	Praewa Misato Philaphandeth (LAO)	21.600 (24)	21.600 (24)	22.250 (24)	21.900 (24)	87.350	

- **Bold** — top score in each of the four routines.
- Italics — top score of all four routines.

=== Final ===
Rank	Name	Hoop (rhythmic gymnastics)	Ball (rhythmic gymnastics)	Clubs (rhythmic gymnastics)	Ribbon (rhythmic gymnastics)	Total
1st place, gold medalist(s)	Darja Varfolomeev (GER)	**36.300 (1)**	**36.500 (1)**	**36.350 (1)**	33.700 (2)	142.850
2nd place, silver medalist(s)	Boryana Kaleyn (BUL)	35.850 (2)	36.450 (2)	34.550 (3)	**33.750 (1)**	140.600
3rd place, bronze medalist(s)	Sofia Raffaeli (ITA)	35.250 (4)	32.900 (6)	35.900 (2)	32.250 (7)	136.300
4	Margarita Kolosov (GER)	34.600 (6)	34.150 (3)	33.950 (6)	32.550 (6)	135.250
5	Daria Atamanov (ISR)	35.200 (5)	31.800 (9)	33.850 (7)	33.000 (3)	133.850
6	Ekaterina Vedeneeva (SLO)	34.100 (7)	31.950 (8)	33.150 (8)	32.700 (5)	131.900
7	Wang Zilu (CHN)	35.250 (3)	32.700 (7)	34.300 (4)	29.300 (9)	131.550
8	Milena Baldassarri (ITA)	32.600 (8)	33.150 (5)	32.500 (9)	31.450 (8)	129.700
9	Taisiia Onofriichuk (UKR)	30.400 (9)	30.900 (10)	34.150 (5)	32.950 (4)	128.400
10	Bárbara Domingos (BRA)	29.600 (10)	33.200 (4)	31.200 (10)	29.100 (10)	123.100

- **Bold** — top score in each of the four routines.
- Italics — top score of all four routines.

== See also ==
- List of Olympic medalists in rhythmic gymnastics
