= Denisa Mailat =

Romanian rhythmic gymnast

- Full name: Denisa Mihaela Mailat
- Nicknames: Deny Miha, Deni
- Born: 11 October 2002 (age 23) Bucharest, Romania

Gymnastics career
- Discipline: Rhythmic gymnastics
- Country represented: Romania
- Club: CSA Steau Bucuresti
- Head coach: Maria Girba

Denisa Mihaela Mailat (born 11 October 2002) is a Romanian rhythmic gymnast. She competed at the 2018 and 2019 World Championships.

== Personal life ==
Denisa Mailat was born on 11 October 2002, in Bucharest. She was named the 2018 Athlete of the Year by the Romanian Gymnastics Federation. Her goal is to compete at the 2020 Olympic Games. In January 2021, Mailat was hospitalized due to COVID-19 and received cortisone treatment for three weeks.

In January 2025, Mailat was one of several Romanian rhythmic gymnasts who came forward with allegations of abuse from coaches. She said that she had been physically and mental abused, that she had witnessed fellow gymnast Ana Luiza Filiorianu being beaten on the head, and that her coach justified the abuse when she won medals after being beaten.

== Gymnastics career ==
Mailat competed in the junior division with Alice Maria David, Sonia Ichim, and Denisa Stoian at the 2016 European Championships where they finished 16th as a team. Mailat won the gold medal in the junior clubs final at the 2017 Irina Deleanu Cup.

Mailat competed at the 2018 European Championships where she finished 21st in the all-around. Then at the 2018 World Championships, she finished 38th in the all-around.

At the 2019 World Challenge Cup in Cluj-Napoca, Romania, Mailat won the bronze medal in the clubs, her first World Challenge Cup medal. She competed at the 2019 European Championships with Andreea Verdes where they finished 8th as a team. At the 2019 World Championships, she finished 19th in the qualification round and qualified to the all-around final. The Romanian team of Mailat, Alice Maria David, and Andreea Verdes finished in 12th place. In the all-around final, she finished 24th with a total score of 70.850.
