= Naia Okasha =

French rhythmic gymnast

- Born: 5 June 2009 (age 17) Longjumeau

Gymnastics career
- Discipline: Rhythmic gymnastics
- Country represented: France (2023-)
- Club: Morsang GR
- Head coach: Anna Baranova
- Assistant coach: Sara Bayón
- Choreographer: Gregory Milan
Medal record
Rhythmic Gymnastics
Representing France
Event	1st	2nd	3rd
FIG World Cup	0	0	1
Total	0	0	1
European Championships
Silver medal – second place	2025 Tallinn	5 Ribbons

Naia Okasha (born 5 June 2009) is a French rhythmic gymnast. She represents France as a member of the senior group.

== Biography ==
In November 2022 she won bronze among the juniors born in 2009 at the national team control training. In July 2023 she was called up for a training stage. In December she took second place among the gymnasts born in 2009, third among the juniors born in 2009/2010.

In 2024 she took part in the first national control training of the season being first among the juniors. In March she participated in a bilateral meet with the Italian team in Desio being third in teams. She then competed in the Aphrodite Cup in Athens, being 32nd. In April she was 12th with hoop and 26th with ribbon at the Sofia Cup. At the first edition of the European Cup in Baku, she was 8th in the ribbon final. She was then selected for the European Championships in Budapest, finishing 12th with ribbon, 19th with clubs, 21st with hoop and 14th teams along Yseult Zavagno. In June she won bronze at the French Championships.

In 2025, with the retirement of some of the members of the previous group, she became a starter making her debut at the Grand Prix in Thiais. There she won silver in the All-Around and bronze with 5 ribbons. In April the group competed in the World Cup in Sofia, being 8th overall, 10th with 5 ribbons and 8th with 3 balls & 2 hoops. Weeks later they were in Tashkent, taking 6th place in the All-Around, 6th place with 5 ribbons and 4th place in the mixed final. In May they participated in the stage in Portimão, finishing 5th with 5 ribbons, 6th with 3 balls & 2 hoops and winning bronze in the All-Around. She was then selected for the European Championships in Tallinn, where the group was 9th overall and won silver in the 5 ribbons final.
