= Emily Beznos =

American gymnast (born 2006)

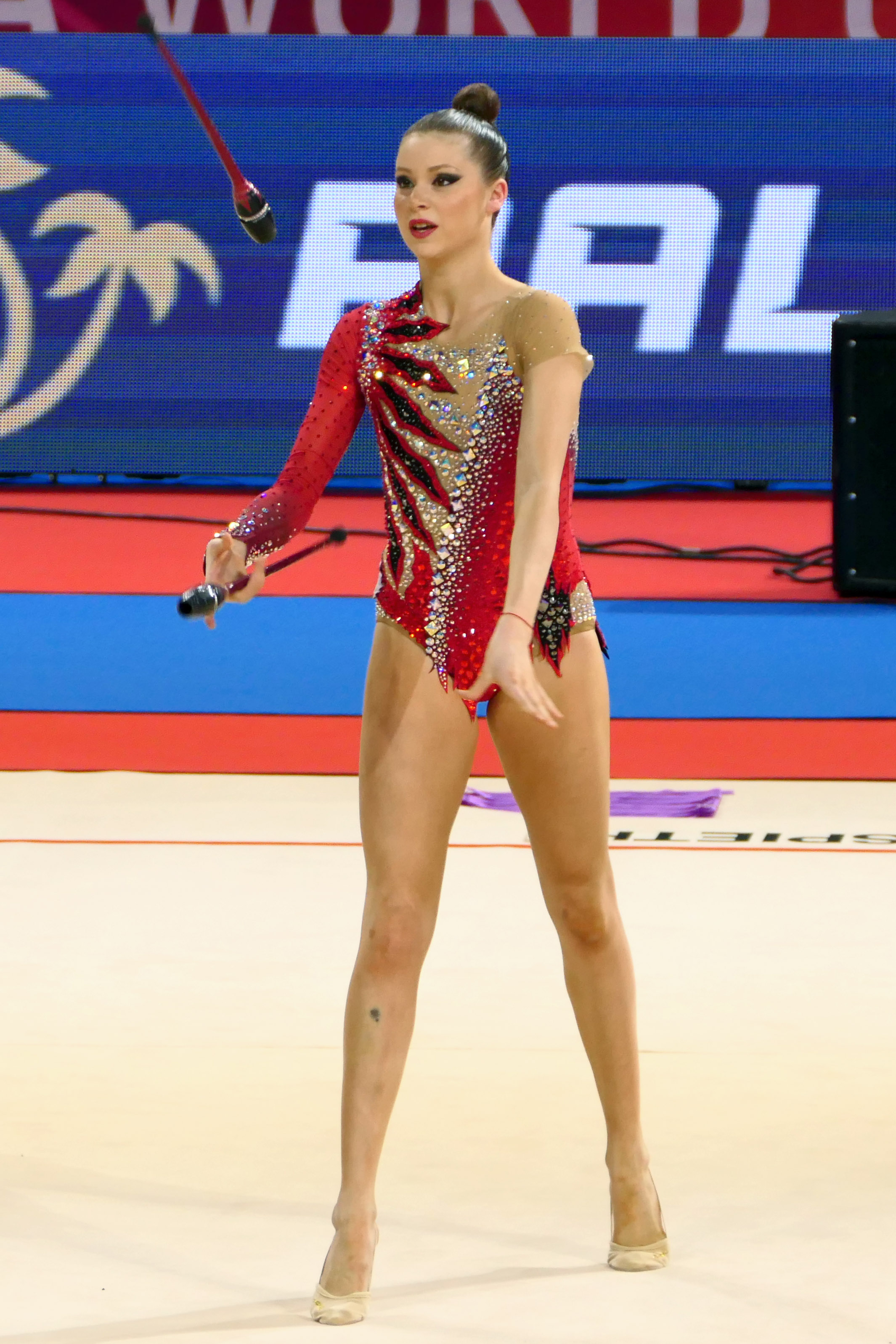
- Beznos in 2024

Personal information
- Full name: Emily Kate Beznos
- Born: 1 June 2006 (age 20) California, United States

Gymnastics career
- Discipline: Rhythmic gymnastics
- Country represented: Moldova (2023-2025)
- Former countries represented: United States
- Head coach: Liliana Madan
- Retired: yes
- Awards: Shooting Star Award

Emily Kate Beznos (born 1 June 2006) is an American retired individual rhythmic gymnast of Moldovan descent. She represented Moldova in international competitions.

== Personal life ==
Beznos began university several years earlier than most students due to the high standard of her performance at school. She then completed a bachelor's degree in cognitive science at the University of California in just two years, graduating in 2023, at age 16, with highest distinction.

== Career ==
She began competing in rhythmic gymnastics at age four. In May 2021, she took part in the Ritam Cup in the junior category, where she was 14th in the all-around.

In 2023, she started to represent Moldova internationally. In April of that year, she made her debut at the World Cup in Tashkent. She was 31st overall. A month later, she competed at the European Championships in Baku, taking 43rd place in the all-around. In July, she placed 37th at the World Cup in Cluj-Napoca and 45th at the World Cup in Milan. In August she was selected for the World Championships in Valencia. There, she finished 50th in the all-around.

At the 2024 World Cup in Sofia she was 36th overall. The following month, she was crowned Moldovan national champion. In May, she took part in the European Championships in Budapest, where she ended 43rd in the all-around. She was also awarded the Shooting Star award due to graduating university at 16 and her advocacy for women in science and technology. At the World Cup stage in Milan, she finished in 37th place in the all-around.

In early April 2025, she made her season debut at the World Cup in Sofia, where she was 69th overall. She next competed at the World Cup stage in Baku, where she placed 44th in the all-around. In June, she competed at the European Championships in Tallinn, taking 48th place overall, though 19th with ribbon. In late July, she participated in the University Games in Essen, finishing 30th place in the all-around. In August, she was selected for the World Championships in Rio de Janeiro, where she placed 55th in the all-around. In September, she announced she had made the decision to retire from the sport.
