= Yseult Zavagno =

French rhythmic gymnast

- Born: 14 August 2010 (age 16) Bourg-la-Reine, France

Gymnastics career
- Discipline: Rhythmic gymnastics
- Country represented: France; (2023-)
- Club: GRS Paris Centre

Yseult Zavagno (born 14 August 2010) is a French rhythmic gymnast. She represents France in international competitios.

== Career ==
Zavagno was selected for a national training camp for juniors and pre juniors in July 2022.

=== Junior ===
She entered the Pole (high performance centre) of Île-de-France in 2023, topping the rankings among gymnasts born in 2010. In July she took part in a national training camp for juniors.

In February 2024 she was second, behind Naia Okasha, among juniors at the first national test. The following month she was 3rd in teams, along Okasha, at a bilateral competition with the Italian team. At the Aphrodite Cup she took 57th place in the All-Around. Competing at the Sofia Cup she was 26th with clubs and 38th with ball. In May she took part in the 1st edition of the European Cup in Baku, performing with ball she was 7th with the apparatus and in teams. She was then selected for the European Championships in Budapest, being 10th with ball. The following month she won gold among juniors at the French Championships. In December she was the best 2010 born gymnast, being confirmed into the national team.

At the first national test of 2025 she took 1st place. At the "Swirl & Twirl" tournament in Udine she won gold in the junior competition. Later she participated in the Aphrodite Cup, being 19th overall. The following month she was 9th in the All-Around and 7th with hoop at the MTM Narodni Dom in Ljubjana. In May she won bronze in team, along Algara Kochankova, at the Gdynia Rhythmic Stars. Later she was crowned national junior champion. Then she was selected for the 3rd Junior World Championships in Sofia along Kochankova, being 41st with hoop, 21st with clubs and 14th with ribbon. In December she took 3rd place, already among seniors, at the national team review.

=== Senior ===
Zavagno became age eligible for senior competitions in 2026. In February she was called up for the first national test. She made her international debut at the Marbella Grand Prix, being 21st overall. In early April she participated in the Grand Prix in Thiais, taking 14th place in the All-Around, 14th with hoop, 19th with ball, 7th with clubs and 17th with ribbon. The following month she took silver, behind Maëna Millon, at nationals also taking silver with hoop and ribbon as well as gold with ball and ribbon. Days later she was 10th overall and won silver with ribbon at the Tiblissi Cup. In July she made her World Cup debut in Milan, being 66th in the All-Around, 78th with hoop, 42nd with ball, 55th with clubs and 66th with ribbon. In August she was selected for the Mediterranean Games in Taranto, being 8th in the final. At the end of the month she participated in a joint training stage with the Italian national team.
