= Lisa Garac =

Romanian rhythmic gymnast

- Full name: Lisa Maria Garac
- Born: 19 June 2010 (age 16) Aalen, Germany

Gymnastics career
- Discipline: Rhythmic gymnastics
- Country represented: Germany; (2026-)
- Former countries represented: Romania
- Club: TSV Schmiden
- Head coach: Elena Khadartseva
- Former coach: Alexandra Piscupescu
Medal record
Representing Romania
Rhythmic Gymnastics
Junior World Championships
Bronze medal – third place	2023 Cluj-Napoca	Team
European Cup
Bronze medal – third place	2024 Baku	Team
Junior European Championships
Gold medal – first place	2024 Budapest	Team

Lisa Maria Garac (born 19 June 2010) is a Romanian-born rhythmic gymnast who competes for Germany. She won team bronze at the 2023 Junior World Championships.

== Career ==
=== Junior ===
In her first year as a junior gymnast, she debuted at the 2023 Fellbach-Schmiden international tournament, where she competed with ball, ending 3rd in teams and 7th in the apparatus final. In March, she won bronze in the all-around at the Aphrodite Cup in the category for those born in 2010. At the International Tournament Sofia Cupm, she was 22nd in the all-around. In May she was 4th in teams, 11th in the all-around and 8th in the ball final at the Gdynia Cup. In July, she was selected for the Junior World Championships in Cluj-Napoca, where she won bronze in teams alongside Amalia Lică and the junior national group.

In 2024 she was selected for the European Cup in Baku, where she won bronze in the team event. At the 2024 European Championships in Budapest, she won the junior team gold along with Lică; this was the first time a Romanian team had won the junior team event. She qualified for the ball final, where she placed 5th.

At the end of 2024, Garac won the junior gold medal at the Winter Cup in Germany. It was reported that shortly afterward, her coach, Alexandra Piscupescu was removed from the national team with no explanation. Garac was able to continue training, though without her coach.

After this, Garac's family moved to Germany, where her grandmother is from. Piscupescu alleged that as part of a conflict within the Romanian federation and with its head Irina Deleanu, Garac was told that she would not receive assignments to major competitions unless she changed coaches. Deleanu contended that Garac was given no such condition, and that she moved because her mother was a doctor and found a job at a German hospital.

In 2025, Garac became the junior national all-around champion of Germany.

=== Senior ===
In March 2026, her nationality change was approved. In July, she took 6th place in all-around at German National Championships. She won bronze medals in ball and clubs finals.

== Achievements ==
- Part of the first Romanian team to win a team medal at the World Championships (Junior).

== Routine music information ==
Year	Apparatus	Music Title
2026	Hoop	My Tunnels Are Long and Dark These Days by Asaf Avidan
2026	Ball	Amorfoda by Mayré Martínez
2026	Clubs	Sword Sparring / Weaving Thorn by Ghostwriter
2026	Ribbon	Attacca by Spearfisher, Brianna Tam
2024	Hoop	Truly Inspirational by Clemens Wijers / The Game Is Afoot by Eternal Eclipse
2024	Ball	Fairytales and Heros by Gabriel Saban & Tian Bo
2024	Clubs	Upside Down by Paloma Faith
2024	Ribbon	Land of Yesterday by Caroline O'Connor & Anastasia Company
2023	Hoop	Flamenco Bolero by Gustavo Montesano & Royal Philharmonic Orchestra
2023	Ball	Steppe by René Aubry
2023	Clubs	Upside Down by Paloma Faith
2023	Ribbon	Suite Festiva de Exitos by Pascual Gonzalez
