= Govhar Ibrahimova =

Azerbaijani rhythmic gymnast

- Born: 13 April 2009 (age 17) Azerbaijan

Gymnastics career
- Discipline: Rhythmic gymnastics
- Country represented: Azerbaijan
- Club: Ojaq Sports Club
- Head coach: Mariana Vasileva
- Assistant coach: Valentina Ukleina
Medal record
Representing Azerbaijan
Rhythmic Gymnastics
Junior World Championships
Bronze medal – third place	2023 Cluj-Napoca	5 Balls
Bronze medal – third place	2023 Cluj-Napoca	5 Ropes
Bronze medal – third place	2023 Cluj-Napoca	Group All-Around
Junior European Championships
Bronze medal – third place	2023 Baku	All-Around
Bronze medal – third place	2023 Baku	5 Balls
Bronze medal – third place	2024 Budapest	Team

Govhar Ibrahimova (born 13 April 2009) is an Azerbaijani rhythmic gymnast. She's a European and Junior World medalist.

== Career ==
=== Junior ===
In 2022, she won silver medal in all-around at Azerbaijani National Championships. She also won gold in clubs, silver in hoop and ball, and bronze medal in ribbon final.

She was a member of the national junior group in 2023, competing at the European Championships in Baku where Ilaha, along Madina Aslanova, Ilaha Bahadirova, Sakinakhanim Ismayilzada, Zahra Jafarova and Ayan Sadigova, won bronze in the All-Around and with 5 balls. In July the group won bronze in the All-Around, behind Bulgaria and Israel, and won again bronze in the two event finals at the 2nd Junior World Championships in Cluj-Napoca.

In 2024, she switched to the individual modality, taking part in the 1st Rhythmic Gymnastics European Cup in Baku, where she took 7th place in the junior hoop final. On 22 May she won team bronze with Shams Aghahuseynova, Fidan Gurbanli and Ilaha Bahadirova at the European Championships in Budapest.

=== Senior ===
In 2025, Govhar was age-eligeble to compete as a senior. She represented Azerbaijan at the 2025 European Championships in Tallinn, Estonia. She competed only with two apparatus, taking 47th place in hoop and 33rd place in clubs qualifications. Together with Kamilla Seyidyade, Zahra Jafarova and senior group she took 15th place in team competition.

She started the 2026 season competing at AGF Trophy International tournament in Baku, where she got bronze medals in hoop and ribbon finals.
