= Amalia Lică =

Romanian rhythmic gymnast

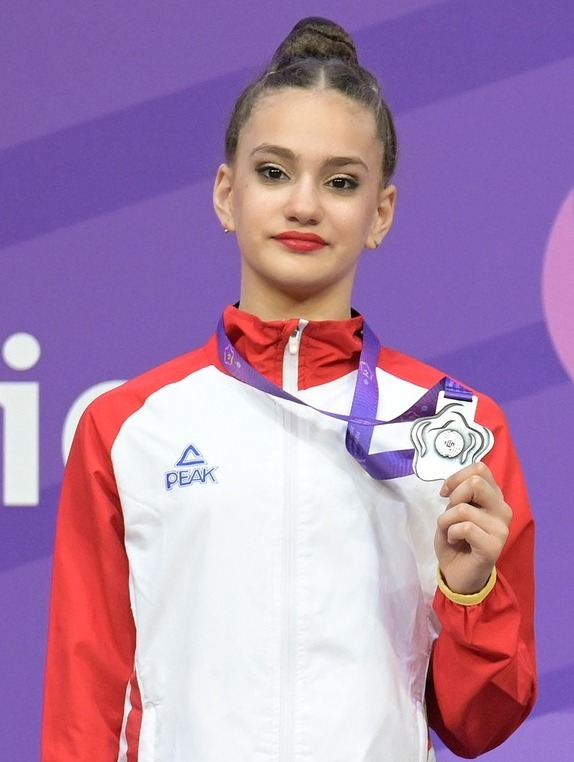

Personal information
- Full name: Amalia Maria Lică
- Born: 11 May 2009 (age 17) Bucharest, Romania

Gymnastics career
- Discipline: Rhythmic gymnastics
- Country represented: Romania; (2022-)
- Club: ACS Dandri
- Head coach: Adriana Mitroi
Medal record
Rhythmic Gymnastics
Representing Romania
Event	1st	2nd	3rd
FIG World Cup	0	0	1
Total	0	0	1
World Championships
Silver medal – second place	2025 Rio de Janeiro	Clubs
Junior World Championships
Silver medal – second place	2023 Cluj-Napoca	Hoop
Bronze medal – third place	2023 Cluj-Napoca	Team
Junior European Championships
Gold medal – first place	2022 Tel Aviv	Clubs
Gold medal – first place	2024 Budapest	Team
Gold medal – first place	2024 Budapest	Hoop
Gold medal – first place	2024 Budapest	Clubs
Gold medal – first place	2024 Budapest	Ribbon
Silver medal – second place	2022 Tel Aviv	Team
European Cup
Silver medal – second place	2024 Baku	Junior Hoop
Silver medal – second place	2024 Baku	Junior Clubs
Silver medal – second place	2025 Burgas	Clubs
Bronze medal – third place	2024 Baku	Junior Team
Bronze medal – third place	2024 Baku	Junior Ribbon
Bronze medal – third place	2025 Baku	Ribbon
Bronze medal – third place	2025 Burgas	Hoop

Amalia Maria Lică (born 11 May 2009) is a Romanian rhythmic gymnast. She became the first junior European Champion for Romania by winning gold with clubs in 2022. She is also the 2025 World silver medalist with clubs.

== Early life ==
Lică began gymnastics at age 5. Her mother saw her dancing around the house and first took her to ballet classes, then enrolled her in rhythmic gymnastics.

== Career ==
Lică made her international debut in 2021, when she participated in the Irina Deleanu Cup.

=== Junior ===
==== 2022 ====
In 2022, she became a junior. Her first competition was the Grand Prix in Moscow, where she won silver in the team competition. She also took part in the International Sofia Tournament, where she won silver with ribbon, and the Irina Deleanu Cup, where she won gold in all-around. In June she was selected for her first European Championships in Tel Aviv, Israel. There she won silver in teams with Christina Dragan. Individually, she won a historical gold in the clubs apparatus final, which made her the first junior individual European Champion from Romania.

==== 2023 ====
In 2023, she made her debut competing in the Italian Serie A championship, joining the club Eurogymnica Torino. In March she won bronze with clubs and gold with hoop at the Fellbach-Schminden tournament. A week later she won four golds at the Aphrodite Cup in Athens.

==== 2024 ====
The next season, Lică competed at the 2024 European Cup Baku, where she won bronze medal in the team competition. Individually, she won silver medals with hoop and clubs and a bronze medal with ribbon. At the 2024 European Championships, she won the junior team gold along with Lisa Garac, then won three of the four junior apparatus finals in hoop, clubs, and ribbon. In October, she won the Romanian junior national title in the all-around.

=== Senior ===
==== 2025 ====
In 2025, she became a senior. On March 7-9, she competed at International Tournament Bosphorus Cup in Istanbul, Turkey and placed 14th in All-around. She won silver in Team competition together with Andreea Verdes. On 4-6 April, she competed at 2025 World Cup Sofia, she big mistakes her ribbon routine and took 42nd place in the all-around and did not advance into apparatus finals. On April 18-20, she competed at Baku World Cup, where she took 40th place in all-around.

She was selected to represent Romania together with Andreea Verdes at the 2025 European Championships in Tallinn, Estonia. She took 14th place in the all-around final. She qualified to ribbon final, finishing 8th. In July, she competed at the Milan World Cup, where she took 29th place in the all-around. On July 25-27, she competed at the Cluj-Napoca World Challenge Cup and finished 7th in the all-around. She took 4th place in clubs and 8th in ribbon final.

In August, she represented Romania at the 2025 World Championships in Rio de Janeiro, Brazil, and took 17th place in the all-around final. She qualified to clubs final, where she won a historic silver medal, the first World Championship medal of any color for Romania since Irina Deleanu, who won a bronze in 1992. In October, she competed in the Aeon Cup in Tokyo with teammates Ileana Dutu and Patricia Stanciu, where the ACS Dandri Bucharest took 5th place in team competition. In the senior all-around, Lică won the bronze medal behind Taisiia Onofriichuk and Rin Keys.

==== 2026 ====
Amalia started the season competing at Sofia World Cup, where she took 27th place in all-around. In April, she competed at Tashkent World Cup and took 21st place in all-around. In May, she lost cross battle against Sofia Raffaeli in 1st round at European Cup in Baku, Azerbaijan. She was 7th with ribbon. In the end of May, she competed at the 2026 European Championships in Varna, and finished on 18th place in the all-around final. Together with Andreea Verdeș and senior group she took 10th place in team competition. She qualified to clubs final and ended on 5th place.

In June, Amalia took 6th place in all-around at World Challenge Cup Cluj-Napoca. She qualified to three apparatus finals, winning bronze medal in ball, and placing 6th in hoop and ribbon. In July, she took 15th place in all-around at Milan World Cup. In August, she represented Romania at the 2026 World Championships in Frankfurt, Germany. She took 25th place in all-around qualifications and did not reach all-around final. Her best result was with hoop (18th place).

== Achievements ==
- First Romanian rhythmic gymnast to win a gold medal in an individual apparatus final at the European Championships.
- First (and only) Romanian rhythmic gymnast to win an individual medal at the Junior World Championships.
- First (and only) Romanian rhythmic gymnast to win a silver medal in an individual apparatus final at World Championships.

== Routine music information ==
Year	Apparatus	Music Title
2026	Hoop	The Heat by Peter Gabriel
2026	Ball	
2026	Clubs (first)	Bocca di rosa by musica nuda
2026	Clubs (second)	Wepa by Gloria Estefan
2026	Ribbon	Dragostea Din Tei (Radu Sirbu Remix) by O-Zone
2025	Hoop	Prologue by Woodkid
2025	Ball	
2025	Clubs	Wepa by Gloria Estefan
2025	Ribbon	Golden Cage by Gabriel Saban & Sandia
2024	Hoop	Prologue by Woodkid
2024	Ball	Beethoven's 5 Secrets by The Piano Guys
2024	Clubs	Crown of Vengeance, Lock And Key, Nexus by Timothy Shortell and Caleb Jordan Swift
2024	Ribbon	I NEED YOU by Jon Batiste
2023	Hoop	Chopin: Fantasie by Robert Wells
2023	Ball	Beethoven's 5 Secrets by The Piano Guys
2023	Clubs	Crown of Vengeance, Lock And Key, Nexus by Timothy Shortell and Caleb Jordan Swift
2023	Ribbon	I NEED YOU by Jon Batiste
2022	Hoop	Fantaisie-Impromptu in C-Sharp Minor op. 66 by Johan Åhlén
2022	Ball	Planetarium by Justin Hurwitz
2022	Clubs	Adiós by Benjamin Clementine
2022	Ribbon	Long Tall Sally by Cagey Strings
2021	Hoop	Chopin: Fantasie by Robert Wells
2021	Ball	Planetarium by Justin Hurwitz
2021	Clubs	Adiós by Benjamin Clementine
2021	Ribbon	Long Tall Sally by Cagey Strings

== Competitive highlights ==
(Team competitions in seniors are held only at the World Championships, Europeans and other Continental Games.)

International: Senior
Year	Event	AA	Team	Hoop	Ball	Clubs	Ribbon
2025	World Championships	17th		12th (Q)	19th (Q)	2nd	19th (Q)
2025	World Challenge Cup Cluj-Napoca	7th		9th (Q)	12th (Q)	4th	8th
2025	World Cup Milan	29th		32nd (Q)	36th (Q)	28th (Q)	26th (Q)
2025	European Championships	14th					8th
2025	European Cup Burgas			3rd	4th	2nd	
2025	European Cup Baku			4th		7th	3rd
2025	World Cup Baku	40th		38th (Q)	39th (Q)	29th (Q)	48th (Q)
2025	World Cup Sofia	42nd		35th (Q)	12th (Q)	28th (Q)	82nd (Q)
International: Junior
Year	Event	AA	Team	Hoop	Ball	Clubs	Ribbon
2024	Junior European Championships		1st	1st		1st	1st
2024	European Cup Baku		3rd	2nd		2nd	3rd
2023	Junior World Championships		3rd	2nd		5th	4th
2023	IT Aphrodite Cup	1st		3rd	1st	1st	1st
2023	IT Fellbach-Schminden			1st		3rd	
2022	Junior European Championships		2nd			1st	
National: Junior
Year	Event	AA	Team	Hoop	Ball	Clubs	Ribbon
2024	Romanian National Championships	1st					
2023	Romanian National Championships	1st					
2022	Romanian National Championships	1st					
Q = Qualifications (Did not advance to Event Final due to the 2 gymnast per country rule, only Top 8 highest score); WR = World Record; WD = Withdrew; NT = No Team Competition; OC = Out of Competition(competed but scores not counted for qualifications/results)
