= Shams Aghahuseynova =

Azerbaijani rhythmic gymnast

- Born: 12 June 2010 (age 16)

Gymnastics career
- Discipline: Rhythmic gymnastics
- Country represented: Azerbaijan
- Club: Ojaq Sports Club
- Head coach: Nigar Abdusalimova
Medal record
Representing Azerbaijan
Rhythmic Gymnastics
Junior European Championships
Bronze medal – third place	2024 Budapest	Team
European Cup
Silver medal – second place	2025 Burgas	Ribbon
Silver medal – second place	2024 Baku	Ribbon
Bronze medal – third place	2025 Baku	Ribbon
Gymnasiades
Silver medal – second place	Bahrain 2024	All-around
Silver medal – second place	Bahrain 2024	Ribbon
Bronze medal – third place	Bahrain 2024	Hoop

Shams Aghahuseynova (Azerbaijani: Şəms Ağahüseynova; born 12 June 2010) is an Azerbaijani rhythmic gymnast. She represents her country in international competitions.

== Career ==
Shams made her international debut in 2023, when she was selected to represent Azerbaijan at the 2nd Junior World Championships in Cluj-Napoca. There she was 7th in teams along Nazrin Abdullayeva and Nuray Ahmadzada, 13th with hoop and 21st with ball.

In 2024 she participated in the Gymnastik International Tournament in Schminden, where she took bronze in teams and silver with ribbon. A couple of months later she took part in the 1st Rhythmic Gymnastics European Cup in Baku, where she took silver in the junior ribbon final. On 22 May she won team bronze with Ilaha Bahadirova, Fidan Gurbanli and Govhar Ibrahimova at the European Championships in Budapest. In late October she competed at the Gymnasiade in Bahrain, winning silver in the All-Around.

In 2025, she competed at the 2025 Junior World Championships and took 15th place in ribbon. She was 10th in team competition together with Azada Atakishiyeva and Fidan Gurbanli.
