= Vera Tugolukova =

Cypriot rhythmic gymnast (born 2008)

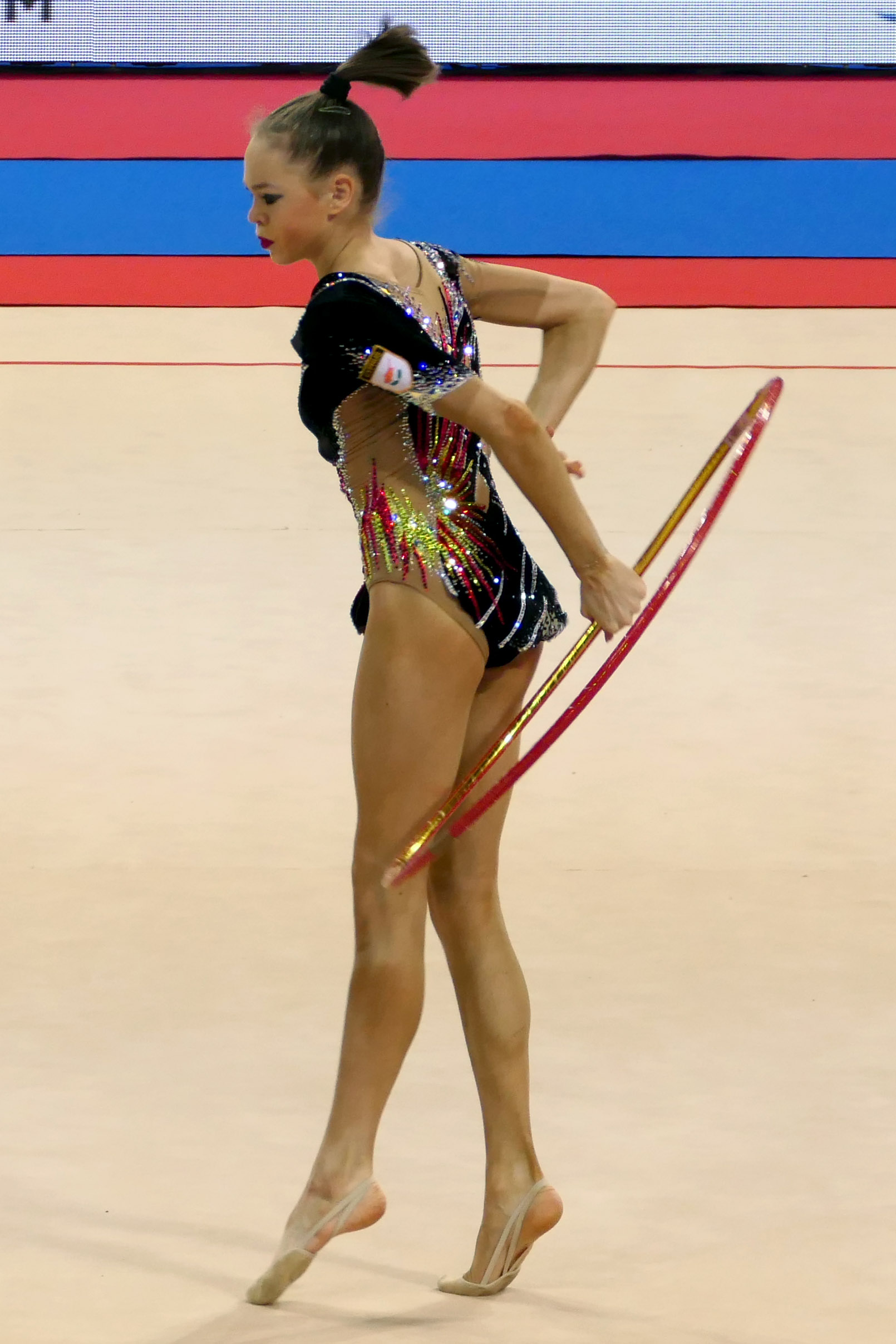
- Tugolukova in 2024

Personal information
- Full name: Vera Aleksandrovna Tugolukova
- Nickname: Verochka
- Born: 16 September 2008 (age 17) Moscow, Russia

Gymnastics career
- Discipline: Rhythmic gymnastics
- Country represented: Cyprus; (2023–present)
- Former countries represented: Russia
- Training location: Novogorsk, Russia
- Club: Andreas Trikomitis Club
- Head coaches: Elena Nefedova, Chrystalleni Trikomiti
- Former coach: Natalia Sokolova
Medal record
Representing Cyprus
Rhythmic Gymnastics
Event	1st	2nd	3rd
FIG World Cup	1	1	3
FIG World Challenge Cup	0	3	2
European Cup	0	2	3
Total	1	6	8
European Cup
Silver medal – second place	2024 Baku	Ribbon
Silver medal – second place	2025 Burgas	Ball
Bronze medal – third place	2024 Baku	Hoop
Bronze medal – third place	2024 Baku	Clubs
Bronze medal – third place	2026 Baku	Ball

Vera Aleksandrovna Tugolukova (born 16 September 2008) is a Russian-born rhythmic gymnast who has competed for Cyprus in international competitions since 2023. She represented Cyprus at the 2024 Summer Olympics in Women's rhythmic individual all-around and placed 16th in the qualifications for the all around.

== Gymnastics career ==
=== Russia ===
In 2022, Tugolukova won the gold medal with the hoop at the Russian Junior Championships. At the Children of Asia International Sport Games in Vladivostok, she won silver all-around as well as gold in the ribbon final, bronze in the ball final, and silver in the club final.

She could not compete in International Gymnastics Federation (FIG) sponsored competitions due to the suspension of Russian athletes following the Russian invasion of Ukraine. In November 2022, the FIG announced that Tugolukova had changed her nationality to Cyprus. Irina Viner, head coach of the Russian rhythmic gymnastics team, noted that Tugolukova's parents had moved to Cyprus.

=== Cyprus ===
==== 2023 ====
Tugolukova joined the Cypriot national team as a junior in 2023 and her first international competition representing Cyprus was in March at the Aphrodite Cup in Athens, Greece, finishing fifth in the all-around in her age category and winning silver in the hoop final. Then at the Sofia Cup, she won two golds in the ball and club finals and silver in the ribbon final, while in hoop she was fifth. In the AGF Trophy in Baku, Azerbaijan, she won gold medals in the all-around and with the hoop and silver medals in the ball and clubs finals.

Tugolukova was selected to compete at the 2023 Junior World Championships in Cluj-Napoca, Romania. She competed with hoop, ball, and clubs, while her teammate, Nika Khodareva, did so with the ribbon. Tugolukova qualified for three apparatus finals and finished seventh in hoop, fifth in ball, and sixth in clubs.

==== 2024 ====
Tugolukova became age-eligible for senior competitions in 2024. She made her senior debut at the Palaio Faliro World Cup and finished sixth in the all-around. In the apparatus finals, she won a bronze medal in the ribbon final, which was the first-ever medal for Cyprus on the FIG World Cup series. At her next event, the Sofia World Cup, she finished 14th in the all-around. She then won three medals at the first edition of the European Cup in Baku: silver with the ribbon and bronze with the hoop and clubs.

At the 2024 European Championships in Budapest, she finished 11th in the all-around during the qualification round. As the highest-ranked gymnast from a country that had not already qualified, Tugolukova earned the continental berth for the 2024 Summer Olympics ahead of Poland's Liliana Lewińska. The Polish Gymnastics Federation protested the results and filed appeals to the International Gymnastics Federation (FIG) and the Gymnastics Ethics Foundation. Tugolukova's Olympic qualification was confirmed by the FIG on 4 June. She finished 16th in the all-around final, fourth in the clubs final, and seventh in the ball final.

In August, Vera competed at the 2024 Summer Olympics. She was the youngest gymnast in the entire rhythmic gymnastics competition. She ended the qualification round in 16th place and did not advance to the final.

==== 2025 ====
In February 2025, Evangelia Trikomiti, who was president of the superior jury at the 2024 European Championships, was banned from the sport for four years after the FIG ruled she had altered the scores at the competition to ensure Tugolukova finished in the Olympic qualification place.

On 4-6 April, she competed at Sofia World Cup, where she took 13th place in all-around and placed 6th in ribbon final. On April 18-20, she competed at the Baku World Cup and finished 7th in all-around. She qualified to three apparatus finals and won silver in hoop, gold in ball and took 5th place in clubs. She competed in the Pharaoh's Cup in Cairo, Egypt, winning four gold medals. She competed in the Rhythmic Gymnastics European Cup in Burgas, where she won a silver medal in ball and a bronze medal in ribbon. She qualified for the cross-battle in third place, reaching the quarterfinals, but was defeated by Dara Stoyanova in hoop. From June 5-8, she competed in the 2025 Rhythmic Gymnastics European Championships in Tallinn, Estonia. She qualified for all four apparatus finals. She finished seventh in the all-around final. She returned to international competition at the World Cup in Milan on July 18, where she finished sixth in the all-around. She won a bronze medal in the ribbon final and finished eighth in the hoop final.

In August, Tugolukova competed in the World Championships in Rio de Janeiro, placing 26th in the All-Around after making mistakes in all four routines.

==== 2026 ====
On 28-30 March, she competed at Sofia World Cup, where she took 10th place in all-around. She qualified to ball final, finishing 5th. On April 10-12, she achieved 5th place in all-around at Tashkent World Cup. She was 8th in hoop, 6th in ball and 4th in ribbon final. On May 15-17, she competed at Portimao World Challenge Cup and took 4th place in all-around. In finals, she won two silver medals (clubs, ribbon) and one bronze (ball).

In the end of May, she represented Cyprus alongside Maria Avgousti at the 2026 European Championships in Varna, Bulgaria. Together with senior group they took 11th place in team competition. She placed 9th in all-around final, but did not advance into any apparatus finals. In June, she competed at World Challenge Cup Cluj-Napoca and took 5th place in all-around. She won silver medal in clubs final and bronze in ball.

== Achievements ==
- First Cypriot rhythmic gymnast to win a medal in an individual apparatus final at the FIG World Cup series.
- First Cypriot rhythmic gymnast to win a gold medal in an individual apparatus final at the FIG World Cup series.

== Competitive history ==
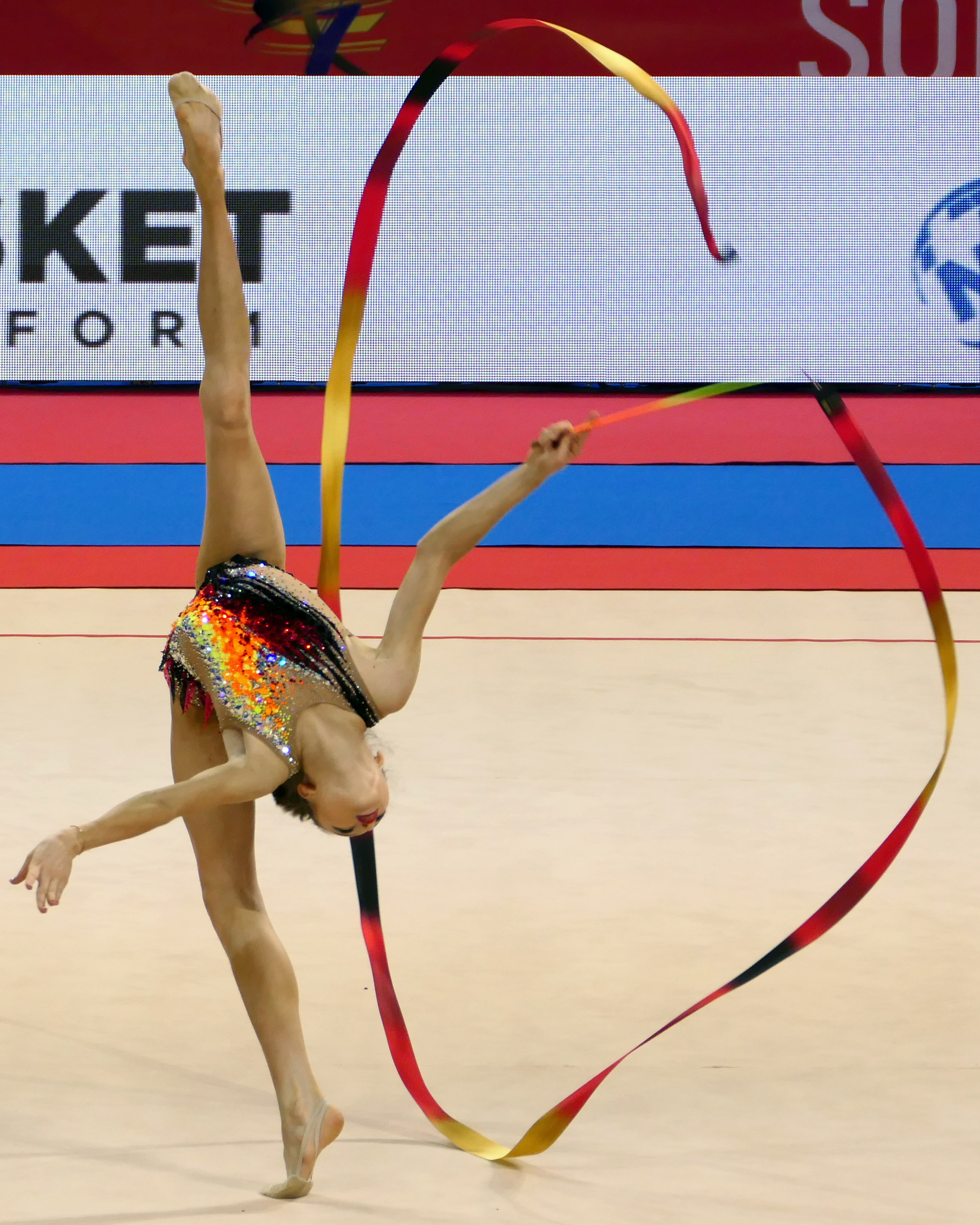
Tugolukova performing her ribbon routine at the 2024 Sofia World Cup

Year	Event	Team	AA	HP	BA	CL	RB
Junior
Representing Russia
2022	Russian Junior Championships	1st place, gold medalist(s)		1st place, gold medalist(s)			
2022	Children of Asia International Sport Games		2nd place, silver medalist(s)		3rd place, bronze medalist(s)	2nd place, silver medalist(s)	1st place, gold medalist(s)
Representing Cyprus
2023	Aphrodite Cup		5	2nd place, silver medalist(s)			
2023	Sofia Cup		4	5	1st place, gold medalist(s)	1st place, gold medalist(s)	2nd place, silver medalist(s)
2023	AGF Trophy		1st place, gold medalist(s)	1st place, gold medalist(s)	2nd place, silver medalist(s)	2nd place, silver medalist(s)	
2023	Junior World Championships			7	5	6	
Senior
2024	Palaio Faliro World Cup		6				3rd place, bronze medalist(s)
2024	Sofia World Cup		14				
2024	European Cup			3rd place, bronze medalist(s)		3rd place, bronze medalist(s)	2nd place, silver medalist(s)
2024	European Championships		16		7	4	
2024	Olympic Games		16				

== Routine music information ==
Year	Apparatus	Music title
2026	Hoop	Be Italian by Fergie
2026	Ball	Only You, Rock Around the Clock / Blue Suede Shoes by Brenda Lee, Dany Brillant
2026	Clubs	Wonder Woman, a Call to Stand / A World Awakened by Junxie XL
2026	Ribbon	Cinderella Honeymoon from Hiromi Iwasaki
2025	Hoop	E lucevan le stelle (da "Tosca") by Federico Paciotti
2025	Ball	Mein Herr by Kelli Barrett & The Kit Kat Girls
2025	Clubs	Nao Deixe O Samba Morrer / Samba Do Mundo (Fatboy Slim Presents Gregor Salto) [feat. Saxsymbol & Todorov] by Alcione
2025	Ribbon	One Thousand and One Nights from Scheherazade
2024	Hoop	"Misirlou" by David Garrett
2024	Hoop (second)	Sous le ciel de Paris (song) by Mireille Mathieu
2024	Ball	"Seven Nation Army" by Postmodern Jukebox (feat. Haley Reinhart)
2024	Clubs	The 5th by David Garrett
2024	Ribbon	The Firebird: Ep 16. Danse infernale de tous les sujets de Kastchei by Chicago Symphony Orchestra
2023	Hoop	"Miserlou" by Caroline Campbell and William Joseph (feat. Tina Guo)
2023	Ball	"Mama" by Dalida
2023	Clubs	"Macarena" by Los del Rio
2023	Ribbon	"Gelato Al Cioccolato" by Enzo Ghinazzi
2022	Hoop	Game Rhapsody by David Garrett
2022	Ball	Come prima (Weekend à Rome) by Dany Brillant
2022	Clubs	Bella Ciao by David Garrett
2022	Ribbon	"Gelato Al Cioccolato" by Enzo Ghinazzi

== See also ==
- Nationality changes in gymnastics
