= Christina Dragan =

Romanian-American rhythmic gymnast

- Born: 19 April 2007 (age 19) Orange County, California, United States

Gymnastics career
- Discipline: Rhythmic gymnastics
- Country represented: Romania (2020-2025)
- Club: Sportul Studentesc Bucuresti / Nimble Rhythmic Gymnastics
- Head coach: Alexandra Piscupescu
Medal record
Representing Romania
Rhythmic Gymnastics
Junior European Championships
Silver medal – second place	2022 Tel Aviv	Team
Bronze medal – third place	2022 Tel Aviv	Ball
European Cup
Silver medal – second place	2024 Baku	Ball

Christina Dragan (born 19 April 2007) is a Romanian-American rhythmic gymnast. She is the 2022 European Junior silver medalist in team and bronze medalist with ball. She was also an Olympic alternate at 2024 Paris Olympics to her older sister Annaliese Dragan. Dragan is now currently studying at the University of California, Los Angeles.

== Personal life ==
Dragan began the sport following in her sister Annaliese's footsteps. Their parents are Romanian, and in 2019, the sisters were invited to compete for the Romanian federation. They represented Romania together at the 2020 European Championship.

== Career ==
During her time in the United States, she took 9th place in all-around in her age group at Vitry Stars Cup, 4th place in all-around at Koop Cup in Canada and won bronze medal in all-around at the 2019 Chicago Cup.

=== Junior ===
Dragan made her debut for Romania at the 2020 Irina Deleanu Cup. She was 4th in the team competition with her sister, and individually, she ended 4th with rope, 11th with ball, 6th with clubs and 4th with ribbon. In October she beat her sister to become the national champion in the junior category and won silver at the Romanian Cup a few weeks later.

Her first major international competition was the 2020 European Championship in Kyiv, Ukraine. She finished 10th in the all-around just behind her sister and was the first reserve for the ball final.

In 2021 she repeated her national title and won many medals in international tournaments, including silver medal in clubs at Irina Deleanu Cup.

In 2022 she joined her sister at the European Championship once again; Annaliese competed in the senior category. Dragan performed with hoop and ball and qualified for both event finals. In the qualification round, she had the second highest hoop score (30.95). In the team event, she and her teammate Amalia Lică won silver, only the second medals for Romania in a junior European Championship and the first since 1993, behind Israel and above Bulgaria. The next day, Dragan also won bronze in the ball final. In November, she won silver medal in all-around behind Lică at Junior National Championships.

=== Senior ===
Dragan became a senior in 2023. She made her senior debut at the World Cup in Tashkent, where she took 19th place in the all-around. In July, she competed at World Challenge Cup Cluj-Napoca and ended on 14th place in all-around.

In 2024, she began her season competing at Irina Deleanu Cup in February, where she won gold medal in all-around in front of a teammate Sabina Enache. She also won gold medals in all apparatus finals but clubs, where she won silver. Later, she competed at the European Cup in Baku, and won silver medal in ball. She and her sister represented Romania at the 2024 European Championships in Budapest. Christina took 31st place in all-around qualifications and did not advance into the all-around final. They took 13th place in team competition. In June, she competed at Milan World Cup and placed 29th in all-around.

In October 2024, there was a dispute between Irina Deleanu, the president of the Romanian Rhythmic Gymnastics Federation, and Dragan's father, who accused Deleanu of abusing Dragan, her sister, and other athletes. Following this dispute, Dragan was removed from the Romanian national team and given only two hours a day for training. In December, she competed in the Winter Cup in Leverkusen and won first place.

In January 2025, several Romanian rhythmic gymnasts came forward with allegations of abuse from coaches. Among them was Dragan, who alleged that she had witnessed other gymnasts being insulted and that Deleanu had called her "a whore" when she was only fourteen years old.

In May, she returned to international stage competing at International tournament Gdynia Rhythmic Stars in Poland. She was 8th in all-around, 6th in ribbon and 8th in hoop final.

== Routine music information ==
Year	Apparatus	Music Title
2024	Hoop	Floris Folium by Mattia Turzo
2024	Ball	Charms by Abel Korzeniowski
2024	Clubs	
2024	Ribbon	
2023	Hoop	Skyfall by Adele
2023	Ball	Nature Boy by Céline Dion
2023	Clubs	Forever Young by Alphaville
2023	Ribbon	Una Noche Mas by Yasmin Levy
2022	Hoop	Hallelujah by Alexandra Burke
2022	Ball	The Forest Queen by Peter Gundry
2022	Clubs	Bei Mir Bist Du Schoen by The Hot Sardines
2022	Ribbon	
2020	Rope	
2020	Ball	George Valentin by The Brussels Philharmonic & The Orchestra Of Flanders
2020	Clubs	I'm Still Standing by Taron Egerton
2020	Ribbon	Padam, Padam by Mireille Mathieu
