= Andreea Verdeș =

Romanian rhythmic gymnast

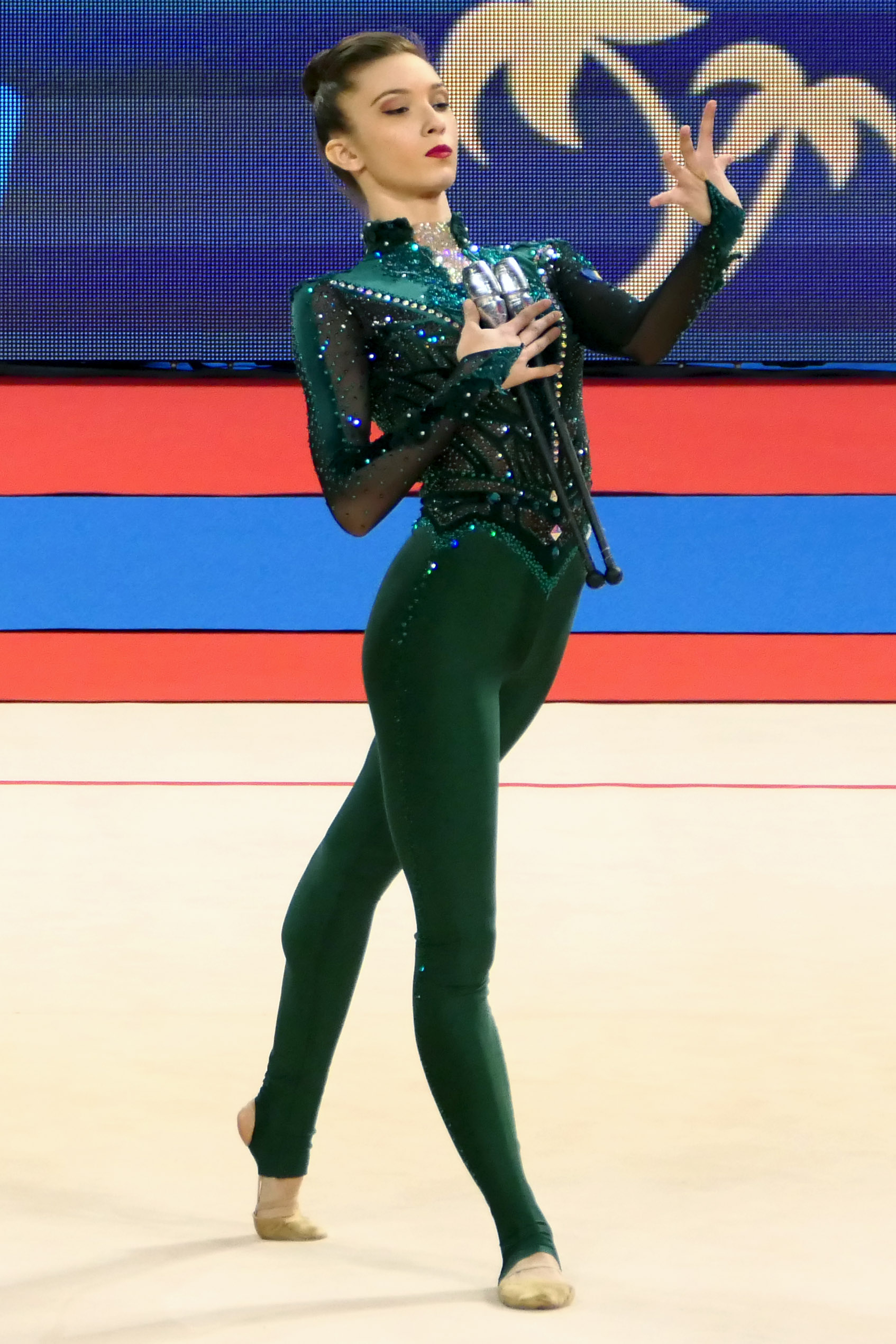
- Verdes in 2024

Personal information
- Full name: Andreea Cristina Verdeș
- Nickname: Verdeșika
- Born: 18 October 2000 (age 26) Iași, Romania

Gymnastics career
- Discipline: Rhythmic gymnastics
- Country represented: Romania; (2017–present)
- Club: Corrado Iași Club
- Head coach: Catalina Radu
- Assistant coach: Constantin Radu

Andreea Cristina Verdeș (born 18 October 2000) is a Romanian individual rhythmic gymnast. On national level, she is the 2024 and 2026 Romanian All-around champion.

== Personal life ==
She was introduced to rhythmic gymnastics by her grandparents at the age of 5. In 2024, she got a master's degree in physical education at Alexandru Ioan Cuza University in Iași, Romania.

== Career ==
=== Senior ===
==== 2017-2021 Olympic cycle ====
In 2017, she became a senior. She made a debut at World Cup Pesaro and took 54th place in All-around. At World Challenge Cup Berlin she took 12th place in All-around and almost reached Ribbon final - 9th place. She represented Romania at the 2017 European Championships in Budapest, Hungary. Her best result was 18th place with Clubs. Later that year she competed at the 2017 World Championships in Pesaro, Italy. She placed 33rd in All-around Qualifications and did not advance into Finals.

She competed at the 2019 European Championships in Baku, Azerbaijan. She took 15th place in All-around. On June 22, Andreea represented Romania at the 2019 European Games in Minsk, Belarus and finished on 9th place in All-around. She advanced into Ribbon final and took 5th place behind Katsiaryna Halkina.

In 2021, Verdes placed 12th in the all-around at World Cup Baku and was fourth place in qualifying for one of three spots for the Tokyo 2020 Olympics before the last World Cup. At the last World Cup in Pesaro, she was 21st in the all-around and did not win one of the Olympic quotas. At the 2021 European Championships, she qualified to the all-around final in 14th place. She ultimately did not qualify to the Olympics due to her placement below the Hungarian Fanni Pigniczki, who earned the European Continental quota to the Olympics instead.

From October 27 to 31, she competed at the 2021 World Championships in Kitakyushu, Japan, and ended in 15th place in All-around qualifications. For the first time she advance into All-around final, where she made some mistakes and finished 18th.

==== 2022-2024 Olympic Cycle ====
In 2022, Andreea reached Ribbon final at 2022 Pesaro World Cup, where she ended on 7th place. She also placed 10th in All-around. She represented Romania at the 2022 European Championships in Tel Aviv, Israel and was 19th in All-around. She competed the 2022 World Championships in Sofia, Bulgaria, where she placed 19th in All-around. For the first time, she advanced into Apparatus finals at World Championships. She took 8th place in Ball final.

She competed at the 2023 European Championships in Baku, Azerbaijan, and took 21st place in All-around. Together with teammate Annaliese Dragan they placed 11th in Team competition. At the 2023 World Championships in Valencia, Spain, she finished 20th place in All-around qualifications. She did not qualify to All-around final. In September, she won gold medal in All-around and all Apparatus finals at Balkan Championships.

In 2024, Andreea competed at Sofia World Cup and placed 26th in All-around. She represented Romania together with Annaliese Dragan and Christina Dragan at the 2024 European Championships in Budapest, Hungary, and took 13th place in Team competition. She competed only with Ribbon - 20th place in Qualifications. In October, she won gold medal in All-around at Romanian National Championship.

==== 2025-2028 Olympic Cycle ====
In 2025, on March 7-9, she competed at International Tournament Bosphorus Cup in Istanbul, Turkey and won silver medal in All-around. She also won silver in Team competition with Amalia Lică. She was selected to represent Romania together with Amalia Lică at the 2025 European Championships in Tallinn, Estonia. She took 17th place in the all-around final. On July 17-19, she took 11th place in the all-around at the 2025 Summer Universiade in Essen. In hoop final, she finished 4th, only 0.05 point behind podium. On July 25-27, she competed at the Cluj-Napoca World Challenge Cup and finished 16th in the all-around.

In 2026, she started the season competing at Aphrodite Cup in Greece and won silver medal in all-around behind Akmaral Yerekesheva. She also won gold medal in ball and bronze in hoop final. In April, she competed at IT Sofia Cup and won gold in ribbon, silver in hoop and all-around, and bronze in clubs finals.

== Routine music information ==
Year	Apparatus	Music title
2017	Hoop	OST from Master & Margarita by Igor Korneliuk
2017	Ball	Show Me How You Burlesque by Christina Aguilera
2017	Clubs	Suat'a by Okay Temiz
2017	Ribbon	Malagueña
2018	Hoop	Night On Bald Mountain/Night On Disco Mountain by Sir Adrian Boult/David Shire
2018	Ball	I Will Not Die by Ingrid Kup
2018	Clubs	I Love Señoritas by Alex Swings Oscar Sings!
2018	Ribbon	Malagueña
2019	Hoop	Night On Bald Mountain/Night On Disco Mountain by Sir Adrian Boult/David Shire
2019	Ball	Aire by Leslie Grace
2019	Clubs	Suat'a by Okay Temiz
2019	Ribbon	Corazon Encadenado by Gisselle y Sergio Vargas
2020	Hoop	Dangerous by David Garrett
2020	Ball	You Don't Own Me by Saygrace feat. G-Eazy
2020	Clubs	Piazzolla: Libertango by Tango for Four
2020	Ribbon	Blue Eternity
2021	Hoop	Dangerous by David Garrett
2021	Ball	You Don't Own Me by Saygrace feat. G-Eazy
2021	Clubs	Piazzolla: Libertango by Tango for Four
2021	Ribbon	Blue Eternity
2022	Hoop	Hurt by Christina Aguilera
2022	Ball	не твоя війна by Okean Elzy
2022	Clubs	Unleashed (Amanda Duet Version) by Epica
2022	Ribbon	Se Dice De Mi (Betty la fea) by Yolanda Rayo
2023	Hoop	Hurt by Christina Aguilera
2023	Ball	Снег by Elena Vaenga
2023	Clubs	Unleashed (Amanda Duet Version) by Epica
2023	Ribbon	Se Dice De Mi (Betty la fea) by Yolanda Rayo
2024	Hoop	Giant Plasma Tubes Floating Above the Earth Blues by The Holy Club / Ramkoph's Dance by Roman Surzha
2024	Ball	Suerte de la gonlondrina (Bulerias) by Gerardo Nuñez
2024	Clubs	Trial Before Pilate by Victor Brox, Ian Gillan & Barry Dennen
2024	Ribbon	Never Tear Us Apart by Never Tear Us Apart
2025	Hoop	À nos folies by Léa Paci
2025	Ball	Suerte de la gonlondrina (Bulerias) by Gerardo Nuñez
2025	Clubs	Guarda che luna- In cerca di te by Irene Grandi
2026	Hoop	À nos folies by Léa Paci
2026	Ball	A couple in a Café by Mikael Tariverdiev
2026	Clubs	Firebird suite by Atlanta Symphony Orchestra, Robert Shaw
2026	Ribbon	Masquerade by Yuri Ahronovitch, London Symphony Orchestra
