= Anna Khutsishvili =

Georgian-French gymnast (born 2006)

- Born: 17 April 2006 (age 20) Strasbourg, France

Gymnastics career
- Discipline: Rhythmic gymnastics
- Country represented: France (2025-)
- Former countries represented: Georgia
- Club: Strasbourg GRS
- Head coach: Anna Baranova
- Assistant coach: Sara Bayón
- Former coaches: Eliso Bedoshvili, Salome Pazhava
- Choreographer: Gregory Milan
- Last updated on: 8 February 2025.

Anna Khutsishvili (Georgian: ანა ხუციშვილი; born 17 April 2006) is a French-Georgian rhythmic gymnast who represents France as a member of the senior group. She previously represented Georgia.

On national level, she is the 2024 Georgian all-around champion and the 2023 Georgian all-around silver medalist.

== Personal life ==
Khutsishvili was born in Strasbourg, France to Georgian parents and has a dual citizenship (French-Georgian). She fluently speaks French, Georgian and English.

== Career ==
In 2016 Khutsishvili was selected for a training camp of the French federation. A year later she took part in a course organised by European Gymnastics. In 2018 she won bronze in the Espoir category of the French Championships. In 2019, her first year as a junior, she took 8th place at the French national championship.

=== Senior ===
In 2022, she became a senior and decided to compete for Georgia, debuting at the Grand Prix in Moscow and taking 15th place in the all-around. She trained in the club Neli Saladze Academy. In March, she competed at the 34th MTM FIG Tournament in Ljubljana, Slovenia. She placed 4th in the all-around behind British gymnast Marfa Ekimova. In July, she was selected for her first European Championships in Tel Aviv, finishing 34th in the all-around, 32nd with hoop, 33rd with ball and with clubs and 46th with ribbon.

In March 2023 she competed in the World Cup in Athens, placing 40th in the all-around, 37th with hoop, 42nd with ball, 39th with clubs and 43rd with ribbon. In Portimão she was 19th in the all-around, 30th with hoop, 18th with ball, 11th with clubs and 39th with ribbon. At the European Championships in Baku she took 39th place in the all-around, 27th with hoop, 50th with ball and 37th with clubs. Then, a week later, she won gold in the French Club Championships.

In 2024, she became the 2024 Georgian National all-around champion in April. A month later, she participated in the first edition of the European Cup in Baku. In the last 16 cross-battle round with hoop, she lost to Sofia Raffaeli. Weeks later, she competed in the European Championships in Budapest, taking 36th in the all-around, 27th with hoop, 34th with ball, 44th with clubs, 33rd with ribbon and 15th in teams. In June she took part in the World Cup in Milan, where she was 35th overall, 30th with hoop, 36th with ball, 28th with clubs and 35th with ribbon. On October 3 she announced she had made the decision to stop representing Georgia as an individual to become part of the French national senior group.

== Routine music information ==
| Year | Apparatus | Music title |
|---|---|---|
| 2024 | Hoop | Mount Everest from Euphoria by Labrinth |
| 2024 | Ball | Fear (Cinematic Horror Thriller Trailer Dark) by FreshmanSound |
| 2024 | Clubs | Yeah! by Usher |
| 2024 | Ribbon | Time Will Catch Me First by Peter Crowley |
| 2023 | Hoop | Mount Everest from Euphoria by Labrinth |
| 2023 | Ball | Maybe I Maybe You by Scorpion |
| 2023 | Clubs | Cloak and Dagger by Eternal Eclipse |
| 2023 | Ribbon | Indigene by Maxime Rodriguez |
