= Ilaha Bahadirova =

Azerbaijani rhythmic gymnast

- Born: 1 January 2010 (age 16)

Gymnastics career
- Discipline: Rhythmic gymnastics
- Country represented: Azerbaijan
- Club: Ojaq Sports Club
Medal record
Representing Azerbaijan
Rhythmic Gymnastics
Junior World Championships
Bronze medal – third place	2023 Cluj-Napoca	5 Balls
Bronze medal – third place	2023 Cluj-Napoca	5 Ropes
Bronze medal – third place	2023 Cluj-Napoca	Group All-Around
Junior European Championships
Bronze medal – third place	2023 Baku	All-Around
Bronze medal – third place	2023 Baku	5 Balls
Bronze medal – third place	2024 Budapest	Team
European Cup
Silver medal – second place	2024 Baku	Ball

Ilaha Bahadirova (Azerbaijani: İlahə Bahadirova; born 1 January 2010) is an Azerbaijani rhythmic gymnast. She is a junior world medalist.

== Career ==
=== Junior ===
She was a member of the national junior group in 2023, competing at the European Championships in Baku where Ilaha, along Madina Aslanova, Govhar Ibrahimova, Sakinakhanim Ismayilzada, Zahra Jafarova and Ayan Sadigova, won bronze in the All-Around and with 5 balls. In July the group won bronze in the All-Around, behind Bulgaria and Israel, and won again bronze in the two event finals at the 2nd Junior World Championships in Cluj-Napoca.

In 2024 she switched to the individual modality, taking part in the 1st Rhythmic Gymnastics European Cup in Baku, where she took silver in the junior ball final. On 22 May she won team bronze with Shams Aghahuseynova, Fidan Gurbanli and Govhar Ibrahimova at the European Championships in Budapest.

In June 2025 she was selected for the 3rd Junior World Championships in Sofia, competing with ball she took 19th place with the apparatus and 10th in teams.
