= Irina Deleanu =

Romanian rhythmic gymnast (born 1975)

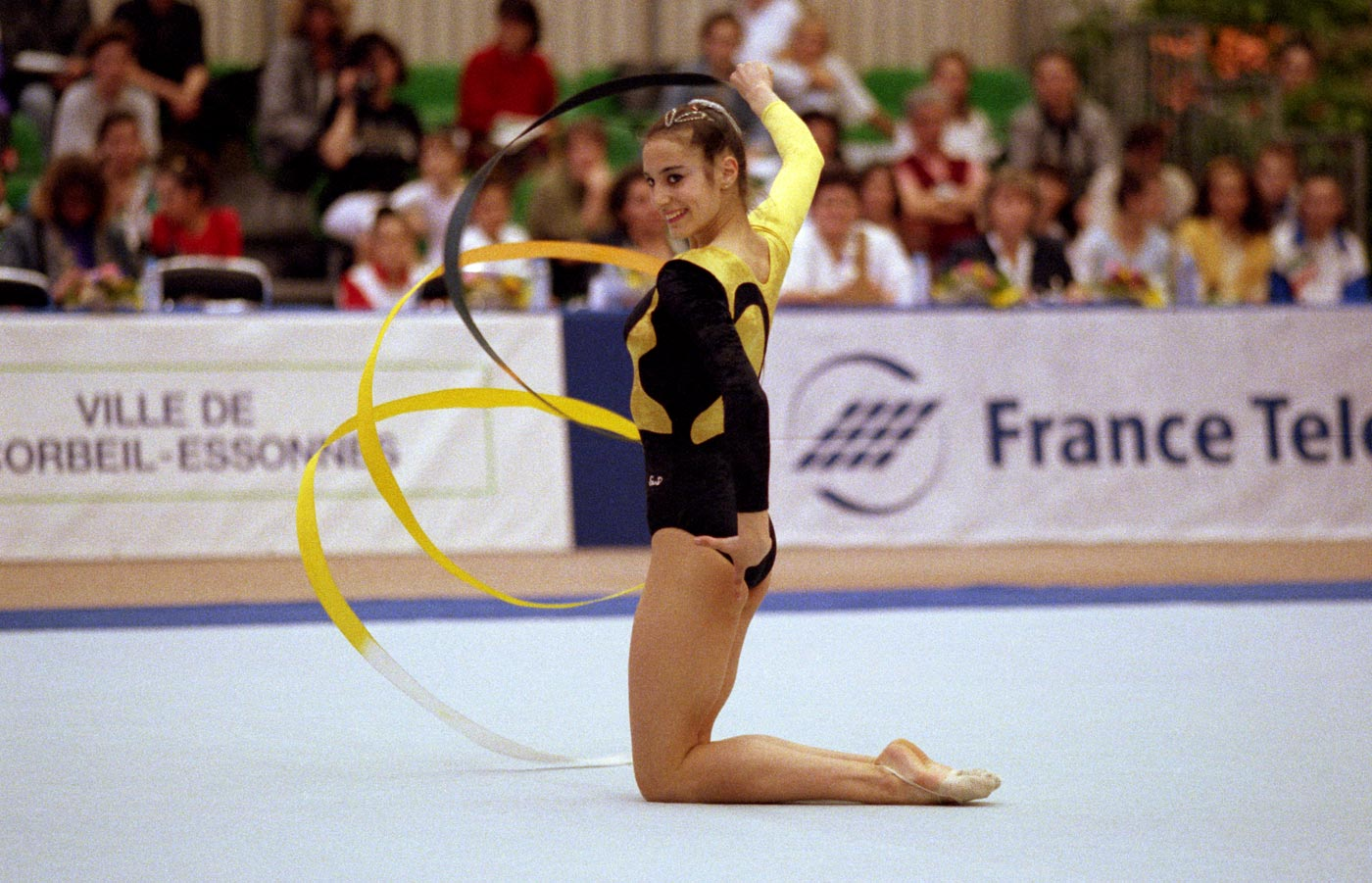
- Irina Deleanu (ROM) at Corbeil-Essonnes (France) tournament, 16 May 1993

Personal information
- Born: 12 November 1975 (age 50)

Gymnastics career
- Discipline: Rhythmic gymnastics
- Country represented: Romania
- Club: Triumf Bucharest
- Head coach: Maria Girba
- Assistant coach: Doina Firca
- Retired: 1993
Medal record
Representing Romania
World Championships
Bronze medal – third place	1992 Brussels	Rope
World Cup Final
Bronze medal – third place	1990 Brussels	Ribbon
European Championships
Bronze medal – third place	1990 Gothenburg	Ball
European Cup Final
Bronze medal – third place	1991 Brussels	Hoop

Irina Deleanu (born 12 November 1975) is a Romanian individual retired rhythmic gymnast. She is currently the president of the Romanian Rhythmic Gymnastics Federation.

== Career ==
In the 1992 World Championships, she won the bronze medal in rope. She retired from the sport in 1993. An annual rhythmic gymnastics competition held in Bucharest is named after her, The Irina Deleanu Cup.

=== Suspension ===
The FIG initiated disciplinary proceedings against Irina Deleanu on 12 March 2012 at the request of the Cyprus Gymnastics Federation damaging the reputation of Cypriot gymnast Chrystalleni Trikomiti, following comments that she made during a television interview with regard to the judging at the Rhythmic Gymnastics qualifying event for London 2012, which took place in January 2012. Deleanu was suspended of her membership of the Technical Committee of the European Gymnastics Union from the date of the said decision until 31 December 2016. The length of the suspension was later reduced until the end of December 2015.

=== Abuse allegations ===
In October 2024, the father of two Romanian rhythmic gymnasts, Annaliese Dragan and Christina Dragan, accused Deleanu of verbal abusing and forcing to train on injuries his daughters as well as several other Romanian gymnasts. She denied the allegations and said that Annaliese Dragan had pre-existing medical conditions that doctors had cleared her to continue training with. Following this, both sisters were removed from the national team.

In January and February 2025, several other gymnasts came forward with allegations of abuse from Deleanu and other coaches, including Denisa Mailat and national champions Alexandra Piscupescu and Ana Luiza Filiorianu. The gymnasts alleged that they experienced repeated mental and physical abuse, there was an atmosphere of fear in training, and that they and other gymnasts were verbally abused, thrown around and beaten, and forced to repeatedly perform elements as a punishment. Irina Lalciu said that she quit gymnastics due to the abusive treatment she received.

In February 2026, Piscupescu won a judgement by the National Council for Combating Discrimination against the Romanian Rhythmic Gymnastics Federation and Deleanu for harassment. Deleanu said that she would challenge the decision. Following this, Deleanu was removed from her position on the Romanian Olympic and Sports Committee.
