= Alexandra Piscupescu =

Romanian rhythmic gymnast

- Nickname: Alexa
- Born: 10 June 1994 (age 32) Bucharest, Romania

Gymnastics career
- Discipline: Rhythmic gymnastics
- Country represented: Romania
- Club: Olimpia
- Head coach: Maria Garba
- Assistant coach: Elena Vlad
- Choreographer: Anca Iorga
- World ranking: 16 (2013 Season); 25 (2012 Season); 56 (2011 Season)

Alexandra Piscupescu (born 10 June 1994) is a retired Romanian rhythmic gymnast. She is a 6-time Romanian national champion. She now works as a judge and coach.

== Gymnastics career ==
As a junior, she competed at the 2009 Irina Deleanu Cup, where she won the junior all-around gold medal.

Piscupescu debuted as a senior in 2010. She competed at the 2010 World Championships in Moscow and did not qualify for the all-around final. The next year, she competed at the 2011 World Championships in Montpellier, France, and this time advanced to the final. She finished 17th in the all-around final.

In early 2012, she participated in the 2012 London Test Event. She placed 7th in the all-around final and 6th out of the gymnasts eligible to qualify for a place at the 2012 Summer Olympics; there were only five spots available, so Piscupescu only qualified as the first reserve gymnast. The Romanian Gymnastics Federation protested the result, claiming that her scores were too low and there were problems with the makeup of the judging panel. Picupescu wore a black armband in the finals as a protest against the judging. Later that year, Picupescu finished 18th in the all-around at the 2012 European Championships in Nizhny Novgorod, Russia.

In 2013, Piscupescu won her first World cup medals at the 2013 Irina Deleanu Cup. There she won silver with hoop and ball and bronze in the ribbon final. Unusually, her ribbon final routine was accompanied live by the singer of the song she had chosen to compete with. Piscupescu competed at the 2013 World Games in Cali where she finished 11th in Hoop, 13th in Ball and 20th in Clubs and therefore did not qualify to any apparatus finals. She again finished 17th in the 2013 World Championships All-around final behind Azeri gymnast Marina Durunda.

In 2014, Piscupescu won the 2014 Irina Deleanu Cup. On 10–15 June Piscupescu competed at the 2014 European Championships and finished 18th in the All-around. She then competed at the 2014 World Championships and placed 32nd in the all-around qualifications, which did not allow her to advance to the final. She won her 6th national title and announced her retirement from Rhythmic Gymnastics after the competition.

Piscupescu made a comeback in August 2015. She finished 22nd in the all-around at the 2015 Budapest World Cup. On 9–13 September she competed at the 2015 World Championships in Stuttgart. She was 33rd in the all-around qualifications and again did not advance into the finals.

== Coaching career ==
After her retirement, she began to work as a trainer at the Clubul Sportul Studențesc. She has coached gymnasts such as Annaliese Dragan, who earned a spot for the 2024 Summer Olympics, Lisa Garac, who won bronze in teams at the 2023 Junior World Championships, and the national junior group. She is became a member of the Technical Committee at European Gymnastics in 2023. Picupescu began working at the Romanian Rhythmic Gymnastics Federation after her retirement and became its vice-president, but she was removed as a national team coach in August 2024, and she resigned at the end of January 2025.

In January 2025, Piscupescu was one of several Romanian rhythmic gymnasts who came forward with allegations of abuse from coaches. She recalled that the coaches repeatedly used insults, especially about intelligence, against gymnasts. Afterward, she resigned her position as vice-president of the Romanian federation, saying that "I never had the intention to denigrate anyone" in the course of making her allegations, but that she felt she could no longer be a member of an organization that she felt did not reflect her values. After making her allegations, Piscupescu herself was also accused of insulting and slapping young gymnasts. The police investigated the accusations and closed the case.

In February 2026, Piscupescu won a lawsuit against the Romanian Rhythmic Gymnastics Federation for removing her as a coach of the national team and preventing her from attending an international judging course, held only once every Olympic cycle. She then won a judgement by the National Council for Combating Discrimination against both the Federation and Irina Deleanu for harassment.
