= Raya Bozhilova =

Bulgarian rhythmic gymnast (born 2010)

- Рая Божилова
- Born: 12 October 2010 (age 16) Sofia, Bulgaria

Gymnastics career
- Discipline: Rhythmic gymnastics
- Country represented: Bulgaria; (2023-)
- Club: Ilana
- Head coach: Vesela Dimitrova
- Assistant coach: Yasena Stoyneva
- Choreographer: Svetlin Dimitrov
Medal record
Rhythmic Gymnastics
Representing Bulgaria
Event	1st	2nd	3rd
FIG World Cup	0	0	2
Total	0	0	2
World Championships
Silver medal – second place	2026 Frankfurt	Team
Bronze medal – third place	2026 Frankfurt	5 Balls
Bronze medal – third place	2026 Frankfurt	3 hoops & 2 clubs
European Championships
Gold medal – first place	2026 Varna	Team
European Cup
Gold medal – first place	2025 Baku	Junior Group all-around
Gold medal – first place	2025 Baku	5 Hoops
Gold medal – first place	2025 Baku	10 Clubs
Gold medal – first place	2025 Burgas	Junior Group all-around
Gold medal – first place	2025 Burgas	5 Hoops
Gold medal – first place	2025 Burgas	10 Clubs
Gold medal – first place	2026 Baku	Cross Battle
Junior World Championships
Gold medal – first place	2025 Sofia	Team
Gold medal – first place	2025 Sofia	Group all-around
Gold medal – first place	2025 Sofia	5 Hoops
Bronze medal – third place	2025 Sofia	10 Clubs
Junior European Championships
Bronze medal – third place	2025 Tallinn	10 Clubs

Raya Bozhilova (Bulgarian: Рая Божилова, born 12 October 2010) is a Bulgarian rhythmic gymnast. She represents Bulgaria in international competitions.

== Career ==
In 2018, Bozhilova was selected to perform exhibitions at the World Championships in Sofia. In 2021 she helped Levski Iliana win bronze at the Bulgarian club championships along Magdalena Valkova and Raya Chervenkova. The following year she won silver in the national group championships along Raya Chervenkova, Magdalena Valkova, Ambra-Maria Dimitrova and Valentina Kostadinova.

In 2023,Bozhilova, Andrea Gyoreva, Karina Petrova, Emilia Obretenova, Emona Tsenova, Dara Stoyanova, Magdalena Valkova, Slaveya Donova, Victoria Evtimov, Monika Mladenova, Tatyana Volozhanina, Stiliana Nikolova and Alexandra Petrova won the national club championships as part of Iliana. In October she entered the national team of Bulgaria.

=== Junior ===
The following year she was selected for the national junior group. In 2025 she won silver overall and gold with 5 hoops at the Bosphorus Cup. Later the group won bronze in the All-Around and gold with 5 hoops at the Aphrodite Cup in Athens. At the Sofia Cup they won gold in the All-Around and with 5 hoops. Competing at the European Cup in Baku the group won all three gold medals. They repeated the same results in Burgas. In May she took part in the European Championships in Tallinn, where she helped the group win bronze with 10 clubs. In June the group competed in the 3rd Junior World Championships in Sofia, winning gold in teams along group mates Gabriela Traykova, Anania Dimitrova, Elena Hristova, Yoana Moteva and Ivayla Velkovska with individuals Anastasia Kaleva, Aleksa Rasheva and Magdalena Valkova, and in the all-around.

In October she was incorporated into the senior group for the upcoming season.

=== Senior ===
She became age eligible for senior competitions in 2026, debuting at the World Cup in Sofia, being 4th with 5 balls, 8th with 3 hoops & 4 clubs, winning bronze in the All-Around. At Baku World Cup they were 8th in the All-Around, 12th with 5 balls and took bronze with 3 hoops & 4 clubs. In May, the team competed at the 2026 European Championships in Varna, Bulgaria. They took 6th place in group all-around competition, and qualified to 5 Balls final, where they were 8th. They won gold medal in team competition alongside Eva Brezalieva and Stiliana Nikolova. She was chosen to represent Bulgaria alongside Rachel Stoyanov, Magdalina Minevska, Emilia Obretenova and Margarita Vasileva at the 2026 World Championships in Frankfurt, Germany. In group all-around competition they finished off the podium, on 6th place, due to mistakes in 5 Balls routine. They won bronze medals in both apparatus finals and silver medal in team competition alongside Eva Brezalieva and Stiliana Nikolova.
