= Ivayla Velkovska =

Bulgarian rhythmic gymnast (born 2010)

- Ивайла Велковска
- Born: 17 September 2010 (age 16) Sofia

Gymnastics career
- Discipline: Rhythmic gymnastics
- Country represented: Bulgaria; (2023-)
Medal record
Rhythmic Gymnastics
Representing Bulgaria
Junior World Championships
Gold medal – first place	2025 Sofia	Team
Gold medal – first place	2025 Sofia	All-around
Bronze medal – third place	2025 Sofia	10 Clubs
European Cup
Gold medal – first place	2025 Baku	Junior Group All-Around
Gold medal – first place	2025 Baku	5 Hoops
Gold medal – first place	2025 Baku	10 Clubs
Gold medal – first place	2025 Burgas	Junior Group All-Around
Gold medal – first place	2025 Burgas	5 Hoops
Gold medal – first place	2025 Burgas	10 Clubs
Junior European Championships
Bronze medal – third place	2025 Tallinn	10 Clubs

Ivayla Velkovska (Bulgarian: Ивайла Велковска; born 17 September 2010) is a Bulgarian rhythmic gymnast. She represents Bulgaria in international competitions.

== Biography ==
In November 2023 Velkovska was selected for the new Bulgarian junior group. In 2025 she won silver overall and gold with 5 hoops at the Bosphorus Cup. Later the group won bronze in the All-Around and gold with 5 hoops at the Aphrodite Cup in Athens. At the Sofia Cup they won gold in the All-Around and with 5 hoops. Competing at the European Cup in Baku the group won all three gold medals. They repeated the same results in Burgas. In May she took part in the European Championships in Tallinn, where she helped the group win bronze with 10 clubs. In June the group competed in the 3rd Junior World Championships in Sofia, winning gold in teams along group mates Raya Bozhilova, Anania Dimitrova, Elena Hristova, Yoana Moteva and Gabriela Traykova with individuals Anastasia Kaleva, Aleksa Rasheva and Magdalena Valkova, and in the All-Around.
