= Taisiia Sokolenko =

Israeli rhythmic gymnast

- טאיה סוקולנקו
- Born: 28 August 2010 (age 16)

Gymnastics career
- Discipline: Rhythmic gymnastics
- Country represented: Israel; (2025–present)
- Club: Maccabi Tel Aviv
- Head coach: Ayelet Zussman
- Assistant coach: Julieta Cantaluppi
- Former coach: Linoy Ashram
Medal record
Representing Israel
Rhythmic gymnastics
Event	1st	2nd	3rd
FIG World Cup	2	0	0
FIG World Challenge Cup	1	2	2
Total	3	2	2
European Championships
Silver medal – second place	2026 Varna	Team
Bronze medal – third place	2026 Varna	Group All-around
Bronze medal – third place	2026 Varna	5 Balls
Bronze medal – third place	2026 Varna	3 Hoops + 4 Clubs
European Cup
Gold medal – first place	2026 Baku	5 Balls
Silver medal – second place	2025 Baku	Junior 5 Hoops
Silver medal – second place	2025 Burgas	Junior Group All-Around
Silver medal – second place	2025 Burgas	Junior 5 Hoops
Silver medal – second place	2025 Burgas	Junior 10 Clubs
Silver medal – second place	2026 Baku	Cross Battle
Bronze medal – third place	2025 Baku	Junior Group All-Around

Taisiia Sokolenko (Hebrew: טאיה סוקולנקו; born 28 August 2010) is an Israeli group rhythmic gymnast. She represents Israel in international competitions.

== Career ==
=== Junior ===
In late 2024, it was announced that Sokolenko was called up to enter the new Israeli junior group under the guidance of Julieta Cantaluppi and Linoy Ashram.

In March 2025, the group made its international debut at the Sofia International Tournament, winning gold with 5 pairs of clubs as well as silver in the all-around and with 5 hoops. In May, competing at the European Cup in Baku, alongside Emilia Roitman, Melani Malka, Avigail Shved, Sofia Prezhyn and Keren Sobol, she won bronze in the all-around and silver with 5 hoops. Two weeks later, the group took all three silver medals at the European Cup stage in Burgas. In late December, it was announced that she was to join the senior group.

=== Senior ===
Sokolenko became age-eligible for senior competitions in 2026. She made her debut at the World Cup in Sofia, where she and her group members were 12th in the all-around, 7th with 5 balls and 16th with 3 hoops & 4 clubs. In Baku the group won gold in the All-Around and with 5 balls. On May 1-3, the group competed at European Cup in Baku, and won gold medal in 5 Balls. They lost against Bulgarian team in Cross battles and won silver medal. On May 16-17 the group competed at the World Challenge Cup in Portimão and won two bronze medals, in the All-Around competition, and in the 5 balls final, as well as silver with 3 hoops & 4 clubs. In May, at the 2026 European Championships in Varna, she won bronze overall and in the two event finals and silver in teams, alongside individuals Daniela Munits and Alona Tal Franco. Weeks later they competed in the World Challenge Cup in Cluji-Napoca, winning three gold medals. The following month, at the stage in Milan, they were 4th overall, 11th with 5 balls and 4th in the mixed apparatus event. In August she was selected for the World Championships in Frankfurt alongside Agam Gev, Arina Gvozdetskaia, Sofia Prezhyn, Avigail Shved and Keren Sobol. There they were 14th in the All-Around, 19th with 5 balls, 5th with 3 hoops & 4 clubs and 10th in teams (with Munits and Meital Maayan Sumkin).
