= Lian Suharevich =

Israeli Rhythmic Gymnast

- ליאן סוכרביץ'
- Born: 2 December 2009 (age 16)

Gymnastics career
- Discipline: Rhythmic gymnastics
- Country represented: Israel; (2025)
- Club: Holon Municipal Club
- Head coach: Ayelet Zussman
Medal record
Rhythmic gymnastics
Representing Israel
Event	1st	2nd	3rd
FIG European Cup	1	0	1
Total	1	0	1
European Championships
Silver medal – second place	2025 Tallinn	Group All-around
Bronze medal – third place	2025 Tallinn	Team
European Cup
Gold medal – first place	2025 Burgas	5 Ribbons
Bronze medal – third place	2025 Burgas	Cross Battle

Lian Suharevich (Hebrew: ליאן סוכרביץ'; born 2 December 2009) is an Israeli rhythmic gymnast. She represents Israel in international competitions.

== Career ==
In July 2019 Suharevich won gold in the All-Around, one gold and one silver medal at the Israel Southern District Championships. In August 2021 she took 8th place overall pre juniors at the Israeli Championships.

In 2025, after all the gymnasts that competed at the Paris Olympics retired, she entered the new group becoming its younger member. In May competing at the European Cup stage in Burgas along Agam Gev, Kristina Eilon Ternovski, Arina Gvozdetskaia, Varvara Salenkova and Maya Gamliel, she won gold with 5 hoops and bronze in the cross battle. Later she was selected for the European Championships in Tallinn. There she won silver in the All-Around and bronze in team.

In early 2026 it was revealed that she finished her career as part of the national group.
