= Arina Gvozdetskaia =

Israeli rythmic gymnast (born 2008)

- Born: October 1, 2008 (age 17) Russia

Gymnastics career
- Discipline: Rhythmic gymnastics
- Country represented: Israel (2025-present)
- Club: Maccabi Ashdod
- Head coach: Ayelet Zussman
- Former coaches: Ekaterina Gvozdetskaia, Mariia Uliushina
Medal record
Representing Israel
Rhythmic gymnastics
Event	1st	2nd	3rd
FIG European Cup	1	1	1
FIG World Cup	3	1	2
Total	4	2	3
European Championships
Silver medal – second place	2025 Tallinn	Group All-around
Silver medal – second place	2026 Varna	Team
Bronze medal – third place	2025 Tallinn	Team
Bronze medal – third place	2026 Varna	Group All-around
Bronze medal – third place	2026 Varna	5 Balls
European Cup
Gold medal – first place	2025 Burgas	5 Ribbons
Gold medal – first place	2026 Baku	5 Balls
Silver medal – second place	2026 Baku	Cross Battle
Bronze medal – third place	2025 Burgas	Cross Battle

Arina Gvozdetskaia (Hebrew: ארינה גבוזדצקי; born 1 October 2008) is a Russian born Israeli rhythmic gymnast. She represents Israel as a member of the group.

== Personal life ==
Her mother, Ekaterina Aleksandrovna Gvozdetskaia, was her coach in Russia and also the head coach of the Novosibirsk School of Olympic Reserve.

== Career ==
In 2018 Gvozdetskaia, then still competing with Novosibirsk Olympic Reserve School, competed at the 3rd DuGymCup in Dubai. She is Master of Sports of Russia. In February 2024 she was part of the team that won silver at Siberian Federal District Championships.

She moved from Russia to Israel in the summer of 2024.

In 2025 she was granted Israeli citizenship and was incorporated into the new national senior group, after all the gymnasts that competed at the Paris Olympics retired. At the World Cup in Baku they were 4th in the All-Around and winning silver with 5 ribbons. In May competing at the European Cup she won gold with 5 hoops and bronze in Cross Battle. In June she was selected for the European Championships in Tallinn. There she and her group won silver in the all-around and bronze in team. In July, group competed at Cluj-Napoca World Challenge Cup and won bronze medal in all-around behind Spain and Poland. They took 4th place in 5 ribbons and 6th place in balls+hoops final.

In August, she was selected to compete at the 2025 World Championships in Brazil, alongside Maya Gamliel, Agam Gev, Varvara Salenkova and Kristina Eilon Ternovski. They took 5th place in the all-around and qualified to both finals. In the exercise with 5 ribbons, they were 4th, and in the exercise with hoops and balls, they were 6th.

She was confirmed into the 2026 renovated group (Keren Sobol, Sofia Prezhyn, Avigail Shved, Taisiia Sokolenko and Agam Gev). At the World Cup in Sofia the group was 12th in the All-Around, 7th with 5 balls and 16th with 3 hoops & 4 clubs. In Baku the group won gold in the All-Around and with 5 balls. On May 1-3, the group competed at European Cup in Baku, and won gold medal in 5 Balls. They lost against Bulgarian team in Cross battles and won silver medal. On May 16-17 the group competed at the FIG World Challenge Cup in Portimão and won two bronze medals: in the all-around competition, and in the 5 balls final. In May, at the 2026 European Championships in Varna, Gvozdetskaia won two bronze medals with the Israeli Senior Group: in the group all-around and in the 5 balls final. She also won a silver medal in the team competition with the senior group and with Israeli individual gymnasts Daniela Munits and Alona Tal-Franco.
