= Franciska Hesz =

Hungarian rhythmic gymnast

- Full name: Franciska Mira Hesz
- Born: 23 January 2010 (age 16) Pécs

Gymnastics career
- Discipline: Rhythmic gymnastics
- Country represented: Hungary
- Club: Pécsi RG SE
- Head coach: Ekaterina Dologa
Medal record
Representing Hungary
Rhythmic Gymnastics
European Cup
Bronze medal – third place	2025 Burgas	Junior Team
Bronze medal – third place	2025 Baku	Junior Clubs

Franciska Mira Hesz (born 23 January 2010) is a Hungarian rhythmic gymnast. She represents Hungary in international competitions.

== Personal life ==
Her older sister Dominika was a member of the Hungarian rhythmic gymnastics national team.

== Career ==
Hesz took up the sport at age five. In 2022 Hesz became the national champion with hoop exercise, also winning bronze with clubs. In May she won silver in the All-Around and gold with ball at the Pécs Cup. In September 2023 she was included in a national program for gifted athletes. A month later she took bronze at nationals.

=== Junior ===
At the 2024 Irina Deleanu Cup she won bronze with ball. In April she won gold in the All-Around and bronze in teams at the Hungarian Championships in Törökbálint. In September she took bronze with ribbon at the Hungarian Cup. At the Balkan Championships in Budva she was 6th with hoop, 7th with ball and 8th with clubs. A month later she was 8th in the Master's Championship.

In April 2025 she was 7th with ball at the AGF Trophy. She then became national champion in the All-Around. In May she competed in the European Cup in Baku, winning bronze in the clubs final behind Antoaneta Tsankova and Viktoriia Dorofieieva. At the stage in Burgas she was 9th with clubs and won bronze in teams with Elena Vukmir. Ten days later she won silver in teams, along Vukmir and Regina Orvendi, at the 24th Irina Deleanu Cup in Brasov. She was then selected for the 2025 Junior World Championships in Sofia, being 27th with club and 9th in teams.

=== Senior ===
Hesz became age eligible for senior competitions in 2026.

== Routine music information ==
Year	Apparatus	Music Title
2026	Hoop	
2026	Ball	
2026	Clubs	
2026	Ribbon	
2025	Hoop	
2025	Ball	
2025	Clubs	Waba Duba by Yello
2025	Ribbon	
