= Alina Kolomiets =

Bulgarian rhythmic gymnast

- Алина Коломиец
- Born: October 12, 2006 (age 19) Saint Petersburg, Russia

Gymnastics career
- Discipline: Rhythmic gymnastics
- Country represented: Bulgaria (2021-present)
- Club: Levski Triaditsa
- Head coaches: Vesela Dimitrova, Yasena Stoyneva
Medal record
Representing Bulgaria
Rhythmic gymnastics
Event	1st	2nd	3rd
FIG European Cup	1	0	1
FIG World Cup	3	1	1
Total	4	1	2
World Championships
Silver medal – second place	2025 Rio de Janeiro	Team
European Cup
Gold medal – first place	2025 Baku	Cross Battle
Gold medal – first place	2025 Burgas	3 Balls & 2 Hoops
Silver medal – second place	2025 Burgas	Cross Battle
Silver medal – second place	2025 Burgas	5 Ribbons
Bronze medal – third place	2025 Baku	5 Ribbons

Alina Kolomiets (Bulgarian: Алина Коломиец; born 12 October 2006) is a Bulgarian rhythmic gymnast. She represents Bulgaria as part of the national senior group.

== Personal life ==
Kolomiets was born in Saint Petersburg, Russia and began gymnastics there when she was three. Her family moved to Burgas, Bulgaria when she was six.

== Career ==
In May 2018, Kolomiets won bronze with ball at the Bulgarian championships among the pre-juniors, and she won gold in the team championships with teammates Victoria Sahatchieva and Kristina Karcheva. In July, she was then selected for a national training camp.

=== Junior ===
In 2021 she, Viktoria Georgieva and Zhana Pencheva won the junior national club championships.

In 2022 she teamed up with Alexandra Alexandrova, Viktoria Georgieva, Mila Yanakieva and Hristina Parvanova to win the national group championships. At nationals she came in 8th place. At the state team championships, she helped her club Levski Triaditsa win silver.

=== Senior ===
In 2023 she was added to the national senior individual team as a reserve member. In December 2024, several members of the national group, Kamelia Petrova, Margarita Vasileva and Magdalina Minevska, retired. Following this, although Kolimiets had previously competed as an individual, she became a starting member of the national group. Her teammates were Sofia Ivanova (who became the new captain of the group), Rachel Stoyanov, Danaya Atanasova, Suzan Pouladian and Viktoria Georgieva. Sofia Pavlova and Ivon Boshkilova were the reserve members.

In April 2025, the new group debuted at their domestic World Cup stage in Sofia, where they were 4th in the all-around and won gold with 5 ribbons. At their next World Cup in Baku, they won gold in the all-around and bronze with 3 balls & 2 hoops. In May, they won gold medals in cross battle at both European Cups (Baku, Burgas). Next month, they competed at the 2025 European Championships in Tallinn, Estonia. Due to many mistakes in both routines, they finished on 15th place in all-around and failed to qualify to apparatus finals. In July, the group took 5th place in all-around at Cluj-Napoca World Challenge Cup and won bronze medal in 5 ribbons final. In August she was selected to compete at the 2025 World Championships in Rio de Janeiro, Brazil along Rachel Stoyanov, Sofia Ivanova, Danaya Atanasova and Emilia Obretenova. They took 6th place in the All-Around, after a drop in mixed routine, winning silver in the team event together with Eva Brezalieva and Stiliana Nikolova.
