= Suzan Pouladian =

Bulgarian rhythmic gymnast

- Сузанa Пуладиан
- Born: 26 March 2007 (age 19) Sofia

Gymnastics career
- Discipline: Rhythmic gymnastics
- Country represented: Bulgaria; (2021-present)
- Head coach: Vesela Dimitrova
- Assistant coaches: Mihaela Maevska, Yasena Stoyneva
- Choreographer: Margarita Budinova
Medal record
Representing Bulgaria
Rhythmic gymnastics
Event	1st	2nd	3rd
FIG European Cup	0	0	1
Junior European Championships	0	3	0
FIG World Cup	3	1	1
Total	3	4	2
European Cup
Gold medal – first place	2025 Baku	Cross Battle
Gold medal – first place	2025 Burgas	3 Balls & 2 Hoops
Silver medal – second place	2025 Burgas	Cross Battle
Silver medal – second place	2025 Burgas	5 Ribbons
Bronze medal – third place	2025 Baku	5 Ribbons
Junior European Championships
Silver medal – second place	2021 Varna	All-Around
Silver medal – second place	2021 Varna	5 Balls
Silver medal – second place	2021 Varna	5 Ribbons

Suzan Pouladian (Bulgarian: Сузанa Пуладиан; born 26 March 2007) is a Bulgarian rhythmic gymnast. She represents Bulgaria as part of the national senior group.

== Personal life ==
Pouladian has an older sister who also trained in gymnastics. In her free time, she enjoys painting.

== Career ==
Pouladian began gymnastics at age 3, when she joined her sister at the gym. Her gymnastics idol is Boryana Kaleyn. She has said she prefers performing in the group over performing individually.

=== Junior ===
Pouladian was selected for the 2020-2021 junior group along with her teammates Kristiana Doycheva, Kamelia Petrova, Maria Stamenova, Gergana Trendafilova and Aleksandra Vasileva. In February, they competed at the 2021 Moscow Grand Prix, winning all the silver medals. In April, they competed at the Sofia Cup International Tournament, where they won bronze in the all-around, gold in the 5 ribbons final, and silver in the 5 balls final. In May, they followed this with a bronze with 5 balls at the Irina Deleanu Cup.

In June, the team won all three silver medals at the 2021 Junior European Championships in the all-around and event finals.

=== Senior ===
Pouladian competed at the Sofia Cup International Tournament in April 2024 as an individual as part of the extended Bulgarian team, who did not receive rankings. She scored 107.350.

In December 2024, following the retirement of Kamelia Petrova, Margarita Vasileva and Magdalina Minevska from the national senior group, Pouladian became a starter member of the senior group. She joined Sofia Ivanova (who became the new captain),Rachel Stoyanov, Danaya Atanasova, Viktoria Georgieva and Alina Kolomiets, with Sofia Pavlova and Ivon Boshkilova as reserves.

In April 2025, the new group debuted at their domestic World Cup stage in Sofia, where they were 4th in the all-around after mistakes in their mixed apparatus routine but won gold in the 5 ribbons final. Later in April, they competed at the next World Cup stage in Baku, and they won the all-around. In the apparatus finals, they were fourth with 5 ribbons and won bronze with 3 balls + 2 hoops. In May, they won gold medals in cross battle at both European Cups (Baku, Burgas). Next month, they competed at the 2025 European Championships in Tallinn, Estonia. Due to many mistakes in both routines, they finished on 15th place in all-around and failed to qualify to apparatus finals. In July, the group took 5th place in all-around at Cluj-Napoca World Challenge Cup and won bronze medal in 5 ribbons final.
