= Danaya Atanasova =

Bulgarian rhythmic gymnast (born 2007)

- Даная Атанасова
- Born: 1 April 2007 (age 19) Plovdiv

Gymnastics career
- Discipline: Rhythmic gymnastics
- Country represented: Bulgaria; (2023-present)
- Club: Levski Triaditsa
- Head coaches: Vesela Dimitrova, Yasena Stoyneva
Medal record
Representing Bulgaria
Rhythmic gymnastics
Event	1st	2nd	3rd
FIG European Cup	1	0	1
FIG World Cup	2	0	1
Total	3	0	2
World Championships
Silver medal – second place	2025 Rio de Janeiro	Team
European Cup
Gold medal – first place	2025 Baku	Cross Battle
Gold medal – first place	2025 Burgas	3 Balls & 2 Hoops
Silver medal – second place	2025 Burgas	Cross Battle
Silver medal – second place	2025 Burgas	5 Ribbons
Bronze medal – third place	2025 Baku	5 Ribbons

Danaya Atanasova (Bulgarian: Даная Атанасова; born 1 April 2007) is a Bulgarian rhythmic gymnast. She represents Bulgaria as part of the national senior group.

== Personal life ==
Atanasova is the niece of former Bulgarian national team gymnast Boryana Gineva, who had been her coach for years.

== Career ==
In 2023 Atanasova won bronze in the national club championships along Mia Alexandrova, Arina Shvets, Ivon Boshkilova, Radina Stoyanova, Anania Dimitrova, Plamena Petrova, Antonia Marinova, Eleonora Ivanova and Eva Emilova. The following year she competed in the Sofia International Tournament.

In December 2024, following the retirement of Kamelia Petrova, Margarita Vasileva and Magdalina Minevska, she became a starter along Rachel Stoyanov, Sofia Ivanova (who became the new captain), Alina Kolomiets, Suzan Pouladian and Viktoria Georgieva with Sofia Pavlova and Ivon Boshkilova as reserves.

In April 2025 the new group debuted at their domestic World Cup stage in Sofia, being 4th in the All-Around and winning gold with 5 ribbons. In Baku they won gold in the All-Around and bronze with 3 balls & 2 hoops. In May, they won gold medals in cross battle at both European Cups (Baku, Burgas). Next month, they competed at the 2025 European Championships in Tallinn, Estonia. Due to many mistakes in both routines, they finished on 15th place in all-around and failed to qualify to apparatus finals. In July, the group won bronze medal in 5 Ribbons final of World Challenge Cup in Cluj-Napoca. In August she was selected to compete at the 2025 World Championships in Rio de Janeiro, Brazil along Rachel Stoyanov, Sofia Ivanova, Alina Kolomiets and Emilia Obretenova. They took 6th place in the All-Around, after a drop in mixed routine, winning silver in the team event together with Eva Brezalieva and Stiliana Nikolova.
