= Viktoria Georgieva =

Bulgarian rhythmic gymnast (born 2006)

- Виктория Георгиева
- Born: 2006 (age 19–20) Sofia

Gymnastics career
- Discipline: Rhythmic gymnastics
- Country represented: Bulgaria; (2020-present)
- Club: Levski Triaditsa
- Head coaches: Vesela Dimitrova, Yasena Stoyneva
Medal record
Representing Bulgaria
Rhythmic gymnastics
Event	1st	2nd	3rd
FIG European Cup	2	2	1
FIG World Cup	2	0	1
Total	4	2	2
European Cup
Gold medal – first place	2025 Baku	Cross Battle
Gold medal – first place	2025 Burgas	3 Balls & 2 Hoops
Silver medal – second place	2025 Burgas	Cross Battle
Silver medal – second place	2025 Burgas	5 Ribbons
Bronze medal – third place	2025 Baku	5 Ribbons

Viktoria Georgieva (Bulgarian: Виктория Георгиева; born 2006) is a Bulgarian rhythmic gymnast. She represents Bulgaria as part of the national senior group.

== Career ==
In June 2017 Georgieva won bronze in the children club championships along Adriana Angelova and Mila Yanakieva. A year later she took bronze in the pre junior category at nationals, behind Viktoria Sahatchieva and Kristina Karcheva, and also in the rope final. In July 2018 she was then selected for a national training camp.

In 2020 she, along Hristina Parvanova and Mila Yanakieva, won the national club championships among juniors. At nationals she took 4th place behind Stiliana Nikolova, Radina Tomova and Sofia Ivanova, winning bronze in the ribbon final.

At the 2021 Julieta Shishmanova tournament she was 7th in the All-Around among juniors. Then Georgieva, Alina Kolomiets and Zhana Pencheva won the junior national club championships. At the individual championships she won bronze in the All-Around . In 2022 she teamed up with Alexandra Alexandrova, Alina Kolomiets, Mila Yanakieva and Hristina Parvanova to win the national group championships.

In 2023 she was incorporated into the national senior group as a reserve. In December 2024, following the retirement of Kamelia Petrova, Margarita Vasileva and Magdalina Minevska, she became a starter along Rachel Stoyanov, Sofia Ivanova (who became the new captain), Danaya Atanasova, Suzan Pouladian and Alina Kolomiets with Sofia Pavlova and Ivon Boshkilova as reserves.

In April 2025 the new group debuted at their domestic World Cup stage in Sofia, being 4th in the All-Around and winning gold with 5 ribbons. In Baku they won gold in the All-Around and bronze with 3 balls & 2 hoops. In May, they won gold medals in cross battle at both European Cups (Baku, Burgas). Next month, they competed at the 2025 European Championships in Tallinn, Estonia. Due to many mistakes in both routines, they finished on 15th place in all-around and failed to qualify to apparatus finals.
