= Emilia Obretenova =

Bulgarian rhythmic gymnast (born 2007)

- Емилия Обретенова
- Born: 24 November 2007 (age 18) Sofia, Bulgaria

Gymnastics career
- Discipline: Rhythmic gymnastics
- Country represented: Bulgaria; (2025-present)
- Club: Iliana
- Head coaches: Vesela Dimitrova, Yasena Stoyneva
Medal record
Representing Bulgaria
Rhythmic gymnastics
Event	1st	2nd	3rd
FIG World Cup	0	0	3
Total	0	0	3
World Championships
Silver medal – second place	2025 Rio de Janeiro	Team
Silver medal – second place	2026 Frankfurt	Team
Bronze medal – third place	2026 Frankfurt	5 Balls
European Championships
Gold medal – first place	2026 Varna	Team

Emilia Obretenova (Bulgarian: Емилия Обретенова; born 24 November 2007) is a Bulgarian rhythmic gymnast. She represents Bulgaria as part of the national senior group.

== Biography ==
Obretenova took up the sport in October 2015. In 2017, competing among girls born in 2005–2006, she won silver in the All-Around, silver with rope and ball and bronze with hoop at the International Tournament Ness-Ziona.

In 2019 she took 5th place among pre-juniors at the Bulgarian Championships. In September 2020 she won gold in the All-Around in the junior category at nationals, in front of Dayana Dimitrova and Antonia Marinova, also claiming the title with clubs.

She became age eligible for senior competitions in 2023, when she won gold at the national club championships as a member of Iliana along Andrea Gyoreva, Karina Petrova, Emona Tsenova, Dara Stoyanova, Magdalena Valkova, Slaveya Donova, Victoria Evtimov, Monika Mladenova, Raya Bozhilova, Tatyana Volozhanina, Stiliana Nikolova and Alexandra Petrova. In July 2024 she was included into the selection process for the Bulgarian group for the 2025-2028 cycle.

In June 2025 (after part of the gymnasts that competed in Paris retired) she was called up to enter the national senior group, debuting at the World Cup in Cluj-Napoca where Bulgaria placed 5th overall, 8th with 3 balls & 2 hoops and won bronze with 5 ribbons. In August she was selected for the World Championships in Rio de Janeiro along Danaya Atanasova, Sofia Ivanova, Alina Kolomiets and Rachel Stoyanov. There they took 6th place in the All-Around (having had a drop in their mixed routine), winning silver in the team event along Eva Brezalieva and Stiliana Nikolova.

In 2026, Obretenova, Magdalina Minevska and Sofia Ivanova remained in the group together with newcomers Raya Bozhilova and Magdalena Valkova. On March 28-30, they competed at Sofia World Cup, and won bronze medal in all-around. In Baku they were 8th in the All-Around, 12th with 5 balls and took bronze with 3 hoops & 4 clubs. In May, the team competed at the 2026 European Championships in Varna, Bulgaria. They took 6th place in group all-around competition, and qualified to 5 Balls final, where they were 8th. They won gold medal in team competition alongside Eva Brezalieva and Stiliana Nikolova. In August, she was chosen to represent Bulgaria alongside Raya Bozhilova, Magdalina Minevska, Margarita Vasileva and Rachel Stoyanov at the 2026 World Championships in Frankfurt, Germany. In group all-around competition they finished off the podium, on 6th place, due to mistakes in 5 Balls routine. They won bronze medals in both apparatus finals and silver medal in team competition alongside Eva Brezalieva and Stiliana Nikolova.
