= Alice Rozenberg =

Israeli rhythmic gymnast (born 2011)

- אליס רוזנברג
- Nickname: Alisa
- Born: 12 March 2011 (age 15)

Gymnastics career
- Discipline: Rhythmic gymnastics
- Country represented: Israel; (2025-present)
- Club: Maccabi Haifa
- Head coach: Ayelet Zussman
- Assistant coach: Anna Viner
Medal record
Representing Israel
Rhythmic gymnastics
Junior European Championships
Bronze medal – third place	2026 Varna	Team
European Cup
Gold medal – first place	2025 Baku	Junior Ball
Gold medal – first place	2025 Burgas	Junior Ball
Silver medal – second place	2025 Burgas	Junior Team
Bronze medal – third place	2025 Baku	Junior Team
Bronze medal – third place	2025 Burgas	Junior Ribbon
Bronze medal – third place	2026 Baku	Junior Ribbon
Bronze medal – third place	2026 Baku	Junior Cross Battle

Alice Rozenberg (Hebrew: אליס רוזנברג; born 12 March 2011) is an Israeli rhythmic gymnast. She represents Israel in international competitions. On national level, she is the 2025 Israeli junior all-around champion.

== Career ==
=== Junior ===
Rozenberg made her international debut at the Sofia Cup in 2025, being 13th with ball, 4th with ribbon and winning silver in teams. In May, competing at the European Cup in Baku, she won bronze in teams (along Sofiya Gandlin and Rebekka Miller) and gold with ball. Two weeks later she took bronze with ribbon, silver in teams (along Sofiya Gandlin) and gold with ball at the European Cup stage in Burgas. In June, she was supposed to take part in the Junior World Championships in Sofia, but Israel's participation was cancelled due to the post-October 7 crisis. In July she was crowned national junior champion in the All-Around. In October she took part in the AEON Cup in Tokyo along Lian Rona and Alona Tal Franco, being 4th in teams.

In 2026 she competed in the European Cup in Baku, winning bronze with ribbon and in the team cross battle. In May, she was selected to represent Israel at the 2026 European Championships in Varna, Bulgaria, and won bronze medal in team competition alongside Mariia Miachina and Rebekka Miller.

== Routine music information ==
Year	Apparatus	Music title
2026	Hoop	
2026	Ball	Save Me (Swanlake) by LaCross
2026	Clubs	
2026	Ribbon	
