= 2025 Rhythmic Gymnastics European Cup =

Rhythmic gymnastics competition

- Venue: National Gymnastics Arena, Arena Burgas
- Location: Baku, Azerbaijan Burgas, Bulgaria
- Date: 1-4 May 2025, 15-18 May 2025

The 2025 Rhythmic Gymnastics European Cup is the second European Cup in Rhythmic Gymnastics. The competition was held at the National Gymnastics Arena in Baku, Azerbaijan from 1 to 4 May, 2025 and at the Arena Burgas in Burgas, Bulgaria from 15 to 18 May 2025.

== Participating countries ==
Sources:

- Armenia
- Azerbaijan
- Bosnia and Herzegovina
- Bulgaria
- Democratic Republic of the Congo
- Costa Rica
- Croatia
- Cyprus
- Czech Republic
- Egypt
- Estonia
- France
- Georgia
- Hungary
- India
- Israel
- Italy
- South Korea
- Latvia
- Lithuania
- Luxembourg
- Moldova
- North Macedonia
- Montenegro
- Poland
- Romania
- Serbia
- Ukraine

== Competition schedule ==
=== Baku ===
- Thursday May 1
  - 13:00 – 15:00 Senior Individual Qualification & Apparatus ranking, Hoop and Ball – Group B
  - 15:00 – 15:30 Lunch break
  - 15:30 – 16:00 Opening ceremony
  - 16:00 – 18:00 Senior Individual Qualification & Apparatus ranking, Hoop and Ball – Group A
  - 18:00 – 18:15 Award ceremonies, Senior Individual Hoop and Ball apparatus ranking
- Friday May 2
  - 10:00 – 12:00 Senior Individual Qualification & Apparatus ranking, Clubs and Ribbon – Group A
  - 12:15 – 14:15 Senior Individual Qualification & Apparatus ranking, Clubs and Ribbon – Group B
  - 14:15 – 14:30 Award ceremonies, Senior Individual Clubs and Ribbon apparatus ranking
  - 14:30 – 15:30 Lunch break
  - 15:30 – 17:00 Senior Groups Qualification & Apparatus ranking,5 ribbons & 3 balls + 2 hoops
  - 17:00 – 17:15 Award ceremonies Senior Groups 5 Ribbons & 3 Balls + 2 Hoops
- Saturday May 3
  - 10:00 – 11:30 Junior Groups Qualification & All-around ranking (5 Hoops, 5 Clubs)
  - 11:30 – 11:45 Award ceremonies Junior Groups All-around ranking
  - 11:45 - 12:00 Break
  - 12:00 - 14:00 Juniors Individual Qualification & Team ranking – Set A (Hoop, Ball, Clubs, Ribbon)
  - 14:00 - 14:30 Juniors Individual Qualification & Team ranking – Set B (Hoop, Ball, Clubs, Ribbon)
  - 16:30 - 16:45 Award ceremonies Junior Individual Team ranking
  - 17:15 - 18:15 Senior Group Cross Battles
  - 18:15 - 18:30 Award ceremonies Senior Group Cross Battles
- Sunday May 4
  - 10:00 - 12:30 Juniors Individual Apparatus Finals (Hoop, Ball, Clubs, Ribbon)
  - 12:30 - 12:45 Award ceremonies Junior Individuals Apparatus Finals
  - 12:45 - 14:05 Juniors Group Apparatus Finals (5 Hoops, 5 Clubs)
  - 14:10 - 14:25 Award ceremonies Juniors Group Apparatus Finals
  - 14:25 - 15:00 Lunch break
  - 15:30 - 16:30 Senior Individual Cross Battles 1/8-Final with top 16
  - 16:30 - 17:00 Break
  - 17:00 - 19:00 Senior Individual Cross Battles ¼-Final, Semi-Final and Final
  - 19:00 - 19:15 Award ceremonies Senior Individual Apparatus Finals

=== Burgas ===
- Thursday May 15
  - 15:00 – 16:00 Senior Individual Qualification & Apparatus ranking, Hoop and Ball – Group B
  - 16:30 - 17:30 Senior Individual Qualification & Apparatus ranking, Hoop and Ball – Group A
  - 18:00 - 19:00 Opening Ceremony
- Friday May 16
  - 11:00 – 12:00 Senior Individual Qualification & Apparatus ranking, Clubs and Ribbon – Group A
  - 12:30 – 13:45 Senior Individual Qualification & Apparatus ranking, Clubs and Ribbon – Group B
  - 15:00 – 16:15 Senior Groups Qualification & Apparatus ranking,5 ribbons & 3 balls + 2 hoops
- Saturday May 17
  - 10:00 - 12:30 Juniors Individual Qualification & Team ranking (Hoop, Ball, Clubs, Ribbon)
  - 13:30 - 15:00 Junior Groups Qualification & All-around ranking (5 Hoops, 5 Clubs)
  - 15:45 - 17:00 Senior Group Cross Battles
- Sunday May 18
  - 10:00 - 12:30 Juniors Individual Apparatus Finals (Hoop, Ball, Clubs, Ribbon)
  - 12:45 - 14:15 Juniors Group Apparatus Finals (5 Hoops, 5 Clubs)
  - 15:30 - 17:15 Senior Individual Cross Battles 1/8-Final with top 16
  - 17:30 - 18:30 Senior Individual Cross Battles ¼-Final, Semi-Final and Final

== Medal winners ==
=== Baku ===
Event	Gold	Silver	Bronze
Senior Group Finals
Cross Battle	Bulgaria; Danaya Atanasova; Viktoria Georgieva; Alina Kolomiets; Sofia Ivanova; Suzan Pouladian; Rachel Stoyanov	Italy; Chiara Badii; Laura Golfarelli; Alexandra Naclerio; Serena Ottaviani; Giulia Segatori; Sofia Sicignano	Azerbaijan; Kamilla Aliyeva; Laman Alimuradova; Yelyzaveta Luzan; Sofiya Mammadova; Darya Sorokina
5 Ribbons	Italy; Chiara Badii; Laura Golfarelli; Alexandra Naclerio; Serena Ottaviani; Giulia Segatori; Sofia Sicignano	Estonia; Kamila Grigorenko; Elys Kretelle Kukk; Nika Oborskaja; Ksenja Ozigina; Polina Tubaleva; Johanna Simone Pertens	Bulgaria; Danaya Atanasova; Viktoria Georgieva; Alina Kolomiets; Sofia Ivanova; Suzan Pouladian; Rachel Stoyanov
3 Balls + 2 Hoops	Azerbaijan; Kamilla Aliyeva; Laman Alimuradova; Yelyzaveta Luzan; Sofiya Mammadova; Darya Sorokina	Ukraine; Yelyzaveta Azza; Anastasiia Ikan; Valeriia Peremeta; Kira Shyrykina; Nadiia Yurina; Oleksandra Yushchak	Italy; Chiara Badii; Laura Golfarelli; Alexandra Naclerio; Serena Ottaviani; Giulia Segatori; Sofia Sicignano
Senior Individual Finals
Cross Battle	(Italy) Sofia Raffaeli	(Uzbekistan) Lola Djuraeva	(Ukraine) Taisiia Onofriichuk
Hoop	(Ukraine) Taisiia Onofriichuk	(Israel) Lian Rona	(Italy) Tara Dragas
Ball	(Italy) Sofia Raffaeli	(Uzbekistan) Lola Djuraeva	(Ukraine) Taisiia Onofriichuk
Clubs	(Ukraine) Taisiia Onofriichuk	(Italy) Tara Dragas	(Bulgaria) Dara Malinova
Ribbon	(Ukraine) Taisiia Onofriichuk	(Italy) Tara Dragas	(Romania) Amalia Lica
Junior Individual Finals
Team	Bulgaria; Aleksa Rasheva; Magdalena Valkova; Antoaneta Tsankova	Italy; Ginevra Bindi; Carol Michelotti	Israel; Sofiya Gandlin; Rebekka Miller; Alice Rozenberg
Hoop	(Israel) Rebekka Miller	(Bulgaria) Magdalena Valkova	(Hungary) Elena Vukmir
Ball	(Israel) Alice Rozenberg	(Poland) Kseniya Zhyzhych	(Estonia) Sofia Jakovleva
Clubs	(Bulgaria) Antoaneta Tsankova	(Ukraine) Viktoriia Dorofieieva	(Hungary) Franciska Hesz
Ribbon	(Ukraine) Liubov Gorashchenko	(Poland) Kseniya Zhyzhych	(Azerbaijan) Shams Aghahuseynova
Junior Group Finals
All-Around	Bulgaria; Anania Dimitrova; Ivayla Velkovska; Raya Bozhilova; Gabriela Traykova; Yoana Moteva; Elena Hristova	Ukraine; Ahata Bilenko; Anastasiia Nikolenko; Oleksandra Nikol Samoukina; Kateryna Shershen; Marharyta Melnyk; Taisiia Redka	Israel; Emilia Roitman; Melani Malka; Avigail Shved; Sofia Prezhyn; Taisiia Sokolenko; Keren Sobol
5 Hoops	Bulgaria; Anania Dimitrova; Ivayla Velkovska; Raya Bozhilova; Gabriela Traykova; Yoana Moteva; Elena Hristova	Israel; Emilia Roitman; Melani Malka; Avigail Shved; Sofia Prezhyn; Taisiia Sokolenko; Keren Sobol	Azerbaijan; Nazrin Abdullayeva; Nazrin Salmanli; Ayan Nasirova; Roya Alikishiyeva; Shams Muvaffagi
10 Clubs	Bulgaria; Anania Dimitrova; Ivayla Velkovska; Raya Bozhilova; Gabriela Traykova; Yoana Moteva; Elena Hristova	Italy; Elisa Maria Comignani; Chiara Cortese; Flavia Cassano; Ginevra Pascarella; Elisabetta Valdifiori; Virginia Galeazzi	Azerbaijan; Nazrin Abdullayeva; Nazrin Salmanli; Ayan Nasirova; Roya Alikishiyeva; Shams Muvaffagi

=== Burgas ===
Event	Gold	Silver	Bronze
Senior Group Finals
Cross battle	Hungary; Mandula Virag Meszaros; Monika Urban-Szabo; Fruzsina Grek; Dora Szabados; Dalma Pesti; Julia Farkas	Bulgaria; Danaya Atanasova; Viktoria Georgieva; Alina Kolomiets; Sofia Ivanova; Suzan Pouladian; Rachel Stoyanov	Israel; Kristina Eilon Ternovski; Maya Gamliel; Agam Gev; Arina Gvozdetskaia; Varvara Salenkova; Lian Suharevich
5 Ribbons	Israel; Kristina Eilon Ternovski; Maya Gamliel; Agam Gev; Arina Gvozdetskaia; Varvara Salenkova; Lian Suharevich	Bulgaria; Danaya Atanasova; Viktoria Georgieva; Alina Kolomiets; Sofia Ivanova; Suzan Pouladian; Rachel Stoyanov	Hungary; Mandula Virag Meszaros; Monika Urban-Szabo; Fruzsina Grek; Dora Szabados; Dalma Pesti; Julia Farkas
3 Balls + 2 Hoops	Bulgaria; Danaya Atanasova; Viktoria Georgieva; Alina Kolomiets; Sofia Ivanova; Suzan Pouladian; Rachel Stoyanov	Azerbaijan; Kamilla Aliyeva; Laman Alimuradova; Yelyzaveta Luzan; Sofiya Mammadova; Darya Sorokina; Gullu Aghalarzade	Hungary; Mandula Virag Meszaros; Monika Urban-Szabo; Fruzsina Grek; Dora Szabados; Dalma Pesti; Julia Farkas
Senior Individual Finals
Cross Battle	(Israel) Meital Maayam Sumkin	(Bulgaria) Stiliana Nikolova	(Bulgaria) Dara Stoyanova
Hoop	(Israel) Meital Maayam Sumkin	(Bulgaria) Dara Stoyanova	(Romania) Amalia Lica
Ball	(Bulgaria) Stiliana Nikolova	(Cyprus) Vera Tugolukova	(Israel) Alona Tal Franco
Clubs	(Bulgaria) Stiliana Nikolova	(Romania) Amalia Lica	(Israel) Meital Maayam Sumkin
Ribbon	(Bulgaria) Stiliana Nikolova	(Israel) Meital Maayam Sumkin	(Cyprus) Vera Tugolukova
Junior Individual Finals
Team	Bulgaria; Anastasia Kaleva; Magdalena Valkova; Antoaneta Tsankova	Israel; Sofiya Gandlin; Alice Rozenberg	Hungary; Franciska Hesz; Elena Vukmir
Hoop	(Israel) Sofiya Gandlin	(Serbia) Maša Nikolić	(Romania) Patricia Stanciu
Ball	(Israel) Alice Rozenberg	(Georgia (country)) Nita Jamagidze	(Romania) Patricia Stanciu
Clubs	(Bulgaria) Anastasia Kaleva	(Azerbaijan) Fidan Gurbanli	(Romania) Patricia Stanciu
Ribbon	(Bulgaria) Magdalena Valkova	(Azerbaijan) Shams Aghahuseynova	(Israel) Alice Rozenberg
Junior Group Finals
All-Around	Bulgaria; Anania Dimitrova; Ivayla Velkovska; Raya Bozhilova; Gabriela Traykova; Yoana Moteva; Elena Hristova	Israel; Emilia Roitman; Melani Malka; Avigail Shved; Sofia Prezhyn; Taisiia Sokolenko; Keren Sobol	Azerbaijan; Nazrin Abdullayeva; Nazrin Salmanli; Ayan Nasirova; Roya Alikishiyeva; Shams Muvaffagi
5 Hoops	Bulgaria; Anania Dimitrova; Ivayla Velkovska; Raya Bozhilova; Gabriela Traykova; Yoana Moteva; Elena Hristova	Israel; Emilia Roitman; Melani Malka; Avigail Shved; Sofia Prezhyn; Taisiia Sokolenko; Keren Sobol	Azerbaijan; Nazrin Abdullayeva; Nazrin Salmanli; Ayan Nasirova; Roya Alikishiyeva; Shams Muvaffagi
10 Clubs	Bulgaria; Anania Dimitrova; Ivayla Velkovska; Raya Bozhilova; Gabriela Traykova; Yoana Moteva; Elena Hristova	Israel; Emilia Roitman; Melani Malka; Avigail Shved; Sofia Prezhyn; Taisiia Sokolenko; Keren Sobol	Czech Republic; Johana Babištová; Anna Dalecká; Tereza Kopecka; Alexandra Maresova; Adela Mikeskova; Nathalie Oulehlova

== Results ==
=== Baku ===
==== Group All-Around ====
Rank	Nation	5	3, 2	Total
1st place, gold medalist(s)	Italy	24.900	24.000	48.900
2nd place, silver medalist(s)	Estonia	22.000	23.400	45.400
3rd place, bronze medalist(s)	Ukraine	20.850	24.350	45.200
4	Bulgaria	21.950	23.100	45.050
5	Azerbaijan	19.750	24.700	45.050
6	Georgia	16.800	19.450	36.250

==== 5 Ribbons ====
Rank	Nation	D Score	A Score	E Score	Pen	Total
1st place, gold medalist(s)	Italy	11.000	6.950	6.050		24.900
2nd place, silver medalist(s)	Estonia	9.800	6.600	5.600		22.000
3rd place, bronze medalist(s)	Bulgaria	11.100	6.650	5.100		21.950
4	Ukraine	10.300	5.950	4.600		20.850
5	Azerbaijan	8.800	5.950	5.000		19.750
6	Georgia	7.300	5.500	4.300	0.300	16.800

==== 3 Balls & 2 Hoops ====
Rank	Nation	D Score	A Score	E Score	Pen	Total
1st place, gold medalist(s)	Azerbaijan	11.900	6.700	6.100		24.700
2nd place, silver medalist(s)	Ukraine	11.200	7.200	5.950		24.350
3rd place, bronze medalist(s)	Italy	10.500	7.150	6.350		24.000
4	Estonia	11.100	6.650	5.650		23.400
5	Bulgaria	11.700	6.850	5.150	0.300	23.100
6	Georgia	8.700	6.000	5.050	0.300	19.450

=== Individuals ===
(one gymnast per country)

==== Hoop ====
Rank	Gymnast	Nation	D Score	A Score	E Score	Pen	Total
1st place, gold medalist(s)	Taisiia Onofriichuk	Ukraine	13.300	8.100	8.150		29.550
2nd place, silver medalist(s)	Lian Rona	Israel	12.300	8.100	8.000		28.400
3rd place, bronze medalist(s)	Tara Dragas	Italy	11.600	7.950	8.050		27.600
4	Amalia Lica	Romania	12.100	7.850	7.500		27.450
5	Oleksandra Shalueva	Bulgaria	11.800	7.650	7.900		27.350
6	Fanni Pigniczki	Hungary	11.900	7.500	7.500		26.900
7	Kamilla Seyidzade	Azerbaijan	11.000	7.600	7.650		26.250
8	Valeria Valesevits	Estonia	11.500	7.150	7.550		26.200

==== Ball ====
Rank	Gymnast	Nation	D Score	A Score	E Score	Pen	Total
1st place, gold medalist(s)	Sofia Raffaeli	Italy	11.900	7.950	8.050		27.900
2nd place, silver medalist(s)	Lola Djuraeva	Uzbekistan	12.000	7.600	7.950		27.550
3rd place, bronze medalist(s)	Taisiia Onofriichuk	Ukraine	11.900	7.950	7.600		27.450
4	Fanni Pigniczki	Hungary	11.000	7.500	7.750		26.250
5	Dara Malinova	Bulgaria	10.800	7.650	7.650		26.100
6	Andreea Verdes	Romania	10.700	7.500	7.900		26.100
7	Lian Rona	Israel	10.200	7.700	8.000		25.900
8	Govhar Ibrahimova	Azerbaijan	10.100	7.550	7.550		25.200

==== Clubs ====
Rank	Gymnast	Nation	D Score	A Score	E Score	Pen	Total
1st place, gold medalist(s)	Taisiia Onofriichuk	Ukraine	12.500	8.000	7.800		28.300
2nd place, silver medalist(s)	Tara Dragas	Italy	12.400	7.900	7.750	0.050	28.000
3rd place, bronze medalist(s)	Dara Malinova	Bulgaria	12.100	7.800	7.650	0.100	27.450
4	Mishel Nesterova	Uzbekistan	12.000	7.350	7.400		26.750
5	Hanna Panna Wiesner	Hungary	11.400	7.600	7.550		26.550
6	Daniela Munits	Israel	10.900	7.750	7.550		26.200
7	Amalia Lica	Romania	10.800	7.750	7.400	0.100	25.850
8	Tamara Artic	Croatia	11.000	7.500	7.300	0.050	25.750

==== Ribbon ====
Rank	Gymnast	Nation	D Score	A Score	E Score	Pen	Total
1st place, gold medalist(s)	Taisiia Onofriichuk	Ukraine	12.500	8.200	7.750		28.450
2nd place, silver medalist(s)	Tara Dragas	Italy	12.200	7.700	7.350	0.050	27.200
3rd place, bronze medalist(s)	Amalia Lica	Romania	11.900	7.700	7.350	0.100	26.850
4	Fanni Pigniczki	Hungary	11.700	7.450	7.200		26.350
5	Valeria Valasevits	Estonia	11.600	7.200	7.400	0.050	26.150
6	Oleksandra Shalueva	Bulgaria	10.700	7.750	7.400	0.150	25.700
7	Lola Djuraeva	Uzbekistan	10.400	7.850	7.600		25.400
8	Kamila Seyidzade	Azerbaijan	10.400	7.550	7.450		25.400

==== Cross battles last 16 round with hoop ====
Gymnast 1	Score	Gymnast 2	Score
Kamilla Seyidzade	23.000	Taisiia Onofriichuk	29.150
Dara Malinova	28.050	Daniela Munits	28.200
Valeria Valasevits	26.200	Sofia Raffaeli	29.200
Fanni Pigniczki	26.500	Oleksandra Shalueva	27.300

==== Cross battles last 16 round with ball ====
Gymnast 1	Score	Gymnast 2	Score
Lian Rona	28.250	Tara Dragas	26.900
Amalia Lica	25.900	Andreea Verdes	26.450
Lola Djuraeva	26.800	Mishel Nesterova	24.250
Polina Karika	27.550	Hanna Panna Wiesner	25.150

==== Cross battles last 8 round with ball ====
Gymnast 1	Score	Gymnast 2	Score
Oleksandra Shalueva	23.100	Sofia Raffaeli	28.100
Taisiia Onofriichuk	28.200	Daniela Munits	26.050

==== Cross battles last 8 round with hoop ====
Gymnast 1	Score	Gymnast 2	Score
Andreea Verdes	26.650	Polina Karika	27.350
Lian Rona	27.600	Lola Djuraeva	28.950

==== Cross battles last 4 round with clubs ====
Gymnast 1	Score	Gymnast 2	Score
Taisiia Onofriichuk	27.050	Sofia Raffaeli	27.300
Lola Djuraeva	29.250	Polina Karika	27.650

==== Cross battle bronze medal round with ribbon ====
Gymnast 1	Score	Gymnast 2	Score
Taisiia Onofriichuk	26.250	Polina Karika	21.800

==== Cross battle gold medal round with ribbon ====
Gymnast 1	Score	Gymnast 2	Score
Sofia Raffaeli	28.700	Lola Djuraeva	27.250

==== Juniors ====
===== Teams =====
Rank	Nation	Total
1st place, gold medalist(s)	Bulgaria	97.750
2nd place, silver medalist(s)	Italy	97.250
3rd place, bronze medalist(s)	Israel	96.800
4	Ukraine	95.850
5	Hungary	95.300
6	Azerbaijan	94.200
7	Poland	94.100
8	Estonia	93.200
9	Georgia	92.250
10	Romania	92.250
11	Cyprus	90.300
12	Serbia	87.350
13	Luxembourg	87.050
14	Czech Republic	85.400
15	Montenegro	82.400
16	India	62.850
17	Bosnia and Herzegovina	56.750

==== Hoop ====
Rank	Gymnast	Nation	D Score	A Score	E Score	Pen	Total
1st place, gold medalist(s)	Rebekka Miller	Israel	10.300	8.150	7.650		26.100
2nd place, silver medalist(s)	Magdalena Valkova	Bulgaria	10.300	7.950	7.350		25.600
3rd place, bronze medalist(s)	Elena Vukmir	Hungary	10.500	7.550	7.450		25.500
4	Carol Michelotti	Italy	9.400	7.500	7.600		24.500
5	Sofiia Krainska	Ukraine	9.400	7.600	7.400		24.400
6	Lina Heleika	Egypt	8.000	7.800	7.300		23.100
7	Azada Atakishiyeva	Azerbaijan	8.500	7.550	6.900		22.950
8	Andela Vukovic	Montenegro	6.700	7.650	7.100	0.050	21.400

==== Ball ====
Rank	Gymnast	Nation	D Score	A Score	E Score	Pen	Total
1st place, gold medalist(s)	Alice Rozenberg	Israel	9.700	7.850	7.500	0.050	25.000
2nd place, silver medalist(s)	Kseniya Zhyzhych	Poland	9.000	7.550	7.450		24.000
3rd place, bronze medalist(s)	Sofia Jakovleva	Estonia	9.100	7.550	7.300		23.950
4	Ginevra Bindi	Italy	9.000	7.450	7.450		23.900
5	Aleksa Rasheva	Bulgaria	8.900	7.600	7.400		23.900
6	Regina Orvendi	Hungary	8.500	7.400	6.950		22.850
7	Shams Aghahuseynova	Azerbaijan	8.100	7.550	6.650		22.300
8	Anna Vykhodets	Ukraine	7.500	7.500	6.650		21.650

==== Clubs ====
Rank	Gymnast	Nation	D Score	A Score	E Score	Pen	Total
1st place, gold medalist(s)	Antoaneta Tsankova	Bulgaria	10.300	7.800	7.750		25.850
2nd place, silver medalist(s)	Viktoriia Dorofieieva	Ukraine	10.100	7.650	7.800		25.550
3rd place, bronze medalist(s)	Franciska Hesz	Hungary	9.500	7.450	7.550		24.500
4	Carol Michelotti	Italy	9.100	7.600	7.600		24.300
5	Kseniya Zhyzhych	Poland	8.800	7.600	7.600		24.000
6	Milla Shavladze	Georgia	8.900	7.700	7.250		23.850
7	Sofiya Gandlin	Israel	8.900	7.750	7.050		23.700
8	Lina Heleika	Egypt	8.200	7.650	7.100		22.950

==== Ribbon ====
Rank	Gymnast	Nation	D Score	A Score	E Score	Pen	Total
1st place, gold medalist(s)	Liubov Gorashchenko	Ukraine	10.100	7.750	7.650		25.500
2nd place, silver medalist(s)	Kseniya Zhyzhych	Poland	9.500	7.550	7.550		24.600
3rd place, bronze medalist(s)	Shams Aghahuseynova	Azerbaijan	9.100	7.900	7.400		24.400
4	Alice Rozenberg	Israel	9.000	7.900	7.450		24.350
5	Elena Vukmir	Hungary	9.600	7.400	7.350		24.350
6	Lina Heleika	Egypt	8.200	7.550	7.000		22.750
7	Ginevra Bindi	Italy	8.300	7.450	7.300	0.600	22.450
8	Rebecca Ulvoczki	Romania	7.400	6.600	6.650		20.650

==== Group All-Around ====
Rank	Nation	5	5	Total
1st place, gold medalist(s)	Bulgaria	25.800	25.350	51.150
2nd place, silver medalist(s)	Ukraine	24.200	23.650	47.850
3rd place, bronze medalist(s)	Israel	23.900	22.600	46.500
4	Italy	21.150	25.100	46.250
5	Hungary	22.550	21.500	44.050
6	Poland	22.500	21.250	43.750
7	Azerbaijan	21.100	20.300	41.400
8	Georgia	20.550	20.100	40.650
9	Estonia	18.750	19.550	38.300

==== 5 Hoops ====
Rank	Nation	D Score	A Score	E Score	Pen	Total
1st place, gold medalist(s)	Bulgaria	11.500	8.200	7.400		27.100
2nd place, silver medalist(s)	Israel	10.200	7.750	6.700		24.650
3rd place, bronze medalist(s)	Azerbaijan	9.600	7.400	6.500		23.500
4	Italy	9.600	7.450	6.300		23.350
5	Poland	9.400	7.000	6.700		23.100
6	Hungary	9.400	7.100	5.850	0.300	22.050
7	Georgia	8.600	7.150	6.200		21.950
8	Ukraine	9.100	7.300	6.000	0.600	21.800

==== 10 Clubs ====
Rank	Nation	D Score	A Score	E Score	Pen	Total
1st place, gold medalist(s)	Bulgaria	9.700	8.050	7.200		24.950
2nd place, silver medalist(s)	Italy	9.500	7.500	6.550		23.550
3rd place, bronze medalist(s)	Azerbaijan	9.400	7.250	6.850		23.500
4	Israel	9.300	7.250	6.700		23.250
5	Ukraine	8.900	7.600	6.650		23.150
6	Poland	8.000	6.900	6.700		21.600
7	Georgia	8.200	7.000	6.500	0.300	21.400
8	Hungary	8.300	6.950	5.650	0.600	20.300

=== Burgas ===
==== Group All-Around ====
Rank	Nation	5	3, 2	Total
1st place, gold medalist(s)	Bulgaria	25.850	25.800	51.650
2nd place, silver medalist(s)	Israel	26.150	23.100	49.250
3rd place, bronze medalist(s)	Hungary	22.050	24.850	46.900
4	Azerbaijan	20.850	25.150	46.000
5	Georgia	16.800	15.750	32.550
6	Serbia	14.000	16.600	30.600

==== 5 Ribbons ====
Rank	Nation	D Score	A Score	E Score	Pen	Total
1st place, gold medalist(s)						
2nd place, silver medalist(s)						
3rd place, bronze medalist(s)						

==== 3 Balls & 2 Hoops ====
Rank	Nation	D Score	A Score	E Score	Pen	Total
1st place, gold medalist(s)						
2nd place, silver medalist(s)						
3rd place, bronze medalist(s)						

=== Individuals ===
(one gymnast per country)

==== Hoop ====
Rank	Gymnast	Nation	D Score	A Score	E Score	Pen	Total
1st place, gold medalist(s)	Meital Maayam Sumkin	Israel	13.000	7.566	7.933		28.499
2nd place, silver medalist(s)	Dara Stoyanova	Bulgaria	12.600	7.600	7.666		27.866
3rd place, bronze medalist(s)	Amalia Lica	Romania	12.500	7.366	7.733		27.599
4	Lily Ramonatxo	France	12.200	7.400	7.566	0.150	27.016
5	Vera Tugolukova	Cyprus	12.000	6.933	7.733		26.666
6	Zahra Jafarova	Azerbaijan	10.600	7.466	7.233		25.299
7	Karolina Havlikova	Czech Republic	9.900	7.333	7.200		24.433
8	Nino Kvantaliani	Georgia	9.800	7.000	6.966	0.300	23.466

==== Ball ====
Rank	Gymnast	Nation	D Score	A Score	E Score	Pen	Total
1st place, gold medalist(s)	Stiliana Nikolova	Bulgaria	12.900	7.933	8.233		29.066
2nd place, silver medalist(s)	Vera Tugolukova	Cyprus	11.900	7.900	8.000		27.800
3rd place, bronze medalist(s)	Alona Tal Franco	Israel	11.600	7.733	7.733		27.066
4	Amalia Lica	Romania	11.700	7.333	7.533		26.566
5	Govhar Ibrahimova	Azerbaijan	10.800	7.466	7.366		25.632
6	Mariami Kajaia	Georgia	9.000	6.900	6.966		22.866
7	Tatev Khachatryan	Armenia	8.300	6.266	6.633		21.199
8	Karolina Havlikova	Czech Republic	8.800	5.633	6.700		21.133

==== Clubs ====
Rank	Gymnast	Nation	D Score	E Score	A Score	Pen	Total
1st place, gold medalist(s)	Stiliana Nikolova	Bulgaria	12.900	8.033	8.200	0.050	29.083
2nd place, silver medalist(s)	Amalia Lica	Romania	12.500	7.766	7.666	0.050	27.882
3rd place, bronze medalist(s)	Meital Maayam Sumkin	Israel	12.500	7.200	8.066		27.766
4	Vera Tugolukova	Cyprus	11.400	7.866	7.933		27.199
5	Govhar Ibrahimova	Azerbaijan	11.900	7.566	7.433	0.100	26.799
6	Tereza Stankova	Czech Republic	11.000	7.233	7.300		25.533
7	Lily Ramonatxo	France	10.700	6.800	7.400	0.100	24.800
8	Nikolina Lekovic	Serbia	10.200	7.333	7.100		24.633

==== Ribbon ====
Rank	Gymnast	Nation	D Score	E Score	A Score	Pen	Total
1st place, gold medalist(s)	Stiliana Nikolova	Bulgaria	13.700	7.966	8.233		29.899
2nd place, silver medalist(s)	Meital Maayan Sumkin	Israel	13.500	7.800	8.066		29.366
3rd place, bronze medalist(s)	Vera Tugolukova	Cyprus	10.700	7.733	7.866		26.299
4	Amalia Lica	Romania	10.900	7.333	7.566	0.100	25.699
5	Govhar Ibrahimova	Azerbaijan	10.100	7.266	7.366		24.732
6	Lily Ramonatxo	France	10.200	7.033	7.300	0.050	24.483
7	Mariami Kajaia	Georgia	10.000	7.333	7.065		24.399
8	Nikolina Lekovic	Serbia	9.800	7.166	7.233	0.000	24.199

==== Cross battles last 16 round with ====
Gymnast 1	Score	Gymnast 2	Score
Stiliana Nikolova	30.533	Bianca Rautu	24.166
Govhar Ibrahimova	25.133	Maria Avgousti	27.300
Amalia Lica	28.666	Tereza Stankova	22.233
Alona Tal Franco	24.499	Karolina Havlikova	24.866

==== Cross battles last 16 round with ====
Gymnast 1	Score	Gymnast 2	Score
Dara Stoyanova	25.266	Nino Kvantaliani	22.866
Vera Tugolukova	26.633	Nikolina Lekovic	24.100
Zahra Jafarova	23.099	Lily Ramonatxo	24.416
Meital Maayan Sumkin	27.666	Mariami Kajaia	21.866

==== Cross battles last 8 round with ====
Gymnast 1	Score	Gymnast 2	Score
Stiliana Nikolova	29.532	Maria Avgousti	25.032
Amalia Lica	27.166	Karolina Havlikova	18.700

==== Cross battles last 8 round with ====
Gymnast 1	Score	Gymnast 2	Score
Dara Stoyanova	28.633	Vera Tugolukova	28.332
Lily Ramonatxo	26.799	Meital Maayan Sumkin	27.499

==== Cross battles last 4 round with clubs ====
Gymnast 1	Score	Gymnast 2	Score
Stiliana Nikolova	30.633	Amalia Lica	26.666
Dara Stoyanova	25.233	Meital Maayan Sumkin	28.966

==== Cross battle bronze medal round with ====
Gymnast 1	Score	Gymnast 2	Score
Amalia Lica	26.966	Dara Stoyanova	28.366

==== Cross battle gold medal round with ====
Gymnast 1	Score	Gymnast 2	Score
Stiliana Nikolova	27.866	Meital Maayan Sumkin	29.000

==== Juniors ====
===== Teams =====
Rank	Nation	Total
1st place, gold medalist(s)	Bulgaria	103.248
2nd place, silver medalist(s)	Israel	97.897
3rd place, bronze medalist(s)	Hungary	94.730
4	Georgia	93 197
5	Estonia	90.948
6	Azerbaijan	90.130
7	Romania	89.263
8	Cyprus	88.697

==== Hoop ====
Rank	Gymnast	Nation	D Score	E Score	A Score	Pen	Total
1st place, gold medalist(s)	Sofiya Gandlin	Israel	8.900	7.566	7.666		24.132
2nd place, silver medalist(s)	Maša Nikolić	Serbia					24.866
3rd place, bronze medalist(s)	Patricia Stanciu	Romania					
4	Magdalena Valkova	Bulgaria				0.300	
5	Elena Vukmir	Hungary					
6	Maria Sokolova	Cyprus					
7	Nita Jamagidze	Georgia				0.300	
8	Aleksandra Selyska	Czech Republic					

==== Ball ====
Rank	Gymnast	Nation	D Score	A Score	E Score	Pen	Total
1st place, gold medalist(s)	Alice Rozenberg	Israel				0.050	
2nd place, silver medalist(s)	Nita Jamagidze	Georgia					
3rd place, bronze medalist(s)	Patricia Stanciu	Romania					
4	Antoaneta Tsankova	Bulgaria					
5	Margarita Drozdova	Estonia					
6	Sofia Diana Christofi	Cyprus					
7	Elena Vukmir	Hungary					
8	Aleksandra Selyska	Czech Republic				0.350	

==== Clubs ====
Rank	Gymnast	Nation	D Score	A Score	E Score	Pen	Total
1st place, gold medalist(s)	Anastasia Kaleva	Bulgaria					
2nd place, silver medalist(s)	Fidan Gurbanli	Azerbaijan					
3rd place, bronze medalist(s)	Patricia Stanciu	Romania					
4	Sofiya Gandlin	Israel					
5	Sofia Diana Christofi	Cyprus					
6	Nino Batatunashvili	Georgia					
7	Dusika Zujko	Serbia					
8	Anastassija Davodova	Estonia					

==== Ribbon ====
Rank	Gymnast	Nation	D Score	A Score	E Score	Pen	Total
1st place, gold medalist(s)	Magdalena Valkova	Bulgaria					
2nd place, silver medalist(s)	Shams Aghahuseynova	Azerbaijan					
3rd place, bronze medalist(s)	Alice Rozenberg	Israel					
4	Margarita Drozdova	Estonia					
5	Elena Vukmir	Hungary					
6	Sofie Berveno	Czech Republic					
7	Maria Sokolova	Cyprus					
8	Maša Nikolić	Serbia					

==== Group All-Around ====
Rank	Nation	5	5	Total
1st place, gold medalist(s)	Bulgaria	25.950	24.750	50.700
2nd place, silver medalist(s)	Israel	25.700	24.000	49.700
3rd place, bronze medalist(s)	Azerbaijan	23.500	20.500	44.000
4	Hungary	24.050	19.600	43.650
5	Georgia	22.650	19.450	42.100
6	Czech Republic	19.400	21.650	41.050

==== 5 Hoops ====
Rank	Nation	D Score	A Score	E Score	Pen	Total
1st place, gold medalist(s)						
2nd place, silver medalist(s)						
3rd place, bronze medalist(s)						
4						
5						
6						
7						
8						

==== 10 Clubs ====
Rank	Nation	D Score	A Score	E Score	Pen	Total
1st place, gold medalist(s)						
2nd place, silver medalist(s)						
3rd place, bronze medalist(s)						
4						
5						
6						
7						
8						

== Medal table ==
=== Combined ===
Rank	Nation	Gold	Silver	Bronze	Total
1	Bulgaria (BUL)	16	5	3	24
2	Israel (ISR)	7	7	6	20
3	Ukraine (UKR)	4	3	2	9
4	Italy (ITA)	3	5	2	10
5	Azerbaijan (AZE)	1	3	6	10
6	Hungary (HUN)	1	0	5	6
7	Poland (POL)	0	2	0	2
7	Uzbekistan (UZB)	0	2	0	2
9	Romania (ROM)	0	1	5	6
10	Cyprus (CYP)	0	1	1	2
10	Estonia (EST)	0	1	1	2
12	Georgia (GEO)	0	1	0	1
12	Serbia (SER)	0	1	0	1
14	Czech Republic (CZE)	0	0	1	1
Totals (14 entries)		32	32	32	96

=== Baku ===
* Host nation (Azerbaijan)

Rank	Nation	Gold	Silver	Bronze	Total
1	Bulgaria	6	2	2	10
2	Ukraine	4	3	1	8
3	Italy	2	5	2	9
4	Israel	2	2	2	6
5	Azerbaijan*	1	0	4	5
6	Poland	0	2	0	2
7	Estonia	0	1	1	2
8	Uzbekistan	0	1	0	1
9	Hungary	0	0	2	2
10	Romania	0	0	1	1
Totals (10 entries)		15	16	15	46

=== Burgas ===
* Host nation (Bulgaria)

Rank	Nation	Gold	Silver	Bronze	Total
1	Bulgaria*	10	4	1	15
2	Israel	2	2	3	7
3	Hungary	1	0	3	4
4	Cyprus	0	1	1	2
4	Romania	0	1	1	2
6	Azerbaijan	0	1	0	1
Totals (6 entries)		13	9	9	31
