= Viktoriia Dorofieieva =

Ukrainian rhythmic gymnast

- Вікторія Дорофєєва
- Born: 6 March 2010 (age 16) Lutsk, Ukraine

Gymnastics career
- Discipline: Rhythmic gymnastics
- Country represented: Ukraine; (since 2024)
- Club: Deriugins School
- Head coach: Irina Deriugina
- Choreographer: Iryna Blokhina
Medal record
Rhythmic Gymnastics
Representing Ukraine
European Cup
Silver medal – second place	2025 Baku	Junior Clubs

Viktoriia Dorofieieva (Ukrainian: Вікторія Дорофєєва; born 6 March 2010) is a Ukrainian rhythmic gymnast. She represents Ukraine in international competitions.

== Career ==
=== Junior ===
In November 2024 she won gold among juniors in front of Taisiia Redka, Liubov Gorashchenko and Anna Vykhodets at the Ukrainian Cup.

In late February 2025 she made her international debut at the Miss Valentine Grand Prix in Tartu, winning gold with clubs and bronze with clubs. In May she competed at the European Cup in Baku, where she took 4th place in teams (along Gorashchenko, Vykhodetsat and Sofiia Krainska) and won silver in the clubs final behind Antoaneta Tsankova. She didn't take part in the Junior World Championships, despite being initially registered, the motivation given was that Ukraine's junior individuals were preparing for "bigger competitions". In July she took gold in the All-Around and with ribbon as well as silver with ball at the Ukrainian national championships. In September she won silver in the All-Around at the Brno International Tournament.

=== Senior ===
Dorofieieva became age eligible for senior competitions in 2026, debuting at the Miss Valentine tournament in Tartu.
