= Sofia Jakovleva =

Estonian rhythmic gymnast

- Born: 18 October 2010 (age 15) Estonia

Gymnastics career
- Discipline: Rhythmic gymnastics
- Country represented: Estonia; (2023–present)
- Club: Võimlemisklubi Elegance
- Head coach: Irina Stadnik
- Assistant coach: Natalja Ratšejeva
Medal record
Representing Estonia
Rhythmic Gymnastics
Junior World Championships
Bronze medal – third place	2025 Sofia	5 Hoops
European Cup
Bronze medal – third place	2025 Baku	Ball

Sofia Jakovleva (born 18 October 2010) is an Estonian rhythmic gymnast. She represents Estonia at international competitions.

At the national level, she is the 2025 Estonian all-around champion, the 2023 Estonian all-around Junior champion and a two-time (2024, 2025) Estonian all-around Junior silver medalist.

== Career ==
=== Junior ===
In 2023, she was selected to represent Estonia at the 2023 World Junior Championships in Cluj-Napoca, Romania. Originally planned to compete only with clubs her teammate Valeria Valasevits was injured and Jakovleva was able to compete on all four apparatus, obtaining a best placing with ribbon (12th in the qualification).

In 2024, Sofia won silver medal in all-around at Estonian National Championships. She competed at the 2024 Junior European Championships in Budapest. Together with Elys Kretelle Kukk and Anna Karolina Obolonina they took 6th place in Team competition. She qualified to the clubs final and took 7th place.

In 2025, she joined national junior group, but simultaneously competed as individual. In April, she won silver medal in all-around at Estonian National Championships. She also won gold medals in ball and clubs and silver in hoop and ribbon finals. In May, she competed at the 2025 European Cup in Baku, Azerbaijan. She won bronze medal in ball final. On June 4-8, Sofia and her teammates (Alexandra Ivahnenko, Kristiina Jegorova, Ekaterina Korzikskaja, Anastasia Nemerovskaja and Anna Karolina Obolonina) represented Estonia at the 2025 European Junior Championships in Tallinn, Estonia. They took 5th place in group all-around, 4th place in 10 Clubs final and 6th place in 5 Hoops final. Later that month, they competed at the 2025 Junior World Championships in Sofia, Bulgaria. Sofia competed with ball (15th place) and clubs (13th place). In group, they took 6th place in all-around and qualified to 5 hoops final, where they won a historic bronze medal.

=== Senior ===
Jakovleva became age eligible for senior competitions in 2026, debuting at the Miss Valentine Grand Prix in Tartu where she took bronze in the clubs and silver in the ribbon final. In March, she competed at Aphrodite Cup in Greece, where she took 11th place in all-around and won gold medal in ribbon. In April, she won gold medal in all-around at Estonian National Championships. She also won bronze medals in hoop and clubs, gold in ball and silver in ribbon.

== Routine music information ==
Year	Apparatus	Music title
2026	Hoop	
2026	Ball	Maison by Emilio Piano & Lucie
2026	Clubs	Diamonds Are A Girl's Best Friend / Material Girl by Glee Cast
2026	Ribbon	Dark Mirror by Power-Haus & Christian Reindl
2025	Hoop	À nos folies by Léa Paci
2025	Ball	Experience by Ludovico Einaudi
2025	Clubs	Diamonds Are A Girl's Best Friend / Material Girl by Glee Cast
2025	Ribbon	
