= Maya Gamliel =

Israeli rhythmic gymnast

- Born: 15 June 2008 (age 18) Israel

Gymnastics career
- Discipline: Rhythmic gymnastics
- Country represented: Israel; (2024-present)
- Club: Kfar Saba
- Head coach: Ayelet Zussman
Medal record
Representing Israel
Rhythmic gymnastics
Event	1st	2nd	3rd
FIG European Cup	1	0	1
Total	1	0	1
European Championships
Silver medal – second place	2025 Tallinn	Group All-around
Bronze medal – third place	2025 Tallinn	Team
European Cup
Gold medal – first place	2025 Burgas	5 Ribbons
Bronze medal – third place	2025 Burgas	Cross Battle

Maya Gamliel (Hebrew: מאיה גמליאל; born 15 June 2008) is an Israeli rhythmic gymnast. She represents Israel in international competitions as a member of the Israeli national senior group.

== Career ==
Gamliel was incorporated into the Israeli national senior group in 2024, as a reserve.

In 2025, after all the gymnasts that competed at the Paris Olympics retired, she became part of the new group. In May competing at the European Cup stage in Burgas along Agam Gev, Kristina Eilon Ternovski, Arina Gvozdetskaia, Varvara Salenkova and Lian Suharevich, she won gold with 5 hoops and bronze in the cross battle. In June she was selected for the European Championships in Tallinn. There she and her group won silver in the all-Around and bronze in team. In July, group competed at Cluj-Napoca World Challenge Cup and won bronze medal in all-around behind Spain and Poland. They took 4th place in 5 ribbons and 6th place in balls+hoops final.

In August, she was selected to compete at the 2025 World Championships in Brazil, alongside Kristina Eilon Ternovski, Agam Gev, Varvara Salenkova and Arina Gvozdetskaia. They took 5th place in the all-around and qualified to both finals. In the exercise with 5 ribbons, they were 4th, and in the exercise with hoops and balls, they were 6th.
