= Barbare Kajaia =

Georgian rhythmic gymnast

- Born: 3 October 2010 (age 16) Tbilisi, Georgia

Gymnastics career
- Discipline: Rhythmic gymnastics
- Country represented: Georgia; (2023-)
- Club: Neli Saladze Academy
- Head coach: Eliso Bedoshvili
Medal record
Representing Georgia
Junior European Championships
Bronze medal – third place	2024 Budapest	Ribbon

Barbare Kajaia (born 3 October 2010) is a Georgian rhythmic gymnast. She represents her country in international competitions.

== Personal life ==
Her older sister Mariami Kajaia is also a famous Georgian rhythmic gymnast.

== Career ==
=== Junior ===
In early April 2023, she was 12th in the all-around at the MTM International tournament in Ljubljana. In November she was a dancer for the Georgian entry at the Junior Eurovision Song Contest in Nice, France.

In 2024 she was 8th in the all-around and 6th with hoop at the Ritam Cup in Belgrade. She also won bronze with clubs. In early May she competed at the first European Cup in Baku, where she was 9th in teams and 5th in the ribbon final. She was selected for the European Championships and took 19th place in teams. In the event finals, she won bronze with the ribbon behind Amalia Lică and Dara Malinova.

She was selected to represent Georgia the 2025 Junior World Championships in Sofia, competing only with ribbon and finishing on 25th place.

=== Senior ===
In 2026, Barbare mad her senior international debut at World Challenge Cup Beijing, where she took 21st place in all-around. In July, she competed at World Cup Milan, taking 59th place in all-around.

== Routine music information ==
Year	Apparatus	Music title
2025	Hoop	
2025	Ball	
2025	Clubs	
2025	Ribbon	The Pitch (Spectacular Spectacular) (from Moulin Rouge 2) by Jim Broadbent, Nicole Kidman, Jacek Koman, John Leguizamo, Ewan McGregor
2024	Hoop	
2024	Ball	
2024	Clubs	
2024	Ribbon	Be Italian by Fergie
