= Elena Vukmir =

Hungarian rhythmic gymnast

- Born: 4 June 2010 (age 16) Budapest

Gymnastics career
- Discipline: Rhythmic gymnastics
- Country represented: Hungary (2023-)
- Club: MTK Budapest
Medal record
Representing Hungary
Rhythmic Gymnastics
European Cup
Bronze medal – third place	2025 Burgas	Junior Team
Bronze medal – third place	2025 Baku	Junior Hoop
Gymnasiades
Silver medal – second place	Bahrain 2024	Hoop
Bronze medal – third place	Bahrain 2024	Ball

Elena Vukmir (born 4 June 2010) is a Hungarian rhythmic gymnast of Serbian descent. She represents Hungary in international competitions.

== Personal life ==
Elena is the daughter of Serbian former footballer and coach Dragan Vukmir.

== Career ==
=== Junior ===
Vukmir made her international debut in 2023, when she was selected to compete at the 2nd Junior World Championships in Cluj-Napoca. There she was 10th in teams along Boglarka Barkoczi, 18th with hoop and 11th with ball.

In March 2024 she took 21st place overall and 8th in the ball final at the Aphrodite Cup in Athens. A couple of months later she took part in the 1st Rhythmic Gymnastics European Cup in Baku, where she was 11th in teams and 6th with hoop. In May she was 13th in the All-Around, 8th with hoop and 6th with ball at the European Championships in her native Budapest. In late October she competed at the Gymnasiade in Bahrain, winning silver with hoop and bronze with ball.

In 2025, she competed at the 2025 European Cup in Baku, Azerbaijan and won bronze medal in hoop final. She was 5th in ribbon final and 5th in team competition together with Regina Orvendi and Franciska Hesz.

== Routine music information ==
Year	Apparatus	Music title
2025	Hoop	Wonder Woman Main Theme by Tina Guo
2025	Ball	Another One Bites The Dust by Alexander Jean
2025	Clubs	Stop That Girl! By Daniel Pemberton
2025	Ribbon	Crown Of Vengeance By Timothy Shortell & Hypersonic Music
2024	Hoop	Wonder Woman Main Theme by Tina Guo
2024	Ball	Arrival Of The Birds by The Cinematic Orchestra
2024	Clubs	Stop That Girl! By Daniel Pemberton
2024	Ribbon	Ghostbusters by Ray Parker
2023	Hoop	Another Day of Sun by La La Land Cast
2023	Ball	I Am A Ghost by Andrew Hewitt
2023	Clubs	
2023	Ribbon	
