= Kristina Eilon Ternovski =

Ukrainian born Israeli gymnast (born 2008)

- Born: 19 July 2008 (age 18) Ukraine

Gymnastics career
- Discipline: Rhythmic gymnastics
- Country represented: Israel (2024-present)
- Head coach: Ayelet Zussman
Medal record
Representing Israel
Rhythmic gymnastics
Event	1st	2nd	3rd
FIG European Cup	1	0	0
FIG World Cup	0	1	0
Total	1	1	0
European Championships
Silver medal – second place	2025 Tallinn	Group All-around
Bronze medal – third place	2025 Tallinn	Team
European Cup
Gold medal – first place	2025 Burgas	5 Ribbons
Bronze medal – third place	2025 Burgas	Cross Battle

Kristina Eilon Ternovski (Hebrew: קריסטינה אילון טרנובסקי; born 19 July 2008) is a Ukrainian born Israeli rhythmic gymnast. She represents Israel as a member of the group.

== Career ==
=== Senior ===
Originally from Kyiv, Ukraine, Ternovski started representing Israel in 2024. In March, she made her international debut as individual at Aphrodite Cup in Athens, Greece. She took 4th place in the all-around. In finals, she was 4th in hoop, 7th in clubs and 8th in ball and ribbon. Later she competed at the 2024 World Challenge Cup in Portimão, being 6th in the All-Around, 5th with hoop, 5th with ball, 6th with clubs and 9th with ribbon.

In 2025, after all the gymnasts that competed at the Paris Olympics retired, she became part of the new group. At the World Cup in Baku they were 4th in the All-Around, 8th with 3 ribbons & 2 hoops, winning silver with 5 ribbons. In May competing at the European Cup stage in Burgas along Maya Gamliel, Agam Gev, Arina Gvozdetskaia, Varvara Salenkova and Lian Suharevich, she won gold with 5 hoops and bronze in Cross Battle. In June she was selected for the European Championships in Tallinn. There she and her group won silver in the all-around and bronze in team. In July, group competed at Cluj-Napoca World Challenge Cup and won bronze medal in all-around behind Spain and Poland. They took 4th place in 5 ribbons and 6th place in balls+hoops final.

In August, she was selected to compete at the 2025 World Championships in Brazil, alongside Maya Gamliel, Agam Gev, Varvara Salenkova and Arina Gvozdetskaia. They took 5th place in the all-around and qualified to both finals. In the exercise with 5 ribbons, they were 4th, and in the exercise with hoops and balls, they were 6th.
