= Patricia Stanciu =

Romanian rhythmic gymnast

- Born: 14 April 2011 (age 15) Bucharest, Romania

Gymnastics career
- Discipline: Rhythmic gymnastics
- Country represented: Romania; (2025-)
- Club: ACS Dandri
- Head coach: Adriana Mitroi
Medal record
Rhythmic Gymnastics
Representing Romania
European Cup
Silver medal – second place	2026 Baku	Junior Hoop
Bronze medal – third place	2025 Burgas	Junior Hoop
Bronze medal – third place	2025 Burgas	Junior Ball
Bronze medal – third place	2025 Burgas	Junior Clubs

Patricia Stanciu (born 14 April 2011) is a Romanian rhythmic gymnast. She represents Romania in international competitions.

== Career ==
=== Junior ===
In 2025 Stanciu became a junior and competed in the European Cup stage in Burgas, being 7th in teams and winning bronze with hoop, with ball and with clubs. Ten days later she won gold in teams (along Rebecca Ulvoczki), with hoop, with ball and with clubs at the 24th Irina Deleanu Cup in Brasov. In June she was selected for the 3rd Junior World Championships in Sofia, taking 10th place overall, 20th with hoop, 7th with ball and 19th with clubs. In October she took part in the Aeon Cup in Tokyo along Amalia Lică and Ileana Dutu as part of the ACS Dandri club, there they took 5th place overall.

She debuted in 2026 at the Aphrodite Cup, winning bronze with ball. Competing with hoop, ball and clubs at the European Cup in Baku she took silver with hoop.

== Routine music information ==
Year	Apparatus	Music Title
2026	Hoop	
2026	Ball	
2026	Clubs	Let The Pieces Fall by Kohshi Kamata & Hypersonic Music
2026	Ribbon	
2025	Hoop	Slipping into Chaos by Power-Haus & Joni Fuller
2025	Ball	
2025	Clubs	Let The Pieces Fall by Kohshi Kamata & Hypersonic Music
2025	Ribbon	Spider-Man Theme by Michael Bublé
