= Liubov Gorashchenko =

Ukrainian rhythmic gymnast

- Любов Горащенко
- Born: 9 May 2010 (age 16) Odessa, Ukraine

Gymnastics career
- Discipline: Rhythmic gymnastics
- Country represented: Ukraine; (2024-)
- Club: Deriugins School
- Head coach: Irina Deriugina
- Choreographer: Iryna Blokhina
Medal record
Rhythmic Gymnastics
Representing Ukraine
European Cup
Gold medal – first place	2025 Baku	Junior Ribbon

Liubov Gorashchenko (Ukrainian: Любов Горащенко; born 9 May 2010) is a Ukrainian rhythmic gymnast. She represents Ukraine in international competitions.

== Career ==
In 2022 with the start of the war in Ukraine, Gorashchenko temporarily moved to Spain and competed at the Spanish National Championships.

=== Junior ===
In October 2024 she took part in the Dalia Kutkaite Cup, winning silver in the clubs final. In November she tied with Anna Vykhodets for bronze among juniors, behind Taisiia Redka and Viktoriia Dorofieieva, at the Ukrainian Cup.

In late February 2025 she participated at the Miss Valentine Grand Prix in Tartu, winning gold with hoop and silver with ribbon. In May she competed at the European Cup in Baku, where she took 4th place in teams (along Dorofieieva, Vykhodetsat and Sofiia Krainska) and won gold with ribbon. She didn't take part in the Junior World Championships, despite being initially registered, the motivation given was that Ukraine's junior individuals were preparing for "bigger competitions". In July she tied with Redka for bronze in the All-Around, also winning bronze with hoop and gold with clubs at the Ukrainian national championships. In September she won gold in the All-Around at the Brno International Tournament. In October she was selected for the AEON Cup in Japan along Taisiia Onofriichuk and Polina Karika, winning gold in teams and being 5th among juniors.

=== Senior ===
She turned senior in 2026. In May, she made her World Cup debut at World Challenge Cup in Portimão, and took 24th place in all-around. In June, she competed at World Challenge Cup in Cluj-Napoca, and ended on 32nd place in all-around.
