= Maša Nikolić =

Serbian rhythmic gymnast

- Маша Николић
- Born: 5 July 2010 (age 16) Belgrade, Serbia

Gymnastics career
- Discipline: Rhythmic gymnastics
- Country represented: Serbia; (2023-)
- Club: Ritam
- Head coach: Milena Reljin
- Assistant coach: Marija Stefanovic
Medal record
Representing Serbia
Rhythmic Gymnastics
European Cup
| Silver medal – second place | 2025 Burgas | Junior Hoop |

Maša Nikolić (Serbian Cyrillic: Маша Николић; born 5 July 2010) is a Serbian rhythmic gymnast. She represents Serbia in international competitions.

== Career ==
Nikolić made her international debut in 2021, competing at the MTM Narodni dom tournament in Ljubljana where she won bronze in the All-Around and silver with ball. On November 20 she took part in the Youth Tournament held in Svilajnac, winning silver in the All-Around, bronze in free-hands and with the apparatus as well as gold in teams.

=== Junior ===
She became a junior in 2023, being selected for the 2nd Junior World Championships in Cluj-Napoca, Romania. There she took 45th place with hoop and 52nd with ball. In September she participated in the Balkan Championships finishing 4th with hoop and 5th with clubs.

In May 2024 she competed in the European Championships in Budapest, Hungary, ending on 30th place in the All-Around, 35th with hoop and 19th with ball.

In 2025, she competed at the European Cup in Burgas, there she was 8th with ribbon and made history by winning a silver medal in the hoop final, the first for Serbia in a major competition at both junior and senior level. In June she was then selected for the 2025 Junior World Championships in Sofia, being 17th with hoop, 30th with ball and 40th with ribbon. In October she took part in the Balkan Championships in her native Belgrade, winning gold with hoop and bronze with ribbon.

=== Senior ===
In 2026, she made her international senior debut at Sofia World Cup, where she took 58th place in all-around. Then she competed at Baku World Cup, ending on 50th place in all-around. In early May, she competed at European Cup in Baku. Her highest placement was with hoop - 19th place. She represented Serbia at the 2026 European Championships in Varna, and took 39th place in all-around qualifications. In August, she competed at her first senior World Championships in Frankfurt, Germany, and took 70th place in all-around qualifications. Afterwards, she ended on 17th place in all-around qualifications at the 2026 Mediterranean Games in Taranto, Italy.

== Achievements ==
- First Serbian rhythmic gymnast to win a medal in a competition organized by World Gymnastics since Serbia's independence.

== Routine music information ==
| Year | Apparatus | Music title |
|---|---|---|
| 2026 | Hoop | Mesecina / Moonlight by Goran Bregović |
| 2026 | Ball | El Tango de Roxanne by José Feliciano, Ewan McGregor & Jacek Koman |
| 2026 | Clubs | 99 Luftballons (40th Anniversary Remastered 2023) by Nena |
| 2026 | Ribbon | Sapphire by Ed Sheeran |
| 2025 | Hoop | Mesecina / Moonlight by Goran Bregović |
| 2025 | Ball | El Tango de Roxanne by José Feliciano, Ewan McGregor & Jacek Koman |
| 2025 | Clubs | |
| 2025 | Ribbon | |
| 2024 | Hoop | Aide (Original Mix) by Bang La Decks |
| 2024 | Ball | |
| 2024 | Clubs | Welcome to Wonderland by Janet Dacal, Karen Mason, Edward Staudenmayer, Danny Stiles, Kate Shindle & Wonderland Ensemble |
| 2024 | Ribbon | |
