= Varvara Salenkova =

Israeli rhythmic gymnast

- Born: 13 June 2007 (age 19) Ukraine

Gymnastics career
- Discipline: Rhythmic gymnastics
- Country represented: Israel; (2024-present)
- Club: Maccabi Tel Aviv
- Head coach: Ayelet Zussman
Medal record
Rhythmic gymnastics
Representing Israel
Event	1st	2nd	3rd
FIG European Cup	1	0	0
FIG World Cup	0	1	0
Total	1	1	0
European Championships
Silver medal – second place	2025 Tallinn	Group All-around
Bronze medal – third place	2025 Tallinn	Team
European Cup
Gold medal – first place	2025 Burgas	5 Ribbons
Bronze medal – third place	2025 Burgas	Cross Battle

Varvara Salenkova (Hebrew: ורברה סלנקוב; born 13 June 2007) is a Ukraine-born Israeli rhythmic gymnast. She represents Israel as a member of the Israeli senior group.

== Career ==
Salenkova was included into the Israeli senior group in 2024, she was named the reserve gymnast to Ofir Shaham, Diana Svertsov, Adar Friedmann, Romi Paritzki and Shani Bakanov at the Olympic Games in Paris.

In 2025, after all the gymnasts that competed at the Olympics retired, she became part of the new group. At the World Cup in Baku they were 4th in the All-Around, 8th with 3 ribbons & 2 hoops, winning silver with 5 ribbons. In May competing at the European Cup stage in Burgas along Maya Gamliel, Kristina Eilon Ternovski, Arina Gvozdetskaia, Agam Gev and Lian Suharevich, she won gold with 5 hoops and bronze in the cross battle. In June she was selected for the European Championships in Tallinn. There she and her group won silver in the all-around and bronze in team. In July, group competed at Cluj-Napoca World Challenge Cup and won bronze medal in all-around behind Spain and Poland. They took 4th place in 5 ribbons and 6th place in balls+hoops final. In August, she was selected to compete at the 2025 World Championships in Brazil, alongside Maya Gamliel, Agam Gev, Kristina Eilon Ternovski and Arina Gvozdetskaia. They took 5th place in the all-around and qualified to both finals. In the exercise with 5 ribbons, they were 4th, and in the exercise with hoops and balls, they were 6th.

In early 2026 it was revealed that she finished her career as part of the national group. She retired from rhythmic gymnastics and switched sports to archery.
