= Antoaneta Tsankova =

Bulgarian rhythmic gymnast (born 2011)

- Антоанета Цанкова
- Born: 18 September 2011 (age 15) Burgas, Bulgaria

Gymnastics career
- Discipline: Rhythmic gymnastics
- Country represented: Bulgaria; (2023-)
- Club: Avangard
- Former coach: Nikolay Boev
Medal record
Rhythmic Gymnastics
Representing Bulgaria
European Cup
Gold medal – first place	2025 Baku	Junior Team
Gold medal – first place	2025 Baku	Junior Clubs
Gold medal – first place	2025 Burgas	Junior Team

Antoaneta Tsankova (Bulgarian: Антоанета Цанкова; born 18 September 2011) is a Bulgarian rhythmic gymnast. She represents Bulgaria in international competitions.

== Career ==
Tsankova took up the sport when she was six years old. In 2023, she won gold in the all-around among pre-juniors at the Bulgarian Championships, repeating the result with ball and with clubs, winning a silver medal with ribbon as well. In October she was selected to join the national team.

The following year she won silver at the national clubs championships, representing Avangard with Svetlizara Petkova and Yuliana Dimitrova. In April she competed out of competition at the 2024 Sofia Cup. Later that year she took bronze at nationals, behind Alexandra Petrova and Siyana Alekova. In June she was confirmed into the national team. That year she also won two silver and one bronze medals at the Balkan Games.

In 2025 she was 5th with ball and won gold with hoop at the Bosphorus Cup. At the Sofia Cup she won gold in teams, as part of "Bulgaria 1", as well as in the clubs final. On May 1–4, she competed at European Cup Baku and won gold medal in team (with Aleksa Rasheva and Magdalena Valkova) and with clubs. At the stage in her native Burgas she was 4th with ball and again won gold in teams, with Valokova and Anastasia Kaleva. She then was crowned vice champion of Bulgaria, winning gold with clubs. At the Balkan Championships she took gold with clubs. In December she topped the all-around among juniors at the "Christmas Stars" tournament.

In late January 2026, she took 4th place at the first national control training, behind Dea Emilova, Viktoria Lilkina and Siyana Alekova.

In April, a complaint was filed against her coach, Nikolay Boev, by Neviana Vladinova, the head judge at a competition Tsankova participated in and the vice-president of the Bulgarian Rhythmic Gymnastics Federation, alleging he had been physically violent toward Tsankova. The Federation fined Boev, notified the state agency for child protection, and suspended him from working as Tsankova's coach and from contact with the national team.

In October, she competed at International Tournament Aura Cup in Zagreb, Croatia. She was 6th in the all-around and won gold in ball and silver in clubs final.

== Routine music information ==
Year	Apparatus	Music title
2026	Hoop	Amma (feat. Sivamani) James Asher
2026	Ball	Amore cannibale by Gianna Nannini
2026	Clubs	
2026	Ribbon	
2025	Hoop	Time to Go Crazy by Rishi & Harshil
2025	Ball	Amore cannibale by Gianna Nannini
2025	Clubs	Emergency by Icona Pop
2025	Ribbon	Slavic Queen by Filip Lackovic
