= Mariami Kajaia =

Georgian rhythmic gymnast

- Born: 29 October 2007 (age 18) Tbilisi, Georgia

Gymnastics career
- Discipline: Rhythmic gymnastics
- Country represented: Georgia (2022-)
- Club: Neli Saladze Academy
- Head coach: Eliso Bedoshvili
- Assistant coach: Salome Pazhava

Mariami Kajaia (Georgian: მარიამი კაჯაია; born 29 October 2007) is a Georgian rhythmic gymnast. She represents her country in international competitions.

== Personal life ==
Her younger sister Barbare Kajaia is also a Georgian rhythmic gymnast.

== Career ==
=== Junior ===
In March 2022, at the MTM Narodni tournament, she won silver behind Tara Dragas. She later represented Georgia at the European Championships in Tel Aviv, Israel. Together with teammate Liana Toidze, she took 19th place in the team competition, contributing the clubs and ribbon score.

=== Senior ===
She made her senior international debut at the 2023 European Championships in Baku, Azerbaijan, where she took 28th with hoop and 30th place with ribbon.

In 2024, she competed at the 2024 European Championships in Budapest, Hungary, taking 39th place in the all-around and 15th in the team competition with Anna Khutsishvili. In July, she made her World Cup debut at the Cluj-Napoca World Challenge Cup, taking 31st place in all-around.

In 2025, Kajaia started the season at Sofia World Cup, placing 60th in the all-around. In April, she won the Georgian national all-around title. In May, she took part in the 2025 European Cup in Burgas, Bulgaria. She finished in15th place in all-around, and in the finals, 6th in ball and 7th in ribbon. On 4-8 June, she represented Georgia at the 2025 European Championships in Tallinn, Estonia. She ended in 49th place in the all-around qualifications and did not advance into the all-around final. In late August, she debuted at the World Championships in Rio de Janeiro, Brazil. The only Georgian gymnast competing, she was 69th in all-around qualifications.

== Routine music information ==
Year	Apparatus	Music title
2025	Hoop	Games (from Wonder Woman 1984) by Hans Zimmer
2025	Ball	El Silencio by Caro Luna
2025	Clubs	
2025	Ribbon	Lights That Flicker by Tonal Chaos Trailer Music
2024	Hoop	
2024	Ball	Me Voy (I am leaving) by Yasmin Levy
2024	Clubs	Mon amour by Slimane
2024	Ribbon	The Game is Afoot by Eternal Eclipse
