= Magdalena Valkova =

Bulgarian rhythmic gymnast (born 2010)

- Магдалена Вълкова
- Born: 6 January 2010 (age 16) Sofia, Bulgaria

Gymnastics career
- Discipline: Rhythmic gymnastics
- Country represented: Bulgaria; (2023-)
- Club: Iliana
- Head coaches: Rayna Tosheva (2023-2025); Vesela Dimitrova (2026-present)
- Assistant coaches: Violeta Gospodorska (until 2025); Yasena Stoyneva (2026-present)
- Choreographer: Svetlin Dimitrov
Medal record
Representing Bulgaria
| Event | 1st | 2nd | 3rd |
|---|---|---|---|
| FIG World Cup | 0 | 0 | 2 |
| Total | 0 | 0 | 2 |
World Championships
| Silver medal – second place | 2026 Frankfurt | Team |
| Bronze medal – third place | 2026 Frankfurt | 5 Balls |
Junior World Championships
| Gold medal – first place | 2025 Sofia | Team |
| Gold medal – first place | 2025 Sofia | Hoop |
| Bronze medal – third place | 2025 Sofia | Ribbon |
Junior European Championships
| Bronze medal – third place | 2024 Budapest | Ball |
European Cup
| Gold medal – first place | 2025 Burgas | Team |
| Gold medal – first place | 2025 Burgas | Hoop |
| Gold medal – first place | 2025 Baku | Team |
| Silver medal – second place | 2025 Baku | Hoop |
| Silver medal – second place | 2024 Baku | Team |
| Bronze medal – third place | 2024 Baku | Ball |
| Bronze medal – third place | 2025 Burgas | Ribbon |

Magdalena Valkova (Bulgarian: Магдалена Вълкова; born 6 January 2010) is a Bulgarian rhythmic gymnast. She is the 2025 World Junior gold medalist with hoop and the team competition and bronze medalist with ribbon. She is the 2024 European Junior bronze medalist with ball. At the national level she is the 2025 Junior National all-around gold medalist and the 2024 Junior National all-around silver medalist.

== Career ==
In 2018 Valkova, aged 8, made some performances at the World Championships in Sofia.

=== Junior ===
In 2021, she won bronze in the national junior club championships with Levski Iliana. She was 4th in the national individual championships, and won silver in the group championships. The following year she became the national junior champion and won the national clubs championships as a member of Iliana.

In 2023, she ended 5th in team competition with Dara Malinova, at the Gymnastik International, taking the same place in the ribbon final. She then competed at the Sofia Cup tournament. At the national championships she was 4th behind Elvira Krasnobaeva, Nikol Todorova and Dara Stoyanova. As a member of the club Iliana she won gold in the Bulgarian clubs championships.

Competing at Miss Valentine in 2024, Valkova won gold in team competition and with ball. She won All-Around's silver among the girls born in 2010 at the Aphrodite Cup, ending 4th with hoop and 6th with ball. Valkova, Raya Chervenkova and Ambra-Maria Dimitrova won silver at the national championships for clubs. Selected for the 1st edition of the European Cup she won silver in teams, along Dara Malinova, and bronze with ball. At nationals she won silver in the All-Around behind Malinova. She also won gold medals in hoop and ball finals and silver in clubs and ribbon finals.

In March 2025, she won gold with hoop, silver with ball and bronze with ribbon at the Aphrodite Cup. On May 1–4, she competed at European Cup Baku and won gold medal in team (with Aleksa Rasheva and Antoaneta Tsankova) and silver in hoop. On May 15–18, she competed at European Cup Burgas, where she and her teammates won gold in team again. She also won gold in ribbon final. In the end of May, Magdalena became the 2025 Bulgarian Junior champion in all-around. She also won gold in hoop and ribbon finals and bronze in clubs final. In June, she was selected to represent Bulgaria at the 2025 Junior World Championships in Sofia, where she won gold medal in hoop and bronze medalist in ribbon. She and her teammates Anastasia Kaleva, Aleksa Rasheva and junior group also won gold medal in team competition. In September it was revealed she integrated the national senior group for the following season.

=== Senior ===
She became age eligible for senior competitions in 2026, debuting at the World Cup in Sofia, winning bronze in the group all-around. In Baku they were 8th in the All-Around, 12th with 5 balls and took bronze with 3 hoops & 4 clubs. In August, she was chosen to represent Bulgaria alongside Raya Bozhilova, Magdalina Minevska, Emilia Obretenova and Rachel Stoyanov at the 2026 World Championships in Frankfurt, Germany. In group all-around competition they finished off the podium, on 6th place, due to mistakes in 5 Balls routine. They won bronze medals in both apparatus finals and silver medal in team competition alongside Eva Brezalieva and Stiliana Nikolova.

== Routine music information ==
| Year | Apparatus | Music title |
|---|---|---|
| 2025 | Hoop | White Rabbit by Jefferson Airplane |
| 2025 | Ball | Earth by Elitsa Todorova, Stoyan Ynakoulov |
| 2025 | Clubs | Mueve El Esqueleto by 3+2 |
| 2025 | Ribbon | One Moment in Time by Whitney Houston |
| 2024 | Hoop | Deadwood / New Blood by Production Music |
| 2024 | Ball | The Storm by HAVASI |
| 2024 | Clubs | Cuba 2012 by Latin Formation (DJ Rebel StreetDance 2 Remix) |
| 2024 | Ribbon | |
