= Agam Gev =

Israeli rhythmic gymnast

- אגם גב
- Born: 25 November 2008 (age 17)

Gymnastics career
- Discipline: Rhythmic gymnastics
- Country represented: Israel; (2024-present)
- Club: Hapoel Ramat Eliyahu
- Head coach: Ayelet Zussman
Medal record
Rhythmic gymnastics
Representing Israel
Event	1st	2nd	3rd
FIG European Cup	1	1	1
FIG World Cup	2	1	1
FIG World Challenge Cup	1	1	2
Total	4	3	4
European Championships
Silver medal – second place	2025 Tallinn	Group All-around
Silver medal – second place	2026 Varna	Team
Bronze medal – third place	2025 Tallinn	Team
Bronze medal – third place	2026 Varna	Group All-around
Bronze medal – third place	2026 Varna	5 Balls
Bronze medal – third place	2026 Varna	3 Hoops + 4 Clubs
European Cup
Gold medal – first place	2025 Burgas	5 Ribbons
Gold medal – first place	2026 Baku	5 Balls
Silver medal – second place	2026 Baku	Cross Battle
Bronze medal – third place	2025 Burgas	Cross Battle

Agam Gev (Hebrew: אגם גב; born 25 November 2008) is an Israeli rhythmic gymnast. She represents Israel in international competitions as a member of the group.

== Career ==
Gev was incorporated into the Israeli national senior group in 2024, as a reserve.

In 2025, after all the gymnasts that competed at the Paris Olympics retired, she became part of the new group. At the World Cup in Baku they were 4th in the All-Around, 8th with 3 ribbons & 2 hoops, winning silver with 5 ribbons. In May competing at the European Cup stage in Burgas, she won gold with 5 hoops and bronze in the cross battle. Later she was selected for the European Championships in Tallinn. There she won silver in the All-Around and bronze in team. In July, group competed at Cluj-Napoca World Challenge Cup and won bronze medal in all-around behind Spain and Poland. They took 4th place in 5 ribbons and 6th place in balls+hoops final.

In August, she was selected to compete at the 2025 World Championships in Brazil, alongside Maya Gamliel, Arina Gvozdetskaia, Varvara Salenkova and Kristina Eilon Ternovski. They took 5th place in the all-around and qualified to both finals. In the exercise with 5 ribbons, they were 4th, and in the exercise with hoops and balls, they were 6th.

She was confirmed into the 2026 renovated group. In March, at the World Cup in Sofia the group was 12th in the All-Around, 7th with 5 balls and 16th with 3 hoops & 4 clubs. In Baku the group won gold in the All-Around and with 5 balls. On May 1-3, the group competed at European Cup in Baku, and won gold medal in 5 Balls. They lost against Bulgarian team in Cross battles and won silver medal. On May 16, in the World Challenge Cup in Portimão, the group won a bronze medal at the all-around competition.

In May, at the European Championships in Varna, Gev won three bronze medals with the Israeli Senior Group: in the group all-around, in the 5 balls final, and in the hoops and clubs final. She also won a silver medal in the team competition with the senior group and with Israeli individual gymnasts Daniela Munits and Alona Tal-Franco.
