= Zahra Jafarova =

- Born: 1924; Baku, Azerbaijan SSR
- Died: 25 April 2015 (aged 90–91); Baku, Azerbaijan
- Citizenship: Soviet Union; Republic of Azerbaijan
- Occupation: Scholar

Zahra Huseyn gizi Jafarova (b. 1924; Baku, Azerbaijan SSR - d. 2005; Baku, Azerbaijan) was a professor, Honored Art Worker, founder, and leader of the organ department at the Azerbaijan State Conservatory. Zahra Jafarova was associated with the inception of the first organ music in Azerbaijan.

== Life ==
Zahra Jafarova was born in 1924 in Baku. Her family is originally from the Dağ Kəsəmən village of the Qazakh region. She studied music at the Azerbaijan State Conservatory in 1947 and from 1951 at the Saint Petersburg Conservatory, majoring in organ performance.

Between 1961 and 1991, Zahra Jafarova led the organ department at the Azerbaijan State Conservatory, where she laid the foundation. She worked as a professor and wrote various books on organ music and general music topics. Some of her works include "Formation of Organ Art in Azerbaijan," "Organ and Organ Art," and "Issues Related to the Interpretation of Azerbaijani Composers' Works for Organ."

She died in Baku in 2005.

== Sources ==
- Əhmədli, Salatın; Babanlı, Rövşən (2017). Qazax mahalının alimləri. Baku: Günəş.
