= Dara Malinova =

Bulgarian rhythmic gymnast (born 2009)

- Дара Малинова
- Born: 27 February 2009 (age 17) Sofia, Bulgaria

Gymnastics career
- Discipline: Rhythmic gymnastics
- Country represented: Bulgaria; (2021-)
- Club: Sofia Sport 2017
- Head coach: Valentina Ivanova
- Former coach: Valentina Ivanova
- Choreographer: Svetlin Dimitrov
Medal record
Representing Bulgaria
European Cup
Silver medal – second place	2024 Baku	Team
Bronze medal – third place	2024 Baku	Hoop
Bronze medal – third place	2024 Baku	Clubs
Bronze medal – third place	2025 Baku	Clubs
Junior European Championships
Silver medal – second place	2024 Budapest	Ribbon

Dara Malinova (Bulgarian: Дара Малинова; born 27 February 2009) is a Bulgarian rhythmic gymnast. She is the 2024 European Junior silver medalist in ribbon. At the national level she is the 2024 National Junior all-around champion.

== Career ==
Dara took up gymnastics at age 5, as her mom, a former national swimmer, and one of her friends brought her to the CSKA club's hall. At the age of 7 Silvia Stoyneva took her to the club "Levski" where she stayed for another 2 years. In 2018, Krisi Shikerova founded the Sofia Sport Club, where Dara followed Bozhidara Racheva, who was her coach until she joined the national team.

=== Junior ===
In 2021 she won silver in the national junior club championships with Sofia Sport 2017. In the All-Around of the state championship she won the title. She won gold with hoop, silver with ball, bronze with ribbon and 4th with clubs, thus being included into the elite category. Dara also won silver in the national individual championships, behind Eva Emilova, and with hoop and ball as well as gold with clubs and ribbon. At the first control training of 2022 she was 2nd in the All-Around and with ball, 3rd with hoop. In the second control she was 5th in the All-Around. She then took part in the Sofia Cup.

In 2023, at the Miss Valentine tournament in Tartu she won silver in teams along Elvira Krasnobaeva and Nikol Todorova. She ended 5th in teams, with Magdalena Valkova, at the Gymnastik International, winning bronze in the hoop final. At the AGF Trophy in Baku she won bronze with clubs, she ranked 5th with ball, 6th with hoop and 8th with ribbon. During the national championships she won four bronze medals, in the All-Around, with hoop, clubs and ribbon.

Competing at Miss Valentine in 2024 Malinova won gold in teams, with hoop, clubs and bronze with ribbon. She won All-Around's bronze among the girls born in 2009 at the Aphrodite Cup, getting another bronze with ribbon. Dara, Aleksa Rasheva and Ida Stefanova won the national championships for clubs. After winning bronze in teams at the Sofia IT, she managed to obtain a bronze and a gold medal in the hoop and ribbon finals. Selected for the 1st edition of the European Cup she won silver in teams, and bronze with hoop and clubs. At nationals she won gold in the All-Around. She also won gold medals in clubs and ribbon finals and bronze in ball.

=== Senior ===
Malinova became a senior in 2025, debuting at the Miss Valentine Grand Prix in Tartu. In May, she competed at the 2025 European Cup in Baku, Azerbaijan and won bronze medal in clubs and was 5th in ball. In Cross battle part of competition, she was beaten by Daniela Munits in 1st round with hoop. In the end of May, she took 7th place in all-around behind at Bulgarian National Championships. She also won silver medal in ball and bronze in hoop and ribbon finals.

== Routine music information ==
Year	Apparatus	Music title
2026	Hoop	
2026	Ball	Nocturne/Bohemian Rhapsody by Lucia Micarelli
2026	Clubs	Stronghold by Ivan Torrent
2026	Ribbon	Filet by Benoit Jutras
2025	Hoop	It's A Man's World (Live) by Luciano Pavarotti, James Brown
2025	Ball	Purple Rain by Prince & The Revolution
2025	Clubs	Shadow Hunter by Power-Haus, Christian Reindl and Lucie Paradis
2025	Ribbon	U Plavu Zoru by Pink Martini
2024	Hoop	Unchained Melody Live at Ann Arbor, MI by Elvis Presley
2024	Ball	Io Ti Penso Amore by Nicole Scherzinger and David Garrett
2024	Clubs	L'Amour est un Oiseau Rebelle (Remix) by The Math Club
2024	Ribbon	Floki Appears to Kill Athelstan from The Vikings III by Trevor Morris
