= Dara Stoyanova =

Bulgarian rhythmic gymnast (born 2008)

- Born: 24 March 2008 (age 18) Pazardzhik, Bulgaria

Gymnastics career
- Discipline: Rhythmic gymnastics
- Country represented: Bulgaria; (2022–present)
- Club: SK Iliana
- Head coach: Guergana Boteva Tlays
Medal record
Representing Bulgaria
Rhythmic Gymnastics
Junior European Championships
Bronze medal – third place	2022 Tel Aviv	Team
European Cup
Silver medal – second place	2025 Burgas	Hoop
Bronze medal – third place	2025 Burgas	Cross Battle

Dara Stoyanova (Bulgarian: Дара Стоянова; born 24 March 2008) is a Bulgarian individual rhythmic gymnast.

== Personal life ==
Stoyanova was born in Pazardzhik. She has an older brother.

== Career ==
Stoyanova began training when she was four. She was noticed by her first coach because of her ability to focus on training despite her young age at the time.

=== Junior ===
In 2022, she was selected, along with Elvira Krasnobaeva, to represent Bulgaria at the 2022 European Championships in Tel Aviv, where she won a bronze medal in the team competition. She also qualified to the clubs final and finished 4th.

Stoyanova started the 2023 season at the Miss Valentine Tournament in Tartu, along with Elvira Krasnobaeva, Nikol Todorova and Dara Malinova. She and her Bulgarian teammates won silver in the junior team event behind Ukraine and above Kazakhstan. In May, she won the bronze medal in the all-around behind Elvira Krasnobaeva and Nikol Todorova at Bulgarian National Championships.

=== Senior ===
At the end of the 2024 season, Stoyanova was added to the main senior national team.

In 2025, she started her season at the Miss Valentine tournament in Tartu, Estonia and won the gold medal in the team event together with Oleksandra Shalueva. She also won the gold medals in all four apparatus finals. In March, she competed at the Aphrodite Cup in Athens and finished in 18th place in the all-around. She took the silver medal in the clubs final and 7th place in ball. At the International Tournament Sofia Cup at the end of March, she won the silver medal in all-around behind Stiliana Nikolova and qualified to three apparatus finals. She won silver in hoop and clubs and was 4th in ribbon.

On 18-20 April, she made her World Cup debut at the World Cup Baku, where she ended in 17th place in the all-around and did not advance into any apparatus finals. On 15-18 May, she competed at European Cup in Burgas. She won bronze medal in Cross Battle competition and silver medal in Hoop. In the end of May, Dara won silver medal in all-around behind Stiliana Nikolova at Bulgarian National Championships. She also won silver medal in clubs and bronze in ball final. In June, she represented Bulgaria together with Stiliana Nikolova and Eva Brezalieva at the 2025 European Championships in Tallinn, Estonia. Together with senior group they were 5th in team competition. Dara was performing only with ribbon, finishing 20th in qualifications.

Stoyanova started her 2026 season competing at Tartu Grand Prix, finishing on 7th place in all-around due to mistakes in ribbon routine. She won silver medal in hoop and took 6th place in ball final. In March, she competed at Aphrodite Cup in Greece, where she won bronze medal in all-around and silver medals in hoop and ribbon. In early April, she competed at Thiais Grand Prix and took 15th place in all-around. She was 8th in ball and 5th in ribbon final. On April 10–12, she took 9th place in all-around at World Cup Tashkent. She qualified to hoop final, finishing 6th.

== Routine music information ==
Year	Apparatus	Music Title
2026	Hoop	Champion by Nicole Serrano & Tommee Profitt
2026	Ball	Bad To The Bone by George Thorogood & The Destroyers
2026	Clubs	Free Your Mind (45 Version) by En Vogue from the Funky Divas collection
2026	Ribbon	Torre De Babel (Wisin & Yandel Remix) by David Bisbal
2025	Hoop	Flamenco Bolero by Gustavo Montesano & Royal Philharmonic Orchestra
2025	Ball	Romani Holiday (Antonius Remix) by Hans Zimmer
2025	Clubs	Pain it, Black by Ciara
2025	Ribbon	Torre De Babel (Wisin & Yandel Remix) by David Bisbal
2023	Hoop	Soulseeker by Thomas Bergersen
2023	Ball	The Witch's Daughter by Ashley Serena
2023	Clubs	Umbrella by Scott Bradlee's Postmodern Jukebox, Casey Abrams, The Sole Sisters
2023	Ribbon	Something's Got a Hold On Me by Beth Hart & Joe Bonamassa
2022	Hoop	Warrirors by League of Legends Music, 2WEI, Edda Hayes
2022	Ball	
2022	Clubs	The Rhythm of the Night by Corona, Dreams (Will Come Alive) by 2 Brothers on the 4th Floor, The Power by Snap!, Gonna Make You Sweat (Everybody Dance Now) by C+C Music Factory
2022	Ribbon	
