= Avigail Shved =

Israeli rhythmic gymnast

- אביגיל שווד
- Born: 28 April 2010 (age 16)

Gymnastics career
- Discipline: Rhythmic gymnastics
- Country represented: Israel (2025-present)
- Head coach: Ayelet Zussman
- Assistant coach: Julieta Cantaluppi
- Former coach: Linoy Ashram
Medal record
Representing Israel
Rhythmic gymnastics
Event	1st	2nd	3rd
FIG World Cup	2	0	1
FIG World Challenge Cup	1	1	2
Total	3	1	3
European Championships
Silver medal – second place	2026 Varna	Team
Bronze medal – third place	2026 Varna	Group All-around
Bronze medal – third place	2026 Varna	5 Balls
Bronze medal – third place	2026 Varna	3 Hoops + 4 Clubs
Junior European Championships
Silver medal – second place	2025 Tallinn	10 Clubs
Bronze medal – third place	2025 Tallinn	5 Hoops
European Cup
Gold medal – first place	2026 Baku	5 Balls
Silver medal – second place	2025 Baku	Junior 5 Hoops
Silver medal – second place	2025 Burgas	Junior Group All-Around
Silver medal – second place	2025 Burgas	Junior 5 Hoops
Silver medal – second place	2025 Burgas	Junior 10 Clubs
Silver medal – second place	2026 Baku	Cross Battle
Bronze medal – third place	2025 Baku	Junior Group All-Around

Avigail Shved (Hebrew: אביגיל שווד; born 28 April 2010) is an Israeli group rhythmic gymnast. She represents Israel in international competitions.

== Career ==
=== Junior ===
In late 2024, Shved was called up to enter the new Israeli junior group under the guidance of Julieta Cantaluppi and Linoy Ashram.

In March 2025, the group made its international debut at the Sofia International Tournament, winning gold with 5 pairs of clubs as well as silver in the all-around and with 5 hoops. In May, competing at the European Cup in Baku, she won bronze in the all-around and silver with 5 hoops. Two weeks later, the group took all three silver medals at the European Cup stage in Burgas.

A month later, Shved was selected for the European Championships in Tallinn along with her teammates Melani Malka, Keren Sobol, Emilia Roitman and Sofia Prezhyn. They placed 4th overall, and in the finals, they won bronze with 5 hoops and silver with 10 clubs.

In June, Shved was supposed to take part in the Junior World Championships in Sofia, but their participation was cancelled due to the Twelve-Day War. In late December, it was announced that she was to join the senior group.

=== Senior ===
Shved became age-eligible for senior competitions in 2026. She made her debut at the World Cup in Sofia, where she and her group members were 12th in the all-around, 7th with 5 balls and 16th with 3 hoops & 4 clubs. In Baku the group won gold in the All-Around and with 5 balls. On May 1-3, the group competed at European Cup in Baku, and won gold medal in 5 Balls. They lost against Bulgarian team in Cross battles and won silver medal. On May 16-17 the group competed at the World Challenge Cup in Portimão and won two bronze medals: in the all-around competition, and in the 5 balls final. In the end of May, at the 2026 European Championships in Varna, Shved won three bronze medals with the Israeli Senior Group: in the group all-around, in the 5 balls final, and in the hoops and clubs final. She also won a silver medal in the team competition with the senior group and with Israeli individual gymnasts Daniela Munits and Alona Tal-Franco.
