= Aleksa Rasheva =

Bulgarian rhythmic gymnast (born 2010)

- Алекса Рашева
- Born: 14 April 2010 (age 16) Sofia, Bulgaria

Gymnastics career
- Discipline: Rhythmic gymnastics
- Country represented: Bulgaria (2023–)
- Club: Sofia Sport 2017
- Head coach: Bozhidara Racheva
Medal record
Rhythmic Gymnastics
Representing Bulgaria
Junior World Championships
Gold medal – first place	2025 Sofia	Team
European Cup
Gold medal – first place	2025 Baku	Team

Aleksa Rasheva (Bulgarian: Алекса Рашева; born 14 April 2010) is a Bulgarian rhythmic gymnast. She represents Bulgaria in international competitions.

== Biography ==
In 2021 Rasheva won bronze in the national junior club championships for Sofia Sport 2017 along Ida Stefanova and Dara Malinova.

=== Junior ===
In October 2023 she was selected to enter the Bulgarian national team.

In March 2024 she won team gold along Dara Malinova, Magdalena Valkova and Oleksandra Shalueva, at Miss Valentine in Tartu. Two weeks later she took 15th place in the All-Around, 7th among gymnasts born in 2010, at the Aphrodite Cup. She then won the national club championships along Malinova and Stefanova. In April she competed at the Sofia International Tournament in a team along Shauleva. At the Unity Cup in Warsaw she took silver in the All-Around. At the Bulgarian Championships she took bronze, behind Malinova and Valkova, in the junior category. In June she was confirmed in the national team.

In 2025 she won bronze in teams at Miss Valentine along Magdalena Valkova as well as getting another bronze in the ribbon final. She then took part in the Aphrodite Cup, being 7th in the All-Around. She competed at the Sofia Cup she was part of "Bulgaria 3" along Dea Emilova, also winning gold with ball. At the Desislava's Necklace tournament she took gold in the All-Around. In May she was selected for the European Cup in Baku, winning gold in teams along Valkova and Antoaneta Tsankova and she was 5th with ball. At nationals she took gold in the ball final. In June she was selected for the 3rd Junior World Championships, competing with ball she made mistakes finishing 22nd and thus missing the final, nonetheless she won gold in teams along Anastasia Kaleva, Magdalena Valkova and the junior group.

=== Senior ===
Rasheva became age eligible for senior competitions in 2026, debuting at the Miss Valentine tournament in Tartu. She won gold in clubs, and was 8th in hoop, 5th in ball, 4th in ribbon final. Throughout the year, she participated to various international competitions, among which the Aphrodite Cup in March, where she placed 25th in the all-around and 6th in clubs final, and the International Tournament Sofia Cup.

== Routine music information ==
Year	Apparatus	Music title
2026	Hoop	The 5th by David Garrett
2026	Ball	La Despedida by CAMI
2026	Clubs	Quantum (Original Remix) by Eric May
2026	Ribbon	Yurudum (Oriental Mix) by KariZma feat Magomed Aliev
2025	Hoop	From Balkan With Love by Epic Generation
2025	Ball	The Time of Our Lives by Il Divo
2025	Clubs	Quantum (Original Remix) by Eric May
2025	Ribbon	Yurudum (Oriental Mix) by KariZma feat Magomed Aliev
