= Anania Dimitrova =

Bulgarian rhythmic gymnast (born 2010)

- Анания Димитрова
- Born: 4 October 2010 (age 16) Sofia

Gymnastics career
- Discipline: Rhythmic gymnastics
- Country represented: Bulgaria; (2023-)
- Club: Levski
Medal record
Rhythmic Gymnastics
Representing Bulgaria
Junior World Championships
Gold medal – first place	2025 Sofia	Team
Gold medal – first place	2025 Sofia	All-around
Gold medal – first place	2025 Sofia	5 Hoops
Bronze medal – third place	2025 Sofia	10 Clubs
European Cup
Gold medal – first place	2025 Baku	Junior Group All-Around
Gold medal – first place	2025 Baku	5 Hoops
Gold medal – first place	2025 Baku	10 Clubs
Gold medal – first place	2025 Burgas	Junior Group All-Around
Gold medal – first place	2025 Burgas	5 Hoops
Gold medal – first place	2025 Burgas	10 Clubs
Junior European Championships
Bronze medal – third place	2025 Tallinn	10 Clubs

Anania Dimitrova (Bulgarian: Анания Димитрова, born 4 October 2010) is a Bulgarian rhythmic gymnast. She represents Bulgaria in international competitions.

== Career ==
In May 2022 Dimitrova won the national title with ribbon. In 2023 she, Mia Alexandrova, Arina Shvets, Danaya Atanasova, Ivon Boshkilova, Radina Stoyanova, Plamena Petrova, Antonia Marinova, Eleonora Ivanova and Eva Emilova won bronze in the national club championships as part of Iliana. In October she entered the national team of Bulgaria. Later she won bronze with club at the Aura Cup in Zagreb.

The following year she was selected for the national junior group. In 2025 she won silver overall and gold with 5 hoops at the Bosphorus Cup. Later the group won bronze in the All-Around and gold with 5 hoops at the Aphrodite Cup in Athens. At the Sofia Cup they won gold in the All-Around and with 5 hoops. Competing at the European Cup in Baku the group won all three gold medals. They repeated the same results in Burgas. In May she took part in the European Championships in Tallinn, where she helped the group win bronze with 10 clubs.
