= Elena Hristova =

Bulgarian rhythmic gymnast (born 2011)

- Елена Христова
- Born: 3 May 2011 (age 15) United Kingdom

Gymnastics career
- Discipline: Rhythmic gymnastics
- Country represented: Bulgaria; (2024-)
- Club: Char DKS
Medal record
Rhythmic Gymnastics
Representing Bulgaria
Junior World Championships
Gold medal – first place	2025 Sofia	Team
Gold medal – first place	2025 Sofia	All-around
Bronze medal – third place	2025 Sofia	10 Clubs
European Cup
Gold medal – first place	2025 Baku	Junior Group All-Around
Gold medal – first place	2025 Baku	5 Hoops
Gold medal – first place	2025 Baku	10 Clubs
Gold medal – first place	2025 Burgas	Junior Group All-Around
Gold medal – first place	2025 Burgas	5 Hoops
Gold medal – first place	2025 Burgas	10 Clubs
Junior European Championships
Bronze medal – third place	2025 Tallinn	10 Clubs

Elena Hristova (Bulgarian: Елена Христова; born 3 May 2011) is a Bulgarian rhythmic gymnast. She represents Bulgaria in international competitions.

== Career ==
In 2023 Hristova, Irena Nedeva and Mariana Byankova won silver at the national club championships. Later she was 8th overall and won silver with clubs and bronze with hoop at the Bulgarian championships among 13 years old.

In 2024 she was selected for the national junior group. In 2025 she won silver overall and gold with 5 hoops at the Bosphorus Cup. Later the group won bronze in the All-Around and gold with 5 hoops at the Aphrodite Cup in Athens. At the Sofia Cup they won gold in the All-Around and with 5 hoops. Competing at the European Cup in Baku the group won all three gold medals. They repeated the same results in Burgas. In May she took part in the European Championships in Tallinn, where she helped the group win bronze with 10 clubs.
