= Yoana Moteva =

Bulgarian rhythmic gymnast (born 2010)

- Йоана Мотева
- Born: 20 October 2010 (age 16) Sofia

Gymnastics career
- Discipline: Rhythmic gymnastics
- Country represented: Bulgaria; (2023-)
- Club: Sofia Sport 2017
Medal record
Rhythmic Gymnastics
Representing Bulgaria
Junior World Championships
Gold medal – first place	2025 Sofia	Team
Gold medal – first place	2025 Sofia	All-around
Gold medal – first place	2025 Sofia	5 hoops
Bronze medal – third place	2025 Sofia	10 Clubs
European Cup
Gold medal – first place	2025 Baku	Junior Group All-Around
Gold medal – first place	2025 Baku	5 Hoops
Gold medal – first place	2025 Baku	10 Clubs
Gold medal – first place	2025 Burgas	Junior Group All-Around
Gold medal – first place	2025 Burgas	5 Hoops
Gold medal – first place	2025 Burgas	10 Clubs
Junior European Championships
Bronze medal – third place	2025 Tallinn	10 Clubs

Yoana Moteva (Bulgarian: Йоана Мотева, born 20 October 2010) is a Bulgarian rhythmic gymnast. She represents Bulgaria in international competitions.

== Career ==
In October 2023 Moteva entered the national team of Bulgaria. The following year she was selected for the national junior group.

In 2025 she won silver overall and gold with 5 hoops at the Bosphorus Cup. Later the group won bronze in the All-Around and gold with 5 hoops at the Aphrodite Cup in Athens. At the Sofia Cup they won gold in the All-Around and with 5 hoops. Competing at the European Cup in Baku the group won all three gold medals. They repeated the same results in Burgas. In May she took part in the European Championships in Tallinn, where she helped the group win bronze with 10 clubs.
