= Anastasia Kaleva =

Bulgarian rhythmic gymnast

- Анастасия Калева
- Born: 4 April 2010 (age 16) Odesa, Ukraine

Gymnastics career
- Discipline: Rhythmic gymnastics
- Country represented: Bulgaria (2025-)
- Club: Char
- Head coach: Filipa Filipova
Medal record
Rhythmic Gymnastics
Representing Bulgaria
Junior World Championships
Gold medal – first place	2025 Sofia	Team
European Cup
Gold medal – first place	2025 Burgas	Clubs

Anastasia Kaleva (Bulgarian: Анастасия Калева; born 4 April 2010) is a Bulgarian individual rhythmic gymnast. She represents Bulgaria in international competitions.

== Biography ==
Kaleva started training at age four in her native Odesa. In 2022, she moved to Bulgaria and began training at the Char club in Varna. Her new club assisted her in gaining Bulgarian citizenship, which was also helped by her father being a Bessarabian Bulgarian.

=== Junior ===
In March 2025, she made her debut for the Bulgarian national team at the Aphrodite Cup, where she was 9th in the all-around and 6th with clubs. At the Bosphorus Cup, she won gold in the all-around, with ball and with clubs. Later in the year, she competed as "Bulgaria 2" along with Siyana Alekova at the Sofia Cup. At the Desislava's Necklace tournament, she took silver in the all-around, behind Aleksa Rasheva, with hoop and with ribbon; she also won gold with clubs. In May, she won gold with clubs at the Pharaoh's Cup in Cairo.

Competing at the European Cup in Burgas in May, she was 15th in the all-around and won gold with clubs. She was then selected to compete with clubs at the 2025 Junior World Championships in Sofia, where she qualified for the apparatus final and finished 8th. She also won gold in teams along with her teammates Aleksa Rasheva, Magdalena Valkova and the junior group.

=== Senior ===
Kaleva became age-eligible to compete as a senior in 2026. On 10–12 April, she competed at the Tashkent World Cup and took 12th place in the all-around.

== Routine music information ==
Year	Apparatus	Music title
2026	Hoop	
2026	Ball	Hold On by Belle Sisoski
2026	Clubs	Speed by Billy Idol
2026	Ribbon	Adelante by Sash!
2025	Hoop	We Will Rock You by Halocene
2025	Ball	Hold On by Belle Sisoski
2025	Clubs	Speed by Billy Idol
2025	Ribbon	Нещо По-Така by Deep Zone Project
