= Vesela Dimitrova =

Bulgarian rhythmic gymnast

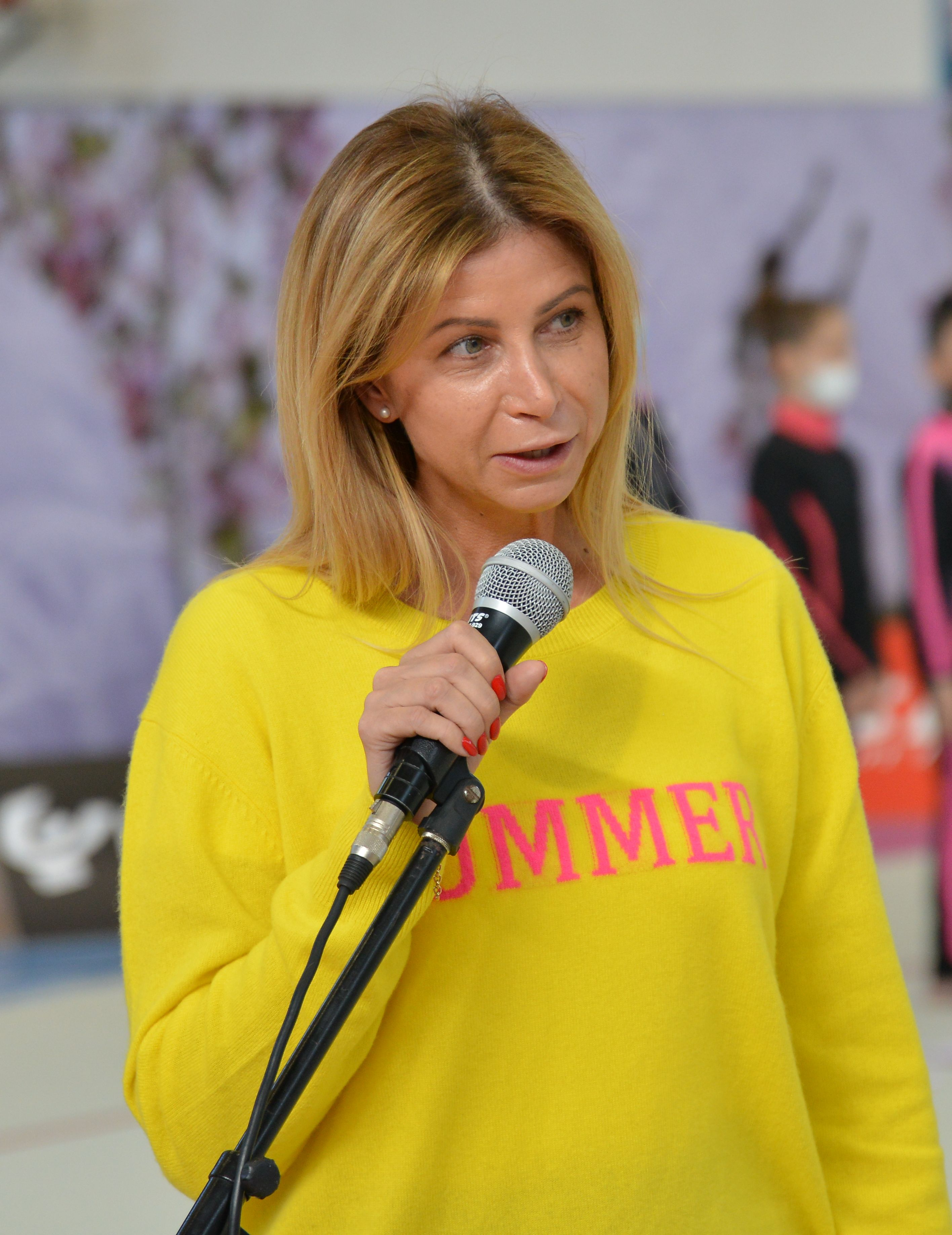

Personal information
- Full name: Vesela Dimitrova
- Born: 28 October 1975 (age 50) Sofia, Bulgaria

Gymnastics career
- Discipline: Rhythmic gymnastics
- Country represented: Bulgaria; (1991–1992)
- Club: Spartak Varna
- Head coach: Neshka Robeva

Vesela Dimitrova (Bulgarian: Весела Димитрова) is a Bulgarian rhythmic gymnast who is currently the head coach of the Bulgarian rhythmic gymnastics team. Vesela Dimitrova was born in Varna, Bulgaria, and started studying rhythmic gymnastics at a very young age, competing in clubs in Sofia.

== Career Timeline ==
Vesela’s career as a rhythmic gymnast ended early at the young age of 17. While most athletes in this sport end their career at around 22 years old, she finished her career early after playing at the World and European Championships. Stating that she was satisfied with what she had accomplished, Vesela went on to graduate from the National Sports Academy.

=== 2009 – 2013 ===
Between 2009 and 2013, Vesela was the head coach of the National Rhythmic Gymnastics in Switzerland. Under her coaching, the Swiss team won bronze at the 2013 Lisbon World Cup.

=== 2016 ===
In 2016, she took over the Bulgarian team from Ina Ananieva as the head coach of the women’s ensemble.

=== 2017 ===
In 2017, Vesela won the Coach of the Year recognition. She became the third rhythmic gymnastics coach after Neshka Robeva and Ina Ananieva to earn this recognition and win the Trud daily newspaper poll.

=== 2020 and 2021 ===
In 2020, the Bulgarian rhythmic gymnastics team won the gold medal at the all –around 2020 Summer Olympics in Tokyo. The gymnasts in the ensemble who won an Olympic medal were Simona Dyankova, Madlen Radukanova, Laura Traets, Erika Zafirova, and Stefani Kiryakova.

In 2021, Vesela was also named an official honorary citizen of Sofia in the honour books of the Sofia Municipal Council.

=== Present ===
Today, Vesela is still working as the head coach of the Bulgarian national ensemble with assistant coaches Mihaela Maevska and Yasena Stoyneva. The former was part of the Bulgarian ensemble winning gold in the Rhythmic Gymnastics World Championship 2014 and bronze medal in the all-around 2016 Summer Olympics.

Currently, she coaches her third ensemble since she started working for the Bulgarian team, made up of Sofia Ivanova, Rachel Stoyanov, Viktoria Georgieva, Sofia Pavlova, Suzan Pouladian, Alina Kolomiets, Ivon Boshkilova, and Danaya Atanasova.

== Personal life ==
After graduating from the National Sports Academy, Vesela married and had one daughter before starting her coaching career. Her daughter is also a gymnast, living in Switzerland with her father. In her free time, Vesela stated that she lives an ordinary life, spending time with friends in Sofia. Her hobbies include taking long walks, going to the cinema, and visiting escape rooms with her friends.
