= Rhythmic Gymnastics European Cup =

International rhythm gymnastics competition

The European Cup is a rhythmic gymnastics competition held by European Gymnastics. Its inaugural competition was held in 2024.

== Format ==
The European Cup has an experimental format compared to typical rhythmic gymnastics competitions. It is open to senior and junior individual gymnasts and seniors groups representing any FIG-affiliated federation.

=== Senior individuals ===
One or two gymnasts can compete per federation, and they must present 4 to 8 routines between them in the qualification round. The 16 highest-ranked gymnasts from the qualification round advance to a new 'cross battle' format. The cross battles consist of four bracketed rounds of competition where two gymnasts perform with the same apparatus and the gymnast with the higher score advances to the next round. There are also finals for each apparatus, competed by the top 8 highest-scoring individuals (with a maximum of one per federation) for that apparatus during the qualification round.

=== Senior groups ===
Groups perform both exercises in the qualification round, which determines the all-around standings. The top 8 highest-scoring groups for each exercise compete in the apparatus finals.

=== Junior individuals ===
One to four gymnasts may be entered per federation, and they perform four routines between them in the qualifying round. Countries with more than one entrant participate in the team competition; the scores of each gymnast representing a federation are added together to produce the team score. There are also finals for each apparatus, competed by the top 8 highest-scoring individuals (with a maximum of one per federation) for that apparatus during the qualification round.

== Editions ==
Year	Edition	Host city	Country
2024	1	Baku	Azerbaijan
2025	2	Baku, Burgas	Azerbaijan Bulgaria
2026	3	Baku	Azerbaijan

== All-time medal table ==
Updated May 3, 2026

Rank	Nation	Gold	Silver	Bronze	Total
1	Bulgaria	21	11	7	39
2	Israel	18	9	10	37
3	Authorised Neutral Athletes	7	5	3	15
4	Ukraine	5	4	6	15
5	Italy	4	11	7	22
6	Azerbaijan	1	6	8	15
7	Georgia	1	1	0	2
8	Hungary	1	0	7	8
9	Romania	0	5	7	12
10	Cyprus	0	2	3	5
11	Uzbekistan	0	2	1	3
12	Poland	0	2	0	2
13	Estonia	0	1	1	2
14	Serbia	0	1	0	1
15	Czech Republic	0	0	1	1
Totals (15 entries)		58	60	61	179

== See ==
- European Cup in Rhythmic Gymnastics (1989-1995)
