= 2026 in rhythmic gymnastics =

Below is a list of notable rhythmic gymnastics international events scheduled to be held in 2026 as well as the medalists.

== Retirements ==
Gymnasts who announced retirements in 2026
Gymnast	Country	Date	Ref
Justine Lavit	France	16 January 2026	
Salome Lozano Leon	France	29 January 2026	
Mireia Martínez	Spain	30 January 2026	
Milana Parfilova	Kazakhstan	4 February 2026	
Laura Paris	Italy	4 February 2026	
Erika Zhailauova	Kazakhstan	17 February 2026	
Saskia Broedelet	Australia	February 2026	
Lily Ramonatxo	France	7 April 2026	
Elvira Krasnobaeva	Russia	14 June 2026	
Khrystyna Pohranychna	Ukraine	6 September 2026	
Yelyzaveta Azza	Ukraine	14 September 2026	
Polina Horodnycha	Ukraine	14 September 2026	
Valeriia Peremeta	Ukraine	21 September 2026	
Cristina Korniychuk	Spain	13 October 2026	
Chiara Cortese	Italy	3 November 2026	

== Nationality changes ==
Gymnasts who changed nationalities in 2026
Gymnast	From	To	Ref
Lisa Garac	Romania	Germany	
Nicole Anwa Martyn	Israel	Sierra Leone	
Aleksandra Semenova	Russia	Israel	
Rachel Marcondes Levin	Costa Rica	Brazil	
Anna Pikaliuk	Ukraine	Croatia	

== Calendar of events ==
Date	Location	Event	Individual winners	Group winners
February 25–March 1	(Estonia) Tartu	Miss Valentine	AA: (Ukraine) Taisiia Onofriichuk HO: (Ukraine) Taisiia Onofriichuk BA: (Italy) Tara Dragas CL: (Poland) Liliana Lewinska RI: (Ukraine) Taisiia Onofriichuk	AA: Ukraine 5 BA: Ukraine 3 HO & 2 CL: Canada
March 28–30	(Bulgaria) Sofia	FIG World Cup	AA: (Ukraine) Taisiia Onofriichuk HO: (Ukraine) Taisiia Onofriichuk BA: (Ukraine) Taisiia Onofriichuk CL: (Bulgaria) Eva Brezalieva RI: (Ukraine) Taisiia Onofriichuk	AA: Authorised Neutral Athletes 5 BA: China 3 HO & 2 CL: Authorised Neutral Athletes
April 10–12	(Uzbekistan) Tashkent	FIG World Cup	AA: (Authorised Neutral Athletes) Maria Borisova HO: (Uzbekistan) Takhmina Ikromova BA: (Uzbekistan) Takhmina Ikromova CL: (Germany) Darja Varfolomeev RI: (Germany) Darja Varfolomeev	AA: China 5 BA: China 3 HO & 2 CL: China
April 17–19	(Azerbaijan) Baku	FIG World Cup	AA: (Ukraine) Taisiia Onofriichuk HO: (Ukraine) Taisiia Onofriichuk BA: (Germany) Darja Varfolomeev CL: (Germany) Darja Varfolomeev RI: (Germany) Darja Varfolomeev	AA: Israel 5 BA: Israel 3 HO & 2 CL: Spain
April 30 – May 3	(Azerbaijan) Baku	European Cup	Cross battle: (Israel) Daniela Munits HO: (Ukraine) Taisiia Onofriichuk BA: (Authorised Neutral Athletes) Arina Kovshova CL: (Israel) Daniela Munits RI: (Authorised Neutral Athletes) Maria Borisova	Cross battle: Bulgaria 5 BA: Israel 3 HO & 2 CL: Authorised Neutral Athletes (AIN 2)
April 30 – May 2	(South Africa) Tshwane	African Championships	TF: Egypt AA: (Egypt) Farida Bahnas HO: (Egypt) Lina Heleika BA: (Egypt) Farida Bahnas CL: (Egypt) Lina Heleika RI: (Egypt) Lina Heleika	AA: Egypt
April 30 – May 2	(South Africa) Tshwane	Oeanian Championships	TF: Australia AA: (Australia) Alicia Tan	AA: Australia
May 15–17	(Portugal) Portimão	FIG World Challenge Cup	AA: (Italy) Sofia Raffaeli HO: (Italy) Sofia Raffaeli BA: (Italy) Tara Dragas CL: (Israel) Alona Tal Franco RI: (Italy) Tara Dragas	AA: Spain 5 BA: Spain 3 HO & 2 CL: Germany
May 23–26	(Kyrgyzstan) Bishkek	Asian Championships	TF: Uzbekistan AA: (Uzbekistan) Takhmina Ikromova HO: (Uzbekistan) Takhmina Ikromova BA: (Uzbekistan) Takhmina Ikromova CL: (Uzbekistan) Takhmina Ikromova RI: (Uzbekistan) Takhmina Ikromova	AA: Uzbekistan 5 BA: China 3 HO & 2 CL: China
May 27–31	(Bulgaria) Varna	European Championships	TF: Bulgaria AA: (Germany) Darja Varfolomeev HO: (Russia) Sofia Ilteriakova BA: (Germany) Darja Varfolomeev CL: (Bulgaria) Stiliana Nikolova RI: (Germany) Darja Varfolomeev	AA: Spain 5 BA: Spain 3 HO & 2 CL: Spain
June 5 – 7	(Brazil) Rio de Janeiro	Pan American Championships	TF: Brazil AA: (Brazil) Bárbara Domingos HO: (Brazil) Geovanna Santos BA: (United States) Megan Chu CL: (Brazil) Bárbara Domingos RI: (Brazil) Geovanna Santos	AA: Brazil 5 BA: Brazil 3 HO & 2 CL: Brazil
June 19–21	(China) Beijing	FIG World Challenge Cup	AA: (China) Wang Qi HO: (Russia) Arina Kovshova BA: (Russia) Sofiia Ilteriakova CL: (Russia) Sofiia Ilteriakova RI: (Russia) Sofiia Ilteriakova	AA: China 5 BA: China 3 HO & 2 CL: China
June 26—28	(Romania) Cluj-Napoca	FIG World Challenge Cup	AA: (Germany) Darja Varfolomeev HO: (Germany) Darja Varfolomeev BA: (Poland) Liliana Lewisnka CL: (Germany) Darja Varfolomeev RI: (Ukraine) Taisiia Onofriichuk	AA: Israel 5 BA:Israel 3 HO & 2 CL: Israel
July 2–7	(Paraguay) Asunción	Senior South American Championships	TF: Brazil AA: (Brazil) Samara Sibin HO: (Argentina) Celeste D'Arcángelo BA: (Brazil) Samara Sibin CL: (Brazil) Sarah Mourão RI: (Argentina) Celeste D'Arcángelo	AA: Brazil 5 BA: Brazil 3 HO & 2 CL: Brazil
July 10–12	(Italy) Milan	FIG World Cup	AA: (Germany) Darja Varfolomeev HO: (Italy) Sofia Raffaeli BA: (Germany) Darja Varfolomeev CL: (Germany) Darja Varfolomeev RI: (Bulgaria) Stiliana Nikolova	AA: Brazil 5 BA: Spain 3 HO & 2 CL: China
July 24–August 8	(Dominican Republic) Santo Domingo	Central American and Caribbean Games	TF: Mexico AA: (Mexico) Marina Malpica HO: (Mexico) Ana Luisa Abraham BA: (Mexico) Marina Malpica CL: (Mexico) Marina Malpica RI: (Mexico) Marina Malpica	AA: Mexico 5 BA: Mexico 3 HO & 2 CL: Mexico
August 12–16	(Germany) Frankfurt	World Championships	TF: Authorised Neutral Athletes (Russia) AA: (Germany) Darja Varfolomeev HO: (Ukraine) Taisiia Onofriichuk BA: (Germany) Darja Varfolomeev CL: (Bulgaria) Stiliana Nikolova RI: (Germany) Darja Varfolomeev	AA: Spain 5 BA: Brazil 3 HO & 2 CL: Brazil
August 25–26	(Italy) Taranto	XX Mediterranean Games	AA: (Turkey) Hatice Gokce Emir	
September 12–26	Argentina	South American Games	AA: (Brazil) Maria Eduarda Alexandre HO: (Brazil) Maria Eduarda Alexandre BA: (Brazil) Barbara Domingos CL: (Brazil) Geovanna Santos RI: (Brazil) Maria Eduarda Alexandre	AA: Brazil 5 BA: Brazil 3 HO & 2 CL: Brazil
September 19–October 4	(Japan) Nagoya	Asian Games	AA: (Uzbekistan) Takhmina Ikromova	AA: China
November 4–8	(Colombia) Medellín	Junior South American Championships	TF: Brazil AA: (Brazil) Amanda Manente HO: (Brazil) Beatriz Vieira BA: (Brazil) Beatriz Vieira CL: (Brazil) Gisely Benevenuto RI: (Brazil) Amanda Manente	AA: Brazil 5 BA: Brazil 3 HO & 2 CL: Brazil

== Medalists ==
=== International events ===
Competition	Event	Gold	Silver	Bronze
World Championships	Individual All-Around	(Germany) Darja Varfolomeev	(Bulgaria) Stiliana Nikolova	(Italy) Sofia Raffaeli
World Championships	Hoop	(Ukraine) Taisiia Onofriichuk	(Italy) Sofia Raffaeli	(Germany) Darja Varfolomeev
World Championships	Ball	(Germany) Darja Varfolomeev	(Russia) Sofia Ilteriakova	(Russia) Maria Borisova
World Championships	Clubs	(Bulgaria) Stiliana Nikolova	(Ukraine) Taisiia Onofriichuk	(Russia) Maria Borisova
World Championships	Ribbon	(Germany) Darja Varfolomeev	(Bulgaria) Stiliana Nikolova	(Russia) Maria Borisova
World Championships	Group All-Around	Spain	Japan	Brazil
World Championships	5 Balls	Brazil	China	Bulgaria
World Championships	3 Hoops + 2 Clubs	Brazil	Spain	Bulgaria

=== Regional championships ===
Competition	Event	Gold	Silver	Bronze
African	Team	Egypt	South Africa	Angola
African	All-Around	(Egypt) Farida Bahnas	(Egypt) Lina Heleika	(South Africa) Stephanie Dimitrova
African	Hoop	(Egypt) Lina Heleika	(Egypt) Farida Bahnas	(Angola) Luana Gomes
African	Ball	(Egypt) Farida Bahnas	(Egypt) Farida Bahnas	(South Africa) Stephanie Dimitrova
African	Clubs	(Egypt) Lina Heleika	(Egypt) Farida Bahnas	(South Africa) Stephanie Dimitrova
African	Ribbon	(Egypt) Lina Heleika	(Angola) Luana Gomes	(South Africa) Stephanie Dimitrova
African	Group All-Around	Egypt	South Africa	—N/a
Asian	Team	Uzbekistan	Kazakhstan	China
Asian	All-Around	(Uzbekistan) Takhmina Ikromova	(Kazakhstan) Aibota Yertaikyzy	(Uzbekistan) Nataliya Usova
Asian	Hoop	(Uzbekistan) Takhmina Ikromova	(China) Wang Zilu	(Kazakhstan) Akmaral Yerekesheva
Asian	Ball	(Uzbekistan) Takhmina Ikromova	(China) Wang Zilu	(Kazakhstan) Akmaral Yerekesheva
Asian	Clubs	(Uzbekistan) Takhmina Ikromova	(Kazakhstan) Akmaral Yerekesheva	(Uzbekistan) Nataliya Usova
Asian	Ribbon	(Uzbekistan) Takhmina Ikromova	(Uzbekistan) Nataliya Usova	(Kazakhstan) Aibota Yertaikyzy
Asian	Group All-Around	Uzbekistan	China	Kazakhstan
Asian	5 Balls	China	Kazakhstan	South Korea
Asian	3 Hoops + 2 Clubs	China	Kazakhstan	Japan
European	Team	Bulgaria	Israel	Russia
European	All-Around	(Germany) Darja Varfolomeev	(Bulgaria) Stiliana Nikolova	(Ukraine) Taisiia Onofriichuk
European	Hoop	(Russia) Sofia Ilteriakova	(Belarus) Alina Harnasko	(Italy) Sofia Raffaeli
European	Ball	(Germany) Darja Varfolomeev	(Bulgaria) Stiliana Nikolova	(Russia) Sofia Ilteriakova
European	Clubs	(Bulgaria) Stiliana Nikolova	(Russia) Maria Borisova	(Israel) Daniela Munits
European	Ribbon	(Germany) Darja Varfolomeev	(Bulgaria) Stiliana Nikolova	(Russia) Maria Borisova
European	Group All-Around	Spain	Russia	Israel
European	5 Balls	Spain	Belarus	Israel
European	3 Hoops + 2 Clubs	Spain	Russia	Israel
Oceania	All-Around	(Australia) Alicia Tan	(Australia) Sofia Hemmings	(New Zealand) Havana Hopman
Oceania	Group All-Around	Australia	New Zealand	—N/a
Pan American	Team	Brazil	United States	Mexico
Pan American	All-Around	(Brazil) Bárbara Domingos	(United States) Megan Chu	(United States) Natalie de la Rosa
Pan American	Hoop	(Brazil) Geovanna Santos	(Brazil) Bárbara Domingos	(United States) Megan Chu
Pan American	Ball	(United States) Megan Chu	(Brazil) Maria Eduarda Alexandre	(Brazil) Bárbara Domingos
Pan American	Clubs	(Brazil) Bárbara Domingos	(Brazil) Maria Eduarda Alexandre	(United States) Megan Chu
Pan American	Ribbon	(Brazil) Geovanna Santos	(United States) Megan Chu	(Brazil) Bárbara Domingos
Pan American	Group All-Around	Brazil	United States	Mexico
Pan American	5 Balls	Brazil	United States	Mexico
Pan American	3 Hoops + 2 Clubs	Brazil	Mexico	United States

== Season's best international scores ==
Note: Only the scores of senior gymnasts from international events have been included below. Only one score per gymnast is included.

=== Individuals ===
==== All-Around ====
Rank	Name	Country	Score	Event
1	Taisiia Onofriichuk	Ukraine	116.600	Sofia World Cup
2	Stiliana Nikolova	Bulgaria	116.200	Sofia World Cup
3	Sofia Raffaeli	Italy	115.700	Sofia World Cup
4	Darja Varfolomeev	Germany	114.750	Baku World Cup
5	Maria Borisova	Authorised Neutral Athletes	113.500	Tashkent World Cup
6	Takhmina Ikromova	Uzbekistan	112.550	Baku World Cup
7	Alina Harnasko	Authorised Neutral Athletes	112.350	Sofia World Cup
8	Meital Maayan Sumkin	Israel	111.500	Sofia World Cup
9	Sofia Ilteriakova	Authorised Neutral Athletes	111.400	Baku World Cup
10	Eva Brezalieva	Bulgaria	111.150	Sofia World Cup

=== Groups ===
==== All-Around ====
Rank	Country	Score	Event
1	China	55.900	Tashkent World Cup
2	Israel	54.300	Baku World Cup
3	Authorised Neutral Athletes (AIN2)	54.250	Sofia World Cup
4	Germany	54.050	Sofia World Cup
4	Spain	54.050	Baku World Cup
6	Bulgaria	53.600	Sofia World Cup
7	Hungary	51.700	Baku World Cup
8	Kazakhstan	51.250	Tashkent World Cup
9	Authorised Neutral Athletes (AIN1)	51.100	Tashkent World Cup
10	Uzbekistan	50.850	Sofia World Cup
