= Miyabi Akiya =

Australian rhythmic gymnast

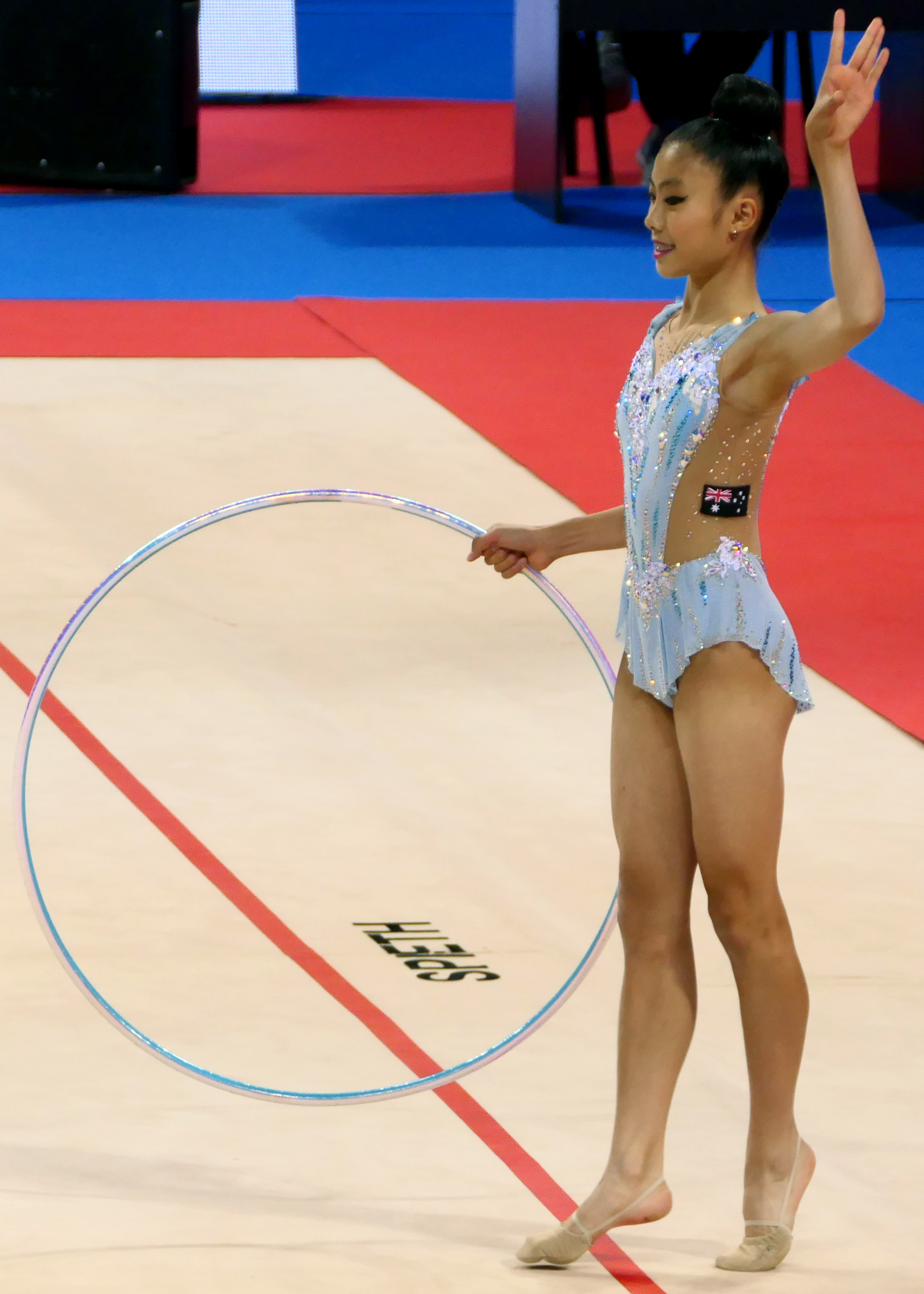
- Akiya at the 2024 World Cup Sofia

Personal information
- Born: 30 December 2008 (age 17) Parkville, Victoria

Gymnastics career
- Discipline: Rhythmic gymnastics
- Country represented: Australia (2024-)
Medal record
Rhythmic Gymnastics
Representing Australia
Oceanian Championships
Gold medal – first place	2025 Singapore	All-Around
Silver medal – second place	2024 Budapest	All-Around

Miyabi Akiya (born 30 December 2008) is an Australian individual rhythmic gymnast. She represents Australia in international competitions.

== Early life ==
Akiya was born on 30 December 2008 in Parkville, Victoria. She lives in Melbourne and has an older brother, and she speaks Japanese in addition to English.

She admires fellow gymnast Sofia Raffaeli.

== Career ==
Akiya took up the sport at the age of three, when she saw older students doing rhythmic gymnastics next to her in the kindergarten gym. Her mother enrolled her in a trial lesson, which Akiya enjoyed, so she enrolled in further lessons.

She made her international debut at the 2023 Junior World Championships in Cluj-Napoca. She competed with ball and ribbon and took 36th and 16th place, respectively, along with 29th in teams (with teammates Alisa Kochemazova and Alicia Tan). At the national level, she became the Australian junior all-around champion.

In 2024 she became a senior. She competed at the World Cup in Sofia, where she was 32nd in the all-around, 33rd with hoop, 36th with ball, 32nd with clubs and 30th with ribbon. In May, she competed in the Oceanian Championships in Budapest, taking silver behind Alexandra Kiroi-Bogatyreva. With that result, she was named the reserve gymnast for the Paris Olympics.

In April 2025, she took part in the World Cup in Baku, finishing 30th in the all-around, 41st with hoop, 35th with ball, 25th with clubs and 26th with ribbon. The following week, at the next World Cup stage in Tashkent, she improved on her scores and was 24th in the all-around, 27th with hoop, 17th with ball, 18th with clubs and 27th with ribbon. In May, she was selected for the Oceanian Championships in Singapore, where she was crowned the continental champion ahead of Havana Hopman and Polina Leonova.

In August 2025, she competed in the World Championships in Rio de Janeiro, finishing 31st in the all-around, 31st with hoop, 34th with ball, 27th with clubs and 47th with ribbon. She also finished 20th in the team ranking, together with teammates Isabella Wang, Polina Leonova and the Australian national group.

In April 2026, she took part in the World Cup in Tashkent, finishing 29th in the all-around, 30th with hoop, 56th with ball, 14th with clubs and 14th with ribbon; it was the only World Cup stage she took part in during the season. In June, she participated to the World Challenge Cup in Beijing, finishing 13th in the all-around, 10th with hoop, 20th with ball, 9th with clubs and 10th with ribbon. Despite being second reserve with the hoop, she took part to the apparatus final, where she finished 6th, due to the withdrawals of Wang Zilu (qualified 1st) and Geovanna Santos (qualified 9th, first reserve).

She wasn't selected to compete in the 2026 Oceania Championships, held in April-May in Tshwane. In August 2026, she participated to the World Championships in Frankfurt am Main, finishing 33rd in the all-around, 25th with hoop, 56th with ball, 18th with clubs and 44th with ribbon. She also finished 18th in the team ranking, together with teammates Sofia Hemmings, Veronika Ushakova and the Australian national group.

== Achievements ==
- First Australian rhythmic gymnast to qualify for an apparatus final at the World Cup.

== Routine music information ==
Year	Apparatus	Music title
2026	Hoop	Vivo Tango / Spanish Flame by Maxime Rodriguez
2026	Ball	Vampire - Olivia Rodrigo (Cello & Piano Cover) by Brooklyn Duo
2026	Clubs	The Four Seasons, Winter: Allegro / Allegro Non Molto by The Classical Royal Orchestra
2026	Ribbon	Revolution by Eternal Eclipse
2025	Hoop	La Cenerentola (Cinderella) by Sinfonia Varsovia, Yehudi Menuhin
2025	Ball	Vampire - Olivia Rodrigo (Cello & Piano Cover) by Brooklyn Duo
2025	Clubs	The Four Seasons, Winter: Allegro / Allegro Non Molto by The Classical Royal Orchestra
2025	Ribbon	Tears by Clean Bandit feat. Louisa Johnson
