= Nika Oborskaja =

Estonian rhythmic gymnast

- Born: 31 December 2009 (age 16)

Gymnastics career
- Discipline: Rhythmic gymnastics
- Country represented: Estonia (2023-2025)
- Head coaches: Julia Tjomuskina, Irina Stadnik, Natalja Ratsejeva
Medal record
Women's rhythmic gymnastics
Representing Estonia
European Cup
Silver medal – second place	2025 Baku	5 Ribbons

Nika Oborskaja (born 31 December 2009) is an Estonian rhythmic gymnast. She represents her country in international competitions as a member of the senior group.

== Career ==
=== Junior ===
In July 2023 Grigorenko was selected for the 2nd editions of the Junior World Championships in Cluj-Napoca as part of the national group. There, along Elys Kretelle Kukk, Kamila Grigorenko, Polina Tubaleva and Meibel Kudak, she took 8th place in the All-Around, 7th with 5 balls and 11th with 5 ropes.

=== Senior ===
In 2025, with the start of a new Olympic cycle, she integrated the new Estonian senior group composed by her, Ksenja Ozigina (the only remaining gymnast from the previous group), Elys Kretelle Kukk, Kamila Grigorenko, Polina Tubaleva and Johanna Simone Pertens. In April the group won two gold medals at the Grand Prix in Thiais. In early May they competed at the European Cup stage in Baku, winning silver in the All-Around and with 5 ribbons. In June, Nika and her group competed at the 2025 European Championships in Tallinn, Estonia. They took 4th place in all-around and 3 balls + 2 hoops, and finished 5th in 5 ribbons.

She announced her retirement from the sport via her Instagram profile, after she and Kamila Grigorenko were replaced with Valeria Valasevits and Ester Kreitsman.
