= Johana Babištová =

Czech rhythmic gymnast

- Born: 8 July 2010 (age 16) Ostrava, Czech Republic

Gymnastics career
- Discipline: Rhythmic gymnastics
- Country represented: Czech Republic (2024-present)
- Head coaches: Yuliana Lohachová, Petra Skálová
Medal record
Representing Czech Republic
Rhythmic Gymnastics
European Cup
Bronze medal – third place	2025 Burgas	10 Clubs

Johana Babištová (born 8 July 2010) is a Czech rhythmic gymnast.

== Career ==
In August 2022 Babištová became the national champion with clubs among pre juniors. The following year she was 5th overall and won bronze with hoop, silver with ball and gold with clubs at the Czech Championships. At the 2023 Prague Championship she took 6th place in the All-Around, 3rd place with ball, with clubs and with ribbon.

=== Junior ===
In 2024 she entered the junior national team. In April she was awarded as one of the best athletes in Prague. In May she was selected for the European Championships in Budapest, competing with clubs she took 23rd place.

She was included in the national junior group in 2025. Debuting at the Miss Valentine Grand Prix, they were 4th overall. In May the group took part in the European Cup in Burgas, winning an historical bronze medal with 10 clubs. A month later she with her teammates competed at the European Championships in Tallinn, being 12th with 5 hoops and 10th with 10 clubs. She then competed, along Anna Dalecká, Tereza Kopecká, Alexandra Marešová, Adéla Mikešková and Nathalie Oulehlová, at the 3rd Junior World Championships in Sofia, being 15th in the All-Around, 19th with 5 hoops, 16th with 10 clubs and 26th in teams.

== Achievements ==
She was member of the first group of Czech rhythmic gymnasts to win a medal in a competition sanctioned by World Gymnastics since Czech Republic's independence.
