= Anna Dalecká =

Czech rhythmic gymnast

- Nickname: Anička
- Born: 27 November 2010 (age 15) Prague, Czech Republic

Gymnastics career
- Discipline: Rhythmic gymnastics
- Country represented: Czech Republic (2025–present)
- Club: TJ Bohemians Praha
- Head coaches: Yuliana Lohachová, Petra Skálová
Medal record
Representing Czech Republic
Rhythmic Gymnastics
European Cup
Bronze medal – third place	2025 Burgas	10 Clubs

Anna Dalecká (born 27 November 2010) is a Czech rhythmic gymnast. She represents the Czech Republic in international competitions.

== Career ==
=== Junior ===
Dalecká was included in the national junior group in 2025. Debuting at the Miss Valentine Grand Prix, they were 4th overall. In May the group took part in the European Cup in Burgas, winning an historical bronze medal with 10 clubs. A month later she with her teammates competed at the European Championships in Tallinn, being 12th with 5 hoops and 10th with 10 clubs. She then competed, along Johana Babištová, Tereza Kopecká, Alexandra Marešová, Adéla Mikešková and Nathalie Oulehlová, at the 3rd Junior World Championships in Sofia, being 15th in the All-Around, 19th with 5 hoops, 16th with 10 clubs and 26th in teams.

=== Senior ===
She became age eligible for senior competitions in 2026, entering the national group.

== Achievements ==
She was member of the first group of Czech rhythmic gymnasts to win a medal in a competition sanctioned by World Gymnastics since the Czech Republic's independence.
