= Kamila Grigorenko =

Estonian rhythmic gymnast

- Born: 12 February 2008 (age 18) Tallinn, Estonia

Gymnastics career
- Discipline: Rhythmic gymnastics
- Country represented: Estonia (2021-2025)
- Head coaches: Julia Tjomuskina, Irina Stadnik, Natalja Ratsejeva
- Retired: yes
Medal record
Women's rhythmic gymnastics
Representing Estonia
European Cup
Silver medal – second place	2025 Baku	5 Ribbons

Kamila Grigorenko (born 12 February 2008) is a retired Estonian rhythmic gymnast. She represents her country in international competitions as a member of the senior group.

== Career ==
=== Junior ===
In 2023 Grigorenko entered the Estonian junior group. In May she was selected for the European Championships in Baku, being 13th in the All-Around. 2nd editions of the Junior World Championships in Cluj-Napoca, along Elys Kretelle Kukk, Nika Oborskaja, Polina Tubaleva and Meibel Kudak, she took 8th place in the All-Around, 7th with 5 balls and 11th with 5 ropes.

=== Senior ===
In 2025, with the start of a new Olympic cycle, she integrated the new Estonian senior group composed by her, Ksenja Ozigina (the only remaining gymnast from the previous group), Elys Kretelle Kukk, Nika Oborskaja, Polina Tubaleva and Johanna Simone Pertens. In April the group won two gold medals at the Grand Prix in Thiais. In early May they competed at the European Cup stage in Baku, winning silver in the All-Around and with 5 ribbons. In June, Kamila and her group competed at the 2025 European Championships in Tallinn, Estonia. They took 4th place in all-around and 3 balls + 2 hoops, and finished 5th in 5 ribbons.

She announced her retirement from the sport in June, via her Instagram profile, after she and Nika Oborskaja were replaced with Valeria Valasevits and Ester Kreitsman.
