= Elys Kretelle Kukk =

Estonian rhythmic gymnast (born 2009)

- Born: 26 January 2009 (age 17)

Gymnastics career
- Discipline: Rhythmic gymnastics
- Country represented: Estonia (2023-present)
Medal record
Women's rhythmic gymnastics
Representing Estonia
European Cup
Silver medal – second place	2025 Baku	5 Ribbons

Elys Kretelle Kukk (born 26 January 2009) is an Estonian rhythmic gymnast. She represents her country in international competitions as a member of the senior group.

== Career ==
=== Junior ===
In July 2023 Kukk was selected for the 2nd editions of the Junior World Championships in Cluj-Napoca as part of the national group. There, along Kamila Grigorenko, Nika Oborskaja, Polina Tubaleva and Meibel Kudak, she took 8th place in the All-Around, 7th with 5 balls and 11th with 5 ropes.

In 2024 she competed with ribbon at the European Championships in Budapest, being 5th in the final.

=== Senior ===
In 2025, with the start of a new Olympic cycle, she integrated the new Estonian senior group composed by her, Ksenja Ozigina (the only remaining gymnast from the previous group), Kamila Grigorenko, Nika Oborskaja, Polina Tubaleva and Johanna Simone Pertens. In April the group won two gold medals at the Grand Prix in Thiais. In early May they competed at the European Cup stage in Baku, winning silver with 5 ribbons. In June, Elis and her group competed at the 2025 European Championships in Tallinn, Estonia. They took 4th place in all-around and 3 balls + 2 hoops, and finished 5th in 5 ribbons. In August, she competed at the 2025 World Championships in Rio de Janeiro, Brazil, alongside Ester Kreitsman, Ksenja Ozigina, Johanna Simone Pertens, Polina Tubaleva and Valeria Valasevits. They were 12th in all-around and did not advance into apparatus finals.

In February 2026 she returned to the individual modality and debuted at the Miss Valentine tournament in Tartu. In April, she took 4th place in all-around at Estonian National Championships. She also won gold in hoop, silver in ball and bronze in clubs final.
