= Anette Vaher =

Estonian rhythmic gymnast (born 2007)

- Born: 15 September 2007 (age 18) Tallinn, Estonia

Gymnastics career
- Discipline: Rhythmic gymnastics
- Country represented: Estonia (2020–present)
- Club: Võimlemisklubi Elegance
- Head coach: Irina Stadnik
- Assistant coach: Natalja Ratšejeva

Anette Vaher (born 15 September 2007) is an Estonian individual rhythmic gymnast. On the national level, she is the 2024 Estonian all-around champion.

== Career ==
=== Junior ===
Anette was selected to represent Estonia at the 2020 Junior European Championships in Kyiv, Ukraine. She qualified to ribbon final, where she finished on 8th place. Together with junior Erika Dokutsajeva and senior group they took 5th place in team competition.

In 2021, she was part of junior group together with Kamila Grigorenko, Ester Kreitsman, Ksenja Ozigina, Anzhelika Prisjaznjuk and Victoria Puusepp. In June, they competed at the 2021 Junior European Championships in Varna, Bulgaria and took 10th place in group all-around. They also qualified to 5 balls finals and took 6th place.

In 2022, Anette switched back to individual. Together with Ester Kreitsman she represented Estonia at the 2022 Junior European Championships in Tel Aviv, Israel. They took 10th place in team competition.

=== Senior ===
In 2024, she won gold medal in the all-around at the Estonian National championships. She also won gold hoop, silver in ball and clubs finals and bronze in ribbon finals. She represented Estonia at the 2024 European Championships in Budapest, Hungary, and took 23rd place in all-around final.

Anette started her 2025 season in February in front of home crowd at Miss Valentine. She took 7th place in all-around and qualified to three apparatus finals - finishing 7th in ball,5th in clubs and 8th in ribbon final. In March, she competed at Aphrodite Cup in Athens, Greece and took 11th place in all-around and qualified to two apparatus final. She won silver medal in hoop and finished 8th in clubs final. On April 4-6, she competed at World Cup Sofia and ended on 23rd place in all-around. Her best results were with ribbon (10th place) and hoop (13th place). She did not advance into any apparatus finals. In April, she won silver medal in the all-around at the Estonian National championships.

In June, she was selected to represent Estonia at the 2025 European Championships in her hometown Tallinn. She took 25th place in all-around qualifications but qualified to all-around final (through a host spot), where she finished on 22nd place. In August, she competed at the 2025 World Championships in Rio de Janeiro, Brazil, alongside senior group. She took 29th place in all-around qualifications, which was 4th best result for Estonia.

== Routine music information ==
Year	Apparatus	Music title
2025	Hoop	Main Title (The Flight Attendant) by Blake Neely
2025	Ball	Smells Like Teen Spirit by Tommee Profitt, Fleurie
2025	Clubs	What a Wonderful World by 2WEI, Ali Christenhusz, Edda Hayes
2025	Ribbon	
2024	Hoop	Maybe I Maybe You by Scorpions
2024	Ball	Индиго by Дана Соколова
2024	Clubs	What a Wonderful World (Louis Armstrong cover) by 2WEI, Ali Christenhusz, Edda Hayes
2024	Ribbon	Under Lock and Key by Audiomachine
