= Polina Tubaleva =

Estonian rhythmic gymnast (born 2009)

- Born: 5 September 2009 (age 17)

Gymnastics career
- Discipline: Rhythmic gymnastics
- Country represented: Estonia (2023-present)
- Head coaches: Jelena Agafontseva, Julia Tjomuskina, Irina Stadnik, Natalja Ratsejeva
Medal record
Women's rhythmic gymnastics
Representing Estonia
European Cup
Silver medal – second place	2025 Baku	5 Ribbons

Polina Tubaleva (born 5 September 2009) is an Estonian rhythmic gymnast. She represents her country in international competitions as a member of the senior group.

== Career ==
=== Junior ===
In July 2023 Tubaleva was selected for the 2nd edition of the Junior World Championships in Cluj-Napoca, Romania, as part of the national group. There, along Elys Kretelle Kukk, Nika Oborskaja, Kamila Grigorenko and Meibel Kudak, she took 8th place in the All-Around, 7th with 5 balls and 11th with 5 ropes.

=== Senior ===
In 2025, with the start of a new Olympic cycle, she integrated the new Estonian senior group composed by her, Ksenja Ozigina (the only remaining gymnast from the previous group), Elys Kretelle Kukk, Nika Oborskaja, Kamila Grigorenko and Johanna Simone Pertens. In April the group won two gold medals at the Grand Prix in Thiais. In early May they competed at the European Cup stage in Baku, winning silver in the All-Around and with 5 ribbons. In June, Polina and her group competed at the 2025 European Championships in Tallinn, Estonia. They took 4th place in all-around and 3 balls + 2 hoops, and finished 5th in 5 ribbons. In August, she competed at the 2025 World Championships in Rio de Janeiro, Brazil, alongside Ester Kreitsman, Ksenja Ozigina, Johanna Simone Pertens, Elys Kretelle Kukk and Valeria Valasevits. They were 12th in all-around and did not advance into apparatus finals.
