= Mónica de Juana =

Spanish rhythmic gymnast

- Born: January 14, 2011 (age 15) Madrid, Spain

Gymnastics career
- Discipline: Rhythmic gymnastics
- Country represented: Spain; (2024-present)
- Club: EP Hortaleza
- Head coach: Eva Jiménez
- Former coach: Carolina Malchair
Medal record
Rhythmic Gymnastics
Representing Spain
Junior European Championships
Silver medal – second place	2025 Tallinn	Group All-around

Mónica de Juana (born 14 January 2011) is a Spanish rhythmic gymnast. She represents Spain in international competitions.

== Career ==
de Juana took up the sport at the EP Hortaleza club. In 2023 she was called up for a training stage to select young gymnast to join the national team. Then, in late 2024 it was announced she was selected to integrate the new Spanish junior group under the guidance of Carolina Malchair and Beatriz Brito.

=== Junior ===
In 2025 the group debuted their routines in a various exhibitions. In May they won gold in both event finals at the Pharaoh’s Cup in Cairo. At the Gdynia international tournament they won gold with 5 hoops, as well as bronze in the All-Around and with 10 clubs. In June she competed with the group at the European Championships in Tallinn, being 4th with 5 hoops, 6th with 5 clubs and winning silver behind Ukraine in the All-Around. Later in the month she participated in the 3rd Junior World Championships in Sofia along Claudia Mariño, Cynthia Ortega, Aurica Tarleva, Noa Esplugues and Paula Donoso. In Bulgaria the group was 5th in the All-Around, 4th with 10 clubs, 5th with 5 hoops and 11th in teams (with individuals Amira Jamghili, Marta Pérez and Naira Martínez). Between July and September she was confirmed into the national team, integrating Madrid's high performance center.

Switching back to the individual modality she took part in a control training in January 2026. In March she participated into the Torneo Andalucía Cup, winning silver overall and with clubs as well as bronze with hoop. A month later she performed with hoop and clubs at the Sofia Cup, winning bronze in teams along Naira Martínez. She was then selected for the European Championships in Varna, being 9th in teams, with Claudia Marino and Naira Martinez, and 7th with hoop.

=== Senior ===
In September 2026 it was announced that de Juana was integrated into the rooster of the Spanish senior group for the 2027 when she will become a senior.
