= Johanna Simone Pertens =

Estonian rhythmic gymnast (born 2009)

Johanna Pertens
- Full name: Johanna Simone Pertens
- Born: 8 May 2009 (age 17) Tallinn, Estonia

Gymnastics career
- Discipline: Rhythmic gymnastics
- Country represented: Estonia (2025-present)
- Head coaches: Julia Tjomuskina, Irina Stadnik, Natalja Ratsejeva
Medal record
Women's rhythmic gymnastics
Representing Estonia
European Cup
Silver medal – second place	2025 Baku	5 Ribbons

Johanna Simone Pertens (born 8 May 2009) is an Estonian rhythmic gymnast. She represents her country in international competitions as a member of the senior group.

== Career ==
In 2022 Pertens competed in the German club championship with SV Dallgow.

In 2025, with the start of a new Olympic cycle, she integrated the new Estonian senior group composed by her, Ksenja Ozigina (the only remaining gymnast from the previous group), Elys Kretelle Kukk, Nika Oborskaja, Polina Tubaleva and Kamila Grigorenko. In April the group won two gold medals at the Grand Prix in Thiais. In early May they competed at the European Cup stage in Baku, winning silver with 5 ribbons. In June, Johanna Simone and her group competed at the 2025 European Championships in Tallinn, Estonia. They took 4th place in all-around and 3 balls + 2 hoops, and finished 5th in 5 ribbons. In August, she competed at the 2025 World Championships in Rio de Janeiro, Brazil, alongside Ester Kreitsman, Ksenja Ozigina, Elys Kretelle Kukk, Polina Tubaleva and Valeria Valasevits. They were 12th in all-around and did not advance into apparatus finals.

In 2026, she switched to individual modality. In April, she won bronze medal in all-around at Estonian National Championships. She also won silver in hoop and bronze in ball final.
