= Elisa Maria Comignani =

Italian rhythmic gymnast (born 2010)

- Born: 1 February 2010 (age 16) Pescara, Italy

Gymnastics career
- Discipline: Rhythmic gymnastics
- Country represented: Italy (2024-)
- Club: Armonia d'Abruzzo
- Head coach: Germana Germani
Medal record
Representing Italy
Group Rhythmic Gymnastics
European Cup
Silver medal – second place	2025 Baku	10 Clubs
Junior World Championships
Silver medal – second place	2025 Sofia	10 Clubs
Bronze medal – third place	2025 Sofia	5 Hoops
Junior European Championships
Gold medal – first place	2025 Tallinn	5 Hoops
Bronze medal – third place	2025 Tallinn	Group All-around

Elisa Maria Comignani (born 1 February 2010) is an Italian rhythmic gymnast. She represents Italy in international competitions.

== Biography ==
In 2019 Comignani took silver as part of Armonia d'Abruzzo (along Beatrice Di Nunzio and Ludovica Palermo) among gymnasts born in 2010 at the national gold championships. In December of the same year she won gold overall and in free hands at the national pre junior championships.

In December 2020 she took bronze, behind Michelle Greganti and Carol Michelotti, at the Italian pre juniors championships. In 2021 she won with Ginevra Giacco, Carol Michelotti, Ludovica Palermo and Beatrice Di Nunzio, at the national gold group championships.

In March 2024 she took two silvers in the second category of the Italian club championships along Melissa De Matteis, Asia Karol Piscopiello and Chiara Rizzo for Doria Gym Taviano. In September she was selected for the new national junior group and moved to Settimo Torinese.

In May the group made its debut at the European Cup in Baku, being 4th in the All-Around and with 5 hoops, winning silver with 10 clubs. In June she competed at the European Championships in Tallinn, winning gold with 5 hoops and bronze in the All-Around. In June she was selected for the 3rd Junior World Championships in Sofia along Flavia Cassano, Chiara Cortese, Virginia Galeazzi, Ginevra Pascarella and Elisabetta Valdifiori. There they were 5th in teams, 4th in the All-Around, won silver with 10 clubs and bronze, tied with Estonia, with 5 hoops. In late July she was a guest with her group mates at the Ginnastica in Festa in Rimini.
