= Anastasiia Nikolenko =

Ukrainian rhythmic gymnast (born 2011)

- Анастасія Николенко
- Born: 19 May 2011 (age 15) Kyiv, Ukraine

Gymnastics career
- Discipline: Rhythmic gymnastics
- Country represented: Ukraine (2025–)
- Club: Deriugins School
- Head coach: Irina Deriugina
- Choreographer: Iryna Blokhina
Medal record
Rhythmic Gymnastics
Representing Ukraine
Junior World Championships
Gold medal – first place	2025 Sofia	10 Clubs
Bronze medal – third place	2025 Sofia	Group All-around
Junior European Championships
Gold medal – first place	2025 Tallinn	Group All-Around
Gold medal – first place	2025 Tallinn	10 Clubs
European Cup
Silver medal – second place	2025 Baku	Junior Group All-Around

Anastasiia Nikolenko (Ukrainian: Анастасія Николенко; born 19 May 2011) is a Ukrainian rhythmic gymnast. She represents Ukraine in international competitions.

== Biography ==
Nikolenko became a junior in 2025 and was incorporated into the Ukrainian national junior group. In May, she and her teammates competed in the European Cup in Baku, winning silver in the All-Around. In June she took part in the European Championships in Tallinn, where the group won gold in the All-Around and with 5 pairs of clubs. It was later revealed she had been selected for the Junior World Championships in Sofia along Ahata Bilenko, Marharyta Melnyk, Taisiia Redka, Oleksandra Nikol Samoukina and Kateryna Shershen. There they took 6th place with 5 hoops, won the bronze medal in the All-Around and gold in the 10 clubs final.
