= Ksenja Ozigina =

Estonian rhythmic gymnast (born 2007)

- Born: 7 May 2007 (age 19) Tallinn, Estonia

Gymnastics career
- Discipline: Rhythmic gymnastics
- Country represented: Estonia (2023-present)
- Head coaches: Julia Tjomuskina, Irina Stadnik, Natalja Ratsejeva
Medal record
Women's rhythmic gymnastics
Representing Estonia
European Cup
Silver medal – second place	2025 Baku	5 Ribbons

Ksenja Ozigina (born 7 May 2007) is an Estonian rhythmic gymnast. She represents her country in international competitions as a member of the senior group.

== Career ==
In 2023 Ozigina was selected for the World Championships in Valencia along Maria Muravjova, Kiara Oja, Victoria Puusepp and Vanessa Vulf, taking 24th in the All-Around, 17th with 5 hoops and 24th with 3 ribbons & 2 balls.

In 2025, with the start of a new Olympic cycle, she integrated the new Estonian senior group composed by her (the only remaining gymnast from the previous group), Kamila Grigorenko, Elys Kretelle Kukk, Nika Oborskaja, Polina Tubaleva and Johanna Simone Pertens. In April the group won two gold medals at the Grand Prix in Thiais. In early May they competed at the European Cup stage in Baku, winning silver in the All-Around and with 5 ribbons. In June, Ksenja and her group competed at the 2025 European Championships in Tallinn, Estonia. They took 4th place in all-around and 3 balls + 2 hoops, and finished 5th in 5 ribbons. In August, she competed at the 2025 World Championships in Rio de Janeiro, Brazil, alongside Ester Kreitsman, Polina Tubaleva, Johanna Simone Pertens, Elys Kretelle Kukk and Valeria Valasevits. They were 12th in all-around and did not advance into apparatus finals.
