= Neele Arndt =

German rhythmic gymnast (born 2005)

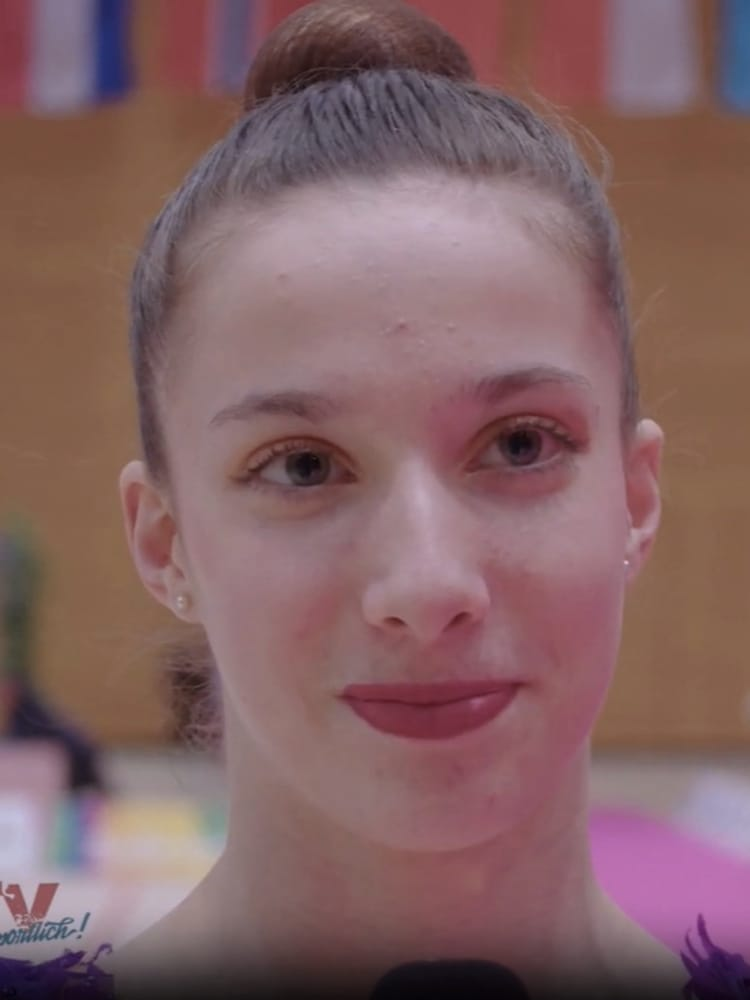
- Born: 5 September 2005 (age 21) Berlin

Gymnastics career
- Discipline: Rhythmic gymnastics
- Country represented: Germany; (2022-)
- Club: Berliner TSC
- Head coach: Camilla Pfeffer
- Assistant coach: Camilla Patriarca
- Former coach: Angela Lepekha
- Choreographer: Gocha Budagashvili
Medal record
Rhythmic Gymnastics
Representing Germany
European Championships
Bronze medal – third place	2025 Tallinn	3 Balls + 2 Hoops

Neele Arndt (born 5 September 2005) is a German rhythmic gymnast. She represents Germany as part of the senior group.

== Biography ==
Arndt debuted nationally in 2019, when she won silver at the German Championships, among gymnasts born in 2005, behind Sandy Kruse.

In 2022 she took part in the qualifications for the European Championships, being 6th in the first and 5th in the second competition. In June she was 7th in the All-Around, 5th with hoop, 7th with ball and 6th with ribbon at nationals.

In March 2023 she competed at the Berlin Masters, being 4th in the gold category. At the German Championships she was 6th overall, 5th with ball, 7th with hoop, 7th with clubs and 7th with ribbon. In November she helped her club, Berliner TSC, win bronze in the club championships.

In 2025 she was called up to join the national senior group, debuting at the Gymnastik International, winning gold in the All-Around and with 5 ribbons. At the World Cup in Baku where Germany was 10th in the All-Around, 12th with 5 ribbon and 7th with 3 balls & 2 hoops. A week later, in Tashkent, they took 4th place overall, 5th with 5 ribbons and 7th in the mixed event. She was then selected for the European Championships in Tallinn, there the group was 10th in the All-Around and won an historical bronze medal, the first ever in the competition for a German group, with 3 balls & 2 hoops.
