= Valeria Valasevits =

Estonian rhythmic gymnast (born 2008)

- Born: 26 May 2008 (age 18) Tartu

Gymnastics career
- Discipline: Rhythmic gymnastics
- Country represented: Estonia; (2024-present)
- Head coaches: Julia Tjomuskina, Irina Stadnik, Natalja Ratsejeva

Valeria Valasevits (born 26 May 2008) is an Estonian rhythmic gymnast. She represents Estonia in international competitions as a member of the senior group.

== Biography ==
Valasevits became age eligible for senior competitions in 2024, debuting at the Miss Valentine tournament being 9th overall, 7th with ball and 6th with ribbon. Weeks later she was 7th in the All-Around at the Tallinn Open. At the Estonian Championships she took silver behind Anette Vaher and in front of Melany Keler. Being selected for the European Championships in Budapest where she was 34th in the All-Around, 28th with hoop, 39th with ball, 38th with clubs and 28th with ribbon.

In 2025 she participated in the Miss Valentine Grand Prix, finishing 4th with hoop, 7th with clubs and 5th with ribbon. On April 4-6 she competed at World Cup Sofia, being 30th in the All-Around, 28th with hoop, 30th with ball, 54th with clubs and 22nd with ribbon. She went on to win gold at nationals in front of Vaher and Elina Safronova, thus earning a spot for the European Championships, becoming national champion also with clubs and ribbon. At the European Cup in Baku she was eliminated in the last 16 cross battle with hoop against Sofia Raffaeli. In Tallinn she was 28th overall, 60th with hoop, 33rd with ball, 17th with clubs and 21st with ribbon. In late July it was announced she switched to the group modality. She made her debut with the group competing at the World Cup in Cluj-Napoca, being 7th in the All-Around and 6th with 5 ribbons. In August she was selected for the World Championships in Rio de Janeiro along Ester Kreitsman, Elys Kretelle Kukk, Ksenja Ozigina, Johanna Simone Pertens and Polina Tubaleva, taking 12th place in the All-Around, 10th with 5 ribbons and 19th with 3 balls & 2 hoops.
