= Taisiia Redka =

Ukrainian rhythmic gymnast (born 2008)

- Таисия Редька
- Born: 15 August 2010 (age 16) Dnipropetrovsk Oblast, Ukraine

Gymnastics career
- Discipline: Rhythmic gymnastics
- Country represented: Ukraine; (2024–)
- Training location: Kyiv, Ukraine
- Club: Deriugins School
- Head coach: Irina Deriugina
- Choreographer: Iryna Blokhina
Medal record
Rhythmic Gymnastics
Representing Ukraine
Event	1st	2nd	3rd
FIG World Cup	0	0	1
Total	0	0	1
Junior World Championships
Gold medal – first place	2025 Sofia	10 Clubs
Bronze medal – third place	2025 Sofia	Group All-around
Junior European Championships
Gold medal – first place	2025 Tallinn	Group All-Around
Gold medal – first place	2025 Tallinn	10 Clubs
European Cup
Silver medal – second place	2025 Baku	Junior Group All-Around
Gymnasiade
Bronze medal – third place	Bahrain 2024	Clubs

Taisiia Redka (Ukrainian: Таисия Редька; born 15 August 2010) is a Ukrainian group rhythmic gymnast. She represents Ukraine in international competitions.

== Career ==
=== Junior ===
In May 2024, Redka was selected to represent Ukraine at the European Championships in Budapest, finishing in 11th place in team competition (along Kseniia Solomon, Marharyta Chulinina and Dariia Oveichyk), and 6th in the hoop final. In July, she won bronze medal in all-around at Ukrainian National Championships. In September she won gold in the junior All-Around and silver in teams with teammates Khrystyna Pohranychna and Taisiia Onofriichuk at the AEON Cup in Japan. In October of the same year she won bronze with clubs and the Gymnasiade in Bahrain behind Wang Qi and Boglarka Barkóczi.

In 2025, she was incorporated into the Ukrainian national junior group. In May, she and her teammates Ahata Bilenko, Anastasiia Nikolenko, Oleksandra Nikol Samoukina, Kateryna Shershen and Marharyta Melnyk, competed in the European Cup in Baku, winning silver in the All-Around. In June she took part in the European Championships in Tallinn, where the group won gold in the All-Around and with 5 pairs of clubs. It was later revealed she had been selected for the Junior World Championships in Sofia. She and her group won bronze medal in all-around and gold in 10 clubs final. They took 6th place in 5 hoop final.

=== Senior ===
In 2026, she integrated to senior group. In May, she competed at the 2026 European Championships in Varna, Bulgaria, alongside Oleksandra Yushchak, Valeriia Peremeta, Kira Shyrykina, Diana Baieva and Polina Horodnycha. They took 7th place in all-around, 9th place in team competition with Polina Karika and Taisiia Onofriichuk, and 4th place in mixed apparatus final. In June, they took 14th place in all-around at the World Challenge Cup Cluj-Napoca, after big mistakes in both routines. In July, they ended on 6th place in all-around at Milan World Cup and won bronze medal in 3 Hoops + 4 Clubs final.
