= Flavia Cassano =

Italian rhythmic gymnast (born 2011)

- Full name: Flavia Cassano
- Born: 27 July 2011 (age 15) Bari, Italy

Gymnastics career
- Discipline: Rhythmic gymnastics
- Country represented: Italy; (2025-)
- Club: Ginnastica Ritmica Iris
- Head coaches: Maddalena Carrieri, Lucia Andriani
- Former coaches: Tiziana Colognese, Elisa Vaccaro
Medal record
Representing Italy
Rhythmic gymnastics
European Cup
Silver medal – second place	2025 Baku	10 Clubs
Junior World Championships
Silver medal – second place	2025 Sofia	10 Clubs
Junior European Championships
Bronze medal – third place	2025 Tallinn	Group All-around
Bronze medal – third place	2026 Varna	Hoop

Flavia Cassano (born 27 July 2011) is an Italian rhythmic gymnast. She represents Italy in international competitions.

== Career ==
She started training in club Ginnastica Ritmica Iris in Puglia, Italy.

=== Junior ===
She first appeared in the national team in 2025, as a member of the Italian junior group which competed at the 2025 Rhythmic Gymnastics European Cup in Baku winning the silver medal with 10 clubs. At the 2025 European Junior Championships in Tallinn, they won bronze medal in group All-around. Flavia was included in 10 clubs routine and a reserve gymnast for 5 hoops. In June she was selected to represent Italy at the 2025 Junior World Championships in Sofia, Bulgaria, alongside Chiara Cortese, Elisa Maria Comignani, Virginia Galeazzi, Ginevra Pascarella and Elisabetta Valdifiori. There they were 5th in team competition, 4th in the All-Around, and won silver medal with 10 clubs. After that, Cassano switched to the individual modality, and became the Italian National Gold Champion in the Junior 1 category in Ancona, Italy.

In 2026, Flavia started the season competing at Miss Valentine International tournament and won silver medal in team competition. She took 4th place in both ball and clubs finals. In April, she won silver medal in hoop final behind Siyana Alekova at International tournament Sofia Cup. She won silver medal at the Italian National Gold Championships in the Junior 2 category in Chieti, Italy. In May, Flavia, Elodie Godioz and Veronica Zappaterreni won gold medal in team competition at International tournament Gdynia Rhythmic Stars in Poland. She also won bronze medals in hoop and clubs finals. She was selected to represent Italy alongside Elodie Godioz, Ludovica Ajello and Veronica Zappaterreni at 2026 European Championships in Varna, Bulgaria. They took 8th place in team competition. Flavia won bronze medal in hoop final. In October, she competed at International tournament Aura Cup in Zagreb. She took 7th place in all-around competition. She took 4th place in hoop and 5th place in ball and clubs finals.
