= Kateryna Shershen =

Ukrainian rhythmic gymnast (born 2010)

- Катерина Шершень
- Born: 7 December 2010 (age 15) Kyiv, Ukraine

Gymnastics career
- Discipline: Rhythmic gymnastics
- Country represented: Ukraine (2024–)
- Club: Deriugins School
- Head coach: Irina Deriugina
- Choreographer: Iryna Blokhina
Medal record
Rhythmic Gymnastics
Representing Ukraine
Junior World Championships
Gold medal – first place	2025 Sofia	10 Clubs
Bronze medal – third place	2025 Sofia	Group All-around
Junior European Championships
Gold medal – first place	2025 Tallinn	Group All-Around
Gold medal – first place	2025 Tallinn	10 Clubs
European Cup
Silver medal – second place	2025 Baku	Junior Group All-Around
Gymnasiades
Gold medal – first place	Bahrain 2024	5 Hoops
Silver medal – second place	Bahrain 2024	All-around
Silver medal – second place	Bahrain 2024	10 Clubs

Kateryna Shershen (Ukrainian: Катерина Шершень; born 7 December 2010) is a Ukrainian rhythmic gymnast. She represents Ukraine in international competitions.

== Biography ==
In 2024 Shershen was incorporated into the Ukrainian national junior group, along Khrystyna Shkolnykova, Oleksandra Nikol Samoukina, Svitlana Apatkina and Anna Shcherbukha, for the Gymnasiade in Bahrain, winning gold with 5 hoops and silver in the All-Around and with 10 clubs.

In May 2025 she and her teammates competed in the European Cup in Baku, winning silver in the All-Around. In June she took part in the European Championships in Tallinn, where the group won gold in the All-Around and with 5 pairs of clubs. It was later revealed she had been selected for the Junior World Championships in Sofia along Ahata Bilenko, Anastasiia Nikolenko, Taisiia Redka, Oleksandra Nikol Samoukina and Marharyta Melnyk. There they took 6th place with 5 hoops, won the bronze medal in the All-Around and gold in the 10 clubs final.
