= Sofia Hemmings =

Australian rhythmic gymnast

- Born: 21 April 2010 (age 16) North Adelaide, Australia

Gymnastics career
- Discipline: Rhythmic gymnastics
- Country represented: Australia; (2024-present)
- Club: Aspire Gymnastics Academy
- Head coach: Anya Tabolkina
Medal record
Rhythmic Gymnastics
Representing Australia
Oceanian Championships
Silver medal – second place	2026 Tshwane	All-Around

Sofia Hemmings (born 21 April 2010) is an Australian rhythmic gymnast. She represents Australia in international competitions.

== Career ==
=== Junior ===
In 2024 Hemmings was the national junior champion. In June 2025 she was selected for the 3rd Junior World Championships in Sofia, competing with ball she was 52nd with the apparatus and 23rd in teams along Alicia Tan, Remi Meyer-Rochow and the national junior group. The following month she took part in the Australian Championships, winning bronze in the All-Around, behind Tan and Zoe Faber, winning silver and bronze medals in the event finals.

=== Senior ===
Hemmings became age eligible for senior competitions in 2026, in February she was third at the first national test event. In March she competed at the World Cup in Sofia, being 50th in the All-Around, 46th with hoop, 53rd with ball, 75th with clubs and 41st with ribbon. Later in the month she took 11th place overall at the Sofia International Tournament. In late April she won silver, behind Tan, at the Oceanian Championships. In August she was selected for the World Championships in Frankfurt, being 50th in the All-Around.
