= Break of Reality =

American band

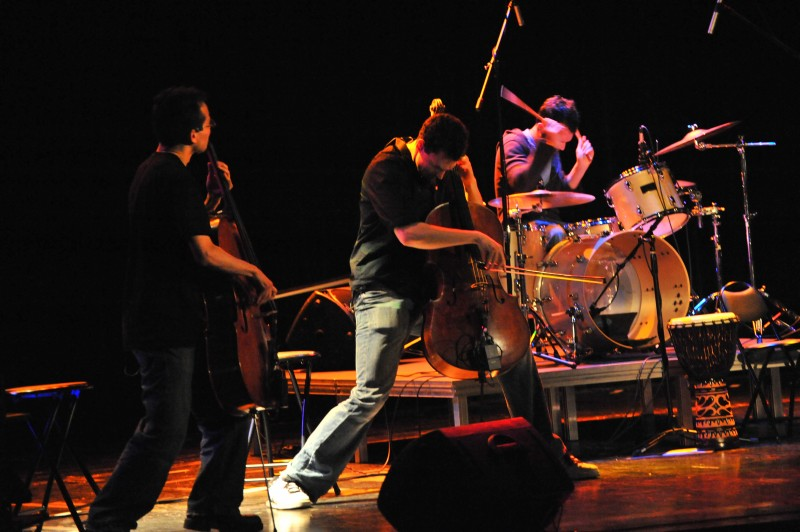

Background information
- Origin: Rochester, New York
- Genres: Cello rock, Cinematic Rock, chamber music
- Years active: 2003–present
- Labels: Independent
- Members: Patrick Laird; Ivan Trevino; Laura Metcalf; Ben Capps; Meta Weiss
- Past members: Philip Borter; Erin Keesecker; Jeff Hood; Andrew Janss; Brook Speltz; Tavi Ungerleider; Cecily Parnas
- Website: breakofreality.com

Break of Reality (BoR) is an American cello rock band consisting of three cellists and a percussionist. The group is associated with the terms "cinematic rock", "cello rock", and "indie classical". Break of Reality's current members are Patrick Laird, Ivan Trevino, Laura Metcalf, and Adrian Daurov. The band's sound consists of many musical influences, such as rock, classical, and indie rock.

== History ==
The group was formed while the original members were freshmen at the Eastman School of Music in Rochester, NY. At the time of its formation, the band consisted of four cellists. The band gave their first formal concert in a small classical venue at Eastman, where they received complaints for being too loud.

In 2006, the band released "The Sound Between", a double disc album featuring both electric and acoustic songs. After all graduating from Eastman, the group collectively moved to NYC in 2007, where they developed a fan base through busking in Central Park. The band split a year later, leaving Laird and Trevino as the remaining members.

In 2008, Laird and Trevino began composing and recording music together, much of which is featured on "Spectrum of the Sky", released in May 2009. Soon after, Laird and Trevino were joined by cellists Philip Borter and Martin Torch-Ishii and began touring again. Borter was later replaced by Laura Metcalf.

The band has gained a following through Pandora Radio, where their music has 44,000 daily streams.

In 2013, the band's cover of the "Game of Thrones" TV show theme song appeared on Huffington Post and was called "the best rendition of the theme song you will ever hear".

In 2014 member Patrick Laird formed the cello and piano group Brooklyn Duo with his wife Marnie Laird.

In 2015, the band did a tour of central Asia, which included playing in Turkmenistan and four cities in Kazakhstan. The band performed at the 25 year celebration of Kazakh-American diplomatic relations in Almaty, Kazakhstan in August 2016.

=== Current ===
Break of Reality most recently released their latest album, TEN, in March 2014. The album consists of all original music.

== Current Lineup ==
- Patrick Laird – cello (2003–present)
- Laura Metcalf – cello (2009–present)
- Adrian Daurov – cello (present)
- Ivan Trevino– drums & percussion (2003–present)

== Discography ==
=== "Voiceless" ===
Released October 2004.

1. Trogdor
2. Tragic Visions
3. Time
4. Voiceless (feat. singer Marc Goldberg from More Than I)
5. Chariot to Hell
6. Muddy Peninsula
7. Awake
8. Total Freedom
9. Epic
10. The Healing
11. WSNZBZ (with hidden song)

=== "The Sound Between" ===
Released March 2006.

1. Beyond Recourse
2. Parabolic Cosmos
3. Broken
4. Sore Arms
5. Circles
6. Black Noise
7. A Blind Purpose
8. Scarred by Duty
9. Jade
10. Rise
11. Solid Ground

=== "The Sound Between" ===
Re-Released December 2006. Same disc as the earlier plus an EP with 5 "acoustic" songs: 3 celli and Djembe/African drums

EP track list

1. Circles
2. A Blind Purpose
3. Parabolic Cosmos
4. Sore Arms
5. Solid Ground

=== "Spectrum of the Sky" ===
Released May 2009.

1. The Farewell
2. The Accidental Death of Effie
3. Vintage
4. Spectrum of the Sky
5. Comfortable Silence
6. Che
7. Anodynia: I
8. Anodynia: II
9. Anodynia: III
10. Anodynia: IV

=== "Covers" ===
Covers was released in March 2012. The album is a collection of covers.

1. Bachianas Brasileiras Nº5 (Heitor Villa-Lobos)
2. Welcome Home (Coheed and Cambria)
3. I Will (Radiohead)
4. Lateralus (Tool)
5. Suite 6 "Sarabande" (Johann Sebastian Bach)
6. B.Y.O.B. (System of a Down)
7. Julie-O (Mark Summer)
8. The Medicine Wears Off (Karnivool)
9. My Curse (Killswitch Engage)
10. Crosses (José González)
11. Suite 2 "Sarabande" (Bach)
12. The Day That Never Comes (Metallica)
13. Ghosts I (Nine Inch Nails)
14. Welcome Home (Unplugged) (Coheed and Cambria)

=== "Ten" ===
Released March 25, 2014.

1. Helix 04:34
2. Storm's End 04:08
3. Star 04:40
4. Drift Apart 04:27
5. Nine Deep 06:22
6. Light the Fuse 03:47
7. Uprising 04:43
8. Levy 03:58
9. Other Worlds 04:29
10. Six 04:51

== See also ==
- Cello rock
