= Marharyta Melnyk =

Ukrainian rhythmic gymnast (born 2010)

- Маргарита Мельник
- Born: 23 October 2010 (age 15) Lutsk, Ukraine

Gymnastics career
- Discipline: Rhythmic gymnastics
- Country represented: Ukraine (since 2025)
- Training location: Kyiv
- Club: Deriugins School
- Head coach: Irina Deriugina
- Choreographer: Iryna Blokhina
Medal record
Rhythmic Gymnastics
Representing Ukraine
Junior World Championships
Gold medal – first place	2025 Sofia	10 Clubs
Bronze medal – third place	2025 Sofia	Group All-around
Junior European Championships
Gold medal – first place	2025 Tallinn	Group All-Around
Gold medal – first place	2025 Tallinn	10 Clubs
European Cup
Silver medal – second place	2025 Baku	Junior Group All-Around

Marharyta Melnyk (Ukrainian: Маргарита Мельник; born 23 October 2010) is a Ukrainian group rhythmic gymnast. She represents Ukraine in international competitions.

== Biography ==
In 2025, Melnyk became a member of the Ukrainian national junior group. In May, she and her teammates competed in the European Cup in Baku, winning silver in the all-around. In June, she took part in the European Championships in Tallinn, where the group won gold in the all-around and with 5 pairs of clubs.

She was selected for the Junior World Championships in Sofia along with her teammates Ahata Bilenko, Anastasiia Nikolenko, Taisiia Redka, Oleksandra Nikol Samoukina and Kateryna Shershen. There, they won the bronze medal in the all-around. In the finals, they won gold with 10 clubs and took 6th place with 5 hoops.
