= Dover Quartet =

American string quartet

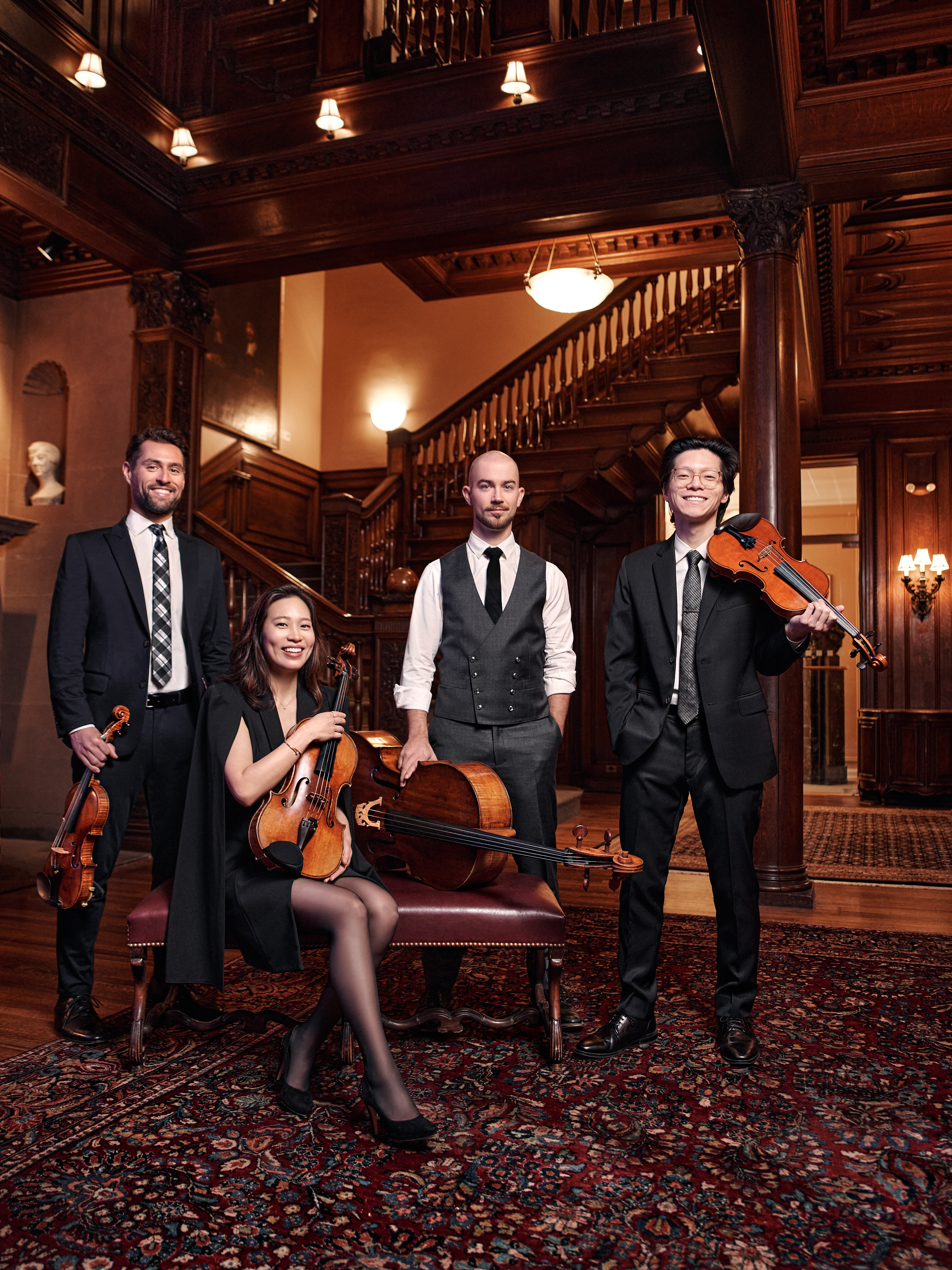
- Dover Quartet (2014)

Background information
- Origin: Philadelphia, Pennsylvania, US
- Genre: Classical Music
- Years active: 2008-present
- Labels: Cedille Records, Azica Records
- Members: Joel Link (First Violinist); Bryan Lee (Second Violinist); Julianne Lee (Violist); Camden Shaw (Cellist)
- Past members: Milena Pajaro-van de Stadt (2008-2022) Hezekiah Leung (2022-2023)
- Website: https://www.doverquartet.com/

The Dover Quartet is an American string quartet. It was formed at the Curtis Institute of Music in 2008 and its members are graduates of both the Curtis Institute of Music and the Rice University Shepherd School of Music. Its name is taken from the piece Dover Beach by Samuel Barber, who also studied at Curtis. The Dover Quartet was appointed to the faculty of the Curtis Institute of Music as the Penelope P. Watkins ensemble-in-residence in 2020. Additionally, they hold a teaching residency at the Bienen School of Music at Northwestern University.

In 2021, BBC Music Magazine named the Dover Quartet one of the greatest string quartets of the last 100 years. The quartet has been nominated for two Grammy Awards.

The Dover Quartet has collaborated with artists such as Emanuel Ax, Inon Barnaton, Ray Chen, the Escher Quartet, Edgar Meyer, Anthony McGill, the late Peter Serkin, and Roomful of Teeth. They have performed the premiere performances of works by composers such as Caroline Shaw, Mason Bates, Marc Neikrug, Steven Mackey, and Gabriella Smith.

The founding members of the quartet are violinists Joel Link and Bryan Lee, violist Milena Pajaro-van de Stadt, and cellist Camden Shaw. Violist Milena Pajaro-van de Stadt stepped down from the quartet in August 2022, and was replaced by Hezekiah Leung in a one-year appointment for the 2022-2023 season. In February 2023, the quartet announced that violist Julianne Lee would join the quartet as a full member starting in the fall of 2023. Lee has announced that she will leave the ensemble at the end of the 2024-25 season. She will continue to tour with the quartet until June 2025.

== Discography ==
The Dover Quartet has released three albums on Cedille Records: Tribute: Dover Quartet Plays Mozart, Voices of Defiance, and Beethoven Complete String Quartets, Volume 1 – The Opus 18 Quartets. Their fourth album Encores was released in 2021 in collaboration with Brooklyn Classical (also known as the popular piano and cello group Brooklyn Duo). The album was made up of 10 popular classical movements.
