= Margaux Sol =

French rhythmic gymnast

- Born: 9 April 2008 (age 18) Nogent sur Marne

Gymnastics career
- Discipline: Rhythmic gymnastics
- Country represented: France (2023-)
- Club: Arena Sport Club
- Head coach: Anna Baranova
- Assistant coach: Sara Bayón
- Choreographer: Gregory Milan
Medal record
Rhythmic Gymnastics
Representing France
Event	1st	2nd	3rd
FIG World Cup	0	0	1
Total	0	0	1
European Championships
Silver medal – second place	2025 Tallinn	5 Ribbons

Margaux Sol (born 9 April 2008) is a French rhythmic gymnast. She represents France as a member of the senior group.

== Biography ==
In February 2023 Sol was called up for a national test in Paris. In August she was aggregated to the national senior group, even she was still a junior at the time, for a control training in Thiais. The following year she took part in the Thiais Grand Prix. The she was listed as a reserve for the European Championships in Budapest.

In 2025, with the retirement of some of the members of the previous group, she became a starter making her debut at the Grand Prix in Thiais. There she won silver in the All-Around and bronze with 5 ribbons. In April the group competed in the World Cup in Sofia, being 8th overall, 10th with 5 ribbons and 8th with 3 balls & 2 hoops. Weeks later they were in Tashkent, taking 6th place in the All-Around, 6th place with 5 ribbons and 4th place in the mixed final. In May they participated in the stage in Portimão, finishing 5th with 5 ribbons, 6th with 3 balls & 2 hoops and winning bronze in the All-Around. She was then selected for the European Championships in Tallinn, where the group was 9th overall and won silver in the 5 ribbons final.
