= Chiara Cortese =

Italian rhythmic gymnast (born 2010)

- Full name: Chiara Cortese
- Born: 30 March 2010 (age 16) Turin, Italy

Gymnastics career
- Discipline: Rhythmic gymnastics
- Country represented: Italy; (2025–2026)
- Club: Eurogymnica Torino
- Head coach: Tiziana Colognese
- Assistant coach: Elisa Vaccaro
- Retired: yes
Medal record
Representing Italy
Group Rhythmic Gymnastics
European Cup
Silver medal – second place	2025 Baku	10 Clubs
Junior World Championships
Silver medal – second place	2025 Sofia	10 Clubs
Bronze medal – third place	2025 Sofia	5 Hoops
Junior European Championships
Gold medal – first place	2025 Tallinn	5 Hoops
Bronze medal – third place	2025 Tallinn	Group All-around

Chiara Cortese (born 30 March 2010) is an Italian group rhythmic gymnast.

== Career ==
In 2023, Cortese became the Italian National Gold Champion in the Junior 1 category.

She first appeared in the national team in 2025, as a member of the Italian junior group which competed at the 2025 Rhythmic Gymnastics European Cup in Baku winning the silver medal with 10 clubs and 2025 European Junior Championships in Tallinn, winning the bronze medal in group All-around and gold in 5 Hoops. In June she was selected to represent Italy at the 3rd Junior World Championships in Sofia alongside Flavia Cassano, Elisa Maria Comignani, Virginia Galeazzi, Ginevra Pascarella and Elisabetta Valdifiori. There they were 5th in teams, 4th in the All-Around, won silver with 10 clubs and bronze with 5 hoops, tied with Estonia.

She announced her retirement in 2026 due to her back issues.
