= Ester Kreitsman =

Estonian rhythmic gymnast (born 2007)

- Born: 18 October 2007 (age 18) Tallinn

Gymnastics career
- Discipline: Rhythmic gymnastics
- Country represented: Estonia (2021-present)
- Club: VK Elegance
- Head coaches: Julia Tjomuskina, Irina Stadnik, Natalja Ratsejeva

Ester Kreitsman (born 18 October 2007) is an Estonian rhythmic gymnast. She represents Estonia in international competitions as a member of the senior group.

== Biography ==
=== Junior ===
In 2021 Kreitsman was part of junior group together with Kamila Grigorenko, Anette Vaher, Ksenja Ozigina, Anzhelika Prisjaznjuk and Victoria Puusepp. In June, they competed at the 2021 Junior European Championships in Varna, Bulgaria and took 10th place in group all-around. They also qualified to 5 balls finals and took 6th place.

In 2022, Ester switched back to individual. At the Estonian Championships she won gold with hoop and ball, silver with clubs and ribbon. Together with Vaher she represented Estonia at the 2022 Junior European Championships in Tel Aviv, Israel. They took 10th place in team competition.

=== Senior ===
She became age eligible for senior competitions in 2023, debuting at the World Cup in Tashkent being 23rd overall, 23rd with hoop, 14th with ball, 32nd with clubs and 20th with ribbon. At the Estonian Championships she took bronze behind Polina Murashko and Melany Keler, as well as with ball and winning gold in the remaining event finals. In May she participated in the European Championships in Baku, being 23rd in the All-Around, 22nd with hoop, 23rd with ball, 24th with clubs and 59th with ribbon. In August she was selected for the World Championships in Valencia, finishing 49th in the All-Around, 37th with hoop, 42nd with clubs and 51st with ribbon. In January 2024 she was awarded best female gymnast in Estonia.

In April 2025 she returned to competition after a long pause due to injury, winning silver with ribbon at nationals. In late July it was announced she switched to the group modality. She made her debut with the group competing at the World Cup in Cluj-Napoca, being 7th in the All-Around and 6th with 5 ribbons. In August she was selected for the World Championships in Rio de Janeiro along Valeria Valasevits, Elys Kretelle Kukk, Ksenja Ozigina, Johanna Simone Pertens and Polina Tubaleva, taking 12th place in the All-Around, 10th with 5 ribbons and 19th with 3 balls & 2 hoops.
