= Lina Heleika =

Egyptian rhythmic gymnast

- Full name: Lina Fathy Mohamed Kamal Fathy Heleika
- Born: 6 September 2010 (age 16) Cairo, Egypt

Gymnastics career
- Discipline: Rhythmic gymnastics
- Country represented: Egypt; (2024-)
- Club: Sofia Sport Dubai
- Head coach: Olga Lobas
Medal record
Rhythmic Gymnastics
Representing Egypt
African Championships
Gold medal – first place	2026 Tshwane	Team
Gold medal – first place	2026 Tshwane	Hoop
Gold medal – first place	2026 Tshwane	Ribbon
Gold medal – first place	2026 Tshwane	Clubs
Silver medal – second place	2026 Tshwane	All-Around
Silver medal – second place	2026 Tshwane	Ball
Junior World Championships
Silver medal – second place	2025 Sofia	Ribbon
Junior African Championships
Gold medal – first place	2024 Kigali	Team
Gold medal – first place	2024 Kigali	Ribbon
Silver medal – second place	2024 Kigali	All-Around
Silver medal – second place	2024 Kigali	Hoop
Silver medal – second place	2024 Kigali	Ball
Silver medal – second place	2024 Kigali	Clubs

Lina Heleika (Arabic: لينا حليقة; born 6 September 2010) is an Egyptian rhythmic gymnast. She represents Egypt in international competitions. She is the 2025 Junior World silver medalist with ribbon.

== Personal life ==
Her mother, Dina Salem, was born in Germany, the country of origin of Lina's maternal grandfather. She is the founder of the Sofia Gymnastics Club in Dubai, where Lina's family resides.

== Career ==
In 2020, she travelled to Ukraine for International tournament Deriugina Cup, but stayed there for six months away from her family due to COVID-19 pandemic. She lived and trained with Ukrainian national team.

=== Junior ===
In 2023, she competed at Junior Mediterranean Championships in Italy and won bronze medal in team competition with Alia Ahmed.

In 2024, she competed at African Championships in Kigali, Rwanda, and won gold in team and ribbon and silver medals in all-around, hoop, ball and clubs.

In 2025, she competed at Irina Deleanu Cup, where she took 5th place with ball and 10th place with ribbon. Then the competed at Keti Cup in Tbilisi, and won gold medal in all-around in front of Barbare Kajaia. She represented Egypt at the 2025 Junior World Championships in Sofia, Bulgaria, alongside Farida Bahnas and junior group. They took 12th place in team competition. She took 17th place in ball and won silver medal in ribbon final.

=== Senior ===
In 2026, she debuted as a senior at Gymnastik International in Fellbach Schmiden, taking 7th place in all-around. In March, she made her World Cup at Sofia World Cup, placing 52nd in all-around. In April, she was 41st in all-around at Tashkent World Cup. In May she was selected for the African Championships in Tshwane, winning silver in the All-Around and gold in teams with Farida Bahnas. She also won gold medals in all apparatus finals but ball, where she won silver. In June, she took 15th place in all-around at Beijing World Challenge Cup. She also made history, by qualifying to her first World Cup apparatus final (with ribbon), where she finished 8th, being the first Egyptian rhythmic gymnast to achieve this. In July, she took 53rd place in all-around at Milan World Cup. In August, she was selected to represent Egypt alongside Farida Bahnas at the 2026 World Championships in Frankfurt, Germany. She ended on 49th place in all-around qualifications. She also represented Egypt at the 2026 Mediterranean Games in Taranto, Italy, and ended on 12th place in all-around qualifications.

== Achievements ==
- First Egyptian rhythmic gymnast to qualify for an apparatus final at a World Cup.

== Routine music information ==
Year	Apparatus	Music title
2026	Hoop	Happy Birthday by Tempo
2026	Ball	Carmen (Remix) by Michelle Minke, James Noble
2026	Clubs	Berghain by Rosalía
2026	Ribbon	Andrew Jarod Smith, BMI
2025	Hoop	
2025	Ball	Clash by Scylla & Sofiane Pamart
2025	Clubs	Childhood (Immortal Version), Immortal Megamix by Michael Jackson
2025	Ribbon	Live Die Repeat by Ghostwriter
