= Brooklyn Duo =

Classical crossover ensemble

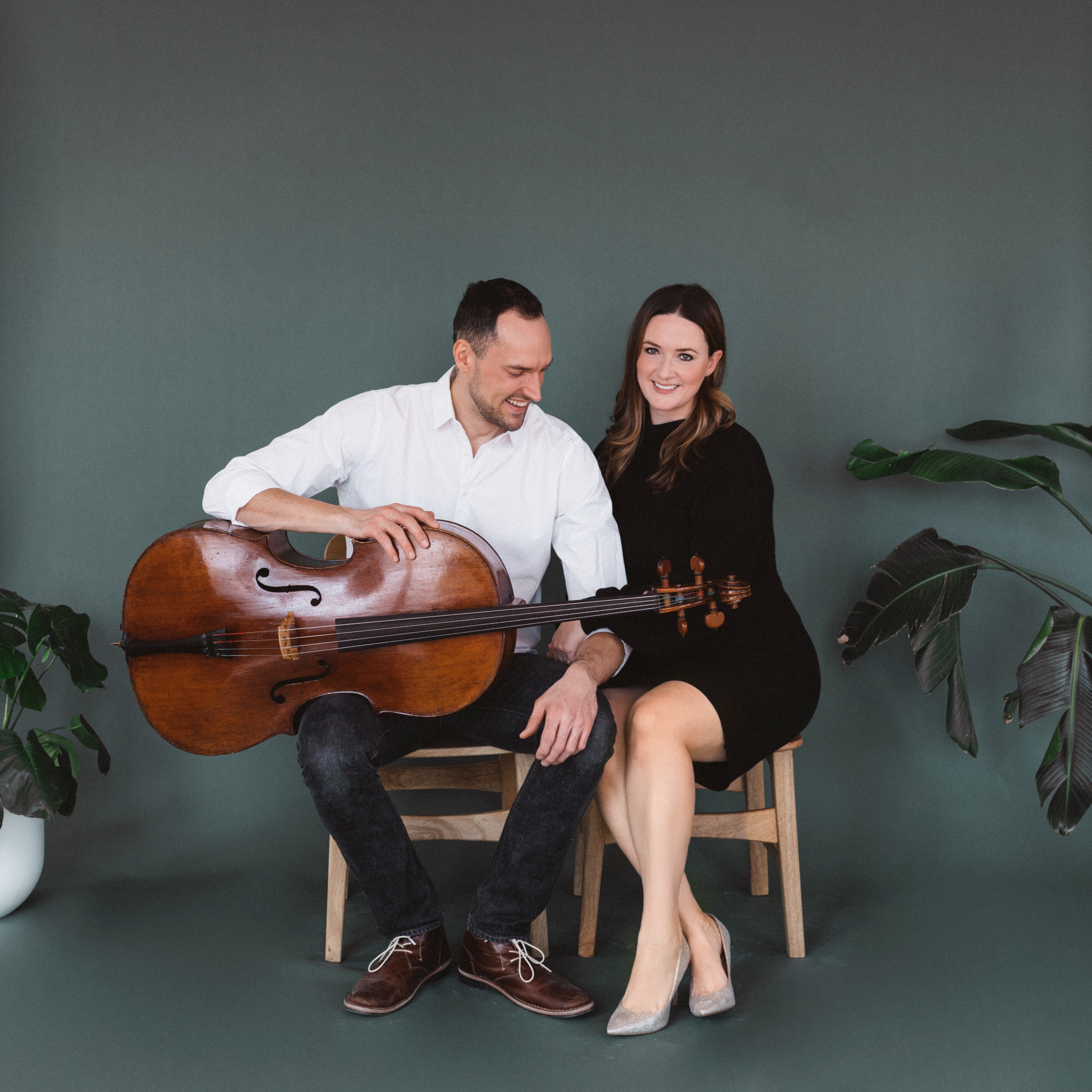

Background information
- Origin: Brooklyn, New York
- Genres: Classical crossover
- Instruments: Piano, Cello
- Years active: 2014–present
- Members: Marnie Laird, Patrick Laird
- Website: https://www.brooklynduo.com

YouTube information
- Channel: Brooklyn Duo
- Subscribers: 1.56 million
- Views: 548 million
- Last updated: June 8, 2026

Brooklyn Duo is an American classical crossover ensemble from Brooklyn, New York, consisting of Marnie Laird on piano and Patrick Laird on cello. Brooklyn Duo was founded in 2014 when the married couple posted two cover videos on YouTube, one of which was a cover of "Empire" by Shakira. Shakira noticed the video and mentioned it in a tweet, saying, "We're loving Brooklyn Duo's piano/cello cover of #Empire! Great work guys." Because of this exposure and the positive response they were getting on YouTube, Brooklyn Duo continued to release instrumental cello and piano arrangements of popular songs and were able to grow a large fanbase on YouTube and other platforms. They now have more than 1.5 million subscribers on YouTube and over 740,000 monthly listeners on Spotify

== Personal life ==
In 2006, Marnie and Patrick both participated in a chamber music program in Maine called Kneisel Hall, where they met for the first time. In 2012, the couple got married. They now have two children together, a daughter born in 2017, and a son born in 2020.

== Members ==
Marnie grew up in Vancouver, British Columbia. She made her solo orchestral debut at thirteen years old with the Vancouver Symphony Orchestra. She has a master's degree in solo piano performance from the University of British Columbia. She later attended The Juilliard School, where she received a second master's degree in collaborative piano. Following Juilliard, Marnie was accepted to the prestigious New World Symphony orchestral academy in Miami, where she worked as the principal pianist for three years under the direction of Michael Tilson Thomas.

Patrick grew up in New Jersey. He attended the Eastman School of Music in Rochester, New York, and graduated with a bachelor's degree in performance. During his time in college, he helped create the cello rock band Break of Reality, which was formed in 2003. The band released four full-length albums, including The Sound Between (2006), Spectrum of the Sky (2009), Covers (2012), and Ten (2014). The group experienced success as an alt-classical chamber ensemble. Their most popular release is their cover of the Game of Thrones theme, which has over 27 million views on YouTube.

== Discography ==
Brooklyn Duo albums:

- Brooklyn Sessions and Brooklyn Sessions vols. 2–11
- Chamber Music (feat. Dover Quartet)
- A Brooklyn Duo Christmas
