= Farida Bahnas =

Egyptian rhythmic gymnast

- Full name: Farida Mohamed Yehia Zakaria Bahnas
- Born: 10 October 2010 (age 15) Cairo, Egypt

Gymnastics career
- Discipline: Rhythmic gymnastics
- Country represented: Egypt; (2023-)
Medal record
Rhythmic Gymnastics
Representing Egypt
African Championships
| Gold medal – first place | 2026 Tshwane | Team |
| Gold medal – first place | 2026 Tshwane | All-Around |
| Gold medal – first place | 2026 Tshwane | Ball |
| Silver medal – second place | 2026 Tshwane | Hoop |
| Silver medal – second place | 2026 Tshwane | Clubs |
Junior World Championships
| Silver medal – second place | 2025 Sofia | Clubs |
Junior African Championships
| Gold medal – first place | 2024 Kigali | Team |

Farida Bahnas (Arabic: فريدة بهنس; born 10 October 2010) is an Egyptian rhythmic gymnast. She represents Egypt in international competitions.

== Biography ==
=== Junior ===
In July 2023 Bahnas competed with hoop in the 2nd Junior World Championships in Cluj-Napoca, being 15th with the apparatus and 16th in teams. At the 2024 African Championships in Kigali she took gold in teams along Alia Ahmed, Iman Abdelhalim and Lina Heleika.

In 2025 she took part in the Pharaoh's cup, being 5th with clubs and winning bronze with hoop. In June she participated in the 3rd Junior World Championships in Sofia, finishing 12th in teams along Lina Heleika and the junior group, 9th with hoop and won an historical silver medal with clubs, tied with Kseniya Zhyzhych, the first ever medal for Egypt at a World Championships at either junior and senior level.

=== Senior ===
Bahnas became age-eligible for senior competitions in 2026. In March, she made her World Cup at Sofia World Cup, placing 39th in all-around. In April, she was 45th in all-around at Tashkent World Cup and 49th in all-around at Baku World Cup. In May she was selected for the African Championships in Tshwane, winning gold in the all-around and gold in teams with Lina Heleika. She also won gold in ball and silver in clubs and hoop finals. In July, she took 63rd place in all-around at Milan World Cup. In August, she was selected to represent Egypt alongside Lina Heleika at the 2026 World Championships in Frankfurt, Germany. She ended on 51st place in all-around qualifications. Afterwards, she competed at the 2026 Mediterranean Games in Taranto, Italy, and ended on 11th place in all-around qualifications.

== Achievements ==
- First Egyptian rhythmic gymnast to win a medal in an individual apparatus final at World Championships at both junior and senior level.

== Routine music information ==
| Year | Apparatus | Music title |
|---|---|---|
| 2026 | Hoop | Trøllabundin by Eivør |
| 2026 | Ball | The Plagues (Epic Version) by Samuel Kim |
| 2026 | Clubs | The Pitch (Spectacular Spectacular) by Moulin Rouge 2 cast |
| 2026 | Ribbon | |
| 2025 | Hoop | Trøllabundin by Eivør |
| 2025 | Ball | Fantasy On Ice by Sarah Àlainn |
| 2025 | Clubs | The Pitch (Spectacular Spectacular) by Moulin Rouge 2 cast |
| 2025 | Ribbon | Dracula's Journey by Kevin Gray (feat. Gary Marachek, D Pettit & Gabriel Boston-Friedman) |
