= 2026 African Rhythmic Gymnastics Championships =

Rhythmic gymnastics competition

2026 African Gymnastics Championships
- Venue: Heartfelt Arena
- Location: Tshwane, South Africa
- Start date: 30 April 2026
- End date: 2 May 2026

The 2026 African Rhythmic Gymnastics Championships also known as The 20th African Championships was held from 30 April to 2 May 2026 in Tshwane, South Africa. For 2026, the event also doubles as the Oceania Rhythmic Gymnastics Championships, with the gymnasts from Australia and New Zealand being ranked separately from the African competitors.

== Competition schedule ==
Thursday, 30 April 2026

- Opening Ceremony
- Qualification – Individual
- Qualification – Group

Friday, 1 May 2026

- Qualification – Individual
- Qualification – Group
- Medal Ceremony – All Around and Group

Saturday, 2 May 2026

- Rhythmic Gymnastics Finals – Senior and Junior
- Medal Ceremony

== Medal winners ==
=== Senior ===
Event	Gold	Silver	Bronze
Team
Team	Egypt; Farida Bahnas; Lina Heleika	South Africa; Stephanie Dimitrova; Chade Jansen	Angola; Luana Gomes; Florencia Missende; Aysha Morgado
Individual Finals
All-Around	Farida Bahnas (EGY)	Lina Heleika (EGY)	Stephanie Dimitrova (RSA)
Hoop	Lina Heleika (EGY)	Farida Bahnas (EGY)	Luana Gomes (ANG)
Ball	Farida Bahnas (EGY)	Lina Heleika (EGY)	Stephanie Dimitrova (RSA)
Clubs	Lina Heleika (EGY)	Farida Bahnas (EGY)	Stephanie Dimitrova (RSA)
Ribbon	Lina Heleika (EGY)	Luana Gomes (ANG)	Stephanie Dimitrova (RSA)
Group Finals
All-Around	Egypt; Yasmin Ali; Marwa Abdellah; Joudy Attya; Roaa Riad; Maryam Elbanaa; Batol Elsayed	South Africa; Tayla Pile; Hanna Muir; Boipelo Khomo; Qhawekazi Nzimande; Hanna Mia; Sinead De Wet	

=== Junior ===
Event	Gold	Silver	Bronze
Team
Team	Egypt; Mariam Aboulatta; Lojain Elkadim; Celia Mohamed; Farida Mokhtar	South Africa; Haylee De Jager; Kenzie Malan; Diana Oliver; Ruby Richards	Tunisia; Chahd Hosni; Sandra Ghoul; Lina Ennouri; Rined Ben Abdallah
Individual Finals
All-Around	Celia Mohamed (EGY)	Lojain Elkadim (EGY)	Chahd Hosni (TUN)
Hoop	Celia Mohamed (EGY)	Mariam Aboulatta (EGY)	Chahd Hosni (TUN)
Ball	Farida Mokhtar (EGY)	Celia Mohamed (EGY)	Sannah Alexandra Simon (MAR)
Clubs	Lojain Elkadim (EGY)	Farida Mokhtar (EGY)	Chahd Hosni (TUN)
Ribbon	Lojain Elkadim (EGY)	Mariam Aboulatta (EGY)	Chahd Hosni (TUN)
Group Finals
All-Around	Egypt; Alia Elbadry; Habiba Genady; Khadiga Nassib; Laila Shabana; Myriam Abbas; Nadia Elshawarby	South Africa; Skyler Herbst; Nomthandazo Madela; Chrissy George; Misa Van Niekerk; Hanna Chengiah; Thandolwethu Mthiyane	Morocco; Alae Douama; Chahd Touitou; Loujaine El Houdaigui; Jannat Zouhidi; Lina Messaoudi
5 Balls	Egypt; Alia Elbadry; Habiba Genady; Khadiga Nassib; Laila Shabana; Myriam Abbas; Nadia Elshawarby	South Africa; Skyler Herbst; Nomthandazo Madela; Chrissy George; Misa Van Niekerk; Hanna Chengiah; Thandolwethu Mthiyane	Morocco; Alae Douama; Chahd Touitou; Loujaine El Houdaigui; Jannat Zouhidi; Lina Messaoudi
5 Ribbons	Egypt; Alia Elbadry; Habiba Genady; Khadiga Nassib; Laila Shabana; Myriam Abbas; Nadia Elshawarby	South Africa; Skyler Herbst; Nomthandazo Madela; Chrissy George; Misa Van Niekerk; Hanna Chengiah; Thandolwethu Mthiyane	Morocco; Alae Douama; Chahd Touitou; Loujaine El Houdaigui; Jannat Zouhidi; Lina Messaoudi

=== Oceanian Championships ===
Event	Gold	Silver	Bronze
Individuals
All-Around	Alicia Tan (AUS)	Sofia Hemmings (AUS)	Havana Hopman (NZL)
Groups
All-Around	Australia; Joselyn Cheung; Aggie Fan; Alina Yu; Isabella Wang; Victoria Wei		

== Medal count ==
* Host nation (South Africa)

Rank	Nation	Gold	Silver	Bronze	Total
1	Egypt	16	9	0	25
2	South Africa*	0	6	4	10
3	Angola	0	1	2	3
4	Tunisia	0	0	5	5
5	Morocco	0	0	4	4
Totals (5 entries)		16	16	15	47
