= Salome Lozano Leon =

French rhythmic gymnast

- Born: 18 December 2007 (age 18) Calais

Gymnastics career
- Discipline: Rhythmic gymnastics
- Country represented: France; (2021-2025)
- Club: Calais GRS
- Head coach: Anna Baranova
- Assistant coach: Sara Bayón
- Choreographer: Gregory Milan
- Retired: Yes
Medal record
Rhythmic Gymnastics
Representing France
| Event | 1st | 2nd | 3rd |
|---|---|---|---|
| FIG World Cup | 0 | 0 | 1 |
| Total | 0 | 0 | 1 |
European Championships
| Silver medal – second place | 2025 Tallinn | 5 Ribbons |

Salome Lozano Leon (born 18 December 2007) is a retired French rhythmic gymnast. She represented France as a member of the senior group.

== Biography ==
In July 2017 Lozano was invited to a national training for pre juniors. Two years later she won bronze at the 2019 French national championships. She was later called up for another national training camp. In 2021 she took bronze at nationals among gymnasts born in 2007 behind Margot Tran and Shana Loxton-Vernaton. She was then again called up for a national training camp.

In March 2022 she took part in a national test to select the team for the European Championships. On 28 April 2023 she took part in a demonstration in Miramas. In August she was present in another demonstration in Thiais. The following year she took part in the Thiais Grand Prix. Then she was listed as a reserve for the European Championships in Budapest.

In 2025, with the retirement of some of the members of the previous group, she became a starter making her debut at the Grand Prix in Thiais. There she won silver in the All-Around and bronze with 5 ribbons. In April the group competed in the World Cup in Sofia, being 8th overall, 10th with 5 ribbons and 8th with 3 balls & 2 hoops. Weeks later they were in Tashkent, taking 6th place in the All-Around, 6th place with 5 ribbons and 4th place in the mixed final. In May they participated in the stage in Portimão, finishing 5th with 5 ribbons, 6th with 3 balls & 2 hoops and winning bronze in the All-Around. She was then selected for the European Championships in Tallinn, where the group was 9th overall and won silver in the 5 ribbons final.
