= Havana Hopman =

New Zealand rhythmic gymnast

- Full name: Havana Rosalie Hopman
- Born: 16 October 2003 (age 22) Auckland, New Zealand
- Height: 169 cm (5 ft 7 in)

Gymnastics career
- Discipline: Rhythmic gymnastics
- Country represented: New Zealand (2022-)
- Club: Counties Manukau Gymnastics
- Head coach: Elena Pirozhenko
- Assistant coach: Tracey Redhead
Medal record
Rhythmic Gymnastics
Representing New Zealand
Oceanian Championships
Gold medal – first place	2023 Manila	All-Around
Silver medal – second place	2025 Singapore	All-Around
Bronze medal – third place	2024 Budapest	All-Around
Bronze medal – third place	2026 Tschwane	All-Around

Havana Rosalie Hopman (born 16 October 2003) is a New Zealand individual rhythmic gymnast. She is the 2023 Oceanian champion, the 2025 Oceanian silver medalist, and the 2024 bronze medalist. She represented New Zealand at the 2022 Commonwealth Games.

== Personal life ==
Hopman has an older brother. She began rhythmic gymnastics at age seven after a swimming coach told her parents that her flexible feet would make her a good ballet dancer and gymnast, and her ballet teacher showed her a video of her daughter performing rhythmic gymnasts, which made Hopman interested in trying it. Her dream is to compete at the 2024 Olympic Games in Paris. Her idol is New Zealand athlete Portia Bing. Outside the sporting hall her hobbies are spending time with family and friends, walking her dogs, baking.

In 2021 she began studying for a degree in health sciences at the University of Auckland. When she was in high school, she competed in high jump and coached the school's rhythmic gymnasts. Her father died in 2023 from lung cancer.

== Career ==
Hopman debuted internationally at the 2022 World Cup in Sofia, ending 31st in the all-around. She fell seriously ill with a viral chest infection, and though she was able to compete at the event, she was later hospitalised while still in Bulgaria.

After she recovered, she competed at the next World Cup in Tashkent, taking 16th place in the all-around. At the next World Cup in Baku, she 29th in the all-around. Her performance on the World Cup series allowed her to be nominated to compete at the 2022 Commonwealth Games.

At the end of May, she took part in the Oceania Championships in Carrara, where she was 4th with hoop and ball and won bronze with clubs and ribbon. In August, she competed at the Commonwealth Games in Birmingham, ending 9th in the all-around and 4th in the clubs final. She ended her year competing at the World Championships in Sofia, where she was 53rd in the all-around.

The next year, Hopman competed at the World Cup in Palaio Faliro, where she placed 30th in the all-around. She won the Oceanian Championships title despite having badly sprained her ankle shortly before the competition. In August, she competed at the World Championships, where she placed 39th, the best-ever placement for a New Zealand rhythmic gymnast.

At the 2024 Oceanian Championships, she won the bronze medal. The Olympic quota available at the competition went instead to Australian Alexandra Kiroi-Bogatyreva. Hopman joined the Gymnastics NZ Athletes Council, which advises the organisation on the needs and concerns of athletes. At the New Zealand Championships in November, she won her fourth all-around title as well as every event final.

In 2025, Hopman competed on the Rhythmic Gymnastics Grand Prix series in Thiais, where she qualified for all four apparatus finals. Her best placement was 4th in the ball final. The next week, she competed at the World Cup in Bulgaria, where she finished 19th in the all-around. In May, she won silver at the Oceanian Championships.

== Routine music information ==
Year	Apparatus	Music Title
2025	Hoop	What's This by VoicePlay
2025	Ball	Oops!... I Did It Again by Scott Bradlee's Postmodern Jukebox
2025	Clubs	Once Upon a Dream by Lana Del Rey
2025	Ribbon	The Countdown Is Final by Séarlas Mag Uidhir
