= Alicia Tan =

Australian rhythmic gymnast

- Born: 8 January 2010 (age 16) Clayton, Victoria, Australia

Gymnastics career
- Discipline: Rhythmic gymnastics
- Country represented: Australia; (2023-present)
- Club: Prahran Rhythmic Gymnastics
Medal record
Rhythmic Gymnastics
Representing Australia
Oceanian Championships
Gold medal – first place	2026 Tshwane	All-Around

Alicia Tan (born 8 January 2010) is an Australian individual rhythmic gymnast. She represents Australia in international competitions.

== Biography ==
=== Junior ===
Tan made her international debut competing with hoop at the 2023 Junior World Championships in Cluj-Napoca, taking 38th place.

In 2024 she won gold with hoop at the Australian Championships. In September she took 6th place among juniors at the AEON Cup in Tokyo.

In June 2025 she was selected to represent Australia again at the 3rd Junior World Championships in Sofia. There she made history by becoming the first Australian gymnast to qualify for an event final at the World Championships at both junior and senior level by qualifying for both the hoop and the clubs final, in the end she was 7th with hoop and 7th with clubs. At nationals she won silver in teams (along Yaroslava Kuzmenko and Ella Nguyen) as well as gold in the All-Around and in all the event finals. In the following weeks she was awarded a Gymsport award for best junior rhythmic gymnast in 2024.

=== Senior ===
Tan became age-eligible for senior competitions in 2026. On April 10-12, she made her World Cup debut competing at Tashkent World Cup. She ended on 33rd place in all-around and almost qualified to hoop final (11th place). She won gold medal in all-around at the 2026 Oceanian Championships.

== Achievements ==
- First Australian rhythmic gymnast to qualify for an individual apparatus final at Junior World Championships.

== Routine music information ==
Year	Apparatus	Music title
2026	Hoop	Wondrous World by Power-Haus & Christian Reindl
2026	Ball	Hallelujah by Alexandra Burke
2026	Clubs	Worth It (feat. Christian Reindl) by Power-Haus
2026	Ribbon	Becoming a Geisha by John Williams
2025	Hoop	Waltz from Swan Lake, Op. 20 by the London Philharmonic Orchestra
2025	Ball	
2025	Clubs	Oye Negra by Terry Snyder
2025	Ribbon	
