= 2025 Junior World Rhythmic Gymnastics Championships =

Rhythmic gymnastics competition

3rd Rhythmic Gymnastics Junior World Championships
- Venue: Armeets Arena
- Location: Sofia, Bulgaria
- Start date: 18 June 2025
- End date: 22 June 2025

The 2025 Rhythmic Gymnastics Junior World Championships is the third edition of the Rhythmic Gymnastics Junior World Championships. They were held in Sofia, Bulgaria, from 18 June to 22 June 2025.

== Participating nations ==
- Authorised Neutral Athletes (3)
- Andorra (3)
- Argentina (2)
- Australia (9)
- Austria (4)
- Azerbaijan (10)
- Belgium (2)
- Bosnia and Herzegovina (4)
- Brazil (8)
- Bulgaria (9)
- Canada (7)
- Chile (10)
- China (2)
- Colombia (3)
- Croatia (3)
- Cyprus (4)
- Czech Republic (10)
- Ecuador (1)
- Egypt (9)
- Spain (9)
- Estonia (9)
- Finland (8)
- France (3)
- United Kingdom (10)
- Georgia (10)
- Germany (9)
- Greece (10)
- Hong Kong (4)
- Hungary (9)
- India (4)
- Israel (10)*
- Italy (10)
- Japan (8)
- Kazakhstan (8)
- Kyrgyzstan (10)
- South Korea (8)
- Kuwait (1)
- Latvia (8)
- Lebanon (4)
- Lithuania (9)
- Luxembourg (2)
- Madagascar (1)
- Malaysia (10)
- Moldova (8)
- Mexico (9)
- Mongolia (2)
- Montenegro (2)
- Mauritius (1)
- Namibia (3)
- Netherlands (2)
- Norway (8)
- New Zealand (2)
- Philippines (3)
- Poland (9)
- Portugal (7)
- Romania (2)
- South Africa (7)
- Singapore (2)
- Slovenia (4)
- San Marino (2)
- Serbia (2)
- Slovakia (10)
- Syria (2)
- Thailand (1)
- Chinese Taipei (8)
- Tunisia (3)
- Turkey (8)
- Ukraine (10)
- United States (10)
- Uzbekistan (9)
- Venezuela (1)

*On June 15 2025 the Israeli federation announced the individuals wouldn't take part in the championships due to impossibility to travel.

== Competition schedule ==
All times in local time (UTC+03:00).

- Wednesday, 18 June
  - 10:00 - 19:10 Junior Individual Qualification: Hoop and Ball
- Thursday, 19 June
  - 10:00 - 19:10 Junior Individual Qualification: Clubs and Ribbon
- Saturday, 21 June
  - 11:00 - 13:35 Junior Group All-Around - Group A
  - 14:30 - 16:50 Junior Group All-Around - Group B
  - 17:10 Team Award Ceremony (RGI & RGG combined)
- Sunday, 22 June
  - 13:00 - 13:40 Individual Hoop Apparatus Final
  - 13:45 - 14:25 Individual Ball Apparatus Final
  - 14:30 - 14:45 Award Ceremony RGI Hoop & Ball
  - 14:45 - 15:25 Group 5 Pairs of Clubs Apparatus Final
  - 15:30 - 15:40 Award Ceremony RGG 5 Pairs of Clubs
  - 15:40 - 16:20 Individual Clubs Apparatus Final
  - 16:25 - 17:05 Individual Ribbon Apparatus Final
  - 17:10 - 17:25 Award Ceremony RGI Clubs & Ribbon
  - 17:25 - 18:10 Group 5 Hoops Apparatus Final
  - 20:30 - 23:30 Award Ceremony RGG 5 Hoops

== Medal winners ==
Event	Gold	Silver	Bronze
Team Competition
Team All-Around	Bulgaria Individual: Anastasia Kaleva; Aleksa Rasheva; Magdalena Valkova; Group: Raya Bozhilova; Anania Dimitrova; Elena Hristova; Yoana Moteva; Gabriela Traykova; Ivayla Velkovska	United States Individual: Natalie de la Rosa; Anna Filipp; Alicia Liu; Group: Sasha Kuliyev; Nina Keys; Leyla Kukhmazova; Ziah Khan; Alana Hirota; Katherine Roytman	Uzbekistan Individual: Viktoriya Nikiforova; Sofiya Usova; Group: Yosina Djuraeva; Alana Khafizova; Zamira Khvalcheva; Milana Safina; Kristina Shin; Jasmine Yakhlakova
Individual Finals
Hoop	Magdalena Valkova (BUL)	Akmaral Yerekesheva (KAZ)	Natalie de la Rosa (USA)
Ball	Akmaral Yerekesheva (KAZ)	Wang Qi (CHN)	Nita Jamagidze (GEO)
Clubs	Zlata Arkatova (KGZ)	Farida Bahnas (EGY) Kseniya Zhyzhych (POL)	Not awarded
Ribbon	Akmaral Yerekesheva (KAZ)	Lina Heleika (EGY)	Magdalena Valkova (BUL)
Groups Finals
All-Around	Bulgaria; Raya Bozhilova; Anania Dimitrova; Elena Hristova; Yoana Moteva; Gabriela Traykova; Ivayla Velkovska	Brazil; Andriely Cichovicz; Júlia Colere; Amanda Manente; Alice Neves; Clara Pereira	Ukraine; Ahata Bilenko; Marharyta Melnyk; Anastasiia Nikolenko; Taisiia Redka; Oleksandra Nikol Samoukina; Kateryna Shershen
5 Clubs	Ukraine; Ahata Bilenko; Marharyta Melnyk; Anastasiia Nikolenko; Taisiia Redka; Oleksandra Nikol Samoukina; Kateryna Shershen	Italy; Flavia Cassano; Elisa Maria Comignani; Chiara Cortese; Virginia Galeazzi; Ginevra Pascarella; Elisabetta Valdifiori	Bulgaria; Raya Bozhilova; Anania Dimitrova; Elena Hristova; Yoana Moteva; Gabriela Traykova; Ivayla Velkovska
5 Hoops	Bulgaria; Raya Bozhilova; Anania Dimitrova; Elena Hristova; Yoana Moteva; Gabriela Traykova; Ivayla Velkovska	Brazil; Andriely Cichovicz; Júlia Colere; Amanda Manente; Alice Neves; Clara Pereira	Estonia; Alexandra Ivahnenko; Sofia Jakovleva; Kristiina Jegorova; Ekaterina Korzikskaja; Anastasia Nemerovskaja; Anna Karolina Obolonina Italy; Flavia Cassano; Elisa Maria Comignani; Chiara Cortese; Virginia Galeazzi; Ginevra Pascarella; Elisabetta Valdifiori

== Results ==
=== Team ===
Rank	Nation	Total
1st place, gold medalist(s)	Bulgaria	147.350
2nd place, silver medalist(s)	United States	143.200
3rd place, bronze medalist(s)	Uzbekistan	141.850
4	Estonia	141.100
5	Italy	140.950
6	Poland	140.850
7	Brazil	140.650
8	Germany	137.400
9	Hungary	137.150
10	Azerbaijan	136.500
11	Spain	136.450
12	Egypt	135.350
13	Turkey	134.100
14	Kazakhstan	133.250
15	Georgia	132.100
16	South Korea	131.300
17	Mexico	130.900
18	Greece	130.250
19	Canada	126.450
20	Japan	126.150
21	Portugal	124.900
22	Finland	124.850
23	Australia	124.600
24	United Kingdom	124.250
24	Lithuania	124.250
26	Czech Republic	122.000
27	Slovakia	121.750
28	Latvia	121.450
29	Malaysia	120.300
30	Moldova	119.000
31	Chile	111.900
32	Norway	111.050
33	South Africa	98.450
34	Chinese Taipei	97.450

=== Individuals ===
==== Hoop ====
Rank	Gymnast	Nation	D Score	E Score	A Score	Pen	Total
1st place, gold medalist(s)	Magdalena Valkova	Bulgaria	11.500	7.950	7.900		27.350
2nd place, silver medalist(s)	Akmaral Yerekesheva	Kazakhstan	10.800	8.150	7.900		26.950
3rd place, bronze medalist(s)	Natalie de la Rosa	United States	10.300	8.050	8.150		26.450
4	Viktoriya Nikiforova	Uzbekistan	10.200	7.750	7.600		25.550
5	Alicia Tan	Australia	9.300	7.650	7.500		24.450
6	Mariia Shybanova	Poland	8.500	7.450	7.550		23.500
7	Valeria Kaminidou	Greece	8.500	7.050	7.600		23.150
8	Azada Atakishiyeva	Azerbaijan	8.300	6.450	7.200		21.950

==== Ball ====
Rank	Gymnast	Nation	D Score	E Score	A Score	Pen	Total
1st place, gold medalist(s)	Akmaral Yerekesheva	Kazakhstan	10.200	8.100	7.850		26,150
2nd place, silver medalist(s)	Wang Qi	China	9.700	8.100	8.150		25.950
3rd place, bronze medalist(s)	Nita Jamagidze	Georgia	9.500	7.950	8.100		25.550
4	Kira Babkevich	Authorised Neutral Athletes	9.400	8.000	7.950		25.350
5	Kseniya Zhyzhych	Poland	9.600	7.750	7.900		25.250
6	Algara Kochankova	France	8.200	7.700	8.050	0.050	23.900
7	Patricia Stanciu	Romania	8.300	7.200	8.100		23.600
8	Regina Orvendi	Hungary	8.600	6.400	7.400		21.950

==== Clubs ====
Rank	Gymnast	Nation	D Score	E Score	A Score	Pen	Total
1st place, gold medalist(s)	Zlata Arkatova	Kyrgyzstan	10.300	7.900	7.400		25.600
2nd place, silver medalist(s)	Farida Bahnas	Egypt	9.500	7.900	8.150		25.550
2nd place, silver medalist(s)	Kseniya Zhyzhych	Poland	10.100	7.850	7.600		25.550
4	Fidan Gurbanli	Azerbaijan	9.800	7.700	7.850		25.350
5	Aiganym Rysbek	Kazakhstan	9.300	8.100	7.750		25.150
6	Natalie de la Rosa	United States	9.100	7.400	7.900		24.400
7	Alicia Tan	Australia	8.500	7.150	7.450	0.300	22.800
8	Anastasia Kaleva	Bulgaria	8.300	6.400	7.500		22.200

==== Ribbon ====
Rank	Gymnast	Nation	D Score	E Score	A Score	Pen	Total
1st place, gold medalist(s)	Akmaral Yerekesheva	Kazakhstan	10.400	8.100	7.900		26.400
2nd place, silver medalist(s)	Lina Heleika	Egypt	9.600	8.000	8.250		25.850
3rd place, bronze medalist(s)	Magdalena Valkova	Bulgaria	9.800	7.900	7.800		25.500
4	Wang Qi	China	9.400	8.100	7.850		25.350
4	Alicia Liu	United States	9.500	8.000	7.850		25.350
6	Sofiya Usova	Uzbekistan	8.800	7.450	7.950		24.200
7	Kseniya Zhyzhych	Poland	8.700	7.400	7.550		23.650
8	Alisa Datsenko	Germany	8.200	7.150	7.650		23.000

=== Groups ===
==== All-Around ====
Rank	Nation	5	5	Total
1st place, gold medalist(s)	Bulgaria	25.400	24.500	49.900
2nd place, silver medalist(s)	Brazil	23.800	25.100	48.900
3rd place, bronze medalist(s)	Ukraine	24.000	24.400	48.400
4	Italy	23.350	24.200	47.550
5	Spain	23.950	23.450	47.400
6	Estonia	21.850	24.700	46.550
7	Uzbekistan	23.050	22.950	46.000
8	United States	21.850	23.400	45.250
9	Hungary	22.200	21.850	44.050
10	Poland	21.500	21.800	43.300
11	Turkey	21.750	21.350	43.100
12	Germany	20.500	22.300	42.800
13	Azerbaijan	20.650	21.650	42.300
14	Mexico	18.950	22.550	41.500
15	Czech Republic	20.500	19.900	40.400
16	Canada	20.900	19.150	40.050
17	Lithuania	18.750	20.950	39.700
18	Portugal	19.350	20.150	39.500
19	Egypt	19.600	19.200	38.800
20	Georgia	17.200	21.200	38.400
21	South Korea	20.550	17.300	37.850
22	Slovakia	17.200	20.550	37.750
23	Japan	19.350	18.000	37.350
24	Greece	17.650	19.300	36.950
25	Latvia	18.400	17.650	36.050
26	Finland	20.150	15.550	35.700
27	Australia	17.150	17.300	34.450
28	United Kingdom	15.100	18.250	33.350
29	Malaysia	16.850	15.600	32.450
30	Norway	18.550	13.300	31.850
31	Moldova	16.700	14.900	31.600
32	Chile	13.700	17.700	31.400
33	Kazakhstan	11.150	19.600	30.750
34	Chinese Taipei	10.050	16.950	27.000
35	South Africa	12.850	12.050	24.900

==== 5 Clubs ====
Rank	Nation	D Score	E Score	A Score	Pen	Total
1st place, gold medalist(s)	Ukraine	9.600	7.350	7.950		24.900
2nd place, silver medalist(s)	Italy	8.900	7.250	8.050		24.200
3rd place, bronze medalist(s)	Bulgaria	9.200	6.950	8.000		24.150
4	Spain	9.400	7.200	7.900		24.100
5	Brazil	8.700	6.650	7.600		22.950
6	United States	8.800	6.700	7.400		22.900
7	Uzbekistan	9.000	6.150	7.450		22.600
8	Hungary	8.500	5.300	7.250		21.050

==== 5 Hoops ====
Rank	Nation	D Score	E Score	A Score	Pen	Total
1st place, gold medalist(s)	Bulgaria	11.000	7.450	8.150		26.600
2nd place, silver medalist(s)	Brazil	10.400	7.050	7.900		25.350
3rd place, bronze medalist(s)	Estonia	10.400	7.100	7.650	0.050	25.100
3rd place, bronze medalist(s)	Italy	10.100	7.050	7.950		25.100
5	Spain	10.000	7.050	7.850		24.900
6	Ukraine	9.800	6.600	7.700		24.100
7	Uzbekistan	9.200	6.350	7.300		22.850
8	United States	9.600	6.000	7.150		22.750

== Medal count ==
* Host nation (Bulgaria)

Rank	Nation	Gold	Silver	Bronze	Total
1	Bulgaria*	4	0	2	6
2	Kazakhstan	2	1	0	3
3	Ukraine	1	0	1	2
4	Kyrgyzstan	1	0	0	1
5	Brazil	0	2	0	2
5	Egypt	0	2	0	2
7	Italy	0	1	1	2
7	United States	0	1	1	2
9	China	0	1	0	1
9	Poland	0	1	0	1
11	Estonia	0	0	1	1
11	Georgia	0	0	1	1
11	Uzbekistan	0	0	1	1
Totals (13 entries)		8	9	8	25
