= 2025 Rhythmic Gymnastics European Championships =

- Venue: Unibet Arena
- Location: (Estonia) Tallinn
- Start date: 04 June 2025
- End date: 08 June 2025

The 2025 Rhythmic Gymnastics European Championships is the 41st edition of the Rhythmic Gymnastics European Championships. The competition is took place from 4 to 8 June 2025 at the Unibet Arena in Tallinn, Estonia. It acted as a qualifying event for the 2025 Rhythmic Gymnastics World Championships; 12 countries earned quotas to send an individual team to the World Championships.

The individual all-around champion was Taisiia Onofriichuk; she was the first Ukrainian European champion in almost thirty years, since the 1997 Championships. The reigning European champion, Stiliana Nikolova, won silver, and the reigning Olympic champion, Darja Varfolomeev, won bronze. In the apparatus finals, Nikolova won three out of four events (ball, hoop, clubs), while Varfolomeev won the ribbon final.

In the group event, the Spanish group dominated the competition, winning all three gold medals in the all-around and both event finals. The all-around medal was the second for Spanish groups after they first won a medal at the 1992 Championships. The Israeli group won the all-around silver and the Hungarian group the bronze. In the five ribbons final, the French group won its first-ever European silver medal, and in the mixed apparatus final, the German group won its first European medal of any color.

The Shooting Star award was presented to Slovenian Brigita Krašovec. She is heavily involved in choreographing her routines, has taught classes abroad, and is also a World champion in modern dance.

== Participating countries ==
- Andorra
- Armenia
- Austria
- Azerbaijan
- Belgium
- Bosnia and Herzegovina
- Bulgaria
- Croatia
- Cyprus
- Czech Republic
- Spain
- Estonia
- Finland
- France
- Great Britain
- Georgia
- Germany
- Greece
- Hungary
- Israel
- Italy
- Latvia
- Lithuania
- Luxembourg
- Moldova
- Montenegro
- Netherlands
- Norway
- Poland
- Portugal
- Romania
- Slovenia
- San Marino
- Serbia
- Switzerland
- Slovakia
- Sweden
- Turkey
- Ukraine

Updated May 2 2025

== Competition schedule ==
- Wednesday June 04
  - 12:00-13:50 Junior groups qualification & AA ranking (5 Hoops & 5 Pairs of Clubs), Set A
  - 12:00-13:50 Junior groups qualification & AA ranking (5 Hoops & 5 Pairs of Clubs), Set B
  - 18:00-18:45 Opening ceremony
  - 18:55-19:35 Junior groups 5 Hoops Final
  - 19:40-20:20 Junior groups 5 Pairs of Clubs Final
  - 20:30-20:45 Award ceremonies
- Thursday June 05
  - 10:00-12:00 Set A Senior Individuals qualifications (hoop & ball)
  - 12:15-14:15 Set B Senior Individuals qualifications (hoop & ball)
  - 15:45-17:45 Set C Senior Individuals qualifications (hoop & ball)
  - 18:00-20:00 Set D Senior Individuals qualifications (hoop & ball)
- Friday June 06
  - 10:00-12:00 Set C Senior Individuals qualifications (clubs & ribbon)
  - 12:15-14:15 Set D Senior Individuals qualifications (clubs & ribbon)
  - 15:45-17:45 Set A Senior Individuals qualifications (clubs & ribbon)
  - 18:00-20:00 Set B Senior Individuals qualifications (clubs & ribbon)
- Saturday June 07
  - 09:30-12:25 Senior Individuals AA Final (hoop, ball, clubs, ribbon – SET B)
  - 13:20-16:15 Senior Individuals AA Final (hoop, ball, clubs, ribbon – SET A)
  - 17:00-18:55 Senior Groups (5 ribbons and 3 balls & 2 hoops – SET A)
  - 19:15-20:55 Senior Groups (5 ribbons and 3 balls & 2 hoops – SET B)
  - 21:00-21:25 Award Ceremony AA Senior Groups & Team (Senior Individuals and Senior Groups)
- Sunday June 08
  - 12:10 – 13:15 Senior Individuals Hoop & Ball Finals
  - 13:20 – 14:25 Senior Individuals Clubs & Ribbon Finals
  - 14:30 – 14:55 Award Ceremony Senior Individual Apparatus finals
  - 16:25 – 17:10 Senior Groups 5 Ribbons Final
  - 17:15 – 17:57 Senior Groups 3 balls & 2 hoops Final
  - 18:05 – 18:20 Award Ceremony Senior Groups Apparatus finals

== Medal winners ==
Event	Gold	Silver	Bronze
Team
Team	Italy; Senior Individual; Tara Dragas; Sofia Raffaeli; Alice Taglietti; Senior Group; Chiara Badii; Alexandra Naclerio; Serena Ottaviani; Laura Paris; Giulia Segatori; Sofia Sicignano	Ukraine; Senior Individual; Polina Karika; Taisiia Onofriichuk; Senior Group; Yelyzaveta Azza; Diana Baieva; Anastasiia Ikan; Valeriia Peremeta; Kira Shyrykina; Oleksandra Yushchak	Israel; Senior Individual; Daniela Munits; Lian Rona; Meital Maayam Sumkin; Senior Group; Maya Gamliel; Agam Gev; Arina Gvozdetskaia; Varvara Salenkova; Lian Suharevich; Kristina Eilon Ternovski
Senior Individual Finals
All-Around	Taisiia Onofriichuk; Ukraine	Stiliana Nikolova; Bulgaria	Darja Varfolomeev; Germany
Hoop	Stiliana Nikolova; Bulgaria	Sofia Raffaeli; Italy	Taisiia Onofriichuk; Ukraine
Ball	Stiliana Nikolova; Bulgaria	Anastasia Simakova; Germany	Meital Maayam Sumkin; Israel
Clubs	Stiliana Nikolova; Bulgaria	Taisiia Onofriichuk; Ukraine	Sofia Raffaeli; Italy
Ribbon	Darja Varfolomeev; Germany	Meital Maayam Sumkin; Israel	Taisiia Onofriichuk; Ukraine
Senior Group Finals
All-Around	Spain; Inés Bergua; Andrea Corral; Marina Cortelles; Andrea Fernández; Lucía Muñoz; Salma Solaun	Israel; Maya Gamliel; Agam Gev; Arina Gvozdetskaia; Varvara Salenkova; Lian Suharevich; Kristina Eilon Ternovski	Hungary; Julia Farkas; Fruzsina Grek; Mandula Virag Meszaros; Dalma Pesti; Dora Szabados; Monika Urban-Szabo
5 Ribbons	Spain; Inés Bergua; Andrea Corral; Marina Cortelles*; Andrea Fernández; Lucía Muñoz; Salma Solaun	France; Maëlys Laporte; Justine Lavit; Shana Loxton-Vernaton; Salome Lozano Leon; Naia Okasha; Margaux Sol*	Italy; Chiara Badii; Alexandra Naclerio; Serena Ottaviani*; Laura Paris; Giulia Segatori; Sofia Sicignano
3 Balls + 2 Hoops	Spain; Inés Bergua; Andrea Corral; Marina Cortelles; Andrea Fernández; Lucía Muñoz; Salma Solaun*	Ukraine; Yelyzaveta Azza; Diana Baieva; Anastasiia Ikan*; Valeriia Peremeta; Kira Shyrykina; Oleksandra Yushchak	Germany; Neele Arndt*; Melanie Dargel; Olivia Falk; Helena Ripken; Anna-Maria Shatokhin; Emilia Wickert
Junior Group Finals
All-Around	Ukraine; Ahata Bilenko; Marharyta Melnyk; Anastasiia Nikolenko; Taisiia Redka; Oleksandra Nikol Samoukina; Kateryna Shershen	Spain; Mónica de Juana; Paula Donoso; Noa Esplugues; Claudia Mariño; Cynthia Ortega	Italy; Flavia Cassano; Elisa Maria Comignani; Chiara Cortese; Virginia Galeazzi; Ginevra Pascarella; Elisabetta Valdifiori
5 Hoops	Italy; Flavia Cassano*; Elisa Maria Comignani; Chiara Cortese; Virginia Galeazzi; Ginevra Pascarella; Elisabetta Valdifiori	Poland; Natalia Idziniak; Maria Majkowska; Valeriia Pinska; Laura Tlaczala; Lea Turowska	Israel; Melani Malka; Sofia Prezhyn; Emilia Roitman; Avigail Shved; Keren Sobol; Taisiia Sokolenko
5 Pairs of Clubs	Ukraine; Ahata Bilenko; Marharyta Melnyk*; Anastasiia Nikolenko; Taisiia Redka; Oleksandra Nikol Samoukina; Kateryna Shershen	Israel; Melani Malka; Sofia Prezhyn; Emilia Roitman; Avigail Shved; Keren Sobol; Taisiia Sokolenko	Bulgaria; Raya Bozhilova; Anania Dimitrova; Elena Hristova; Yoana Moteva; Gabriela Traykova*; Ivayla Velkovska

* reserve gymnast

== Results ==
=== Senior ===
==== Individual All-Around ====
Rank	Gymnast	Nation	Hoop (rhythmic gymnastics)	Ball (rhythmic gymnastics)	Clubs (rhythmic gymnastics)	Ribbon (rhythmic gymnastics)	Total
1st place, gold medalist(s)	Taisiia Onofriichuk	Ukraine	29.950 (3)	28.600 (2)	29.950 (2)	29.300 (1)	117.800
2nd place, silver medalist(s)	Stiliana Nikolova	Bulgaria	30.100 (2)	28.850 (1)	29.550 (3)	28.200 (4)	116.700
3rd place, bronze medalist(s)	Darja Varfolomeev	Germany	28.350 (7)	27.850 (6)	30.450 (1)	28.500 (2)	115.150
4	Sofia Raffaeli	Italy	30.150 (1)	28.100 (3)	28.900 (5)	27.800 (8)	114.950
5	Tara Dragas	Italy	28.650 (4)	26.600	29.350 (4)	27.950 (5)	112.550
6	Liliana Lewinska	Poland	28.600 (5)	27.450 (10)	28.300 (7)	27.950 (6)	112.300
7	Vera Tugolukova	Cyprus	28.500 (6)	27.800 (7)	28.300 (8)	27.300	111.900
8	Daniela Munits	Israel	28.000	27.300	28.100 (10)	28.350 (3)	111.750
9	Anastasia Simakova	Germany	28.150 (9)	28.000 (4)	27.150	27.650 (10)	110.950
10	Polina Karika	Ukraine	28.000	26.600	28.100 (9)	27.250	109.950
11	Eva Brezalieva	Bulgaria	26.150	27.500 (9)	27.700	27.700 (9)	109.050
12	Lucía González	Spain	28.200 (8)	27.550 (8)	28.000	24.350	108.100
13	Hatice Gokce Emir	Turkey	27.750	25.450	27.850	26.200	107.250
14	Amalia Lica	Romania	28.050 (10)	26.400	26.600	25.850	106.900
15	Emilia Heichel	Poland	26.450	26.400	26.750	26.250	105.850
16	Maëna Millon	France	26.800	26.100	25.200	25.950	104.050
17	Andreea Verdes	Romania	26.500	26.450	23.800	26.950	103.700
18	Daniela Picó	Spain	27.350	24.550	26.850	24.850	103.600
19	Lily Ramonatxo	France	26.400	25.400	25.450	26.100	103.350
20	Fanni Pigniczki	Hungary	25.750	26.900	22.850	27.400	102.900
21	Meital Maayam Sumkin	Israel	16.250	27.850 (5)	28.900 (6)	27.950 (7)	100.950
22	Anette Vaher	Estonia	25.800	25.550	25.250	24.150	100.750
23	Lia Kallio	Finland	26.500	25.350	24.050	23.900	99.800
24	Maria Avgousti	Cyprus	25.550	25.150	22.850	24.200	97.750
25	Marfa Ekimova	United Kingdom	25.400	24.700	25.150	22.400	97.650

==== Hoop ====
Rank	Gymnast	Nation	D Score	E Score	A Score	Pen	Total
1st place, gold medalist(s)	Stiliana Nikolova	Bulgaria	13.900	8.200	8.200		30.300
2nd place, silver medalist(s)	Sofia Raffaeli	Italy	13.500	8.200	8.350		30.050
3rd place, bronze medalist(s)	Taisiia Onofriichuk	Ukraine	13.700	8.000	8.150		29.850
4	Meital Maayam Sumkin	Israel	13.400	7.850	8.500		29.750
5	Darja Varfolomeev	Germany	13.500	7.700	8.200		29.400
6	Eva Brezalieva	Bulgaria	13.200	7.850	8.050		29.100
7	Vera Tugolukova	Cyprus	13.200	7.700	8.100		29.000
8	Liliana Lewinska	Poland	13.000	7.850	8.050	0.050	28.850

==== Ball ====
Rank	Gymnast	Nation	D Score	E Score	A Score	Pen	Total
1st place, gold medalist(s)	Stiliana Nikolova	Bulgaria	13.300	8.100	8.400		29.800
2nd place, silver medalist(s)	Anastasia Simakova	Germany	12.800	7.900	8.000		28.700
3rd place, bronze medalist(s)	Meital Maayam Sumkin	Israel	12.300	7.900	8.400		28.600
4	Taisiia Onofriichuk	Ukraine	12.200	8.000	8.150		28.350
5	Sofia Raffaeli	Italy	11.800	8.050	8.300		28.150
6	Lucía González	Spain	12.300	7.850	8.000		28.150
7	Eva Brezalieva	Bulgaria	11.500	7.850	8.050		27.400
8	Vera Tugolukova	Cyprus	10.000	6.450	7.600	0.060	23.450

==== Clubs ====
Rank	Gymnast	Nation	D Score	E Score	A Score	Pen	Total
1st place, gold medalist(s)	Stiliana Nikolova	Bulgaria	14.000	8.050	8.350		30.400
2nd place, silver medalist(s)	Taisiia Onofriichuk	Ukraine	14.200	8.000	8.200		30.400
3rd place, bronze medalist(s)	Sofia Raffaeli	Italy	13.200	8.100	8.100		29.400
4	Polina Karika	Ukraine	12.500	8.150	7.950		28.600
5	Vera Tugolukova	Cyprus	12.300	7.300	8.050		27.650
6	Tara Dragas	Italy	12.100	7.350	7.800		27.250
7	Lada Pusch	Germany	12.500	7.050	7.600		27.150
8	Liliana Lewinska	Poland	11.200	7.400	7.750		26.350

==== Ribbon ====
Rank	Gymnast	Nation	D Score	E Score	A Score	Pen	Total
1st place, gold medalist(s)	Darja Varfolomeev	Germany	13.900	8.350	8.400		30.650
2nd place, silver medalist(s)	Meital Maayam Sumkin	Israel	13.200	8.000	8.350		29.550
3rd place, bronze medalist(s)	Taisiia Onofriichuk	Ukraine	13.200	8.000	8.300		29.500
4	Sofia Raffaeli	Italy	12.400	8.050	8.300		28.750
5	Tara Dragas	Italy	12.600	7.600	8.000	0.050	28.150
6	Vera Tugolukova	Cyprus	11.900	7.450	7.900		27.250
7	Liliana Lewinska	Poland	11.400	7.250	7.900		26.550
8	Amalia Lica	Romania	11.100	7.450	7.850	0.050	26.350

==== Groups All-Around ====
Rank	Nation	5	3 + 2	Total
1	Spain	26.100	27.700	53.800
2	Israel	23.200	26.300	49.500
3	Hungary	21.750	26.400	48.150
4	Estonia	23.350	24.450	47.800
5	Italy	25.600	20.800	46.400
6	Azerbaijan	19.750	25.800	45.550
7	Poland	23.250	22.300	45.550
8	Ukraine	19.450	25.550	45.000
9	France	23.350	20.650	44.000
10	Germany	19.850	23.350	43.200
11	Turkey	19.750	23.000	42.750
12	Greece	18.700	22.150	40.850
13	Lithuania	19.750	20.150	39.900
14	Czech Republic	17.300	22.350	39.650
15	Bulgaria	19.250	19.600	38.850
16	Georgia	19.500	18.400	37.900
17	Finland	20.550	15.550	36.100
18	Andorra	14.800	21.050	35.850
19	Serbia	13.200	17.750	30.950

==== 5 Ribbons ====
Rank	Nation	D score	A score	E score	Pen	Total
1st place, gold medalist(s)	Spain	12.200	7.200	5.900		25.300
2nd place, silver medalist(s)	France	11.500	6.950	6.200		24.650
3rd place, bronze medalist(s)	Italy	11.500	6.850	5.750	0.300	23.800
4	Israel	11.200	6.700	5.650		23.550
5	Estonia	11.300	6.550	5.600	0.600	22.850
6	Finland	10.700	6.250	5.450		22.400
7	Poland	9.400	5.400	4.500		19.300
8	Hungary	9.800	5.600	4.400	0.600	19.200

==== 3 Balls + 2 Hoops ====
Rank	Nation	D score	A score	E score	Pen	Total
1st place, gold medalist(s)	Spain	13.200	7.600	6.900		27.700
2nd place, silver medalist(s)	Ukraine	12.800	6.900	6.550		26.250
3rd place, bronze medalist(s)	Germany	12.200	6.800	6.350		25.350
4	Estonia	11.700	6.950	6.450	0.050	25.050
5	Israel	11.300	7.100	6.600		25.000
6	Hungary	11.700	7.100	5.500		24.300
7	Azerbaijan	10.800	6.800	6.400		24.000
8	Turkey	10.300	6.250	5.000		21.550

=== Junior ===
==== Groups All-Around ====
Rank	Nation	5	5	Total
1st place, gold medalist(s)	Ukraine	24.700	23.500	48.200
2nd place, silver medalist(s)	Spain	24.750	23.200	47.950
3rd place, bronze medalist(s)	Italy	24.100	23.350	47.450
4	Israel	22.650	23.900	46.550
5	Estonia	23.900	22.550	46.450
6	Bulgaria	21.300	24.300	45.600
7	Poland	23.400	22.100	45.500
8	Turkey	22.150	21.850	44.000
9	Hungary	22.100	21.250	43.350
10	Czech Republic	21.150	21.150	42.300
11	Germany	21.850	19.850	41.700
12	United Kingdom	20.950	20.550	41.500
13	Portugal	20.800	19.750	40.550
14	Azerbaijan	21.750	18.650	40.400
15	Slovakia	20.750	19.350	40.100
16	Finland	19.850	19.450	39.300
17	Greece	19.050	19.950	39.000
18	Norway	19.900	18.700	38.600
19	Georgia	20.150	14.950	35.100
20	Lithuania	17.900	16.350	34.250
21	Moldova	15.050	17.800	32.850
22	Latvia	16.600	15.700	32.300

==== 5 Hoops ====
Rank	Nation	D score	A score	E score	Pen	Total
1st place, gold medalist(s)	Italy	9.600	7.400	7.100		24.100
2nd place, silver medalist(s)	Poland	10.200	7.050	6.950	0.300	23.900
3rd place, bronze medalist(s)	Israel	10.100	7.100	6.250		23.450
4	Spain	9.100	7.350	6.850		23.300
5	Hungary	9.700	7.000	6.300		23.000
6	Estonia	9.500	6.850	5.950	0.050	22.250
7	Turkey	8.800	7.100	6.500	0.300	22.100
8	Ukraine	8.900	6.500	6.300	0.300	21.400

==== 5 Pairs of Clubs ====
Rank	Nation	D score	A score	E score	Pen	Total
1st place, gold medalist(s)	Ukraine	9.900	7.500	7.250		24.650
2nd place, silver medalist(s)	Israel	9.500	7.450	7.150		24.100
3rd place, bronze medalist(s)	Bulgaria	9.900	7.500	6.650		24.050
4	Estonia	9.500	7.350	7.100		23.950
5	Italy	9.200	7.550	7.150		23.900
6	Spain	9.000	7.300	6.950		23.250
7	Turkey	9.100	7.300	6.800		23.200
8	Poland	8.400	7.100	6.700		22.200

== Medal table ==
* Host nation (Estonia)

Rank	Nation	Gold	Silver	Bronze	Total
1	Ukraine	3	3	2	8
2	Bulgaria	3	1	1	5
3	Spain	3	1	0	4
4	Italy	2	1	3	6
5	Germany	1	1	2	4
6	Israel	0	3	3	6
7	France	0	1	0	1
7	Poland	0	1	0	1
9	Hungary	0	0	1	1
Totals (9 entries)		12	12	12	36
