= Rhythmic gymnastics at the 2026 Mediterranean Games – Women's individual all-around =

Women's individual all-around at the 2026 Mediterranean Games
- Venue: Palasport Campitelli
- Location: Grottaglie
- Dates: 25 – 26 August
- Competitors: 27 from 17 nations

The women's rhythmic individual all-around competition at the 2026 Mediterranean Games was held at the Palasport Campitelli in Grottaglie, Italy from 25 to 26 August.

== Competition format ==
The competition consisted of a qualification round and a final round. The top ten gymnasts in the qualification round advance to the final round. In each round, the gymnasts perform four routines (ball, hoop, clubs, and ribbon), with the scores added to give a total.

== Schedule ==
All times are Central European Summer Time (UTC+2)

Date	Time	Round
Tuesday, 25 August 2026	10:00	Qualification
Wednesday, 26 August 2026	15:00	Final

== Qualification ==
Rank	Name	Hoop (rhythmic gymnastics)	Ball (rhythmic gymnastics)	Clubs (rhythmic gymnastics)	Ribbon (rhythmic gymnastics)	Total	Notes
1	Daniela Picó (ESP)	27.600	21.900	28.400	26.950	82.950	Q
2	Hatice Gokce Emir (TUR)	27.450	25.500	27.650	26.150	81.250	Q
3	Alba Bautista (ESP)	27.900	26.150	24.450	26.800	80.850	Q
4	Margherita Fucci (ITA)	26.050	25.000	26.500	26.450	79.000	Q
5	Viola Sella (ITA)	25.250	25.500	27.200	26.150	78.850	Q
6	Maëna Millon (FRA)	26.000	23.750	26.200	25.500	77.700	Q
7	Alja Ponikvar (SLO)	26.250	20.000	25.450	25.550	77.250	Q
8	Yseult Zavagno (FRA)	26.200	23.350	25.900	24.350	76.450	Q
9	Maria Avgousti (CYP)	25.650	24.150	26.000	24.450	76.100	Q
10	Rita Araújo (POR)	25.600	20.450	25.850	24.550	76.000	Q
11	Farida Bahnas (EGY)	24.050	24.900	25.100	24.850	74.850	R1
12	Lina Heleika (EGY)	25.100	23.550	22.900	25.300	73.950	R2
13	Anastasia Maria Kagkalou (GRE)	21.850	22.300	26.100	24.000	72.400	
14	Panagiota Lytra (GRE)	24.950	22.500	23.250	23.850	72.050	
15	Damla Sel (TUR)	24.550	21.150	23.450	23.500	71.500	
16	Nina Dragović (MNE)	20.200	21.150	25.600	24.150	70.900	
17	Maša Nikolić (SRB)	24.450	17.850	20.200	23.100	67.750	
18	Maria Sokolova (CYP)	22.250	23.250	20.100	20.000	65.600	
19	Berta Miquel (AND)	23.000	20.350	21.700	20.650	65.350	
20	Dora Valant (SLO)	24.700	20.450	19.750	18.700	64.900	
21	Elissar Hanounik (SYR)	22.450	20.100	20.100	20.050	62.650	
22	Ilina Sokolovska (MKD)	18.150	18.700	18.950	17.700	55.800	
23	Luna Birjawi (LBN)	17.150	15.150	19.550	16.850	53.550	
24	Iva Benić (BIH)	19.050	16.950	17.500	16.200	53.500	
25	Seraphina Seropian (LBN)	17.600	14.700	18.300	16.700	52.600	
26	Jelena Davidović (BIH)	18.650	16.450	17.300	16.350	52.400	
27	Mariem Karray (TUN)	18.400	14.650	13.250	16.850	49.900	

== Final ==
Rank	Name	Hoop (rhythmic gymnastics)	Ball (rhythmic gymnastics)	Clubs (rhythmic gymnastics)	Ribbon (rhythmic gymnastics)	Total
1st place, gold medalist(s)	Hatice Gokce Emir (TUR)	27.000	25.350	28.050	26.450	106.850
2nd place, silver medalist(s)	Daniela Picó (ESP)	27.150	25.650	27.200	26.550	106.550
3rd place, bronze medalist(s)	Viola Sella (ITA)	28.050	26.050	25.650	25.950	105.700
4	Margherita Fucci (ITA)	27.350	26.450	26.350	25.100	104.300
5	Maëna Millon (FRA)	25.950	26.100	26.650	25.600	104.300
6	Alja Ponikvar (SLO)	27.150	24.050	26.450	25.400	103.050
7	Alba Bautista (ESP)	27.550	23.950	25.450	25.100	102.050
8	Yseult Zavagno (FRA)	25.350	24.500	26.350	24.250	100.450
9	Maria Avgousti (CYP)	25.200	21.000	26.050	24.750	97.000
10	Rita Araújo (POR)	22.900	24.500	23.950	22.800	94.150
