= Gioia Casali =

Sammarinese gymnast (born 2008)

- Born: 15 May 2008 (age 18) Borgo Maggiore

Gymnastics career
- Discipline: Rhythmic gymnastics
- Country represented: San Marino (2021-present)
- Club: Societa Sportiva Ginnastica San Marino
- Head coach: Monica Leardini
Medal record
Representing San Marino
Rhythmic Gymnastics
Games of the Small States of Europe
Bronze medal – third place	2025 Andorra	Team
Bronze medal – third place	2025 Andorra	Ball

Gioia Casali (born 15 May 2008) is a Sammarinese rhythmic gymnast. She represents San Marino in international competitions.

== Career ==
Casali made her international debut in December 2019, winning silver with hoop at the 20th Challenge Cup in Ljubljana. After the 2020 season was cut short due to the COVID-19 pandemic she was crowned national champion in September.

=== Junior ===
In 2021 she helped Societa Sportiva Ginnastica San Marino win a silver medal in the first stage of the Italian "serie c" with Camilla Rossi, Giulia Casali, Lucia Castiglioni, Annalisa Giovannini and Matilde Tamagnini, being 2nd overall at the end of the season. In October she won bronze with clubs at 33rd MTM Tournament.

Selected for the 2022 Mediterranean Games (Comegym) in Mersin, along Gloria Ambrogiani, Camilla Rossi, and Annalisa Giovannini, she was 11th with clubs.

In 2023 she debuted at the “Swirl and Twirl” tournament in Udine, winning bronze in the All-Around and with clubs as well as silver with hoop. Later that same month she helped her club win silver and gold in the first two stage of the Italian "serie c", conquering the promotion to "serie b" in April. In July she was selected for the Junior World Championships in Cluj-Napoca along Emma Fratti, finishing 50th with hoop and 32nd with clubs. In December she was 7th with both hoop and ball at the Comegym.

=== Senior ===
She became age eligible for senior competitions in 2024. Early in the year she took two bronze medals in the first two stages of the"serie b", after a fourth-place finish in March, Societa Sportiva Ginnastica San Marino was confirmed in the same league. In May she participated in her maiden European Championships in Budapest, taking 61st place in the All-Around, 57th with hoop, 71st with ball, 49th with clubs and 63rd with ribbon. The following month she took part in the World Cup in Milan, being 40th in the All-Around, 36th with hoop, 39th with ball, 40th with clubs and 43rd with ribbon.

In April 2025 her club won silver in the last stage of "serie b", thus maintaining their place in the league. The following month she competed in the World Cup in Portimão, being 44th in the All-Around, 46th with hoop, 29th with ball, 46th with clubs and 37th with ribbon. She then participated for the Games of the Small States of Europe held in Andorra, winning bronze in teams along Camilla Rossi and Emma Fratti, and with ball behind Maria Avgousti and Berta Miquel. In June she took part in the European Championships in Tallinn, being 63rd in the All-Around, 61st with hoop, 58th with ball, 72nd with clubs and 62nd with ribbon. At the World Cup stage in Milan she achieved 52nd place with hoop, 62nd with ball, 38th with clubs and 58th with ribbon. In August she was selected for her first World Championships in Rio de Janeiro, taking 66th place in the All-Around, 69th with hoop, 55th with ball, 55th with clubs and 83rd with ribbon.
