= Christina Ourania Riga =

Greek rhythmic gymnast

- Born: 18 February 2003 (age 23) Marousi, Greece

Gymnastics career
- Discipline: Rhythmic gymnastics
- Country represented: Greece (2017-)
- Head coach: Marina Fateeva
- Assistant coaches: Fotini Kotsopoulou, Sofia Aivathiadou
Medal record
Rhythmic gymnastics
Representing Greece
| Event | 1st | 2nd | 3rd |
|---|---|---|---|
| FIG World Cup | 1 | 4 | 2 |
| Total | 1 | 4 | 2 |

Christina Ourania Riga (born 18 February 2003) is a Greek rhythmic gymnast, member of the national senior team.

== Personal life ==
Christina got involved in rhythmic gymnastics at age three, her biggest dream is to compete at the Olympic Games.

== Career ==
In 2017 Riga was part of the Greek junior group that competed at the European Championships in Budapest, finishing 22nd in the All-Around.

She entered the rooster of the senior group in 2019 debuting at the World Cup in Athens, where the group won silver in the All-Around and with 3 ribbons and 2 balls as well as being 4th with 5 hoops. In April she competed at the World Cup in Sofia, getting another silver medal in the All-Around a gold with 3 ribbons and 2 balls. In early June she attended the Pesaro World Cup, finishing 10th in the All-Around. Two weeks later she competed in her first European Championships as a senior, taking 10th place in the team competition, 7th in the All-Around, 13th with 5 hoops and 7th with 3 ribbons and 2 balls. In September Christina represented Greece at the World Championships in Sofia along Elpida Englezou, Aikaterini Pagoulatou, Kalomoira Karoki, Marieta Topollai and the two individuals Panagiota Lytra and Maria Dervisi, ending 10th in the All-Around, 11th with 5 hoops and 9th with 3 ribbons and 2 balls.

In 2023 at the first World Cup of the season in Athens the group was 7th in the All-Around, 4th with 5 hoops and won bronze with 3 ribbons + 2 balls. In Sofia the group won bronze with 5 hoops and silver with 3 ribbons + 2 balls.
