= Elpida Englezou =

Greek rhythmic gymnast

- Born: 14 November 2006 (age 19) Athens, Greece

Gymnastics career
- Discipline: Rhythmic gymnastics
- Country represented: Greece (2021-)
- Head coach: Marina Fateeva
- Assistant coaches: Fotini Kotsopoulou, Sofia Aivathiadou
Medal record
Rhythmic gymnastics
Representing Greece
Event	1st	2nd	3rd
FIG World Cup	1	4	2
Total	1	4	2

Elpida Englezou (born 14 November 2006) is a Greek rhythmic gymnast, member of the national senior team.

== Career ==
Englezou was part of the junior group that competed at the 2021 European Championships in Varna, along Eftychia Dodekatou, Rafailia Fourli, Eirini Chrysovalanto Konisti, Marieta Topollai and Ioanna Triantafyllopoulou, finishing 11th in the All-Around.

In 2022 she entered the rooster of the Greek senior team debuting at the World Cup in Athens, where the group won silver in the All-Around and with 3 ribbons and 2 balls as well as being 4th with 5 hoops. In April she competed at the World Cup in Sofia, getting another silver medal in the All-Around a gold with 3 ribbons and 2 balls. In early June she attended the Pesaro World Cup, finishing 10th in the All-Around. Two weeks later she competed in her first European Championships as a senior, taking 10th place in the team competition, 7th in the All-Around, 13th with 5 hoops and 7th with 3 ribbons and 2 balls. In September she represented Greece at the World Championships in Sofia along Kalomoira Karoki, Aikaterini Pagoulatou, Christina Ourania Riga, Marieta Topollai and the two individuals Panagiota Lytra and Maria Dervisi, ending 10th in the All-Around, 11th with 5 hoops and 9th with 3 ribbons and 2 balls.

In 2023 at the first World Cup of the season in Athens the group was 7th in the All-Around, 4th with 5 hoops and won bronze with 3 ribbons + 2 balls. In Sofia the group won bronze with 5 hoops and silver with 3 ribbons + 2 balls.
