= Marieta Topollai =

Greek rhythmic gymnast (born 2006)

- Born: 30 June 2006 (age 20) Argostoli, Greece

Gymnastics career
- Discipline: Rhythmic gymnastics
- Country represented: Greece (2021–present)
- Head coach: Marina Fateeva
- Assistant coaches: Fotini Kotsopoulou, Sofia Aivathiadou
Medal record
Rhythmic gymnastics
Representing Greece
Event	1st	2nd	3rd
FIG World Cup	1	4	2
Total	1	4	2

Marieta Topollai (born 30 June 2006) is a Greek rhythmic gymnast, member of the national senior team.

== Career ==
Topollai took up the sport at age six. She was part of the junior group that competed at the 2021 European Championships in Varna, along Eftychia Dodekatou, Rafailia Fourli, Eirini Chrysovalanto Konisti, Elpida Englezou and Ioanna Triantafyllopoulou, finishing 11th in the All-Around.

In 2022, she entered the rooster of the Greek senior team debuting at the World Cup in Athens, where the group won silver in the All-Around and with 3 ribbons and 2 balls as well as being 4th with 5 hoops. In April, she competed at the World Cup in Sofia, getting another silver medal in the All-Around a gold with 3 ribbons and 2 balls. In early June she attended the Pesaro World Cup, finishing 10th in the All-Around. Two weeks later, she competed in her first European Championships as a senior, taking 10th place in the team competition, 7th in the All-Around, 13th with 5 hoops and 7th with 3 ribbons and 2 balls. In September, Marieta represented Greece at the World Championships in Sofia along Kalomoira Karoki, Aikaterini Pagoulatou, Christina Ourania Riga, Elpida Englezou and the two individuals Panagiota Lytra and Maria Dervisi, ending 10th in the All-Around, 11th with 5 hoops and 9th with 3 ribbons and 2 balls.

In 2023 at the first World Cup of the season in Athens the group was 7th in the All-Around, 4th with 5 hoops and won bronze with 3 ribbons + 2 balls. In Sofia the group won bronze with 5 hoops and silver with 3 ribbons + 2 balls.
