= Aikaterini Pagoulatou =

Greek rhythmic gymnast

- Born: 26 September 2003 (age 22) Marousi, Greece

Gymnastics career
- Discipline: Rhythmic gymnastics
- Country represented: Greece (2019-)
- Head coach: Marina Fateeva
- Assistant coaches: Fotini Kotsopoulou, Sofia Aivathiadou
Medal record
Rhythmic gymnastics
Representing Greece
Event	1st	2nd	3rd
FIG World Cup	1	3	0
Total	1	3	0

Aikaterini Pagoulatou (born 26 September 2003) is a Greek rhythmic gymnast, member of the national group.

== Career ==
Pagoulatou took up rhythmic gymnastics in 2007 at the GAS Holargos club in Greece.

In 2019 she entered the rooster of the Greek senior team getting to compete at the World Championships in Baku, the group finished 22nd in the All-Around and in both 5 balls and 3 hoops and 4 clubs.

In 2022 she debuted at the World Cup in Athens, where the group won silver in the All-Around and with 3 ribbons and 2 balls as well as being 4th with 5 hoops. In April she competed at the World Cup in Sofia, getting another silver medal in the All-Around a gold with 3 ribbons and 2 balls. In early June she attended the Pesaro World Cup, finishing 10th in the All-Around. Two weeks later she competed in her first European Championships as a senior, taking 10th place in the team competition, 7th in the All-Around, 13th with 5 hoops and 7th with 3 ribbons and 2 balls. In September she represented Greece at the World Championships in Sofia along Elpida Englezou, Kalomoira Karoki, Christina Ourania Riga, Marieta Topollai and the two individuals Panagiota Lytra and Maria Dervisi, ending 10th in the All-Around, 11th with 5 hoops and 9th with 3 ribbons and 2 balls.
