= Camilla Rossi =

Sammarinese gymnast (born 2007)

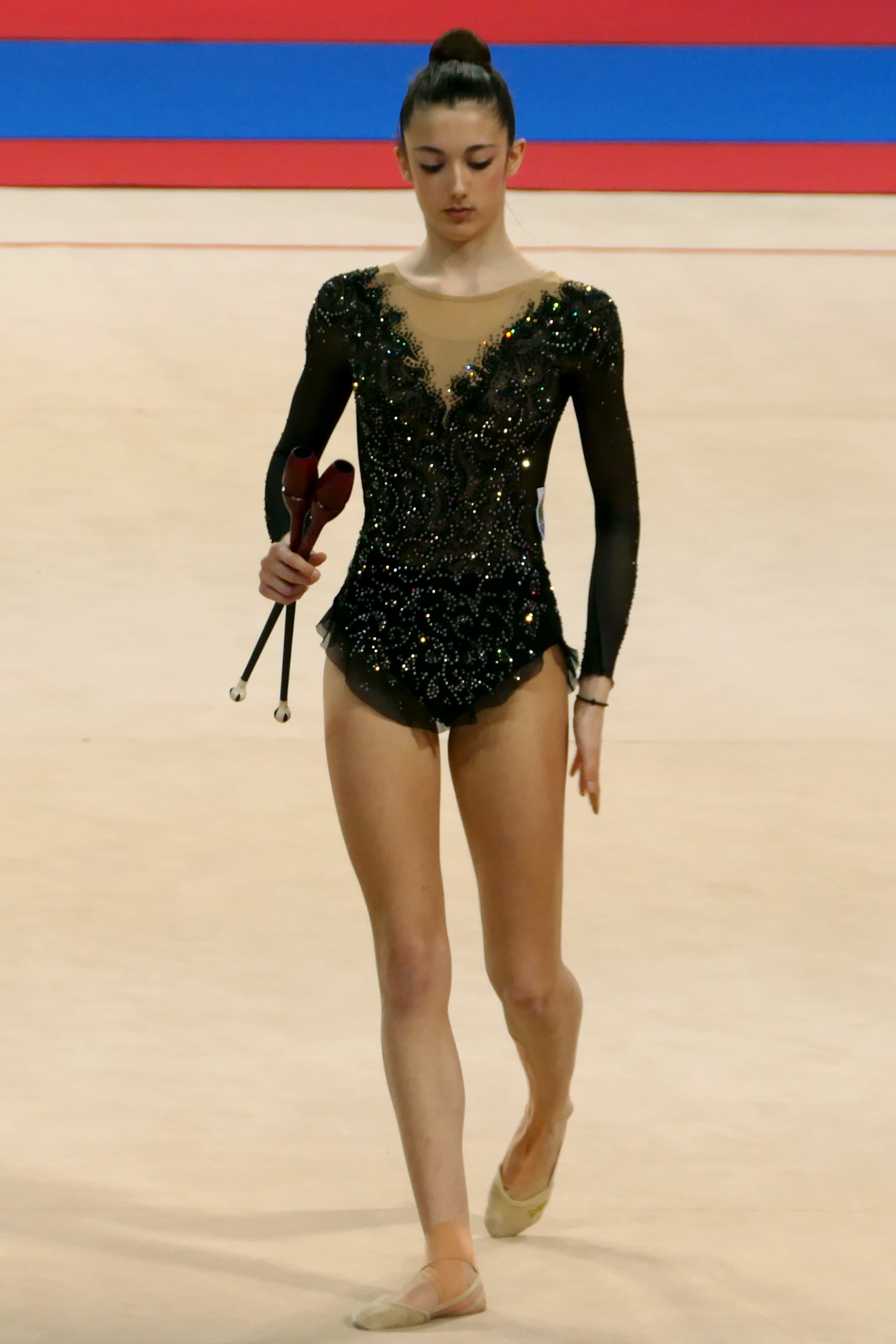

Personal information
- Born: 2007 (age 18–19) Borgo Maggiore

Gymnastics career
- Discipline: Rhythmic gymnastics
- Country represented: San Marino (2020-present)
- Club: Societa Sportiva Ginnastica San Marino
- Head coach: Monica Leardini
Medal record
Representing San Marino
Rhythmic Gymnastics
Games of the Small States of Europe
Bronze medal – third place	2025 Andorra	Team

Camilla Rossi (born 2007) is a Sammarinese rhythmic gymnast. She represents San Marino in international competitions.

== Career ==
In November 2016 Rossi won bronze in the Sammarinese Championships among gymnasts born in 2007. The following year she was crowned national champion among girls born in 2007–2009.

She made her international debut in May 2018 at the Luxembourg Trophy, taking 15th place among pre juniors. In November she won bronze with ball at the 20th Challenge Cup in Ljubljana, later that month she took gold among pre juniors at nationals.

=== Junior ===
Her first season as a junior gymnast was cut short due to the COVID-19 pandemic, in October she was 16th at the San Marino Cup and in November conquered 5th place in the C league of the Italian Club Championships with her team.

In 2021 she helped Societa Sportiva Ginnastica San Marino win a silver medal in the first stage of the Italian "serie c" with Gioia Casali, Giulia Casali, Lucia Castiglioni, Annalisa Giovannini and Matilde Tamagnini, being 2nd overall at the end of the season.

She was selected for the 2022 Mediterranean Games (Comegym) in Mersin along Gloria Ambrogiani, Gioia Casali and Annalisa Giovannini, being 9th with ribbon. A week later she competed in the European Championships in Tel Aviv, being 30th in teams, 31st with hoop, 32nd with clubs and 34th with ribbon. In October she qualified for the final of the Italian national championships.

=== Senior ===
She became age eligible for senior competitions in 2023. In the early months on the year she helped her club win silver and gold in the first two stage of the Italian "serie c", conquering the promotion to "serie b" in April. In May she was selected for the European Championships in Baku, being 55th in the All-Around, 43rd with hoop, 67th with ball, 69th with clubs and 49th with ribbon. In July she made her World Cup debut in Milan, taking 52nd place in the All-Around, 47th with hoop, 49th with ball, 56th with clubs and 48th with ribbon.

In early 2024 she took two bronze medals in the first two stages of the"serie b", after a fourth-place finish in March, Societa Sportiva Ginnastica San Marino was confirmed in the same league. The following month she took part in the World Cup in Sofia where she was 55th in the All-Around, 54th with hoop, 55th with ball, 54th with clubs and 46th with ribbon. In May she participated in the European Championships in Budapest, taking 65th place overall, 60th with hoop, 70th with ball, 69th with clubs and 70th with ribbon. In July she was called up for the World Challenge Cup in Cluj-Napoca, finishing 39th overall, 37th with hoop, 40th with ball, 31st with clubs and 39th with ribbon. At the San Marino Cup she won silver in the ribbon final.

In April 2025 her club won silver in the last stage of "serie b", thus maintaining their place in the league. The following month she competed in the World Cup in Portimão, being 40th in the All-Around, 40th with hoop, 40th with ball, 33rd with clubs and 41st with ribbon. She was then selected for the Games of the Small States of Europe held in Andorra, winning bronze in teams along Gioia Casali and Emma Fratti. In June she took part in the European Championships in Tallinn, being 55th in the All-Around, 26th with hoop, 61st with ball, 68th with clubs and 57th with ribbon. At the World Cup stage in Milan she achieved 55th place with hoop, 43rd with ball, 63rd with clubs and 68th with ribbon.
