= World Gymnaestrada 2019 =

International gymnastics festival, held in Dornbirn, Austria

16th World Gymnaestrada 2019 Dornbirn
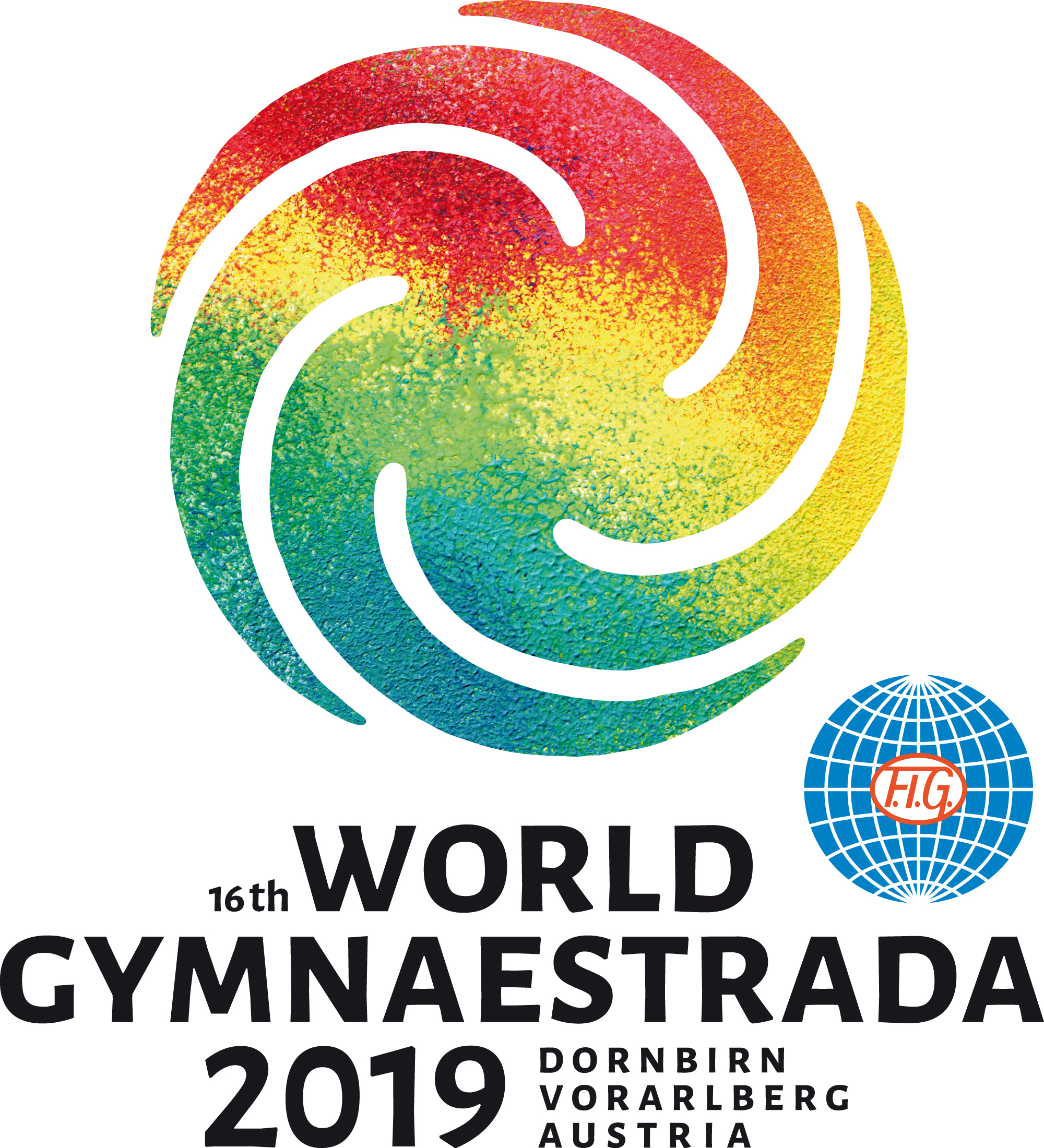
- Genre: Gymnastics
- Begins: July 7, 2019
- Ends: July 13, 2019
- Venue: Dornbirn, Vorarlberg (Austria)
- Country: Austria
- Participants: 18,000

The World Gymnaestrada 2019 (officially: 16th World Gymnaestrada 2019 Dornbirn) took place from July 7 to July 13, 2019 in Dornbirn in Vorarlberg (Austria). It was the second time that the World Gymnaestrada was held in Dornbirn. The event brought over 18,000 athletes from 66 federations and hundreds of guests to Vorarlberg.

== Venues ==
The venues for the World Gymnaestrada 2019 were spread throughout the Vorarlberg Rhine Valley. The large group performances were held in Bregenz next to the Lake of Constance. The opening and the closing events as well as the Dornbirn Special were held in the Birkenwiese Stadium in Dornbirn. The Trade Exhibition Centre Dornbirn was used for the group performances and almost all events in the evening. Moreover, there were eight open-air stages in the centres of different towns and villages.

About 5,000 athletes from 20 nations participated in the closing event in the Birkenwiese Stadium on July 13, 2019.

== Organisation ==
The participating countries were housed in so-called "National Villages", meaning that all participants from the same country were accommodated in the same town in Vorarlberg.

== Goals ==
The World Gymnaestrada aims to promote the value and versatility of general gymnastics around the world and arouse people's interest in exercise and sports activities. General gymnastics brings together gymnasts from different cultural backgrounds to contribute to a better understanding between peoples. In addition, it aims to promote health, fitness and global solidarity.
