= 2025 Games of the Small States of Europe =

Multi-sport event in Andorra

XX Games of the Small States of Europe XX Jocs dels Petits Estats d'Europa
- Host city: Andorra la Vella
- Country: Andorra
- Nations: 9
- Athletes: 800+
- Events: 160 in 14 sports
- Opening: 27 May 2025
- Closing: 31 May 2025
- Opened by: Co-Prince Joan Enric Vives i Sicília
- Main venue: Estadi Nacional
- Website: Official Website

The 2025 Games of the Small States of Europe, also known as the XX Games of the Small States of Europe, was a sporting event held in Andorra la Vella, Andorra from 27 May to 31 May 2025. Andorra previously hosted the 1991 and 2005 editions of the Games.

== Overview and participation ==
The 2025 edition of the Games of the Small States of Europe took place in May 2025. Andorra was set to host the 2021 edition of the games until its postponement due to concerns over COVID-19, and was rescheduled for 2025. More than 800 athletes from 9 countries competed.

== Games ==
=== Participating teams ===
The following countries participated:

- Andorra (details)
- Cyprus (details)
- Iceland (details)
- Liechtenstein (details)
- Luxembourg (details)
- Malta (details)
- Monaco (details)
- Montenegro (details)
- San Marino (details)

=== Sports ===
The following competitions took place:

2025 Games of the Small States of Europe Sports Programme
- Artistic swimming
- Athletics
- Basketball
- Beach volleyball
- Cycling
- Gymnastics
- Judo
- Karate
- Rugby sevens
- Shooting
- Swimming
- Table tennis
- Tennis
- Volleyball

== Medal table ==
* Host nation (Andorra)

Rank	Nation	Gold	Silver	Bronze	Total
1	Cyprus	36	30	42	108
2	Luxembourg	32	27	27	86
3	Iceland	26	22	26	74
4	Monaco	16	13	15	44
5	Malta	13	24	19	56
6	Andorra*	13	11	14	38
7	Montenegro	12	13	11	36
8	San Marino	8	10	13	31
9	Liechtenstein	4	6	8	18
Totals (9 entries)		160	156	175	491

== Medalists ==
=== Artistic swimming ===
Event	Gold	Silver	Bronze
Women's solo technical routine	Jasmine Verbena; San Marino	Zea Montfort; Malta	Ana Culic; Malta
Women's solo free routine	Jasmine Verbena; San Marino	Zea Montfort; Malta	Thea Grima Buttigieg; Malta
Women's duet technical routine	Malta; Ana Culic; Thea Grima Buttigieg	Andorra; Zoe Palau Alcaide; Jasmine Serrano Steksova	Liechtenstein; Kira Beck; Aurora Notaro
Women's duet free routine	Malta; Ana Culic; Thea Grima Buttigieg	Andorra; Mariona Casas Montejo; Aran van den E. Sanabre	Liechtenstein; Kira Beck; Aurora Notaro

=== Basketball ===
Event	Gold	Silver	Bronze
Women's 5×5	Montenegro; Marija Baošić; Maja Bigović; Milena Bigović; Jelena Bulajić; Nikolina Ilić; Milica Jovanović; Bojana Kovačević; Marija Leković; Jovana Pašić; Zorana Radonjić; Jovana Savković; Sofija Živaljević	Luxembourg; Joy Baum; Charlie Bidinger; Faith Etute; Joyce Etute; Laurie Irthum; Jovana Jakšić; Dionne Madjo; Magaly Meynadier; Svenia Nürenberg; Jo Oly; Anne Simon; Esmeralda Skrijelj	Cyprus; Veatriki Akathiotou; Emelia Georgiou; Maria Konstantinou; Ioanna Kyprianou; Eleni Oikonomidou; Marissa Ariella Pangalos; Despina Papaioannou; Eleni Pilakouta; Tijana Raca; Sofia Stylianidi; Kyriaki Taylor; Styliana Velinova Chenaklieva
Men's 3×3	Cyprus; Marios Georgiou; Victor Ieronymides; Kyprianos Ioannis Maragkos; Panagiotis Markou	Andorra; Alexis Bartolomé Frases; Jordi Fernández Vilarrubla; Oriol Fernández Vilarrubla; Daniel Mofreita Cabeza	not awarded
Women's 3×3	Luxembourg; Michelle Dittgen; Mikayla Ferenz; Liz Irthum; Bridget Yoerger	Malta; Stephanie de Martino; Danika Galea; Kristy Galea; Amber Melgoza	Monaco; Jennifer Crocioni; Kimsy Demontoux; Lucie Laroche; Lala Wane

=== Beach volleyball ===
Event	Gold	Silver	Bronze
Men	Monaco; Pascal Ferry; Pierre Barré-Laffay	Cyprus; Charalampos Zorbis; Georgios Chrysostomou	Andorra; Xavier Folguera; Abel Bernal
Women	Monaco; Marion Augé; Victoria Béguelin	Luxembourg; Rebekka Klerf; Eline Delcourt	Andorra; Zeynep Ozenay; Andrea da Silva

=== Cycling ===
Mountain biking

Event	Gold	Silver	Bronze
Men's cross-country	Romano Püntener; Liechtenstein	Andreas Miltiadis; Cyprus	Felix Sprenger; Liechtenstein
Men's team cross-country	Cyprus; Christodoulos Achas; Georgios Kouzis; Andreas Miltiadis	Liechtenstein; Flavio Knaus; Romano Püntener; Felix Sprenger	Andorra; Xavier Jové; Oriol Pí; Roger Turné
Women's cross-country	Ekaterina Kovalchuk; Cyprus	Liv Wenzel; Luxembourg	Styliana Camelari; Cyprus
Women's team cross-country	Cyprus; Styliana Camelari; Constantina Georgiou; Ekaterina Kovalchuk	not awarded	not awarded

Road cycling

Event	Gold	Silver	Bronze
Men's time trial	Andreas Miltiadis; Cyprus	Alex Kirsch; Luxembourg	Mats Wenzel; Luxembourg
Men's road race	Mats Wenzel; Luxembourg	Alex Kirsch; Luxembourg	Kevin Velasquez; Monaco
Men's team road race	Luxembourg; Loïc Bettendorff; Tim Diederich; Alex Kirsch; Tom Paquet; Mats Wenzel	Cyprus; Christodoulos Achas; Georgios Kouzis; Andreas Miltiadis; Lampros Athanasiou; Konstantinos Pavlides; Bogdan Zabelinskiy	Malta; Daniel Bonello; Aiden Buttigieg; John Camilleri; Bernard Galea; Andrea Mifsud; Jacob Schembri
Women's time trial	Marie Schreiber; Luxembourg	Nina Berton; Luxembourg	Hafdís Sigurðardóttir; Iceland
Women's road race	Marie Schreiber; Luxembourg	shared gold	Valentina Venerucci; San Marino
Women's road race	Nina Berton; Luxembourg	shared gold	Valentina Venerucci; San Marino
Women's team road race	Luxembourg; Liv Wenzel; Layla Barthels; Maïté Barthels; Nina Berton; Marie Schreiber	Cyprus; Styliana Camelari; Constantina Georgiou; Ekaterina Kovalchuk; Demetra Koukouma; Eleni Koukouma; Alexandra Safiri	Andorra; Anna Albalat; Raquel Balboa; Laia Sebastià

=== Gymnastics ===
Men's artistic gymnastics

Event	Gold	Silver	Bronze
Team all-around	Cyprus; Georgios Angonas; Michalis Chari; Michalis Isaias; Kyriakos Markidis; Neofytos Savva	Monaco; Romain Chapelle; Kevin Crovetto; Lilian Piotte; Loris Racca; Hugo Villeneuve	Luxembourg; Hugo Gaspar; Yan Kies; Ben Mangen
Individual all-around	Georgios Angonas; Cyprus	Michalis Isaias; Cyprus	Hugo Villeneuve; Monaco
Floor	Jónas Ingi Þórisson; Iceland	Ben Mangen; Luxembourg	Kyriakos Markidis; Cyprus
Horizontal bar	Georgios Angonas; Cyprus	Kevin Crovetto; Monaco	Ben Mangen; Luxembourg
Parallel bars	Georgios Angonas; Cyprus	Michalis Isaias; Cyprus	Lilian Piotte; Monaco
Pommel horse	Hugo Villeneuve; Monaco	Lilian Piotte; Monaco	Jónas Ingi Þórisson; Iceland
Rings	Michalis Chari; Cyprus	Neofytos Savva; Cyprus	Jón Sigurður Gunnarsson; Iceland
Vault	Kyriakos Markidis; Cyprus	Georgios Angonas; Cyprus	Yan Kies; Luxembourg

Women's artistic gymnastics

Event	Gold	Silver	Bronze
Team all-around	Malta; Philippa Busuttil; Lyana Curmi Inguanez; Janet Galea; Julia Galea; Sophie St John	Iceland; Nanna Guðmundsdóttir; Margrét Lea Kristinsdóttir; Kristjana Ósk Ólafsdóttir; Rakel Sara Pétursdóttir; Þóranna Sveinsdóttir	Luxembourg; Chiara Castellucci; Alicia Hidaya Donneger; Zofia-Kalina Kopczynski; Valentina Marochi
Individual all-around	Rebecca Casula; Monaco	Sophie St John; Malta	Philippa Busuttil; Malta
Balance beam	Sophie St John; Malta	Valentina Marochi; Luxembourg	Margrét Lea Kristinsdóttir; Iceland
Floor	Nanna Guðmundsdóttir; Iceland	Julia Galea; Malta	Sophie St John; Malta
Uneven bars	Þóranna Sveinsdóttir; Iceland	Rebecca Casula; Monaco	Zofia-Kalina Kopczynski; Luxembourg
Vault	Sophie St John; Malta	Rakel Sara Pétursdóttir; Iceland	Eleana Panagiotou; Cyprus
Vault	Sophie St John; Malta	Rakel Sara Pétursdóttir; Iceland	Chiara Castellucci; Luxembourg

Women's rhythmic gymnastics

Event	Gold	Silver	Bronze
Team all-around	Cyprus; Maria Avgousti; Mikaela Eleftheriou; Nika Khodareva	Montenegro; Nina Dragović; Andela Vuković	San Marino; Gioia Casali; Emma Fratti; Camilla Rossi
Individual all-around	Maria Avgousti; Cyprus	Berta Miquel; Andorra	Andela Vuković; Montenegro
Ball	Maria Avgousti; Cyprus	Berta Miquel; Andorra	Gioia Casali; San Marino
Clubs	Maria Avgousti; Cyprus	Nina Dragović; Montenegro	Andela Vuković; Montenegro
Hoop	Maria Avgousti; Cyprus	Nina Dragović; Montenegro	Elena Meysembourg; Luxembourg
Ribbon	Maria Avgousti; Cyprus	Berta Miquel; Andorra	Andela Vuković; Montenegro

=== Judo ===
Event	Gold	Silver	Bronze
Men's 66 kg	Emil Sinanović; Montenegro	Abdesalem Khiri; Monaco	Georgios Kalaitsidis; Cyprus
Men's 66 kg	Emil Sinanović; Montenegro	Abdesalem Khiri; Monaco	Manuel Tischhauser; Liechtenstein
Men's 73 kg	Kyprianos Andreou; Cyprus	Jusuf Nurković; Montenegro	Kevin Nunes Dos Santos; Luxembourg
Men's 73 kg	Kyprianos Andreou; Cyprus	Jusuf Nurković; Montenegro	Marc Reig Arnau; Andorra
Men's 81 kg	Jahja Nurković; Montenegro	Odysseas Georgakis; Cyprus	Marc-Elie Gnamien; Monaco
Men's 81 kg	Jahja Nurković; Montenegro	Odysseas Georgakis; Cyprus	Petros Kesov; Cyprus
Men's 90 kg	Aðalsteinn Björnsson; Iceland	Novo Raičević; Montenegro	Theocharis Karatsaousidis; Cyprus
Men's 100 kg	Aristos Michael; Cyprus	Andrija Martinović; Montenegro	David Büchel; Liechtenstein
Men's 100 kg	Aristos Michael; Cyprus	Andrija Martinović; Montenegro	Alexandros Patiniotis; Cyprus
Men's +100 kg	Marvin Gadeau; Monaco	Slobodan Vukić; Montenegro	not awarded
Men's team	Monaco; David Buliga; Marvin Gadeau; Marc-Elie Gnamien; Abdesalem Khiri; Louis Lallau; Matthieu Pettiti	Montenegro; Edvin Čivović; Andrija Martinović; Jahja Nurković; Jusuf Nurković; Novo Raičević; Emil Sinanović; Slobodan Vukić	Cyprus; Kyprianos Andreou; Georgios Kalaitsidis; Theocharis Karatsaousidis; Petros Kesov; Aristos Michael
Men's team	Monaco; David Buliga; Marvin Gadeau; Marc-Elie Gnamien; Abdesalem Khiri; Louis Lallau; Matthieu Pettiti	Montenegro; Edvin Čivović; Andrija Martinović; Jahja Nurković; Jusuf Nurković; Novo Raičević; Emil Sinanović; Slobodan Vukić	Liechtenstein; Dario Alfonso; Manuel Bicker; David Büchel; Tristan Frei; Gabriel Meier; Fabian Tischhauser; Manuel Tischhauser
Women's 52 kg	Yamina Allag; Monaco	Carla Tavares Fernandes; Luxembourg	Lena Schmit; Luxembourg
Women's 52 kg	Yamina Allag; Monaco	Carla Tavares Fernandes; Luxembourg	Ena Šćepanović; Montenegro
Women's 57 kg	Marina Azinou; Cyprus	Tamara Gardašević; Montenegro	Lea Wyss; Liechtenstein
Women's 63 kg	Anetta Mosr; Luxembourg	Rania Drid; Monaco	Ivana Sunjevic; Montenegro
Women's 63 kg	Anetta Mosr; Luxembourg	Rania Drid; Monaco	Helena Bjarnadóttir; Iceland
Women's 70 kg	Omaïraa Aubry; Monaco	Mareen Hollenstein; Liechtenstein	Lia Povedano Ruiz; Andorra
Women's 70 kg	Omaïraa Aubry; Monaco	Mareen Hollenstein; Liechtenstein	Diana Dimitriou; Cyprus
Women's team	Monaco; Yamina Allag; Omaïraa Aubry; Rania Drid	Liechtenstein; Mareen Hollenstein; Lea Wyss	Iceland; Helena Bjarnadóttir; Weronika Komendera; Eyja Viborg
Women's team	Monaco; Yamina Allag; Omaïraa Aubry; Rania Drid	Liechtenstein; Mareen Hollenstein; Lea Wyss	Luxembourg; Darlene Donfack; Anetta Mosr; Chloé Schillings; Lena Schmit; Lora Schroller; Carla Tavares Fernandes

=== Karate ===
Event	Gold	Silver	Bronze
Men's kata	Silvio Moreira; Andorra	Lucas Chaffort; Luxembourg	Þórður Jökull Henrysson; Iceland
Men's kata	Silvio Moreira; Andorra	Lucas Chaffort; Luxembourg	Kenan Nikočević; Montenegro
Women's kata	Jessica Vella; Malta	Mila Mraković; Montenegro	Marie Ubiergo; Andorra
Women's kata	Jessica Vella; Malta	Mila Mraković; Montenegro	Aileen Sprenger; Liechtenstein
Men's kumite 60 kg	Balša Vojinović; Montenegro	Andreas Gavriel; Cyprus	not awarded
Men's kumite 67 kg	Jordan Sibille; Luxembourg	Markos Zigkas Tsangaras; Cyprus	not awarded
Men's kumite 75 kg	Lazar Jovović; Montenegro	Alex Michael; Cyprus	Heorhii Denysov; Malta
Men's kumite 84 kg	Luke Galea; Malta	Tiago Serra Rodrigues; Luxembourg	Demetris Demetriades; Cyprus
Men's kumite +84 kg	Nemanja Jovović; Montenegro	Emanuele Magnelli; San Marino	Mathaios Stylianou; Cyprus
Men's kumite +84 kg	Nemanja Jovović; Montenegro	Emanuele Magnelli; San Marino	Halil Ibrahim Koska; Malta
Women's kumite 50 kg	Paula González; Andorra	not awarded	not awarded
Women's kumite 55 kg	Jennifer Warling; Luxembourg	Helena Backović; Montenegro	Maria Kyprianou; Cyprus
Women's kumite 61 kg	Eydís Friðriksdóttir; Iceland	Nada Boričić; Montenegro	Anthia Stylianou; Cyprus
Women's kumite 68 kg	Pola Giorgetti; Luxembourg	Stella Sprenger; Liechtenstein	Jovana Stojanović; Montenegro

=== Rugby sevens ===
Event	Gold	Silver	Bronze
Men	Monaco; Sebastien Baldacchino; Hugo Bartnik; Dorian Danthez; Mark Durando; Clément Fabre; Timotéo Louppe; Andrea Minioni; Tristan Nardi; Maxence Picardet; Romain Roccia; Archie Russel; Ioan Tolosano	Andorra; Cristian Abarca; Josep Arasanz Avila; Adrià Bonell Navarro; Galdric Calvet; Adrià Calvó Bellocq; Samuel Sacha Franken; Ian Granyena Pujal; Valentin Hoxha; Leon Laguerre Poeydemenge; Nil Tomé Pons; Thibaut Trapé Salomon; Daniel Wallis Downham	Malta; Dimitrije Avramović; Brendan Dalton; Christopher Dudman; Zarrin Galea; Josh Gatt; Kyle Gauci; Brooklyn Jesse Hardaker; Robert Holloway; Thomas Holloway; Adam Kelly; Cameron Sultana; Jethro Zammit Randich

=== Shooting ===
Event	Gold	Silver	Bronze
Men's 10 m air pistol	Jón Þór Sigurðsson; Iceland	Ivar Ragnarsson; Iceland	Rafail Dimitriou; Cyprus
Men's 10 m air rifle	Achilleas Sophocleous; Cyprus	Miloš Božović; Montenegro	Luca Klein; Luxembourg
Men's trap	Gian Marco Berti; San Marino	Nikolas Kyriakou; Cyprus	Gianluca Chetcuti; Malta
Women's 10 m air pistol	Nevena Šaranović; Montenegro	Constantina Pratsi; Cyprus	Christiana Georgiou; Cyprus
Women's 10 m air rifle	Leonie Mautz; Liechtenstein	Isaure Goffette; Luxembourg	Kristina Popović; Montenegro
Women's trap	Alessandra Perilli; San Marino	Annita Koukkoulli; Cyprus	Georgia Konstantinidou; Cyprus

=== Swimming ===
Men

Event	Gold	Silver	Bronze
50 m freestyle	Issei Kim; Monaco	Ralph Daleiden Ciuferri; Luxembourg	Julien Henx; Luxembourg
100 m freestyle	Ralph Daleiden Ciuferri; Luxembourg	Matteo Oppioli; San Marino	Gabriel Crassard; Monaco
200 m freestyle	Matteo Oppioli; San Marino	Gabriel Crassard; Monaco	Ýmir Chatenay Sölvason; Iceland
400 m freestyle	Kevin Teixeira; Andorra	Loris Bianchi; San Marino	Matteo Oppioli; San Marino
800 m freestyle	Kevin Teixeira; Andorra	Esteban Faure; Monaco	Loris Bianchi; San Marino
1500 m freestyle	Kevin Teixeira; Andorra	Raphaël Sirour; Monaco	Esteban Faure; Monaco
50 m backstroke	Rufus Bernhardt; Liechtenstein	Ralph Daleiden Ciuferri; Luxembourg	Ladislas Salczer; Monaco
100 m backstroke	Rufus Bernhardt; Liechtenstein	Ralph Daleiden Ciuferri; Luxembourg	Guðmundur Leó Rafnsson; Iceland
200 m backstroke	Guðmundur Leó Rafnsson; Iceland	Rufus Bernhardt; Liechtenstein	Bergur Fáfnir Bjarnason; Iceland
50 m breaststroke	Snorri Dagur Einarsson; Iceland	Einar Margeir Ágústsson; Iceland	Patrick Pelegrina; Andorra
100 m breaststroke	Einar Margeir Ágústsson; Iceland	Giacomo Casadei; San Marino	Snorri Dagur Einarsson; Iceland
200 m breaststroke	Finn Kemp; Luxembourg	Einar Margeir Ágústsson; Iceland	Giacomo Casadei; San Marino
50 m butterfly	Miloš Milenković; Montenegro	Birnir Freyr Hálfdánarson; Iceland	Issei Kim; Monaco
100 m butterfly	Miloš Milenković; Montenegro	Florian Frippiat; Luxembourg	Birnir Freyr Hálfdánarson; Iceland
200 m butterfly	Florian Frippiat; Luxembourg	Hólmar Grétarsson; Iceland	João Reisen; Luxembourg
200 m individual medley	Finn Kemp; Luxembourg	Florian Frippiat; Luxembourg	Birnir Freyr Hálfdánarson; Iceland
400 m individual medley	Hólmar Grétarsson; Iceland	Nikola Kolev; Cyprus	Kevin Teixeira; Andorra
4 × 100 m freestyle relay	Luxembourg; Ralph Daleiden Ciuferri; Finn Kemp; Stanislas Georges Chausson; Julien Henx	Iceland; Guðmundur Leó Rafnsson; Ýmir Chatenay Sölvason; Birnir Freyr Hálfdánarson; Simon Elias Statkevičius	San Marino; Matteo Oppioli; Alessandro Rebosio; Giacomo Casadei; Loris Bianchi
4 × 200 m freestyle relay	Luxembourg; Ralph Daleiden Ciuferri; Florian Frippiat; Julien Henx; Anton Fedoseev	San Marino; Matteo Oppioli; Alessandro Rebosio; Giacomo Casadei; Loris Bianchi	Iceland; Guðmundur Leó Rafnsson; Magnús Víðir Jónsson; Veigar Hrafn Sigþórsson; Ýmir Chatenay Sölvason
4 × 100 m medley relay	Iceland; Guðmundur Leó Rafnsson; Snorri Dagur Einarsson; Birnir Freyr Hálfdánarson; Simon Elias Statkevičius	Luxembourg; Ralph Daleiden Ciuferri; João Reisen; Florian Frippiat; Julien Henx	Andorra; Aleix Ferriz; Patrick Pelegrina; Tomas Lomero; Bernat Lomero

Women

Event	Gold	Silver	Bronze
50 m freestyle	Kalia Antoniou; Cyprus	Jóhanna Elín Guðmundsdóttir; Iceland	Anna Hadjiloizou; Cyprus
100 m freestyle	Kalia Antoniou; Cyprus	Snæfríður Jórunnardóttir; Iceland	Jóhanna Elín Guðmundsdóttir; Iceland
200 m freestyle	Snæfríður Jórunnardóttir; Iceland	Vala Dís Cicero; Iceland	Kalia Antoniou; Cyprus
400 m freestyle	Sasha Gatt; Malta	Snæfríður Jórunnardóttir; Iceland	Lisa Pou; Monaco
800 m freestyle	Sasha Gatt; Malta	Lisa Pou; Monaco	Lou Jominet; Luxembourg
1500 m freestyle	Lisa Pou; Monaco	Sasha Gatt; Malta	Lou Jominet; Luxembourg
50 m backstroke	Kalia Antoniou; Cyprus	Ylfa Lind Kristmannsdóttir; Iceland	Jacqueline Banky; Luxembourg
100 m backstroke	Ylfa Lind Kristmannsdóttir; Iceland	Giulia Viacava; Monaco	Jacqueline Banky; Luxembourg
200 m backstroke	Ylfa Lind Kristmannsdóttir; Iceland	Giulia Viacava; Monaco	Eliza Nikandrov; Monaco
50 m breaststroke	Birgitta Ingólfsdóttir; Iceland	Elisa Celli; San Marino	Maria Erokhina; Cyprus
100 m breaststroke	Birgitta Ingólfsdóttir; Iceland	Elisa Celli; San Marino	Maria Erokhina; Cyprus
200 m breaststroke	Elisa Celli; San Marino	Maria Erokhina; Cyprus	Eva Margrét Falsdóttir; Iceland
50 m butterfly	Kalia Antoniou; Cyprus	Snæfríður Jórunnardóttir; Iceland	Jóhanna Elín Guðmundsdóttir; Iceland
100 m butterfly	Jóhanna Elín Guðmundsdóttir; Iceland	Nadja Djurovic; Iceland	Michela Portelli; Malta
200 m butterfly	Emma Barthel; Luxembourg	Nirvana Micallef; Malta	Agathi Manoli; Cyprus
200 m individual medley	Eva Margrét Falsdóttir; Iceland	Nàdia Tudó; Andorra	Ylfa Lind Kristmannsdóttir; Iceland
400 m individual medley	Lisa Pou; Monaco	Emma Barthel; Luxembourg	Eva Margrét Falsdóttir; Iceland
4 × 100 m freestyle relay	Iceland; Vala Dís Cicero; Snæfríður Jórunnardóttir; Nadja Djurovic; Jóhanna Elín Guðmundsdóttir	Cyprus; Christina Agiomamitou; Agathi Manoli; Iosifina Giovanni; Kalia Antoniou	Monaco; Giulia Viacava; Lisa Pou; Tiffany Pou; Eliza Nikandrov
4 × 200 m freestyle relay	Iceland; Eva Margrét Falsdóttir; Vala Dís Cicero; Snæfríður Jórunnardóttir; Nadja Djurovic	Luxembourg; Jacqueline Banky; Leeloo Reinesch; Joyce Bleses; Lou Jominet	Monaco; Giulia Viacava; Eliza Nikandrov; Lisa Pou; Lea Marić
4 × 100 m medley relay	Iceland; Ylfa Lind Kristmannsdóttir; Birgitta Ingólfsdóttir; Nadja Djurovic; Snæfríður Jórunnardóttir	Malta; Victoria Balderacchi; Zoë Annabel Cawsey; Michela Portelli; Nirvana Micallef	Cyprus; Iosifina Giovanni; Maria Erokhina; Agathi Manoli; Kalia Antoniou

Mixed

Event	Gold	Silver	Bronze
4 × 100 m medley relay	Iceland; Guðmundur Leó Rafnsson; Einar Margeir Ágústsson; Jóhanna Elín Guðmundsdóttir; Snæfríður Jórunnardóttir	San Marino; Matteo Oppioli; Elisa Celli; Alessandro Rebosio; Ilaria Ceccaroni	Luxembourg; Jacqueline Banky; Finn Kemp; Leeloo Reinesch; Ralph Daleiden Ciuferri

=== Table tennis ===
Event	Gold	Silver	Bronze
Men's singles	Luka Mladenovic; Luxembourg	Felix Wetzel; Malta	Sharpel Elia; Cyprus
Men's singles	Luka Mladenovic; Luxembourg	Felix Wetzel; Malta	Marios Yiangou; Cyprus
Women's singles	Sarah De Nutte; Luxembourg	Maria-Carmelia Iacob; Malta	Georgia Avraam; Cyprus
Women's singles	Sarah De Nutte; Luxembourg	Maria-Carmelia Iacob; Malta	Enisa Sadikovic; Luxembourg
Men's doubles	Luxembourg; Tom Scholtes; Maël Van Dessel	Cyprus; Sharpel Elia; Marios Yiangou	Malta; Dmitrij Prokopcov; Felix Wetzel
Men's doubles	Luxembourg; Tom Scholtes; Maël Van Dessel	Cyprus; Sharpel Elia; Marios Yiangou	San Marino; Federico Giardi; Lorenzo Ragni
Women's doubles	Malta; Maria-Carmelia Iacob; Renáta Štrbíková	Cyprus; Georgia Avraam; Konstantina Meletie	Luxembourg; Sarah De Nutte; Enisa Sadikovic
Women's doubles	Malta; Maria-Carmelia Iacob; Renáta Štrbíková	Cyprus; Georgia Avraam; Konstantina Meletie	San Marino; Chiara Morri; Chimei Yan
Men's team	Malta; Felix Wetzel; Dmitrij Prokopcov	Luxembourg; Luka Mladenovic; Maël Van Dessel; Tom Scholtes	San Marino; Federico Giardi; Lorenzo Ragni
Men's team	Malta; Felix Wetzel; Dmitrij Prokopcov	Luxembourg; Luka Mladenovic; Maël Van Dessel; Tom Scholtes	Cyprus; Sharpel Elia; Marios Yiangou
Women's team	Luxembourg; Sarah De Nutte; Enisa Sadikovic	Malta; Maria-Carmelia Iacob; Renáta Štrbíková	Cyprus; Georgia Avraam; Konstantina Meletie
Women's team	Luxembourg; Sarah De Nutte; Enisa Sadikovic	Malta; Maria-Carmelia Iacob; Renáta Štrbíková	San Marino; Chiara Morri; Chimei Yan

=== Tennis ===
The tennis competitions were held from 26 May to 31 May 2025 at the Princiesport, Andorra.

Event	Gold	Silver	Bronze
Men's singles	Valentin Vacherot; Monaco	Alex Knaff; Luxembourg	Andreas Timini; Cyprus
Men's singles	Valentin Vacherot; Monaco	Alex Knaff; Luxembourg	Alex de Gabriele; Malta
Women's singles	Victoria Jiménez Kasintseva; Andorra	Marie Weckerle; Luxembourg	Francesca Curmi; Malta
Women's singles	Victoria Jiménez Kasintseva; Andorra	Marie Weckerle; Luxembourg	Tea Nikčević; Montenegro
Men's doubles	Luxembourg; Raphael Calzi; Alex Knaff	Monaco; Leonardo Ljubicic; Valentin Vacherot	Cyprus; Nicholas Campbell; Andreas Timini
Men's doubles	Luxembourg; Raphael Calzi; Alex Knaff	Monaco; Leonardo Ljubicic; Valentin Vacherot	San Marino; Marco De Rossi; Francesco Giorgetti
Women's doubles	Luxembourg; Eléonora Molinaro; Marie Weckerle	Malta; Francesca Curmi; Elaine Genovese	Andorra; Judit Cartaña Alaña; Victoria Jiménez Kasintseva
Women's doubles	Luxembourg; Eléonora Molinaro; Marie Weckerle	Malta; Francesca Curmi; Elaine Genovese	Cyprus; Nina Andronicou; Andrea Georgiou Papakyriakou
Mixed doubles	Luxembourg; Alex Knaff; Marie Weckerle	Malta; Matthew Asciak; Francesca Curmi	Cyprus; Nicholas Campbell; Nina Andronicou
Mixed doubles	Luxembourg; Alex Knaff; Marie Weckerle	Malta; Matthew Asciak; Francesca Curmi	Iceland; Rafn Kumar Bonifacius; Emilia Eyva Thygesen

=== Volleyball ===
Event	Gold	Silver	Bronze
Men	Luxembourg; Gilles Braas; Michail Constantinou; Yannick Erpelding; Jérémie Feit; Max Funk; Mateja Gajin; Christian Galoppo; Philippe Glesener; Ryan Matilde da Luz; Samuel Marinho Novais; Simão Marinho Novais; Tomáš Pavelka; David Zehren; Chris Zuidberg	Cyprus; Angelos Alexiou; Nikolas Charalambides; Filippos Chrysostomou; Nikolas Eleftheriou; Alexandro Herrera Burgos; Orestis Kallis; Antonis Mavromattis; Marios Nikolaou; Christos Prodromou; Odysseas Savvides; Stamatis Savvides; Avgoustinos Savvidis; Constantinos Skordis; Marios Stroukarevits	San Marino; Davide Bacciocchi; Lorenzo Benvenuti; Matteo Bernardi; Nicolò Conti; Samuel Frascio; Davide Gasperoni; Gabriele Giri; Yan Kiva; Andrea Lazzarini; Marco Rondelli; Luca Volpinari; Matteo Zamagni
Women	Luxembourg; Kelsey Chambers; Julia Dufková; Yana Feller; Martina Fraschetti; Carole Grüneklee; Carla Mulli; Lara Picht; Marie Schaack; Cindy Schneider; Giulia Tarantini; Lilly Tarantini; Julie Teso; Emma van Elslande; Adriani Vilvert Joaquim	Cyprus; Ourania Chimonidou; Maria Chitziou; Thea Christoforou; Christiana David; Sofia Maria Georgiou; Veronika Hudima; Antri Iordanou; Aliaksandra Karabinovich; Demetra Kouta; Tatyana Mudritskaya Georgiou; Anni Prokopiou; Konstantina Siapani; Maria Olga Siapani; Elena Tsoutsouki	Monaco; Sana Bouyahia; Celia da Moura; Tetet Dembele; Liana Enza; Alexandra Erhart; Ottavia Hieulle; Cyrine Oujani; Lisa-May Portaneri; Anaïs Poulain; Virginie Proaskat; Giorgia Sartorelli; Cassia Schubler
