= Nina Dragović =

Montenegrin rhythmic gymnast (born 2008)

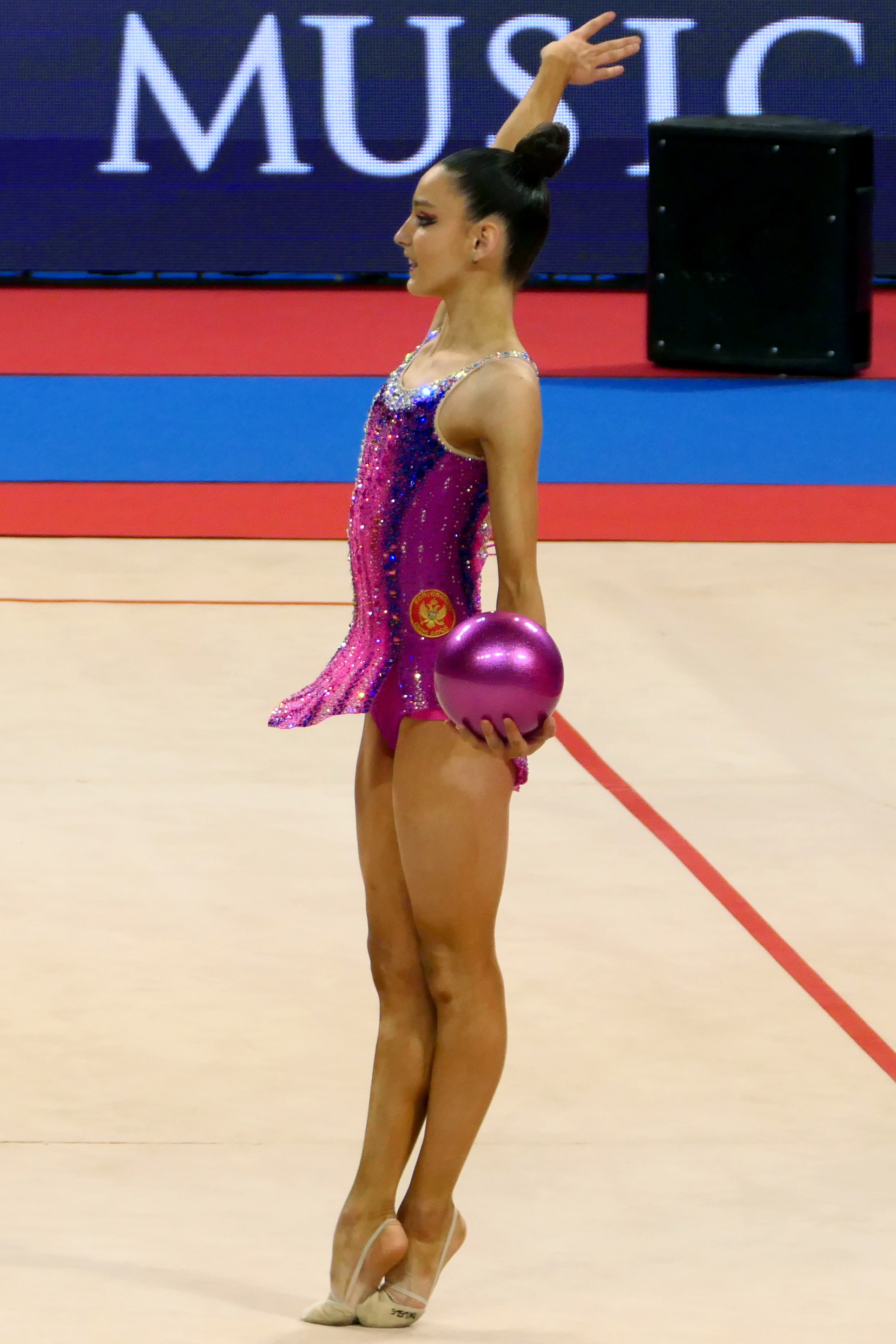

Personal information
- Born: 4 January 2008 (age 18) Podgorica, Montenegro

Gymnastics career
- Discipline: Rhythmic gymnastics
- Country represented: Montenegro; (2022-present)
- Club: GK Budva
- Head coach: Nina Kolesnikova
Medal record
Representing Montenegro
Rhythmic Gymnastics
Games of the Small States of Europe
Silver medal – second place	2025 Andorra	Team
Silver medal – second place	2025 Andorra	Hoop
Silver medal – second place	2025 Andorra	Clubs

Nina Dragović (Montenegrin: Нина Драговић; born 4 January 2008) is a Montenegrin rhythmic gymnast. She represents Montenegro in international competitions.

== Career ==
Dragović took up the sport at age five at the Enigma club in her native Podgorica.

=== Junior ===
In June 2022 Dragović was the sole representative of Montenegro at the European Championships in Tel Aviv, being 32nd with hoop, 33rd with ball, 28th with clubs and 29th with ribbon.

In July 2023 she was selected for the Junior World Championships in Cluj-Napoca along Andela Vuković, finishing 33rd with hoop, 41st with ball and 31st with ribbon. In September she took part in the 1st Balkan Championships in Budva.

=== Senior ===
She became age eligible for senior competitions in 2024, debuting at the World Cup in Sofia where she took 49th place in the All-Around, 46th with hoop, 51st with ball, 48th with clubs and 48th with ribbon. In May she participated in the European Cup in Baku, being 33rd with hoop, 53rd with ball, 45th with clubs and 43rd with ribbon. After a training camp in Azerbaijan she was selected for the European Championships in Budapest, taking 60th place overall, 67th with hoop, 56th with ball, 54th with clubs and 68th with ribbon. A month later she competed in the Balkan Cup.

In February 2025 she won bronze with hoop at the Miss Valentine Grand Prix in Tartu. At the World Cup in Sofia she was 50th in the All-Around, 44th with hoop, 40th with ball, 78th with clubs and 45th with ribbon. Later, at the stage in Baku, she was 56th overall, 43rd with hoop, 48th with ball, 62nd with clubs and 51st with ribbon. In May she competed in the Games of the Small States of Europe held in Andorra, winning silver in teams, with hoop and with clubs. In June she took part in the European Championships in Tallinn, being 42nd in the All-Around, 38th with hoop, 53rd with ball, 29th with clubs and 74th with ribbon. In August she was selected for the World Championships in Rio de Janeiro, taking 79th place in the All-Around, 92nd with hoop, 77th with ball, 74th with clubs and 76th with ribbon.

At the 2026 Miss Valentine tournament she was 7th with hoop, 7th with ball and 8th with ribbon. In August, she competed at the 2026 Mediterranean Games in Taranto, Italy, and ended on 16th place in all-around qualifications.
