= World Gymnaestrada 2007 =

2007 sports event

13th World Gymnaestrada 2007 Dornbirn
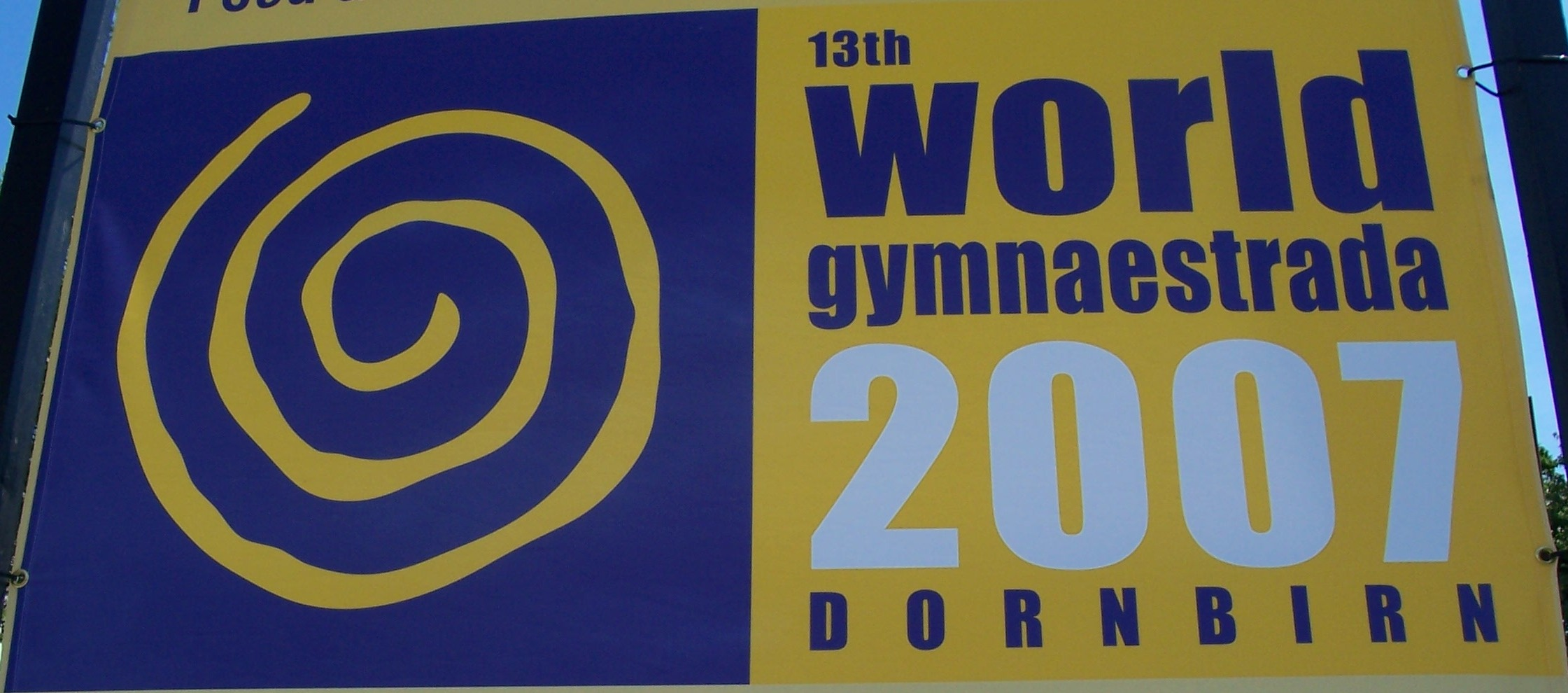
- Genre: Gymnastics
- Begins: July 8, 2007
- Ends: July 14, 2007
- Venue: Dornbirn, Vorarlberg (Austria)
- Participants: 22,000

The World Gymnaestrada 2007 (officially: 13th World Gymnaestrada 2007 Dornbirn) took place from July 8 to July 14, 2007 in Dornbirn in Vorarlberg (Austria). Over 22,000 active gymnasts and their companions from 53 countries participated in this World Gymnaestrada. The event was characterized by the intense sympathy of the population and the approximately 8,000 volunteers.

22,000 athletes and coaches from 56 countries took part in the opening ceremony. The opening and closing ceremonies with a gymnastics show in the Birkenwiese Stadium each counted 30,000 spectators.

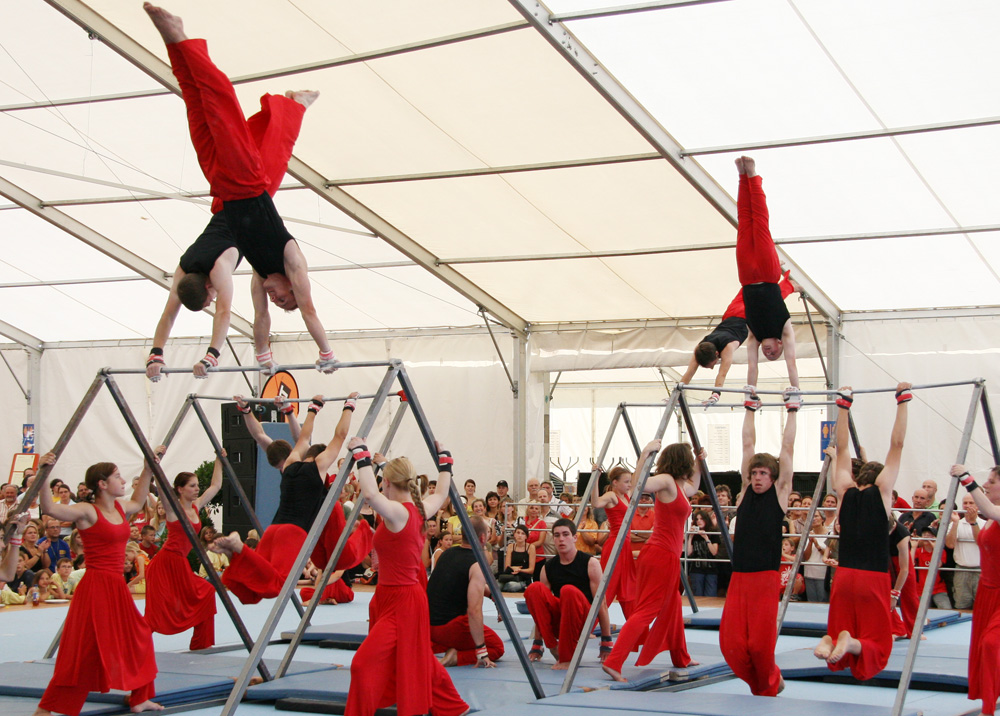
Street performance in Wolfurt (Vorarlberg)

== Location ==
The Dornbirn Exhibition Center and the Birkenwiese Stadium in the Schoren district formed the central hubs and meeting places of the World Gymnaestrada 2007. The daily non-stop group performances took place in the eight Trade Exhibition halls. As a highlight of the event, 16 national evenings with varied gymnastics shows were organized as well as three FIG galas with the selected top classes. There were also large group performances at the Reichshof Stadium in Lustenau and diverse events at eight outdoor stages in Höchst, Hard, Bregenz, Wolfurt, Dornbirn, Hohenems, Rankweil and Feldkirch.

== Organisation ==
The organisers reported a total of 175,000 overnight stays by the Gymnaestrada participants: 25 percent in hotels, 75 percent in schools. 7,000 people were taken to or picked up from airports in Zürich, Friedrichshafen and Munich. The World Gymnaestrada 2007 was a regional showcase project for promoting environmental friendliness of events. There were more than 60 sponsors for the event, six of which were the official main sponsors.

== Goals ==
The World Gymnaestrada aims to publicise the value and versatility of general gymnastics around the world and arouse people's interest in exercise and sports activities. General gymnastics brings together gymnasts from different cultural backgrounds to contribute to a better understanding between peoples. In addition, it aims to promote health, fitness and global solidarity.

== Photo gallery ==
Closing ceremony at the Birkenwiese Stadium (Dornbirn)

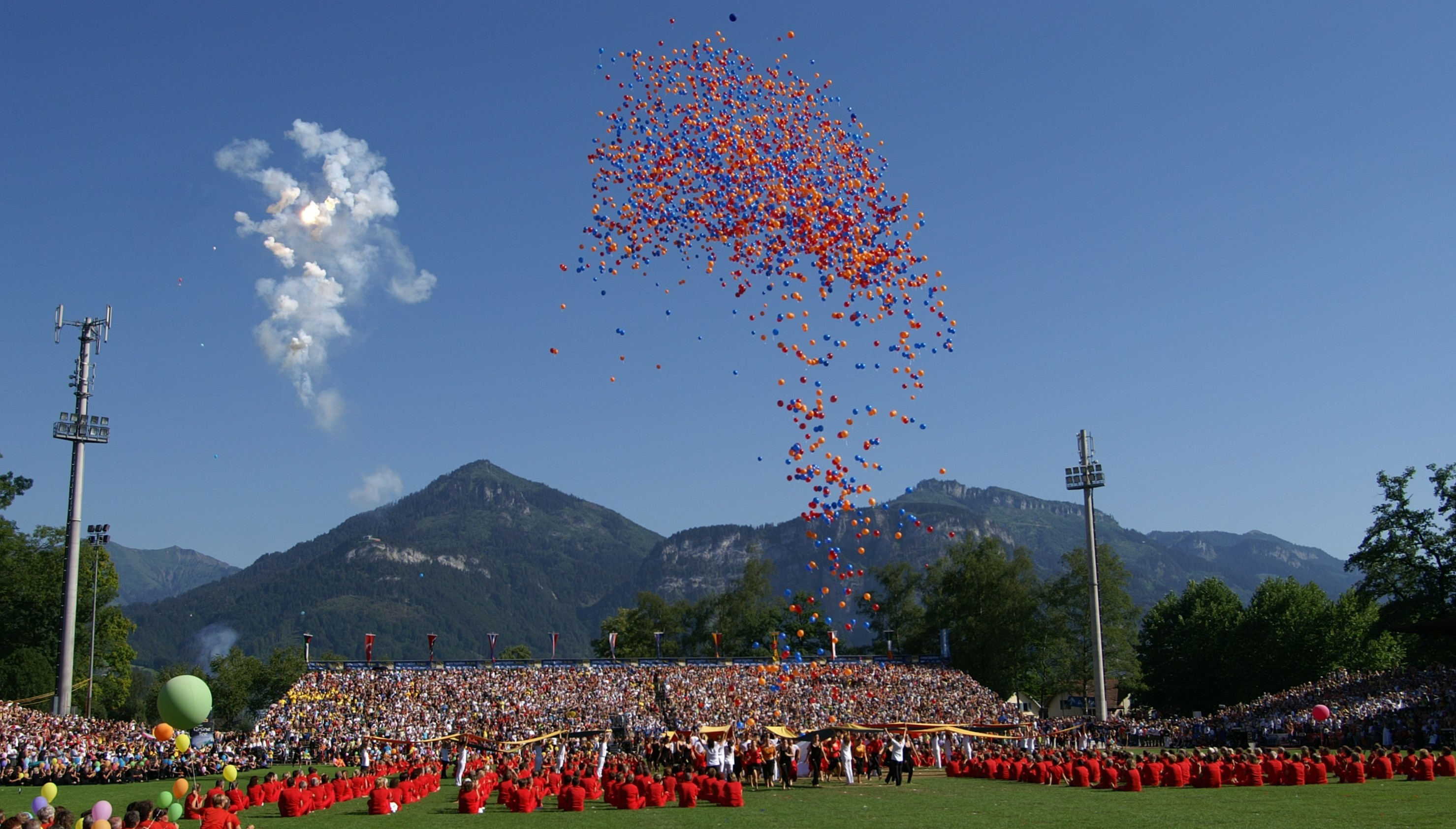

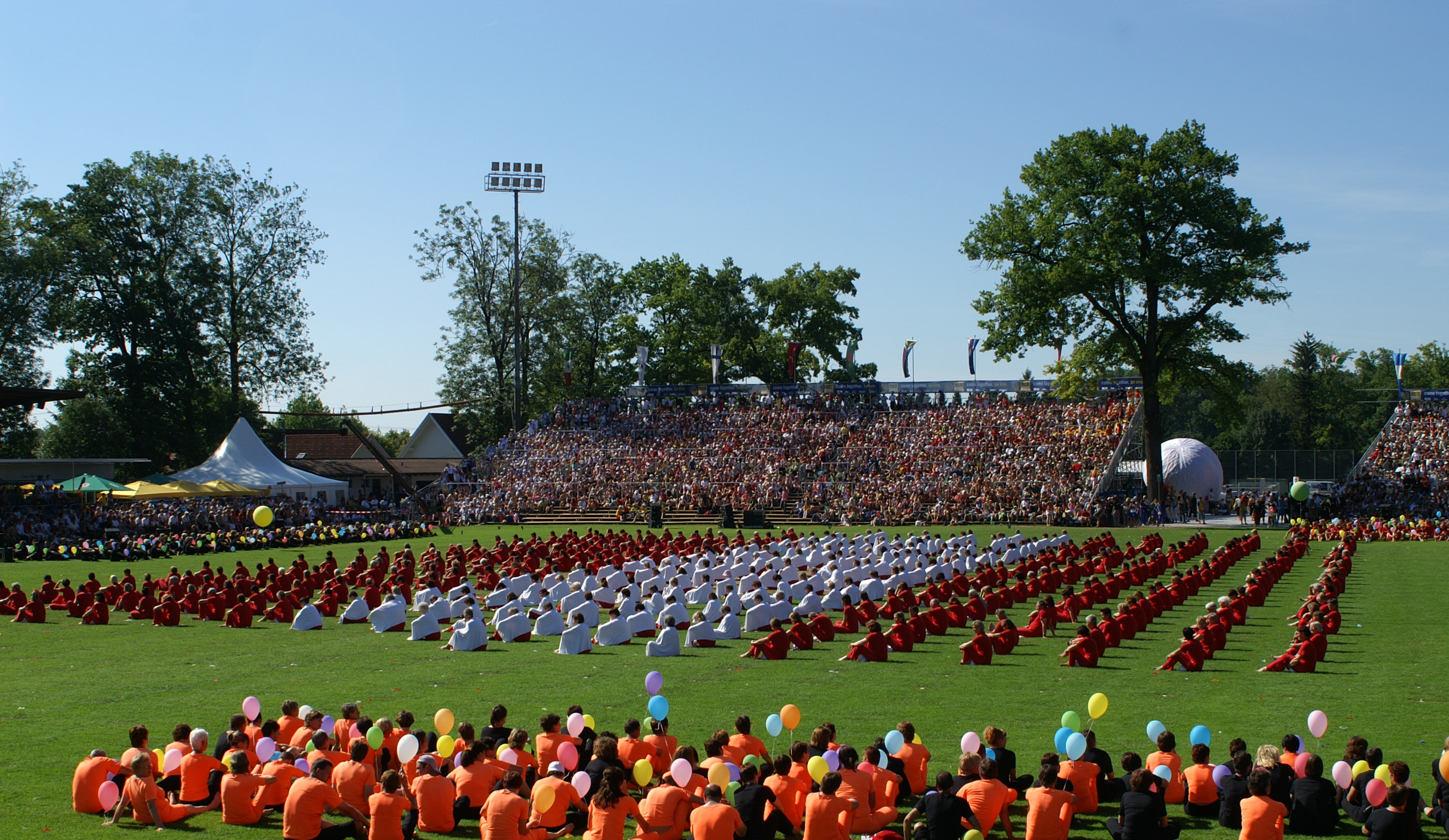

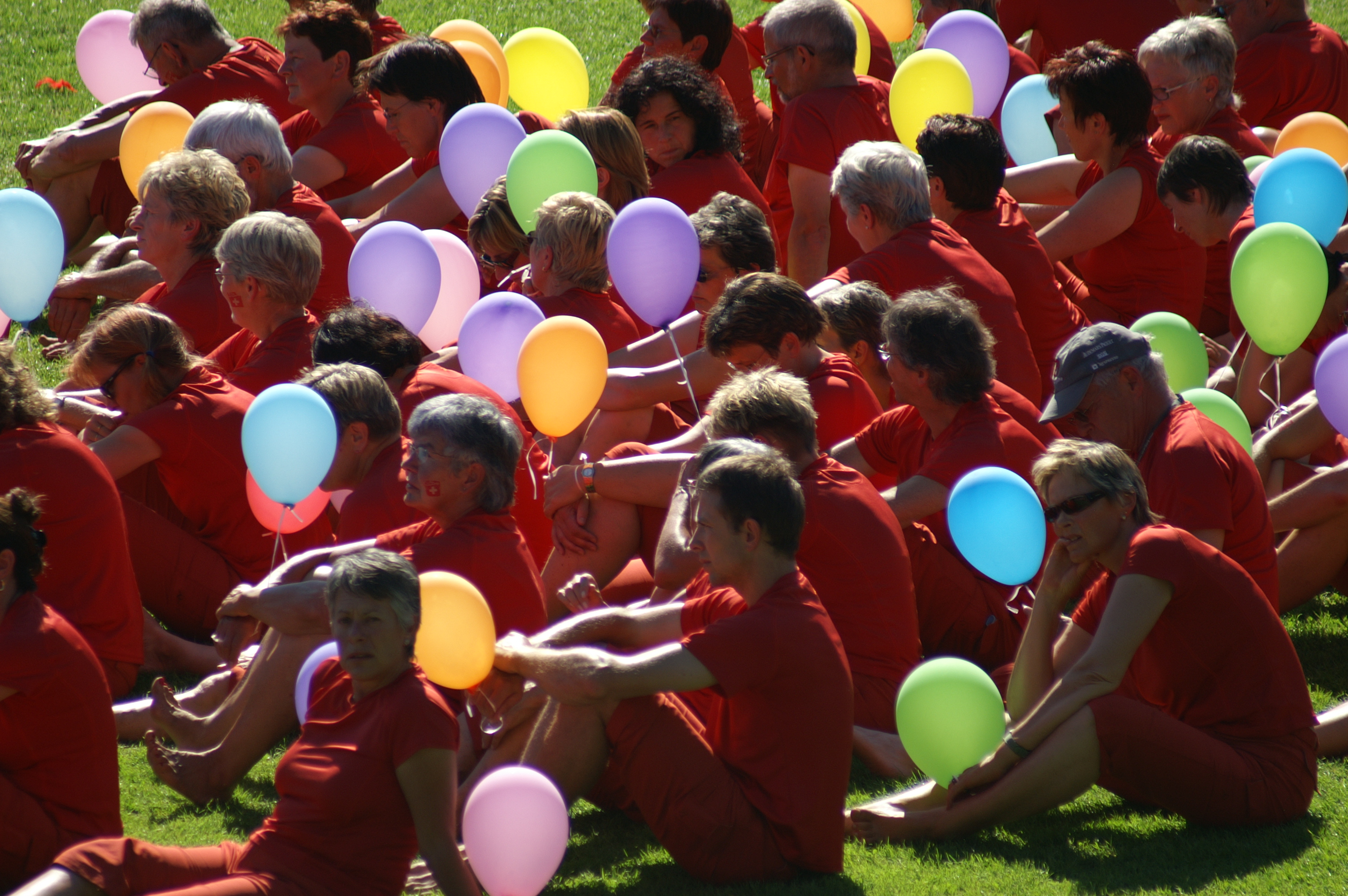

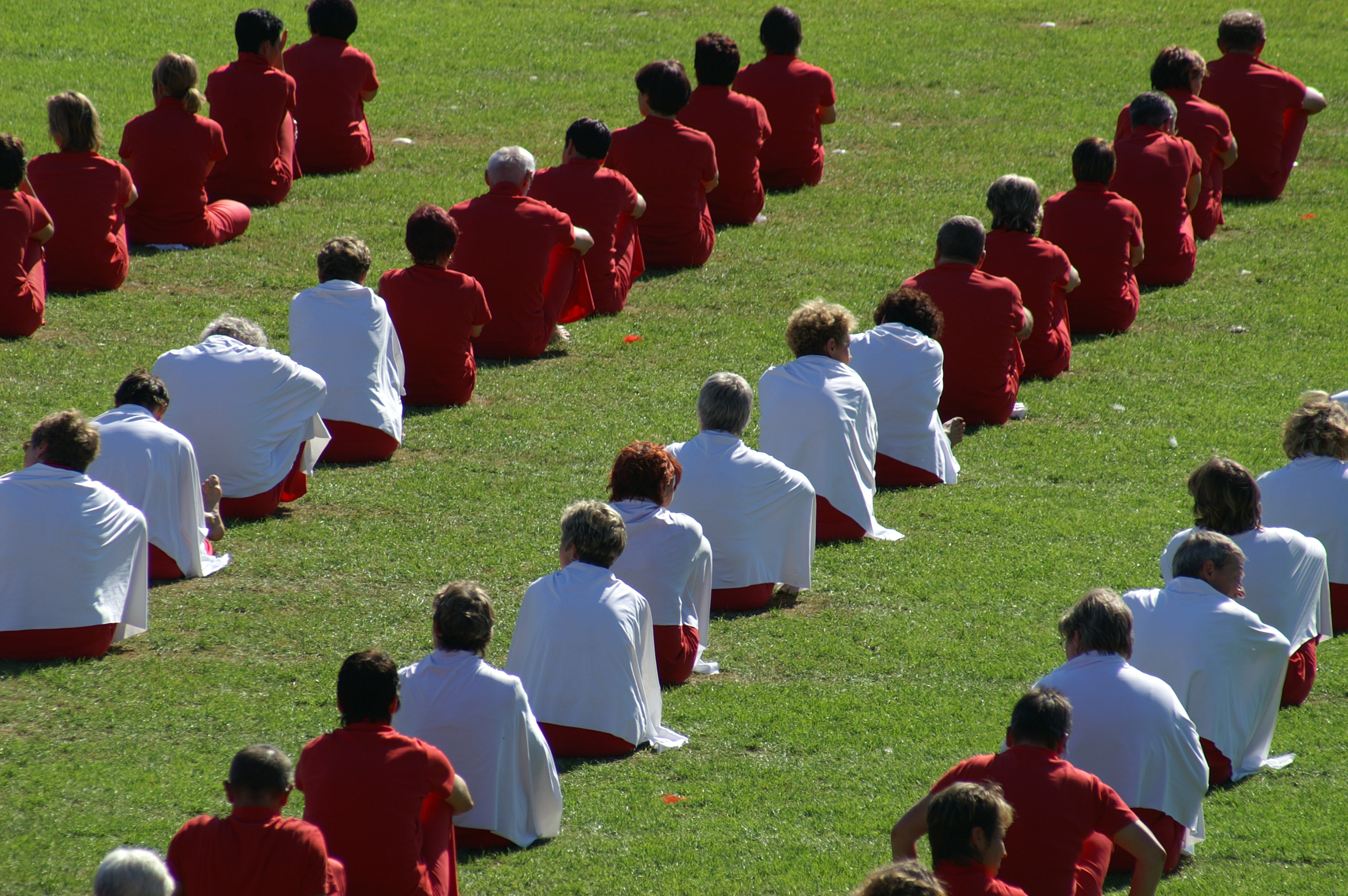

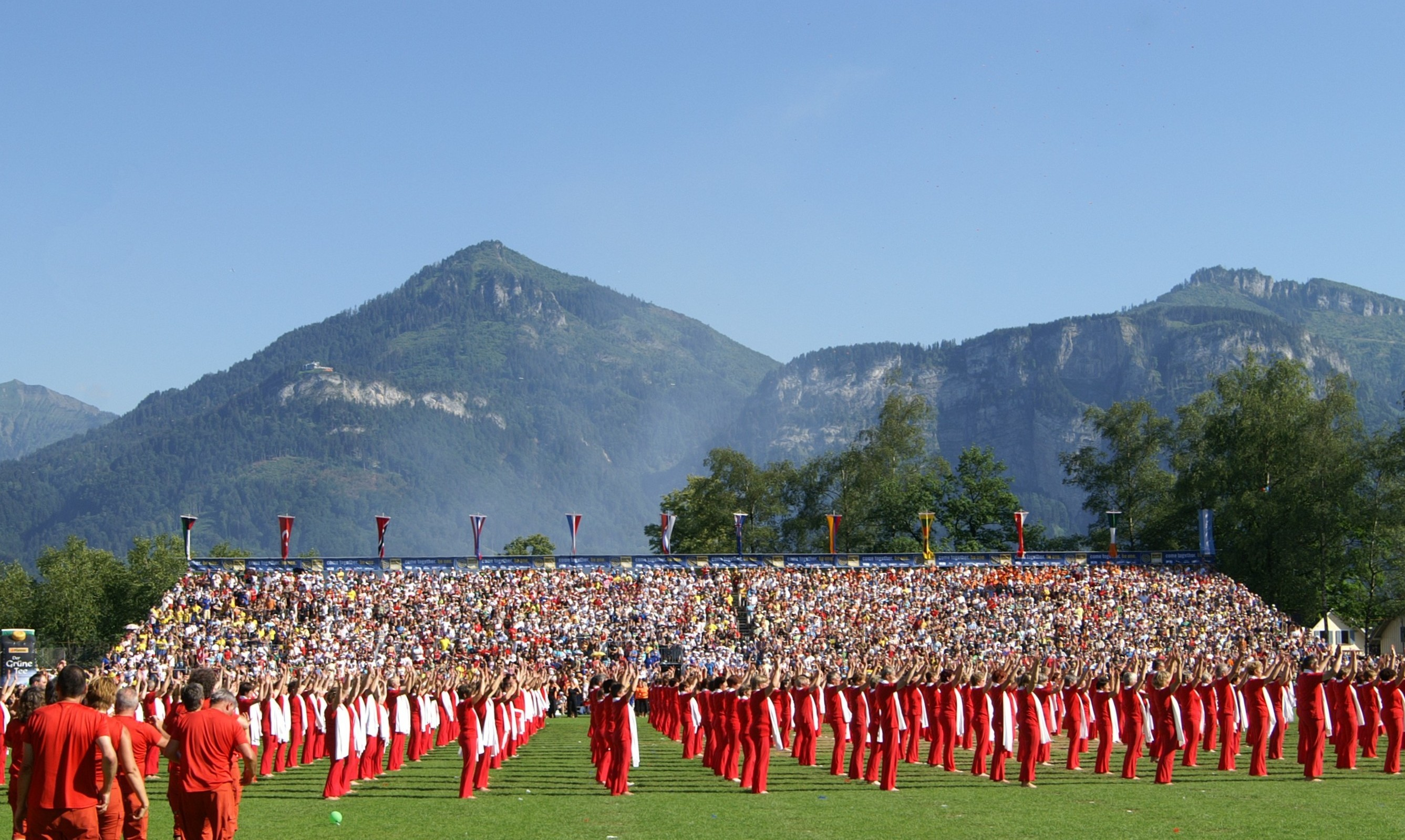

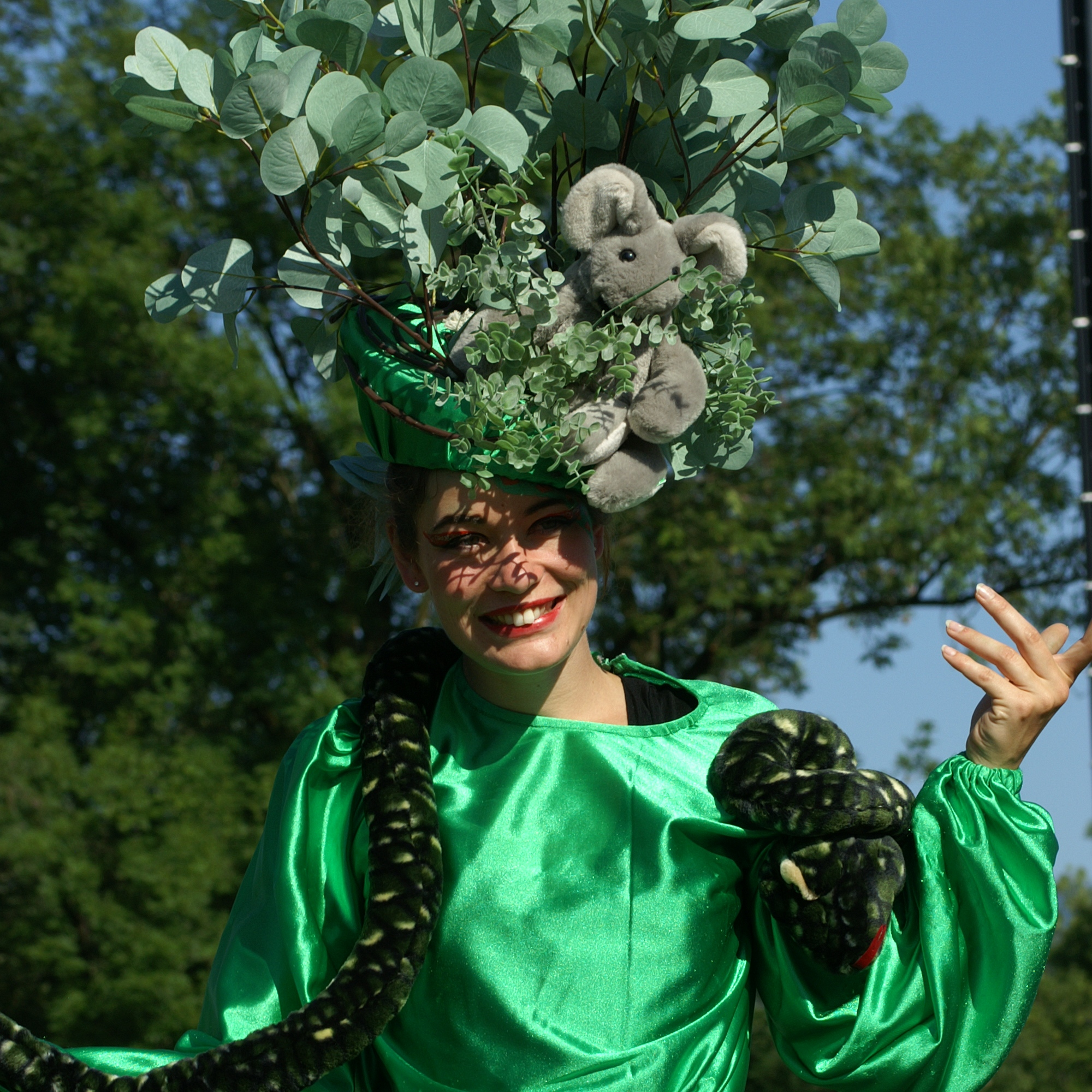

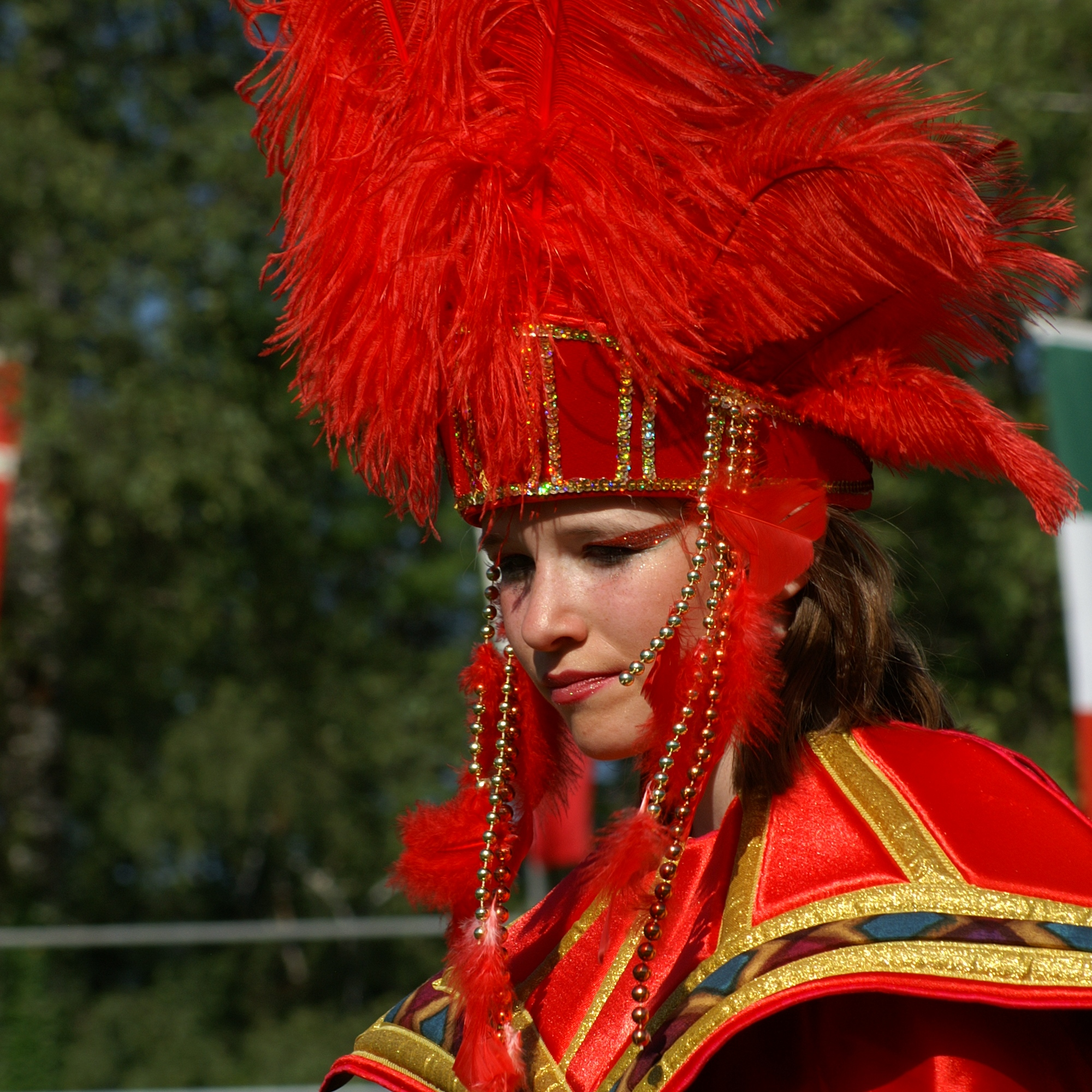
