= Andela Vuković =

Montenegrin rhythmic gymnast (born 2010)

- Alternative name: Anđela Vuković
- Born: 15 February 2010 (age 16) Berane, Montenegro

Gymnastics career
- Discipline: Rhythmic gymnastics
- Country represented: Montenegro (2023-present)
Medal record
Representing Montenegro
Rhythmic Gymnastics
Games of the Small States of Europe
Silver medal – second place	2025 Andorra	Team
Bronze medal – third place	2025 Andorra	All-Around
Bronze medal – third place	2025 Andorra	Clubs
Bronze medal – third place	2025 Andorra	Ribbon

Andela Vuković (Montenegrin: Анђела Вуковић; born 15 February 2010) is a Montenegrin rhythmic gymnast. She represents Montenegro in international competitions.

== Career ==
=== Junior ===
Vuković made her international debut in July 2023, when she was selected for the Junior World Championships in Cluj-Napoca along Nina Dragović, finishing 48th with clubs. In September she took part in the 1st Balkan Championships in Budva, qualifying for a final as an individual and winning two gold medals as part of the group. Two months later she won silver in a tournament in Baku.

In 2024 she was selected for the European Championships in Budapest, taking 36th place with ball, 31st with clubs and 31st with ribbon. A month later she competed in the Balkan Cup.

In May 2025 she competed in the Games of the Small States of Europe held in Andorra, winning silver in teams, bronze in the All-Around, with clubs and with ribbon. The following month she was selected for the Junior World Championships in Sofia, being 56th with hoop, 24th with ball and 27th with ribbon.

=== Senior ===
She became age eligible for senior competitions in 2026.
