= Berta Miquel =

Andorran rhythmic gymnast (born 2006)

- Full name: Berta Miquel Solé
- Born: 26 March 2006 (age 20) Andorra La Vella, Andorra

Gymnastics career
- Discipline: Rhythmic gymnastics
- Country represented: Andorra; (2017-)
- Head coach: Claudia Lopez
Medal record
Representing Andorra
Rhythmic Gymnastics
Games of the Small States of Europe
| Silver medal – second place | 2025 Andorra | All-Around |
| Silver medal – second place | 2025 Andorra | Ball |
| Silver medal – second place | 2025 Andorra | Ribbon |

Berta Miquel (born 26 March 2006) is an Andorran individual rhythmic gymnast. She represents her country in international competitions and is the first Andorran gymnast to qualify for a final at an International Gymnastics Federation (FIG) competition.

== Personal life ==
Miquel participated in several sports as a child and took up gymnastics at age six after having seen the World Gymnaestrada. She chose rhythmic gymnastics because she thought it was more elegant and would allow her to perform more. She began to train more intensively at age 12, and she trains seven hours a day most days of the week.

== Career ==
Miquel's first major competition was the 2020 European Championships in Kyiv, where she computed as a junior. She finished 23rd in the all-around.

She debuted as a senior gymnast at the 2022 World Cup in Pamplona. She was 26th in the all-around. A month later, she took part in the European Championships in Tel Aviv with teammate Maria Gonzalez. She ended in 57th place in the all-around with her best result being 44th with ribbon.

In August, she competed at the World Cup in Cluj-Napoca, ending 40th in the all-around. The next month, she competed at the World Gymnastics Championships in Sofia, and was 70th place in the all-around.

Miquel competed at the 2023 European Championships, where she placed 53rd. At the 2023 World Championships in Valencia, she finished in 73rd place.

In April 2024, Miquel became the first Andorran gymnast to qualify for a final in a FIG competition at the Ritam Cup in Belgrade, where she qualified for the ribbon final. She went on to compete at the European Championships and finished in 58th place.

The next year, in May, Miquel competed at the 2025 Games of the Small States of Europe, held in her home country. She won three silver medals, one in the all-around and two in the ball and ribbon apparatus finals. She expressed surprise at having won the medals, as she had not expected to be in medal contention. The next month, she competed at the European Championships, where she placed 54th. In August, she participated to the 2025 World Championships in Rio de Janeiro, placing 68th in the all-around and getting her best score with hoop.

Her 2026 international season started with her participation at the World Cup in Sofia in March, where she placed 74th in the all-around. In May, she competed at the European Cup in Baku, finishing 39th all-around. At the end of May, she competed at the European Championships in Varna, placing 66th in the all-around. She then competed at the Milan World Cup in July, finishing 76th all-around. In August she participated at the 2026 World Championships in Frankfurt am Main, finishing 69th in the all-around and getting her best score with ribbon.

== Routine music information ==
| Year | Apparatus | Music |
|---|---|---|
| 2026 | Hoop | N'insiste pas by Camille Lellouche |
| 2026 | Ball | Love on the Brain by Rihanna |
| 2026 | Clubs | Uncovered by Joseph William Morgan |
| 2026 | Ribbon | Memory by Joseph William Morgan |
| 2025 | Hoop | Cry Me a River by Michael Bublé |
| 2025 | Ball | California Dreamin' by Sia |
| 2025 | Clubs | Uncovered by Joseph William Morgan |
| 2025 | Ribbon | Memory by Joseph William Morgan |
| 2024 | Hoop | Cry Me a River by Michael Bublé |
| 2024 | Ball | California Dreamin' by Sia |
| 2024 | Clubs | |
| 2024 | Ribbon | |
| 2023 | Hoop | Carol of the Bells - Epic Version by Samuel Kim |
| 2023 | Ball | Et Bam by Mentissa |
| 2023 | Clubs | Holding Out For A Hero (from Shrek 2) by Zympzz / Holding Out For a Hero by Bonnie Tyler |
| 2023 | Ribbon | Wild Dances by Ruslana |
| 2022 | Hoop | Everything by Safri Duo |
| 2022 | Ball | Vida Loca by Francisco Céspedes |
| 2022 | Clubs | Respect (with the Royal Philharmonic Orchestra) by Aretha Franklin |
| 2022 | Ribbon | |
| 2020 | Rope | |
| 2020 | Ball | Questa Notte by Ludovico Einaudi |
| 2020 | Clubs | Respect (with the Royal Philharmonic Orchestra) by Aretha Franklin |
| 2020 | Ribbon | Samba Saiao by Fiesta Brasil / Palavra/Apesar De Você by Maria Bethânia |
| 2019 | Rope | |
| 2019 | Ball | |
| 2019 | Clubs | Who Put the Bomp? by The Overtones |
| 2019 | Ribbon | Samba Saiao by Fiesta Brasil / Palavra/Apesar De Você by Maria Bethânia |
