= Rita Araújo =

Portuguese rhythmic gymnast

- Born: 7 October 2003 (age 22) Almada, Portugal

Gymnastics career
- Discipline: Rhythmic gymnastics
- Country represented: Portugal; (2016-present)
- Club: Sporting Club de Portugal
- Head coach: Sandra Conde Nunes
- Assistant coach: Amelia Paredes

Rita Araújo (born 7 October 2003) is a Portuguese rhythmic gymnast. On national level, she is a seven-time Portuguese all-around champion.

== Career ==
=== Junior ===
Araújo represented Portugal at the 2016 Junior European Championships in Holon, Israel. She was 44th in rope, 40th in hoop, 54th in ball and 47th in clubs qualifications.

Two years later, she competed at the 2018 Junior European Championships in Guadalajara, Spain. She was 40th in hoop, 17th in ball, 26th in clubs and 47th in ribbon qualifications.

=== Senior ===
In 2019, she started competing as a senior, making international debut at Sofia World Cup, where she ended on 49th place in all-around. Later that year, she competed at Minsk World Challenge Cup, finishing on 32nd place in all-around. In September, she made her World Championships debut, competing at the 2019 World Championships in Baku, Azerbaijan. She ended on 59th place in all-around qualifications and 27th place in team competition.

In 2021, she started the season at Sofia World Cup, finishing on 56th place in all-around. She also competed at Baku World Cup, ending on 40th place in all-around. She competed at the 2021 European Championships in Varna, Bulgaria. She was 33rd in all-around qualifications, achieving best result with clubs (26th place). In September, she ended on 40th place in all-around qualifications at the 2021 World Championships in Kitakyushu, Japan.

In 2025, she ended on 41st place in all-around at Sofia World Cup. In May, she was 21st in all-around at Portimão World Challenge Cup. In June, she was selected to represent Portugal, alongside Joana Pinheiro at the 2025 European Championships in Tallinn, Estonia. She took 27th place in all-around qualifications, which was one of the best results of Portugal in recent years. In August, she represented Portugal at the 2025 World Championships in Rio de Janeiro, Brazil, where she ended on 63rd place in all-around qualifications.

In 2026, she took 65th place in all-around at Sofia World Cup. In May, she took 17th place in all-around at Portimão World Challenge Cup. In August, she represented Portugal at the 2026 World Championships in Frankfurt, Germany, where she ended on 55th place in all-around qualifications.

== Routine music information ==
Year	Apparatus	Music title
2026	Hoop	The Final Countdown by Damned Anthem
2026	Ball	Agua y Mezcal by Guitarricadelafuente
2026	Clubs	
2026	Ribbon	Todo Fue Por Amor (from Con Esta Luz) by Carla Morrison
