= World Gymnaestrada =

International gymnastics exhibition

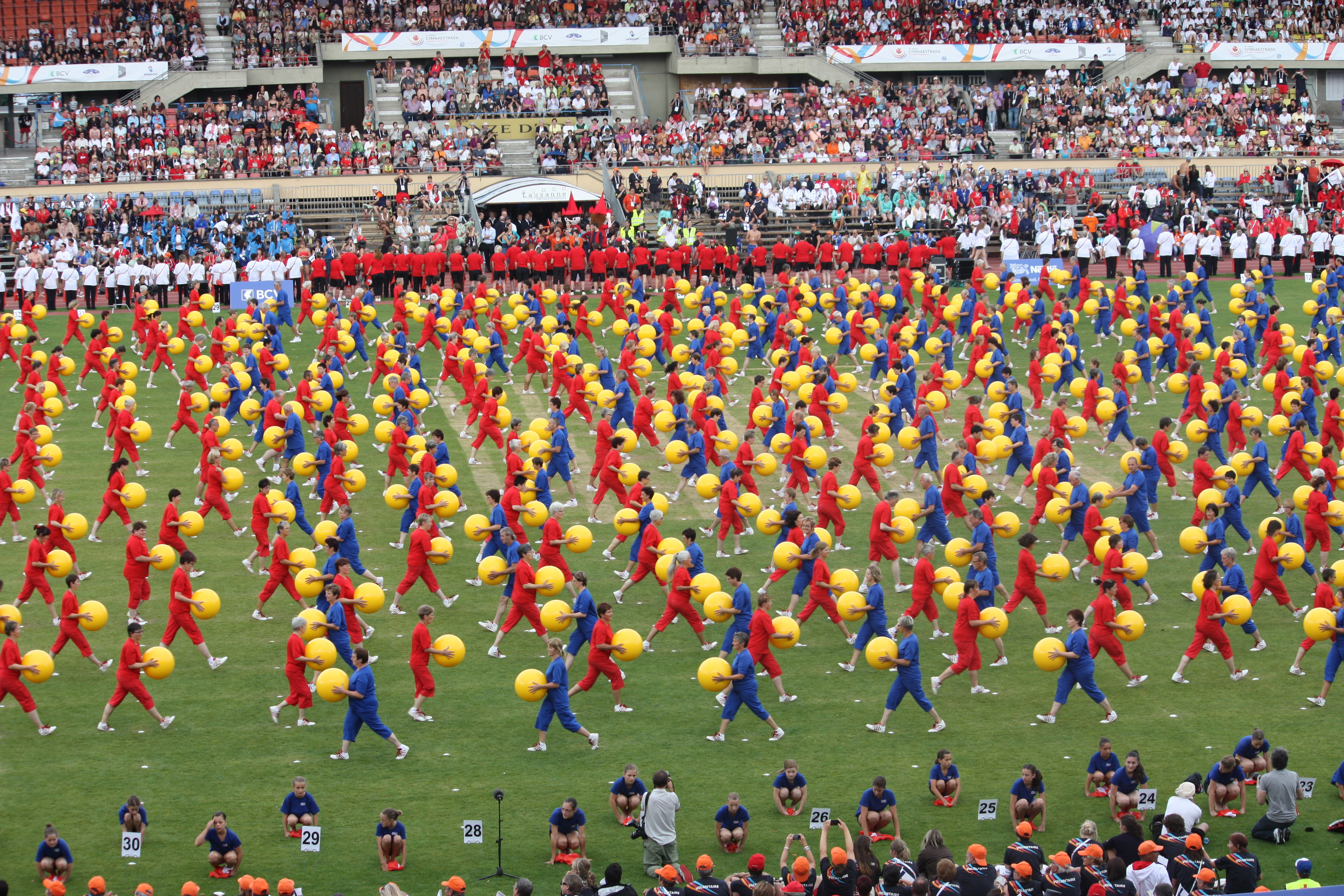
- World Gymnaestrada 2011, Lausanne
- Status: active
- Genre: sports event
- Frequency: every fourth year
- Inaugurated: 1953

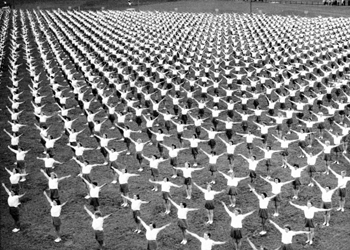
Mass routines at the 1949 Lingiad in Stockholm

The World Gymnaestrada is the largest general gymnastics exhibition. Much like the Olympics, the event is held every four years. However, the focus of this event is not on winning medals but instead Group Performances – some with hundreds or even thousands of participants. Adults and children of every age and description perform. Countries from around the world come together to showcase their talent and the culture of their various countries. The choreography is designed both to challenge the participants and to delight audiences. Routines are performed at various venues within the host country. Large group routines are known as "mass routines" which involve hundreds of gymnasts. The mass routines are often performed in large stadiums where spectators can take in routines performed by gymnasts from all over the world.

The World Gymnaestrada is the successor to the two Lingiads that were held in Stockholm in 1939 (100 years after Pehr Henrik Ling's death) and 1949.

The name Gymnaestrada is formed from the words gymnastik (international name for all sports relating to gymnastics), estrada (stage) and strada (street). It is believed to have been invented by J H Sommer, chairman of the Royal Dutch Gymnastics Federation and Mrs J. v.d.Most-Leyerweert, member of the board of DGF. They submitted their request for an international meet at the 1951 FIG conference. Zurcaroh from season 13 of America's Got Talent represented Austria at WG in Helsinki.

== Host cities ==
Edition	Date	City	Country	Participating federations	Gymnasts
I	15–19 July 1953	Rotterdam	Netherlands	14	5,000
II	10–14 July 1957	Zagreb	Yugoslavia	16	6,000
III	26–30 July 1961	Stuttgart	West Germany	16	10,000
IV	20–24 July 1965	Vienna	Austria	28	15,600
V	2–6 July 1969	Basel	Switzerland	29	9,600
VI	1–5 July 1975	Berlin	West Germany	23	10,500
VII	13–17 July 1982	Zürich	Switzerland	23	14,200
VIII	7–11 July 1987	Herning	Denmark	25	17,300
IX	15–20 July 1991	Amsterdam	Netherlands	28	19,500
X	9–15 July 1995	Berlin	Germany	34	19,300
XI	2–10 July 1999	Gothenburg	Sweden	39	23,500
XII	20–26 July 2003	Lisbon	Portugal	57	25,000
XIII	8–14 July 2007	Dornbirn	Austria	56	21,000
XIV	10–16 July 2011	Lausanne	Switzerland	55	19,100
XV	12–18 July 2015	Helsinki	Finland	55	21,000
XVI	7–13 July 2019	Dornbirn	Austria	66	18,000
XVII	30 July – 5 August 2023	Amsterdam	Netherlands	56	18,746
XVIII	11–17 July 2027	Lisbon	Portugal	TBA	TBA
XIX	7–13 July 2031	Las Vegas	United States	TBA	TBA

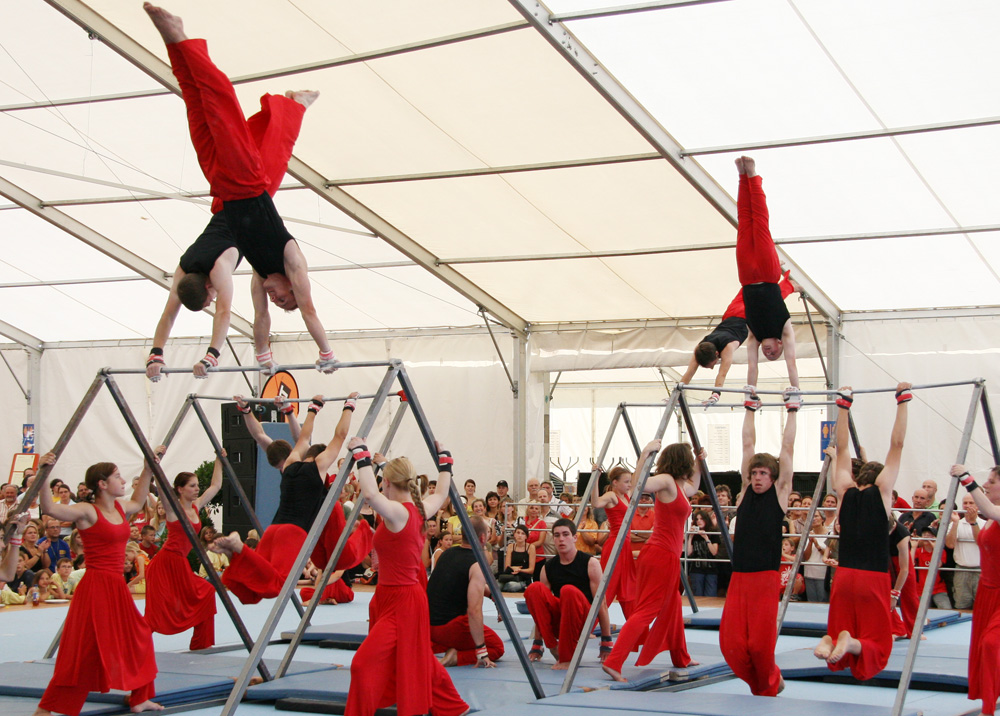
Impression of one of the outdoor stages at the 2007 Gymnaestrada event in Vorarlberg (Austria)

=== World Gymnaestrada 2007 ===
The 13th World Gymnaestrada was held in Dornbirn in Austria from 8 to 14 July. Over 22,000 gymnasts from 53 nations participated in the event. The opening- and closing ceremonies in the Birkenwiese Stadium had an audience of 30,000 each. The participants were looked after by about 8,000 volunteers.

=== World Gymnaestrada 2011 ===
The World Gymnaestrada Lausanne 2011 was held in Lausanne, Switzerland, from 10 to 16 July.

==== The World Gymnaestrada Lausanne 2011 in brief ====
- 7 days of events
- 55 nations
- 19,100 participants coming from 5 continents
- Average age 30
- Over 600 hours of demonstrations and shows
- More than 1,800 productions
- 4,300 volunteers a day

=== World Gymnaestrada 2015 ===
The World Gymnaestrada 2015 was held in Helsinki, Finland, from 12 to 18 July. It was the largest event ever held in Finland in terms of number of participants, surpassing even the 1952 Summer Olympics in Helsinki.

==== The World Gymnaestrada Helsinki 2015 in brief ====
- 7 days of events
- 55 nations
- 21,000 participants coming from 5 continents
- Average age 30
- Over 600 hours of demonstrations and shows
- More than 1,800 productions
- almost 4,000 volunteers required

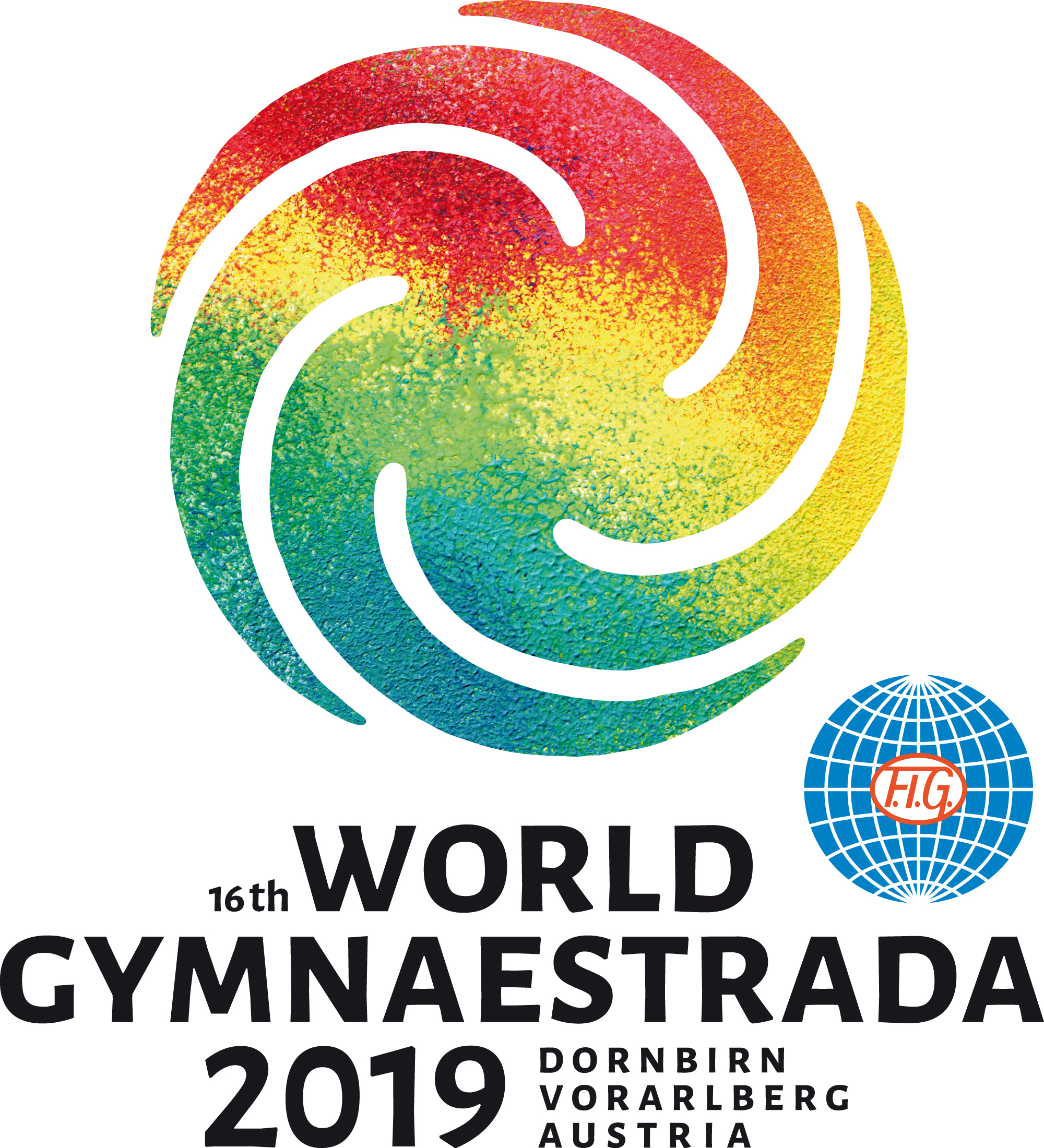
Logo of the Gymnaestrada 2019 in Vorarlberg, Austria

=== World Gymnaestrada 2019 ===
The 16th World Gymnaestrada in Dornbirn in Austria took place from 7 to 13 July 2019. It was the second time that this event was held in Dornbirn. The festival brought over 18,000 athletes from 66 federations and hundreds of guests to Vorarlberg, achieving record figures in Vorarlberg's tourism sector.

== See also ==
- International Gymnastics Federation
- Mass games
- Spartakiad (Czechoslovakia)
