= Maria Avgousti =

Cypriot rhythmic gymnast

- Μαρία Αυγουστή
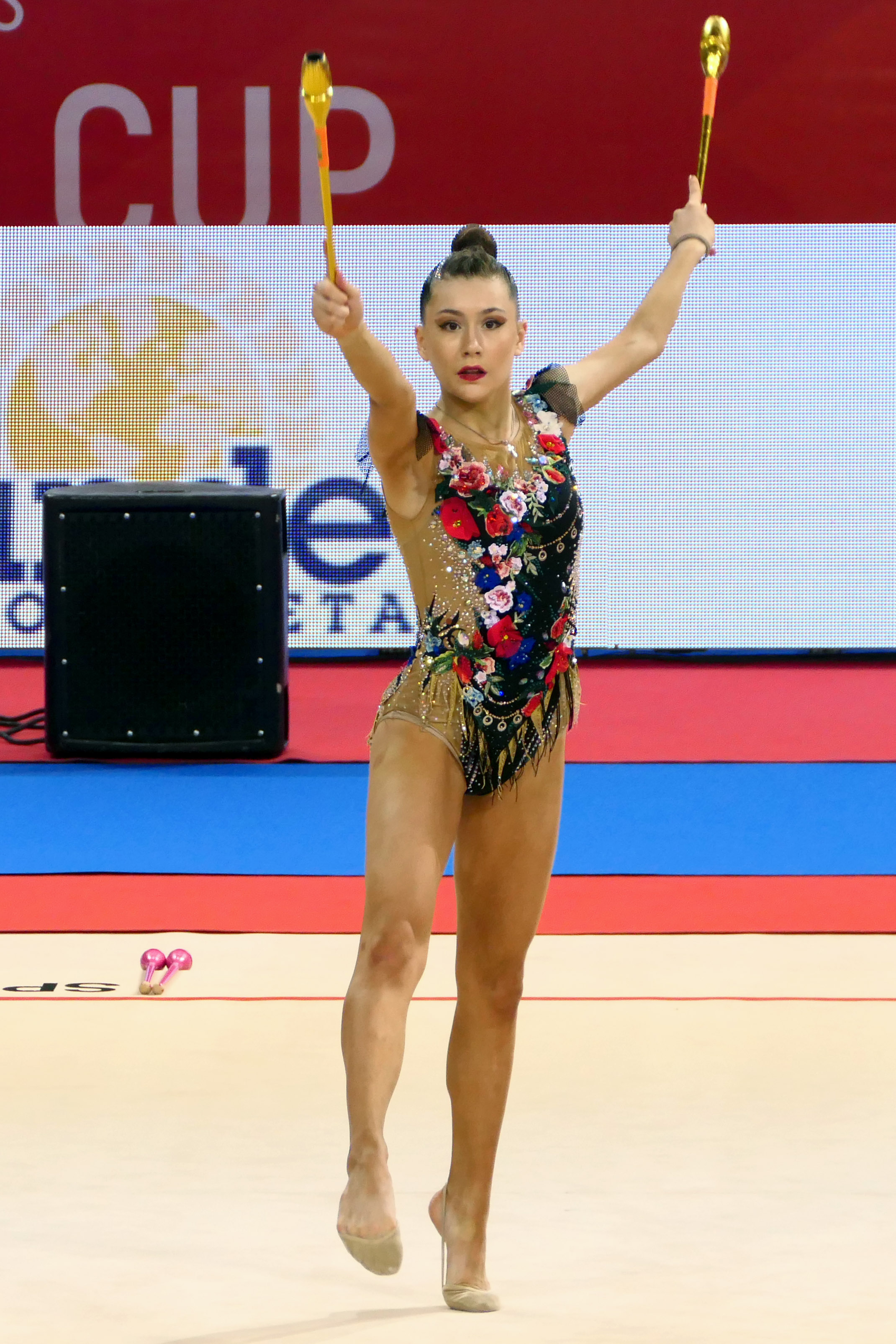

Personal information
- Born: 17 November 2008 (age 17) Limassol, Cyprus

Gymnastics career
- Discipline: Rhythmic gymnastics
- Country represented: Cyprus; (2024-)
- Club: ARG1 Cyprus
- Head coach: Marianna El Zafarani
Medal record
Representing Cyprus
Rhythmic Gymnastics
Games of the Small States of Europe
Gold medal – first place	2025 Andorra	All-Around
Gold medal – first place	2025 Andorra	Team
Gold medal – first place	2025 Andorra	Hoop
Gold medal – first place	2025 Andorra	Ball
Gold medal – first place	2025 Andorra	Clubs
Gold medal – first place	2025 Andorra	Ribbon

Maria Avgousti (Greek: Μαρία Αυγουστή; born 17 November 2008) is a Cypriot rhythmic gymnast. She represents Cyprus in international competitions.

== Career ==
=== Junior ===
In 2023, she competed at Junior Mediterranean Championships in Rimini, Italy, and won silver medal in team competition with Nika Khodareva and Sotia Marselli.

=== Senior ===
Avgousti became age eligible for senior competitions in 2024, making her debut at World Cup in Sofia where she was 34th in the All-Around, 34th with hoop, 31st with ball, 42nd with clubs and 34th with ribbon. She won bronze medal in all-around at Cyprus National Championships. In finals, she won silver with hoop and ball, and bronze with ribbon. In May she competed in the European Championships in Budapest, Hungary, being 24th overall, 30th with hoop, 17th with ball, 18th with ball and 25th with ribbon.

In 2025 she debuted in the World Cup in Sofia, finishing 40th in the All-Around, 50th with hoop, 56th with ball, 30th with clubs and 35th with ribbon. At the Pharaoh's Cup, she took 5th place with hoop, 13th with ball, 6th with clubs and 6th with ribbon. She then took part in the European Cup in Burgas, being 9th in the All-Around, 9th with hoop, 6th with ball, 11th with clubs and 7th with ribbon. Later she competed at the 2025 Games of the Small States of Europe in Andorra, winning gold in teams (along Mikaela Eleftheriou and Nika Khodareva), the All-Around and in all four event finals. The next month she participated in the European Championships in Tallinn, finishing 24th in the All-Around, 23rd with hoop, 18th with ball, 24th with clubs and 28th with ribbon. At the World Cup in Milan she was 59th with hoop, 68th with ball, 48th with clubs and 32nd with ribbon. In August she was selected for the World Championships in Rio de Janeiro, being 50th in the All-Around, 54th with hoop, 47th with ball, 42nd with clubs and 82nd with ribbon.

In 2026, she competed at Sofia World Cup, where she took 30th place in all-around. On April 10–12, she achieved 35th place in all-around at Baku World Cup. In the end of May, she represented Cyprus alongside Vera Tugolukova at the 2026 European Championships in Varna, Bulgaria; she placed 24th in the all-around, with clubs being her best apparatus. Together with senior group they took 11th place in team competition. In June, she competed at World Challenge Cup Cluj-Napoca and took 27th place in all-around. In August, she competed at the World Championships in Frankfurt am Main, placing 58th in the all-around and getting her best score with hoop; together with teammate Vera Tugolukova and the Cypriot national group, she placed 16th in the team ranking. Later the same month she represented Cyprus at the 2026 Mediterranean Games in Taranto, Italy, and ended on 9th place in all-around final.

== Routine music information ==
Year	Apparatus	Music title
2026	Hoop	The Rite of Spring, Pt.1 "The Adoration of the Earth" by Igor Stravinsky
2026	Ball	Mon amour by Slimane
2026	Clubs	
2026	Ribbon	Concerto de Berlin by Vladimir Cosma, Ivry Gitlis
2025	Hoop	The Rite of Spring, Pt.1 "The Adoration of the Earth" by Igor Stravinsky
2025	Ball	Mon amour by Slimane
2025	Clubs	Лале ли си, зюмбюл ли си by Nevena Tsoneva / Fearless by Thomas Bergersen
2025	Ribbon	Theme from New York, New York by Frank Sinatra
