= Panagiota Lytra =

Greek rhythmic gymnast (born 2006)

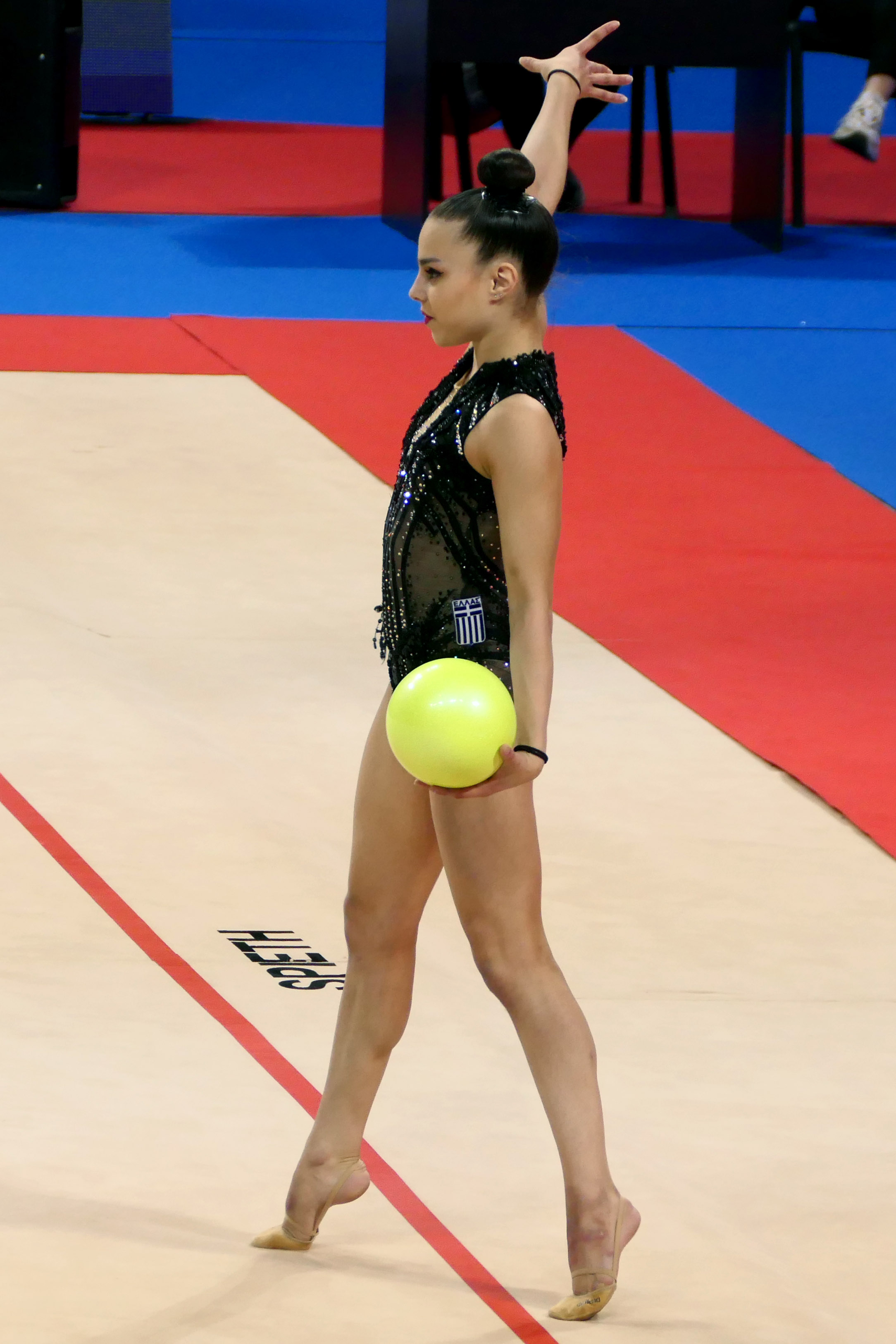
- Lytra in 2024
- Born: 14 December 2006 (age 19) Marousi, Greece

Gymnastics career
- Discipline: Rhythmic gymnastics
- Country represented: Greece
- Head coach: Evmorfia Dona
Medal record
Representing Greece
Rhythmic gymnastics
Event	1st	2nd	3rd
FIG World Cup	0	0	1
Total	0	0	1
Gymnasiades
Gold medal – first place	2022 Normandy	Hoop
Silver medal – second place	2022 Normandy	All-around
Silver medal – second place	2022 Normandy	Ball
Silver medal – second place	2022 Normandy	Ribbon
Bronze medal – third place	2022 Normandy	Clubs

Panagiota Lytra (born 14 December 2006) is a Greek rhythmic gymnast.

== Career ==
=== 2022 ===
Lytra became a senior gymnast in 2022. At Miss Valentine in Tartu, she won gold with clubs, silver with ball and bronze with ribbon.

At her first ever World Cup in Athens, Lytra won bronze with clubs, which was the first medal for an individual from Greece on the World Cup circuit. She then went on to compete at the World Cups in Sofia, where she was .100 points away from the podium in the clubs final, and in Pesaro, where she made the hoop final.

She was therefore selected to compete to the 2022 European Championships in Tel Aviv, Israel. She qualified in 10th place for the all-around final, where she finished 16th with 121.150 points. Lytra also made it to the clubs final, finishing in 7th with a score of 31.25. This was the best ever ranking for an individual Greek rhythmic gymnast in this apparatus at the European Championships.

=== 2023 ===
Lytra started her season in 2023 with the Grand Prix in Tartu, where she finished 6th in the all-around competition and qualified for all the event finals. Later in the year, she took part in the World Cup in Sofia. She placed 11th in the all-around and was 9th with hoop and ball; she qualified for the clubs final, where she was 7th. After that, she went to the Baku World Cup, where she finished 14th in the all-around. She also attended the World Challenge Cup in Cluj-Napoca, placing 10th in the all-around and qualifying for the hoop and ball finals. After this competition, she went straight to Italy to compete in the World Cup in Milan, where she placed 14th in the all-around and qualified for the clubs final.

Lytra was once again selected for the European Championships. She qualified in 10th place for the all-around final and finished the final in 11th place, and she also qualified for the clubs final. At the 2023 World Championships, she finished in 22nd place in the individual all-around qualifications and did not advance into the all-around final, thus missing a chance to secure an Olympic spot for Greece. However, she qualified to the ball final and placed 8th. She was the first Greek rhythmic gymnast after Varvara Filiou to qualify for an event final at the World Championships.

=== 2024 ===
In 2024, she competed at the Sofia World Cup, where she finished 11th in the all-around and did not advance into any apparatus finals. Her best result was with clubs (10th place). She competed at the 2024 European Championships in Budapest, Hungary, taking 12th place in team competition with senior group and 29th place in all-around. She did not advance into any apparatus finals. In September, she won gold medal in all-around, hoop, clubs and ribbon at Balkan Championships in Montenegro.

=== 2025 ===
She represented Greece at the 2025 European Championships in Tallinn, Estonia. She took 31st place in all-around qualifications and did not advance into the all-around final.

=== 2026 ===
In March, she competed at Aphrodite Cup in Greece and took 4th place in all-around. She qualified to two apparatus finals, finishing 7th with hoop and 6th with ribbon. In April, she competed at the Baku World Cup and took 39th place in the all-around.

In August, she took 48th place in all-around qualifications at the 2026 World Championships in Frankfurt. Then she competed at the 2026 Mediterranean Games in Taranto, Italy, and ended in 14th place in all-around qualifications.

== Routine music information ==
Year	Apparatus	Music title
2026	Hoop	The Greatest Show (from The Greatest Showman) by Hugh Jackman, Keala Settle, Zac Efron, Zendaya etc.
2026	Ball	Vanity by Brand X Music
2026	Clubs	Champion of the Rising Sun by Twisted Jukebox
2026	Ribbon	Wakanda / Waterfall Fight / The Great Mound Battle by Ludwig Göransson
2025	Hoop	Supremacy by Muse
2025	Ball	Violet's Dance of Passion (ヴァイオレット情熱の踊り) by One Piece OST
2025	Clubs	Champion of the Rising Sun by Twisted Jukebox
2025	Ribbon	Wakanda / Waterfall Fight / The Great Mound Battle by Ludwig Göransson
2024	Hoop	You're Just a Man in a Mask, For God and for Country, The Railroad Waits for No One by Hans Zimmer from The Lone Ranger
2024	Ball	Cloak and Dagger & Fate of the Clockmaker by Eternal Eclipse
2024	Clubs	Hartaetoi by Thanasis Polykandriotis
2024	Ribbon	Los Vestidos Desgarrados from The Skin I Live In by Alberto Iglesias
2023	Hoop	Electrotech Love, No Roots by Mark Holiday, Alice Merton
2023	Ball	Cloak and Dagger & Fate of the Clockmaker by Eternal Eclipse
2023	Clubs	Hartaetoi by Thanasis Polykandriotis
2023	Ribbon	Los Vestidos Desgarrados from The Skin I Live In by Alberto Iglesias
2022	Hoop	Zitti e Buoni by Måneskin
2022	Ball	Black Gold by Armand Amar
2022	Ball (second)	Cloak and Dagger & Fate of the Clockmaker by Eternal Eclipse
2022	Clubs	Doña Francisquita: "Fadango" by Amadeo Vives
2022	Ribbon	Rock Around the Clock by Bill Haley & His Comets
2021	Hoop	Haklek rahtak (حقلق راحتك) / Saltanat Dedikleri (feat. Bekir Unluataer) by Myriam Fares and Fahir Atakoğlu
2021	Ball	Poeta en el Víento by Vicente Amigo
2021	Clubs	Footloose (Glee Cast Version)
2021	Ribbon	Rock Around the Clock by Bill Haley & His Comets
