= Salma Solaun =

Spanish rhythmic gymnast (born 2005)

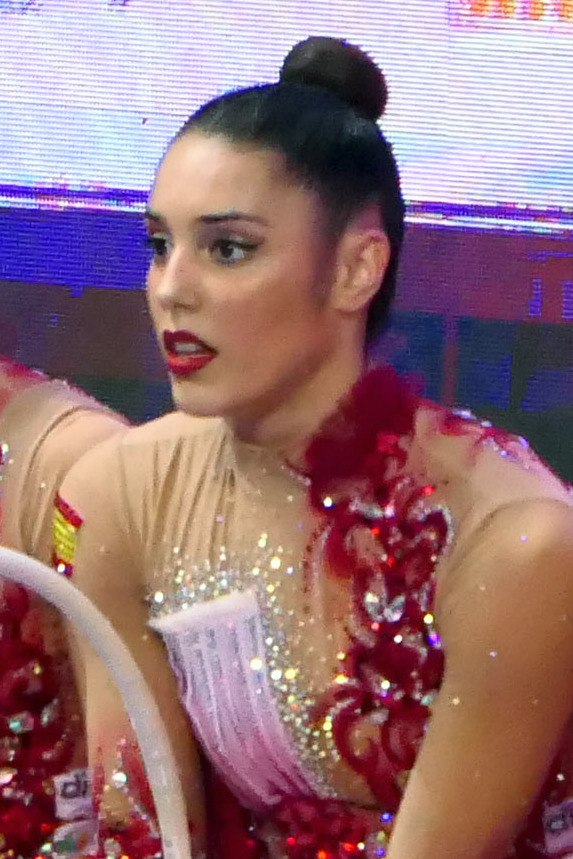
- Solaun in 2024

Personal information
- Full name: Salma Solaun Campos
- Born: 2 March 2005 (age 21) Vitoria-Gasteiz, Basque Country, Spain

Gymnastics career
- Discipline: Rhythmic gymnastics
- Country represented: Spain
- Club: Beti-Ritmica
- Head coaches: Alejandra Quereda, Ana María Pelaz
- Former coach: Marga Armas
Medal record
Event	1st	2nd	3rd
World Championships	1	2	6
European Championships	7	2	2
FIG World Cup	4	6	4
Junior World Championships	0	0	1
Total	12	10	13
Rhythmic Gymnastics
Representing Spain
World Championships
Gold medal – first place	2026 Frankfurt	Group All-Around
Silver medal – second place	2023 Valencia	5 Hoops
Silver medal – second place	2026 Frankfurt	3 Hoops + 4 Clubs
Bronze medal – third place	2022 Sofia	Team
Bronze medal – third place	2022 Sofia	Group All Around
Bronze medal – third place	2022 Sofia	5 Hoops
Bronze medal – third place	2023 Valencia	Group All Around
Bronze medal – third place	2025 Rio de Janeiro	Group All-Around
Bronze medal – third place	2025 Rio de Janeiro	5 Ribbons
Junior World Championships
Bronze medal – third place	2019 Moscow	Ribbon
European Championships
Gold medal – first place	2024 Budapest	3 Ribbons + 2 Balls
Gold medal – first place	2025 Tallinn	Group All-around
Gold medal – first place	2025 Tallinn	5 Ribbons
Gold medal – first place	2025 Tallinn	3 Balls + 2 Hoops
Gold medal – first place	2026 Varna	Group All-around
Gold medal – first place	2026 Varna	5 Balls
Gold medal – first place	2026 Varna	3 Hoops + 4 Clubs
Silver medal – second place	2022 Tel Aviv	3 Ribbons + 2 Balls
Silver medal – second place	2024 Budapest	5 Hoops
Bronze medal – third place	2023 Baku	3 Ribbons + 2 Balls
Bronze medal – third place	2024 Budapest	Group All-Around

Salma Solaun Campos (Note: In this Spanish name, the first or paternal surname is Solaun and the second or maternal family name is Campos.) (born 2 March 2005) is a Spanish rhythmic gymnast. She is the 2019 Junior World bronze medalist with ribbon, the 2026 World Group all-around champion, a three-time (2022, 2023, 2025) World Group all-around bronze medalist and a two-time (2025, 2026) European Group all-around champion.

== Personal life ==
Solaun took up gymnastics at age three because she was restless, so her parents signed her up for a rhythmic gymnastics class. She also tried swimming and skating, but in the end she chose rhythmic gymnastics. Salma now says that "rhythmic gymnastics is part of my life. I could not see myself without it". Her dream is to compete at the Olympic Games, like her idols Almudena Cid and Ganna Rizatdinova.

== Career ==
=== Junior ===
In 2018, Solaun was integrated in the national team while competing for Beti Aurrera. She then started taking part in international tournaments representing Spain. In June 2019, after winning the junior Spanish championships, Salma was selected for the Junior World Championships in Moscow, Russia, where she made the ribbon final in the end winning an historical bronze, the first individual medal for Spain since 1993.

=== Senior ===
==== 2020 ====
In 2020, Solaun was included in the senior national team, she won medals in competitions, such as the Moscow Grand Prix in February.

==== 2021 ====
In 2021, she was among the contenders to represent Spain at the 2021 World Championship, she made the team but an injury to her left knee prevented her from competing and was replaced by her teammate Teresa Gorospe. She underwent surgery on the problem in November 2021 and was away from the sport for five months.

==== 2022 ====
In 2022, Solaun decided to switch to the group, making her debut at the World Cup in Sofia, where they were 5th in the All-Around and 5 hoops and 6th with 3 ribbons + 2 balls. In Baku they were 12th in the All-Around and therefore didn't qualify for event finals. A month later in Pamplona they won bronze in the All-Around and silver with 5 hoops. In Portimão they won 3 silver medals. They won All-Around bronze and 5 hoops and silver with 3 ribbons + 2 balls in Cluj-Napoca. Salma took part, with Ana Arnau, Inés Bergua, Valeria Márquez, Mireia Martínez and Patricia Pérez in the 2022 European Championships in Tel Aviv, winning silver in the 3 ribbons + 2 balls final, and the World Championships in Sofia where the Spanish group won three bronze medals: All-Around (earning them a spot for the 2024 Olympics), 5 hoops, and team.

==== 2023 ====
In 2023, Salma and the group debuted at the World Cup in Sofia, taking 11th place overall and 8th with 3 ribbons & 2 balls. A week later they competed at the Grand Prix in Thiais. In April the group took part in the World Cup in Baku, being 10th in the All-Around and 8th with 5 hoops. In Portimão they won gold in the All-Around and silver with 5 hoops. At the European Championships in Baku the group finished 6th overall, 4th with 5 hoops and won bronze in the mixed event. After a training camp in Alicante Salma was selected for the World Championships in Valencia, there along Ana Arnau, Inés Bergua, Mireia Martínez and Patricia Pérez, she took bronze in the All-Around and silver with 5 hoops.

==== 2024 ====
The first competition of the group in 2024 was the World Cup in Athens, where they took 4th place in the All-Around, 8th with 5 hoops and 7th with 3 ribbons & 2 balls. Weeks later, in Sofia they won silver with 5 hoops, in Baku the group won gold in the All-Around and silver with 3 ribbons & 2 balls. In May she won gold in the All-Around and with 5 hoops as well as bronze in the mixed event at the stage in Portimão. At the European Championships in Budapest the Spanish group won bronze in the All-Around, silver with 5 hoops and gold with 3 ribbons & 2 balls. At the last World Cup of the season, in Cluj-Napoca, they won gold in the mixed event final. In early August Salma, Ana Arnau, Inés Bergua, Mireia Martínez and Patricia Pérez competed at the Olympic Games in Paris, where they took 10th place in the qualification event and thus not advancing to the final.

==== 2025 ====
In 2025, she continued in the group, debuting with a new formation along Andrea Corral, Marina Cortelles, Andrea Fernández, Lucía Muñoz and Inés Bergua, at the World Cup in Sofia winning gold in the All-Around and with 3 balls & 2 hoops. A week later they performed exhibitions of their routines in Ourense. In May, they took part in the World Cup in Portimão. Selected for the European Championships in Tallinn, she helped the group win gold in the All-Around for the first time in 33 years, winning gold in the two event finals too. In July, group won gold medals in all-around and both apparatus finals at the World Challenge Cup in Cluj-Napoca.

In August, the group competed at the 2025 World Championships in Rio de Janeiro, Brazil, winning bronze medals in group all-around and 5 ribbons. They took 4th place in 3 balls + 2 hoops final and finished 8th in team competition together with Alba Bautista and Lucia González.

==== 2026 ====
The group debuted the following year at the 2026 World Cup in Sofia, being 11th overall, 15th with 5 balls and 11th with 3 hoops & 4 clubs. In April they won silver in the All-Around and gold with 3 hoops + 4 clubs in Baku. They took 7th place in 5 balls final. Next, they competed at World Challenge Cup in Portimão, taking gold in 5 balls and bronze in 3 hoops + 4 clubs final.

On May 27-31, Salma and her teammates (Inés Bergua, Marina Cortelles, Andrea Fernández, Lucía Muñoz, Andrea Corral) won three gold medals (in all group events) at the 2026 European Championships in Varna. Spain thus repeated its achievement from the 2025 European Championships, becoming the first group in the modern era to win all group gold medals at two consecutive European Championships. They were 4th in team competition together with individual gymnasts Alba Bautista and Daniela Picó.
