= Teresa Gorospe =

Spanish rhythmic gymnast

- Born: 28 April 2005 (age 21) Vitoria-Gasteiz, Spain

Gymnastics career
- Discipline: Rhythmic gymnastics
- Country represented: Spain; (2018-2024)
- Club: Beti Rítmica
- Head coach: Marga Armas
- Assistant coach: Alejandra Quereda
- Retired: yes
Medal record
Rhythmic gymnastics
Representing Spain
Event	1st	2nd	3rd
FIG World Cup	0	0	1
Total	0	0	1

Teresa Gorospe (born 28 April 2005) is a retired Spanish rhythmic gymnast.

== Personal life ==
Teresa took up rhythmic gymnastics at age six in the first grade of primary school after seeing a friend do it. During summer she trains five hours every day, from autumn to spring she trains from 4 p.m until 8:30 p.m. Gorospe said she can now combine sport very well with studies, as gymnastics helps her to be more disciplined and to make better use of her time. In her free time she either studies or spend time with friends. Her favourite book and movie are Malory Towers by Enid Blyton and The Parent Trap by David Swift. Teresa says her best quality is that she's a hard worker, her idol is Russian gymnast Dina Averina who's a four time world champion. Her ultimate goal for her sporting career was to compete at the 2024 Paris Olympic Games.

== Career ==
=== Junior ===
Gorospe first gained national fame in 2017 when she became Spain's pre-junior champion. The next year she participated in the selection for the junior team, ultimately entering the national team. She then had her first competition at the Andalucía Cup, ending 15th with ball, 20th with clubs, 14th with rope and 23rd in the All-Around. Followed by a tournament in Sofia, Bulgaria, and the Grand Prix in Holon, Israel.

In 2019 Gorospe was selected by the national coordinator Alejandra Quereda to take part in the 1st junior World Championship in Moscow, Russia, where she was 7th in teams and 9th with ball, her only apparatus. She also won silver at the national championship, behind teammate Salma Solaun, the same ranking was repeated with clubs and ribbon, and it was reversed with rope and ball. In September she was confirmed in the national team for two more years and then competed at the Mediterranean Games in Cagliari, Italy where she was 2nd with the team along Salma Solaun, Lucía González and Irene Martínez, and with ball.

Teresa started her 2020 at the Moscow Grand Prix, where the Spanish team won the bronze medal. She was scheduled to participate at the Andalucia Cup and the Viravolta - Jael tournament, but then the COVID-19 outbreak stalled the season. Gorospe made her return to Madrid at the end of September. In October Teresa won the silver medal in the All-Around, silver with ball, bronze with clubs and silver with ribbon during the 2nd online tournament. Gorospe ended in 3rd at the Spanish championship behind Lucía González and Solaun.

In 2021 Gorospe was confirmed in the national team and was among the contenders to represent Spain at the 2021 World Championship she was selected as the reserve before Solaun picked up an injury and Teresa replaced her.

2022 Teresa started by winning gold in the ball final at the Grand Prix in Marbella. She then participated to the World Cup in Baku, Pamplona where she won bronze with ribbon and Portimão. Gorospe was the reserve for the 2022 European Championship, but she competed at the World Games. She retained the national bronze medal behind Polina Berezina and Alba Bautista. At the start of September she was confirmed into the national team for the 2022-2023 season.

In January 2023 Teresa was selected for the national team's training camp in Gran Canaria along Patricia Pérez, Irene Martínez, Valeria Márquez, Inés Bergua, Mireia Martínez, Andrea Fernández, Nerea Moreno, Salma Solaun, Ana Arnau and individuals Polina Berezina, Lucía González and Alba Bautista.

In June 2024 she announced her retirement from the sport.
