= Andrea Corral =

Spanish rhythmic gymnast (born 2008)

- Born: July 5, 2008 (age 18) León, Spain

Gymnastics career
- Discipline: Rhythmic gymnastics
- Country represented: Spain; (2022-present)
- Club: Club Ritmo
- Head coaches: Alejandra Quereda, Ana María Pelaz
- Former coaches: Ruth Fernández Menéndez; Carolina Malchair; Maria Garcia
Medal record
Rhythmic Gymnastics
Representing Spain
Event	1st	2nd	3rd
World Championships	1	1	2
European Championships	6	0	0
FIG World Cup	8	3	2
Total	15	4	4
World Championships
Gold medal – first place	2026 Frankfurt	Group All-Around
Silver medal – second place	2026 Frankfurt	3 Hoops + 4 Clubs
Bronze medal – third place	2025 Rio de Janeiro	Group All-Around
Bronze medal – third place	2025 Rio de Janeiro	5 Ribbons
European Championships
Gold medal – first place	2025 Tallinn	Group All-around
Gold medal – first place	2025 Tallinn	5 Ribbons
Gold medal – first place	2025 Tallinn	3 Balls + 2 Hoops
Gold medal – first place	2026 Varna	Group All-around
Gold medal – first place	2026 Varna	5 Balls
Gold medal – first place	2026 Varna	3 Hoops + 4 Clubs

Andrea Corral (born 5 July 2008) is a Spanish rhythmic gymnast. She is the 2026 World Group all-around champion, the 2025 World group all-around bronze medalist and a two-time (2025, 2026) European Group all-around champion.

== Personal life ==
Corral took up the sport at age three. In 2022, alongside her teammate Andrea Fernández, she was named Best Female Athlete of the Year by the Gymnastics Federation of Castile and León.

== Career ==
In 2018, she won gold with hoop at the Spanish Championships in the children category. The following year she won silver in the same event.

=== Junior ===
In 2022, she was incorporated into the Spanish national junior team. In May 2023, Corral, Daniela Picó, Alexandra Marcos, Alba Vidal, Celia Rodríguez, and Lucía Muñoz competed at the European Championships in Baku, taking 8th place overall and 5th with 5 balls. In June they won bronze with 5 ropes at the Pharaoh Cup. A month later, they took part in the Junior World Championships in Cluj-Napoca, finishing in 11th place in the All-Around, 18th with 5 balls, 7th with 5 ropes, and 18th in teams.

=== Senior ===
In December 2023, she was selected for the Spanish nation senior team.

In 2025, after Patricia Pérez and Ana Arnau retired, she made it into the starting 5. In April, her, Inés Bergua, Marina Cortelles, Andrea Fernández, Lucía Muñoz, and Salma Solaun made their debut at the World Cup in Sofia, winning gold in the All-Around and with 3 balls & 2 hoops. A week later they performed exhibitions of their routines in Ourense. In May, they took part in the World Cup in Portimão. Selected for the European Championships in Tallinn, she helped the group win gold in the All-Around for the first time in 33 years, winning gold in the two event finals too. In July, group won gold medals in all-around and both apparatus finals at the World Challenge Cup in Cluj-Napoca. In August, the group competed at the 2025 World Championships in Rio de Janeiro, Brazil, winning bronze medals in group all-around and 5 ribbons. They took 4th place in 3 balls + 2 hoops final and finished 8th in team competition together with Alba Bautista and Lucia González.

The group debuted the following year at the 2026 World Cup in Sofia, being 11th overall, 15th with 5 balls and 11th with 3 hoops & 4 clubs. In April they won silver in the All-Around and gold with 3 hoops + 4 clubs in Baku. They took 7th place in 5 balls final. Next, they competed at World Challenge Cup in Portimão, taking gold in 5 balls and bronze in 3 hoops + 4 clubs final. On May 27-31, Andrea and her teammates (Inés Bergua, Marina Cortelles, Andrea Fernández, Lucía Muñoz, Salma Solaun) won three gold medals (in all group events) at the 2026 European Championships in Varna. Spain thus repeated its achievement from the 2025 European Championships, becoming the first group in the modern era to win all group gold medals at two consecutive European Championships. They were 4th in team competition together with individual gymnasts Alba Bautista and Daniela Picó. In July, they won bronze medal in all-around behind Brazil and China at Milan World Cup and gold medal in 5 Ball final.
