= Lucía Muñoz (gymnast) =

Spanish rhythmic gymnast

- Born: July 11, 2008 (age 18) Valencia, Spain

Gymnastics career
- Discipline: Rhythmic gymnastics
- Country represented: Spain; (2022-present)
- Head coaches: Alejandra Quereda, Ana María Pelaz
Medal record
Rhythmic Gymnastics
Representing Spain
Event	1st	2nd	3rd
World Championships	1	1	2
European Championships	6	0	0
FIG World Cup	8	3	2
Total	15	4	4
World Championships
Gold medal – first place	2026 Frankfurt	Group All-Around
Silver medal – second place	2026 Frankfurt	3 Hoops + 4 Clubs
Bronze medal – third place	2025 Rio de Janeiro	Group All-Around
Bronze medal – third place	2025 Rio de Janeiro	5 Ribbons
European Championships
Gold medal – first place	2025 Tallinn	Group All-around
Gold medal – first place	2025 Tallinn	5 Ribbons
Gold medal – first place	2025 Tallinn	3 Balls + 2 Hoops
Gold medal – first place	2026 Varna	Group All-around
Gold medal – first place	2026 Varna	5 Balls
Gold medal – first place	2026 Varna	3 Hoops + 4 Clubs

Lucía Muñoz (born 11 July 2008) is a Spanish rhythmic gymnast. She is the 2026 World Group all-around champion, the 2025 World group all-around bronze medalist and a two-time (2025, 2026) European Group all-around champion.

== Career ==
=== Junior ===
In 2022, Muñoz was incorporated into the national junior group. In May 2023 Corral, Daniela Picó, Alexandra Marcos, Alba Vidal, Celia Rodríguez and Andrea Corral, competed at the Junior European Championships in Baku, Azerbaijan, taking 8th place in group all-around and 5th with 5 balls. In June they won bronze with 5 ropes at the Pharaoh Cup. A month later, they took part in the Junior World Championships in Cluj-Napoca, Romania, placing 11th in the group all-Around, 18th with 5 balls, 7th with 5 ropes and 18th in teams.

=== Senior ===
In December 2023 she was selected for the Spanish senior group. In 2025, after Patricia Pérez and Ana Arnau retired, she made it into the starting 5. In April her, Inés Bergua, Marina Cortelles, Andrea Fernández, Andrea Corral and Salma Solaun made their debut at the World Cup in Sofia winning gold in the All-Around and with 3 balls & 2 hoops. A week later they performed exhibitions of their routines in Ourense. In May they won silver in the All-Around and with 5 hoops, as well as bronze in the mixed event, at the stage in Portimão. Selected for the European Championships in Tallinn, she helped the group win gold in the All-Around for the first time in 33 years, winning gold in the two event finals too. In July, group won gold medals in all-around and both apparatus finals at the World Challenge Cup in Cluj-Napoca. In August, the group competed at the 2025 World Championships in Rio de Janeiro, Brazil, winning bronze medals in group all-around and 5 ribbons. They took 4th place in 3 balls + 2 hoops final and finished 8th in team competition together with Alba Bautista and Lucia González.

The group debuted the following year at the 2026 World Cup in Sofia, being 11th overall, 15th with 5 balls and 11th with 3 hoops & 4 clubs. In April they won silver in the All-Around and gold with 3 hoops & 4 clubs in Baku. They took 7th place in 5 balls final. Next, they competed at World Challenge Cup in Portimão, taking gold in 5 balls and bronze in 3 hoops + 4 clubs final. On May 27-31, Lucía and her teammates (Inés Bergua, Marina Cortelles, Andrea Fernández, Andrea Corral, Salma Solaun) won three gold medals (in all group events) at the 2026 European Championships in Varna. Spain thus repeated its achievement from the 2025 European Championships, becoming the first group in the modern era to win all group gold medals at two consecutive European Championships. They were 4th in team competition together with individual gymnasts Alba Bautista and Daniela Picó. In July, they won bronze medal in all-around behind Brazil and China at Milan World Cup and gold medal in 5 Ball final.
