= Marina Cortelles =

Spanish rhythmic gymnast (born 2007)

- Born: 31 March 2007 (age 19) Silla, Spain

Gymnastics career
- Discipline: Rhythmic gymnastics
- Country represented: Spain; (2020-present)
- Head coaches: Alejandra Quereda, Ana María Pelaz
Medal record
Rhythmic Gymnastics
Representing Spain
Event	1st	2nd	3rd
World Championships	1	1	2
European Championships	6	0	0
FIG World Cup	8	3	2
Total	15	4	4
World Championships
Gold medal – first place	2026 Frankfurt	Group All-Around
Silver medal – second place	2026 Frankfurt	3 Hoops + 4 Clubs
Bronze medal – third place	2025 Rio de Janeiro	Group All-Around
Bronze medal – third place	2025 Rio de Janeiro	5 Ribbons
European Championships
Gold medal – first place	2025 Tallinn	Group All-around
Gold medal – first place	2025 Tallinn	5 Ribbons
Gold medal – first place	2025 Tallinn	3 Balls + 2 Hoops
Gold medal – first place	2026 Varna	Group All-around
Gold medal – first place	2026 Varna	5 Balls
Gold medal – first place	2026 Varna	3 Hoops + 4 Clubs

Marina Cortelles (born 31 March 2007) is a Spanish rhythmic gymnast. She is the 2026 World Group all-around champion, the 2025 World group all-around bronze medalist and a two-time (2025, 2026) European Group all-around champion.

== Career ==
In December 2019, Cortelles was selected for a national control training among gymnasts born in 2006 and 2007.

=== Junior ===
In the first months of 2021, she was included into the rooster of the Spanish junior group. In 2021, she took silver at the Spanish Championships among juniors.

The following year she was confirmed into the national team, as an individual. In March she won gold with hoop in the junior international tournament Andalucía Cup. Later she won gold with hoop and ribbon, as well as with her club, in the first round of the second division of the Spanish club championship. At the Spanish school championships she won gold in teams and with hoop. In May she was selected for the COMEGYM in Mersin, winning silver with ribbon and bronze with hoop. In June she took part in the European Championships in Tel Aviv, being 6th in the junior ribbon final. She then took bronze at nationals. At the San Marino international tournament she took silver in the junior category behind Liliana Lewinska. In November she won gold with hoop and with ribbon at the last round of the club championships.

=== Senior ===
She became a senior in 2023, debuting in the Italian club championship with Ginnastica Tarranuova. She then competed in an international tournament in Ourense. In December she won gold with hoop, silver with ribbon and in the All-Around at a tournament in Oviedo. In 2024 Marina was 8th at the Ourense international tournament. In April she was 33rd at the Sofia International Tournament.

In 2025, she was included in the Spanish senior group, making her debut at the World Cup in Sofia where Spain won gold overall and with 3 balls and 2 hoops. In May they won silver in the All-Around and with 5 hoops, as well as bronze in the mixed event, at the stage in Portimão. Selected for the European Championships in Tallinn, she helped the group win gold in the All-Around for the first time in 33 years, winning gold in the two event finals too. In July, group won gold medals in all-around and both apparatus finals at the World Challenge Cup in Cluj-Napoca. In August, the group competed at the 2025 World Championships in Rio de Janeiro, Brazil, winning bronze medals in group all-around and 5 ribbons. They took 4th place in 3 balls + 2 hoops final and finished 8th in team competition together with Alba Bautista and Lucia González.

The group debuted the following year at the 2026 World Cup in Sofia, being 11th overall, 15th with 5 balls and 11th with 3 hoops & 4 clubs. In April they won silver in the All-Around and gold with 3 hoops & 4 clubs in Baku. They took 7th place in 5 balls final. Next, they competed at World Challenge Cup in Portimão, taking gold in 5 balls and bronze in 3 hoops + 4 clubs final. On May 27-31, Marina and her teammates (Inés Bergua, Andrea Corral, Andrea Fernández, Lucía Muñoz, Salma Solaun) won three gold medals (in all group events) at the 2026 European Championships in Varna. Spain thus repeated its achievement from the 2025 European Championships, becoming the first group in the modern era to win all group gold medals at two consecutive European Championships. They were 4th in team competition together with individual gymnasts Alba Bautista and Daniela Picó. In July, they won bronze medal in all-around behind Brazil and China at Milan World Cup and gold medal in 5 Ball final.
