= Andrea Fernández (gymnast) =

Spanish rhythmic gymnast (born 2006)

- Born: 16 February 2006 (age 20) Logroño, Spain

Gymnastics career
- Discipline: Rhythmic gymnastics
- Country represented: Spain; (2022-present)
- Club: Club Ritmo
- Head coaches: Alejandra Quereda, Ana María Pelaz
- Former coach: Ruth Fernández Menéndez
Medal record
Rhythmic Gymnastics
Representing Spain
Event	1st	2nd	3rd
World Championships	1	1	2
European Championships	6	0	0
FIG World Cup	8	3	2
Total	15	4	4
World Championships
Gold medal – first place	2026 Frankfurt	Group All-Around
Silver medal – second place	2026 Frankfurt	3 Hoops + 4 Clubs
Bronze medal – third place	2025 Rio de Janeiro	5 Ribbons
Bronze medal – third place	2025 Rio de Janeiro	Group All-Around
European Championships
Gold medal – first place	2025 Tallinn	Group All-around
Gold medal – first place	2025 Tallinn	5 Ribbons
Gold medal – first place	2025 Tallinn	3 Balls + 2 Hoops
Gold medal – first place	2026 Varna	Group All-around
Gold medal – first place	2026 Varna	5 Balls
Gold medal – first place	2026 Varna	3 Hoops + 4 Clubs

Andrea Fernández (born 16 February 2006) is a Spanish rhythmic gymnast. She is the 2026 World Group all-around champion, the 2025 World group all-around bronze medalist and a two-time (2025, 2026) European Group all-around champion.

== Career ==
Andrea started practicing rhythmic gymnastics at age 3 at Club Ritmo de León.

In 2018, she won gold with clubs at the Spanish Championships in the children's category.

=== Junior ===
She was part of Spanish junior group that competed at the 2021 Junior European Championships in Varna, Bulgaria. They took 9th place in group all-around and 8th place in 5 balls final.

=== Senior ===
In 2022, she was selected for the Spanish national team. Alongside her teammate Andrea Corral, she was named Best Female Athlete of the Year (2022) by the Gymnastics Federation of Castile and León.

In December 2023, she was selected for the Spanish senior national team.

In 2025, after Patricia Pérez and Ana Arnau retired, she made it into the starting 5. In April, she and Inés Bergua, Marina Cortelles, Andrea Corral, Lucía Muñoz, and Salma Solaun made their debut at the World Cup in Sofia, winning gold in the All-Around and with 3 balls & 2 hoops. A week later they performed exhibitions of their routines in Ourense. In May, they won silver in the All-Around and with 5 hoops, as well as bronze in the mixed event, at the stage in Portimão. Selected for the European Championships in Tallinn, she helped the group win gold in the All-Around for the first time in 33 years, in addition to winning gold in the two event finals. In July, group won gold medals in all-around and both apparatus finals at the World Challenge Cup in Cluj-Napoca. In August, the group competed at the 2025 World Championships in Rio de Janeiro, Brazil, winning bronze medals in group all-around and 5 ribbons. They took 4th place in 3 balls + 2 hoops final and finished 8th in team competition together with Alba Bautista and Lucia González.

The group debuted the following year at the 2026 World Cup in Sofia, being 11th overall, 15th with 5 balls and 11th with 3 hoops & 4 clubs. In April they won silver in the All-Around and gold with 3 hoops & 4 clubs in Baku. They took 7th place in 5 balls final. Next, they competed at World Challenge Cup in Portimão, taking gold in 5 balls and bronze in 3 hoops + 4 clubs final. On May 27-31, Andrea and her teammates (Inés Bergua, Marina Cortelles, Andrea Corral, Lucía Muñoz, Salma Solaun) won three gold medals (in all group events) at the 2026 European Championships in Varna. Spain thus repeated its achievement from the 2025 European Championships, becoming the first group in the modern era to win all group gold medals at two consecutive European Championships. They were 4th in team competition together with individual gymnasts Alba Bautista and Daniela Picó. In July, they won bronze medal in all-around behind Brazil and China at Milan World Cup and gold medal in 5 Ball final.
