= Varvara Chubarova =

Ukrainian rhythmic gymnast

- Варвара Чубарова
- Born: 4 October 2011 (age 15) Dnipro, Ukraine

Gymnastics career
- Discipline: Rhythmic gymnastics
- Country represented: Ukraine; (2024–present)
- Head coach: Irina Deriugina
- Assistant coach: Olga Fesenko
Medal record
Rhythmic Gymnastics
Representing Ukraine
Junior European Championships
Silver medal – second place	2026 Varna	Team
Bronze medal – third place	2026 Varna	Ball

Varvara Chubarova (Ukrainian: Варвара Чубарова; born 4 October 2011) is a Ukrainian rhythmic gymnast. She represents Ukraine in international competitions.

== Career ==
=== Junior ===
At the 2024 Ukrainian Championships Chubarova won gold with hoop and silver with ball among juniors. The following year she won bronze in the All-Around, silver with hoop and with ball and gold with clubs and ribbon at the 2025 Happy Cup in Ghent.

In May 2026 she performed with ribbon at the European Cup in Baku, being 4th in teams and 6th with ribbon. She was then selected for the European Championships in Varna, winning bronze, behind Kira Babkevich and Melissa Diete, in the ball final and in teams alongside Sofiia Krainska and Sofiia Kulikova. After she medalled she spoke about how hard it was to train in her native Dnipro under Russian heavy bombing, her and Krainska decided to cover their eyes and wear headphones during the Russian and Belarussian's anthems in protest of the end of the neutrality rules.

== Routine music information ==
Year	Apparatus	Music title
2026	Hoop	
2026	Ball	
2026	Clubs	
2026	Ribbon	Chandelier (Piano Version) by Sia
