= Simarro =

Simarro is a surname. Notable people with the surname include:

- Juan Antonio Simarro (born 1973), Spanish composer, interpreter, and producer
- Luis Simarro Lacabra (1851–1921), Spanish neurologist

== See also ==
- Simaro
