= Inés Bergua =

Spanish rhythmic gymnast (born 2004)

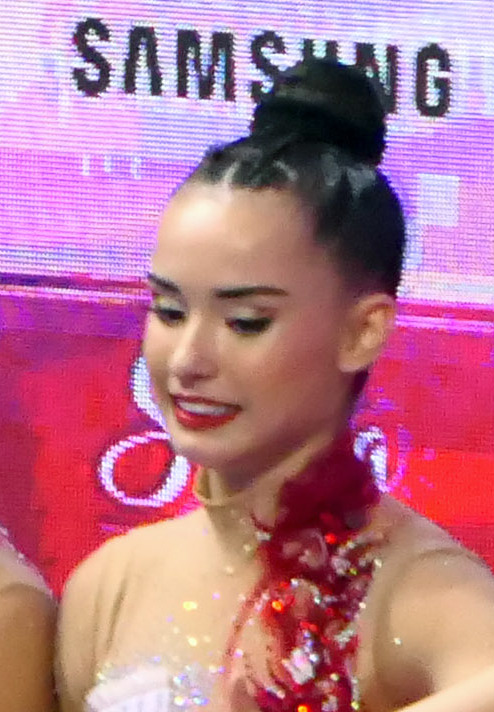
- Bergua in 2024

Personal information
- Full name: Inés Bergua Navales
- Born: 29 May 2004 (age 22) Huesca, Spain

Gymnastics career
- Discipline: Rhythmic gymnastics
- Country represented: Spain; (2017-)
- Club: Club 90
- Head coaches: Alejandra Quereda, Ana María Pelaz
Medal record
Event	1st	2nd	3rd
World Championships	1	2	6
European Championships	7	2	2
FIG World Cup	5	6	5
Total	13	10	13
Rhythmic Gymnastics
Representing Spain
World Championships
Gold medal – first place	2026 Frankfurt	Group All Around
Silver medal – second place	2023 Valencia	5 Hoops
Silver medal – second place	2026 Frankfurt	3 Hoops + 4 Clubs
Bronze medal – third place	2022 Sofia	Team
Bronze medal – third place	2022 Sofia	Group All Around
Bronze medal – third place	2022 Sofia	5 Hoops
Bronze medal – third place	2023 Valencia	Group All Around
Bronze medal – third place	2025 Rio de Janeiro	Group All-Around
Bronze medal – third place	2025 Rio de Janeiro	5 Ribbons
European Championships
Gold medal – first place	2024 Budapest	3 Ribbons + 2 Balls
Gold medal – first place	2025 Tallinn	Group All-around
Gold medal – first place	2025 Tallinn	5 Ribbons
Gold medal – first place	2025 Tallinn	3 Balls + 2 Hoops
Gold medal – first place	2026 Varna	Group All-around
Gold medal – first place	2026 Varna	5 Balls
Gold medal – first place	2026 Varna	3 Hoops + 4 Clubs
Silver medal – second place	2022 Tel Aviv	3 Ribbons + 2 Balls
Silver medal – second place	2024 Budapest	5 Hoops
Bronze medal – third place	2023 Baku	3 Ribbons + 2 Balls
Bronze medal – third place	2024 Budapest	Group All-Around

Inés Bergua Navales (Note: In this Spanish name, the first or paternal surname is Bergua and the second or maternal family name is Navales.) (born 29 May 2004) is a Spanish rhythmic gymnast. She is the 2026 World Group all-around champion, a three-time (2022, 2023, 2025) World Group all-around bronze medalist and a two-time (2025, 2026) European Group all-around champion.

== Personal life ==
Inés took up the sport at age three influenced by her aunt. She was named the 2015 Most Promising Female Athlete of the Year at the Aragon Provincial Sports Gala, 2019 Female Athlete of the Year in Aragon, this award was presented in 2021, and Best Individual Athlete of the Women and Sports Awards 2022. Her biggest dream is to win a medal at the 2024 Olympic Games.

== Career ==
=== Junior ===
Bergua was part of the Spanish junior group that competed at both the 2019 European and World Championships, finishing 7th in all-around in Baku and 5th in Moscow.

=== Senior ===
==== 2021 ====
In 2021 Inés participated in the World Championships along Valeria Márquez, Ana Gayan, Patricia Pérez, Uma Mendez Gonzalez and Mireia Martínez, finishing 12th in the All-Around and 5th in the 3 hoops + 4 clubs' final.

==== 2022 ====
The group debuted in 2022 at the World Cup in Sofia, they were 5th in the All-Around and 5 hoops and 6th with 3 ribbons + 2 balls. In Baku they were 12th in the All-Around and therefore didn't qualify for event finals. A month later in Pamplona they won bronze in the All-Around and silver with 5 hoops. In Portimão they won 3 silver medals. They won All-Around bronze and 5 hoops and silver with 3 ribbons + 2 balls in Cluj-Napoca. Inés took part, with Ana Arnau, Valeria Márquez, Patricia Pérez, Mireia Martínez and Salma Solaun in the 2022 European Championships in Tel Aviv, winning silver in the 3 ribbons + 2 balls final, and the World Championships in Sofia where the Spanish group won three bronze medals: All-Around (earning them a spot for the 2024 Olympics), 5 hoops, and team.

==== 2023 ====
In 2023 Inés and the group debuted at the World Cup in Sofia, taking 11th place overall and 8th with 3 ribbons & 2 balls. A week later they competed at the Grand Prix in Thiais. In April the group took part in the World Cup in Baku, being 10th in the All-Around and 8th with 5 hoops. In Portimão they won gold in the All-Around and silver with 5 hoops. At the European Championships in Baku the group finished 6th overall, 4th with 5 hoops and won bronze in the mixed event. After a training camp in Alicante Salma was selected for the World Championships in Valencia, there along Ana Arnau, Salma Solaun, Mireia Martínez and Patricia Pérez, she took bronze in the All-Around and silver with 5 hoops.

==== 2024 ====
The first competition of the group in 2024 was the World Cup in Athens, where they took 4th place in the All-Around, 8th with 5 hoops and 7th with 3 ribbons & 2 balls. Weeks later, in Sofia they won silver with 5 balls, in Baku the group won gold in the All-Around and silver with 3 ribbons & 2 balls. In May she won gold in the All-Around and with 5 hoops as well as bronze in the mixed event at the stage in Portimão. At the European Championships in Budapest the Spanish group won bronze in the All-Around, silver with 5 hoops and gold with 3 ribbons & 2 balls. At the last World Cup of the season, in Cluj-Napoca, they won gold in the mixed event final.

In early August Inés, Ana Arnau, Salma Solaun, Mireia Martínez and Patricia Pérez competed in the Olympic Games in Paris, where they took 10th place in the qualification event and thus not advancing to the final.

==== 2025 ====
In 2025, she continued in the group, debuting with a new formation along Andrea Corral, Marina Cortelles, Andrea Fernández, Lucía Muñoz and Salma Solaun, at the World Cup in Sofia winning gold in the All-Around and with 3 balls & 2 hoops. A week later they performed exhibitions of their routines in Ourense. In May, they took part in the World Cup in Portimão. Selected for the European Championships in Tallinn, she helped the group win gold in the All-Around for the first time in 33 years, winning gold in the two event finals too. In July, group won gold medals in all-around and both apparatus finals at the World Challenge Cup in Cluj-Napoca. In August, the group competed at the 2025 World Championships in Rio de Janeiro, Brazil, winning bronze medals in group all-around and 5 ribbons. They took 4th place in 3 balls + 2 hoops final and finished 8th in team competition together with Alba Bautista and Lucia González.

==== 2026 ====
The group debuted the following year at the World Cup in Sofia, being 11th in all-around, 15th with 5 balls and 11th with 3 hoops & 4 clubs. In April, they won silver in the all-around and gold with 3 hoops + 4 clubs at World Cup Baku. They took 7th place in 5 balls final. Next, they competed at World Challenge Cup in Portimão, taking gold in 5 balls and bronze in 3 hoops + 4 clubs final.

On May 27-31, Inés and her teammates (Andrea Corral, Marina Cortelles, Andrea Fernández, Lucía Muñoz, Salma Solaun) won three gold medals (in all group events) at the 2026 European Championships in Varna. Spain thus repeated its achievement from the 2025 European Championships, becoming the first group in the modern era to win all group gold medals at two consecutive European Championships. They were 4th in team competition together with individual gymnasts Alba Bautista and Daniela Picó. In July, they won bronze medal in all-around behind Brazil and China at Milan World Cup and gold medal in 5 Ball final.
