= 2026 Rhythmic Gymnastics World Championships =

Gymnastics championship edition

- Venue: Festhalle Frankfurt
- Location: Frankfurt, Germany
- Dates: 12–16 August 2026
- Competitors: 300
- Website: https://frankfurt26.de/en/

The 2026 Rhythmic Gymnastics World Championships was held in Frankfurt, Germany. The event was held at Festhalle Frankfurt, and 300 athletes competed.

The championships acted as a qualification event for the 2028 Summer Olympics in Los Angeles. The 3 highest-ranked individuals from the all-around competition (final), with a maximum of two gymnasts per National Olympic Committee, and the top 3 groups, obtained one quota place for their country.

In the individual event, the all-around podium was the same as that at the 2025 World Championships: German Darja Varfolomeev won her third consecutive individual all-around title in front of a home crowd, with Bulgarian Stiliana Nikolova winning silver and Italian Sofia Raffaeli winning bronze. In the apparatus finals, Varfolomeev won two additional apparatus gold medals in ball and ribbon, while Taisiia Onofriichuk won her first World title in the hoop final and Nikolova won clubs, the first for a Bulgarian gymnast in 25 years.

In the group event, the Spanish group won gold, followed by the Japanese group and Brazilian group. The Brazilian group won both apparatus finals; this was the first time any gymnast from the Americas won a gold medal at the World championships.

== Participating countries ==
Participants	Nations
Group + 3 individuals	Australia Angola Brazil Bulgaria Canada Germany Russia Ukraine
Group + 2 individuals	Belarus China Cyprus Spain Finland Israel Italy Japan Kazakhstan Kyrgyzstan Mexico Poland Romania United States
Group + 1 individual	Argentina Austria Azerbaijan Chile Czech Republic Estonia France United Kingdom Georgia Greece Hungary South Korea Lithuania Norway Portugal South Africa Slovenia Slovakia Chinese Taipei Turkey Uzbekistan
2 individuals	Egypt
1 individual	Andorra Angola Armenia Bolivia Ivory Coast Costa Rica Croatia Cuba El Salvador Guatemala India Laos Latvia Lebanon Luxembourg Moldova North Macedonia Montenegro Namibia New Zealand Philippines Puerto Rico Singapore San Marino Serbia Switzerland Sweden Syria Togo Venezuela

For the first time since the 2022 Russian invasion of Ukraine, Russian and Belarusian athletes were allowed to compete. Shortly before the 2026 European Championships, they began to compete at gymnastics events with their national flags and anthems; however, it was announced 6 August that they would compete at the World Championships under a neutral flag and music due to opposition from the German government, which financially supported the event.

== Schedule ==
- Wednesday, August 12
  - 09:00 - 16:00 Individual Qualification (Group A-D) - Hoop and Ball
  - 16:15 - 22:30 Individual Qualification (Group E-H) - Clubs and Ribbon
- Thursday, August 13
  - 09:00 - 16:00 Individual Qualification (Group A-D) - Clubs and Ribbon
  - 16:15 - 22:30 Individual Qualification (Group E-H) - Hoop and Ball
- Friday, August 14
  - 16:00 - 20:40 Individual All Around Final
- Saturday, August 15
  - 11:00 - 17:45 Group All Around
- Sunday, August 16
  - 11:00 - 11:45 Group 5 Balls Final
  - 12:10 - 12:45 Individual Hoop Final
  - 12:50 - 13:25 Individual Ball Final
  - 14:00 - 14:45 Group 3 Hoops + 2 Pairs of Clubs Final
  - 15:10 - 15:45 Individual Clubs Final
  - 15:50 - 16:25 Individual Ribbon Final

== Medal summary ==
Event	Gold	Silver	Bronze
Team Competition
Team All-Around	(Individual Neutral Athletes) WG2; Individuals; Maria Borisova; Sofia Ilteriakova; Group; Agata Barekzay; Alisa Eremeeva; Arina Lavrenova; Daria Melnik; Anna Nikolaeva; Sofiia Solonskaia	Bulgaria; Individuals; Eva Brezalieva; Stiliana Nikolova; Group; Raya Bozhilova; Magdalina Minevska; Magdalena Valkova; Emilia Obretenova; Rachel Stoyanov; Margarita Vasileva	China; Individuals; Wang Zilu; Wang Qi; Group; Ding Xinyi; Liu Miaoting; Pu Yanzhu; Wang Lanjing; Zhang Xinyi; Wanzhu Zhao
Individual Finals
All-Around	(Germany) Darja Varfolomeev	(Bulgaria) Stiliana Nikolova	(Italy) Sofia Raffaeli
Hoop	(Ukraine) Taisiia Onofriichuk	(Italy) Sofia Raffaeli	(Germany) Darja Varfolomeev
Ball	(Germany) Darja Varfolomeev	(Russia) Sofia Ilteriakova	(Russia) Maria Borisova
Clubs	(Bulgaria) Stiliana Nikolova	(Ukraine) Taisiia Onofriichuk	(Russia) Maria Borisova
Ribbon	(Germany) Darja Varfolomeev	(Bulgaria) Stiliana Nikolova	(Russia) Maria Borisova
Groups Finals
Group All-Around	Spain; Ines Bergua; Andrea Corral; Marina Cortelles; Andrea Fernández; Lucía Muñoz; Salma Solaun	Japan; Natsumi Hanamura; Rin Manabe; Megumi Nishimoto; Hisano Taguchi; Kaseno Tanabe; Yuna Tanaka	Brazil; Maria Eduarda Arakaki; Maria Paula Caminha; Mariana Vitória Gonçalves; Julia Kurunczi; Sofia Pereira; Nicole Pircio
5 Balls	Brazil; Maria Eduarda Arakaki; Maria Paula Caminha; Mariana Vitória Gonçalves; Julia Kurunczi; Sofia Pereira; Nicole Pircio*	China; Ding Xinyi; Liu Miaoting*; Pu Yanzhu; Wang Lanjing; Zhang Xinyi; Wanzhu Zhao	Bulgaria; Raya Bozhilova; Magdalina Minevska; Magdalena Valkova*; Emilia Obretenova; Rachel Stoyanov; Margarita Vasileva
3 Hoops + 2 Clubs	Brazil; Maria Eduarda Arakaki; Maria Paula Caminha; Mariana Vitória Gonçalves; Julia Kurunczi*; Sofia Pereira; Nicole Pircio	Spain; Ines Bergua; Andrea Corral; Marina Cortelles; Andrea Fernández*; Lucía Muñoz; Salma Solaun	Bulgaria; Raya Bozhilova; Magdalina Minevska; Magdalena Valkova; Emilia Obretenova; Rachel Stoyanov*; Margarita Vasileva

* reserve gymnast

== Individual ==
=== Individual Qualification ===
- The top 8 scores in individual apparatus qualify to the apparatus finals and the top 18 in overall qualification scores advance to the all-around final.

Rank	Gymnast	Nation	Hoop (rhythmic gymnastics)	Ball (rhythmic gymnastics)	Clubs (rhythmic gymnastics)	Ribbon (rhythmic gymnastics)	Total	!
1	Darja Varfolomeev	Germany	29.250	29.700	27.950	30.050	89.000	Q
2	Stiliana Nikolova	Bulgaria	29.800	27.100	29.250	28.300	87.350	Q
3	Maria Borisova	(Individual Neutral Athletes) WG2	28.850	28.400	29.050	29.000	86.900	Q
4	Sofiia Ilteriakova	(Individual Neutral Athletes) WG2	26.250	28.050	29.300	28.250	85.600	Q
5	Sofia Raffaeli	Italy	30.100	28.450	26.450	26.250	85.000	Q
6	Megan Chu	United States	28.500	27.500	28.350	27.800	84.650	Q
7	Alina Harnasko	(Individual Neutral Athletes) WG1	27.400	28.200	25.900	28.800	84.400	Q
8	Akmaral Yerekesheva	Kazakhstan	25.700	26.850	29.000	28.350	84.200	Q
9	Wang Zilu	China	28.350	28.100	27.750	25.850	84.200	Q
10	Wang Qi	China	27.450	27.300	28.600	27.800	83.850	Q
11	Rin Keys	United States	27.350	25.450	28.400	27.750	83.500	Q
12	Taisiia Onofriichuk	Ukraine	28.650	25.800	28.250	26.250	83.150	Q
13	Daniela Munits	Israel	29.450	26.900	26.650	26.100	83.000	Q
14	Meital Maayan Sumkin	Israel	28.100	27.150	24.450	27.350	82.600	Q
15	Tara Dragas	Italy	28.150	28.450	25.750	25.500	82.350	Q
16	Bárbara Domingos	Brazil	27.650	26.500	27.350	27.300	82.300	Q
17	Vera Tugolukova	Cyprus	26.500	27.850	27.650	26.600	82.100	Q
18	Takhmina Ikromova	Uzbekistan	28.950	26.050	26.750	26.200	81.900	Q
19	Daniela Picó	Spain	26.950	26.000	27.850	26.650	81.450	R1
20	Liliana Lewinska	Poland	28.000	25.400	27.850	23.000-	81.250	R2
21	Eva Brezalieva	Bulgaria	27.350	25.850	26.750	27.050	81.150	R3
22	Mirano Kita	Japan	27.900	23.750	26.550	26.600	81.050	R4
23	Polina Karika	Ukraine	27.550	26.700	26.600	26.550	80.850	
24	Aibota Yertaikyzy	Kazakhstan	28.300	25.250	27.100	25.050	80.650	
25	Amalia Lica	Romania	27.500	24.900	26.550	25.750	79.800	
26	Naruha Suzuki	Japan	26.700	25.400	26.700	26.250	79.650	
27	Seo Eun-chae	South Korea	27.250	26.400	25.700	24.700	79.350	
28	Zlata Arkatova	Kyrgyzstan	26.050	20.250	26.300	27.000	79.350	
29	Emilia Heichel	Poland	26.150	24.400	26.800	26.150	79.100	
30	Andreea Verdes	Romania	26.400	25.250	26.100	26.250	78.750	
31	Darya Viarenich	(Individual Neutral Athletes) WG1	28.200	26.300	24.050		78.550	
32	Lia Kallio	Finland	23.600	25.100	26.450	26.700	78.250	
33	Miyabi Akiya	Australia	26.750	23.150	26.750	24.300	77.800	
34	Maena Millon	France	25.800	26.000	25.000	24.250	76.800	
35	Hatice Gokce Emir	Turkey	24.800	26.100	23.100	25.750	76.650	
36	Fanni Pigniczki	Hungary	26.500	26.950	23.100	22.650	76.550	
37	Alba Bautista	Spain	26.650	24.950	24.750	22.750	76.350	
38	Lauren Grueniger	Switzerland	25.850	25.200	25.150	24.450	76.200	
39	Jasmine Althea Ramilo	Philippines	26.100	25.400	24.600	24.300	76.100	
40	Havana Hopman	New Zealand	25.950	25.150	24.950	24.350	76.050	
41	Lada Pusch	Germany	26.150	24.050	25.200		75.400	
42	Mikayla Angeline Yang	Singapore	25.550	22.750	25.000	24.850	75.400	
43	Fidan Gurbanli	Azerbaijan	21.750	25.000	26.350	24.000	75.350	
44	Emmi Piiroinen	Finland	26.200	24.300	24.350	23.950	74.850	
45	Mariami Kajaia	Georgia	25.550	22.300	24.500	24.500	74.550	
46	Anna Karolina Obolonina	Estonia	24.850	24.250	24.850	24.850	74.550	
47	Nijole Mickute	Lithuania	25.400	21.600	24.650	24.450	74.500	
48	Panagiota Lytra	Greece	25.300	24.450	24.450	23.650	74.200	
49	Lina Heleika	Egypt	26.150	23.350	19.700	24.450	74.150	
50	Sofia Hemmings	Australia	25.250	23.400	25.400		74.050	
51	Farida Bahnas	Egypt	24.400	25.300	23.500	20.000	73.200	
52	Ana Luisa Abraham	Mexico	22.950	24.650	25.500	22.300	73.100	
53	Josephine Juul Møller	Norway	25.200	23.350	24.050	22.900	72.600	
54	Alja Ponikvar	Slovenia	22.500	23.050	25.550	23.750	72.350	
55	Rita Araujo	Portugal	22.950	24.750	22.950	24.450	72.150	
56	Celeste D'Arcangelo	Argentina	25.250	23.150	21.200	23.150	71.550	
57	Marina Malpica	Mexico	23.600	24.500	23.250	23.450	71.550	
58	Maria Avgousti	Cyprus	25.700	23.350	22.450	20.850	71.500	
59	Dina Mironskaya	Austria	24.450	23.950	23.000	22.650	71.400	
60	Asel Arapova	Kyrgyzstan	20.900	20.800	26.000	24.150	71.050	
61	Jana Alemam	Canada	25.050	22.950	22.900	19.650	70.900	
62	Elizabeth Popova	United Kingdom	22.550	23.700	24.300	21.800	70.550	
63	Pin Rong Lee	Canada	24.850	21.150	22.650	21.200	68.700	
64	Nina Dragovic	Montenegro	23.650	17.700	24.650	19.900	68.200	
65	Sofia Bulat	Moldova	24.500	21.500	22.050	21.600	68.150	
66	Nikola Novakova	Czech Republic	22.850	22.450	21.900	22.650	67.950	
67	Luana Gomes	Angola	22.300	22.700	20.350	22.550	67.550	
68	Kotryna Zilionyte	Luxembourg	23.700	21.050	21.950	21.650	67.300	
69	Berta Miquel	Andorra	23.150	20.300	20.150	23.250	66.700	
70	Maša Nikolić	Serbia	23.850	21.500	18.400	20.300	65.650	
71	Tereza Saranova	Slovakia	21.450	21.050	22.950	20.650	65.450	
72	Pin-Chen Liu	Chinese Taipei	21.550	20.200	23.300	19.600	65.050	
73	Maria Daniella Gonzalez	Guatemala	20.350	21.500	22.150	21.100	64.750	
74	Stephanie Dimitrova	South Africa	21.550	21.850	21.050	19.800	64.450	
75	Milena Asriian	Armenia	22.250	20.850	20.750	21.000	64.100	
76	Jimena Dominguez	Venezuela	22.200	19.400	20.600	20.650	63.450	
77	Evelina Ivanova	Latvia	19.350	20.050	22.850	20.400	63.300	
78	Eva Bombagioni	San Marino	20.750	20.750	21.550	20.600	63.050	
79	Parina Rahul Madanpotra	India	21.500	20.500	20.650	20.750	62.900	
80	Gloriana Sanchez	Costa Rica	21.050	19.150	20.600	19.800	61.450	
81	Mayte Guzman	Bolivia	21.050	19.500	18.450	20.700	61.250	
82	Josefine Engstrand	Sweden	19.550	20.350	17.300	19.650	59.550	
83	Josefa Cornejo	Chile	16.900	16.250	19.900	21.700	58.500	
84	Viva Oduber	Aruba	19.250	16.700	21.700	16.550	57.650	
85	Praewa Misato Philaphandeth	Laos	19.900	16.700	18.600	19.00	57.500	
86	Talya Elkhayat	Syria	19.000	17.550	17.700	19.450	56.150	
87	Anais Ossonon	Ivory Coast	17.550	19.500	16.100	18.250	55.300	
88	Danna Cortes	Puerto Rico	18.700	16.700	17.900	16.750	53.350	
89	Sol Solorzano	El Salvador	19.300	16.400	14.900	17.400	53.100	
90	Ilina Sokolovska	North Macedonia	18.150	15.900	17.500	16.050	51.700	
91	Emilia Ekandjo	Namibia	16.450	12.000	15.800	17.650	49.900	
92	Mathilde Maggioli	Togo	16.000	15.350	16.650	16.500	49.150	
93	Luna Birjawi	Lebanon	13.950	13.150	14.200	13.950	42.100	
94	Isabella Rojas	Cuba	DNS	DNS	18.400	18.350	DNF	

=== All-Around Final ===
Germany's Darja Varfolomeev won the individual all-around title for the third consecutive World Championships, scoring 119.500 points. She finished ahead of Bulgaria's Stiliana Nikolova and Italy's Sofia Raffaeli. The victory was Varfolomeev's 12th World Championship gold medal.

Rank	Gymnast	Nation	Hoop (rhythmic gymnastics)	Ball (rhythmic gymnastics)	Clubs (rhythmic gymnastics)	Ribbon (rhythmic gymnastics)	Total
1st place, gold medalist(s)	Darja Varfolomeev	Germany	28.300	30.050 (1)	31.500 (1)	29.650 (1)	119.500
2nd place, silver medalist(s)	Stiliana Nikolova	Bulgaria	30.150 (3)	29.250 (2)	29.000	29.200 (2)	117.600
3rd place, bronze medalist(s)	Sofia Raffaeli	Italy	30.400 (2)	28.250 (9)	30.250 (2)	28.650 (5)	117.550
4	Taisiia Onofriichuk	Ukraine	29.100 (10)	28.700 (4)	29.750 (6)	28.500 (8)	116.050
5	Maria Borisova	(Individual Neutral Athletes) WG2	29.700 (6)	27.750	29.500 (7)	29.050 (3)	116.000
6	Akmaral Yerekesheva	Kazakhstan	29.550 (8)	28.350 (6)	30.050 (3)	27.850	115.800
7	Daniela Munits	Israel	30.500 (1)	27.750	30.050 (3)	27.350	115.650
8	Rin Keys	United States	28.650	27.900 (10)	29.300 (8)	28.650 (4)	114.500
9	Alina Harnasko	(Individual Neutral Athletes) WG1	29.150 (9)	28.450 (5)	28.200	28.100	113.900
10	Wang Qi	China	28.350	28.250 (8)	28.600	28.000	113.200
11	Megan Chu	United States	29.850 (5)	25.950	28.750	28.600 (7)	113.150
12	Sofiia Ilteriakova	(Individual Neutral Athletes) WG2	29.600 (7)	25.100	29.800 (5)	28.650 (6)	113.150
13	Takhmina Ikromova	Uzbekistan	30.000 (4)	26.750	28.350	27.450	112.550
14	Vera Tugolukova	Cyprus	28.900	27.000	29.250 (9)	27.350	112.500
15	Wang Zilu	China	28.100	27.050	28.800	28.200 (10)	112.150
16	Tara Dragas	Italy	26.250	28.350 (7)	29.050 (10)	27.100	110.750
17	Meital Maayan Sumkin	Israel	26.300	28.950 (3)	23.050	28.350 (9)	106.650
18	Bárbara Domingos	Brazil	28.250	23.550	27.250	27.250	106.300

=== Hoop ===
Rank	Gymnast	Nation	D Score	E Score	A Score	Pen.	Total
1st place, gold medalist(s)	Taisiia Onofriichuk	Ukraine	14.100	8.300	8.300		30.700
2nd place, silver medalist(s)	Sofia Raffaeli	Italy	13.700	8.400	8.400		30.500
3rd place, bronze medalist(s)	Darja Varfolomeev	Germany	13.600	8.500	8.300		30.400
4	Daniela Munits	Israel	13.600	8.350	8.100		30.050
5	Takhmina Ikromova	Uzbekistan	13.700	8.050	8.250		30.000
6	Megan Chu	United States	12.500	8.300	7.900		28.700
7	Stiliana Nikolova	Bulgaria	11.800	8.100	8.150		28.050
8	Maria Borisova	(Individual Neutral Athletes) WG2	11.900	7.350	7.450	0.600	26.100

=== Ball ===
Rank	Gymnast	Nation	D Score	E Score	A Score	Pen.	Total
1st place, gold medalist(s)	Darja Varfolomeev	Germany	13.300	8.500	8.550		30.350
2nd place, silver medalist(s)	Sofiia Ilteriakova	(Individual Neutral Athletes) WG2	13.400	8.200	8.200		29.800
3rd place, bronze medalist(s)	Maria Borisova	(Individual Neutral Athletes) WG2	12.600	8.250	8.300		29.150
4	Tara Dragas	Italy	12.800	7.900	8.100		28.800
5	Sofia Raffaeli	Italy	12.200	8.050	8.250	0.050	28.450
6	Vera Tugolukova	Cyprus	11.100	7.550	8.100		26.750
7	Wang Zilu	China	9.900	7.300	7.500	0.300	24.400
8	Alina Harnasko	(Individual Neutral Athletes) WG1	10.000	7.150	7.500	0.300	24.350

=== Clubs ===
Rank	Gymnast	Nation	D Score	E Score	A Score	Pen.	Total
1st place, gold medalist(s)	Stiliana Nikolova	Bulgaria	13.400	8.400	8.350		30.150
2nd place, silver medalist(s)	Taisiia Onofriichuk	Ukraine	13.400	8.350	8.300		30.050
3rd place, bronze medalist(s)	Maria Borisova	(Individual Neutral Athletes) WG2	13.500	8.300	8.250		30.050
4	Rin Keys	United States	13.200	8.350	8.250		29.800
5	Akmaral Yerekesheva	Kazakhstan	13.100	8.300	8.000		29.400
6	Sofiia Ilteriakova	(Individual Neutral Athletes) WG2	13.400	7.800	8.100		29.300
7	Wang Qi	China	12.200	7.600	7.950		27.750
8	Megan Chu	United States	12.200	7.000	7.850		27.050

=== Ribbon ===
Rank	Gymnast	Nation	D Score	E Score	A Score	Pen.	Total
1st place, gold medalist(s)	Darja Varfolomeev	Germany	13.400	8.550	8.550		30.500
2nd place, silver medalist(s)	Stiliana Nikolova	Bulgaria	13.500	8.500	8.450		30.450
3rd place, bronze medalist(s)	Maria Borisova	(Individual Neutral Athletes) WG2	13.300	8.400	8.200		29.900
4	Sofiia Ilteriakova	(Individual Neutral Athletes) WG2	13.600	8.300	8.000		29.900
5	Megan Chu	United States	12.700	8.350	8.000		29.050
6	Alina Harnasko	(Individual Neutral Athletes) WG1	11.900	8.300	8.350		28.550
7	Wang Qi	China	12.100	8.300	8.100		28.500
8	Akmaral Yerekesheva	Kazakhstan	11.900	7.800	7.650		27.350

== Group ==
The top 8 scores in each apparatus qualify for the group apparatus finals.

Place	Nation	5	3 + 4	Total
1st place, gold medalist(s)	Spain	28.500	28.950	57.450
2nd place, silver medalist(s)	Japan	28.150	28.550	56.700
3rd place, bronze medalist(s)	Brazil	26.800	28.700	55.500
4	Germany	27.700	27.350	55.050
5	Ukraine	27.450	27.450	54.900
6	Bulgaria	26.900	27.700	54.600
7	China	28.150	26.050	54.200
8	France	25.200	26.900	52.100
9	Poland	25.800	26.250	52.050
10	WG1	27.400	24.200	51.600
11	Italy	25.100	26.150	51.250
12	WG2	25.550	25.600	51.150
13	Kazakhstan	24.900	26.150	51.050
14	Israel	23.500	27.350	50.850
15	South Korea	24.100	25.450	49.550
16	Hungary	24.750	24.650	49.400
17	United States	23.300	25.600	48.900
18	Turkey	24.000	24.650	48.650
19	Romania	22.900	24.750	47.650
20	Cyprus	23.350	23.550	46.900
21	Canada	24.000	22.700	46.700
22	Uzbekistan	18.000	27.250	45.250
23	Greece	20.950	24.150	45.100
24	Estonia	19.000	25.350	44.350
25	Mexico	23.650	20.350	44.000
26	Finland	19.100	24.250	43.350
27	Czech Republic	23.050	19.000	42.050
28	Azerbaijan	21.450	20.450	41.900
29	Lithuania	20.300	21.100	41.400
30	Portugal	19.100	22.150	41.250
31	Georgia	21.450	19.650	41.100
32	United Kingdom	19.600	21.300	40.900
33	Slovakia	19.100	21.150	40.250
34	Norway	19.300	20.700	40.000
35	Chile	19.050	20.300	39.350
36	Austria	19.800	19.350	39.150
37	South Africa	18.500	20.350	38.850
38	Chinese Taipei	20.150	17.900	38.050
39	Australia	20.700	16.350	37.050
40	Argentina	15.750	17.500	33.250
41	Slovenia	16.500	16.100	32.600
42	Kyrgyzstan	16.650	14.900	31.550

=== 5 Balls ===
Rank	Nation	D Score	E Score	A Score	Pen.	Total
1st place, gold medalist(s)	Brazil	13.800	7.600	8.050		29.450
2nd place, silver medalist(s)	China	13.500	7.300	8.100		28.900
3rd place, bronze medalist(s)	Bulgaria	13.500	7.100	7.800		28.400
4	Ukraine	13.200	7.300	7.800		28.300
5	Spain	13.300	6.600	7.550		27.450
6	WG1	12.300	6.650	7.400		26.350
7	Japan	12.100	5.950	7.800		25.850
8	Germany	12.000	6.150	7.250		25.400

=== 3 Hoops + 2 Pairs of Clubs ===
Rank	Nation	D Score	E Score	A Score	Pen.	Total
1st place, gold medalist(s)	Brazil	13.900	7.500	8.050		29.450
2nd place, silver medalist(s)	Spain	13.800	7.150	8.100		29.050
3rd place, bronze medalist(s)	Bulgaria	13.600	7.350	7.800		28.750
4	Japan	13.100	7.200	8.000		28.300
5	Israel	13.400	7.200	7.700		28.300
6	Germany	13.000	7.300	7.900		28.200
7	Uzbekistan	13.400	7.050	7.650		28.100
8	Ukraine	12.500	5.550	7.050		25.100

== Team ==
=== Combined Team Ranking ===
Place	Nation	Hoop (rhythmic gymnastics)	Ball (rhythmic gymnastics)	Clubs (rhythmic gymnastics)	Ribbon (rhythmic gymnastics)	5	3 + 4	Total
1st place, gold medalist(s)	WG2	55.100	56.450	58.350	57.250	25.550	25.600	278.300
2nd place, silver medalist(s)	Bulgaria	57.150	52.950	56.000	55.350	26.900	27.700	276.050
3rd place, bronze medalist(s)	China	55.800	55.400	56.350	53.650	28.150	26.050	275.400
4	Germany	55.400	53.750	53.150	54.450	27.700	27.350	271.800
5	Ukraine	56.200	52.500	54.850	52.800	27.450	27.450	271.250
6	Italy	58.250	56.900	52.200	51.750	25.100	26.150	270.350
7	Brazil	53.700	53.950	52.550	54.500	26.800	28.700	270.200
8	United States	55.850	52.950	56.750	55.550	23.300	25.600	270.000
9	WG1	55.600	54.500	49.950	55.900	27.400	24.200	267.550
10	Israel	57.550	54.050	51.100	53.450	23.500	27.350	267.000
11	Kazakhstan	54.000	52.100	56.100	53.400	24.900	26.150	266.650
12	Japan	54.600	49.150	53.250	52.850	28.150	28.550	266.550
13	Spain	53.600	50.950	52.600	49.400	28.500	28.950	264.000
14	Poland	54.150	49.800	54.650	49.150	25.800	26.250	259.800
15	Romania	53.900	50.150	52.650	52.000	22.900	24.750	256.350
16	Cyprus	52.200	51.200	50.100	47.450	23.350	23.550	247.850
17	Finland	49.800	49.400	50.800	50.650	19.100	24.250	244.000
18	Australia	52.000	46.550	52.150	47.550	20.700	16.350	235.300
19	Mexico	46.550	49.150	48.750	45.750	23.650	20.350	234.200
20	Canada	49.900	44.100	45.550	40.850	24.000	22.700	227.100

== Medal table ==
* Host nation (Germany)

Rank	Nation	Gold	Silver	Bronze	Total
1	Germany*	3	0	1	4
2	Brazil	2	0	1	3
3	Bulgaria	1	3	2	6
4	(Individual Neutral Athletes) World Gymnastics 2	1	1	3	5
5	Spain	1	1	0	2
5	Ukraine	1	1	0	2
7	China	0	1	1	2
7	Italy	0	1	1	2
9	Japan	0	1	0	1
Totals (9 entries)		9	9	9	27
