= 2026 Rhythmic Gymnastics European Championships =

- Venue: Palace of Culture and Sports
- Location: Varna, Bulgaria
- Start date: 27 May 2026
- End date: 31 May 2026

The 2026 Rhythmic Gymnastics European Championships was the 42nd edition of the Rhythmic Gymnastics European Championships. The competition took place on 27-31 May 2026 at the Palace of Culture and Sports in Varna, Bulgaria.

The European Championships served as qualification for the 2026 Rhythmic Gymnastics World Championships in Frankfurt later the year.

== Participation ==
=== Dutch team absence ===
The team from the Netherlands did not participate in the European Championships. On 31 March it was announced that due to an error by the Dutch gymnastics federation (KNGU), the Dutch team had not been registered, and they could no longer be entered after the registration deadline had passed.

=== Russia and Belarus ===
For the first time since their disqualification due to the aggressive war against Ukraine, Russian and Belarusian athletes were allowed to compete using their national flags and anthems. Ukraine protested against the decision.

On two occasions (ball and ribbon in junior individual finals), an athlete from Russia or Belarus won the event, with an athlete from Ukraine winning a medal. When the anthem was played, the Ukrainian athletes expressed their protest by covering their eyes with their hands and putting on headphones to show they did not listen to the anthem.

=== Participating countries ===
- Albania
- Andorra
- Armenia
- Austria
- Azerbaijan
- Belgium
- Bosnia and Herzegovina
- Belarus
- Bulgaria
- Croatia
- Cyprus
- Czech Republic
- Spain
- Estonia
- Finland
- France
- Great Britain
- Georgia
- Germany
- Greece
- Hungary
- Israel
- Italy
- Latvia
- Lithuania
- Luxembourg
- Moldova
- North Macedonia
- Malta
- Montenegro
- Norway
- Poland
- Portugal
- Romania
- Russia
- Slovenia
- San Marino
- Serbia
- Switzerland
- Slovakia
- Sweden
- Turkey
- Ukraine

Updated on May 25, 2026.

== Competition schedule ==
- Wednesday, May 27
  - 09:00 – 10:50 Set A – Junior individuals qualifications & Team ranking (Hoop, Ball, Clubs, Ribbon)
  - 11:00 – 12:50 Set B – Junior individuals qualifications & Team ranking (Hoop, Ball, Clubs, Ribbon)
  - 13:30 – 14:00 Opening Ceremony
  - 14:00 – 15:50 Set C – Junior individuals qualifications & Team ranking (Hoop, Ball, Clubs, Ribbon)
  - 16:00 – 17:50 Set D – Junior individuals qualifications & Team ranking (Hoop, Ball, Clubs, Ribbon)
  - 18:00 – 18:20 Award ceremony Junior individuals Team
- Thursday, May 28
  - 09:00 – 10:00 Set A - Senior Individuals qualifications (hoop & ball)
  - 10:00 – 11:00 Set B - Senior Individuals qualifications (hoop & ball)
  - 11:15 – 12:15 Set C - Senior Individuals qualifications (hoop & ball)
  - 12:15 – 13:15 Set D - Senior Individuals qualifications (hoop & ball)
  - 14:15 – 15:15 Set E - Senior Individuals qualifications (hoop & ball)
  - 15:15 – 16:15 Set F - Senior Individuals qualifications (hoop & ball)
  - 16:30 – 17:30 Set G - Senior Individuals qualifications (hoop & ball)
  - 17:30 – 18:30 Set H - Senior Individuals qualifications (hoop & ball)
  - 19:30 – 20:35 Junior Individual Apparatus Final (Hoop & Ball)
  - 20:45 – 21:50 Junior Individual Apparatus Final (Clubs & Ribbon)
  - 21:50 – 22:10 Award Ceremony for Junior Individual Apparatus Finals
- Friday, May 29
  - 09:00 – 10:00 Set E - Senior Individuals qualifications (clubs & ribbon)
  - 10:00 – 11:00 Set F - Senior Individuals qualifications (clubs & ribbon)
  - 11:15 – 12:15 Set G - Senior Individuals qualifications (clubs & ribbon)
  - 12:15 – 13:15 Set H - Senior Individuals qualifications (clubs & ribbon)
  - 14:30 – 15:30 Set A - Senior Individuals qualifications (clubs & ribbon)
  - 15:30 – 16:30 Set B - Senior Individuals qualifications (clubs & ribbon)
  - 16:45 – 17:45 Set C - Senior Individuals qualifications (clubs & ribbon)
  - 17:45 – 18:45 Set D - Senior Individuals qualifications (clubs & ribbon)
- Saturday, May 30
  - 10:00 – 12:15 All-Around Final – Senior Individuals (Hoop, Ball) – All Finalists
  - 12:25 – 13:45 All-Around Final – Senior Individuals (Clubs, Ribbon) – Top 10 after 2nd rotation
  - 13:45 – 14:05 Award Ceremony All-Around Senior Individuals
  - 15:00 – 17:00 Qualification Senior Groups (5 balls and 3 hoops & 2 pairs of clubs – Set A)
  - 17:15 – 20:15 Qualification Senior Groups (5 balls and 3 hoops & 2 pairs of clubs – Set B)
  - 20:15 – 20:30 Award Ceremony Senior Groups AA & Team ranking (Senior Individuals & Groups)
- Sunday, May 31
  - 12:00 – 13:10 Senior Individuals Hoop & Ball Finals
  - 13:20 – 14:30 Senior Individuals Clubs & Ribbon Finals
  - 14:30 – 14:55 Award Ceremony Senior Individuals Apparatus finals
  - 16:00 – 16:40 Senior Groups 5 Balls Final
  - 16:50 – 17:30 Senior Groups 3 Hoops & 2 Pairs of Clubs Final
  - 17:30 – 17:45 SmartScoring Shooting Star Award
  - 17:45 – 18:00 Award Ceremony Senior Groups Apparatus finals

== Medal winners ==
Event	Gold	Silver	Bronze
Team
Junior Team	Bulgaria; Siyana Alekova; Dea Emilova; Aleksandra Petrova	Ukraine; Varvara Chubarova; Sofiia Krainska; Sofiia Kulikova	Israel; Mariia Miachina; Rebekka Miller; Alice Rozenberg
Senior Team	Bulgaria; Senior Individual; Eva Brezalieva; Stiliana Nikolova; Senior Group; Raya Bozhilova; Sofia Ivanova; Magdalina Minevska; Emilia Obretenova; Magdalena Valkova; Margarita Vasileva	Israel; Senior Individual; Daniela Munits; Alona Tal Franco; Senior Group; Agam Gev; Arina Gvozdetskaia; Sofia Prezhyn; Avigail Shved; Keren Sobol; Taisiia Sokolenko	Russia; Senior Individual; Maria Borisova; Sofia Ilteriakova; Eva Kononova; Senior Group; Nikol Andronchik; Arina Lysenko; Daria Melnik; Alina Proshchalykina; Nelli Reutskaia; Alena Seliverstova
Senior Individual Finals
All-Around	Darja Varfolomeev; Germany	Stiliana Nikolova; Bulgaria	Taisiia Onofriichuk; Ukraine
Hoop	Sofia Ilteriakova; Russia	Alina Harnasko; Belarus	Sofia Raffaeli; Italy
Ball	Darja Varfolomeev; Germany	Stiliana Nikolova; Bulgaria	Sofia Ilteriakova; Russia
Clubs	Stiliana Nikolova; Bulgaria	Maria Borisova; Russia	Daniela Munits; Israel
Ribbon	Darja Varfolomeev; Germany	Stiliana Nikolova; Bulgaria	Maria Borisova; Russia
Senior Group Finals
All-Around	Spain; Ines Bergua; Andrea Corral; Marina Cortelles; Andrea Fernández; Lucía Muñoz; Salma Solaun	Russia; Nikol Andronchik; Arina Lysenko; Daria Melnik; Alina Proshchalykina; Nelli Reutskaia; Alena Seliverstova	Israel; Agam Gev; Arina Gvozdetskaia; Sofia Prezhyn; Avigail Shved; Keren Sobol; Taisiia Sokolenko
5 Balls	Spain; Ines Bergua; Andrea Corral; Marina Cortelles*; Andrea Fernández; Lucía Muñoz; Salma Solaun	Belarus; Palina Aliaksandrava; Sofya Barysevich; Valeryia Malkovich; Hanna Shakun; Kiriana Shevtsova*; Taisia Yerchak	Israel; Agam Gev; Arina Gvozdetskaia; Sofia Prezhyn; Avigail Shved; Keren Sobol*; Taisiia Sokolenko
3 Hoops + 2 Pairs of Clubs	Spain; Ines Bergua; Andrea Corral; Marina Cortelles; Andrea Fernández*; Lucía Muñoz; Salma Solaun	Russia; Nikol Andronchik; Arina Lysenko; Daria Melnik*; Alina Proshchalykina; Nelli Reutskaia; Alena Seliverstova	Israel; Agam Gev; Arina Gvozdetskaia*; Sofia Prezhyn; Avigail Shved; Keren Sobol; Taisiia Sokolenko
Junior Individual Finals
Hoop	Siyana Alekova; Bulgaria	Kseniia Savinova; Russia	Flavia Cassano; Italy
Ball	Kira Babkevich; Belarus	Melissa Diete; Germany	Varvara Chubarova; Ukraine
Clubs	Nita Jamagidze; Georgia	Dea Emilova; Bulgaria	Mariia Miachina; Israel
Ribbon	Iana Zaikina; Russia	Sofiia Krainska; Ukraine	Melissa Diete; Germany

* reserve gymnast

== Results ==
=== Seniors ===
==== Qualification ====
Individual all-around and apparatus finals: Hoop: Ball: Clubs: Ribbon:

Group apparatus finals: 5 Balls: 3 Hoops and 2 Pairs of Clubs:

==== Team ====
Rank	Nation	Total
1st place, gold medalist(s)	Bulgaria	277.600
2nd place, silver medalist(s)	Israel	274.650
3rd place, bronze medalist(s)	Russia	274.650
4	Spain	274.600
5	Germany	269.600
6	Italy	269.150
7	Belarus	268.850
8	Poland	264.600
9	Ukraine	264.000
10	Romania	258.500
11	Cyprus	256.200
12	Finland	246.950
13	France	245.400
14	Hungary	241.650
15	Azerbaijan	239.350
16	Greece	236.400
17	Turkey	236.050
18	Georgia	227.100
19	Portugal	225.950
20	Austria	223.800
21	Norway	221.600
22	Lithuania	221.300
23	United Kingdom	219.500
24	Czech Republic	219.250
25	Slovakia	216.750

Source results:

==== Individual All-Around ====
Rank	Gymnast	Nation	Hoop (rhythmic gymnastics)	Ball (rhythmic gymnastics)	Clubs (rhythmic gymnastics)	Ribbon (rhythmic gymnastics)	Total
1st place, gold medalist(s)	Darja Varfolomeev	Germany	30.150 (2)	29.450 (1)	31.000 (1)	29.550 (1)	120.150
2nd place, silver medalist(s)	Stiliana Nikolova	Bulgaria	30.550 (1)	29.100 (2)	30.050 (2)	29.050 (4)	118.750
3rd place, bronze medalist(s)	Taisiia Onofriichuk	Ukraine	29.550 (4)	28.550 (4)	29.850 (3)	29.200 (2)	117.150
4	Alina Harnasko	Belarus	29.750 (3)	28.000 (6)	29.550 (5)	29.100 (3)	116.400
5	Sofia Ilteriakova	Russia	27.400	29.050 (3)	29.700 (4)	28.900 (5)	115.050
6	Maria Borisova	Russia	28.850 (6)	27.900 (7)	28.850 (6)	28.850 (6)	114.450
7	Tara Dragas	Italy	28.550 (9)	28.200 (5)	28.700 (7)	28.300 (8)	113.750
8	Sofia Raffaeli	Italy	28.850 (6)	27.000 (10)	28.500 (8)	28.800 (7)	113.150
9	Vera Tugolukova	Cyprus	29.050 (5)	27.600 (8)	28.200 (9)	27.550 (9)	112.400
10	Daniela Munits	Israel	28.100	27.300 (9)	27.850 (10)	23.700 (10)	106.950
11	Liliana Lewińska	Poland	28.150	26.550	—N/a		54.700
12	Alona Tal Franco	Israel	28.550 (9)	25.950	—N/a		54.500
13	Alba Bautista	Spain	28.600 (8)	25.650	—N/a		54.250
14	Andreea Verdeș	Romania	28.050	26.050	—N/a		54.100
15	Emilia Heichel	Poland	28.000	25.850	—N/a		53.850
16	Darya Viarenich	Belarus	27.700	25.000	—N/a		52.700
17	Daniela Picó	Spain	27.850	24.650	—N/a		52.500
18	Amalia Lică	Romania	26.900	25.400	—N/a		52.300
19	Eva Brezalieva	Bulgaria	24.300	26.900	—N/a		51.200
20	Polina Karika	Ukraine	26.700	23.650	—N/a		50.350

Source results:

==== Hoop ====
Rank	Gymnast	Nation	D Score	E Score	A Score	Pen.	Total
1st place, gold medalist(s)	Sofia Ilteriakova	Russia	13.900	8.100	7.900		29.900
2nd place, silver medalist(s)	Alina Harnasko	Belarus	13.500	8.100	8.200		29.800
3rd place, bronze medalist(s)	Sofia Raffaeli	Italy	13.500	8.000	8.050	-0.05	29.500
4	Darja Varfolomeev	Germany	13.100	8.200	8.000		29.300
5	Daniela Munits	Israel	13.300	8.000	7.900	-0.05	29.150
6	Alba Bautista	Spain	12.600	7.700	7.950		28.250
7	Eva Brezalieva	Bulgaria	12.000	7.450	7.450	-0.35	26.550
8	Stiliana Nikolova	Bulgaria	12.800	6.750	6.950		26.500

Source results:

==== Ball ====
Rank	Gymnast	Nation	D Score	E Score	A Score	Pen.	Total
1st place, gold medalist(s)	Darja Varfolomeev	Germany	13.300	8.050	8.200		29.550
2nd place, silver medalist(s)	Stiliana Nikolova	Bulgaria	13.400	8.050	8.100		29.550
3rd place, bronze medalist(s)	Sofiia Ilteriakova	Russia	12.800	8.200	7.850		28.850
4	Tara Dragas	Italy	12.700	7.650	7.950	-0.05	28.250
5	Daniela Munits	Israel	12.500	7.550	7.500		27.550
6	Taisiia Onofriichuk	Ukraine	12.200	7.200	7.650		27.050
7	Alina Harnasko	Belarus	10.600	6.850	7.350	-0.30	24.500
8	Eva Brezalieva	Bulgaria	8.800	6.400	6.650	-0.60	21.250

Source results:

==== Clubs ====
Rank	Gymnast	Nation	D Score	E Score	A Score	Pen.	Total
1st place, gold medalist(s)	Stiliana Nikolova	Bulgaria	13.400	8.200	8.200	-0.05	29.750
2nd place, silver medalist(s)	Maria Borisova	Russia	13.100	8.200	7.900		29.200
3rd place, bronze medalist(s)	Daniela Munits	Israel	13.300	7.900	8.000		29.200
4	Alona Tal Franco	Israel	13.100	7.350	7.700		28.150
5	Amalia Lică	Romania	12.000	7.700	7.800		27.500
6	Liliana Lewińska	Poland	12.200	7.300	7.850	-0.05	27.300
7	Alba Bautista	Spain	12.000	7.250	7.950	-0.05	27.150
8	Sofia Raffaeli	Italy	11.100	7.600	8.000	-0.05	26.650

Source results:

==== Ribbon ====
Rank	Gymnast	Nation	D Score	E Score	A Score	Pen.	Total
1st place, gold medalist(s)	Darja Varfolomeev	Germany	13.700	8.100	8.200		30.000
2nd place, silver medalist(s)	Stiliana Nikolova	Bulgaria	13.100	7.950	7.700		28.750
3rd place, bronze medalist(s)	Maria Borisova	Russia	12.500	7.900	8.050	-0.05	28.400
4	Sofiia Ilteriakova	Russia	12.700	7.850	7.850		28.400
5	Daniela Munits	Israel	12.400	7.800	8.150		28.350
6	Eva Brezalieva	Bulgaria	11.500	7.700	7.800		27.000
7	Sofia Raffaeli	Italy	11.900	7.300	7.650	-0.05	26.800
8	Viktoria Steinfeld	Germany	11.500	7.150	7.600		26.250

Source results:

==== Groups All-Around ====
Rank	Nation	5	3 + 2	Total
1st place, gold medalist(s)	Spain	28.850	28.800	57.650
2nd place, silver medalist(s)	Russia	26.950	26.500	53.450
3rd place, bronze medalist(s)	Israel	26.700	26.650	53.350
4	Belarus	27.450	23.100	50.550
5	Germany	24.200	26.150	50.350
6	Bulgaria	26.650	23.100	49.750
7	Ukraine	23.400	26.200	49.600
8	France	25.400	22.850	48.250
9	Hungary	25.550	22.700	48.250
10	Poland	25.200	22.750	47.950
11	Azerbaijan	24.100	22.550	46.650
12	Romania	23.250	23.000	46.250
13	Italy	20.100	24.700	44.800
14	Slovakia	24.350	20.150	44.500
15	Finland	20.000	24.000	44.000
16	Portugal	21.750	21.450	43.200
17	Cyprus	20.250	22.800	43.050
18	Greece	21.600	21.150	42.750
19	Turkey	21.350	21.250	42.600
20	Czech Republic	22.750	18.650	41.400
21	Great Britain	19.900	21.250	41.150
22	Lithuania	20.400	18.900	39.300
23	Austria	20.400	18.550	38.950
24	Norway	17.700	20.550	38.250
25	Georgia	18.250	18.750	37.000
26	Slovenia	17.600	19.150	36.750

Source results:

==== 5 Balls ====
Rank	Nation	D Score	E Score	A Score	Pen.	Total
1st place, gold medalist(s)	Spain	14.000	7.150	8.000		29.150
2nd place, silver medalist(s)	Belarus	13.100	6.900	7.550		27.550
3rd place, bronze medalist(s)	Israel	13.100	6.750	7.750	-0.05	27.550
4	Hungary	12.800	6.450	7.400		26.650
5	Poland	12.600	6.250	7.450	-0.05	26.250
6	France	12.600	6.000	7.150		25.750
7	Russia	11.800	5.950	7.350	-0.05	25.050
8	Bulgaria	8.800	4.450	6.200	-0.60	18.850

Source results:

==== 3 Hoops + 2 Pairs of Clubs ====
Rank	Nation	D Score	E Score	A Score	Pen.	Total
1st place, gold medalist(s)	Spain	13.600	6.550	7.950		28.100
2nd place, silver medalist(s)	Russia	13.200	6.250	7.550		27.000
3rd place, bronze medalist(s)	Israel	12.700	6.000	7.600		26.300
4	Ukraine	12.800	5.600	7.350		25.750
5	Italy	12.700	5.450	6.850	-0.05	24.950
6	Germany	11.300	5.050	7.200		23.550
7	Finland	10.800	5.400	6.900		23.100
8	Belarus	11.500	4.600	6.400	-0.30	22.200

Source results:

=== Junior ===
==== Qualification ====
Hoop: Ball: Clubs: Ribbon:

==== Team ====
Rank	Nation	Total
1st place, gold medalist(s)	Bulgaria	102.250
2nd place, silver medalist(s)	Ukraine	100.550
3rd place, bronze medalist(s)	Israel	97.950
4	Georgia	97.900
5	Russia	96.950
6	Belarus	96.550
7	Germany	96.250
8	Italy	95.650
9	Spain	94.050
10	France	93.200
11	Romania	91.600
12	Greece	90.800
13	Estonia	90.750
14	Finland	90.500
15	Hungary	89.800
16	Lithuania	89.300
17	Latvia	89.100
18	Turkey	88.900
19	Switzerland	87.900
20	Czech Republic	87.850
21	United Kingdom	86.900
22	Portugal	86.150
23	Cyprus	86.050
24	Azerbaijan	85.400
25	Luxembourg	84.950
26	San Marino	84.550
27	Serbia	84.500
28	Armenia	84.450
29	Moldova	84.450
30	Slovenia	83.200
31	Belgium	83.050
32	Slovakia	82.750
33	Croatia	81.800
34	Austria	79.150
35	Andorra	75.500
36	Norway	73.700
37	Montenegro	73.500
38	Malta	65.150

Source results:

==== Hoop ====
Rank	Gymnast	Nation	D Score	E Score	A Score	Pen.	Total
1st place, gold medalist(s)	Siyana Alekova	Bulgaria	11.200	7.950	7.950		27.100
2nd place, silver medalist(s)	Kseniia Savinova	Russia	10.900	7.800	7.700	-0.05	26.350
3rd place, bronze medalist(s)	Flavia Cassano	Italy	10.600	7.700	7.500		25.800
4	Alessia Koch	Germany	10.700	7.750	7.250		25.700
5	Rebekka Miller	Israel	10.300	7.500	7.650		25.450
6	Laura Lewińska	Poland	10.300	7.500	7.500	-0.05	25.250
7	Mónica de Juana	Spain	9.400	7.400	7.550		24.350
8	Sofiia Kulikova	Ukraine	9.800	6.700	7.050	-0.30	23.250

Source results:

==== Ball ====
Rank	Gymnast	Nation	D Score	E Score	A Score	Pen.	Total
1st place, gold medalist(s)	Kira Babkevich	Belarus	10.200	8.000	7.700		25.900
2nd place, silver medalist(s)	Melissa Diete	Germany	10.300	7.750	7.750		25.800
3rd place, bronze medalist(s)	Varvara Chubarova	Ukraine	10.100	7.800	7.800		25.700
4	Eva Chevtaeva	Russia	9.900	8.000	7.750		25.650
5	Nita Jamagidze	Georgia	9.700	7.800	8.000		25.500
6	Patricia Stanciu	Romania	9.500	7.300	7.550		24.350
7	Laura Lewińska	Poland	9.100	7.550	7.550		24.200
8	Algara Kochankova	France	8.300	6.350	7.500	-0.05	21.200

Source results:

==== Clubs ====
Rank	Gymnast	Nation	D Score	E Score	A Score	Pen.	Total
1st place, gold medalist(s)	Nita Jamagidze	Georgia	10.900	8.100	7.900		26.900
2nd place, silver medalist(s)	Dea Emilova	Bulgaria	10.900	8.000	7.900		26.800
3rd place, bronze medalist(s)	Mariia Miachina	Israel	10.800	8.050	7.700		26.550
4	Kira Babkevich	Belarus	10.800	8.000	7.600		26.400
5	Sofiia Krainska	Ukraine	10.200	7.850	7.700		25.750
6	Laura Lewińska	Poland	9.800	7.650	7.800		25.250
7	Ludovica Ajello	Italy	9.900	7.750	7.550		25.200
8	Claudia Mariño	Spain	9.500	7.700	7.400		24.600

Source results:

==== Ribbon ====
Rank	Gymnast	Nation	D Score	E Score	A Score	Pen.	Total
1st place, gold medalist(s)	Iana Zaikina	Russia	10.100	8.000	7.950	-0.05	26.000
2nd place, silver medalist(s)	Sofiia Krainska	Ukraine	10.700	7.600	7.450		25.750
3rd place, bronze medalist(s)	Melissa Diete	Germany	10.400	7.500	7.400		25.300
4	Naira Martínez	Spain	9.100	7.500	7.700		24.300
5	Elisabeta Corduneanu	Romania	9.000	7.250	7.450		23.700
6	Abigelė Pucetaitė	Lithuania	8.900	7.150	7.250		23.300
7	Dea Emilova	Bulgaria	8.800	6.900	6.950		22.650
8	Laura Lewińska	Poland	7.900	6.500	7.000	-0.60	20.800

Source results:

== Medal table ==
* Host nation (Bulgaria)

Rank	Nation	Gold	Silver	Bronze	Total
1	Bulgaria*	4	4	0	8
2	Germany	3	1	1	5
3	Spain	3	0	0	3
4	Russia	2	4	3	9
5	Belarus	1	2	0	3
6	Georgia	1	0	0	1
7	Ukraine	0	2	2	4
8	Israel	0	1	6	7
9	Italy	0	0	2	2
Totals (9 entries)		14	14	14	42
