= Mariia Miachina =

Israeli rhythmic gymnast (born 2011)

- Alternative name: Maria Myachina
- Nickname: Masha
- Born: 20 November 2011 (age 14) Russia

Gymnastics career
- Discipline: Rhythmic gymnastics
- Country represented: Israel; (2025-)
- Club: RG Holon
- Head coach: Jenya Morgovsky
- Assistant coach: Bar Shapochnikov
Medal record
Representing Israel
Rhythmic gymnastics
Junior European Championships
Bronze medal – third place	2026 Varna	Team
Bronze medal – third place	2026 Varna	Clubs

Mariia Miachina (alt. sp: Maria Myachina; Russian: Мария Мячина; Hebrew: מריה מיאצ'ין; born 20 November 2011) is a Russian-born rhythmic gymnast competing for Israel. She represents Israel in international competitions. On national level, she is the 2026 Israeli junior all-around silver medalist and the 2025 Israeli junior all-around bronze medalist.

== Career ==
=== Junior ===
In 2025, Mariia made her international debut at Miss Valentine International tournament in Estonia. She took 6th place in ribbon final and 5th place in team competition. She won bronze medal in all-around at Israeli Junior National Championships. In September, she competed at Czech Junior Cup and took 6th place in all-around. She won silver medal in clubs final.

In 2026, she won silver medal in clubs final at Gdynia Rhythmic Stars in Poland. She was selected to represent Israel alongside Alice Rozenberg and Rebekka Miller at 2026 European Championships in Varna, Bulgaria. They won bronze medal in team competition. Mariia also won bronze medal in clubs final. In September, she competed at Czech Junior Cup and won bronze medal in all-around. She won another bronze in ball final and silver medals in hoop, clubs and ribbon finals. Later in the year, she competed at the Aeon Cup in Tokyo, with her teammates Lian Rona and Sofiya Gandlin. In the junior all-around, Miachina won bronze behind Yana Zaikina and Anna Filipp.

== Competitive highlights ==
Year	Event	Team	AA	Hoop	Ball	Clubs	Ribb.
International
2026	Aeon Cup	5th	3rd J				
