= Sofiia Krainska =

Ukrainian rhythmic gymnast

- Софія Країнська
- Full name: Sofiia Mykhailivna Krainska
- Born: 4 April 2011 (age 15) Kyiv, Ukraine

Gymnastics career
- Discipline: Rhythmic gymnastics
- Country represented: Ukraine
- Training location: Kyiv
- Club: Deriugins School
- Head coach: Irina Deriugina
- Assistant coach: Viktoria Mazur
- Choreographer: Iryna Blokhina
- Awards: Candidate for Master of Sports of Ukraine
Medal record
Rhythmic gymnastics
Representing Ukraine
Junior European Championships
Silver medal – second place	2026 Varna	Team
Silver medal – second place	2026 Varna	Ribbon
European Cup
Bronze medal – third place	2026 Baku	Junior Clubs

Sofiia Krainska (Ukrainian: Софія Михайлівна Країнська; born 4 April 2011) is a Ukrainian rhythmic gymnast. She represents Ukraine in international competitions. She is a two-time silver medalist at the 2026 Rhythmic Gymnastics European Championships in the junior category, having won silver medals in the team competition and the ribbon final.

== Career ==
Before joining the national team of Ukraine, Sofiia trained at the Deriugins School under Viktoria Bessonova, the mother and coach of Olympic medalist Anna Bessonova.

In 2022, while temporarily staying in Italy, she trained at the "San Giorgio 79 Desio" club and competed in the Italian National Championship (Gold Allieve). She finished fourth nationally in the all-around event among gymnasts born in 2011 and won three silver medals in the rope, clubs, and ribbon routines.

In early 2023, she moved back to Ukraine to train with the Ukrainian national team. In October, at the Ukrainian Team Championships for seniors and juniors, the team comprising Sofiia Krainska, Valeriia Stepenko, Yelyzaveta Krutova, Olha Lysenko, Yelyzaveta Zabotska, and Yaroslava Fenicheva placed first in the group all-around event for gymnasts born in 2011.

In early 2024, at the Miss Valentine tournament in Tartu (Estonia), she won three gold medals in the category for gymnasts born in 2011: in the all-around, ball, and clubs routines. Later in November, she won gold in the all-around event at the Ukrainian Cup for gymnasts born in 2011. She also won bronze in the group all-around competition as part of a team alongside Valeriia Stepenko, Yelyzaveta Krutova, Kseniia Vasylchenko, and Yelyzaveta Zabotska.

=== Junior ===
==== 2025 ====
In 2025, she moved up to the junior category. At the Miss Valentine tournament, she competed among gymnasts born in 2011, winning gold medals in the all-around, ball, and clubs events. In May, she competed at the European Cup in Baku (Azerbaijan). As part of the Ukrainian national team, alongside Viktoriia Dorofieieva, Anna Vykhodets, and Liubov Gorashchenko, she placed fourth in the team event and fifth in the hoop final. In the same month, at the Ukrainian Rhythmic Gymnastics Championships in Uzhhorod in the junior category, she won a silver medal in the ball routine, a gold medal in the clubs routine together with Varvara Chubarova, and a gold medal in the team event. In September, she won bronze medals in the all-around and the ball event at the Czech Junior Cup 2025 international tournament in Brno (Czech Republic).

==== 2026 ====
In 2026, she started the season at Miss Valentine international tournament, competing in four events and placing fifth in the clubs final. In April, she won the bronze medal in the clubs final at the Sofia Cup international tournament in Sofia (Bulgaria). The following month, she competed at the European Cup in Baku (Azerbaijan), where she recorded the 12th-highest score in the ball routine and won the bronze medal in the clubs routine. Alongside Sofiia Kulikova and Varvara Chubarova, as part of the Ukrainian national team, she placed fourth in the team event.

In May, she competed at the European Championships in Varna (Bulgaria), where, in the junior category, alongside Varvara Chubarova and Sofiia Kulikova, she won the silver medal in the team event as part of the Ukrainian national team. She also won silver in the ribbon final and placed fifth in the clubs final. In September, she competed at the Czech Junior Cup in Brno, Czech Republic, where she won the gold medal in the all-around. In the apparatus finals, she also won gold medals in the clubs and ribbon events. In October, she competed at the Aeon Cup in Tokyo, with her teammates Taisiia Onofriichuk and Polina Karika. They represented Deriugina School, which won the bronze medal behind Sky Grace and Burlo and Pacific Stars.

== Protest at the 2026 European Championships ==
During the junior apparatus finals at the 2026 European Championships in Varna (Bulgaria), Sofiia Krainska and her national teammate Varvara Chubarova staged a silent protest against the return of Russian and Belarusian athletes to international gymnastics competitions. During the medal ceremony on the podium, the Ukrainian gymnasts deliberately put on headphones and closed their eyes while the anthems were played: Krainska reacted in this way to the Russian national anthem, while Chubarova did so during the Belarusian anthem. The protest generated significant public attention and received widespread coverage in Ukrainian and international sports media, as well as prompting the launch of a global campaign using the hashtags #CloseYourEyesAndEars and #RememberUkraine.

== Routine music information ==
Year	Apparatus	Music title
2026	Hoop	Good News by Apashe
2026	Ball	The Pink Panther Theme by Henry Mancini
2026	Clubs	A Spoonful of Sugar (From Mary Poppins) by Julie Andrews
2026	Ribbon	(Let Me Be Your) Teddy Bear by Elvis Presley
