= Melissa Diete =

German rhythmic gymnast

- Born: 26 August 2012 (age 14) Nauheim, Germany

Gymnastics career
- Discipline: Rhythmic gymnastics
- Country represented: Germany; (2026-present)
- Club: TSG Neu-Isenburg
- Gym: Bundesstützpunkt Schmiden
- Head coach: Yulia Raskina
- Former coach: Irina Martens
Medal record
Representing Germany
Junior European Championships
Silver medal – second place	2026 Varna	Ball
Bronze medal – third place	2026 Varna	Ribbon

Melissa Diete (born 26 August 2012) is a German rhythmic gymnast. She's a multiple European Championships medalist.

== Career ==
In May 2022 Diete became the national champion among gymnasts born in 2012. The following year she won gold at the Hessian Championships, earning a spot for the German Junior Championships, where she also won the gold medal.

She repeated the result in 2024, becoming the German champion among 12 years olds. In November she helped Eintracht Frankfurt win their second bronze in the Bundesliga.

In 2025 she again topped the Hessian rankings, qualifying for national championships. She then competed for TSV Schmiden in the Bundesliga, winning gold in the December.

=== Junior ===
Diete became a junior in 2026, debuting at the Miss Valentine tournament in Tartu where she won silver in both the clubs and ribbon finals. The following month she won silver with hoop and gold with clubs at the Gymnastik International. In May she took part in the Gdynia Stars where she didn't made the finals. Later she won all five gold medals at the German Junior Championships among 2012 born juniors. She was then selected for the European Championships in Varna, taking 7th place in teams, along Olivia Misterek and Alessia Koch, and won silver with ball and bronze with ribbon.

In August, Diete moved from Frankfurt to train in the federal base in Fellbach with Yulia Raskina.

== Routine music information ==
Year	Apparatus	Music title
2027	Hoop	Sonne by Rammstein
2027	Ball	Pandemonium by Worakls
2027	Clubs	A Night On Bald Mountain (Remastered 1999) by Eduardo Mata & Dallas Symphony Orchestra
2027	Ribbon	
2026	Hoop	Sonne by Rammstein
2026	Ball	Private Investigations by Dire Straits
2026	Clubs	
2026	Ribbon	Spice Up Your Life (Morales Radio Mix) by Spice Girls
