= Lucía González (gymnast, born 2006) =

Spanish rhythmic gymnast

- Born: February 12, 2006 (age 20) Villajoyosa, Spain

Gymnastics career
- Discipline: Rhythmic gymnastics
- Country represented: Spain (2019-present)
- Club: Club Benidorm
- Head coach: Lilia Nikolova
Medal record
Rhythmic Gymnastics
Representing Spain
Event	1st	2nd	3rd
FIG World Cup	0	1	1
Total	0	1	1

Lucía González (born 12 February 2006) is a Spanish rhythmic gymnast. She represents Spain in international competitions. On national level, she is a two-time (2025, 2026) Spanish national all-around bronze medalist.

== Career ==
=== Junior ===
In 2019 González was selected for the 1st junior World Championship in Moscow, where she was 7th in teams and 36th with clubs, her only apparatus. That year she also won bronze with rope and clubs at the Spanish Championships. In September she was confirmed in the national team for two more years, and then competed at the Mediterranean Games in Cagliari, Italy where she was 2nd with the team along Salma Solaun, Teresa Gorospe and Irene Martínez, winning gold with clubs.

In December 2020, after the season stalled due to COVID-19 outbreak, she was crowned national champion among juniors. In 2021 she was confirmed in the national team.

=== Senior ===
González became a senior in 2022, debuting at the World Cup in Sofia, being 28th in the all-around, 30th with hoop, 31st with ball, 31st with clubs and 17th with ribbon.

In January 2023, Lucía was selected for the national team's training camp in Gran Canaria along Patricia Pérez, Irene Martínez, Valeria Márquez, Inés Bergua, Mireia Martínez, Andrea Fernández, Nerea Moreno, Salma Solaun, Ana Arnau and individuals Polina Berezina, Teresa Gorospe and Alba Bautista. She then competed at World Challenge Cup in Portimão, taking 15th place overall, 16th with hoop, 17th with ball, 4th with clubs and 19th with ribbon.

In 2025, she started her season at the World Cup in Sofia, finishing 20th in the All-Around, 18th with hoop, 7th with ball, 27th with clubs and 42nd with ribbon. A week later won gold in all-Around at a tournament in Ourense. In May, she took part in the World Challenge Cup in Portimão where she won her first medals in that competition, bronze with clubs and silver with ribbon. In June, Lucia represented Spain together with Daniela Pico at the 2025 European Championships in Tallinn, Estonia. She placed 12th in all-around final. In July, she won bronze medal in all-around at Spanish National Championships behind Daniela Picó. On July 25-27, she competed at the Cluj-Napoca World Challenge Cup and finished 17th in the all-around. She took 5th place in hoop and 7th in clubs final. In August, she was selected to represent Spain alongside Alba Bautista at the 2025 World Championships in Rio de Janeiro, Brazil. She took 24th place in all-around qualifications and 8th place in team competition together with senior group.

In 2026, she competed at Grand Prix Thiais and took 5th place with clubs and 9th place with hoop. She competed at World Cup Baku and took 18th place in all-around. In June, she won bronze medal in all-around at the 2026 Spanish national championships behind Alba Bautista and Daniela Picó.

== Routine music information ==
Year	Apparatus	Music title
2026	Hoop	Hartita de Llorar by Lachispa
2026	Ball	NADIE SABE by Bad Bunny
2026	Clubs	Doble Corazón by Monica Naranjo
2026	Ribbon	Arrasando by Thalia
2025	Hoop	We Found Love (Album Version) by Calvin Harris feat Rihanna
2025	Ball	Lucia / Yo Tengo una Cosa by Niña Pastori
2025	Clubs	Jako by LADANIVA
2025	Ribbon	Péiname Juana by DENNA, SALMA
2024	Hoop	We Found Love (Album Version) by Calvin Harris feat Rihanna
2024	Ball	Lucia by ?
2024	Clubs	Space Jam by Quad City DJ's / Pump Up The Jam by Technotronic
2024	Ribbon	Poem Without Words 2 - Journey By Night by Anne Clark
2023	Hoop	Can You Hold Me by NF
2023	Ball	Disfruto by Carla Morrison
2023	Clubs	Space Jam by Quad City DJ's / Pump Up The Jam by Technotronic
2023	Ribbon	Poem Without Words 2 - Journey By Night by Anne Clark
2022	Hoop	Manners Maketh Man by Henry Jackman, Matthew Margeson, Dominic Lewis
2022	Ball	Disfruto by Carla Morrison
2022	Clubs	Ma Fi Nom by Najwa Karam
2022	Ribbon	Sympathique by Pink Martini
2021	Hoop	Al-Andaluz (Balada Española) by Manolo Carrasco
2021	Ball	XY by VITAA & SLIMANE
2021	Clubs	El Cumbanchero (Instrumental) by Rey Casas
2021	Ribbon	Padam Padam
2020	Rope	Zapateado: Op. 23 (Arr. for harmonica and piano) by Antonio Serrano
2020	Ball	I Put a Spell On You by Screamin' Jay Hawkins
2020	Clubs	Whatever You Want by Status Quo
2020	Ribbon	Desengaño y Pasión (Solea por Bulerias) by Tino de Geraldo, Carles Benabent, Jorge Pardo & Manolo Carrasco
2019	Rope	Zapateado: Op. 23 (Arr. for harmonica and piano) by Antonio Serrano
2019	Ball	Vencer al Amor by India Martínez
2019	Clubs	Jai Ho (You Are My Destiny) by A.R. Rahman, The Pussycat Dolls
2019	Ribbon	Spartacus (1968 Bolshoi Version) [Arr. Y. Grigorovich]: Introduction by Deutsches Symphonie-Orchester Berlin, Michail Jurowski & RIAS Chamber Chorus
