= Juan Antonio Simarro =

Spanish composer, interpreter and producer

- Born: Juan Antonio Simarro González; December 17, 1973 (age 52); Santa Cruz de Tenerife, Spain
- Genres: Classical, jazz, pop
- Years active: 1993–present
- Website: www.juanantoniosimarro.com

Juan Antonio Simarro González (born December 17, 1973), stage name Juan Antonio Simarro, is a Spanish composer, interpreter and producer.

His skills stand out in modern classical music composition, for which he is known in Europe. He has a broad career as an arranger and a producer for popular singers, and as a composer for drama, television and cinema.

== Musical education and beginnings ==
Born in Santa Cruz de Tenerife, Canary Islands, Simarro moved to Madrid, his current home, when he was 4. He started his musical education at 13, covering musical theory, chorale, music history, violoncello, Piano, harmony, contemporary harmony, improvisation, jazz and orchestra conducting.

He received his bachelor's degree in Musical Education from the Complutense University of Madrid. He participated in recording and tours with various artists. Since 2006 Simarro has focused on music composition.

== Arranger and producer ==
Simarro has been contracted as a live musician, arranger or producer for Nena Daconte, Manu Tenorio, Julio Iglesias, Dúo Dinámico, Bertín Osborne and José Vélez and similar artists.

Looking for his own paths in order to find and develop creativity, he partnered as an executive producer for Marditos Roedores Producciones Multimedia. In 2008, he funded his own musical production company, Analógica Producciones S.L., from which he launched his first classic music album, starting his solo career.

== Works for TV, cinema and drama ==
Simarro has composed a variety of musical pieces for Spanish television: Popstars, Big Brother, El programa de Ana Rosa, Dónde estás corazón, Ahora caigo, Noche de fiesta, Sabor a ti, and the spots series about the 50 years of TVE.

His film composition credits include New Dominican Yorker (Daniel Melguiz), The land of the Lapping Death and Obsesión 42.195 (Roberto Carrasco). In 2013 he composed and directed the B.S.O. of the movie Black diamonds (written and directed by Miguel Alcantud).

He is also the music composer of the Spanish short movies La Salchicha or El niño de Alambre, and various drama projects.

== Career as a classical music composer ==
He is frequently the interpreter of his own workpieces, performing solo on piano, violoncello, violin, and ukulele.

After composing some pieces and covers for different TV programs, in 2006, altogether with Javier Gúrpide, he releases his ballets El Equilibrista and La Malaventura (edited by RTVE Música recording company).

On October 1, 2013, commemorating the International Day of the Music, he releases in Minsk (Belarus) his orchestral works Cádiz, Symphonic Poem, Adagio for violin, piano and string orchestra, String Quartet no. 1, piano duos and solos.

A great variety of orchestras could enjoy Simarro's talent: City of Praga Symphony Orchestra, RTVE Symphony Orchestra, Lviv Symphony Orchestra (Ukraine), Belarusian Radio and TV Symphony Orchestra, Neotonarte Cord Orchestra, The Moscow State Radio Television Symphony Orchestra, Anzoátegui Metropolitan Philharmonic Orchestra, Nueva Espartala State (Venezuela) Symphonic Orchestra, The National Ensemble, etc. Some other artists collaborated in his masterpieces, like Iñaki Etxepare and Edith Saldaña (violoncello), Ara Malikian, Jacqueline Wdderburn-Maxwell, Nazary Pylatyuk (violin), Antonio Palmer, Igor Pylatyuk, Borja Quintas and Gerardo Estrada (orchestra conducting).

He picked National Auditorium of Madrid to release most of his works, while others have been premiered or performed in auditoriums like Teatro Monumental and Sala Manuel de Falla in Madrid, Teatro Euskalduna in Bilbao, Meridian Center in Moscow, Radio Television Auditorium in Belarus, Palau de la Musica in Barcelona and Auditorium of Palma de Mallorca.

== Touching other styles ==
Bipolar, more or less (2012), defined as pop but born of an undetermined musical style, is a compositional collaboration of renowned professional musical artists. It was conceived to explore different sensibilities in the pop music field.

The single Night at the Café Montarto (2013), is a jazz piece that emerged from a piano improvisation.

He studied and developed for the movie Black Diamonds (2013), a soundtrack heavily influenced by African tribal rhythms.

== Current activity ==
Simarro is the Artistic Director for the non-profit Spanish foundation Voces para la conciencia y el Desarrollo. The organization's aim is support of the sustainable development of people and nations, working against poverty, and providing culture inspirational and a source for social change. To support this, he carried on certain activities as philanthropic gigs and cultural workshops in developing countries.

In 2013 he premiered his first solo album, Juan Antonio Simarro, under the seal of his own music producer, Análogica Producciones S.L..

During 2013 and 2014, he toured different countries in Europe and the Americas (Madrid, Moscow, Ukraine, Belarus, US, Venezuela, etc.) There, he showed his compositions and perform some solos.

Among his notable worksare Cádiz, Symphonic Poem and Adagio for violin, piano and orchestra.

== Discography ==
=== Albums ===
- 2006: El equilibrista y La malaventura, with Javier Gúrpide (RTVE Música)
- 2013: Juan Antonio Simarro (Analógica Producciones)

=== Singles ===
- 2006: El equilibrista (ballet)
- 2006: La malaventura (ballet)
- 2012: How can I say how much I love you
- 2013: Adagio for violin, piano and string orchestra
- 2013: String quartet no. 1
- 2013: Duo No. 1 for cello and piano. Nocturne
- 2013: Duo No. 1 for violin and piano. Nocturne
- 2013: Divertimento for ukelele and string orchestra
- 2013: Night at the Café Montarto
- 2013: Dream No. 1
- 2013: Dream No. 2
- 2013: Drean No. 3

=== Multimedia works ===
- 2012: How can I say how much I love you (video)
- 2014: Cádiz, Symphonic Poem (video, publicado por Gerardo Estrada)
- 2014: Adagio for violin, piano and string orchestra (video)
- 2014: Night at the Café Montarto (video)
- 2014: Dream No. 1 (video)
- 2014: Dream No. 2 (video)
- 2014: Divertimento for ukelele and string orchestra (video)
