= Manolo Carrasco =

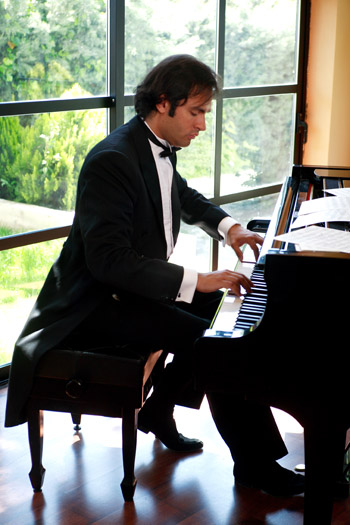
- Carrasco in his house

Background information
- Born: 15 March 1971 (age 55); Cádiz, Spain

Manolo Carrasco is a Spanish pianist and conductor. He is the author of Real Escuela Andaluza del Arte Ecuestre's music. He has recorded a few albums and is also a developer and performer on tours around Japan, China, the United States, Europe and Spain.

== Recordings ==
- Arena y Mar
- Sueños de Juventud
- Clásicos Internacionales
- Clásicos Españoles 1
- Clasicos Españoles 2
- Al-Andalus
- Gitana
- Passionata Andaluza
- Greatest Hits (Note: Royal Philharmonic Orchestra)
- Banda Sonora Original El cielo podría haber cantado
- Cómo bailan los caballos andaluces
- Grandes éxitos de Manolo Carrasco
- Andaluza de Danza (Note: Released in Asia)
- Gipsy
- Dance Andalucia
- Between two seas
