= Alba Bautista =

Spanish rhythmic gymnast

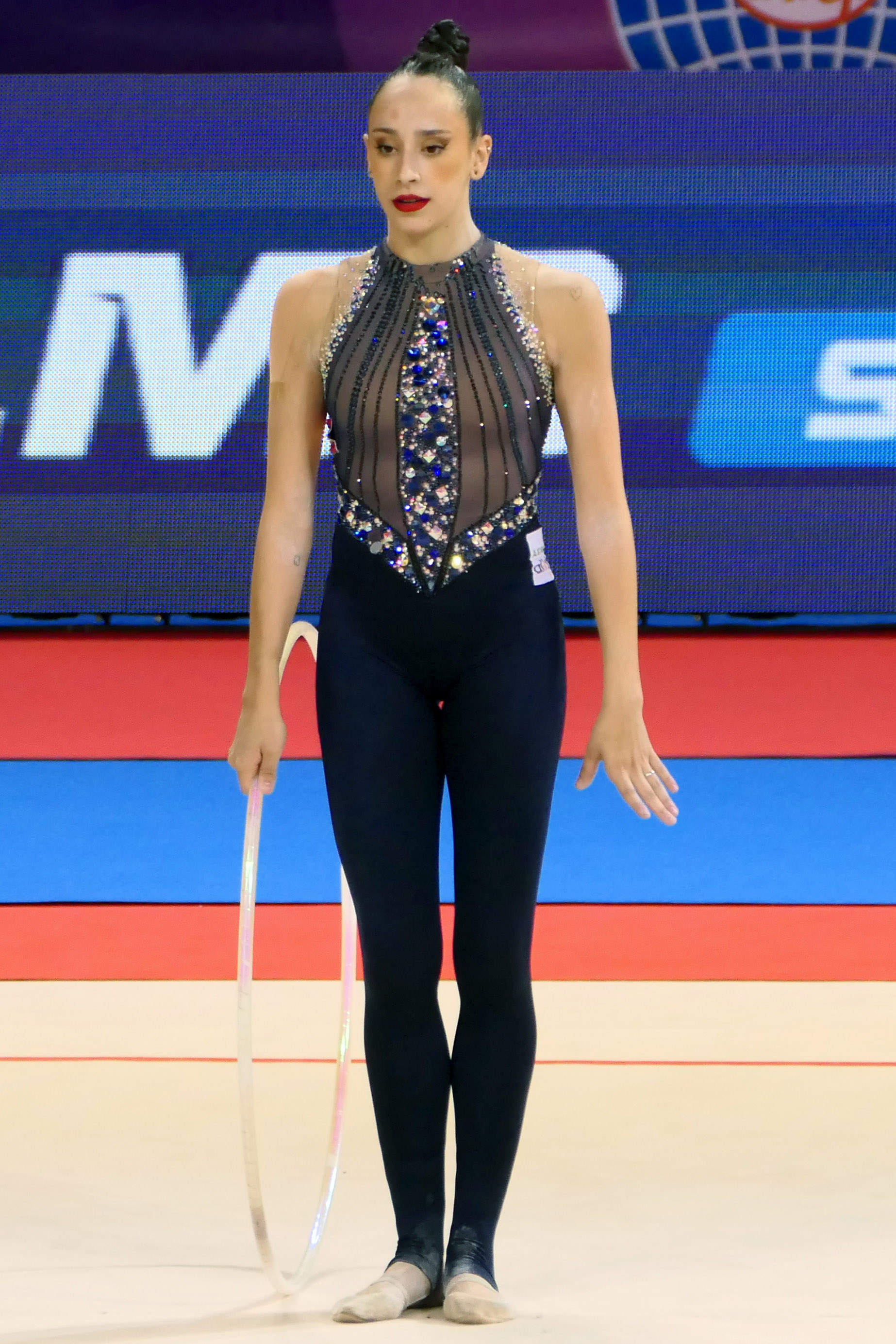
- Bautista in 2024

Personal information
- Full name: Alba Bautista Cañas
- Born: 13 July 2002 (age 24) Utrillas, Spain

Gymnastics career
- Discipline: Rhythmic gymnastics
- Country represented: Spain; (2018-)
- Club: Club Mabel Benicarlo
- Head coach: Marta Linares
Medal record
Rhythmic Gymnastics
Representing Spain
Event	1st	2nd	3rd
FIG World Cup	0	0	2
FIG World Challenge Cup	0	0	1
Total	0	0	3
World Championships
Bronze medal – third place	2022 Sofia	Team

Alba Bautista Cañas (Note: In this Spanish name, the first or paternal surname is Bautista and the second or maternal family name is Cañas.) (born 13 July 2002) is a Spanish rhythmic gymnast. She won a bronze medal at the 2022 World Championships in the team category. She competed at the 2024 Paris Olympics in the rhythmic individual all-around and finished in 20th place in the qualification round.

On national level, she is a three-time (2023–2025) Spanish national champion.

== Personal life ==
Bautista took up the sport at age six in Teruel. She was named the 2019 Female Athlete of the Year in Teruel, Spain. The award ceremony took place in 2021.

== Career ==
=== Junior ===
Bautista won the all-around bronze at the 2017 Spanish national championships, as well as silver with ball and clubs and gold with ribbon. She won another bronze with the clubs in the Spanish club championships. Because of her results, she was included in the national team.

=== Senior ===
==== 2018 ====
In 2018, Bautista was selected to take part in the Gymnasiada, finishing 16th. She later won bronze with ribbon at the Spanish national championships. Bautista was one of several gymnasts selected to competed for one of the Spanish spots at the 2018 World Championships, but she didn't make the team. In December, she was confirmed as part of the national team and integrated in the team training at the "Centro Deportivo Colonial Sport" in Valencia.

==== 2019 ====
Bautista started 2019 by competing in the Kyiv Grand Prix, followed by the Baltic Hoop tournament, where she was 19th. In May, María Añó was injured and Bautista substituted for her at the World Cup in Guadalajara, which was her debut on the World Cup circuit. At nationals, she won silver with ball. In September Bautista was again named for the national team.

==== 2020 ====
In 2020, Bautista was to participate in the Guadalajara Tournament and the Deriugina Cup, but the COVID-19 pandemic stalled the season. She returned to training in September as a temporary reserve member for the national team. Bautista also won the all-around silver behind Dina Averina at the 2nd Online Tournament, organized by the Russian Federation. In December she became the national silver medalist behind Polina Berezina.

==== 2021 ====
Bautista won bronze at the 2021 Spanish National Championships She was chosen to participate in the World Cup Challenge in Cluj-Napoca but ultimately did not compete due to a serious foot injury. She took part in the selection process for the Spanish team to compete at the 2021 World Championships, though again, she did not make the team.

==== 2022: Breakout season ====
In 2022, Bautista participated in the first World Cup of the season in Athens, finishing 16th in the all-around. Her best apparatus was the ribbon, where she placed ninth. She then took part in the international tournament in Marbella, again placing 16th. Bautista replaced Teresa Gorospe at the World Cup stage in Sofia. She also participated in the World Challenge Cup in Pamplona.

In late May, Bautistia was selected for her first major international competition, the 2022 European Championships in Tel Aviv, Israel, along with Polina Berezina, the two juniors Marina Cortelles and Victoria Correia and the senior group. Bautista qualified for the all-around final and placed 17th. Bautista later described it as a special event for her as the competition where her international career began to take off.

The following month, at nationals, she won the silver medal behind Berezina and ahead of Gorospe. Bautista then attended the last World Challenge Cup of the season in Cluj-Napoca, where she qualified for the hoop and ribbon event finals. In September she was added to the national team for 2022–2023.

Bautista competed at her first World Championships in Sofia, Bulgaria along with Berezina and the senior group. She and the other Spanish gymnasts won bronze in the team event. It was Spain's first medal in the World Championships team event since 1991. She also qualified for the all-around, ball and ribbon finals, finishing 17th, 5th and 7th respectively.

==== 2023: First national title ====
In January 2023, Bautista attended a training camp in Gran Canaria along with the rest of the national team. She won a silver medal with ribbon at the Grand Prix stage in Marbella, then competed at the 2023 World Cup in Sofia, where she finished in 8th place in the all-around and qualified for the ribbon and hoop finals.

At the Spanish Rhythmic Gymnastics Championships, she won her first national title ahead of Polina Berezina and Cristina Korniychuk. In July, she competed at the World Cup stage in Milan and qualified for the hoop final. She was 10th in the all-around standings. Ahead of the 2023 European Championships, she said she hoped to improve on her placement from the year before. However, after qualifying in 11th place, in the all-around final, she again finished in 17th place.

The 2023 World Championships were held in Spain, in Valencia and were a qualifying event for the 2024 Summer Olympics. Bautista was selected to compete along with Berezina. Both of them ranked high enough in the all-around qualification to each earn an Olympic berth for Spain. In the all-around final, Bautista came in 8th place. She said that she with the pressure to win the Olympic spot gone, she enjoyed herself competing in the final.

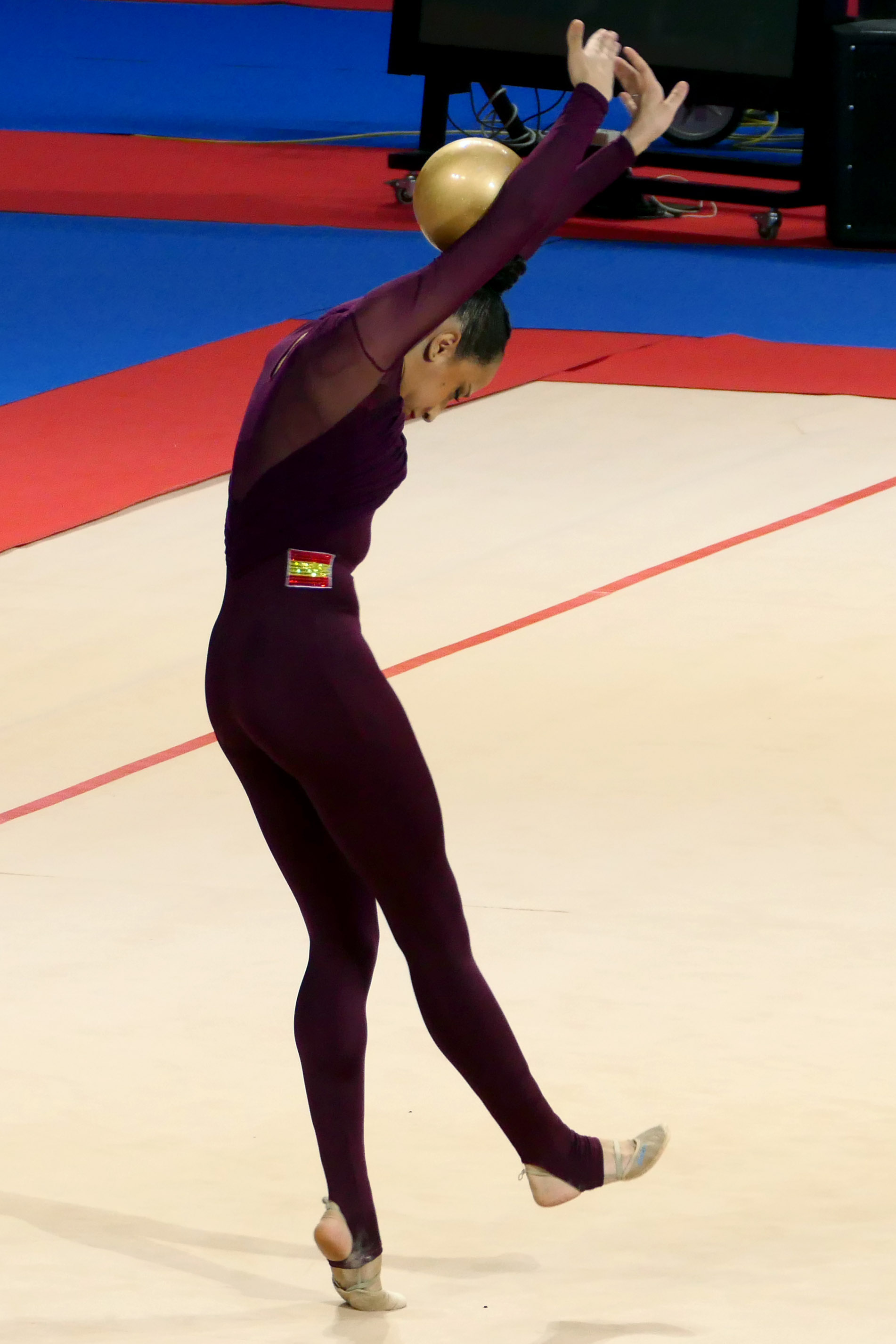
Bautista at the 2024 Sofia World Cup

==== 2024 ====
Bautista competed at the 2024 World Cup stages in Sofia, where she finished in 13th and did not make any finals, and in Baku, where she ended in 14th place in the all-around and 8th place in the clubs final. She also competed at the World Challenge Cup in Portimão and won the all-around bronze medal. She qualified to three finals and was fifth with both clubs and ribbon and sixth with hoop.

At the 2024 European Championships, Bautista placed 14th in the all-around final, just behind fellow Spanish gymnast Polina Berezina. She also qualified for three apparatus finals. She placed fourth in the hoop final, close to the bronze medal score, and 6th in the ball and 7th in the ribbon final.

Ahead of the 2024 Summer Olympics, Bautista was visited at her training center by singer C. Tangana, whose music she was using for her clubs routine. In August, Bautista competed at the 2024 Summer Olympics. In the qualification round, she made mistakes in her routines, including dropping her apparatus multiple times. She ended the qualification round in 20th place and did not advance to the final. Afterward, she said that she was both happy to have competed at the Olympics and angry about her poor performance, and that she had suffered more from nerves than she had at any other competition.

She suffered an injury to her left foot in December and took two months off training.

==== 2025 ====
Bautista began her season at the Grand Prix in Marbella. However, at the competition, she re-injured her foot taking off for a jump. She withdrew from the rest of the competition. She said she was taking six weeks to recover and hoped to be able to compete at the European Championships in June. At that competition she competed only with ball and took 13th place in qualifications. In July, she won another Spanish National all-around title in front of Daniela Picó and Lucía González. In July, she returned to international stage, competing at World Challenge Cup Cluj-Napoca. She took 39th place in all-around due to mistakes in three out of four routines. She was 10th with hoop, her best score of the event, and missed qualifying for the apparatus final by 0.05 points. In August, she was selected to represent Spain alongside Lucía González at the 2025 World Championships in Rio de Janeiro, Brazil. Together with the senior group, they took 8th place in the team competition. She ended 20th place in the all-around qualifications.

==== 2026 ====
In 2026, Bautista started the season competing at the Marbella Grand Prix in March. She took 8th place in the all-around. She was 6th in hoop and 8th in the ball final. Later in March, she took 22nd place in the all-around at the Sofia World Cup. In April, she competed at the Baku World Cup and ended in 24th place in the all-around. On 15-17 May, she competed at the Portimão World Challenge Cup and won the bronze medal in the clubs final behind Vera Tugolukova.

Later in May, she represented Spain at the 2026 European Championships in Varna, and she finished in 13th place in the all-around final. She took 4th place in the team competition alongside Daniela Pico and the senior group. She qualified to two apparatus finals; she placed 6th with hoop and 7th with clubs. In June, she won the silver medal in the all-around at the 2026 Spanish national championships behind Daniela Picó. In July, she took 27th place in the all-around at the Milan World Cup. In August, she was selected to represent Spain at the 2026 World Championships in Frankfurt, Germany, alongside Daniela Picó and the senior group. She finished in 37th place in all-around qualifications. Afterwards, she was again selected to represent Spain with Picó at the 2026 Mediterranean Games in Taranto, Italy, where she placed 7th in the all-around final.

== Routine music information ==
Year	Apparatus	Music Title
2026	Hoop	Berghain by Rosalía, Björk, Yves Tumor
2026	Ball	Eaea by Blanca Paloma
2026	Clubs	Cuídate by Valeria Castro
2026	Ribbon	Angel by Manolo Carrasco & SAINT PETERSBURG VIRTUOSO SYMPHONY ORCHESTRA
2025	Hoop	Soundtrack Esto es cine by Juan Antonio Simarro
2025	Ball	Eaea by Blanca Paloma
2025	Clubs	Cuídate by Valeria Castro
2025	Ribbon	Yama (feat. Tribal Dance & Natalie Wamba Berry) / DANÇARINA (feat. Nicky Jam, MC Pedrinho) [Remix] by Armin van Buuren & Vini Vici, PEDRO SAMPAIO, Anitta & Dadju
2024	Hoop	Soundtrack "Esto es cine" by Juan Antonio Simarro
2024	Ball	Veneno by Dellafuente
2024	Clubs	Demasiadas Mujeres / Orgullo by C. Tangana, El Barrio (singer)
2024	Ribbon	Maria Si Fueras Mia by Vivere Memento
2023	Hoop	Libertango by Aydar Gaynullin
2023	Ball	Veneno by Dellafuente
2023	Clubs	War / Becoming One Of The People-Becoming One With Neytiri by James Horner (Avatar OST)
2023	Ribbon	La Saeta by India Martínez
2022	Hoop	Battle For Kingdom Trailer by Laurent Juillet / Empieza el matriarcado and other quotes from La casa de papel
2022	Ball	Atlántida (live) by Manolo Carrasco
2022	Clubs	Continent by Adrián Berenguer
2022	Ribbon	La Saeta by India Martínez
2021	Hoop	Romeo and Juliet: Dance of the Knights (Epic Trailer Version)
2021	Ball	Encanto Rojo by Fabio Hager Sexteto
2021	Clubs	Pushin On by 2WEI, Marvin Brooks
2021	Ribbon	
2020	Hoop	Il barbiere di Siviglia: Overture by Rossini
2020	Ball	Encanto Rojo by Fabio Hager Sexteto
2020	Clubs	Carmen Fantasia by Maxim Vengerov
2020	Ribbon	Paquita: Variation 2: Moderato by Leon Minkus, Anna Takova-Baynova, Valentina Raicheva
2019	Hoop	The Trail by Marcin Przybylowicz
2019	Ball	Non, je ne regrette rien by Edith Piaf
2019	Clubs	Romance Con La Locura by Monica Naranjo
2019	Ribbon	Si Un Jour
