= Daniela Picó =

Spanish rhythmic gymnast

- Full name: Daniela Picó Fernández
- Born: July 5, 2008 (age 18) Alcoy, Alicante Spain

Gymnastics career
- Discipline: Rhythmic gymnastics
- Country represented: Spain (2022-present)
- Club: CGR Alcoi
- Gym: Centro de Alto Rendimiento de Madrid
- Head coach: Alejandra Quereda
Medal record
Rhythmic Gymnastics
Representing Spain
Mediterranean Games
Silver medal – second place	2026 Taranto	All-around

Daniela Picó Fernández (born 5 July 2008) is a Spanish rhythmic gymnast. She represents Spain in international competitions. On national level, she is the 2026 Spanish national champion.

== Biography ==
In June 2017 Picó took silver in the All-Around, bronze with rope and gold in free-hands at the Spanish Championships. Two years later she was crowned 2019 Spanish group champion, also winning silver in the event finals, in the newbie category (10-11 years old) along Blanca Agudo, Ana Silvestre, Paula Torregrosa and Paula Hinojar.

In 2020 she won silver with hoop and bronze with rope at the first stage of the Spanish clubs championship. In August she was called up for a national selection camp. In December she took gold with rope and silver with hoop at the second stage of the club championship. Days later she won silver in the All-Around at nationals in Valencia among pre juniors. She then was named the best promotional athlete at the Juan Agudo Garat Award for local athletes.

=== Junior ===
In March 2021 she won gold with rope and silver with hoop in the Liga Iberdrola final.

In May 2022 she was again called up for a national selection in Oviedo. She then won gold in teams, with rope and bronze with ribbon at the Spanish Championships for School Age Children. At the Spanish Championships she was crowned national champion in the All-Around, with clubs and with ribbon. In late July she became part of the Spanish junior national group. In December she made her debut in Zaragoza making an exibiton of the two routines.

In May 2023 she competed at the Junior European Championships in Baku, being 8th in the group all-Around and 5th with 5 balls. The following month the group won bronze with 5 ropes, behind Italy and Azerbaijan, at the Pharaohs Cup. In July she was selected for the Junior World Championships in Cluj-Napoca, Romania, along Andrea Corral, Alexandra Marcos, Celia Rodríguez, Alba Vidal and Lucía Muñoz. There she was 11th in the group all-Around, 18th with 5 balls, 7th with 5 ropes and 18th in teams. In August she was a flag bearer at the World Championships in Valencia.

=== Senior ===
In 2024, she switched to competing as individual, becoming a part of the national team. In June she was 7th overall at the Spanish Championships in Avilés.

In March 2025, she took part in the Marbella Grand Prix being 18th in the All-Around. At the first stage of the Liga Iberdrola she took 5th place overall and won gold with clubs and hoop. She then participated in the World Cup in Sofia, being 9th in the All-Around, 8th with hoop, 33rd with ball, 15th with clubs and 4th with ribbon. In early May she was 14th in the All-Around, 11th with hoop, 18th with ball, 12th with clubs and 16th with ribbon in Portimão. It was then revealed that she had been selected to compete at the European Championships in Tallinn, being 18th in the All-Around, 13th with hoop, 30th with clubs and 37th with ribbon. In June she won bronze with clubs and with ribbon at the Liga Iberdrola's final, helping Calpe taking 6th place. On July 5, she won silver medal in all-around at Spanish national championship behind Alba Bautista and in front of Lucía González.

In 2026, Daniela started the season competing at the Marbella Grand Prix in March. She took 12th place in the all-around. She was 7th in hoop and 9th in clubs final. Later in March, she took 26th place in the all-around at the Sofia World Cup. In April, she competed at the Baku World Cup and ended in 27th place in the all-around. At World Challenge Cup Portimão she took 10th place in all-around. She qualified to three apparatus finals, ending on 4th place with hoop and ribbon, and on 8th with clubs. Later in May, she represented Spain at the 2026 European Championships in Varna, and she finished in 17th place in the all-around final. She took 4th place in the team competition alongside Alba Bautista and the senior group. In June, she became the 2026 Spanish national all-around champion in front of Alba Bautista and Lucía González.

In August, she was selected to represent Spain at the 2026 World Championships in Frankfurt, Germany, alongside Alba Bautista and senior group. In her World Championships debut, she ended on 19th place in all-around qualifications and missed the all-around final by 0.45 point. Afterwards, she was selected to represent Spain alongside Alba Bautista at the 2026 Mediterranean Games in Taranto, Italy, and won silver medal in all-around behind Hatice Gokce Emir.

== Routine music information ==
Year	Apparatus	Music title
2026	Hoop	Swan Song by Power-Haus & Ros Stephen
2026	Ball	Gloria by Gloria Trevi
2026	Clubs	In The Navy / In The Navy (12" Version) by Village People
2026	Ribbon	No lo Diré by María Peláe
2025	Hoop	Revolution by Eternal Eclipse
2025	Ball	vampire by Olivia Rodrigo
2025	Clubs	In The Navy / In The Navy (12" Version) by Village People
2025	Ribbon	Für Elise Jam by The Piano Guys
