= Russian Junior Rhythmic Gymnastics Championships =

The Russian Junior Rhythmic Gymnastics Championships (Russian: Первенство России по художественной гимнастике) are organized annually by the Russian Rhythmic Gymnastics Federation.

Competitors are divided into the following two age categories: juniors (Russian: юниорки, 13–15 years old) and girls (девочки, 9–12). (As of 2020, age 13 to 15 years corresponds to birth years 2005 to 2007, and age 11 to 12 years corresponds to birth years 2008 to 2009.) Juniors perform routines corresponding to the Candidate for Master of Sports (CMS) skill level, girls performs routines corresponding to the First Class skill level.

Some events can be held simultaneously with the senior nationals. For example, in 2019 the individual events took place in January in Kazan as "Russian Junior Individual Championships" (Russian: Первенство России в индивидуальных упражнениях), while the group events were held as "Russian Junior Group Championships" (Первенство России в групповых упражнениях) in the summer in Moscow's newly built Gymnastics Palace simultaneously with the senior individual championships.

== Medalists in individual all-around ==
=== CMS ===
Year	Location	Gold	Silver	Bronze	Ref.
2003	Rostov-on-Don			Irina Gorodova	
...
2005	Belgorod				
...
2009	Dmitrov	Maria Zheludkova	Daria Svatkovskaya	Ekaterina Tarasova	
2010	St. Petersburg	Alexandra Merkulova	Ekaterina Tarasova	Anna Trubnikova	
2011	Samara	Diana Borisova	Yulia Sinitsyna	Yana Kudryavtseva	
2012	Kazan	Yulia Sinitsyna	Diana Borisova	Yana Kudryavtseva	
2013	Kazan	Yulia Bravikova	Aleksandra Soldatova	Dina Averina	
2014	Kazan	Yulia Bravikova	Veronika Polyakova	Alina Ermolova	
2015	Kazan	Alina Ermolova	Arina Altushkina	Daria Pridannikova	
2016	Kazan	Alina Ermolova	Polina Shmatko	Maria Sergeeva	
2017	Kazan	Lala Kramarenko	Marina Lobanova	Dariia Sergaeva; Anna Sokolova	
2018	Kazan	Lala Kramarenko	Dariia Sergaeva	Daria Trubnikova	
2019	Kazan	Lala Kramarenko	Dariia Sergaeva	Alexandra Skubova	
2020	Moscow	Diana Simoshina	Alexandra Skubova	Olga Karaseva	
2021	Moscow	Anna Popova	Maria Borisova	Vladislava Sharonova	
2022	Moscow	Maria Borisova	Ekaterina Sazonova	Maya Kolobovnikova	
2023	Moscow	Ksenia Kolyadina	Sofia Kopylova	Nicole Rimarachin Diaz	
2024	Moscow	Kira Yablochnikova	Anna Rekvava	Anna Repina	
2025	Moscow	Sofia Ilteryakova	Sofia Lantsova	Kristina Voytenko	
2026	Kazan	Ksenia Savinova	Yana Zaikina	Eva Chevtaeva	

=== First Class ===
Year	Location	Gold	Silver	Bronze	Ref.
2009	Dmitrov	Yana Kudryavtseva	Oksana Kondrya	Diana Borisova	
2010	St. Petersburg	Evgenia Ivashchenko	Arina Averina	Dina Averina	
2011	Samara	Yulia Bravikova	Olesya Petrova	Anna Korneeva	
2012	Kazan	Ksenia Polyakova	Karina Kuznetsova	Daria Osminina	
2013					
2014					
2015	Kazan	Polina Shmatko	Kristina Telyatnikova	Yulia Kutlaeva	
2016	Kazan	Lala Kramarenko	Anastasia Simakova	Dana Semirenko	
2017	Kazan	Alexandra Skubova	Ekaterina Panteleeva	Maria Markevich	
2018	Kazan	Anna Popova	Maria Ermolaeva	Lidia Chernishova	
2019	Kazan	Anna Popova	Safina Nafikova	Maria Borisova	
2020	Moscow	Anika Rashitova	Glafira Morzukhina	Elizaveta Maeva	
2021	Moscow	Anna Popova	Maria Borisova	Vladislava Sharonova	

== See also ==
- Russian Rhythmic Gymnastics Championships
