= Anna Kamenshchikova =

Belarusian rhythmic gymnast

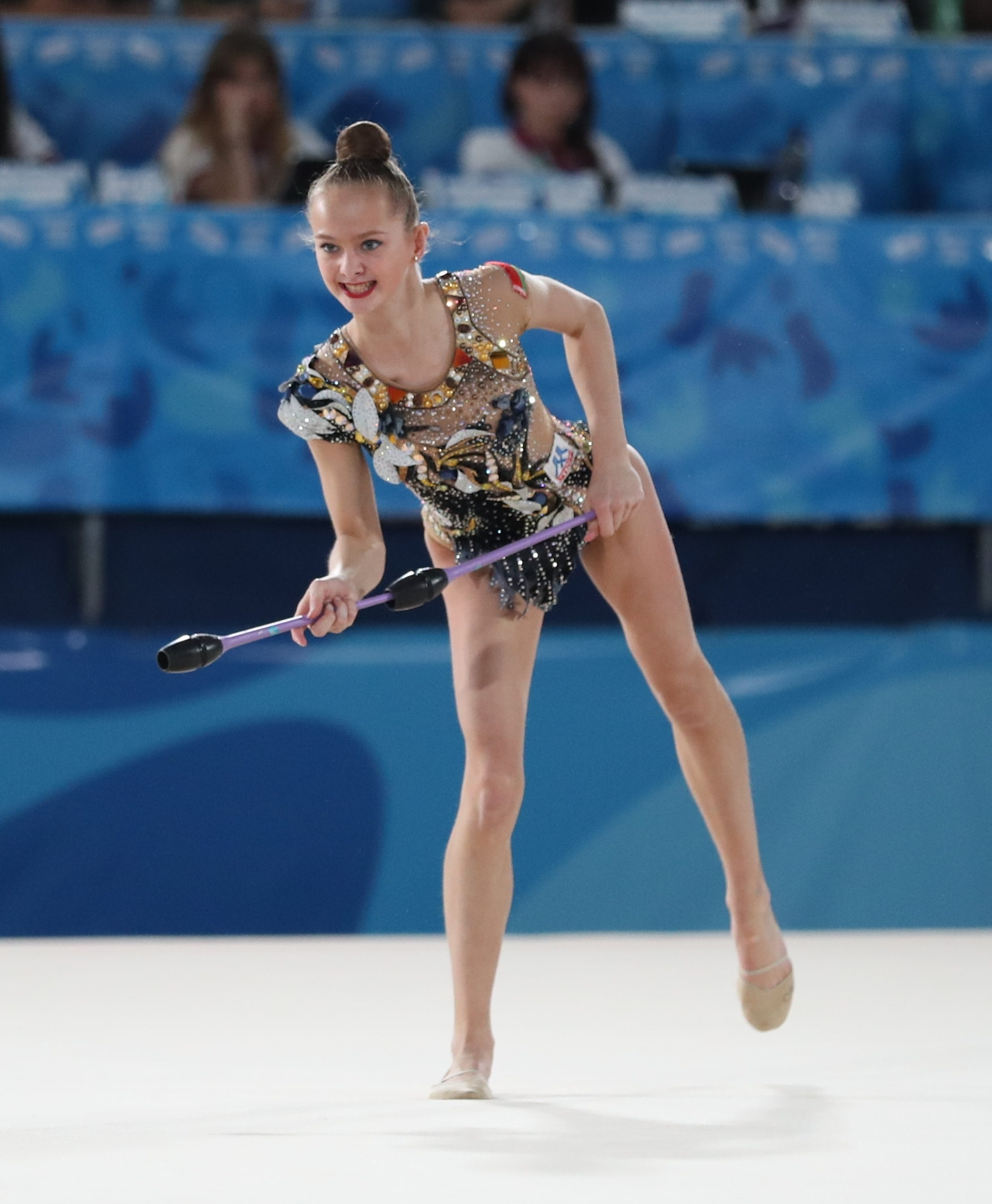
- Full name: Anna Romanovana Kamenshchikova
- Alternative name: Hanna Romanovana Kamenshchykava
- Nickname: Anya
- Born: 9 August 2003 (age 23) Nakhodka, Primorsky Krai, Russia
- Height: 162 cm (5 ft 4 in)

Gymnastics career
- Discipline: Rhythmic gymnastics
- Country represented: Belarus; Authorised Neutral Athletes (since 2026) (2018-present)
- Club: Rhythmic Gymnastics Centre of Olympic Preparation
- Head coach: Irina Leparskaya
- Assistant coach: Marina Lobatch
- Former coach: Alla Dimchoglo
Medal record
Representing Belarus
Rhythmic Gymnastics
Junior European Championships
Silver medal – second place	2018 Guadalajara	Clubs

Anna Romanovana Kamenshchikova (Russian: Анна Романовна Каменщикова; born 9 August 2003) is a Russian individual rhythmic gymnast representing Belarus.

== Career ==
Anna was born in Russia, in the city of Nakhodka, where she began practicing rhythmic gymnastics at the age of four. Her first coach, Alla Dimchoglo, was from Belarus and invited her to move there. She later relocated to Minsk in 2008.

=== Junior ===
In February 2018, Anna participated at qualification event for the Youth Olympic Games in Moscow, Russia, where she took 4th place in all-around. She won bronze medal in team competition at Sofia Cup. At the 2018 European Championships in Guadalajara, Spain, Anna, her teammate Yana Striga, and senior group took 5th place in team competition. She won silver medal in the clubs final behind Daria Trubnikova, and was 7th in ball final. She was then selected to represent Belarus at the 2018 Summer Youth Olympics, and she took 4th place in the individual all-around. She also took 8th place in the mixed team competition.

=== Senior ===
Kamenshchikova became age eligible for senior competition in 2019. That year she won bronze medal in all-around at Belarusian National Championship. She also took silver with clubs and bronze with hoop. She competed at Baltic Hoop tournament in Riga, and won gold with ball and silver in all-around and ribbon.

In 2021, she competed at World Challenge Cup Cluj-Napoca, and took 9th place in all-around. She qualified to clubs final, finishing 8th. She won silver in all-around at international tournament in Tel Aviv.

In 2026, she returned to the international stage competing under the neutral status. She participated in European Cup in Baku. She qualified to cross battles, but lost in the first round against her teammate Darya Viarenich. She took 16th place in clubs and 9th in ribbon. In June, she competed at Beijing World Challenge Cup, finishing 11th in all-around. She qualified to two apparatus finals, placing 5th in clubs and 7th in ball final.

== Routine music information ==
Year	Apparatus	Music title
2026
2026	Hoop	
2026	Ball	
2026	Clubs	Solstice (Ahee Remix) by Savej
2026	Ribbon	
2018
2018	Hoop	Cannon in D minor by Two Steps From Hell, Thomas Bergersen
2018	Ball	
2018	Clubs	Black Gold by Sarah Nemtanu, Armand Amar
2018	Ribbon	

== See also ==
- List of medalists at the Rhythmic Gymnastics Junior European Championships
