= Maria Borisova (gymnast) =

Russian rhythmic gymnast

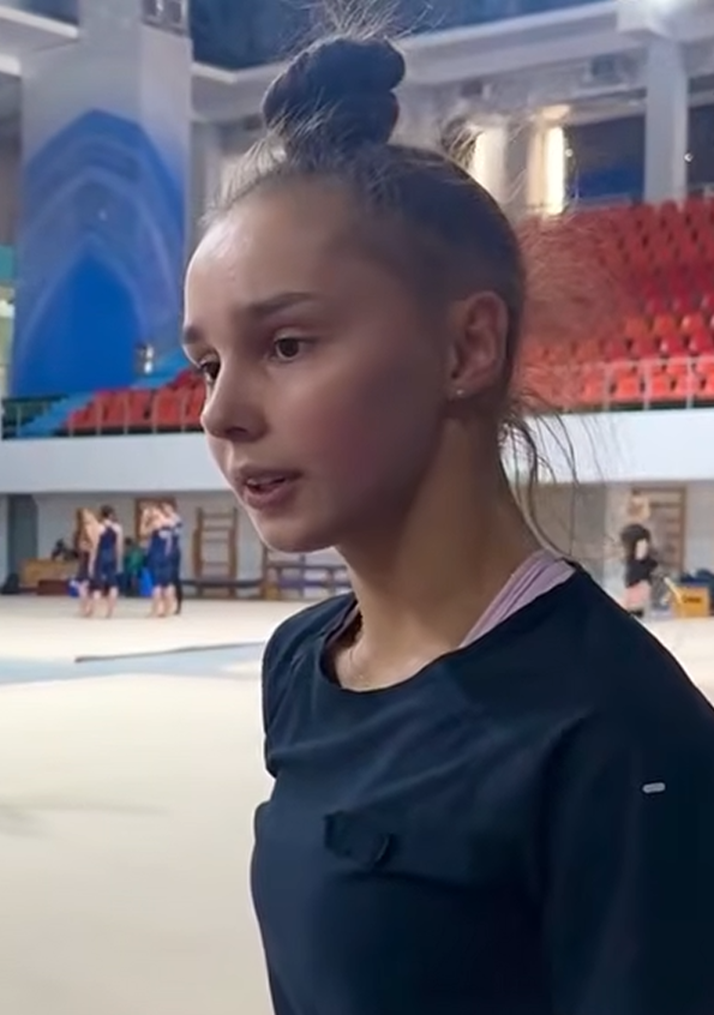
- Maria Borisova in 2026
- Full name: Maria Dmitrievna Borisova
- Alternative names: Mariia, Mariya
- Nicknames: Mashulya, Masha
- Born: 17 April 2007 (age 19) Saint Petersburg, Russia

Gymnastics career
- Discipline: Rhythmic gymnastics
- Country represented: Russia (2019-present) Authorised Neutral Athletes (2026)
- Club: Sky Grace
- Head coaches: Tatiana Sergaeva, Alina Kabaeva
- Assistant coach: Irina Gusarova
- Choreographer: Lyudmila Duganova, Irina Zenovka
Medal record
Representing Authorised Neutral Athletes and Russia
Rhythmic Gymnastics
Event	1st	2nd	3rd
World Championships	1	0	3
European Championships	0	1	2
Grand Prix	1	2	4
World Cup	1	1	0
Total	3	4	9
World Championships
Gold medal – first place	2026 Frankfurt	Team
Bronze medal – third place	2026 Frankfurt	Ball
Bronze medal – third place	2026 Frankfurt	Clubs
Bronze medal – third place	2026 Frankfurt	Ribbon
European Championships
Silver medal – second place	2026 Varna	Clubs
Bronze medal – third place	2026 Varna	Team
Bronze medal – third place	2026 Varna	Ribbon
European Cup
Gold medal – first place	2026 Baku	Ribbon
Bronze medal – third place	2026 Baku	Ball
BRICS Games
Gold medal – first place	2024 Kazan	Hoop
Silver medal – second place	2024 Kazan	All-around

Maria Dmitrievna Borisova (Russian: Мария Дмитриевна Борисова; off. sp.: Mariia Borisova; born 17 April 2007) is a Russian individual rhythmic gymnast. She is the 2024 BRICS Games hoop champion and individual all-around silver medalist. She is also the 2026 European silver medalist in clubs and bronze medalist in the ribbon and team competition.

On the national level, she is the 2025 Russian national champion and the 2023 national silver medalist. On the junior level, she is the 2022 junior national all-around champion, the 2021 national silver medalist, and the 2019 national bronze medalist.

== Personal life ==
Maria Dmitrievna Borisova was born on April 17, 2007 in Saint Petersburg, Russia.

== Career ==
=== Junior ===
Maria Borisova began training in rhythmic gymnastics at the age of three at Sports School No. 1 in the Frunzensky District of her hometown. At the age of five, she began training under the guidance of Irina Gusarova at the Zhemchuzhina Center of Rhythmic Gymnastics. When her parents brought her to coach Irina Gusarova for the first time, Maria was not accepted into training, as no group for her age category had been formed. Despite this, she expressed a strong desire to pursue rhythmic gymnastics and hugged Irina Gusarova tightly, refusing to leave. This encounter marked the beginning of their collaboration.

In 2019, Borisova was the bronze medalist of the Russian Junior Championships. At age 12, she joined the national junior team. In 2021, she was the national junior all-around silver medalist and champion in the ball exercise. During the 2022 season, she became the Russian Junior champion in the all-around and clubs exercise. The same year, the FIG banned all Russian and Belarusian athletes from competing in international competitions.

=== Senior ===
==== 2023-2025 ====
Borisova debuted as a senior in 2023. Due to Russia’s ban from international competitions following the invasion of Ukraine, Borisova was only able to compete in domestic events. She was the champion in the hoop exercise at the 2023 Moscow Grand Prix and the all-around silver medalist at the 2023 Russian Championships.

She placed second at the 2024 Moscow Grand Prix, 0.05 point ahead of teammate Vladislava Sharonova. Later that year, she was selected to represent Russia at the 2024 BRICS Games alongside Lala Kramarenko, Anna Popova, and Diana Chugunikhina. She placed first in the hoop exercise and second in the all-around final ahead of Olympian Anastasiia Salos. Borisova described the games as the most difficult tournament she has trained for and competed in thus far, though not to the level of the Olympics, as the competing gymnasts were mostly Russian. In July 2024, Borisova began training at the Alina Kabaeva Academy of Rhythmic Gymnastics Sky Grace in Sochi.

In 2025, she became the Russian all-around national champion.

==== 2026: International Senior Debut ====
In early 2026, she took 4th place in the all-around at the Russian National Championships. In March, she made her international debut competing as an Authorised Neutral Athlete at the Marbella Grand Prix. She took 9th place in the all-around and also won silver in ribbon and bronze in the hoop final. In April, she won the silver medal in the all-around behind Alina Harnasko at the Thiais Grand Prix. She also won the gold medal in clubs and bronze medals in the hoop, ball and ribbon finals.

The following weekend, she competed in her first World Cup in Tashkent, where she won the all-around gold ahead of Olympic champion Darja Varfolomeev. She qualified for all four apparatus finals, finishing seventh in both the clubs final (25.75) and the ball final (25.25), and eighth in the ribbon final. In the hoop final, she won the silver medal with a score of 28.55. In May, she competed at European Cup in Baku and won a gold medal in ribbon and bronze in ball. In the cross-battle, she lost to Israeli gymnast Daniela Munits in the first round. From May 14 to 16, she competed at the second stage of the "Strongest Cup" in Moscow. The competition also served as a control training for the upcoming European Championships. Borisova won the all-around with a score of 120,10. On May 16, the Executive Committee decided to lift all restrictions on the participation of Russian and Belarusian athletes (since 2022), effective immediately. As a result, Borisova was able to continue representing Russia.

She was selected represent the Russian Federation at the 2026 European Championships in Varna, Bulgaria alongside teammates Sofia Ilteryakova and Eva Kononova. Borisova qualified for the all-around final in 11th place with a total score of 83.300 after committing errors in both her hoop and ball routine. In the all-around final, she finished sixth with a total score of 114.450, placing ahead of Tara Dragas of Italy. In the team competition, she and her Russian teammates won the bronze medal, behind Bulgaria and Israel. In the apparatus finals, she received silver in the clubs and bronze in the ribbon final. In July, she competed at Milan World Cup and took 9th place in all-around, after mistakes in clubs and ribbon routines.

From August 12 to August 16, Borisova participated at her first World Championships in Frankfurt, Germany. She shared team gold together with Sofia Ilteriakova, Agata Barekzay, Alisa Eremeeva, Arina Lavrenova, Daria Melnik, Anna Nikolaeva and Sofiaa Solonskaia. She qualified for the all-around final in third place, behind Darja Varfolomeev and Stiliana Nikolova. She ultimately placed fifth in the all-around final with a combined score of 116.00. Furthermore, Borisova qualified for all four apparatus finals, placing last in the hoop final due to a major drop, and winning the bronze medal in the ball, clubs and ribbon final.

Later in the year, she competed at the Aeon Cup in Tokyo, with her teammates Sofia Ilteriakova and Yana Zaikina. They represented the Sky Grace, which won the gold medal in front of Burlo/Pacific club and Deriugina school. In the senior all-around, Borisova won a silver medal in front of Megan Chu.

== Competitive highlights ==
Year	Event	Team	AA	Hoop	Ball	Clubs	Ribb.
International
2026	European Championships	3rd	6th			2nd	3rd
2026	World Championships	1st	5th	8th	3rd	3rd	3rd
2026	Aeon Cup	1st	2nd				
National
2026	Russian Championships		4th				

== Routine music information ==
Year	Apparatus	Music Title
2026	Hoop	Wintersun (Yoad Nevo Mix) by Bond / Kinckoff by Josh Leake
2026	Ball (second)	The Cad - Really Slow Motion & Giant Apes
2026	Ball (first)	Очи чёрные by EgorGayduk
2026	Clubs	Alatau by Otyken
2026	Ribbon	Bolero by Shlomo, The Swingle Singers & The Vocal Orchestra
2025	Hoop (first)	My love...Music and Solo Darbuka by Artem Uzunov
2025	Hoop (second)	Wintersun (Yoad Nevo Mix) by Bond / Kinckoff by Josh Leake
2025	Ball (first)	Не исчезай by Галина Беседина and Сергей Тараненко
2025	Ball (second)	Caravan (From the film Ocean's 13 (OST)) by Puccio Roelens Orchestra
2025	Clubs	Betray The Queen by Brand X Music
2025	Ribbon (first)	Московская кадриль by ЧИБАТУХА
2025	Ribbon (second)	Bolero by Shlomo, The Swingle Singers & The Vocal Orchestra
2024	Hoop	
2024	Ball	
2024	Clubs (second)	Betray The Queen by Brand X Music
2024	Clubs (first)	Kalinka - Nikolay Baskov
2024	Ribbon	Московская кадриль by ЧИБАТУХА
2023	Hoop	Shchedrin Concerto for Orchestra No.1 Naughty Limericks by Russian National Orchestra
2023	Ball	Восточные сказки - Блестящие
2023	Clubs	That That by PSY feat. SUGA
2023	Ribbon	Tsigany by Moiseyev Dance Ensemble
2022	Hoop	Shchedrin Concerto for Orchestra No.1 Naughty Limericks by Russian National Orchestra
2022	Ball	Salut by Hélène Ségara & Joe Dassin
2022	Clubs	
2022	Ribbon	
