= Eva Kononova =

Russian rhythmic gymnast

- Full name: Eva Olegovna Kononova
- Born: 28 November 2009 (age 16) Tyumen Oblast, Russia

Gymnastics career
- Discipline: Rhythmic gymnastics
- Country represented: Russia Authorised Neutral Athletes (2026–present)
- Club: Sky Grace
Medal record
Rhythmic Gymnastics
Representing Russia
European Championships
Bronze medal – third place	2026 Varna	Team

Eva Olegovna Kononova (Russian: Ева Олеговна Кононова; born 28 November 2009) is a Russian individual rhythmic gymnast. She is the 2026 Russian hoop champion and all-around bronze medallist.

== Early life ==
Kononova is a native of the Tyumen Oblast.

== Career ==
=== Senior ===
She debuted as a senior in early 2025.

In 2025, she competed at the Russian Championships, placing 36th in the all-around qualification and not advancing to the final.

In June 2025, she moved to the Sky Grace academy, where she started training under Evgenia Eliseeva and Olga Minigalina.

In 2026, she again competed at the Russian Championships, this time placing 2nd in the all-around qualification and winning bronze in the all-around final behind Arina Kovshova and Sofia Ilteriakova.

In late May 2026, it was reported that she would replace Arina Kovshova at the European Rhythmic Gymnastics Championships in Varna, Bulgaria.

== Competitive highlights ==
Year	Event	Team	AA	Hoop	Ball	Clubs	Ribb.
International
2026	European Championships	3rd					
National
2026	Russian Championships		3rd				
