= Yana Zaikina =

Russian rhythmic gymnast

- Full name: Yana Alekseyevna Zaikina
- Alternative name: Iana Zaikina
- Born: 6 March 2011 (age 15) Volgograd, Russia

Gymnastics career
- Discipline: Rhythmic gymnastics
- Country represented: Russia; (2026-)
- Club: Sky Grace
- Head coach: Evgeniya Eliseeva
- Assistant coach: Olga Minigalina
- Choreographer: Elena Egorova
Medal record
Representing Russia and Authorised Neutral Athletes
Junior European Championships
Gold medal – first place	2026 Varna	Ribbon
European Cup
Gold medal – first place	2026 Baku	Team
Gold medal – first place	2026 Baku	Ribbon
Silver medal – second place	2026 Baku	Clubs

Yana Alekseyevna Zaikina (Russian: Яна Алексеевна Заикина; off. sp.: Iana Zaikina; born 6 March 2011) is a Russian individual rhythmic gymnast.

On the junior level, she is the 2026 national all-around, clubs, and hoop silver and ribbon bronze medallist and European ribbon champion.

== Early life and career ==
Zaikina was born on 6 March 2011. She took up folk dance before, at the age of six, turning to gymnastics. She initially trained under Elizaveta Chernova at the Pride sports club in Volgograd. In 2023, she moved to Sochi to train at the Sky Grace academy.

=== Junior ===
In the spring of 2026 at the Russian junior championships, she won silver medals in all-around, clubs, and hoop, all behind Ksenia Savinova, and a bronze in ribbon, behind Savinova and Naifonova. In late April, she competed in the junior division of the 2026 Rhythmic Gymnastics European Cup in Baku, Azerbaijan, winning team gold and two individual medals: gold in ribbon and silver in clubs. In late May, she competed at the 2026 European championships in Varna, Bulgaria, and won the gold medal in the junior ribbon final. The medal ceremony marked the first time in five years that the Russian anthem was played at a European Championships. Silver medalist Ukrainian Sofiia Krainska stood on the podium with covered ears and closed eyes. In October, she competed at the International tournament Aura Cup in Croatia and won the silver medal in the all-around behind her teammate Alesia Naifonova. She won gold medal in ribbon and silver in hoop. Later in the year, she competed at the Aeon Cup in Tokyo, with her teammates Mariia Borisova and Sofia Ilteriakova. They represented the Sky Grace, which won the gold medal in front of Burlo/Pacific club and Deriugina school. In the junior all-around, Zaikina won a gold medal in front of Anna Filipp and Mariia Miachina.

== Competitive highlights ==
Year	Event	Team	AA	Hoop	Ball	Clubs	Ribb.
International
2026	Aeon Cup	1st	1st J				
International junior
2026	European Championships						1st
National
2026	Russian Junior Championships		2nd	2nd		2nd	3rd

== Routine music information ==
Year	Apparatus	Music Title
2027	Hoop	
2027	Ball	
2027	Clubs	
2027	Ribbon	
2026	Hoop	Thule by Travis Lake / The Quidditch World Cup (from Harry Potter and the Goblet of Fire) by Patrick Doyle
2026	Ball	Altay by Ummet Ozcan, Otyken
2026	Clubs	Pagati (Radio Edit) by Sagi Abitbul
2026	Ribbon	

== Personal life ==
Zaikina enjoys bead embroidery as a hobby.
