= Daria Pridannikova =

Russian rhythmic gymnast (born 2002)

- Full name: Daria Dmitrievna Pridannikova
- Nickname: Dasha
- Born: February 2, 2002 (age 24) Yekaterinburg, Sverdlovsk Oblast, Russia

Gymnastics career
- Discipline: Rhythmic gymnastics
- Country represented: Russia (2013-present)
- Club: Olympics Sports Palace - Ekaterinburg
- Gym: Novogorsk
- Head coach: Irina Viner
- Assistant coach: Marina Nikolaeva
- Former coach: Larisa Kuznetsova
- Choreographer: Tatiana Pomerantseva

Daria Dmitrievna Pridannikova (Russian: Дарья Дмитриевна Приданникова, born February 2, 2002, in Ekaterinburg, Sverdlovsk Oblast, Russia) is a Russian individual rhythmic gymnast. She is the 2016 Junior Grand Prix Final All-around champion. At national level, she is the 2015 Russian Junior all-around bronze medalist.

== Career ==
=== Junior ===
Pridannikova started gymnastics at age 3 years old in her home city in Ekaterinburg following the example of her older sister. In 2013, she became member of the Russian junior national team. She won silver medal in the all-around at the prestigious "2014 Hope of Russia". In 2015 season, Pridannikova competed at the Junior Grand Prix in Moscow. She won the all-around bronze at the 2015 Russian Junior Championships. At the 2015 Junior World Cup Bucharest, Pridannikova won the all-around gold, in apparatus final: she won gold in rope, and silver medals in hoop and ball. At the Junior World Cup in Tashkent, she again came first in the individual all-around. At the series final of the Junior World Cup in Kazan, she won silver in the individual all-around and together with teammates (Alina Ermolova, Anna Sokolova and Maria Sergeeva) won the team gold.

In 2016 season, Priadannikova started her competition at the Moscow Junior Grand Prix. At the 2016 Baltic Hoop, she then won bronze in the individual all-around. Pridannikova together with Polina Shmatko competed at the Junior World Cup in Lisbon where they won the team gold. Pridannikova was cut short early in the season as she suffered an injury. In September, Pridnannikova returned to competition and was selected to compete at the 2016 Junior Grand Prix Final in Eilat, Israel where she won the all-around gold medal.

In 2017 season, Pridannikova competed at the Luxembourg Trophy where she won the all-around gold medal. On June 8–10, Prdannikova won gold in all-around in rhythmic gymnastics discipline at the Russian Youth Student Games "2017 Summer Spartakiada".
