= Dea Emilova =

Bulgarian rhythmic gymnast (born 2011)

- Full name: Dea Emilova
- Alternative name: Деа Емилова
- Born: 18 July 2011 (age 15) Sofia, Bulgaria

Gymnastics career
- Discipline: Rhythmic gymnastics
- Country represented: Bulgaria; (2025-)
- Club: Academic
- Head coach: Silvia Stoyneva
Medal record
Representing Bulgaria
Rhythmic gymnastics
Junior European Championships
| Gold medal – first place | 2026 Varna | Team |
| Silver medal – second place | 2026 Varna | Clubs |
European Cup
| Silver medal – second place | 2026 Baku | Team |
| Silver medal – second place | 2026 Baku | Ribbon |

Dea Emilova (Bulgarian: Деа Емилова; born 18 July 2011) is a Bulgarian rhythmic gymnast. She represents Bulgaria in international competitions.

== Career ==
=== Junior ===
In 2025, Siyana won gold medal in hoop at International tournament Pharaoh's Cup in Cairo. In May, she won silver medals in ball and clubs and bronze medals in hoop and ribbon finals at Bulgarian National Championships. At 3rd Balkan Championships in November, she won bronze medal in hoop final.

In 2026, Emilova started the season competing at Miss Valentine International tournament and won gold medal in team competition with Siyana Alekova. She also won gold medal in clubs and silver in ball final. In March, she won gold medal in all-around at International tournament Aphrodite Cup in Greece. She won gold medals in ball and ribbon finals and bronze in hoop. In April, she won gold medals in clubs and ribbon at International tournament Sofia Cup. In May, she took part in European Cup in Baku, Azerbaijan. Together with her teammates Siyana Alekova and Aleksandra Petrova she won silver medal in team competition. She also won silver medal in ribbon and placed 5th in clubs. She won gold medals in clubs and ribbon finals at Bulgarian National Championships. She was selected to represent Bulgaria alongside Siyana Alekova and Aleksandra Petrova at 2026 European Championships in Varna, Bulgaria. They won gold medal in team competition. Dea also won silver medal in clubs final behind Nita Jamagidze and 7th place in ribbon.

== Routine music information ==
| Year | Apparatus | Music title |
|---|---|---|
| 2026 | Hoop | Tears of a Clown by Rejane Magloire, Mark Landson |
| 2026 | Ball | Macavity (From The Motion Picture Soundtrack Cats) by Taylor Swift |
| 2026 | Clubs | |
| 2026 | Ribbon | La Nave del Olvido by Mon Laferte |
