= Elena Karpushenko =

Russian rhythmic gymnast (1961–2024)

- Елена Карпушенко
- Born: 26 May 1961; Moscow, Russian SFSR, USSR
- Died: 23 April 2024 (aged 62)
- Occupation: Rhythmic gymnastics coach
- Known for: Russian rhythmic gymnastics trainer in the Olympic reserve school for rhythmic gymnastics and in Novogorsk

Elena Lvovna Karpushenko (Russian: Елена Львовна Карпушенко; 26 May 1961 – 23 April 2024) was a Russian honored Master of Sports coach in rhythmic gymnastics.

== Coaching career ==
Karpushenko was the personal coach of three-time World all-around champion and World record holder Yana Kudryavtseva. She was introduced by a swimming coach, who was friends with the Kudryavtsev family to their daughter, Yana. Karpushenko was the trainer of Kudryavtseva from when she started rhythmic gymnastics.

== Personal life and death ==
Karpushenko was born in Moscow, RSFSR, USSR on 26 May 1961, and died on 23 April 2024, at the age of 62.

== Notable trainees ==
- Yana Kudryavtseva – 2016 Olympic silver medalist, Three-time World All-around champion, 2015 European Games champion.
- Alina Ermolova – 2016 European Junior Champion in rope.
- Tatiana Kurbakova – 2004 Olympics Gold medal in Group all around.
- Alexandra Ermakova – 2006 European Junior Champion in rope.
- Maria Pobedushkina - Member of the Russian Senior National Team
- Alexandra Borisova - Member of the Russian Junior Team
