= 2026 Rhythmic Gymnastics European Cup =

Rhythmic gymnastics competition

- Venue: National Gymnastics Arena
- Location: Baku, Azerbaijan
- Start date: April 30
- End date: May 3

The 2026 Rhythmic Gymnastics European Cup was the third European Cup in rhythmic gymnastics. The competition was held at the National Gymnastics Arena in Baku, Azerbaijan from 30 April to 3 May 2026.

== Participating countries ==
- Authorised Neutral Athletes
- Albania
- Andorra
- Azerbaijan
- Bulgaria
- Croatia
- Cyprus
- Spain
- Estonia
- Finland
- France
- United Kingdom
- Georgia
- Greece
- Guatemala
- Hungary
- Israel
- Italy
- Kuwait
- Lebanon
- Lithuania
- Luxembourg
- North Macedonia
- Montenegro
- Poland
- Romania
- Serbia
- Switzerland
- Syria
- Turkey
- Ukraine
- Uzbekistan
- Venezuela

== Competition schedule ==
- Thursday April 30
  - Juniors Individual Qualification with apparatus finals ranking
  - Award ceremonies Junior Individual
  - Junior Groups Qualification & All-around ranking (5 Balls, 5 Ribbons)
  - Award ceremonies Junior Groups All-around ranking
- Friday May 1
  - Senior Individual Qualification & Apparatus ranking, with Hoop and Ball
  - Award ceremonies, Senior Individual Hoop and Ball
  - Junior Teams Cross Battles
  - Award ceremony Junior Teams Cross Battle
- Saturday May 2
  - Senior Individual Qualification & Apparatus ranking, Clubs and Ribbon
  - Award ceremonies, Senior Individual Clubs and Ribbon
  - Senior Groups Qualification & Apparatus ranking, 5 Balls and 3 Hoops + 2 Clubs
  - Award ceremonies, Senior Groups 5 Balls and 3 Hoops + 2 Clubs
- Sunday May 3
  - Senior Individual Cross Battles
  - Award ceremony Senior Individual Cross Battle
  - Senior Group Cross Battles
  - Award ceremony Senior Group Cross Battle

== Medal winners ==
Event	Gold	Silver	Bronze
Senior Group Finals
Cross Battle	Bulgaria; Raya Bozhilova; Sofia Ivanova; Magdalina Minevska; Emilia Obretenova; Magdalena Valkova; Margarita Vasileva	Israel; Agam Gev; Avigail Shved; Arina Gvozdetskaia; Sofia Prezhyn; Keren Sobol; Taisiia Sokolenko	Authorised Neutral Athletes; Alena Seliverstova; Alina Proshchalykina; Daria Melnik; Nelli Reutskaia; Zlata Remchukova; Nikol Androchik (AIN2)
5 Balls	Israel; Agam Gev; Avigail Shved; Arina Gvozdetskaia; Sofia Prezhyn; Keren Sobol; Taisiia Sokolenko	Authorised Neutral Athletes; Palina Aliaksandrava; Sofya Barysevich; Valeryia Malkovich; Hanna Shakun; Kiriana Shevtsova; Taisa Yerchak (AIN1)	Italy; Chiara Badii; Sasha Mukhina; Serena Ottaviani; Gaia Pozzi; Sofia Sicignano; Bianca Vignozzi
3 Hoops + 2 Clubs	Authorised Neutral Athletes; Alena Seliverstova; Alina Proshchalykina; Daria Melnik; Nelli Reutskaia; Zlata Remchukova; Nikol Androchik (AIN2)	Authorised Neutral Athletes; Palina Aliaksandrava; Sofya Barysevich; Valeryia Malkovich; Hanna Shakun; Kiriana Shevtsova; Taisa Yerchak (AIN1)	Ukraine; Yelyzaveta Azza; Diana Baieva; Polina Horodnycha; Valeriia Peremeta; Kira Shyrykina; Oleksandra Yushchak
Senior Individual Finals
Cross Battle	(Israel) Daniela Munits	(Ukraine) Taisiia Onofriichuk	(Italy) Sofia Raffaeli
Hoop	(Ukraine) Taisiia Onofriichuk	(Authorised Neutral Athletes) Arina Kovshova (AIN2)	(Authorised Neutral Athletes) Darya Viarenich (AIN1)
Ball	(Authorised Neutral Athletes) Arina Kovshova (AIN2)	(Italy) Sofia Raffaeli	(Cyprus) Vera Tugolukova
Clubs	(Israel) Daniela Munits	(Authorised Neutral Athletes) Darya Viarenich (AIN1)	(Italy) Sofia Raffaeli
Ribbon	(Authorised Neutral Athletes) Maria Borisova (AIN2)	(Ukraine) Taisiia Onofriichuk	(Italy) Tara Dragas
Junior Individual Finals
Team Cross Battle	Authorised Neutral Athletes; Kseniia Savinova; Iana Zaikina (AIN 2)	Bulgaria; Siyana Alekova; Dea Emilova; Aleksandra Petrova	Israel; Rebekka Miller; Alice Rozenberg
Hoop	(Authorised Neutral Athletes) Kseniia Savinova (AIN2)	(Romania) Patricia Stanciu	(Ukraine) Sofiia Kulikova
Ball	(Authorised Neutral Athletes) Kseniia Savinova (AIN2)	(Bulgaria) Aleksandra Petrova	(Uzbekistan) Sabina Kagirova
Clubs	(Georgia (country)) Nita Jamagidze	(Authorised Neutral Athletes) Iana Zaikina (AIN2)	(Ukraine) Sofiia Krainska
Ribbon	(Authorised Neutral Athletes) Iana Zaikina (AIN2)	(Bulgaria) Dea Emilova	(Israel) Alice Rozenberg
Junior Group Finals
All-Around	Uzbekistan; Kamilla Astanova; Ornella Bikmaeva; Alisiya Galati; Safiya Pulatova; Zamira Khvalcheva; Farida Abdulova		

== Results ==
=== Seniors ===
==== 5 Balls ====
Rank	Nation	D Score	A Score	E Score	Pen	Total
1st place, gold medalist(s)	Israel	12.800	7.050	6.550	0.000	26.400
2nd place, silver medalist(s)	(Authorised Neutral Athletes) (AIN1)	12.500	7.250	6.400	0.000	26.150
3rd place, bronze medalist(s)	Italy	12.500	6.950	6.200	0.000	25.640
4	(Authorised Neutral Athletes) (AIN2)	12.600	7.000	6.050	0.000	25.550
5	Ukraine	12.100	6.600	5.800	0.300	24.200
6	Bulgaria	11.400	6.550	5.550	0.000	23.500
7	Cyprus	10.800	6.150	5.800	0.000	22.750
8	Romania	10.400	6.650	5.550	0.000	22.600

==== 3 Hoops + 2 Clubs ====
Rank	Nation	D Score	A Score	E Score	Pen	Total
1st place, gold medalist(s)	(Authorised Neutral Athletes) (AIN2)	13.500	7.150	6.600	0.000	27.250
2nd place, silver medalist(s)	(Authorised Neutral Athletes) (AIN1)	13.300	7.250	6.150	0.000	26.700
3rd place, bronze medalist(s)	Ukraine	12.700	7.350	6.500	0.000	26.550
4	Bulgaria	12.200	6.150	4.700	0.300	22.750
5	Azerbaijan	10.800	6.450	5.350	0.00	22.600
6	Finland	10.600	6.250	5.450	0.000	22.300
7	Israel	10.600	6.450	4.850	0.050	21.850
8	Italy	10.800	6.250	4.700	0.000	21.750

==== Cross battles last 6 round with 5 Balls ====
Group 1	Score	Group 2	Score
(Authorised Neutral Athletes) (AIN2)	25.750	Italy	23.750
Ukraine	25.650	Israel	27.800
(Authorised Neutral Athletes) (AIN1)	21.400	Bulgaria	27.950

5 Balls

Rank	Nation	D Score	A Score	E Score	Pen	Total
W	(Authorised Neutral Athletes) (AIN2)	11.700	7.000	7.150	0.100	25.750
	Italy	10.600	6.800	6.350		23.750
	Ukraine	12.30	7.300	6.050		25.650
W	Israel	13.300	7.650	6.850		27.800
	(Authorised Neutral Athletes) (AIN1)	10.700	6.500	4.800	0.600	21.400
W	Bulgaria	13.200	7.750	7.000		27.950

Cross battles last 3 round with 3 Hoops + 2 Clubs

Group 1	Score	Group 2	Score	Group 3	Score
(Authorised Neutral Athletes) (AIN2)	26.800	Israel	27.050	Bulgaria	27.350

3 Hoops + 2 Clubs

Rank	Nation	D Score	A Score	E Score	Pen	Total
1st place, gold medalist(s)	Bulgaria	13.400	7.550	6.400		27.350
2nd place, silver medalist(s)	Israel	13.100	7.300	6.650		27.050
3rd place, bronze medalist(s)	(Authorised Neutral Athletes) (AIN2)	12.500	7.300	7.000		26.800

=== Individuals ===
(one gymnast per country)

==== Hoop ====
Rank	Gymnast	Nation	D Score	A Score	E Score	Pen	Total
1st place, gold medalist(s)	Taisiia Onofriichuk	Ukraine	14.1	8.150	7.900	0.000	30.150
2nd place, silver medalist(s)	Arina Kovshova	(Authorised Neutral Athletes) (AIN2)	12.6	8.000	7.800	0.000	28.400
3rd place, bronze medalist(s)	Darya Viarenich	(Authorised Neutral Athletes) (AIN1)	12.6	7.650	7.700	0.000	27.950
4	Tara Dragas	Italy	12.4	8.000	7.550	0.000	27.950
5	Vera Tugolukova	Cyprus	12.4	7.750	7.500	0.000	27.650
6	Andreea Verdes	Romania	12.1	7.800	7.550	0.000	27.450
7	Alona Tal Franco	Israel	12.0	7.700	7.450	0.000	27.150
8	Hatice Gokce Emir	Turkey	12.0	7.650	7.150	0.000	26.800

==== Ball ====
Rank	Gymnast	Nation	D Score	A Score	E Score	Pen	Total
1st place, gold medalist(s)	Arina Kovshova	(Authorised Neutral Athletes) (AIN2)	12.5	8.100	8.000	0.000	28.600
2nd place, silver medalist(s)	Sofia Raffaeli	Italy	12.2	8.100	7.700	0.000	28.000
3rd place, bronze medalist(s)	Vera Tugolukova	Cyprus	11.9	7.750	7.600	0.000	27.250
4	Taisiia Onofriichuk	Ukraine	12.2	7.650	7.250	0.000	27.100
5	Daniela Munits	Israel	11.6	7.600	7.400	0.000	26.600
6	Darya Viarenich	(Authorised Neutral Athletes) (AIN1)	11.3	7.600	7.600	0.000	26.500
7	Fanni Pigniczki	Hungary	11.2	7.700	7.500	0.000	26.400
8	Andreea Verdes	Romania	10.500	7.850	7.650	0.000	26.000

==== Clubs ====
Rank	Gymnast	Nation	D Score	A Score	E Score	Pen	Total
1st place, gold medalist(s)	Daniela Munits	Israel	12.9	7.850	7.900	0.000	28.650
2nd place, silver medalist(s)	Darya Viarenich	(Authorised Neutral Athletes) (AIN1)	12.6	7.850	7.900	0.000	28.350
2nd place, silver medalist(s)	Sofia Raffaeli	Italy	12.4	7.950	7.850	0.000	28.200
4	Arina Kovshova	(Authorised Neutral Athletes) (AIN2)	12.5	7.900	7.700	0.000	28.100
5	Andreea Verdes	Romania	12.3	7.600	7.800	0.000	27.700
6	Taisiia Onofriichuk	Ukraine	12.4	7.900	7.400	0.000	27.700
7	Vera Tugolukova	Cyprus	12.2	7.800	7.650	0.050	27.600
8	Hatice Gokce Emir	Turkey	12.1	7.700	7.250	0.000	27.050

==== Ribbon ====
Rank	Gymnast	Nation	D Score	A Score	E Score	Pen	Total
1st place, gold medalist(s)	Maria Borisova	(Authorised Neutral Athletes) (AIN2)	13.0	8.100	7.700	0.000	28.800
2nd place, silver medalist(s)	Taisiia Onofriichuk	Ukraine	12.9	7.800	7.750	0.000	28.400
3rd place, bronze medalist(s)	Tara Dragas	Italy	13.2	7.850	7.350	0.050	28.350
4	Yanitsa Dineva	Bulgaria	13.0	7.300	7.400	0.000	27.700
5	Vera Tugolukova	Cyprus	12.1	7.450	7.650	0.050	27.150
6	Darya Viarenich	(Authorised Neutral Athletes) (AIN1)	12.1	7.650	7.400	0.000	27.150
7	Amalia Lica	Romania	12.2	7.000	7.500	0.000	26.700
8	Fanni Pigniczki	Hungary	11.8	7.300	7.300	0.050	26.350

==== Cross battles last 16 round with hoop ====
Gymnast 1	Score	Gymnast 2	Score
Vera Tugolukova	27.700	Polina Karika	27.950
Darya Viarenich	27.550	Anna Kamenshchikova	25.500
Alona Tal Franco	25.900	Andreea Verdes	27.900
Taisiia Onofriichuk	29.800	Emmi Piiroinen	26.800

==== Hoop ====
Rank	Gymnast	Nation	D Score	A Score	E Score	Pen	Total
	Vera Tugolukova	Cyprus	12.500	7.750	7.450		27.700
W	Polina Karika	Ukraine	12.700	7.500	7.750		27.950
W	Darya Viarenich	(Authorised Neutral Athletes) (AIN1)	12.000	7.550	8.000		27.550
	Anna Kamenshchikova	(Authorised Neutral Athletes) (AIN1)	10.600	7.350	7.550		25.500
	Alona Tal Franco	Israel	11.100	7.600	7.200		25.900
W	Andreea Verdes	Romania	12.500	7.600	7.800		27.900
W	Taisiia Onofriichuk	Ukraine	13.900	7.950	7.950		29.800
	Emmi Piiroinen	Finland	11.900	7.300	7.600		26.800

==== Cross battles last 16 round with ball ====
Gymnast 1	Score	Gymnast 2	Score
Arina Kovshova	28.600	Fanni Pigniczki	21.600
Sofia Raffaeli	26.500	Amalia Lica	22.100
Maria Borisova	26.550	Daniela Munits	27.600
Tara Dragas	27.000	Hatice Gokce Emir	26.750

==== Ball ====
Rank	Gymnast	Nation	D Score	A Score	E Score	Pen	Total
W	Arina Kovshova	(Authorised Neutral Athletes) (AIN2)	12.700	7.800	8.100		28.600
	Fanni Pigniczki	Hungary	9.000	6.600	6.300	0.300	21.600
W	Sofia Raffaeli	Italy	11.100	7.850	7.550		26.500
	Amalia Lica	Romania	9.800	6.600	5.700		22.100
	Maria Borisova	(Authorised Neutral Athletes) (AIN2)	11.200	7.650	7.770		26.550
W	Daniela Munits	Israel	12.300	7.600	7.700		27.600
W	Tara Dragas	Italy	11.800	7.750	7.450		27.000
	Hatice Gokce Emir	Turkey	11.700	7.550	7.500		26.750

==== Cross battles last 8 round with ball ====
Gymnast 1	Score	Gymnast 2	Score
Polina Karika	27.100	Darya Viarenich	26.600
Andreea Verdes	24.300	Taisiia Onofriichuk	27.400

==== Ball ====
Rank	Gymnast	Nation	D Score	A Score	E Score	Pen	Total
W	Polina Karika	Ukraine	12.000	7.450	7.650		27.100
	Darya Viarenich	(Authorised Neutral Athletes) (AIN1)	11.100	7.550	7.950		26.600
	Andreea Verdes	Romania	9.800	7.350	7.150		24.300
W	Taisiia Onofriichuk	Ukraine	11.800	7.750	7.850		27.400

==== Cross battles last 8 round with hoop ====
Gymnast 1	Score	Gymnast 2	Score
Arina Kovshova	29.050	Sofia Raffaeli	29.500
Daniela Munits	28.450	Tara Dragas	25.350

==== Hoop ====
Rank	Gymnast	Nation	D Score	A Score	E Score	Pen	Total
	Arina Kovshova	(Authorised Neutral Athletes) (AIN2)	13.200	7.750	8.100		29.050
W	Sofia Raffaeli	Italy	13.800	8.000	7.700		29.500
W	Daniela Munits	Israel	12.900	7.600	7.950		28.450
	Tara Dragas	Italy	11.300	7.350	6.700		25.350

==== Cross battles last 4 round with clubs ====
Gymnast 1	Score	Gymnast 2	Score
Polina Karika	25.950	Taisiia Onofriichuk	29.300
Sofia Raffaeli	25.500	Daniela Munits	29.400

Clubs

Rank	Gymnast	Nation	D Score	A Score	E Score	Pen	Total
	Polina Karika	Ukraine	11.700	7.350	6.900		25.950
W	Taisiia Onofriichuk	Ukraine	13.700	7.900	7.700		29.300
	Sofia Raffaeli	Italy	11.200	7.500	6.800		25.500
W	Daniela Munits	Israel	13.700	7.700	8.000		29.400

==== Cross battle bronze medal round with ribbon ====
Gymnast 1	Score	Gymnast 2	Score
Polina Karika	25.400	Sofia Raffaeli	26.500

Ribbon

Rank	Gymnast	Nation	D Score	A Score	E Score	Pen	Total
3rd place, bronze medalist(s)	Sofia Raffaeli	Italy	11.100	7.900	7.500		26.500
4	Polina Karika	Ukraine	10.900	7.300	7.200		25.400

==== Cross battle gold medal round with ribbon ====
Gymnast 1	Score	Gymnast 2	Score
Taisiia Onofriichuk	27.000	Daniela Munits	27.550

Ribbon

Rank	Gymnast	Nation	D Score	A Score	E Score	Pen	Total
1st place, gold medalist(s)	Daniela Munits	Israel	12.100	7.700	7.750		27.550
2nd place, silver medalist(s)	Taisiia Onofriichuk	Ukraine	11.900	7.700	7.400		27.000

=== Juniors ===
==== Team Cross Battle ====
Rank	Nation	Total
1st place, gold medalist(s)	(Authorised Neutral Athletes) (AIN2)	103.100
2nd place, silver medalist(s)	Bulgaria	98.900
3rd place, bronze medalist(s)	(Authorised Neutral Athletes) (AIN1)	96.900
4	Ukraine	96.650
5	Israel	96.300
6	Turkey	94.800
7	Georgia	94.700
8	Azerbaijan	93.950

==== Hoop ====
Rank	Gymnast	D Score	A Score	E Score	Pen	Total
1st place, gold medalist(s)	(Authorised Neutral Athletes) Kseniia Savinova (AIN2)	9.800	7.550	8.050		25.400
2nd place, silver medalist(s)	(Romania) Patricia Stanciu	10.300	7.500	7.350		25.150
3rd place, bronze medalist(s)	(Ukraine) Sofiia Kulikova	9.800	7.500	7.700		25.000
4	(Turkey) Ada Kaplan	9.700	7.600	7.650		24.950
5	(Authorised Neutral Athletes) Kseniya Bandarenka (AIN1)	9.200	7.650	7.900		24.750
6	(Poland) Laura Lewinska	9.500	7.450	7.500	0.050	24.400
7	(Azerbaijan) Azada Atakishiyeva	9.000	7.350	7.800		24.150
8	(Israel) Rebekka Miller	9.600	7.300	7.200	0.350	23.750

==== Ball ====
Rank	Gymnast	D Score	A Score	E Score	Pen	Total
1st place, gold medalist(s)	(Authorised Neutral Athletes) Kseniia Savinova (AIN2)	10.200	7.750	7.950	0.050	25.850
2nd place, silver medalist(s)	(Bulgaria) Alexandra Petrova	10.000	7.650	7.400	0.100	24.950
3rd place, bronze medalist(s)	(Uzbekistan) Sabina Kagirova	9.400	7.550	7.900	0.050	24.800
4	(Azerbaijan) Azada Atakishiyeva	9.200	7.550	7.700		24.450
5	(Georgia (country)) Nita Jamagidze	9.200	7.450	7.750		24.400
6	(Authorised Neutral Athletes) Kira Babkevich (AIN1)	9.100	7.450	7.600		24.150
7	(Israel) Alice Rozenberg	8.900	7.600	7.650	0.050	24.100
8	(Poland) Laura Lewinska	8.500	7.700	7.800	0.050	29.950

==== Clubs ====
Rank	Gymnast	D Score	A Score	E Score	Pen	Total
1st place, gold medalist(s)	(Georgia (country)) Nita Jamagidze	10.300	7.950	7.950		26.200
2nd place, silver medalist(s)	(Authorised Neutral Athletes) Iana Zaikina (AIN2)	10.000	7.450	8.100		25.550
3rd place, bronze medalist(s)	(Ukraine) Sofiia Krainska	10.200	7.650	7.700	0.300	25.250
4	(Authorised Neutral Athletes) Kira Babkevich (AIN1)	9.700	7.550	7.850		25.100
5	(Bulgaria) Dea Emilova	9.800	7.700	7.450	0.05	24.900
6	(Turkey) Selen Camci	9.200	7.400	7.650		24.250
7	(Estonia) Alexandra Ivahnenko	9.400	7.250	7.550		24.200
8	(Israel) Rebekka Miller	8.800	7.550	7.550		23.900

==== Ribbon ====
Rank	Gymnast	D Score	A Score	E Score	Pen	Total
1st place, gold medalist(s)	(Authorised Neutral Athletes) Iana Zaikina (AIN2)	10.600	7.800	8.00	0.100	26.300
2nd place, silver medalist(s)	(Bulgaria) Dea Emilova	10.200	7.550	8.000		25.750
3rd place, bronze medalist(s)	(Israel) Alice Rozenberg	9.300	7.500	7.750		24.550
4	(Greece) Aikaterini Pavlou	9.200	7.400	7.700		24.300
5	(Estonia) Alexandra Ivahnenko	9.200	7.350	7.700		24.250
6	(Ukraine) Varvara Chubarova	8.700	7.250	7.450		23.400
7	(Turkey) Ada Kaplan	8.200	7.300	7.600		23.100
8	(Authorised Neutral Athletes) Margarita Zhurovich (AIN1)	8.500	7.800	6.900	0.300	22.900

==== Team Cross Battle ====
===== Cross battles last 8 round with hoop and ball =====
Nation 1	Score	Nation 2	Score
Authorised Neutral Athletes (AIN 2)	52.200	Azerbaijan	49.150
Authorised Neutral Athletes (AIN 1)	49.250	Turkey	48.650
Israel	51.400	Ukraine	48.750
Georgia	42.500	Bulgaria	52.200

Hoop

Rank	Gymnast	D Score	A Score	E Score	Pen	Total
1	(Authorised Neutral Athletes) Kseniia Savinova (AIN2)	11.100	7.950	7.950		27.000
2	(Bulgaria) Siyana Alekova	11.100	7.500	7.700		26.300
3	(Israel) Rebekka Miller	10.700	7.600	7.800		26.100
4	(Azerbaijan) Azada Atakishiyeva	9.700	7.600	7.700		25.000
5	(Ukraine) Sofiia Kulikova	9.800	7.300	7.500		24.600
6	(Turkey) Ada Kaplan	9.800	7.300	7.300		24.400
7	(Authorised Neutral Athletes) Kseniya Bandarenka (AIN1)	8.500	7.650	7.600		23.750
8	(Georgia (country)) Elene Bakradze	7.400	6.550	6.000	0.900	19.050

Ball

Rank	Gymnast	D Score	A Score	E Score	Pen	Total
1	(Bulgaria) Alexandra Petrova	10.200	7.800	7.900		25.900
2	(Authorised Neutral Athletes) Kira Babkevich (AIN1)	9.700	7.800	8.000		25.500
3	(Israel) Alice Rozenberg	9.600	7.850	7.850		25.300
4	(Authorised Neutral Athletes) Kseniia Savinova (AIN2)	10.200	7.500	7.500		25.200
5	(Turkey) Selen Camci	9.400	7.500	7.350		24.250
6	(Azerbaijan) Azada Atakishiyeva	9.100	7.500	7.550		24.150
7	(Ukraine) Sofiia Krainska	9.200	7.550	7.400		24.150
8	(Georgia (country)) Nita Jamagidze	8.500	7.600	7.350		23.450

Cross battles last 4 round with clubs

Nation 1	Score	Nation 2	Score
Authorised Neutral Athletes (AIN 2)	26.000	Authorised Neutral Athletes (AIN 1)	24.650
Israel	23.550	Bulgaria	24.300

Clubs

Rank	Gymnast	D Score	A Score	E Score	Pen	Total
1	(Authorised Neutral Athletes) Iana Zaikina (AIN2)	10.100	7.800	8.100		26.000
2	(Authorised Neutral Athletes) Kira Babkevich (AIN1)	9.400	7.650	7.600		24.650
3	(Bulgaria) Dea Emilova	9.400	7.450	7.450		24.300
4	(Israel) Rebekka Miller	9.400	7.350	6.800		23.550

Cross battles bronze medal round with ribbon

Nation 1	Score	Nation 2	Score
Authorised Neutral Athletes (AIN 1)	22.600	Israel	24.800

Ribbon

Rank	Gymnast	D Score	A Score	E Score	Pen	Total
3rd place, bronze medalist(s)	(Israel) Alice Rozenberg	9.400	7.750	7.650		24.800
4	(Authorised Neutral Athletes) Margarita Zhurovich (AIN1)	8.000	7.600	7.000		22.600

===== RCross battles gold medal round with ribbon =====
Nation 1	Score	Nation 2	Score
Authorised Neutral Athletes (AIN 2)	25.450	Bulgaria	22.600

Ribbon

Rank	Gymnast	D Score	A Score	E Score	Pen	Total
1st place, gold medalist(s)	(Authorised Neutral Athletes) Iana Zaikina (AIN2)	9.700	8.000	7.900	0.150	25.450
2nd place, silver medalist(s)	(Bulgaria) Dea Emilova	8.500	7.300	6.800		22.600

== Medal table ==
=== Combined ===
* Host nation (Azerbaijan)

Rank	Nation	Gold	Silver	Bronze	Total
1	Authorised Neutral Athletes (ANA)	7	5	2	14
2	Israel (ISR)	3	1	2	6
3	Bulgaria (BUL)	1	3	0	4
4	Ukraine (UKR)	1	2	3	6
5	Georgia (GEO)	1	0	0	1
6	Italy (ITA)	0	1	4	5
7	Romania (ROU)	0	1	0	1
8	Uzbekistan (UZB)	0	0	1	1
Totals (8 entries)		13	13	12	38
