= Darya Viarenich =

Belarusian rhythmic gymnast

- Full name: Daria Verenich
- Born: September 18, 2006 (age 19) Gomel, Belarus

Gymnastics career
- Discipline: Rhythmic gymnastics
- Country represented: Belarus; Authorised Neutral Athletes (since 2024) (2024–present)
- Gym: Republican Olympic Training Center
- Head coach: Irina Leparskaya
- Assistant coach: Larisa Lukyanenko
- Former coach: Victoria Viktorovna Vnuchkina
Medal record
Representing Authorised Neutral Athletes
Rhythmic Gymnastics
European Cup
Silver medal – second place	2026 Baku	Clubs
Bronze medal – third place	2026 Baku	Hoop

Darya Viarenich (Belarusian: Дар'я Веренич; born 18 September 2006) is a Belarusian rhythmic gymnast. On national level, she is the 2021 Junior all-around champion.

== Personal life ==
She studies at the Belarusian State University of Physical Culture to become a rhythmic gymnastics coach.

== Career ==
She began rhythmic gymnastics at the age of 8 after her mother insisted she be accepted into a gymnastics like her older sister, despite coaches initially suggesting she try acrobatics or trampoline instead. She trained under coach Victoria Viktorovna Vnuchkina in Gomel, Belarus.

In 2020, at age 14, Verenich moved to Minsk to train at the Republican State School of Olympic Reserve, under coaches Irina Leparskaya and Yulia Bichun-Komarova. A year later, she became national all-around champion in junior category.

=== Senior ===
In 2024, Darya won gold medals in ball, clubs and ribbon at Bosphorus Cup in Istanbul, Turkey. Later in June, she won bronze medal in team competition at the 2024 BRICS Games in Kazan, Russia.

In 2025, Darya made her World Cup debut competing under neutral flag at Tashkent World Cup. She took 15th place in all-around and qualified to hoop final, where she ended on 5th place. In July that year, she competed at Milan World Cup, finishing on 22nd place in all-around.

In 2026, she won gold medal in all-around at Gymnastik International in Fellbach Schmiden, Germany. She competed at Sofia World Cup, where she took 33rd place in all-around. On April 10-12, she competed at Tashkent World Cup and took 27th place in all-around. In May, she competed at European Cup in Baku and won silver medal in clubs and bronze in hoop.

== Routine music information ==
Year	Apparatus	Music title
2026
2026	Hoop	ONLY HOPE A by Yaniv Barmeli
2026	Ball	Trececerotres by Daniela Lalita / Angst by Power-Haus feat. Christian Reindl
2026	Clubs	Un Due Tre Amen! by Faraualla
2026	Ribbon	Speed Mongolia by Mathias Duplessy
2025
2025	Hoop	Nagashi (from Jigoku Shoujo)
2025	Ball	Por Una Cabeza by Sumi Jo
2025	Clubs	Un Due Tre Amen! by Faraualla
2025	Ribbon	Shik Shak Shok by Yasar Akpence
