= Arina Kovshova =

Russian rhythmic gymnast

- Full name: Arina Andreevna Kovshova
- Nickname: Arisha
- Born: 3 September 2009 (age 17) Novosibirsk, Russia

Gymnastics career
- Discipline: Rhythmic gymnastics
- Country represented: Russia Authorised Neutral Athletes (2026-present)
- Club: Sky Grace
- Head coaches: Tatiana Sergaeva, Alina Kabaeva
- Assistant coaches: Elizaveta Chernova, Evgeniya Kanaeva, Anna Gudzinskaya
- Choreographer: Elena Egorova
Medal record
Representing Russia and Authorized Neutral Athletes
Rhythmic Gymnastics
Event	1st	2nd	3rd
FIG World Challenge Cup	1	0	1
FIG World Cup	0	1	0
Total	1	1	1
European Cup
Gold medal – first place	2026 Baku	Ball
Silver medal – second place	2026 Baku	Hoop

Arina Andreevna Kovshova (Russian: Арина Андреевна Ковшова; born 3 September 2009) is a Russian individual rhythmic gymnast. On the national level, she is the 2026 Russian all-around champion.

== Career ==
=== Junior ===
In April 2024, she received the title of Master of Sports of Russia. In June that year, she competed at the BRICS Games in Kazan, and won a silver medal in the all-around among juniors.

=== Senior ===
In 2025, she started competing as a senior. She took 7th place in all-around at Russian Championships. In March, she received neutral status from the International Gymnastics Federation for participation in FIG tournaments.

In early 2026, she moved to Sochi to train at Sky Grace academy. Soon after, she won gold medal in all-around at Russian Championships. She also won gold medal in ball and silver in clubs final. In March, she made her international debut at Sofia World Cup, where she took 7th place in all-around. She was 4th in ball and 7th in clubs final. On April 17-19, she competed at Baku World Cup and took 15th place in all-around. In May, she competed at European Cup in Baku and won gold medal in ball and silver in hoop. On June 19-21, Arina competed at Beijing World Challenge Cup, and took 6th place in all-around. She won gold medal in hoop and bronze in ball final. She was selected to compete at the 2026 World Championships in Frankfurt, Germany, but had to withdraw due to an injury.

== Competitive highlights ==
Year	Event	Team	AA	Hoop	Ball	Clubs	Ribb.
National
2026	Russian Championships		1st				

== Routine music information ==
Year	Apparatus	Music Title
2026	Hoop	The Matrix (Main Theme) by Massed Bands of Her Majesty's Royal Marines
2026	Ball	Spiegel im Spiegel by Matthew Denton & Thomas Hewitt Jones / November by Mari Samuelsen, Konzerthausorchester Berlin & Jonathan Stockhammer
2026	Clubs	Aroul by Taalbi Brothers
2026	Ribbon	Время, вперед! by Vladimir Fedoseyev & Bolshoi Symphonic Orchestra
2025	Hoop	Piano Concerto in A Minor, Op. 16: III. Allegro moderato molto e marcato
2025	Ball	Spiegel im Spiegel by Matthew Denton & Thomas Hewitt Jones / November by Mari Samuelsen, Konzerthausorchester Berlin & Jonathan Stockhammer
2025	Clubs	Aroul by Taalbi Brothers
2025	Ribbon (first)	Danse macabre Op. 40 by Orchestre du Capitole de Toulouse/Michel Plasson
2025	Ribbon (second)	Starvation by Thomas Bergersen
