= Hatice Gokce Emir =

Turkish rhythmic gymnast (born 2008)

Hatice Gökçe Emir
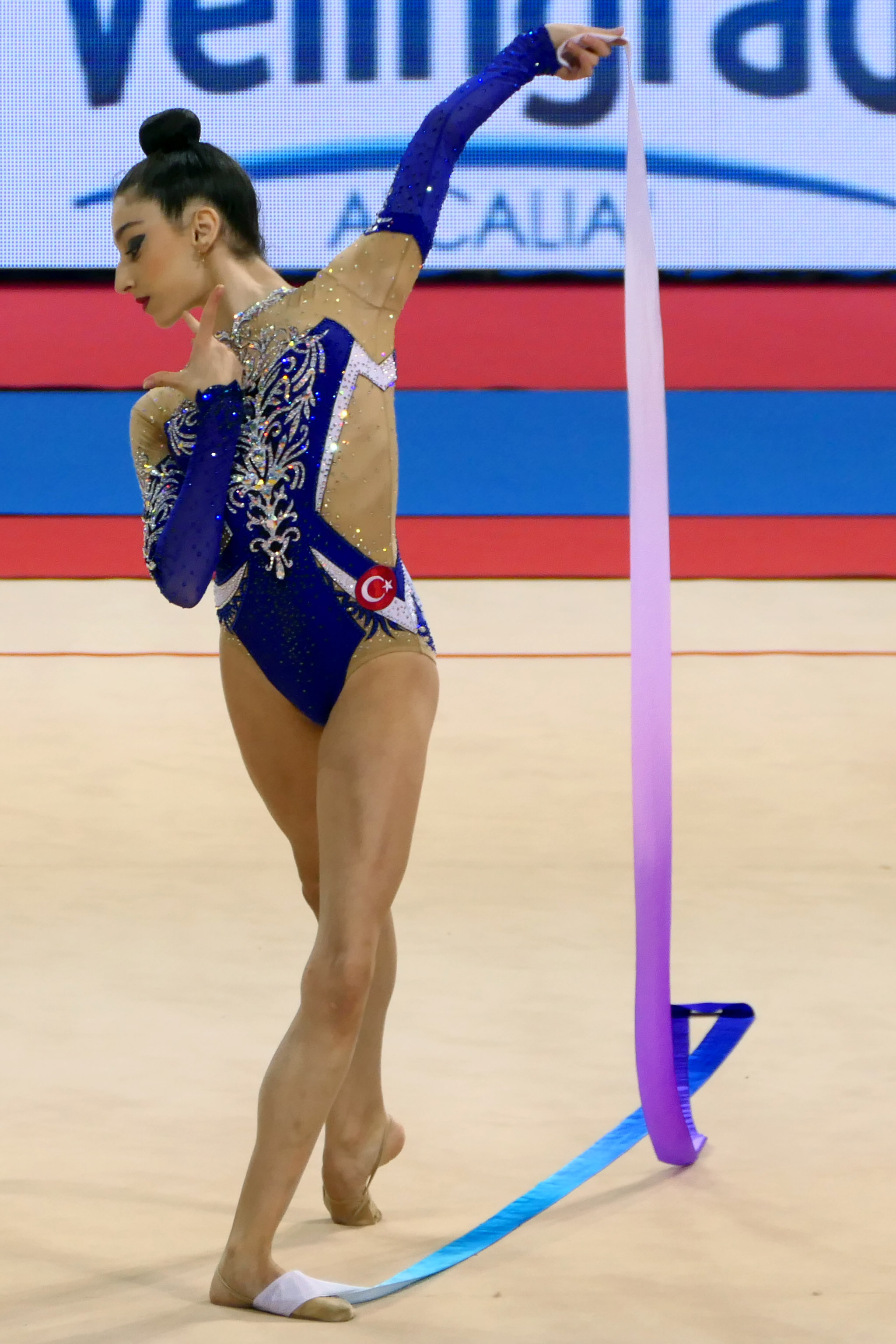
- Emir at the 2024 Sofia World Cup

Personal information
- Born: 24 May 2008 (age 18) Pendik, Istanbul, Turkey

Gymnastics career
- Discipline: Rhythmic gymnastics
- Country represented: Turkey (2022-)
- Club: Şavkar İstanbul Sports club
- Head coach: Viktoriya Ozar-Sorvina
- Choreographer: Valentina Ivanova
Medal record
Rhythmic Gymnastics
Representing Turkey
| Event | 1st | 2nd | 3rd |
|---|---|---|---|
| FIG World Challenge Cup | 0 | 1 | 0 |
| Total | 0 | 1 | 0 |
Mediterranean Games
| Gold medal – first place | 2026 Taranto | All-around |

Hatice Gökçe Emir (born 24 May 2008) is a Turkish individual rhythmic gymnast. She is a two-time (2022, 2023) Turkish National all-around champion in the Junior category.

== Career ==
She began practicing rhythmic gymnastics at the age of 4.

=== Junior ===
In 2021, she debuted in major competitions at the Irina Deleanu Cup in Bucharest in May. She placed 35th in the all-around.

Emir was selected for the 2022 Junior European Championship in Tel Aviv, Israel, together with her teammates Defne Eylul Kilic and Deniz Oskay. She competed with hoop and ball. They took 16th place in the Team event. In June, she competed at the 2022 COMEGYM Mediterranean Junior Championships in Mersin. She won gold medal in ball final.

The following year, she won gold medal in all-around at Turkish National Championships. In July, she competed at the Junior World Championships in Cluj-Napoca alongside the junior national group. They took 13th place in the Team competition. Her best result was with ribbon, where she ranked 15th in the qualification round.

=== Senior ===
==== 2024 ====
In 2024, she started competing as a senior. In March, she competed at Gymnastik International and won silver medal in hoop final. She was 5th in ball and 6th in clubs final. She competed at Sofia World Cup and ended on 39th place in All-around. She represented Turkey at the 2024 European Championships in Budapest, Hungary and qualified to the All-around final, where she took 20th place behind Israeli Daria Atamanov. She is the first Turkish rhythmic gymnast to reach the All-around final since Kamelya Tuncel in 2020.

==== 2025 ====
In 2025, on March 7–9, she competed at International Tournament Bosphorus Cup in Istanbul, Turkey and won gold medal in All-around, in front of Andreea Verdes and Nina Dragović. She also won gold in Team competition with Deniz Oskay. On 4–6 April, she competed at 2025 World Cup Sofia and took 15th place in the all-around and did not advance into apparatus finals. On April 18–20, she competed at the Baku World Cup and finished on 12th place in all-around. She qualified to her first World Cup apparatus final (hoop) and took 6th place. In June, Hatice represented Turkey at the 2025 European Championships in Tallinn. She took 13th place in all-around final. In July, she competed at the Milan World Cup, where she took 23th place in the all-around and 5th place in hoop final.

In August, she was selected to represent Turkey at the 2025 World Championships in Rio de Janeiro, Brazil, her first World Championships. She qualified to hoop final, becoming the first Turkish rhythmic gymnast to do so. She took 18th place in all-around qualifications, making history again, becoming the first Turkish rhythmic gymnast to qualify to individual all-around final at World Championships, finishing on 14th place.

==== 2026 ====
In 2026, she started the season competing at World Cup Sofia, where she finished on 23rd place in all-around. Later, she competed at World Cup Tashkent and took 22nd place in all-around. She also qualified to ribbon final, finishing 5th. On 17-19 April, she was 18th in the all-around at the Baku World Cup and did not qualify to any apparatus finals. She competed at European Cup in Baku. She was 8th in hoop and clubs finals. In Cross battle event she lost against Tara Dragas. On May 15-17, she competed at World Challenge Cup in Portimão, and took 14th place in all-around. She won silver medal in hoop final behind Sofia Raffaeli, and became the first Turkish rhythmic gymnast to win a medal at World Cup event. In the end of May she represented Turkey at the 2026 European Championships in Varna, Bulgaria. She was 23rd in all-around qualifications, and did not advance into all-around final.

In August, she represented Turkey at the 2026 World Championships in Frankfurt, Germany. She took 35th place in all-around qualifications and did not advance into all-around final. On August 25-26, she competed at the 2026 Mediterranean Games in Taranto, Italy, and won historic gold medal in all-around final in front of Daniela Picó and Viola Sella.

== Achievements ==
- First Turkish rhythmic gymnast to qualify to apparatus final (hoop) at the World Championship.
- First Turkish rhythmic gymnast to qualify to all-around final at the World Championship.
- She holds the best Turkish individual all-around finish in a World Championship (14th place in 2025).
- First Turkish rhythmic gymnast to win a medal (silver) in an event final at the World Cup.
- First Turkish rhythmic gymnast to win a medal (gold) in all-around final at the Mediterranean Games.

== Routine music information ==
| Year | Apparatus | Music title |
|---|---|---|
| 2026 | Hoop | |
| 2026 | Ball | Predator Instinct by Sarah Schachner |
| 2026 | Clubs | Tit For Tat by Power-Haus, Joni Fuller |
| 2026 | Ribbon | Breathe by The Stickmen Project |
| 2025 | Hoop | The Duchess' Secret by Davis Withane |
| 2025 | Ball | The Joker (music from The Motion Picture) by Joaquin Phoenix |
| 2025 | Clubs | Tit For Tat by Power-Haus, Joni Fuller |
| 2025 | Ribbon | Cleopatra by Efendi |
| 2024 | Hoop | The Duchess' Secret by Davis Withane |
| 2024 | Ball | Libertango by Layers Classic |
| 2024 | Clubs | Spirits by Chronis Taxidis |
| 2024 | Ribbon | Arno's Waltz by Joshua Kyan Aalampour |
| 2023 | Hoop | Ode to Joy by Imagine Music |
| 2023 | Ball | Libertango by Layers Classic |
| 2023 | Clubs | unknown |
| 2023 | Ribbon | Irna / Valsapena from Cirque du Soleil discography by Alegría |
