= Sofia Ilteriakova =

Russian rhythmic gymnast

- София Ильтерякова
- Full name: Sofia Alekseevna Ilteriakova
- Alternative name: Sofiia Ilteriakova
- Nickname: Sonya
- Born: 7 August 2010 (age 16) Ufa, Bashkortostan, Russia

Gymnastics career
- Discipline: Rhythmic gymnastics
- Country represented: Authorised Neutral Athletes (2026) Russia; (2021-present)
- Head coach: Tatiana Sergaeva
- Assistant coach: Natalia Glemba
- Choreographer: Ekaterina Sergeeva
Medal record
Representing Russia and Authorised Neutral Athletes
Rhythmic Gymnastics
Event	1st	2nd	3rd
World Championships	1	1	0
European Championships	1	0	2
FIG World Cup	0	2	1
FIG World Challenge Cup	3	1	1
Total	5	4	4
World Championships
Gold medal – first place	2026 Frankfurt	Team
Silver medal – second place	2026 Frankfurt	Ball
European Championships
Gold medal – first place	2026 Varna	Hoop
Bronze medal – third place	2026 Varna	Team
Bronze medal – third place	2026 Varna	Ball

Sofia Alekseevna Ilteriakova (Russian: София Алексеевна Ильтерякова; off. sp.: Sofiia Ilteriakova; born 7 August 2010) is a Russian individual rhythmic gymnast.

On the national level, she is the 2026 Russian national all-around silver medalist. On the junior level, she is the 2025 national all-around, hoop and ball champion.

== Career ==
Ilteriakova took up rhythmic gymnastics at the age of 6 and a half. As of 2026, she trains in Moscow under Natalia Glemba and Ekaterina Sergeeva.

=== Junior ===
In June 2024, she competed at the BRICS Games and won the gold medal in the junior ball final.

In the spring of 2025, she won the gold medals in the all-around and the hoop and ball finals at the Russian junior championships.

=== Senior ===
==== 2026 ====
She debuted as a senior in early 2026 at the Moscow championships, winning the all-around gold. In late February – early March 2026, she competed at the Russian championships and won the silver medal in the all-around. In late March, she made her international debut at the World Cup event in Sofia, Bulgaria. She won the silver medal in the hoop final with a score of 29.700, behind Ukrainian Taisia Onofriichuk with 30.400 and ahead of Italian Sofia Raffaeli with 29.600. After the competition, she faced controversy for not turning to face the flags shown on the electronic screen behind the podium during the medal ceremony. The Ukrainian Gymnastics Federation demanded her results be annulled and that she be banned from international competitions for "disrespect for the state symbol of [their] country".

This prompted a review by the International Gymnastics Federation (FIG). Having assessed the incident, the FIG Ad-Hoc Committee decided to issue a warning to her, stating that "AIN Athletes bear full responsibility to avoid any action that could be perceived as disrespectful or politically motivated". Additionally, the FIG warned that "any similar violation of its rules for award ceremonies, or other breach of the Ad-hoc regulations, would result in the withdrawal of her AIN status". The FIG also noted the "need to clarify the protocol governing [their] award ceremonies". Russian athlete and deputy at the State Duma Svetlana Zhurova approved the federation's decision "not to ruin the child's career" and pointed out that "it was noticeable that [Ilteriakova] was standing there on the podium a bit lost and didn't know what she was supposed to do and how." The head coach of the Russian rhythmic gymnastics team, Tatiana Sergaeva, suggested as well that "Sofia might have become a little confused", which was "completely natural for an athlete [...] competing at [the high international] level for the first time."

On 17–19 April, she competed at the Baku World Cup, where she ended in 5th place in the all-around. She also won bronze in the hoop final, took 8th place in the ball final, and won bronze in the clubs final. On May 16, the Executive Committee has decided to lift all restrictions regarding the participation of Russian and Belarusian gymnasts since 2022. Therefore, she and her teammates were able to represent Russia.

Ilteriakova made her European Championship debut in May at the 42nd European Championships in Varna, Bulgaria. She qualified in fifth place with a total score of 85.500. In the individual all-around final, she finished in fifth place ahead of teammate Maria Borisova with a total score of 115.050. She and her teammates won the bronze medal in team competition behind Bulgaria and Israel. In the apparatus finals, she became European champion with the hoop ahead of Alina Harnasko and Sofia Rafaelli. In the ball final, she won the bronze medal. On 19–21 June, Ilteriakova competed at the Beijing World Challenge Cup and took the silver medal in the all-around behind Wang Qi. She won gold medals in ball, clubs and ribbon and a bronze medal in the hoop final.

In August, Ilteriakova competed at the 2026 Rhythmic Gymnastics World Championships in Frankfurt, Germany. She finished 12th in the individual all-around with a score of 113.150 and won the silver medal in the ball final with 29.800. She took 6th place in clubs and 4th place in ribbon final. She also won the gold medal in team competition alongside senior group and Maria Borisova.

In October, she competed at International tournament Aura Cup in Croatia and won five gold medals (all-around, hoop, ball, clubs, ribbon). Later in the year, she competed at the Aeon Cup in Tokyo, with her teammates Mariia Borisova and Yana Zaikina. They represented the Sky Grace, which won the gold medal in front of Burlo/Pacific club and Deriugina school. In the senior all-around, Ilteriakova won a gold medal in front of Borisova and Megan Chu. In November, she competed with club ASU Udinese and won the gold medal in the Italian Serie A1 club championship.

== Competitive highlights ==
Year	Event	Team	AA	Hoop	Ball	Clubs	Ribb.
International
2026	European Championships	3rd	5th	1st	3rd		4th
2026	World Championships	1st	12th		2nd	6th	4th
2026	Aeon Cup	1st	1st				
National
2026	Russian Championships		2nd				

== Routine music information ==
Year	Apparatus	Music Title
2027	Hoop	Concerto Gorsso No.1: I. Preludio by Lev Markiz, New Stockholm Chamber Orchestra
2027	Ball	
2027	Clubs	
2027	Ribbon	
2026	Hoop	Pe..Pe..Pepein by Neeraj Sridhar, Saleem Shehzada, Tulsi Kumar / Raftaarein by Shahrukh Khan, Kareena Kapoor
2026	Ball (first)	Stomp and Claps by Action Alexi / Come & Get it by Klayton / Vogue by Madonna
2026	Ball (second)	Stomp and Claps by Action Alexi / Come & Get it by Klayton / WOULD YOU RUN by TRI.BE
2026	Clubs	The Game is Afoot by Eternal Eclipse
2026	Ribbon	Elephant by Cut Capers
2025	Hoop	Pe..Pe..Pepein by Neeraj Sridhar, Saleem Shehzada, Tulsi Kumar / Raftaarein by Shahrukh Khan, Kareena Kapoor
2025	Ball	A Eso Vine by Salvy y Yuly, Kiliki Taka Ti by Toño Rosario, Jumping by Armando & Heidy
2025	Clubs	The Game is Afoot by Eternal Eclipse
2025	Ribbon	Hound Dog by Tonya Graves
2024	Hoop	B Minor by Leahy
2024	Ball	Pump Up the Jam by The Lost Fingers
2024	Clubs	Sabre Dance by Leonard Slatkin & National Philharmonic Orchestra
2024	Ribbon	Bajo el Mismo Sol Alvaro Soler
