= Ksenia Savinova =

Russian rhythmic gymnast

- Full name: Russian: Ксения Андреевна Савинова
- Alternative name: Kseniia Savinova
- Born: 29 August 2011 (age 15) Gatchina, Leningrad Oblast, Russia

Gymnastics career
- Discipline: Rhythmic gymnastics
- Country represented: Russia; (2025-)
Medal record
Representing Russia and Authorised Neutral Athletes
Junior European Championships
Silver medal – second place	2026 Varna	Hoop
European Cup
Gold medal – first place	2026 Baku	Team
Gold medal – first place	2026 Baku	Hoop
Gold medal – first place	2026 Baku	Ball

Ksenia Andreevna Savinova (Russian: Ксения Андреевна Савинова; off. sp.: Kseniia Savinova; born 29 August 2011) is a Russian individual rhythmic gymnast.

She is the 2025 AEON Cup silver medalist in the club competition and gold medalist in the individual junior division. Moreover, on the junior level, she is a 2024 national silver medalist, a 2025 national silver and bronze medalist, the 2026 national all-around, ribbon, ball, clubs, and hoop gold medallist, and the 2026 European hoop silver medalist.

== Career ==
Savinova was born in Gatchina, Leningrad Oblast, on 29 August 2011 and took up rhythmic gymnastics at the age of three. In 2023, she moved to Sochi to train at the Sky Grace academy.

=== Junior ===
In the spring of 2025, she won two medals, a silver and a bronze, at the Russian junior championships. In the autumn, she competed at the AEON Cup in Tokyo, Japan, winning the silver medal in the club competition and the gold medal in the individual junior division.

In 2026, she won the gold medals in the all-around and all the four apparatus finals at the Russian junior championships. In late April, she competed in the junior division of the 2026 Rhythmic Gymnastics European Cup in Baku, Azerbaijan, winning team and two individual golds, in hoop and ball. In late May, she competed at the European championships in Varna, Bulgaria, and won the silver medal in the junior hoop final. In October, she competed at the International tournament Aura Cup in Croatia and took 4th place in all-around. She won gold medal hoop final.

== Competitive highlights ==
Year	Event	Team	AA	Hoop	Ball	Clubs	Ribb.
International
2025	Aeon Cup	2nd	1st J				
International junior
2026	European Championships			2nd			
National
2026	Russian Junior Championships		1st	1st	1st	1st	1st
