= Siyana Alekova =

Bulgarian rhythmic gymnast (born 2011)

- Full name: Siyana Yanulavova Alekova
- Alternative name: Сияна Алекова
- Nickname: Sisi
- Born: 25 July 2011 (age 15) Sofia, Bulgaria

Gymnastics career
- Discipline: Rhythmic gymnastics
- Country represented: Bulgaria; (2025-)
- Club: Sofia Sport RG
- Head coach: Kristina Shikerova
Medal record
Representing Bulgaria
Rhythmic gymnastics
Junior European Championships
Gold medal – first place	2026 Varna	Team
Gold medal – first place	2026 Varna	Hoop
European Cup
Silver medal – second place	2026 Baku	Team

Siyana Alekova (Bulgarian: Сияна Алекова; born 25 July 2011) is a Bulgarian rhythmic gymnast. She represents Bulgaria in international competitions.

== Personal life ==
Her mother, Kristina Shikerova, is a retired Bulgarian rhythmic gymnast that won medals at the 1991 World Championships. She currently owns a rhythmic gymnastics club "Sofia Sport", where Siyana is training.

== Career ==
=== Junior ===
In 2025, Siyana won gold medal in ribbon at International tournament Pharaoh's Cup in Cairo. In May, she won silver medal in ribbon final at Bulgarian National Championships. She competed at Gymnastika Solo Cup in Dubai and won silver medal in all-around, hoop, clubs and ribbon.

In 2026, Siyana started the season competing at Miss Valentine International tournament and won gold medal in team competition with Dea Emilova. She also won gold medal in ribbon final and took 4th place in hoop. In April, she won gold medals in hoop and team competition at International tournament Sofia Cup. In May, she took part in European Cup in Baku, Azerbaijan. Together with her teammates Dea Emilova and Aleksandra Petrova she won silver medal in team competition. She also took 13th place in hoop. She was selected to represent Bulgaria alongside Dea Emilova and Aleksandra Petrova at 2026 European Championships in Varna, Bulgaria. They won gold medal in team competition. Siyana also won gold medal in hoop final. In October, she competed in the second round of the Italian Serie A with club Ritmica Opera Roma and took 11th place.

== Routine music information ==
Year	Apparatus	Music title
2027	Hoop	The Storm by HAVASI
2027	Ball	
2027	Clubs	
2027	Ribbon	
