= Alina Ermolova =

Russian gymnast

- Full name: Alina Alekseevna Ermolova
- Alternative name: Alina Yermolova
- Nickname: Alinochka
- Born: February 27, 2001 (age 25) Shakhty, Rostov Oblast, Russia

Gymnastics career
- Discipline: Rhythmic gymnastics
- Country represented: Russia; (2012-)
- Club: Gazprom
- Gym: Novogorsk
- Head coach: Irina Viner
- Assistant coach: Elena Karpushenko
- Choreographer: Elena Karpushenko
- Retired: yes
Medal record
Junior European Championships
| Gold medal – first place | 2016 Holon | Rope |
| Gold medal – first place | 2016 Holon | Team |

Alina Alekseevna Ermolova (Russian: Алина Алексеевна Ермолова, born February 27, 2001, in Shakhty) is a Russian individual rhythmic gymnast. She is the 2016 European Junior Rope champion and two-time (2015, 2016) Russian Junior national all-around champion.

== Career ==
=== Junior ===
Ermolova was coached by Elena Karpushenko, who also coached World champion and record holder Yana Kudryavtseva. Ermolova appeared in international tournaments in 2014, she competed as HC at the Minsk Junior World Cup and at the Russian Youth championships. She won the all-around bronze at the 2014 Russian Junior Championships.

In 2015, Ermolova started her season at the 2015 Moscow Grand Prix winning the all-around gold. She took team gold with Ekaterina Ayupova at the 2015 Lisboa Junior World Cup. In her next event, at the 2015 Holon Grand Prix, she won the all-around gold with a total of 66.834 points. Ermolova also won her first 2015 Russian Junior All-around title held in Kazan. Ermolova won the all-around gold at the 2015 Sofia Junior World Cup, 2015 Budapest Junior World Cup and at the 2015 Junior World Cup Final in Kazan. In October 2–4, Ermolova together with senior teammates Margarita Mamun and Aleksandra Soldatova represented Team Gazprom at the 2015 Aeon Cup in Tokyo Japan, Ermolova won the junior individual all-around title (Rope:16.733, Hoop:16.716, Ball:16.683, Clubs:16.766) with a total of 66.898 and with Team Russia winning the gold medal in the overall standings.

In 2016, Ermolova started the season winning team gold 2016 Moscow Junior Grand Prix, she qualified to 3 apparatus finals: winning gold in hoop and silver in rope, clubs. She then won the all-around gold at Happy Caravan Junior World Cup in Tashkent. She then won the Russian Junior National Championships ahead of Polina Shmatko. Ermolova won Team gold at the Sofia Junior World Cup, she qualified and won gold in rope and clubs final. Ermolova was selected to compete at the 2016 European Junior Championships where Russia won Team gold (together with Polina Shmatko and Maria Sergeeva), Ermolova qualified for the rope finals winning the gold medal.

Ermolova suffered an ankle injury in 2017 and underwent operation in Germany, she required to be on crutches for a few months.

A few months later she retired from competition.

== Routine music information ==
| Year | Apparatus | Music title |
|---|---|---|
| 2016 | Hoop | Introduction and Rondo Capriccioso by Camille Saint-Saëns |
| 2016 | Ball | Valse Sentimentale, Op. 51, No. 6 by London Festival Orchestra |
| 2016 | Clubs | Cipollino, Act II, Scene 3: Pursuit The Key Held by Little Cherry by Karen Khachaturian |
| 2016 | Rope | Papaveri by Robertino Loretti |
| 2015 | Hoop | Berozka by Orkestr Gosudarstvennogo Khoreograficheskogo Ansamblya |
| 2015 | Ball | Valse Sentimentale, Op. 51, No. 6 by London Festival Orchestra |
| 2015 | Clubs | Barber Of Seville: Overture by Apollo Symphony Orchestra |
| 2015 | Rope | Papaveri by Robertino Loretti |
