= Nita Jamagidze =

Georgian rhythmic gymnast

- ნიტა ჯამაგიძე
- Born: 25 July 2011 (age 15) Tbilisi, Georgia

Gymnastics career
- Discipline: Rhythmic gymnastics
- Country represented: Georgia; (2025-)
- Club: Neli Saladze Academy
- Head coaches: Lali Dolidze, Meriem Jantez
- Assistant coaches: Elle Gavardashvili, Viktoriia Kuznetsova
Medal record
Representing Georgia
Junior European Championships
Gold medal – first place	2026 Varna	Clubs
Junior World Championships
Bronze medal – third place	2025 Sofia	Ball
European Cup
Gold medal – first place	2026 Baku	Junior Clubs
Silver medal – second place	2025 Burgas	Junior Ball

Nita Jamagidze (Georgian: ნიტა ჯამაგიძე; born 25 July 2011) is a Georgian rhythmic gymnast. She represents Georgia in international competitions.

== Career ==
In November 2023 Jamagidze was a dancer along Barbare Kajaia for the Georgian Junior Eurovision act.

=== Junior ===
She became a junior in 2025, debuting at the Aphrodite Cup where she was 7th overall among gymnast born in 2011. She qualified to hoop final, finishing 5th. Weeks later she won gold with hoop and silver with ball at the AGF trophy in Azerbaijan. In May she took part in the European Cup in Burgas, being 6th in the All-Around, 7th with hoop and won silver in the junior ball final. She was then selected for the 2025 Junior World Championships in Sofia, winning bronze in the ball final. In September, she competed at Czech Junior Cup in Brno, where she took 5th place in all-around and won gold medal in ball final.

In 2026 she made her debut at the Miss Valentine Grand Prix in Tartu, winning bronze in teams, along Elene Bakradze, and with clubs, gold with hoop and with ball. In April, she won silver medal in clubs final at AGF Trophy in Azerbaijan. Later that month she won gold medal in all-around and Georgian National Championships. She won gold medal with clubs and 5th place with ball at European Cup in Baku. In May, she was selected to represent Georgia at the 2026 European Championships in Varna, Bulgaria. She took 4th place in team competitiong alongside Elene Bakradze and Milla Shavladze. She took 5th place in ball and won gold medal in the clubs final.

== Achievements ==
- First Georgian rhythmic gymnast to win a medal at the World Championships at either junior and senior level by winning bronze with ball at the 2025 Junior World Championships.
- First Georgian rhythmic gymnast to win a gold medal in an individual apparatus final at the European Championships.

== Routine music information ==
Year	Apparatus	Music title
2027	Hoop	Celestial Judgment by Nocturne Dominus
2027	Ball	This Is Who I Am (from "The Day of Jackal") by Celeste
2027	Clubs	Devil in the Details by Max Schad
2027	Ribbon	
2026	Hoop	Moonlight Sonata (No Choir) by Suprhot
2026	Ball	A Time For Us by Joslin
2026	Clubs	Devil in the Details by Max Schad
2026	Ribbon	Love Triangle by Cirque du Soleil
2025	Hoop	
2025	Ball	Succession (Main Title Theme) by Nicholas Britell
2025	Clubs	
2025	Ribbon	
