= 2026 FIG Rhythmic Gymnastics World Cup series =

International gymnastics contest

FIG Rhythmic Gymnastics World Cup series
- Location: various — see locations
- Date: March 28 – July 12, 2026 see schedule

The 2026 FIG World Cup circuit in Rhythmic Gymnastics is a series of competitions officially organized and promoted by the International Gymnastics Federation.

== Schedule ==
World Cup
Date	Event	Location	Type
March 28—30	FIG World Cup 2026	(Bulgaria) Sofia	Individuals and groups
April 10—12	FIG World Cup 2026	(Uzbekistan) Tashkent	Individuals and groups
April 17—19	FIG World Cup 2026	(Azerbaijan) Baku	Individuals and groups
July 10—12	FIG World Cup 2026	(Italy) Milan	Individuals and groups

World Challenge Cup
May 15—17	FIG World Challenge Cup 2026	(Portugal) Portimão	Individuals and groups
June 19—21	FIG World Challenge Cup 2026	(China) Beijing	Individuals and groups
June 26—28	FIG World Challenge Cup 2026	(Romania) Cluj Napoca	Individuals and groups

== Medal winners ==
(AIN1) = Individual Neutral Athletes from Belarus
(AIN2) = Individual Neutral Athletes from Russia

=== All-around ===
==== Individual ====
Competitions	Gold	Silver	Bronze
World Cup
Sofia	(Ukraine) Taisiia Onofriichuk	(Bulgaria) Stiliana Nikolova	(Italy) Sofia Raffaeli
Tashkent	(Individual Neutral Athletes) Maria Borisova (AIN2)	(Germany) Darja Varfolomeev	(Uzbekistan) Takhmina Ikromova
Baku	(Ukraine) Taisiia Onofriichuk	(Germany) Darja Varfolomeev	(Bulgaria) Stiliana Nikolova
Milan	(Germany) Darja Varfolomeev	(Italy) Sofia Raffaeli	(Italy) Tara Dragas
World Challenge Cup
Portimão	(Italy) Sofia Raffaeli	(Israel) Daniela Munits	(Italy) Tara Dragas
Beijing	(China) Wang Qi	(Russia) Sofiia Ilteriakova	(Poland) Liliana Lewinska
Cluj Napoca	(Germany) Darja Varfolomeev	(Ukraine) Taisiia Onofriichuk	(Uzbekistan) Takhmina Ikromova

==== Group ====
Competitions	Gold	Silver	Bronze
World Cup
Sofia	Individual Neutral Athletes 2	Germany	Bulgaria
Tashkent	China	Kazakhstan	Individual Neutral Athletes 1
Baku	Israel	Spain	Individual Neutral Athletes 2
Milan	Brazil	China	Spain
World Challenge Cup
Portimão	Spain	Germany	Israel
Beijing	China	Russia	Belarus
Cluj Napoca	Israel	Germany	Uzbekistan

=== Apparatus ===
==== Hoop ====
Competitions	Gold	Silver	Bronze
World Cup
Sofia	(Ukraine) Taisiia Onofriichuk	(Individual Neutral Athletes) Sofiia Ilteriakova (AIN2)	(Italy) Sofia Raffaeli
Tashkent	(Uzbekistan) Takhmina Ikromova	(Individual Neutral Athletes) Maria Borisova (AIN2)	(Germany) Darja Varfolomeev
Baku	(Ukraine) Taisiia Onofriichuk	(Bulgaria) Stiliana Nikolova	(Individual Neutral Athletes) Sofiia Ilteriakova (AIN2)
Milan	(Italy) Sofia Raffaeli	(Ukraine) Taisiia Onofriichuk	(Uzbekistan) Takhmina Ikromova
World Challenge Cup
Portimão	(Italy) Sofia Raffaeli	(Turkey) Hatice Gokce Emir	(United States) Rin Keys
Beijing	(Russia) Arina Kovshova	(China) Wang Qi	(Russia) Sofiia Ilteriakova
Cluj Napoca	(Ukraine) Taisiia Onofriichuk	(Germany) Darja Varfolomeev	(Cyprus) Vera Tugolukova

==== Ball ====
Competitions	Gold	Silver	Bronze
World Cup
Sofia	(Ukraine) Taisiia Onofriichuk	(Bulgaria) Stiliana Nikolova	(Italy) Sofia Raffaeli
Tashkent	(Uzbekistan) Takhmina Ikromova	(United States) Rin Keys	(Uzbekistan) Lola Djuraeva
Baku	(Germany) Darja Varfolomeev	(Italy) Sofia Raffaeli	(Bulgaria) Stiliana Nikolova
Milan	(Germany) Darja Varfolomeev	(Italy) Tara Dragas	(Cyprus) Vera Tugolukova
World Challenge Cup
Portimão	(Italy) Tara Dragas	(Italy) Sofia Raffaeli	(Cyprus) Vera Tugolukova
Beijing	(Russia) Sofiia Ilteriakova	(China) Wang Qi	(Russia) Arina Kovshova
Cluj Napoca	(Poland) Liliana Lewinska	(Ukraine) Taisiia Onofriichuk	(Romania) Amalia Lica

==== Clubs ====
Competitions	Gold	Silver	Bronze
World Cup
Sofia	(Bulgaria) Eva Brezalieva	(Italy) Sofia Raffaeli	(Bulgaria) Stiliana Nikolova
Tashkent	(Germany) Darja Varfolomeev	(Uzbekistan) Takhmina Ikromova	(Uzbekistan) Lola Djuraeva
Baku	(Germany) Darja Varfolomeev	(Individual Neutral Athletes) Sofiia Ilteriakova (AIN2)	(Ukraine) Taisiia Onofriichuk
Milan	(Germany) Darja Varfolomeev	(Bulgaria) Stiliana Nikolova	(Israel) Daniela Munits
World Challenge Cup
Portimão	(Israel) Alona Tal Franco	(Cyprus) Vera Tugolukova	(Spain) Alba Bautista
Beijing	(Russia) Sofiia Ilteriakova	(China) Wang Qi	(Poland) Liliana Lewinska
Cluj Napoca	(Germany) Darja Varfolomeev	(Cyprus) Vera Tugolukova	(Poland) Liliana Lewinska

==== Ribbon ====
Competitions	Gold	Silver	Bronze
World Cup
Sofia	(Ukraine) Taisiia Onofriichuk	(Individual Neutral Athletes) Alina Harnasko (AIN1)	(Israel) Meital Maayan Sumkin
Tashkent	(Germany) Darja Varfolomeev	(United States) Rin Keys	(Brazil) Geovanna Santos
Baku	(Germany) Darja Varfolomeev	(Italy) Sofia Raffaeli	(Kazakhstan) Akmaral Yerekesheva
Milan	(Bulgaria) Stiliana Nikolova	(Russia) Arina Kovshova	(Uzbekistan) Takhmina Ikromova
World Challenge Cup
Portimão	(Italy) Tara Dragas	(Cyprus) Vera Tugolukova	(Individual Neutral Athletes) Alina Harnasko (AIN1)
Beijing	(Russia) Sofiia Ilteriakova	(China) Wang Qi	(Uzbekistan) Nataliya Usova
Cluj Napoca	(Ukraine) Taisiia Onofriichuk	(Uzbekistan) Takhmina Ikromova	(Israel) Daniela Munits

==== 5 Balls ====
Competitions	Gold	Silver	Bronze
World Cup
Sofia	China	Individual Neutral Athletes 2	Uzbekistan
Tashkent	China	Individual Neutral Athletes 2	Individual Neutral Athletes 1
Baku	Israel	Brazil	Uzbekistan
Milan	Spain	Brazil	China
World Challenge Cup
Portimão	Spain	Germany	Israel
Beijing	China	Russia	Uzbekistan
Cluj Napoca	Israel	Germany	Poland

==== 3 Hoops and 2 Clubs ====
Competitions	Gold	Silver	Bronze
World Cup
Sofia	Individual Neutral Athletes 2	Italy	Individual Neutral Athletes 1
Tashkent	China	Brazil	Individual Neutral Athletes 2
Baku	Spain	Individual Neutral Athletes 2	Bulgaria
Milan	China	Germany	Ukraine
World Challenge Cup
Portimão	Germany	Israel	Spain
Beijing	China	Belarus	Russia
Cluj Napoca	Israel	Poland	Uzbekistan

== Overall medal table ==
Rank	Nation	Gold	Silver	Bronze	Total
1	Germany (GER)	11	9	1	21
2	China (CHN)	9	5	1	15
3	Ukraine (UKR)	8	3	2	13
4	Israel (ISR)	6	2	5	13
5	Italy (ITA)	5	7	5	17
6	Russia (RUS)	4	4	3	11
7	Spain (ESP)	4	1	3	8
8	Individual Neutral Athletes 2 (AIN2)	3	5	3	11
9	Bulgaria (BUL)	2	4	5	11
10	Uzbekistan (UZB)	2	2	2	6
11	Brazil (BRA)	1	3	1	5
12	Poland (POL)	1	1	4	6
13	Cyprus (CYP)	0	3	3	6
14	Individual Neutral Athletes 1 (AIN1)	0	2	4	6
15	United States (USA)	0	2	1	3
16	Belarus (BLR)	0	1	1	2
16	Kazakhstan (KAZ)	0	1	1	2
18	Turkey (TUR)	0	1	0	1
19	Romania (ROU)	0	0	1	1
Totals (19 entries)		56	56	46	158

== See also ==
- 2026 FIG Artistic Gymnastics World Cup series
