= Russian Rhythmic Gymnastics Championships =

The Russian Rhythmic Gymnastics National Championship (Russian: Чемпионат России по художественной гимнастике) is an annual rhythmic gymnastics national competition in Russia.

== History ==
The Russian Gymnastics Federation of the Russian Soviet Federative Socialist Republic was established in 1963. For many years, it was a division of the Rhythmic Gymnastics Federation of the USSR that contributed to the development of gymnastics in the RSFSR as an independent sport by strengthening its financial base, improving the methods and practice of the training process, and facilitating the growth of the sport.

The "Russian Rhythmic Gymnastics Federation" (abbreviated VFHG) is a Russian public organization. The federation held their inaugural conference on September 12, 1991, in Ivanovo, and was officially registered with the Ministry of Justice of the RSFSR on January 9, 1992.

Changes and additions to the Charter Conference VFHG were approved on February 16, 1999. The Ministry of Justice of the Russian Federation VFHG issued a new certificate of registration on August 12, 1999.

Since 2019, the competition has been held at the Irina Viner-Usmanova Gymnastics Palace, located near the Novogorsk training center.

== Russian Championships Medalists ==
Competitions preceding 1992 were held before the breakup of the USSR as Soviet Championships.

Year	All-around Champion
1994	Amina Zaripova
1995	Amina Zaripova
1996	Yanina Batyrchina
1997	Anna Shishova
1998	Yanina Batyrchina
1999	Alina Kabaeva
2000	Alina Kabaeva
2001	Alina Kabaeva
2002	Zarina Gizikova
2003	Irina Tchachina
2004	Alina Kabaeva

All-around medalists
Year	Location	Gold	Silver	Bronze	Details
2005	Kazan	Irina Tchachina	Vera Sessina	Svetlana Putintseva	
2006	Moscow	Alina Kabaeva	Vera Sessina	Olga Kapranova	
2007	Moscow	Alina Kabaeva	Vera Sessina	Marina Shpekht	
2008	St. Petersburg	Evgenia Kanaeva	Vera Sessina	Alexandra Solovieva	
2009	Penza	Daria Kondakova	Daria Dmitrieva	Olga Stryukova	
2010	Penza	Daria Dmitrieva	Ekaterina Donich	Yana Lukonina	
2011	Penza	Margarita Mamun	Ekaterina Donich	Natalia Bulycheva	
2012	Penza	Margarita Mamun	Daria Svatkovskaya	Anna Trubnikova	
2013	Kazan	Margarita Mamun	Elizaveta Nazarenkova	Anna Trubnikova	
2014	Penza	Yana Kudryavtseva	Margarita Mamun	Aleksandra Soldatova	
2015	Penza	Yana Kudryavtseva	Arina Averina	Dina Averina	
2016	Sochi	Aleksandra Soldatova	Margarita Mamun	Dina Averina	
2017	Penza	Dina Averina	Aleksandra Soldatova	Arina Averina	
2018	Sochi	Dina Averina	Aleksandra Soldatova	Ekaterina Selezneva	
2019	Moscow	Arina Averina	Dina Averina	Karina Kuznetsova	
2020	Moscow	Arina Averina	Lala Kramarenko	Dina Averina	
2021	Moscow	Arina Averina	Lala Kramarenko	Dina Averina	
2022	Moscow	Dina Averina	Arina Averina	Lala Kramarenko	
2023	Moscow	Anna Popova	Maria Borisova	Lala Kramarenko	
2024	Moscow	Lala Kramarenko	Karina Kireeva	Arina Yankovskaya	
2025	Moscow	Maria Borisova	Karina Kireeva	Ulyana Janus	
2026	Moscow	Arina Kovshova	Sofia Ilteryakova	Eva Kononova	
