= Hoop (rhythmic gymnastics) =

Performing apparatus

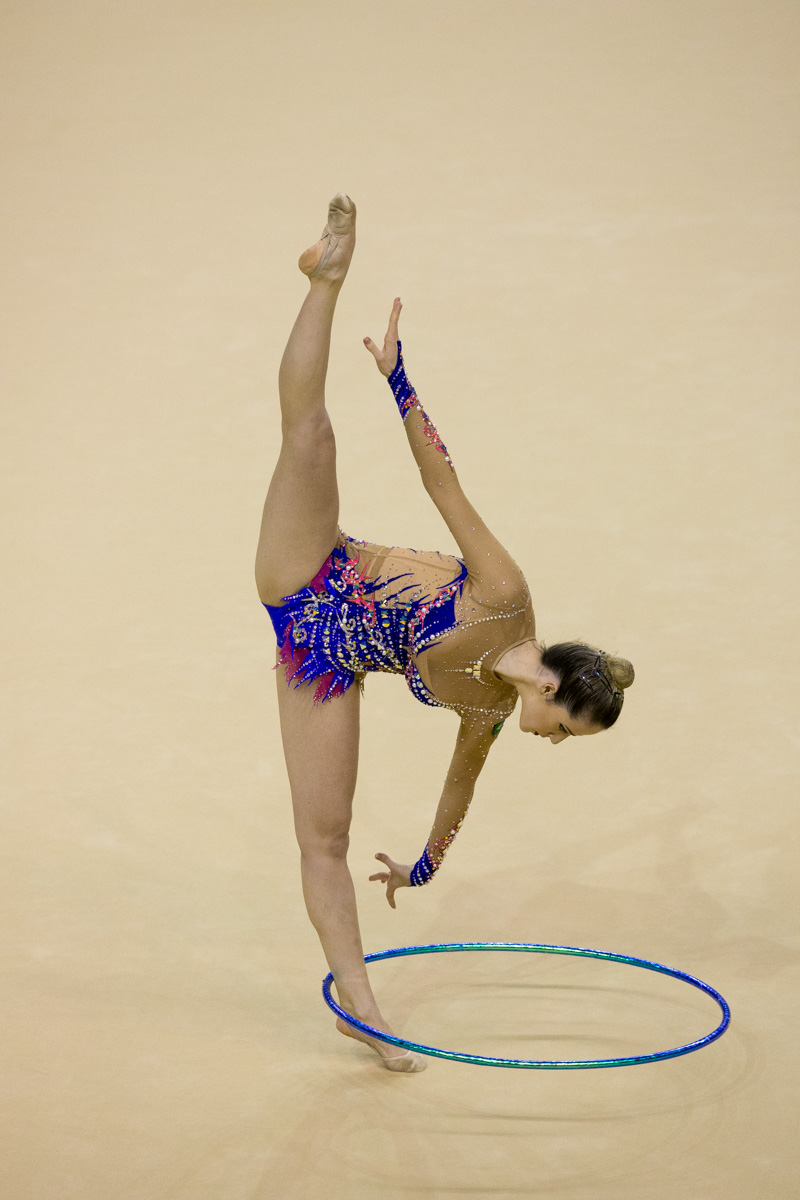
Natália Gaudio performing with the hoop

The hoop is an apparatus used in the sport of rhythmic gymnastics. It is one of the five apparatuses utilized in this discipline, alongside the ball, clubs, ribbon, and rope.

== History ==
The hoop was introduced to the early form of the sport in the 1920s. At the 1936 Summer Olympics, Hinrich Medau, one of the developers of "modern gymnastics" (the forerunner to rhythmic gymnastics), choreographed a routine with five hoops to represent the Olympic rings, popularizing the apparatus in gymnastics programs. Hoops were used in the team portable apparatus competitions for women at both the 1952 and 1956 Olympics before the event was discontinued. During the 1960s, the International Gymnastics Federation established official rules and competitions for rhythmic gymnastics. The hoop was recognised as an official apparatus from the beginning, along with the ball and rope. From 2001-2012, each apparatus had a compulsory body group of movements that had to predominate in the exercise; hoop was an exception in requiring a balance of all four body groups.

Over the years, the design and materials of the hoop have evolved to enhance performance. Early hoops were often made of wood, but modern hoops are typically constructed from durable plastics that can withstand rigorous use and provide better flexibility.

== Specifications and technique ==
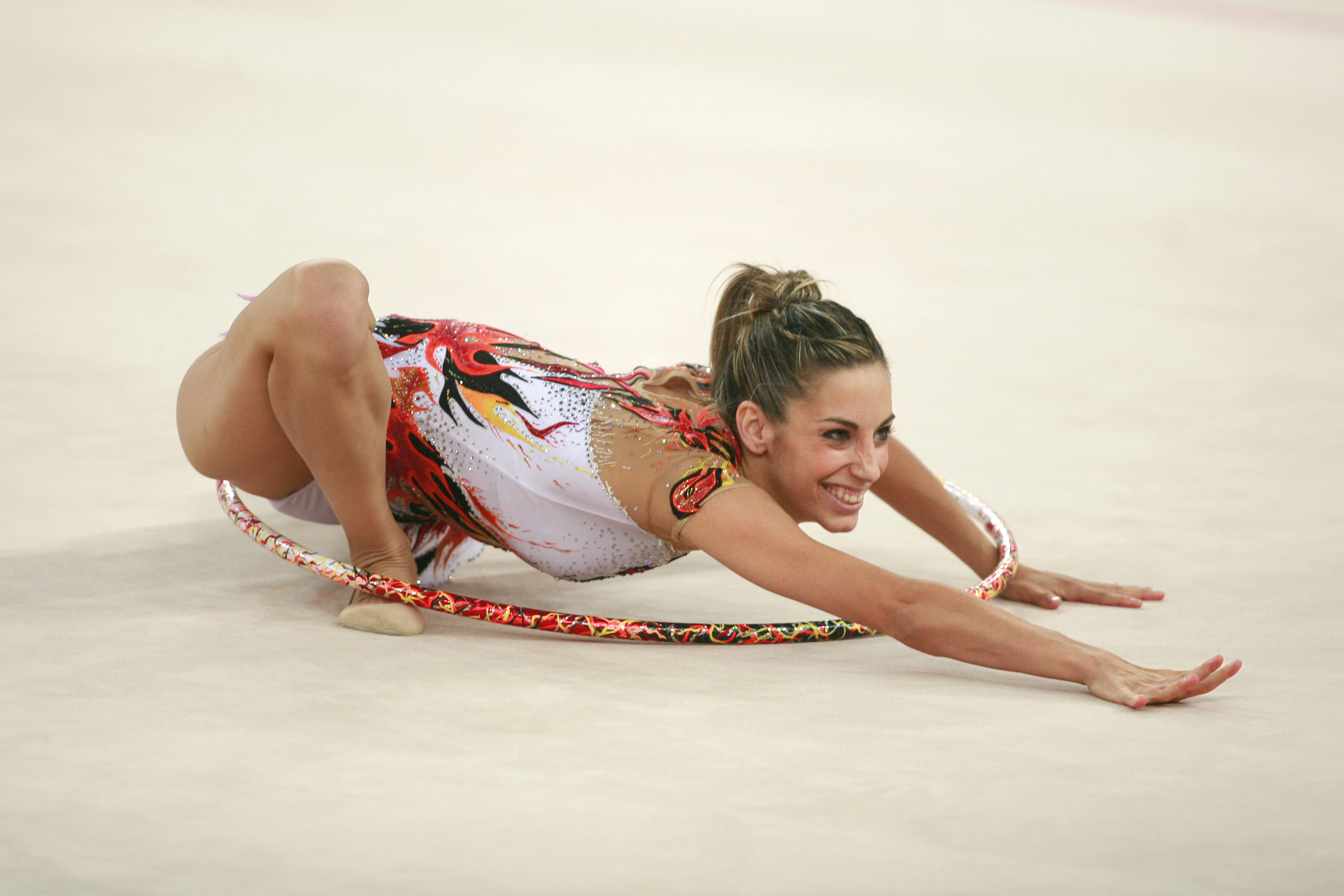
Almudena Cid performing with a hoop decorated to match her leotard

The hoop may be made of plastic or wood. It is common to bind the hoop with decorative tape to add strength, weight, and color. The official specifications for the hoop are as follows:

- Diameter: 80 to 90 cm
- Weight: Minimum of 300 grams

Rhythmic hoops are springy and can be easily rebounded, and the size and shape makes its trajectory stable when flown. However, the large size and relative fragility of the hoop can cause difficulties when gymnasts fly to competitions.

Many of the techniques of rhythmic gymnastics have been adopted by the modern hooping community.

== Elements ==
Gymnasts perform a variety of elements with the hoop, including high or low throws, spinning it around different body parts like a hula hoop, or suspending it from the body with no support during a rotational body difficulty. During the exercise, the gymnast should perform elements with the hoop moving on different planes and axes and in different directions. The elements that are considered to be particular to the hoop are:

- Large roll of the hoop over at least two segments of the body (e.g. the torso and legs or torso and arms)
- Rolling the hoop on the floor
- Rotating the hoop around its axis either around the fingers or around or on another part of the gymnast's body
- Rotating the hoop around its axis on the floor either with hand contact or allowing the hoop to spin freely
- Rotating the hoop around the hand or another part of the body
- Sliding the hoop over at least two segments of the body
- Passing through the hoop, either entirely or with two segments of the body

== Photo gallery ==
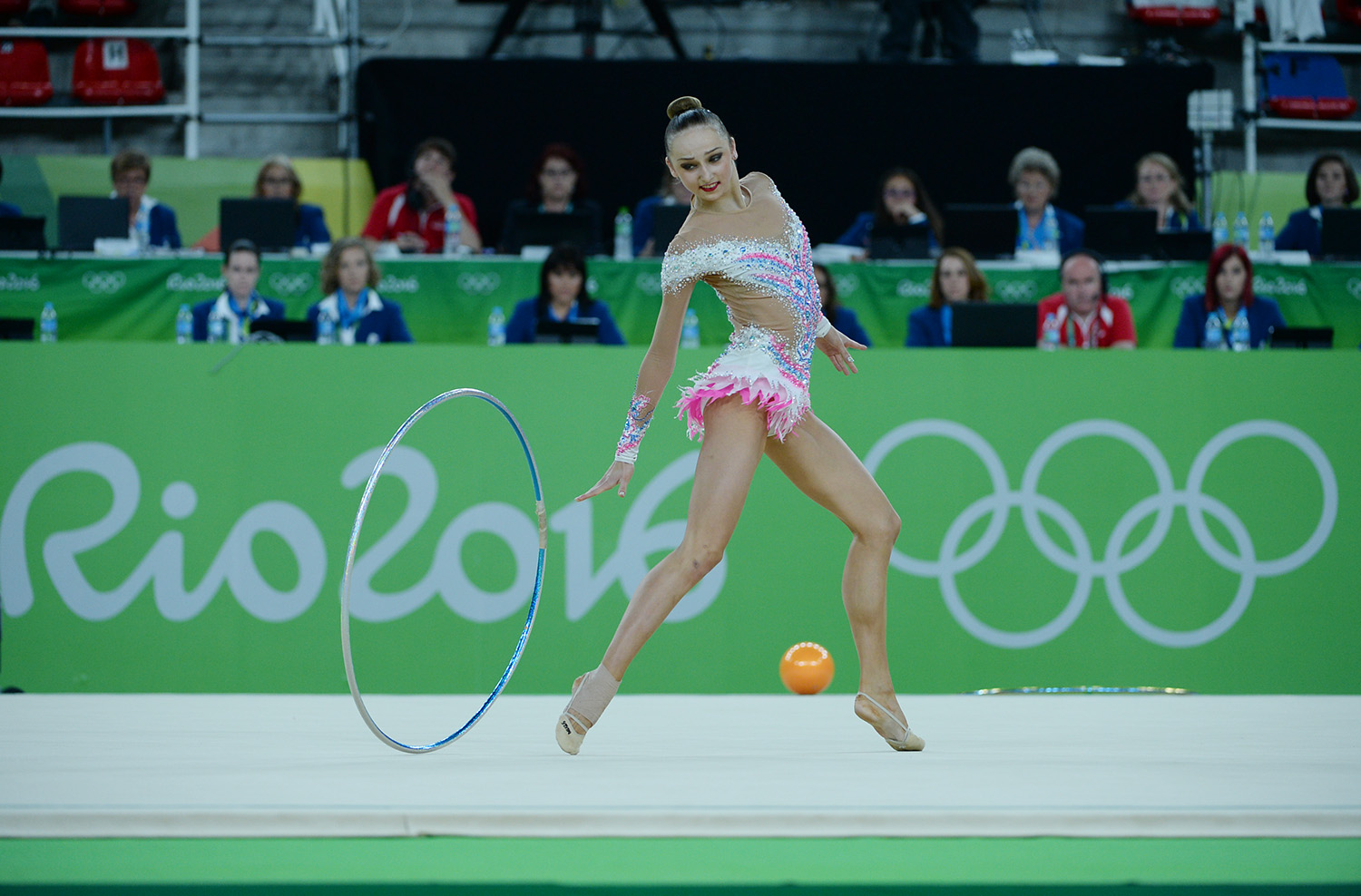
Rolling the hoop along the floor (Marina Durunda)

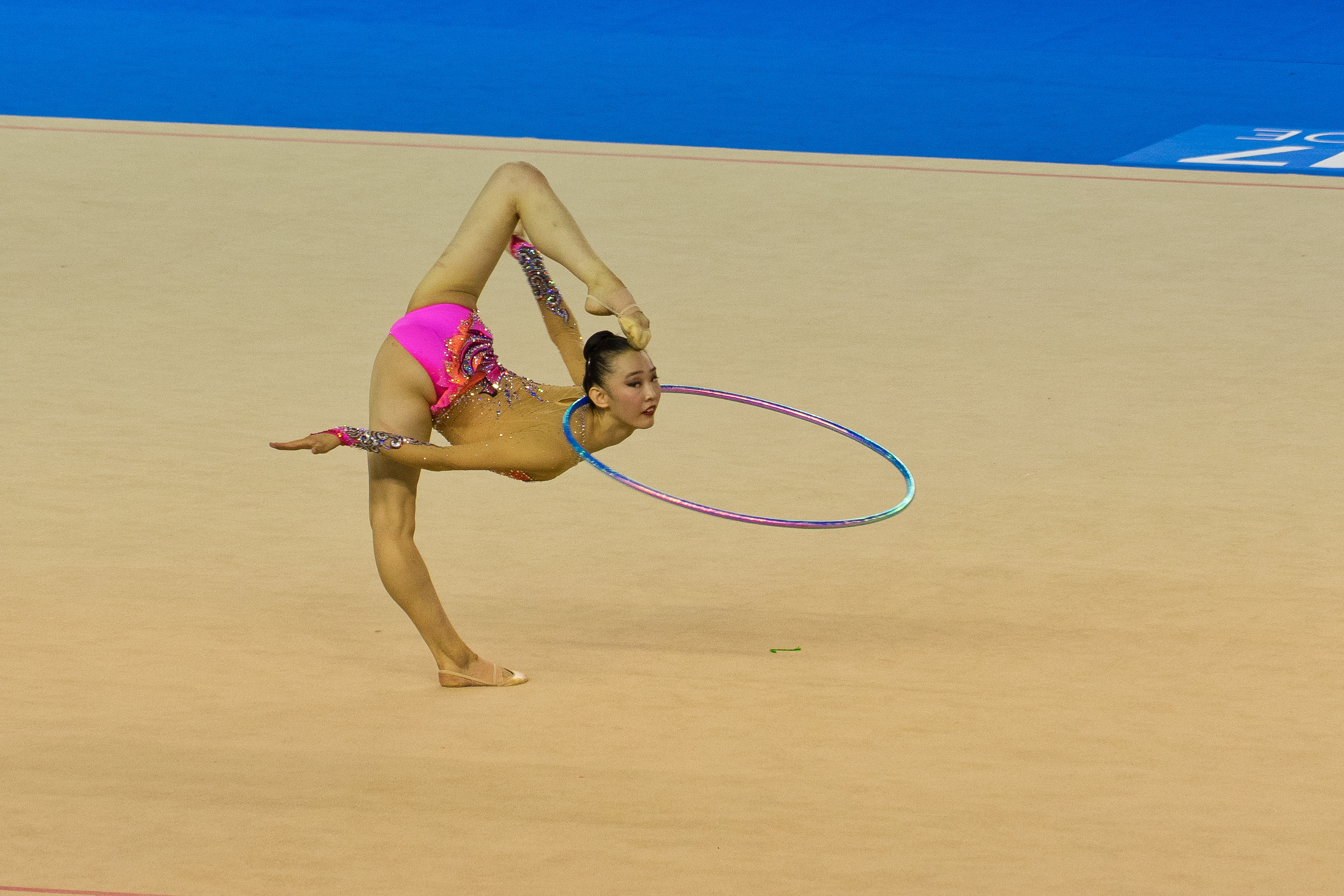
Suspending the hoop from the neck while rotating (Takana Tatsuzawa)

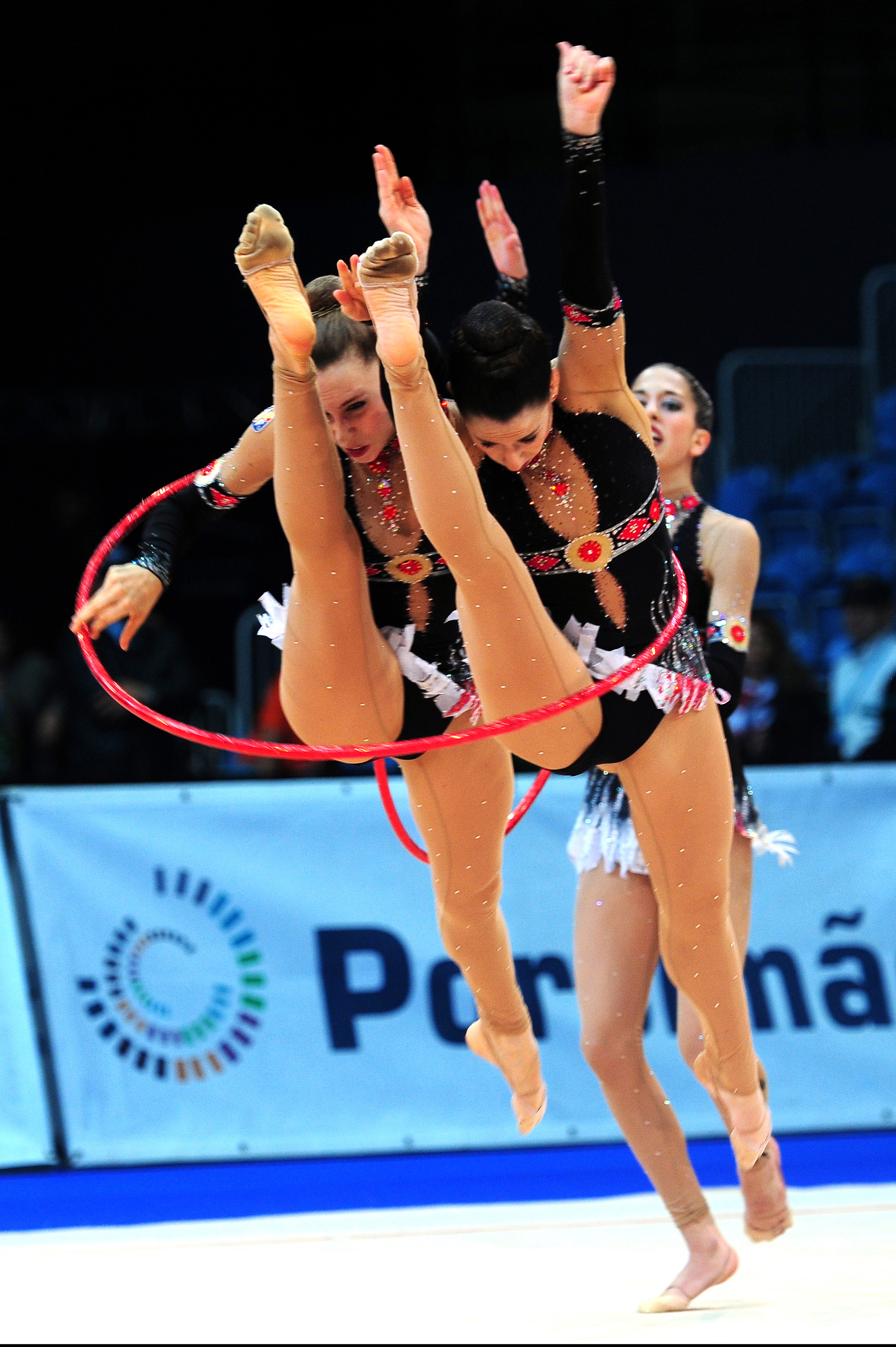
Two gymnasts passing through a hoop during a group exercise (Spanish group)

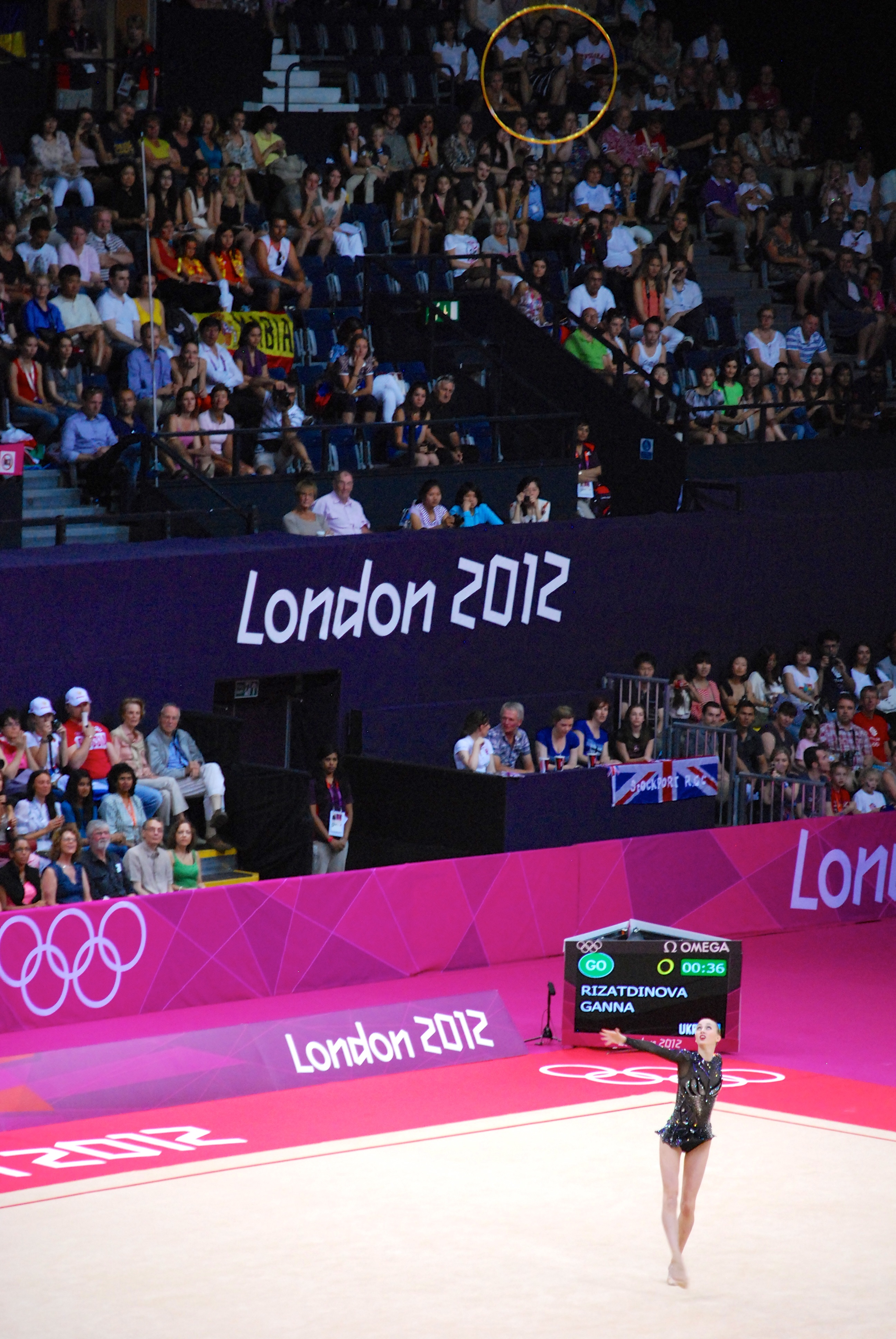
Performing under a high throw of the hoop (Hanna Rizatdinova)

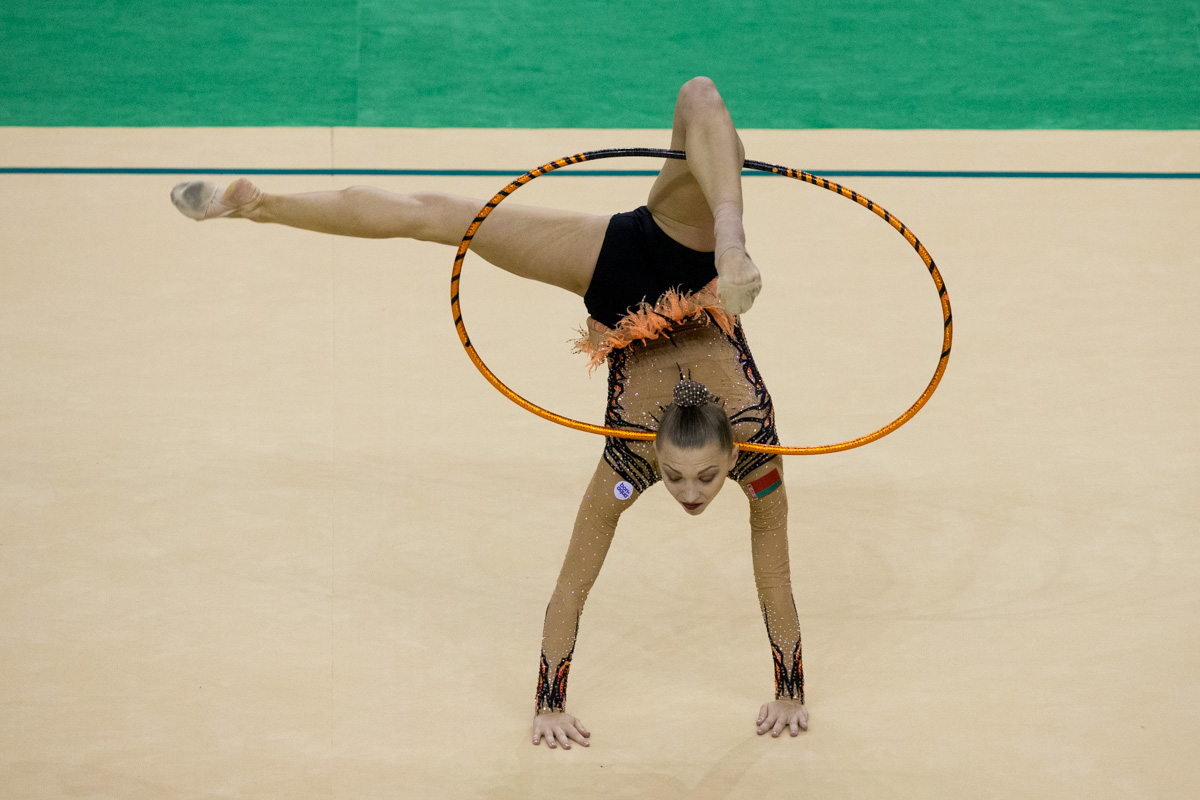
Catching the hoop between the neck and leg (Melitina Staniouta)

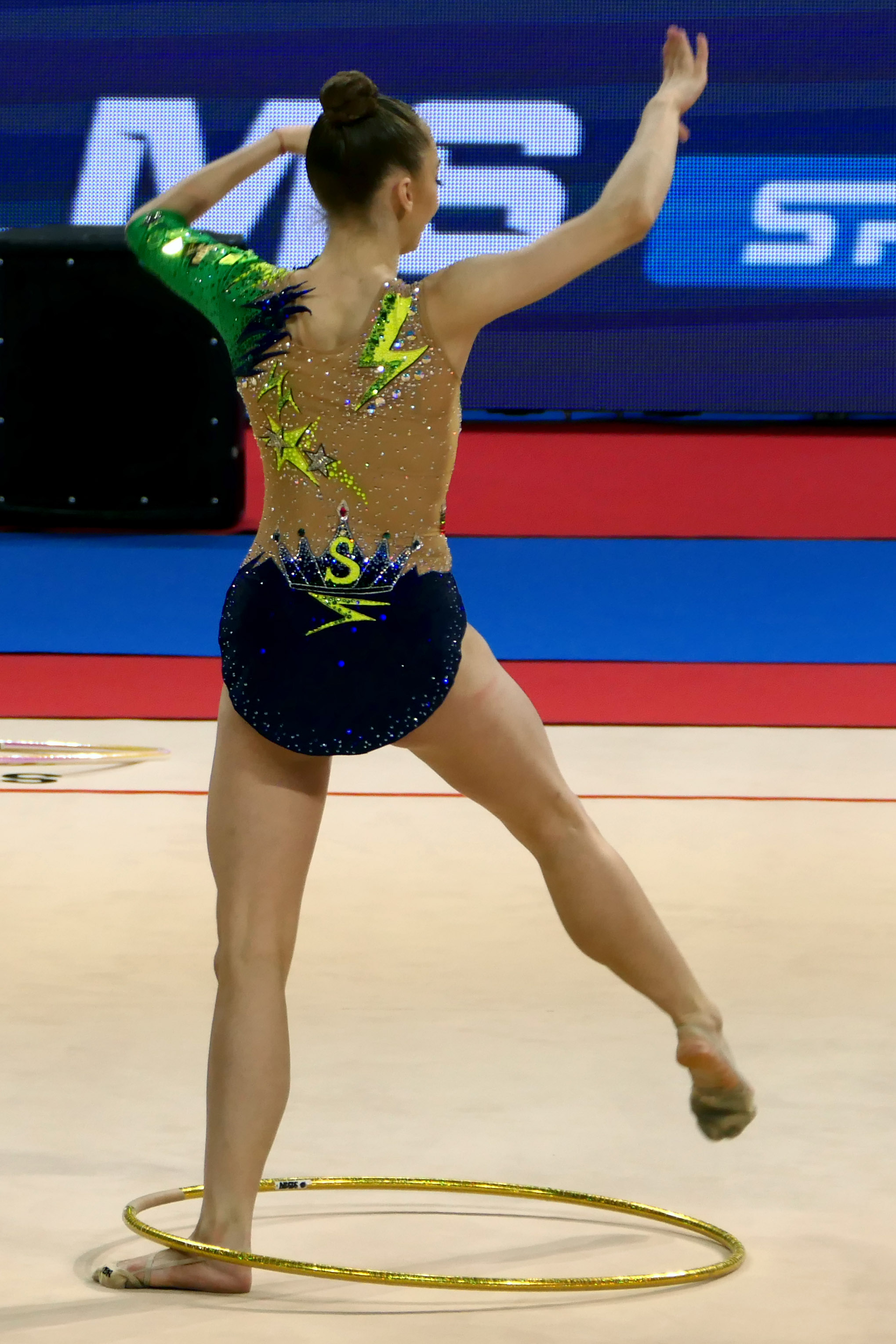
Preparing to throw the hoop using a foot (Boryana Kaleyn)

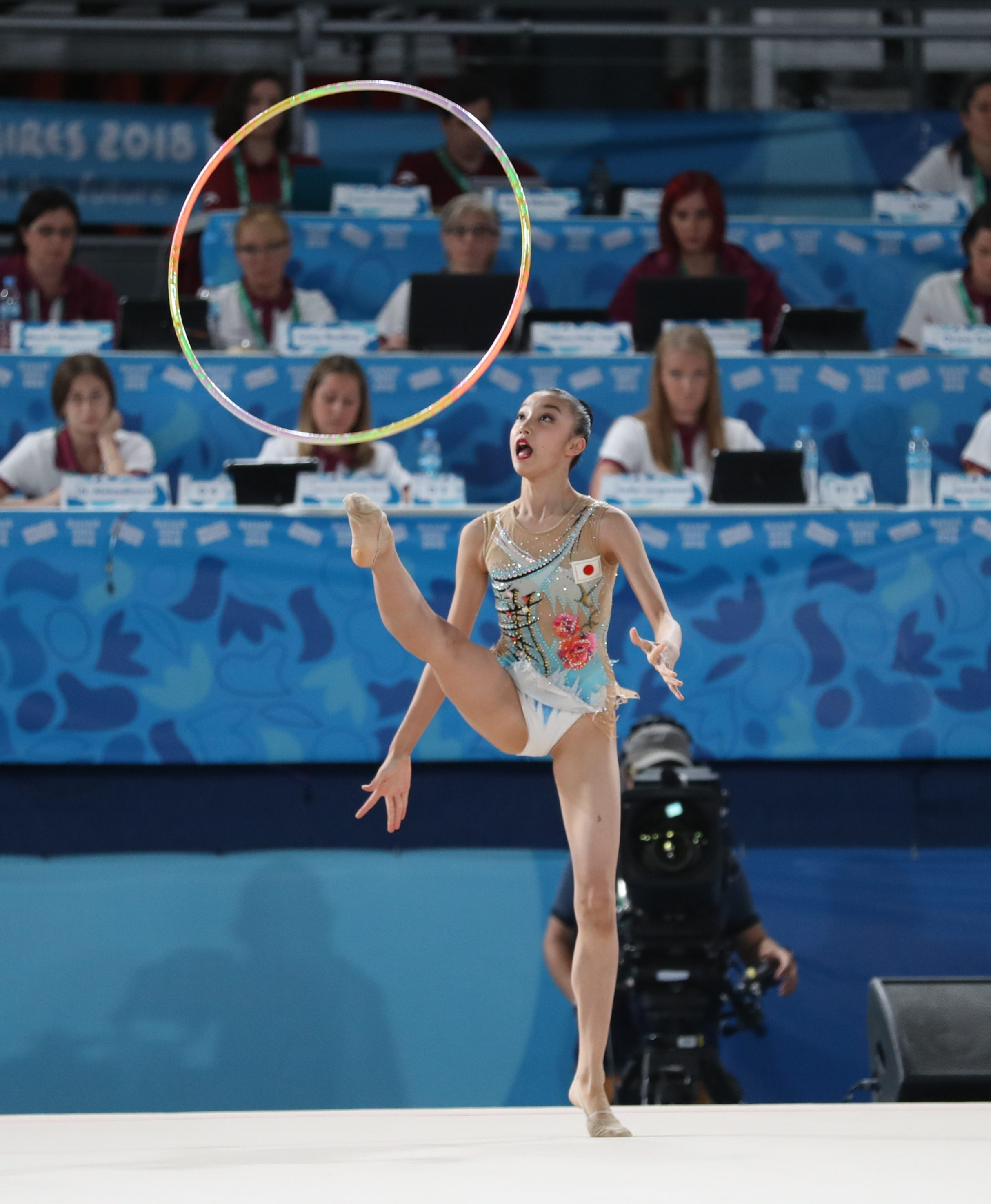
Bouncing the hoop off a leg (Aino Yamada)

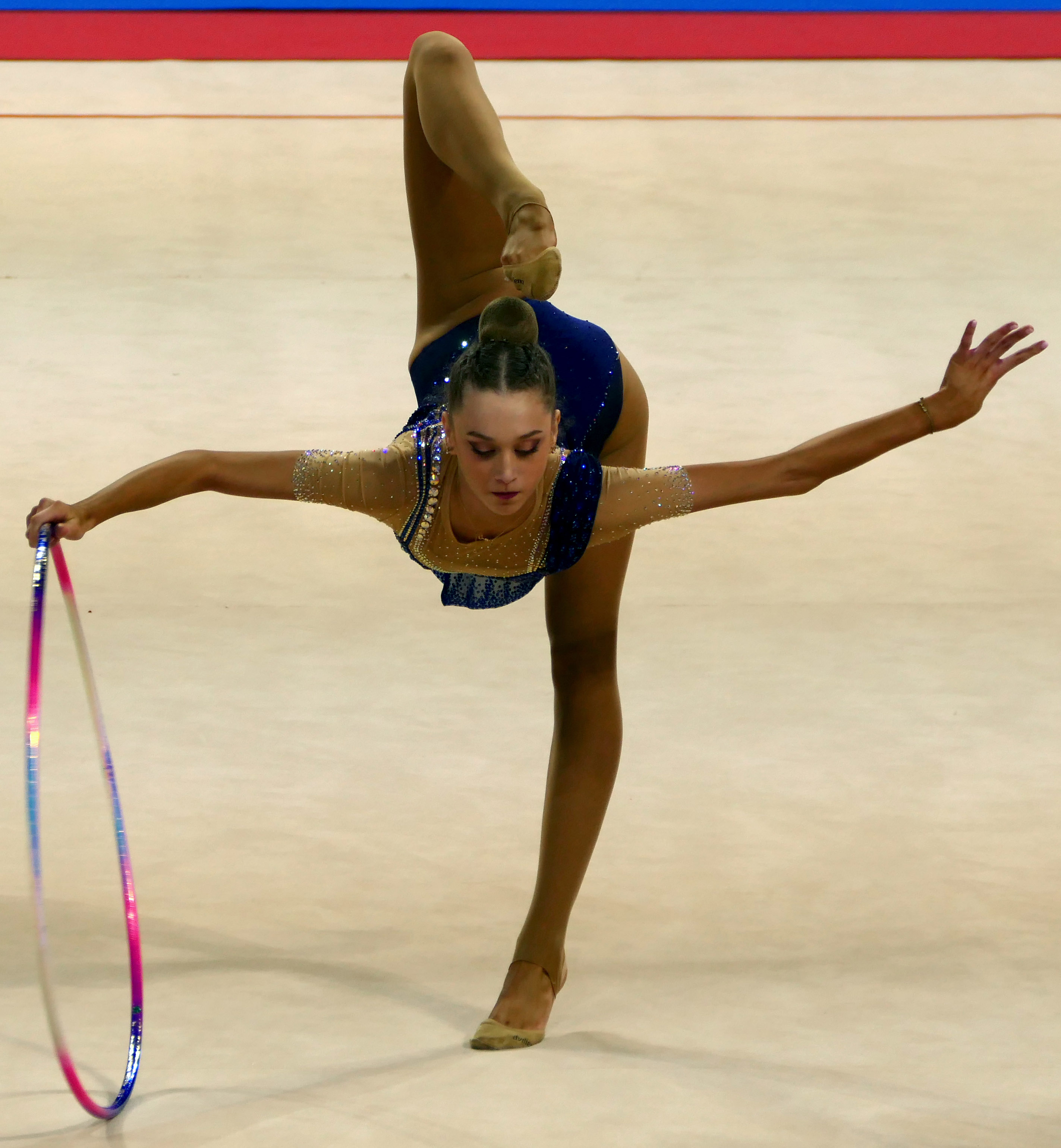
Rotating the hoop around its axis on the floor during a balance (Liliana Lewińska)

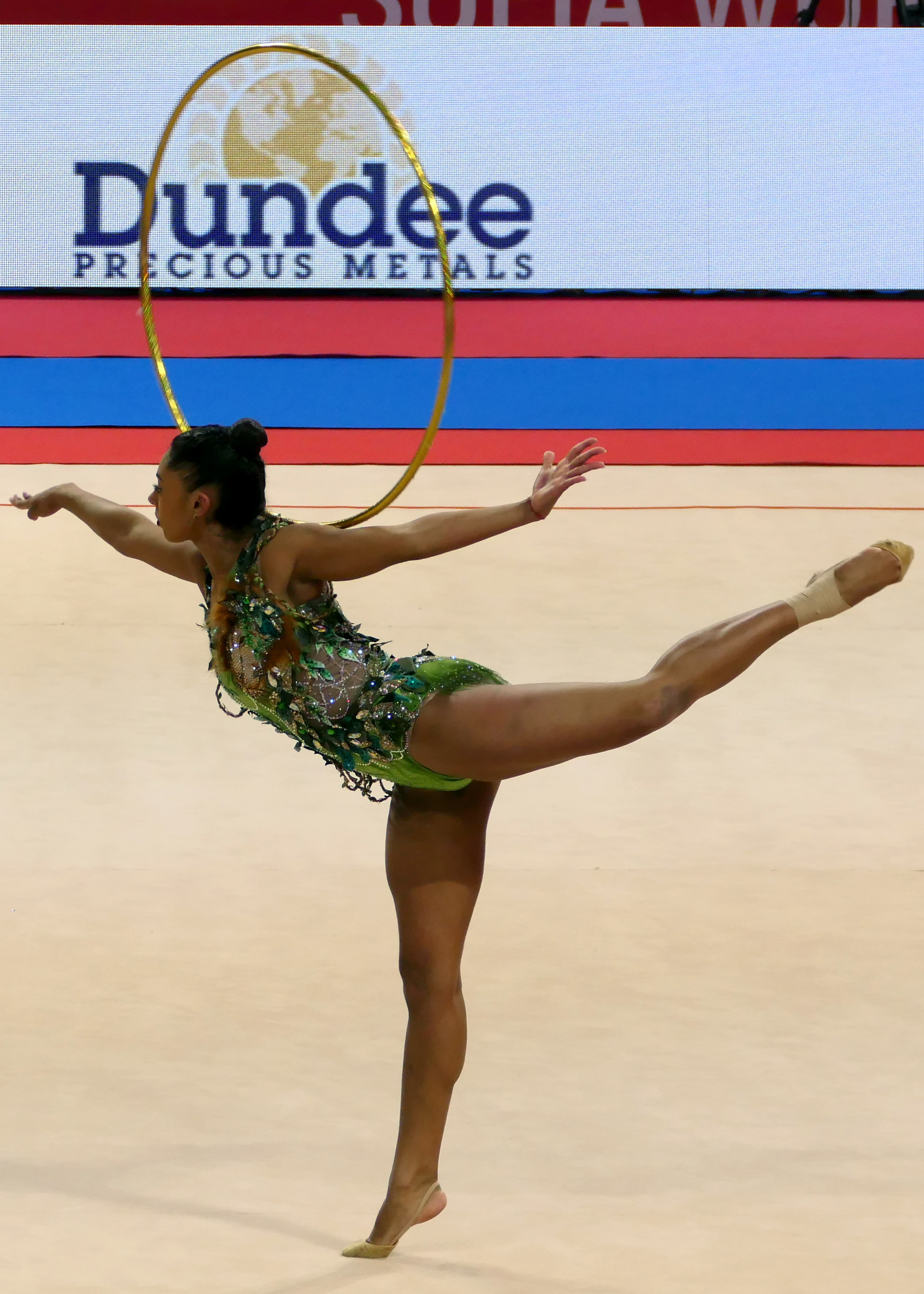
Rolling the hoop over the arms (Bárbara Domingos)

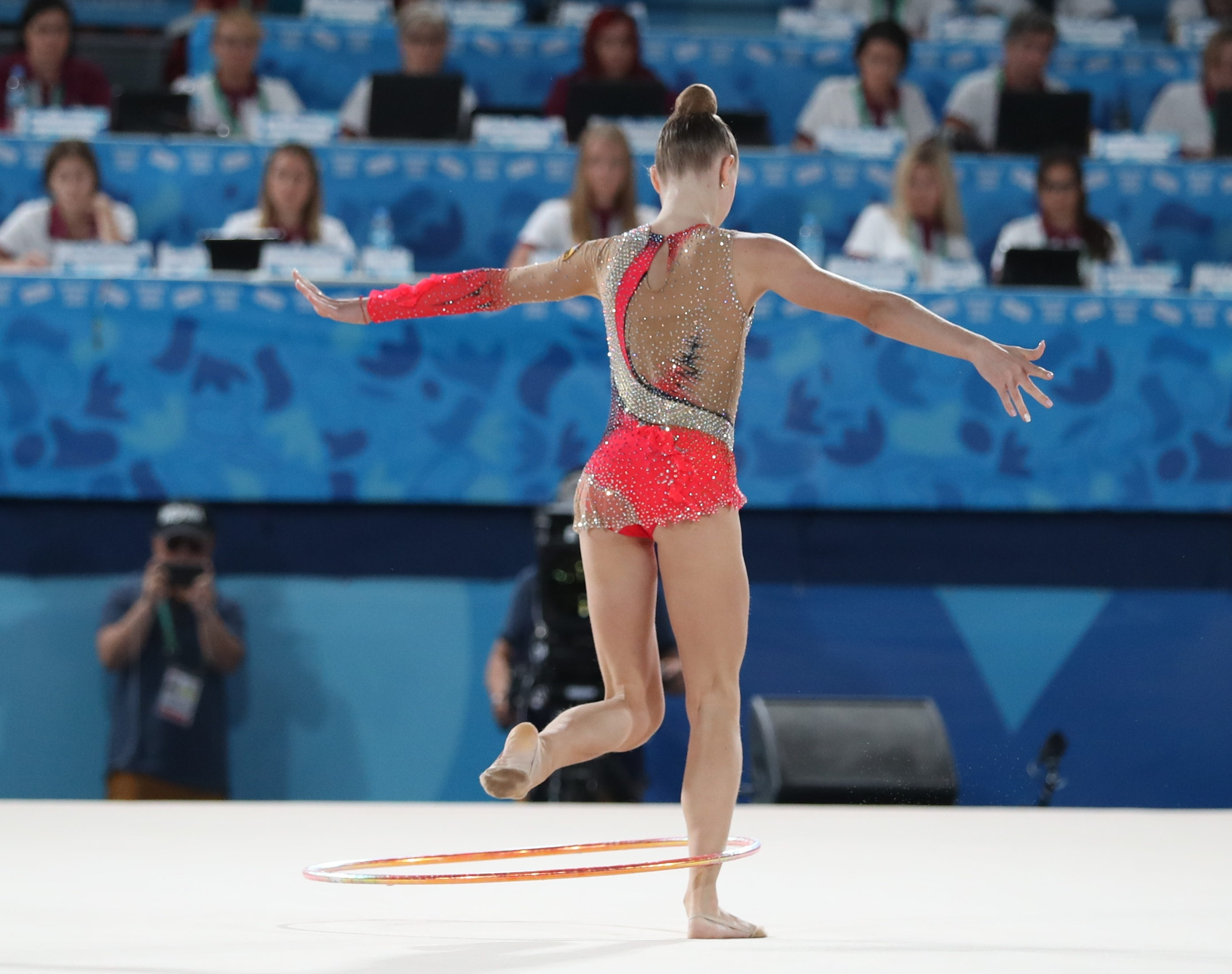
Rotating the hoop around a leg (Yulia Vodopyanova)
