= Polina Shmatko =

Russian rhythmic gymnast

- Full name: Polina Sergeyevna Shmatko
- Nickname: Polly
- Born: March 26, 2003 (age 23) Moscow, Russia
- Height: 173 cm (5 ft 8 in)

Gymnastics career
- Discipline: Rhythmic gymnastics
- Country represented: Russia (2015-2019)
- Club: Gazprom
- Gym: Novogorsk
- Head coach: Irina Viner
- Assistant coach: Lyaysan Savitskaya
Medal record
Junior European Championships
Gold medal – first place	2016 Holon	Ball
Gold medal – first place	2016 Holon	Clubs
Gold medal – first place	2016 Holon	Team
Gold medal – first place	2018 Guadalajara	Hoop
Gold medal – first place	2018 Guadalajara	Team

Polina Sergeyevna Shmatko (Russian: Полина Сергеевна Шматко, born March 26, 2003, in Moscow, Russia) is a Russian individual rhythmic gymnast. She is the 2016 European Junior Clubs, Ball champion and the 2018 European Junior Hoop champion. At national level she is the 2016 Russian Junior all-around silver medalist. She is 2018 European championships gold medalist in team event and in hoop finals. She retired because of health problems.

== Career ==
=== Junior ===
Shmatko first came to notice in the novice girls division at Miss Valentine 2012 in Tartu, Estonia. Shmatko later competed at the prestigious Russian rhythmic gymnastics competition at the 2015 Hope of Russia, winning the all-around gold.

In the 2016 season, Shmatko debuted in her first Junior Grand Prix at the Alina Cup, where she won gold for Team Russia with Alina Ermolova. She qualified for one apparatus final, where she won gold in ball. Shmatko competed at the Lisboa Junior World Cup where she won team gold (with Daria Pridannikova), she qualified to all event finals: winning gold in ball, silver in hoop, placed 6th in clubs and 8th in rope. She then won the all-around silver at the 2016 Russian Junior Championships behind Ermolova. She competed at the 2016 Junior Grand Prix Brno where Team Russia won silver, and qualified in two apparatus, winning silver in ball and bronze in clubs. At the Junior World Cup in Sofia, Shmatko won team gold but finished 6th in the ball final after dropping her ball twice. She was selected to compete at the 2016 European Junior Championships where she again won team gold (with Alina Ermolova and Maria Sergeeva). Shmatko also qualified for two apparatus finals, where she won gold in ball (17.100) and clubs (17.200), setting a junior record score under the 20-point CoP judging system.

In the 2017, Shmatko started the season at the Junior Grand Prix Moscow where she finished 4th in the all-around. Her next event was at the International Tournament of Lisbon where she won bronze in the all-around. At the Junior Grand Prix Marbella, Shmatko finished 4th in the all-around and won gold in Team (together with Lala Kramarenko). Shmatko competed at the Happy Caravan Cup in Tashkent where she won gold in team event, she qualified 2 apparatus finals taking the gold medal in clubs and silver in ball. On May 5–7, Shmatko competed at the Sofia Junior World Cup where she won silver in the all-around behind teammate Lala Kramarenko. In October 12–14, Shmatko won bronze in the all-around at the "2017 Hope of Russia".

In the 2018 season, Shmatko suffered a toe injury and withdrew from the nominative list for the Junior Grand Prix Moscow. She returned into competition on April 4–6 at the MTM Ljubljana tournament, she took bronze in the all-around and won silver in hoop and ball finals. On May 4–6, at the 2018 Junior World Cup Guadalajara, she won gold in team, hoop and bronze with clubs. Her next event was at the Junior Grand Prix Holon where she won 3 gold medals in team, hoop and clubs. Shmatko was selected to compete at the 2018 European Junior Championships held in Guadalajara, Spain, she won team gold (together with Lala Kramarenko, Daria Trubnikova and Anastasia Sergeeva), she also qualified into the hoop and won the final with a new personal best score in hoop of 18.825. Later on Shmatko confirmed that she is no longer doing gymnastics for at least 6 months due to health issues with her back. She retired in 2019. Her father is the politician and entrepreneur Sergei Shmatko, who died on November 7, 2021, as a result of COVID-19 disease.

== Routine music information ==
Year	Apparatus	Music title
2018	Hoop	Night on Bald Mountain by Modest Mussorgsky
2018	Ball	Earth Song by Michael Jackson
2018	Clubs	Run the World (Girls) by Beyoncé
2018	Ribbon	Hava Nagila by London Festival Orchestra & Chorus
2017	Hoop	Andromeda by Q-Factory
2017	Ball (second)	Earth Song by Michael Jackson
2017	Ball (first)	Monsieur L'Amour by Dalida
2017	Clubs (second)	I Am the Best (내가 제일 잘 나가) by 2NE1
2017	Clubs (first)	Remains of the Day by Danny Elfman
2017	Ribbon (second)	Hava Nagila by London Festival Orchestra & Chorus
2017	Ribbon (first)	Fantasia on Themes of Ryabinin, Op. 48, for piano and orchestra by Russian State Symphony Orchestra
2016	Hoop	?
2016	Ball	Tocala América, Amado Mio, Espana Cani by Cantores De Hispaliz, Cinema Serenade Ensemble
2016	Clubs	Kalinka (Russian Folk)
2016	Rope	Single Ladies (Put a Ring on It) by Beyoncé
2015	Free hands	Algo pequeñitto by Daniel Diges
2015	Ball	Tocala América, Amado Mio, Espana Cani by Cantores De Hispaliz, Cinema Serenade Ensemble
2015	Clubs	Kalinka (Russian Folk)
2015	Hoop	?

== Competitive Highlights ==
International: Junior
Year	Event	AA	Team	Hoop	Ball	Clubs	Ribbon
2018	European Junior Championships		1st	1st		8th (Q)	
2018	Junior Grand Prix Holon		1st	1st		1st	
2018	Junior World Cup Guadalajara		1st	1st		3rd	
2018	MTM Ljubljana tournament	3rd		2nd	2nd		
2017	Junior World Cup Sofia	2nd					
2017	Happy Caravan Cup		1st		2nd	1st	
2017	Junior Grand Prix Marbella	4th	1st				
2017	International Tournament of Lisbon	3rd			2nd		
2017	Junior Grand Prix Moscow	4th HC					
International: Junior 2016 Season
Year	Event	AA	Team	Hoop	Rope	Ball	Clubs
2016	European Junior Championships		1st			1st	1st
2016	Junior World Cup Sofia		1st			6th	
2016	Junior Grand Prix Brno		2nd			2nd	3rd
2016	Junior World Cup Lisboa		1st	2nd	8th	1st	6th
2016	Junior Grand Prix Moscow		1st			1st	
National
Year	Event	AA	Team	Hoop	Rope	Ball	Clubs
2016	Russian Junior Championships	2nd					
Q = Qualifications (Did not advance to Event Final due to the 2 gymnast per country rule, only Top 8 highest score); WD = Withdrew; NT = No Team Competition; OC/HC = Out of Competition(competed but scores not counted for qualifications/results)
