= Lala Kramarenko =

Russian rhythmic gymnast

- Full name: Lala Dmitrievna Kramarenko
- Born: December 6, 2004 (age 21) Moscow, Russia
- Height: 1.59 m (5 ft 3 in)

Gymnastics career
- Discipline: Rhythmic gymnastics
- Country represented: Russia; (2016–present)
- Club: MGFSO
- Gym: Novogorsk
- Head coach: Irina Viner
- Assistant coach: Lyaysan Savitskaya
- Choreographer: Tatiana Pomerantseva, Kirill Barkan
- Eponymous skills: The Kramarenko: Backscale pivot with free leg bent 30 degrees from a standing position or from a seated position
Medal record
International gymnastics competitions
| Event | 1st | 2nd | 3rd |
|---|---|---|---|
| European Championships | 1 | 0 | 0 |
| Grand Prix Final | 4 | 1 | 0 |
| Junior World Championships | 3 | 0 | 0 |
| Junior European Championships | 3 | 0 | 0 |
| Total | 11 | 1 | 0 |
Representing Russia
Rhythmic Gymnastics
European Championships
| Gold medal – first place | 2021 Varna | Team |
Grand Prix Final
| Gold medal – first place | 2021 Marbella | All-around |
| Gold medal – first place | 2021 Marbella | Hoop |
| Gold medal – first place | 2021 Marbella | Ball |
| Gold medal – first place | 2021 Marbella | Ribbon |
| Silver medal – second place | 2021 Marbella | Clubs |
Junior World Championships
| Gold medal – first place | 2019 Moscow | Ball |
| Gold medal – first place | 2019 Moscow | Clubs |
| Gold medal – first place | 2019 Moscow | Team |
Junior European Championships
| Gold medal – first place | 2018 Guadalajara | Ball |
| Gold medal – first place | 2018 Guadalajara | Ribbon |
| Gold medal – first place | 2018 Guadalajara | Team |

Lala Dmitrievna Kramarenko (Russian: Лала Дмитриевна Крамаренко, born December 6, 2004) is a Russian individual rhythmic gymnast. She is the 2019 junior world champion in ball and clubs and the 2018 European junior champion in ball and ribbon. At the 2021 European Championships, she won team gold. She is also a three-time junior national all around champion (2017-2019) and a two-time national all-around silver medalist (2020-2021).

== Personal life ==
Kramarenko was born in Moscow into a sporting family. Her father, Dmitry Kramarenko, is a retired Azerbaijani football goalkeeper and currently works as an academy coach at CSKA Moscow; her mother, Irina, was a biathlete. Her paternal grandfather is Sergey Kramarenko, a Soviet football goalkeeper. Additionally, Kramarenko's twin sister, Diana, plays tennis. She started rhythmic gymnastics together with her sister, who no longer practices the sport.

Kramarenko considers herself more of a technical gymnast.

== Career ==
=== Junior ===
Kramarenko took up rhythmic gymnastics at age three in Baku, Azerbaijan. She briefly competed for Azerbaijan in novice tournaments from 2011 to 2013. In 2014 she moved from Baku to Novogorsk to train with coach Lyaysan Savitskaya and began competing in internal Russian tournaments. In 2016, she won gold at the Championship of Moscow in the all-around.

==== 2017 ====
In the 2017 season, Kramarenko won gold in the all-around at the 2017 Russian Junior Championships in Kazan. She debuted in her first Junior Grand Prix in Moscow, where she won the all-around gold.

The next competition was at the International Tournament of Lisbon, where she won four gold medals in the all-around, hoop, ball, and clubs. Kramarenko then won gold in the all-around at the Junior Grand Prix Marbella as well as team gold (together with Polina Shmatko). May 5–7, Kramarenko competed at the 2017 Sofia Junior World Cup and won gold in the all-around; she also swept the gold medals in all four apparatus finals.

On October 12–14, Kramarenko competed with new programs and routines in preparation for the 2018 season at the "2017 Hope of Russia" where she finished 4th in the all-around behind Polina Shmatko.

On 4–6 November, Kramarenko won the all-around gold at the annual "Russian-Chinese Youth Games". She qualified to all 4 event finals, where she won bronze in the hoop and ribbon finals and silver in clubs, and she placed 9th in ball.

==== 2018 ====
On February 2–4, Kramarenko defended her title at the 2018 Russian Junior Championships, winning the gold medal ahead of Dariia Sergaeva. She also won three gold medals - team, ball and ribbon - at the Junior European Championship in Guadalajara, Spain.

==== 2019 ====
Kramarenko became the all-around champion at the Russian Junior Championships.

In July, Kramarenko won three gold medals at the 1st Junior World Championships: ball, clubs, and team all-around. She shared the team all-around gold with Dariia Sergaeva, Anastasia Simakova, Aleksandra Semibratova, Anna Batasova, Alisa Tishchenko, Amina Khaldarova, Elizaveta Koteneva and Dana Semirenko.

=== Senior ===
==== 2020 ====
Kramarenko made her senior debut at the 2020 Moscow Grand Prix, securing bronze in the individual all around competition behind Dina Averina and Daria Trubnikova. At the 2020 Russian Championships she won the all-around silver medal behind Arina Averina. Except from a few online tournaments, most of the competitions were canceled due to the COVID-19 pandemic.

==== 2021 ====
Kramarenko began her season competing in the 2021 Moscow Grand Prix, where she finished third in all around. She was registered to compete in the 2021 Sofia World Cup, along with Anastasia Simakova, but withdrew.

In May at Baku, she competed at her first senior World Cup, winning silver in hoop, bronze in clubs and in bronze in all around, behind Boryana Kaleyn. In June, Kramarenko competed in the 2021 European Championships in Varna, Bulgaria, finishing 5th in the hoop final and winning team gold with Dina and Arina Averina. In July, she competed in the 2021 Minsk World Cup Challenge, winning gold in ribbon, bronze in hoop and silver in ball and clubs. She also won silver in the all-around behind Alina Harnasko and in front of Anastasia Salos. She also competed in the 2021 Moscow World Cup Challenge, replacing Arina Averina due to injury. She won silver in all events and as well as in the all-around, behind Dina Averina and in front of Ekaterina Vedeeneva.. Irina Viner announced that Kramarenko, Daria Trubnikova and Ekaterina Selezneva would be the Olympic reserves for Dina and Arina Averina at the 2020 Olympic Games in Tokyo, Japan.

In September, Kramarenko competed at the Brno Tart Cup, where she won the all-around gold ahead of Daria Trubnikova and Irina Annenkova. She also won gold in the ball and club final, silver in the hoop final, and bronze in the ribbon final. In early October, she competed in the Moscow Olympico Cup. In mid-October she competed in the Marbella Grand Prix, where she once again won all-around gold, ahead of Viktoriia Onoprienko and Anastasia Simakova. In the apparatus finals, she won three golds along with a silver in the club final. She was again chosen as the reserve for the Averina sisters, this time for the 2021 World Championship, in Kitakyushu, Japan, which took place at the end of October.

==== 2022-2025 ====
After recovering from COVID-19, Kramarenko started her season by competing at the 2022 Moscow Grand Prix, where she won silver in the all-around, behind fellow Russian teammate Dina Averina and ahead of Arina Averina. She also won gold in the ball and clubs final and silver in the ribbon final.

At the 2022 Russian Rhythmic Gymnastics Championship, she won bronze in the all-around behind Dina and Arina Averina. A few weeks later, the FIG banned all Russian and Belarusian athletes following the Russian invasion of Ukraine. As of 2024, she and her Russian teammates could only compete in domestic competitions, which prevented them from qualifying for the 2024 Paris Olympics.

In January 2025, it was reported that Kramarenko underwent knee surgery in June 2024. According to Irina Viner, doctors mistakenly removed her healthy meniscus rather than the damaged one. However, Kramarenko’s father denied this. After her surgery, Kramarenko spent about a month undergoing rehabilitation abroad, including time spent focusing on recovery in Israel. This medical treatment and other health issues lead to uncertainty over her athletic future. In November it was announced that she is resuming her career as a competitive gymnast.

=== 2026 ===
In early February 2026, she showcased her new routines for the season at the Moscow Championships. On February 3, she obtained her neutral status.

In March, Kramarenko competed at the Russian Championships but failed to qualify for the All-Around Final due to lack of preparation time after her surgery.

== Eponymous skill ==
Kramarenko has one eponymous skill listed in the code of points, a pivot (turn on relevé) of 180 degrees from either a standing position or a seated position.

| Name | Description | Difficulty (Note: Valid for the 2022-2024 Code of Points) |
|---|---|---|
| Kramarenko | Kabaeva pivot starting from standing position (front split, trunk bent back below horizontal) with free leg bent 30 degrees | 0.5 base value |
| Kramarenko | Kramarenko pivot started from seated position | 0.6 base value |

== Routine music information ==
| Year | Apparatus | Music title |
|---|---|---|
| 2026 | Hoop | The big bang by Rock Mafia |
| 2026 | Ball | Love is a Lie by Beth Hart |
| 2026 | Clubs | Malo by Bebe |
| 2026 | Ribbon | Carol Of The Bells by Lindsey Stirling |
| 2024 | Hoop | |
| 2024 | Ball | СНЕГ by Елена Ваенга |
| 2024 | Clubs | Gitanerías (1997 Remastered) by Morton Gould and His Orchestra |
| 2024 | Ribbon | |
| 2023 | Hoop | Carmina Burana |
| 2023 | Ball | Je Suis Malade by Lara Fabian |
| 2023 | Ball (second) | Вечная любовь (feat. Tamara Gverdtsiteli) |
| 2023 | Clubs | "The Queen of Spades", by Pyotr Ilyich Tchaikovsky |
| 2023 | Ribbon(second) | La Cumparsita by Klazz Brothers & Cuba Percussion |
| 2023 | Ribbon | The Show Must Go On by Queen |
| 2022 | Hoop | "No. 14 Pas De Deux: Intrada-Variation I/II-Coda", by Pyotr Ilyich Tchaikovsky |
| 2022 | Ball | "Ne Me Quitte Pas", by Sylvie Vartan |
| 2022 | Ball (second) | "I Put a Spell on You" by Garou |
| 2022 | Clubs | "Simarik", by Tarkan |
| 2022 | Clubs (second) | "The Queen of Spades", by Pyotr Ilyich Tchaikovsky |
| 2022 | Ribbon | "Sway" by Chico & the Gypsies |
| 2022 | Ribbon (second) | "Mambo" |
| 2021 | Hoop (first) | Symphony No.4 In F Minor, Op. 36: IV. Finale-Allegro Con Fueoco by Tchaikovsky |
| 2021 | Hoop (second) | The Second Waltz by Andre Rieu |
| 2021 | Ball | Палсо была влюбляться by Rada Volshaninova |
| 2021 | Clubs | Night On Disco Mountain by David Shire |
| 2021 | Ribbon | Act 1 - Appearance Of Kitri / Act 1 - Variation: Kitri by Leon Minkus |
| 2020 | Hoop (first) | Rasputin/Rocking Son/Moskau by Dschinghis Khan |
| 2020 | Hoop (second) | Symphony No.4 In F Minor, Op. 36: IV. Finale-Allegro Con Fueoco by Tchaikovsky |
| 2020 | Ball | El Porompompero by Chico & The Gypsies |
| 2020 | Ball (second) | Палсо была влюбляться by Rada Volshaninova |
| 2020 | Clubs | Night On Disco Mountain by David Shire |
| 2020 | Ribbon (first) | Bumble Bee Boogie by Robert Wells |
| 2020 | Ribbon (second) | Act 1 - Appearance Of Kitri / Act 1 - Variation: Kitri by Leon Minkus |
| 2019 | Rope 1st cut | Simarik by Tarkan |
| 2019 | Rope 2nd cut | Strobe's Nanafushi by Kodō |
| 2019 | Ball | Syrtaki by D. Moutsis |
| 2019 | Clubs | Очи чёрные by Radmila Karaklajić |
| 2019 | Ribbon | |
| 2018 | Hoop | Cyganskaja by Marina Devyatova |
| 2018 | Ball | Vivire Paraty by Los Niños de Sara |
| 2018 | Clubs | Lament To Birch Bark by Moscow Balalaika Quartet |
| 2018 | Ribbon | Unknown remix, Give It Up (The Good Men song) by The Good Men |
| 2017 | Hoop | Snakefood by Safri Duo |
| 2017 | Ball | Don Quixote: Quiteria(Kitri) Enters by Hayden Todorov |
| 2017 | Clubs | Caucasian Dances (folk) |
| 2017 | Ribbon | Unknown remix, Give It Up (The Good Men song) by The Good Men |
| 2017 | Gala | I Will Wait for You music from Les Parapluies de Cherbourg by Michel Legrand |

== Competitive highlights ==
International: Senior
| Year | Event | AA | Team | Hoop | Ball | Clubs | Ribbon |
|---|---|---|---|---|---|---|---|
| 2021 | World Cup Moscow | 2nd | | 2nd | 2nd | 2nd | 2nd |
| 2021 | World Cup Minsk | 2nd | | 3rd | 2nd | 2nd | 1st |
| 2021 | European Championships | | 1st | 5th | | | |
| 2021 | World Cup Baku | 3rd | | 2nd | 4th | 3rd | 13th (Q) |
| 2021 | Grand Prix Moscow | 3rd | | 4th (Q) | 3rd (Q) | 3rd (Q) | 3rd (Q) |
| 2020 | Grand Prix Tartu | 2nd | | 6th | 4th (Q) | 2nd | 2nd |
| 2020 | Grand Prix Moscow | 3rd | | 6th (Q) | 3rd | 3rd (Q) | 4th (Q) |
International: Junior
| Year | Event | AA | Team | Hoop/Rope | Ball | Clubs | Ribbon |
| 2019 | World Junior Championships | | 1st | | 1st | 1st | |
| 2018 | Junior Grand Prix Final | 1st | | 1st | 1st | 1st | 1st |
| 2018 | Happy Caravan Cup | 1st | | 1st | 1st | 1st | 1st |
| 2018 | Junior World Cup Kazan | 2nd (OC) | | | | | |
| 2018 | Junior World Cup Minsk | | 1st | 2nd | | | 2nd (Q) |
| 2018 | European Junior Championships | | 1st | | 1st | | 1st |
| 2018 | Junior Grand Prix Holon | | 1st | | 2nd (Q) | | 1st |
| 2018 | Junior World Cup Guadalajara | | 1st | | 1st | | 1st |
| 2018 | Junior World Cup Baku | | 1st | 1st | | | 2nd |
| 2018 | MTM Ljubljana tournament | 1st | | 1st | 1st | 1st | 1st |
| 2018 | Junior World Cup Sofia | | 1st | 1st | | | |
| 2018 | Junior Grand Prix Moscow | | 1st | | | | |
| 2017 | Russian-Chinese Youth Games | 1st | | | | | |
| 2017 | Junior World Cup Sofia | 1st | | 1st | 1st | 1st | 1st |
| 2017 | Happy Caravan Cup | | 2nd (OC) | | 1st | | 1st |
| 2017 | Junior Grand Prix Marbella | 1st | 1st | | | | |
| 2017 | International Tournament of Lisbon | 1st | | 1st | 1st | 1st | 2nd |
| 2017 | Junior Grand Prix Moscow | 1st | | | | | |
National: Senior
| Year | Event | AA | Team | Hoop | Ball | Clubs | Ribbon |
| 2024 | Russian Championships | 1st | | | | | |
| 2023 | Russian Championships | 3rd | | | | | |
| 2022 | Russian Championships | 3rd | 1st | 2nd | 1st | 2nd | 2nd |
| 2021 | Russian Championships | 2nd | 1st | 2nd | | | 1st |
| 2020 | Russian Championships | 2nd | 1st | | | | |
National: Junior
| Year | Event | AA | Team | Hoop | Rope | Ball | Clubs |
| 2019 | Russian Junior Championships | 1st | | | | | |
| 2018 | Russian Junior Championships | 1st | | | | | |
| 2017 | Russian Junior Championships | 1st | | | | | |
Q = Qualifications (Did not advance to Event Final due to the 2 gymnast per country rule, only Top 8 highest score); WD = Withdrew; NT = No Team Competition; OC/HC = Out of Competition(competed but scores not counted for qualifications/results)
