= Dariia Sergaeva =

Russian rhythmic gymnast

- Full name: Dariia Pavlovna Sergaeva
- Alternative name: Dariya Sergaeva
- Nickname: Dasha
- Born: December 11, 2004 (age 21) Nizhny Novgorod, Nizhny Novgorod Oblast, Russia

Gymnastics career
- Discipline: Rhythmic gymnastics
- Country represented: Russia (2017-2022)
- Club: Gazprom
- Gym: Novogorsk
- Head coach: Irina Viner
- Assistant coach: Natalia Tishina
- Retired: January 2023
Medal record
International gymnastics competitions
Event	1st	2nd	3rd
Junior World Championships	2	0	0
Total	2	0	0
Representing Russia
Rhythmic Gymnastics
Junior World Championships
Gold medal – first place	2019 Moscow	Team
Gold medal – first place	2019 Moscow	Ribbon

Daria Pavlovna Sergaeva (Russian: Дария Павловна Сергаева, born December 11, 2004, in Nizhny Novgorod, Russia) is a retired Russian individual rhythmic gymnast. She is the Junior Rhythmic Gymnastics World champion of the ribbon apparatus (2019), and a three-time Russian Junior all-around medalist.

== Personal life ==
She is the daughter of Tatyana Vladislavovna Sergaeva (born 1969), honored coach of Russia and head coach of the Russian national rhythmic gymnastics team since 2025. Daria has one sister Nataliia, retired rhythmic gymnast, who works as a coach in Italy. Her grandma is Natalia Borisovna Tishina, honored Master of Sports of the USSR (1969) and honored coach of Russia.

== Career ==
=== Junior ===
Sergaeva began training rhythmic gymnastics at the Nizhny Novgorod Regional Olympic Reserve, she is coached by her grandmother Natalia Borisovna Tishina, who is an honored rhythmic gymnastics coach for the Russian federation.

Sergaeva is a fan favorite along with Lala Kramarenko for fans of Russian Rhythmic Gymnastics . Sergaeva is known by fans for her groovy style of dancing, upbeat choice of music, her charismatic personality and facial expressions that show in her performances. She is famous for her Ghost Busters 2018-19 ribbon routine that impressed fans over social media with her fluidity and personality in the routine.

In 2017 season, Sergaeva won bronze in the all-around (tied with Anna Sokolova) at the 2017 Russian Junior Championships. At the Junior Grand Prix Marbella, Sergaeva finished 5th in the all-around and won silver in Team (RUS Team 2). She then competed at the Junior Grand Prix Brno finishing 4th in the all-around. In October 12–14, Sergaeva won silver in the all-around at the "2017 Hope of Russia". On November 4–6, Sergaeva competed at the annual "Russian-Chinese Youth Games" where she won silver in all-around behind Lala Kramarenko.

In both 2018 & 2019, Sergaeva improved on her 2017 result by winning silver at the Russian Junior Championships behind Lala Kramarenko in the All-around

In July 2019, Sergaeva won the ribbon event gold medal for the 1st Junior World Championships in Moscow, Russia. Her iconic “Ghost Busters” routine put her in first place despite rolling her ankle during the routine.

=== Senior ===
In February 2020, Sergaeva debuted as a Senior at the International Tournament in Moscow, Russia and took part in the All Around scoring a total of (Hoop: 22.500, Ball: 20.300, Clubs: 21.350, Ribbon: 19.700) 83.850. In March, Sergaeva took part in the All Around Russian Championships (Nationals).

In 2021, Sergaeva won gold in the All Around for the International Rhythmic Gymnastics Tournament (IRGT) in Moscow, Russia (Hoop: 26.100, Ball: 25.300, Clubs: 25.250, Ribbon: 20.850) with a total of 97.500, she has improved significantly since last year. In March, Sergaeva took part in the All Around Russian Championships and scored 95.850, placing 8th.

She retired in 2022.

== Routine music information ==
Year	Apparatus	Music title
2021	Hoop	Beggin' by Madcon
2021	Ball	Sloppy Soup Samba by Daniel Pemberton
2021	Clubs	Kill This Love by Blackpink
2021	Ribbon	Felt Boots by Valenki
2021	Gala	No Time to Die by Billie Eilish
2020	Hoop	Beggin' by Madcon
2020	Ball	U-Boats by Alexandre Desplat
2020	Clubs	Kill This Love by Blackpink
2020	Ribbon	Felt Boots by Valenki
2019	Rope	ты мне нравишься-9724 (I Like You-9724) by Muslim Magomayev
2019	Ball	Cabaret Opening by Benoît Charest, Lina Boudraut, Mary-Lou Gauthier, Béatrice Bonifassi
2019	Clubs	The End of October by Brady Arnold
2019	Ribbon	Ghostbusters by Ray Parker Jr.
2018	Hoop	Ritonare by Cirque du Soleil
2018	Ball	Where Are Ü Now by Justin Bieber
2018	Clubs	The End Of October by Brady Arnold
2018	Ribbon	Wolf Pack by Bachar Mar-Khalifé
2017	Hoop	"Escape from East Berlin"(Dave Heath with bass flute), Take You Down by Daniel Pemberton
2017	Ball	Where Are Ü Now by Justin Bieber
2017	Clubs	"Hi" music by Psapp
2017	Ribbon	Winter by Bond

Sergaeva is known for her upbeat choice of music. Most famously her 2018-19 ribbon routine- Ghost Busters.

== Competitive highlights ==
International: Senior
Year	Event	AA	Team	Hoop	Ball	Clubs	Ribbon
2021	International Tournament Moscow	1st
International: Junior
Year	Event	AA	Team	Hoop/Rope	Ball	Clubs	Ribbon
2019	World Junior Championships		1st				1st
2018	Junior Grand Prix Moscow		1st
2017	Russian-Chinese Youth Games	2nd
2017	Junior Grand Prix Brno	4th			1st
2017	Junior Grand Prix Marbella	5th	2nd
National: Senior
Year	Event	AA	Team	Hoop	Ball	Clubs	Ribbon
2021	Russian Championships	8th	3rd			6th
National: Junior
Year	Event	AA	Team	Hoop	Rope	Ball	Clubs
2019	Russian Junior Championships	2nd
2018	Russian Junior Championships	2nd
2017	Russian Junior Championships	3rd
Q = Qualifications (Did not advance to Event Final due to the 2 gymnast per country rule, only Top 8 highest score); WD = Withdrew; NT = No Team Competition
