= Gymnastics at the 2000 Commonwealth Youth Games =

Gymnastics at the I Commonwealth Youth Games
- Dates: 10 – 14 August
- Host city: Edinburgh, Scotland
- Venue: Meadowbank Sports Centre
- Events: 17 (12 Artistic, 5 Rhythmic)
- Participation: 40 (12 boys, 28 girls) athletes from 7 nations

At the 2000 Commonwealth Youth Games, the gymnastics events were held at Meadowbank Sports Centre in Edinburgh, Scotland from 10 to 14 August. The boys competed in Artistic Gymnastics under the categories All Round, Floor, Pommel Horse, Rings, Vault, Parallel Bars and Horizontal Bar. The girls competed in Artistic Gymnastics under the categories All round, Vault, Beam, Uneven Bar and Floor. Rhythmic Gymnastics was open to girls only, and held events in All Around, Rope, Hoop, Ball and Ribbon.

== Medal table ==
* Host nation ( SCO)

Rank	Nation	Gold	Silver	Bronze	Total
1	ENG	10	3	4	17
2	AUS	4	9	4	17
3	SCO*	2	1	3	6
4	MAS	1	2	3	6
5	RSA	0	0	2	2
Totals (5 entries)		17	15	16	48

== Artistic ==
=== Men's Events ===
Event	Gold	Silver	Bronze
Individual all-around	(Malaysia) Ng Shu Wai 50.050	(Australia) Gerard Donnelly 49.550	(Malaysia) Onn Kwang Tung 49.150
Floor exercise	(England) Ryan Bradley 9.000	(Scotland) Craig Barry 8.933	(South Africa) Lindsay Adams 8.233
Horizontal bar	(Australia) Gerard Donnelly 8.867	(Malaysia) Ng Shu Wai 8.833	(South Africa) Lindsay Adams 8.167
Parallel bars	(England) R.Bradley 8.500	(England) Bruce Dennison 8.400	(Australia) Gerard Donnelly 8.233
Pommel horse	(England) Bruce Dennison 9.100	(Malaysia) Onn Kwang Tung 8.900	(Australia) Gerard Donnelly 8.633
Rings	(England) Bruce Dennison 8.233	(Australia) Gerard Donnelly 8.033	(Australia) Trent Thompson 7.933
Vault	(Scotland) Craig Barry 8.767	(Malaysia) Ng Shu Wai 8.717	(England) R.Bradley 8.600

=== Women's Events ===
Event	Gold	Silver	Bronze
Individual all-around	(England) Beth Tweddle 36.738	(Australia) Danielle Kelly 36.243	(Australia) Jessica White 35.969
Vault	(Scotland) Georgia Campbell 9.810	(England) Beth Tweddle 8.869	(South Africa) Tamaryn Schultz 8.675
Uneven bars	(England) Beth Tweddle 9.450	(Australia) Danielle Kelly 9.250	(England) Rebecca Mason 9.238
Balance Beam	(Australia) Danielle Kelly 9.075	(Australia) Jessica White 8.912	(Malaysia) A.Yen 8.375
Floor exercise	(Australia) Danielle Kelly 9.488	(Australia) Jessica White 9.475	(England) Beth Tweddle 9.188

== Rhythmic ==
Event	Gold	Silver	Bronze
Individual all-around	(England) Rebecca Jose 76.655	(Australia) Bree Robertson 75.250	(Scotland) Michelle Denholm 73.330
Ball	(England) Rebecca Jose 19.033	(Australia) Bree Robertson 18.683	(Scotland) Michelle Denholm 18.225
Rope	(Australia) Bree Robertson 18.871	(England) Rebecca Jose 18.808	(Scotland) Michelle Denholm 18.525
Hoop	(England) Rebecca Jose 19.008	(Australia) Bree Robertson 18.717	(Malaysia) J.Ong 18.433
Ribbon	(Australia) Bree Robertson 18.667 (England) Rebecca Jose 18.677		(England) Hannah McKibbin 18.383
