= Women's gymnastics in Australia =

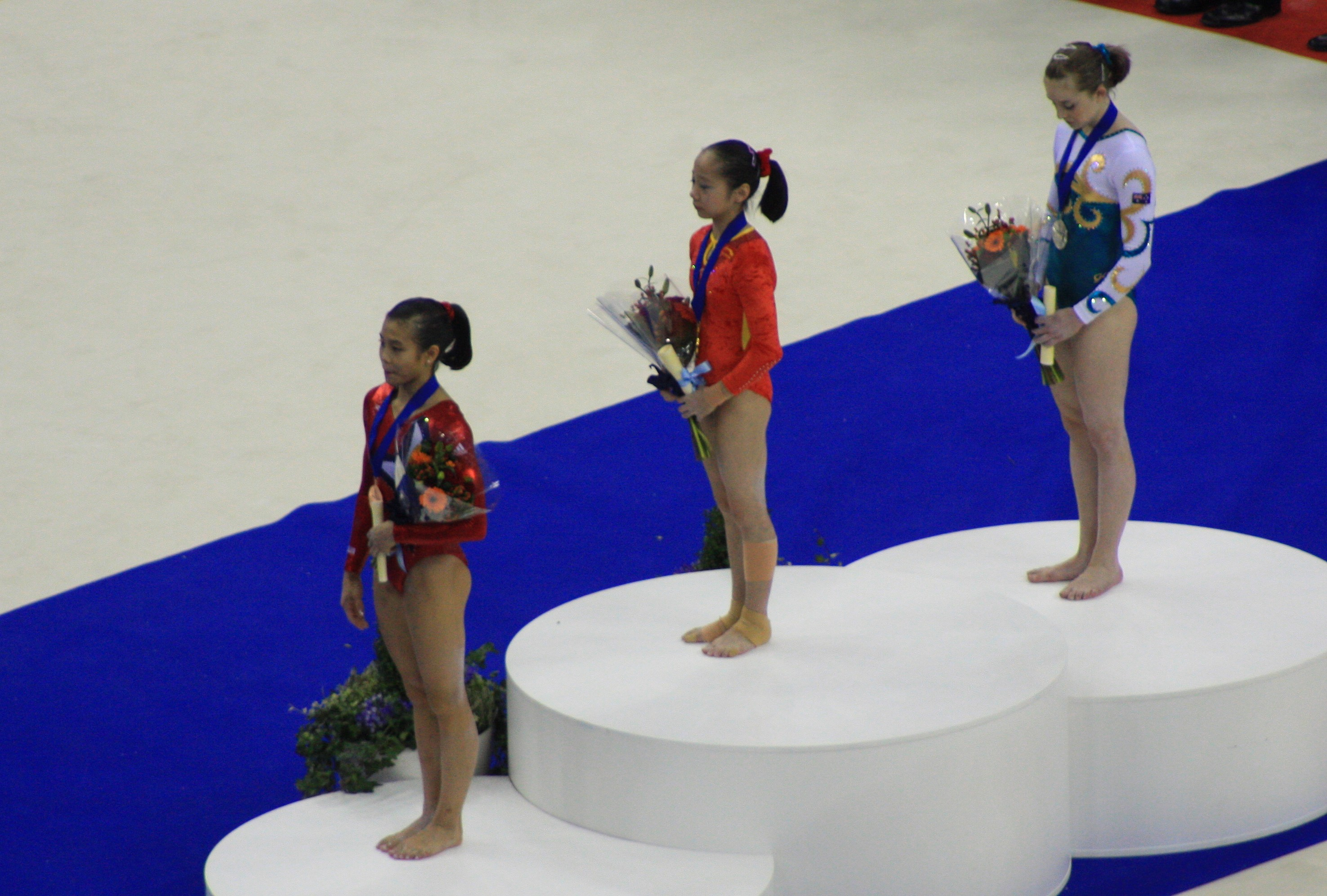
- Podium of the beam at the 2009 World Artistic Gymnastics Championships. From left to right on the podium: Ivana Hong (USA, 3rd place), Deng Linlin (China, 1st place) and Lauren Mitchell (Australia, 2nd place).
- Country: Australia
- Governing body: Gymnastics Australia
- National team: Australia

== History ==
While not being urged to avoid competition, women had few opportunities to compete in sport in Australia until the 1880s. After that date, new sporting facilities were being built around the country and many new sport clubs were created. At the turn of the century, gymnastics was a popular sport for girls at religious schools because it was not a game and competition was not a major aspect of the sport. It helped reinforce traditional gender roles. One of the early schools in Australia to offer gymnastics for women was the Brisbane Girls' Grammar and the All Hallows' Convent school for girls. During the 1900s in Australia, this sport became more socially acceptable to participate in.

Australian women's sports had an advantage over many other women's sport organisations around the world in the period after World War II. Women's sport organisations had largely remained intact and were holding competitions during the war period. This structure survived in the post war period. Women's sport were not hurt because of food rationing, petrol rationing, population disbursement, and other issues facing post-war Europe.

== Participation ==
In 1984, there were 32,157 registered female artistic gymnasts in the country. The first national women's championship was held in 1959, 9 years after the first men's national championship.

== Notable competitors ==
Monique Allen is one of Australia's most famous female gymnasts. She earned a scholarship for gymnastics at the Australian Institute of Sport in 1984. At the 1989 world championships, she finished 25th overall . She went on to win an individual all around silver medal at the 1990 Commonwealth Games. Lisa Skinner and Trudy McIntosh won gold medals in gymnastics at the 1998 Commonwealth Games. Allana Slater also won a gold medal at the games. She was the first Australian woman to be ranked as one of the top-ten all around gymnasts in the world. Bree Robertson is an artistic gymnast who won a silver medal as an individual at the 1998 Commonwealth Games in the ribbon final, text event.

Monette Russo made Australian history by becoming the first Australian gymnast ever to win an individual World Championship medal at the 2005 Melbourne Artistic Gymnastics World Championships when she came third in the all-around competition.

Lauren Mitchell won the World Championships for floor in 2010 and the 2009 World Championships silver medalist on balance beam and floor. Mitchell is only the second Australian woman gymnast to win medals at a World Championships, and the first to win gold. Both Russo and Mitchell were coached by Peggy Liddick, the former coach of USA champion, Shannon Miller, and current National Coach of the Australian Women's Team.

== See also ==
- Australia women's national gymnastics team
- Australia at the World Artistic Gymnastics Championships
- Australian female artistic gymnasts
- Australian gymnasts

== Bibliography ==
- Howell, Max; Howell, Reet; Brown, David W. (1989). The Sporting Image, A pictorial history of Queenslanders at play. Brisbane: University of Queensland Press. ISBN 0-7022-2206-2.
