= Hannah McKibbin =

British rhythmic gymnast

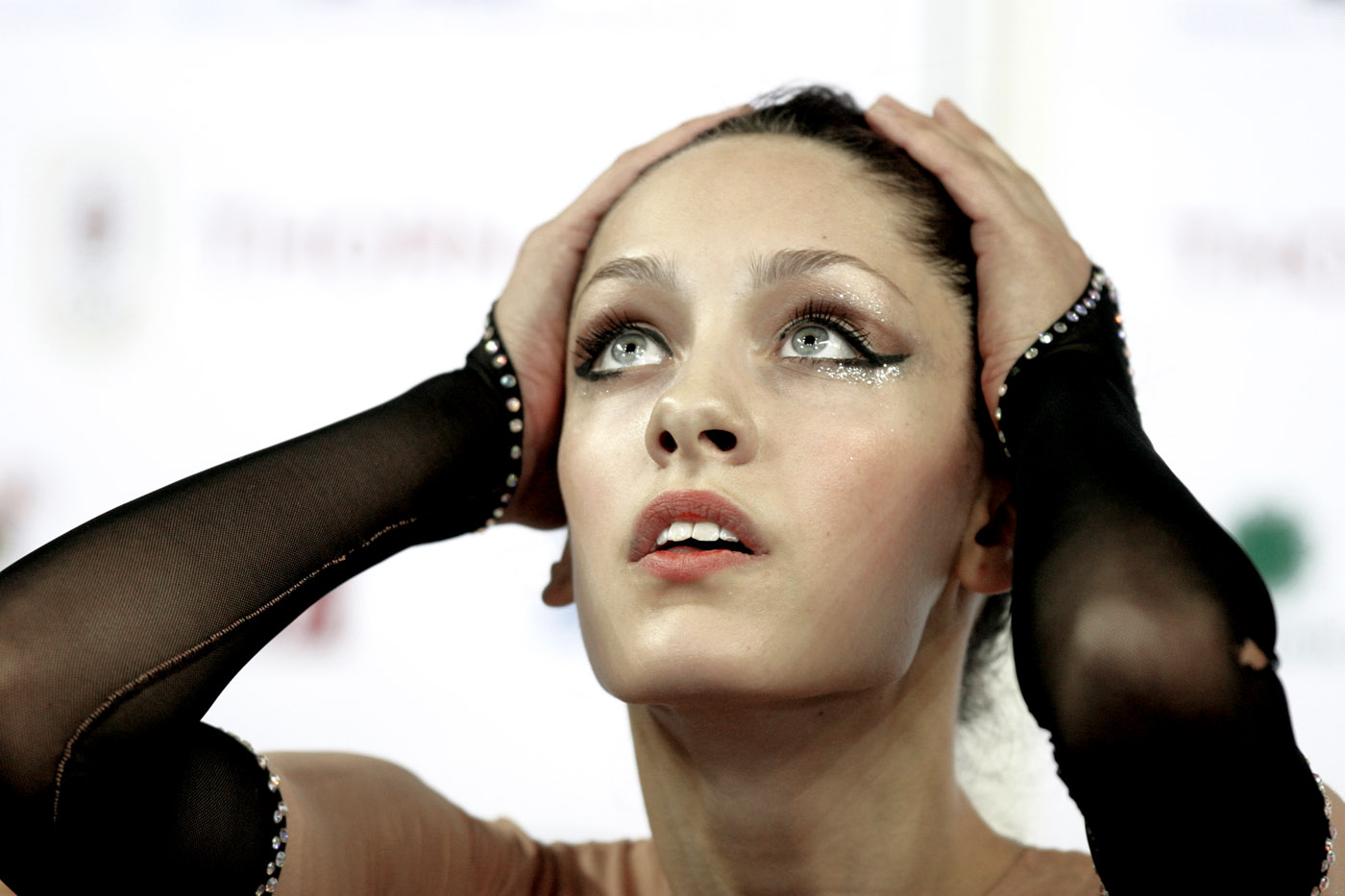
- McKibbin at GR World championship. Budapest 24-28/09/2003

Personal information
- Born: 7 August 1985 (age 41) London
- Height: 178 cm (5 ft 10 in)

Gymnastics career
- Discipline: Rhythmic gymnastics
- Country represented: Great Britain; (2001–2004 (?))
- Club: Spelthorne
- Head coach: Savina Gueorgieva
- Retired: yes
Medal record
Representing England
Commonwealth Rhythmic Gymnastics Championships
Gold medal – first place	2002 Slough	All-Around
Gold medal – first place	2002 Slough	Hoop
Gold medal – first place	2002 Slough	Clubs
Silver medal – second place	2002 Slough	Rope
Silver medal – second place	2002 Slough	Ball
Commonwealth Youth Games
Bronze medal – third place	2000 Edinburgh	Ribbon

Hannah McKibbin (born 7 August 1985) is a retired British individual rhythmic gymnast. She represented her nation at international competitions.

She participated at the 2004 Summer Olympics in Athens. She also competed at world championships, including at the 2001 and 2003 World Rhythmic Gymnastics Championships. She had her highest placement finishing 14th in All-around at the 2001 World Championships in Madrid, Spain.
