= Commonwealth Rhythmic Gymnastics Championships =

The Commonwealth Rhythmic Gymnastics Championships were held in conjunction with the 2002 Commonwealth Games since the sport not included in the Commonwealth Games programme.

The championships took place in Slough, England on 18–21 April 2002. The participating nations were:

- Australia
- Canada
- Cyprus
- England
- Namibia
- New Zealand
- Northern Ireland
- Scotland
- South Africa
- Wales

== Medalists ==
Event	Gold	Silver	Bronze
Team	England; Rachel Ennis; Rebecca Jose; Hannah McKibbin; Jackie Steinke	Australia	
All-Around	(England) Hannah McKibbin	(England) Rebecca Jose	
Rope	(England) Rebecca Jose		
Hoop	(England) Hannah McKibbin		
Ball	(England) Rebecca Jose		
Clubs	(England) Hannah McKibbin		
