= Lyaysan Savitskaya =

Russian gymnastics coach

- Born: December 7, 1972 (age 53); Kazan, RSFSR, USSR
- Occupation: Rhythmic Gymnastics coach
- Known for: Russian rhythmic gymnastics trainer
- Children: 2

Lyaysan Savitskaya (Russian: Ляйсан Савицкая; born December 7, 1972, in Krasnodar, RSFSR, Soviet Union) is an honored Master of Sports coach of Russia in Rhythmic gymnastics.

== Coaching career ==
Savitskaya has a degree in higher physical education and completed her degree at the Kuban State University of Physical Education, Sport and Tourism. She also works as a gym teacher at Grammar school 4 No 9 in Kazan.

== Notable students ==
- Lala Kramarenko - 2018 European Junior Ball and Ribbon champion, two-time Russian Junior National all-around champion
- Polina Shmatko - 2016 European Junior Clubs and Ball champion, 2018 European Junior Hoop champion
- Sofia Nikeeva
