= Daria Trubnikova =

Russian rhythmic gymnast

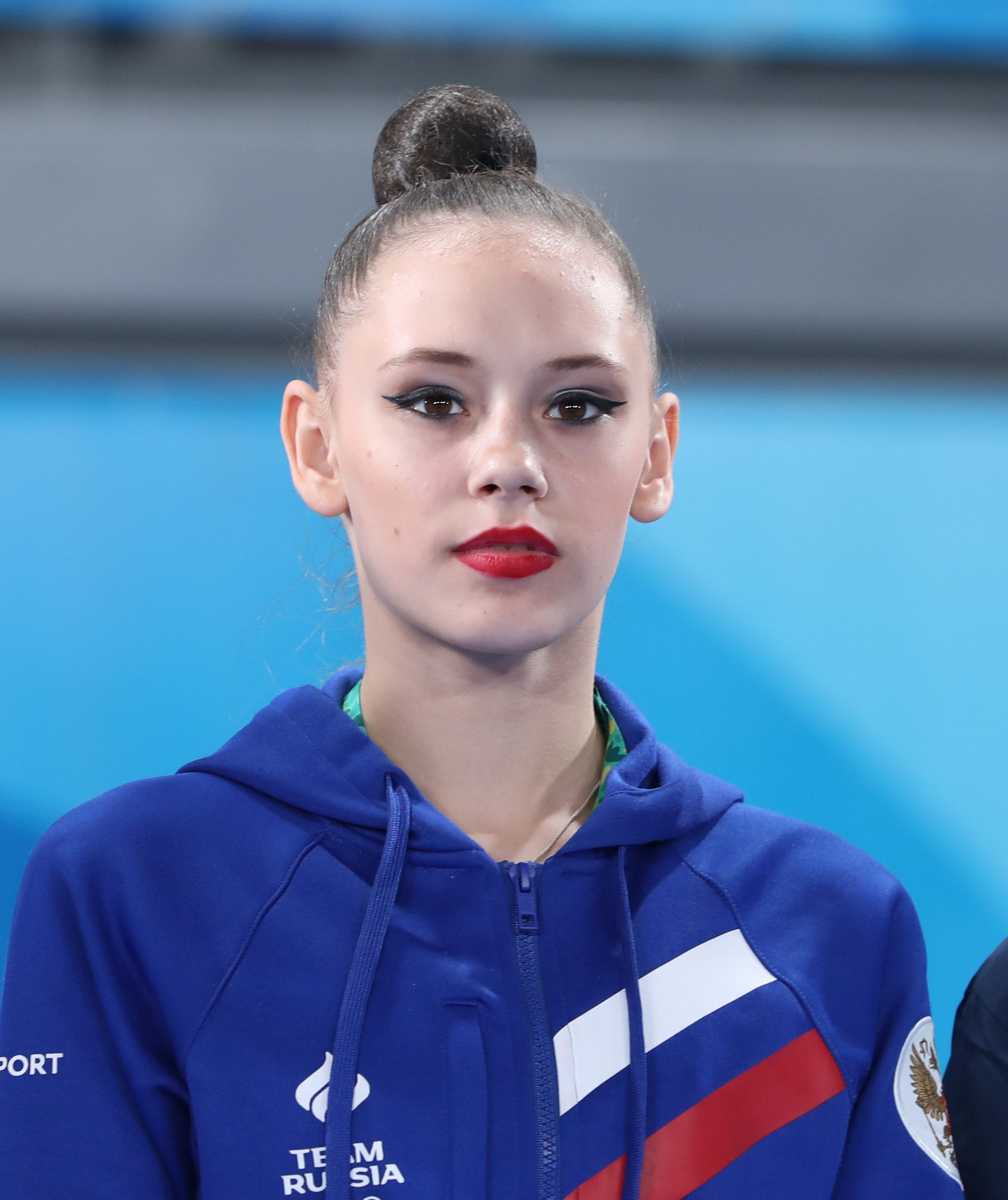
- Daria Trubnikova at the 2018 Summer Youth Olympics

Personal information
- Full name: Daria Sergeyevna Trubnikova
- Nickname: Dasha
- Born: 1 January 2003 (age 23) Tambov, Russia
- Height: 162 cm (5 ft 4 in)

Gymnastics career
- Discipline: Rhythmic gymnastics
- Country represented: Russia (2016–2022)
- Club: Gazprom
- Gym: Novogorsk
- Head coach: Irina Viner
- Assistant coach: Amina Zaripova
- Former coaches: Ekaterina Pankova, Elena Karpushenko
- Eponymous skills: The Trubnikova: Side split without support, trunk side at horizontal, passing to front split, trunk bent back below horizontal.
- Retired: 6 January 2023
Medal record
Representing Russia
Rhythmic Gymnastics
Youth Olympic Games
Gold medal – first place	2018 Buenos Aires	Individual
Junior European Championships
Gold medal – first place	2018 Guadalajara	Clubs
Gold medal – first place	2018 Guadalajara	Team
Grand Prix Final
Gold medal – first place	2019 Brno	All-Around
Representing (International Olympic Committee) Mixed-NOCs
Youth Olympic Games
Gold medal – first place	2018 Buenos Aires	Mixed team

Daria Sergeyevna Trubnikova (Russian: Дарья Сергеевна Трубникова; born 1 January 2003) is a retired Russian individual rhythmic gymnast. She is the 2018 Youth Olympic Games individual all-around champion, the 2018 European Junior Clubs and Team champion, the 2019 Grand Prix Final all-around gold medallist and the 2021 World Cup Baku all-around gold medallist. On the national level, she is the 2018 Russian Junior all-around bronze medalist. In January 2023, Trubnikova announced her retirement.

== Career ==
=== Junior ===
Daria Trubnikova was born in Tambov on 1 January 2003. She began training in rhythmic gymnastics at age six. Trubnikova competed at the 2018 Rhythmic Gymnastics European Championships, where she won gold in the clubs and team events. At the 2018 Summer Youth Olympics, Trubnikova won the rhythmic gymnastics all-around title ahead of Ukrainian gymnast Khrystyna Pohranychna and Italian gymnast Talisa Torretti. It was the third consecutive victory in rhythmic gymnastics at the Youth Olympic Games by a Russian gymnast.

=== Senior ===
At the 2019 Moscow Grand Prix, Trubnikova won the gold all-round medal ahead of Arina Averina, also of Russia. At the 2019 Brno Grand Prix Final, Trubnikova was the gold medallist in the all-around, ahead of Arina Averina and Katrin Taseva. Trubnikova also competed at the 2020 Moscow Grand Prix, where she won the silver all-around medal behind compatriot Dina Averina and ahead of Lala Kramarenko. She also won gold in the clubs final.

In 2021, she was selected for the Russian national team after placing in the top 8 at the national championships. She won the gold medal ahead of Boryana Kaleyn and Lala Kramarenko in the all-around at the World Cup Baku. At the same event, she won the silver medal in ball. In the 2021 Minsk World Challenge Cup, she finished in 5th place in the all-around, behind Nicol Zelikman from Israel. Later that year, Irina Viner announced that Trubnikova, Lala Kramarenko and Ekaterina Selezneva would be the Olympic reserves for Dina and Arina Averina at the Olympic Games in Tokyo 2021. Trubnikova also competed in the Brno Grand Prix, where she took silver in the all-around ahead of Irina Annenkova and behind Lala Kramarenko. She also won the gold in hoop and another silver medal in ribbon. In October she competed in the Cluj Napoca World Cup Challenge, where she won the full bronze behind Boryana Kaleyn and Milena Baldassarri. In the apparatus finals, she obtained bronze in hoop and clubs, silver in ball, and 4th place in ribbon.

== Eponymous skill ==
Trubnikova had one eponymous skill listed in the code of points, a turn from side split to a front split with back bend. It was removed when the code was updated for 2025.

Name	Description	Difficulty (Note: Valid for the 2022-2024 Code of Points)
Trubnikova	Pivot 180 passing from side split without help, trunk horizontal to front split trunk bent back below horizontal	0.7

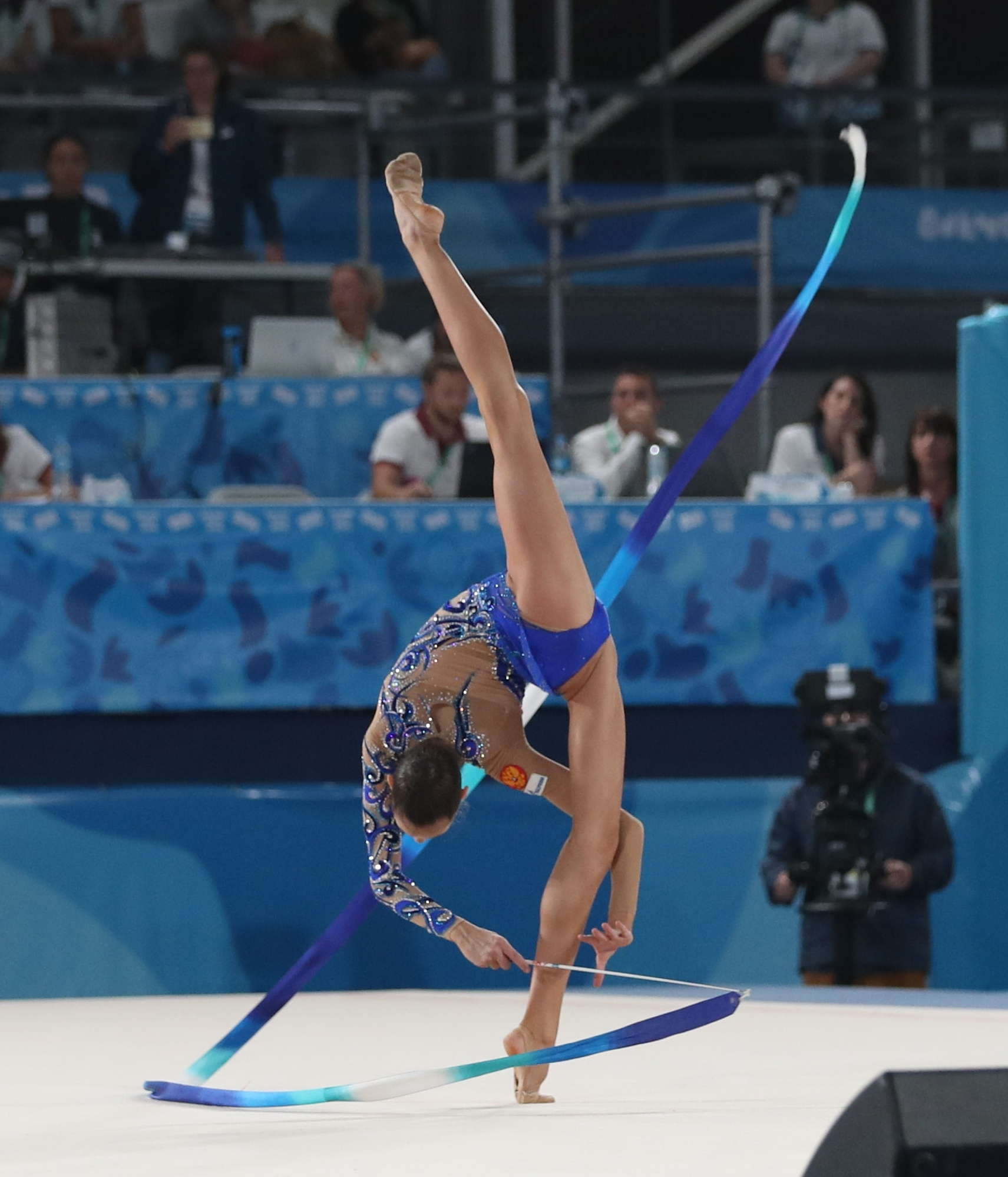
Trubnikova performing her eponymous move at the 2018 Youth Olympics

Both the side split and the front split positions were required to be completed within 180 degrees of rotation.

== Routine music information ==
Year	Apparatus	Music title
2021	Hoop	"La Forza del Destino (Overture)", by The London Pops Orchestra, composed by Giuseppe Verdi
2021	Ball	"Filiae maestae Jerusalem, RV 638: II. Sileant Zephyri" composed by Antonio Vivaldi
2021	Clubs	"Runaway Baby" by Bruno Mars
2021	Ribbon	"And The Waltz Goes On", by Andre Rieu, composed by Antony Hopkins
2020	Hoop	"La Forza del Destino (Overture)", by The London Pops Orchestra, composed by Giuseppe Verdi
2020	Ball	"Nature Boy", by Eva Mattes & Danny Malando
2020	Clubs (first)	"Rama Lama Bang Bang", by Roisin Murphy
2020	Clubs (second)	The Dirty Boogie by The Brian Setzer Orchestra
2020	Ribbon (first)	music from The Story of Voyages, composed by Alfred Shnitke
2020	Ribbon (second)	"And The Waltz Goes On", by Andre Rieu, composed by Antony Hopkins
2019	Hoop	Giselle (Retour des Vendangeurs, Valse, Waltz) by CSR Symphony Orchestra
2019	Ball	Nature Boy by Eva Mattes & Danny Malando
2019	Clubs 1st cut	Ojos Así (Live from Paris) by Shakira
2019	Clubs 2nd cut	I Wanna Dance by Artem Uzunov
2019	Clubs 3rd cut	Саратовские переборы by Ансамбль Новгородская Мозаика
2019	Clubs 4th cut	Tritsch-Tratsch-Polka by Johnn Strauss II
2019	Ribbon 1st cut	La donna è mobile by José Carreras
2019	Ribbon 2nd cut	The Dirty Boogie by The Brian Setzer Orchestra
2018	Hoop	Libiamo ne' lieti calici by Luciano Pavarotti
2018	Ball	Steppe by René Aubry
2018	Clubs	Delicado, Tico Tico by Raul Di Blasio
2018	Ribbon	For Mama by Matt Monro
2017	Hoop	
2017	Ball	Steppe by René Aubry
2017	Clubs	
2017	Ribbon	
2016	Hoop	
2016	Ball	
2016	Clubs	Hafanana by Valery Leontiev
2016	Rope	
2015	Hoop	Песня о Медведях de Alsou
2015	Ball	
2015	Clubs	Hafanana by Valery Leontiev
2015	Rope	
