= Bree Robertson =

Australian rhythmic gymnast

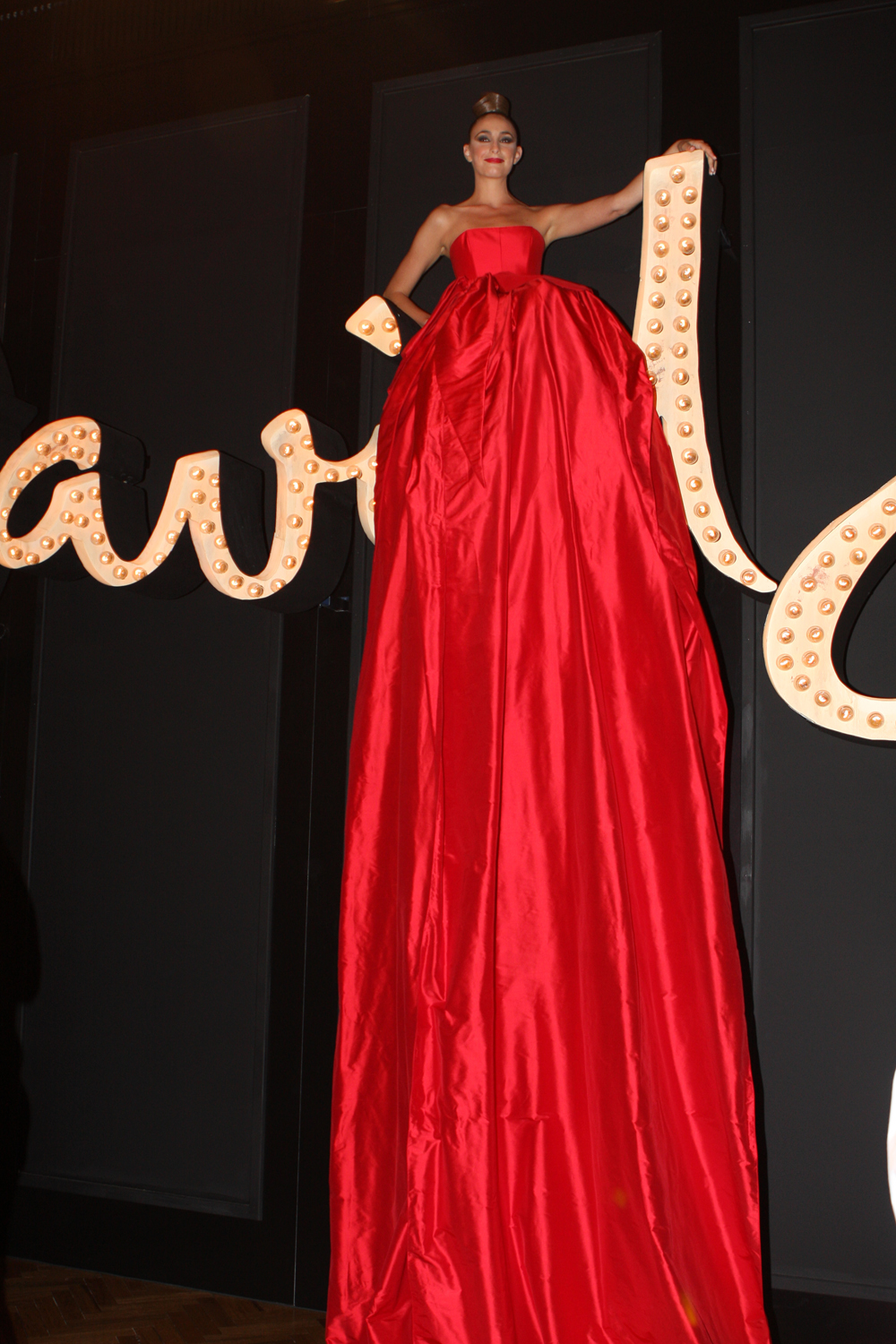

Personal information
- Born: 6 July 1982 (age 44) Gosford
- Height: 178 cm (5 ft 10 in)

Gymnastics career
- Discipline: Rhythmic gymnastics
- Country represented: Australia
- Head coach: Delia Halmu
- Retired: 2003
Medal record
Representing Australia
Commonwealth Youth Games
Gold medal – first place	2000 Edinburgh	Ribbon
Gold medal – first place	2000 Edinburgh	Rope
Gold medal – first place	2000 Edinburgh	Team
Silver medal – second place	2000 Edinburgh	All-around
Silver medal – second place	2000 Edinburgh	Hoop
Silver medal – second place	2000 Edinburgh	Ball
Four Continents Championships
Bronze medal – third place	1997 Sydney	Group

Bree Rakowski (née Robertson, born 6 July 1982) is a model, contortionist and actress who represented Australia in rhythmic gymnastics and was one of the country's top elite international gymnasts.

Robertson, who was born in Gosford, New South Wales, and is, often referred to as Australia's leading contortionist, performs around the world at high-profile events. She appeared in America's Next Top Model, Cycle 11, in 2008, teaching the model contestants about extreme posing.

== Gymnastics career ==
Robertson was the first Australian individual rhythmic gymnast to ever win a medal in Europe. She did this at the 1999 Julietta Shishmanova Grand Prix in Bourgas, Bulgaria.

Bree represented Australia at the 1999 World Championships in Osaka, Japan and won 3 gold and 3 silver medals at the Commonwealth Youth Games held in Edinburgh, Scotland in 2000 making her the most decorated Australian athlete of the Games across all sports.

Bree was named an Australian sporting legend in the book Legends – A Celebration of Australian Women in Sport alongside athletes including Cathy Freeman, Dawn Fraser and Susie O'Neill.
