= Clubs (rhythmic gymnastics) =

Apparatus in rhythmic gymnastics

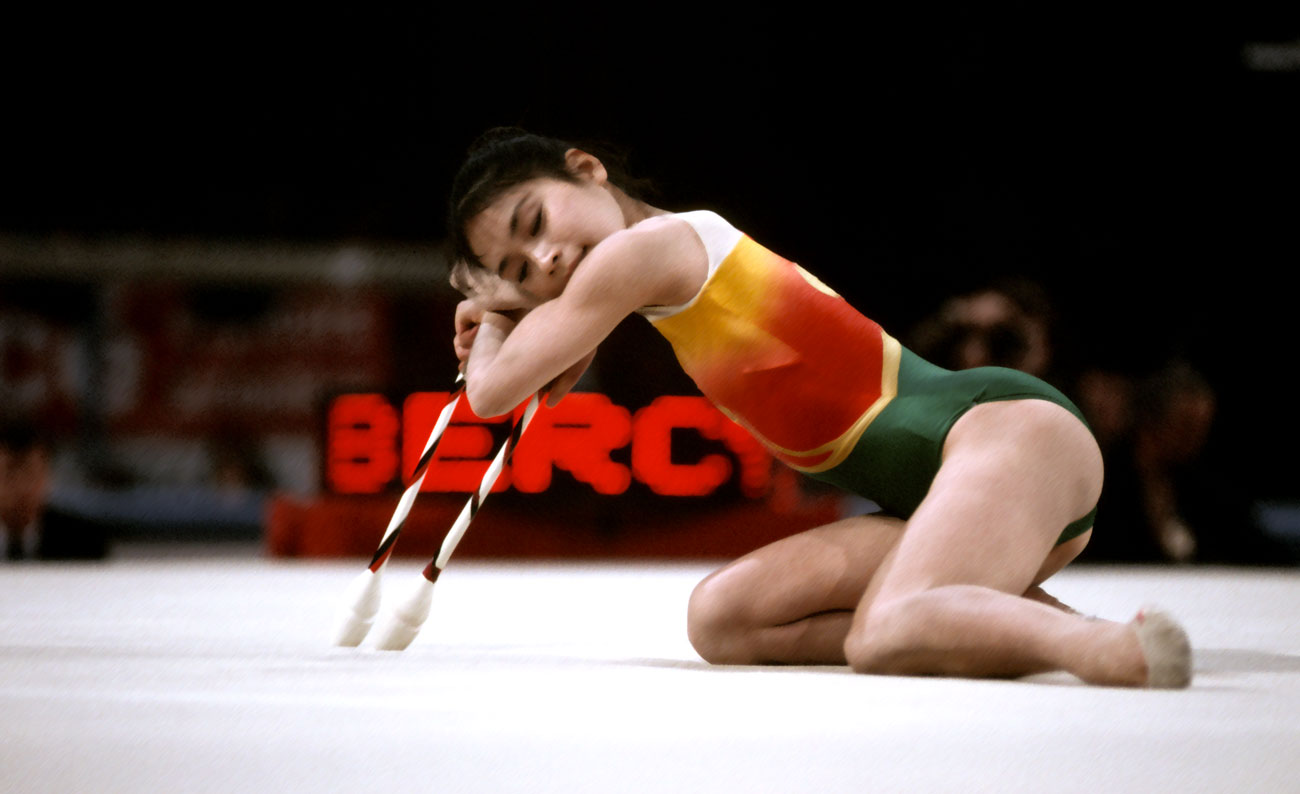
Erika Akiyama performing with clubs in 1988

The clubs are an apparatus used in the sport of rhythmic gymnastics. They are one of the five apparatuses utilized in this discipline, alongside the ball, hoop, ribbon, and rope.

== History ==
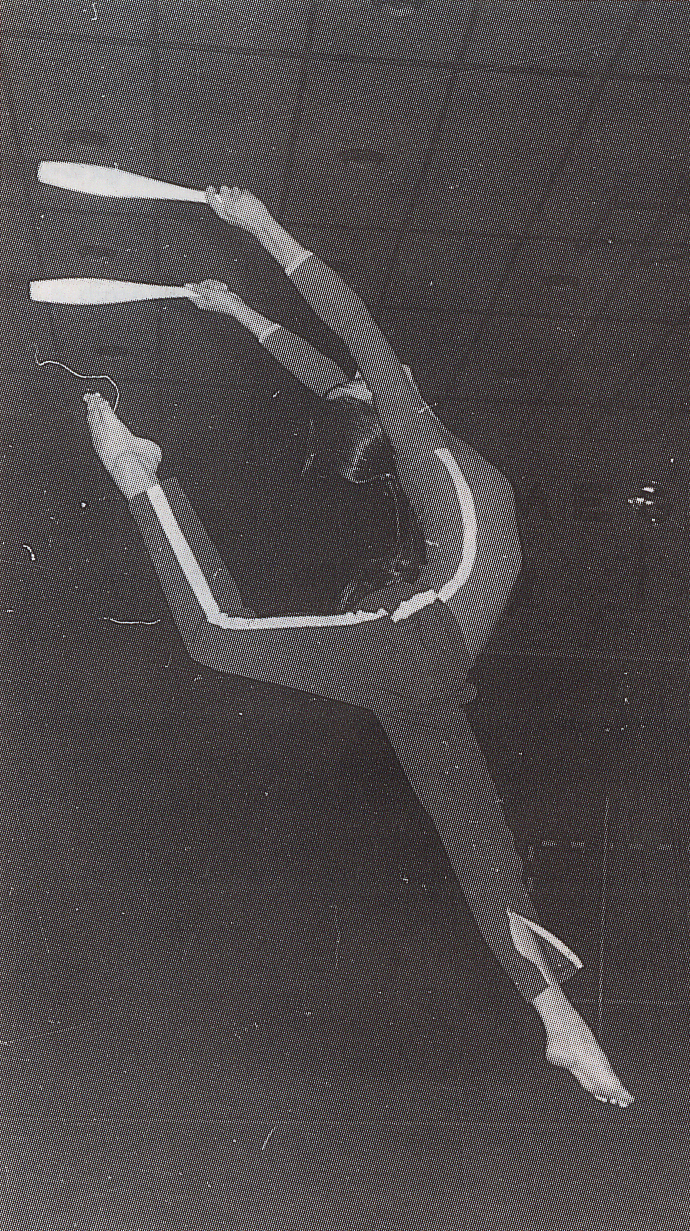
Concha Corrales training with an older style of clubs in 1973

Georges Demenÿ introduced wooden sticks with balls on the end for use in his exercises. At the same time, Indian clubs became popular equipment in Western gymnastics. Early clubs varied in shape from wires with balls on the ends to clubs more similar to juggling clubs. Over time, the clubs became lighter and thinner with a smaller and more defined head. In 1928, they were first used in competition in Hungary, and at the 1938 World Artistic Gymnastics Championships, a group clubs routine was included as an event.

They were used in the team portable apparatus competitions for women at both the 1952 and 1956 Olympics before the event was discontinued. Clubs became an official rhythmic gymnastics apparatus in 1973. From 2001-2012, each apparatus had a compulsory body group of movements that had to predominate in the exercise; for clubs, this was balance elements.

== Specifications and technique ==
Clubs may be made of wood or of synthetic materials. They may be of any colors and may be decorated. The official specifications for the clubs are as follows:

- Length: 400–500 mm
- Weight: At least 150g

The clubs can be joined together with the small end of one club inserted into the head of the other. While the gymnast may grip the clubs in any way or work with both clubs held in one hand, during the exercise, the clubs should primarily be held by the small end with one in either hand. The need to use the clubs with both hands at the same time and perform asymmetrical movements with them is the main difficulty of the apparatus. They are also more difficult to catch after a throw than the other apparatuses because their rotational planes are unstable.

== Elements ==
A gymnast performs several elements with her clubs: mills followed by a variety of three small throws (Elzhana Taniyeva)

Gymnasts perform a variety of elements with the clubs, including throwing one or both clubs into the air, balancing a club on a small part of the body or on the other club, and moving the clubs in circles. The elements that are considered to be particular to the clubs are:

- Mills: Swinging the head of the clubs in small circles a number of times, with one circle delayed behind the other, alternating between crossed and uncrossed hands each time
- Rotations:
  - Freely rotating one or both clubs around a body part or the other club
  - Tapping the clubs against each other or the floor
  - Sliding the club over at least two large body segments (e.g. along both arms)
- Small throw and catch of both clubs with at least one full circle of rotation in the air, either simultaneous or alternating
- Small throw with the clubs connected to each other
- Asymmetric movements of the two clubs
- Rolling the clubs over the body or the floor
- Small circles of each club, either simultaneous or alternating
- A series of at least three small circles with one club

== Photo gallery ==
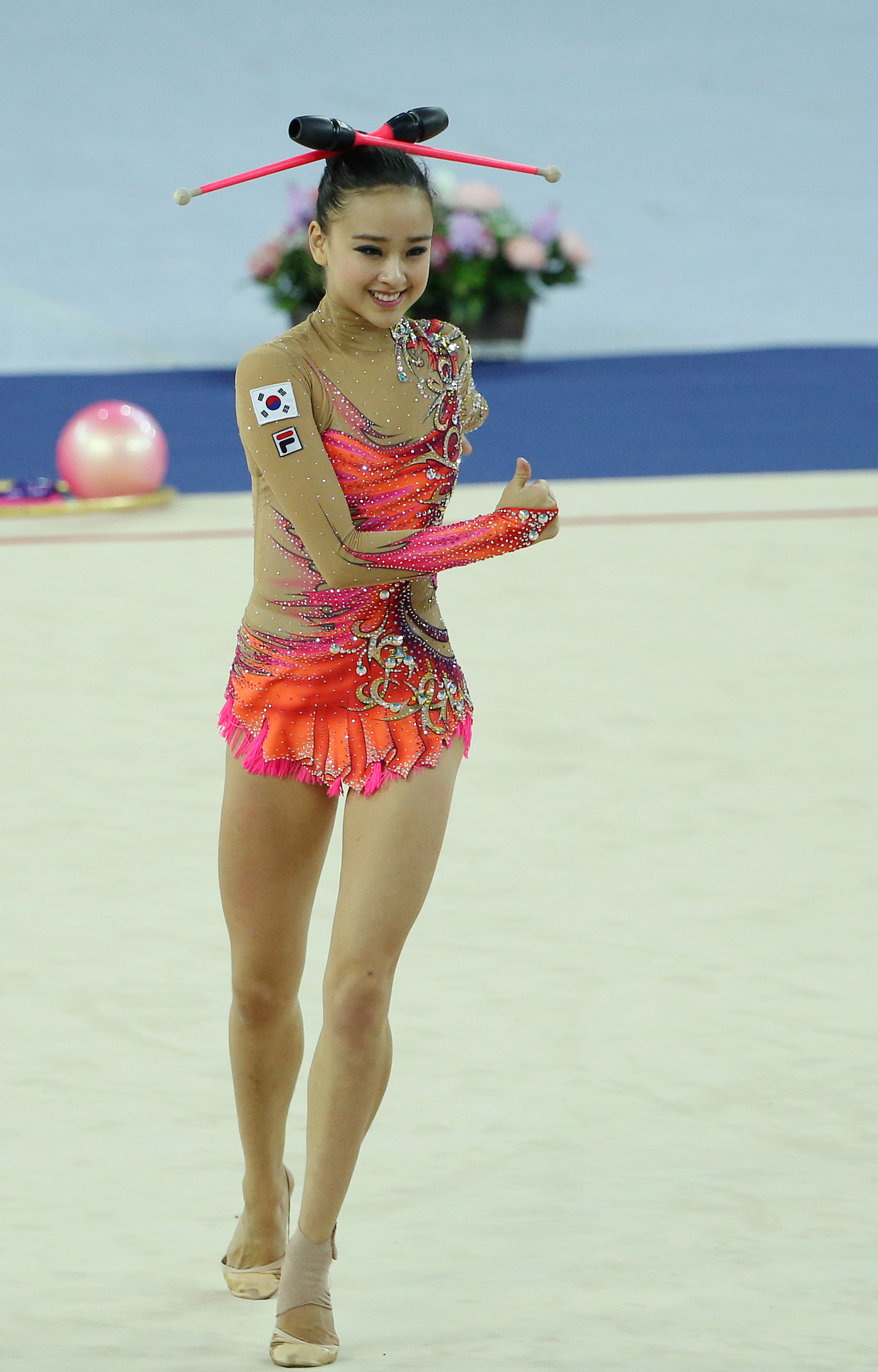
Balancing both clubs on top of the head (Son Yeon Jae)

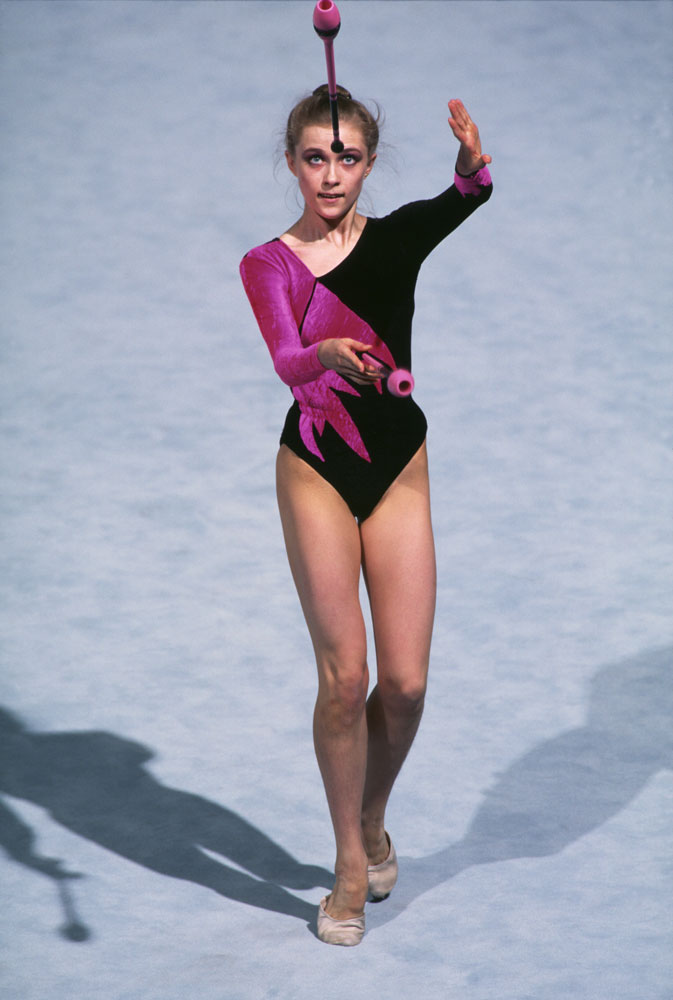
Throwing one club (Oksana Kostina)

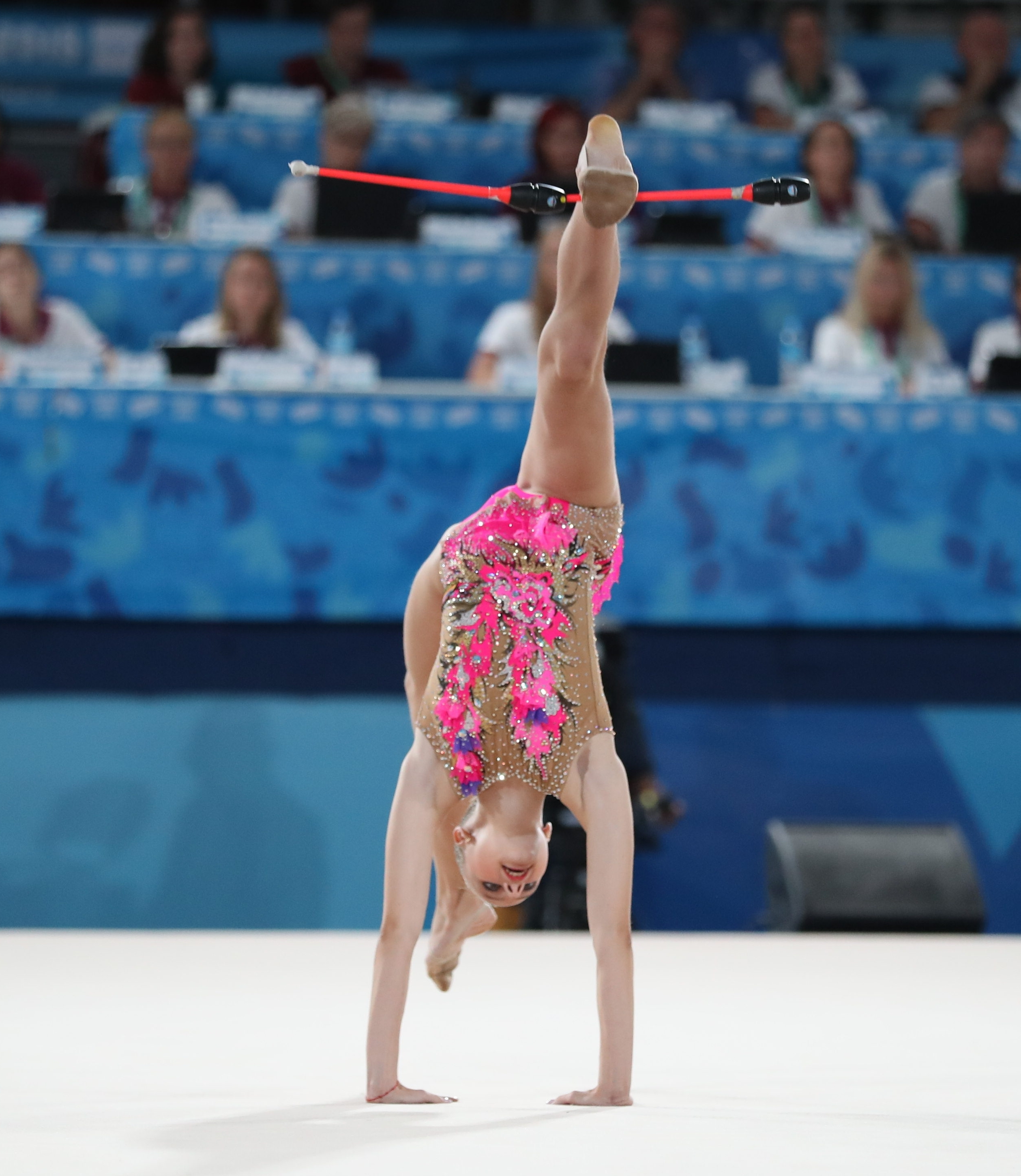
Holding connected clubs with one foot during a walkover (Yulia Vodopyanova)

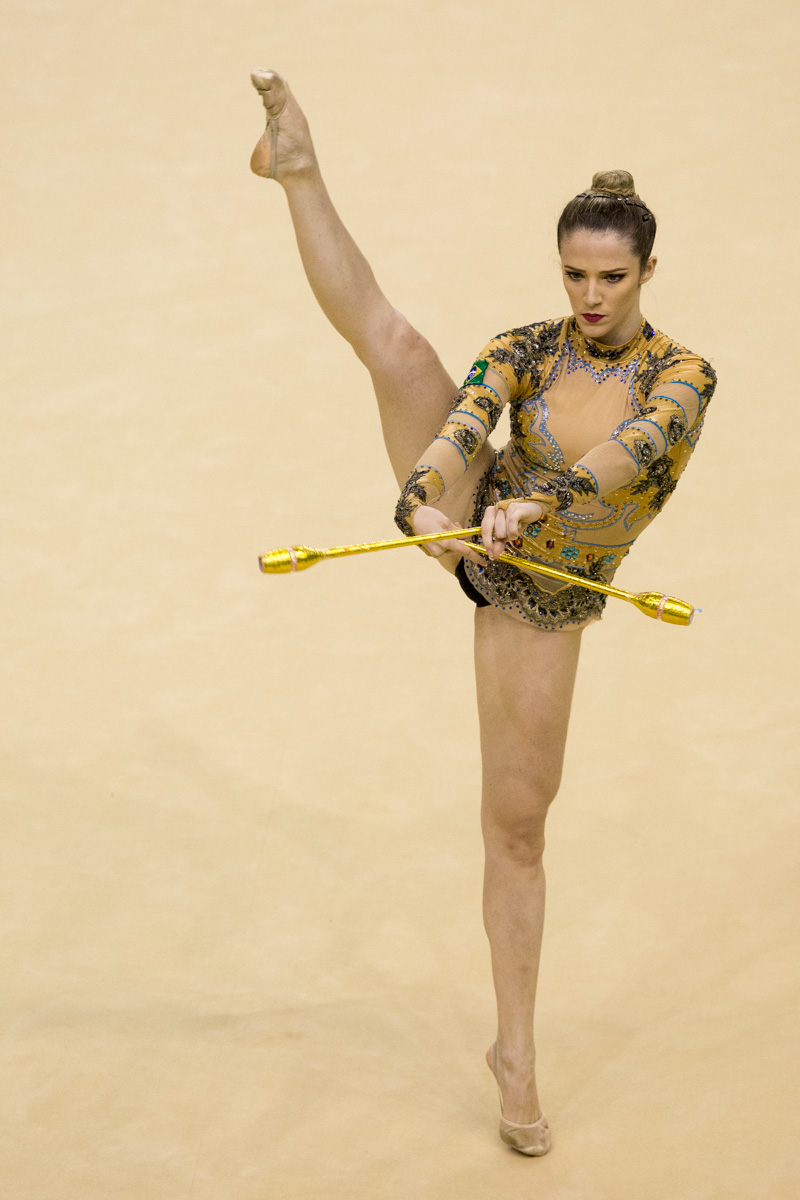
Mills (Natália Gaudio)

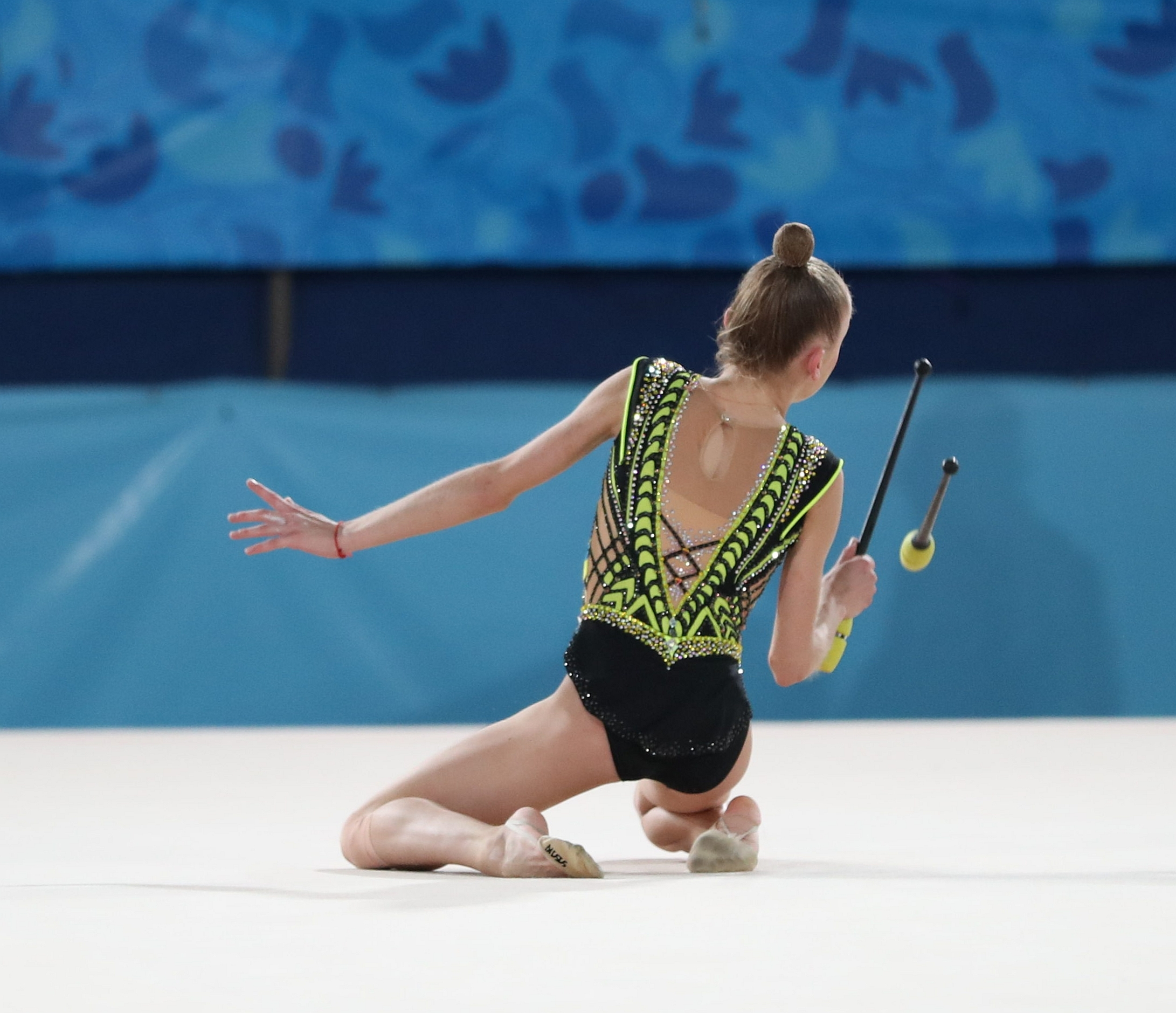
Using one club to catch the other against the floor (Khrystyna Pohranychna)
