= Rope (rhythmic gymnastics) =

Performing apparatus

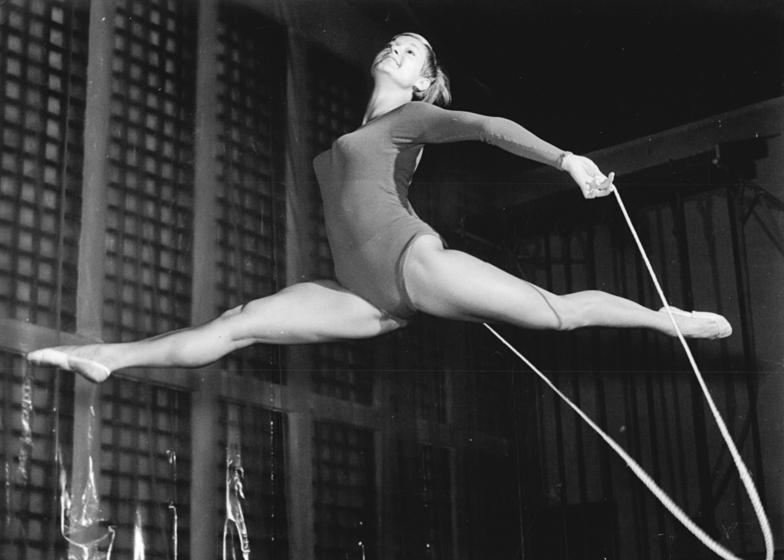
A gymnast training with rope in 1967

The rope is an apparatus used in the sport of rhythmic gymnastics. It is one of the five apparatuses utilized in this discipline, alongside the ball, clubs, hoop, and ribbon. While previously used at both the senior and junior level and in both individual and group exercises, the rope has been mostly phased out of usage and is now only used in the junior group exercises in some years.

== History ==
Jump ropes were used in some "modern gymnastics" (the precursor to modern rhythmic gymnastics) programs. The International Gymnastics Federation (FIG) considered several types of rope before adopting plain hemp ropes with no handles. It was one of the original official apparatuses along with the ball and hoop. From 2001-2012, each apparatus had a compulsory body group of movements that had to predominate in the exercise; for rope, this was jumps and leaps.

The rope is still used in junior group exercises in some years, but at the individual level, it is generally not competed. However, the code of points still allows for it to be used at local competitions. The reason given by the FIG for its retirement is that it was not as visually appealing as the other four apparatuses.

== Specifications and technique ==
The rope may be made of hemp or a similar synthetic material. Its length is in proportion to the size of the gymnast. The rope should, when held down by the feet, reach both of the gymnasts' armpits. At the ends, there may be one or two knots and an anti-slip material to help the gymnast hold on, but there should be no handles. The middle may be reinforced. It may be any color, but bright ones are preferred.

It may be used open or folded. However, the basic rope technique is considered to be holding it open with one end in each hand to perform jumps and hops of various kinds and in different directions. While elements such as rebounding the robe, spinning the ends, and wrapping it around body parts are allowed, they should be a minimal part of the exercise. Throwing the rope is difficult because it does not keep its shape well in the air, and to do so the gymnast must throw both ends with the same acceleration.

== Elements ==
Gymnasts perform a variety of elements with the rope, including skipping over it, throwing it, and hanging it from the body while balancing or turning. The elements that are considered to be particular to the rope are:

- Releasing and catching one end of the rope or rotating one end of the rope while holding the other
- Catching the open rope from a high throw with one end in each hand
- Rotations:
  - Rotating the length of the rope while it is folded in half, thirds, or quarters
  - Rotating the rope around a body part
  - Rotating the rope while it is outstretched
  - Rotating the ends of the rope while the middle is held
- Passing the body or part of the body through a turning rope
- A series of jumps with the rope turning in various directions
- Wrapping or unwrapping the rope around body parts

== Photo gallery ==
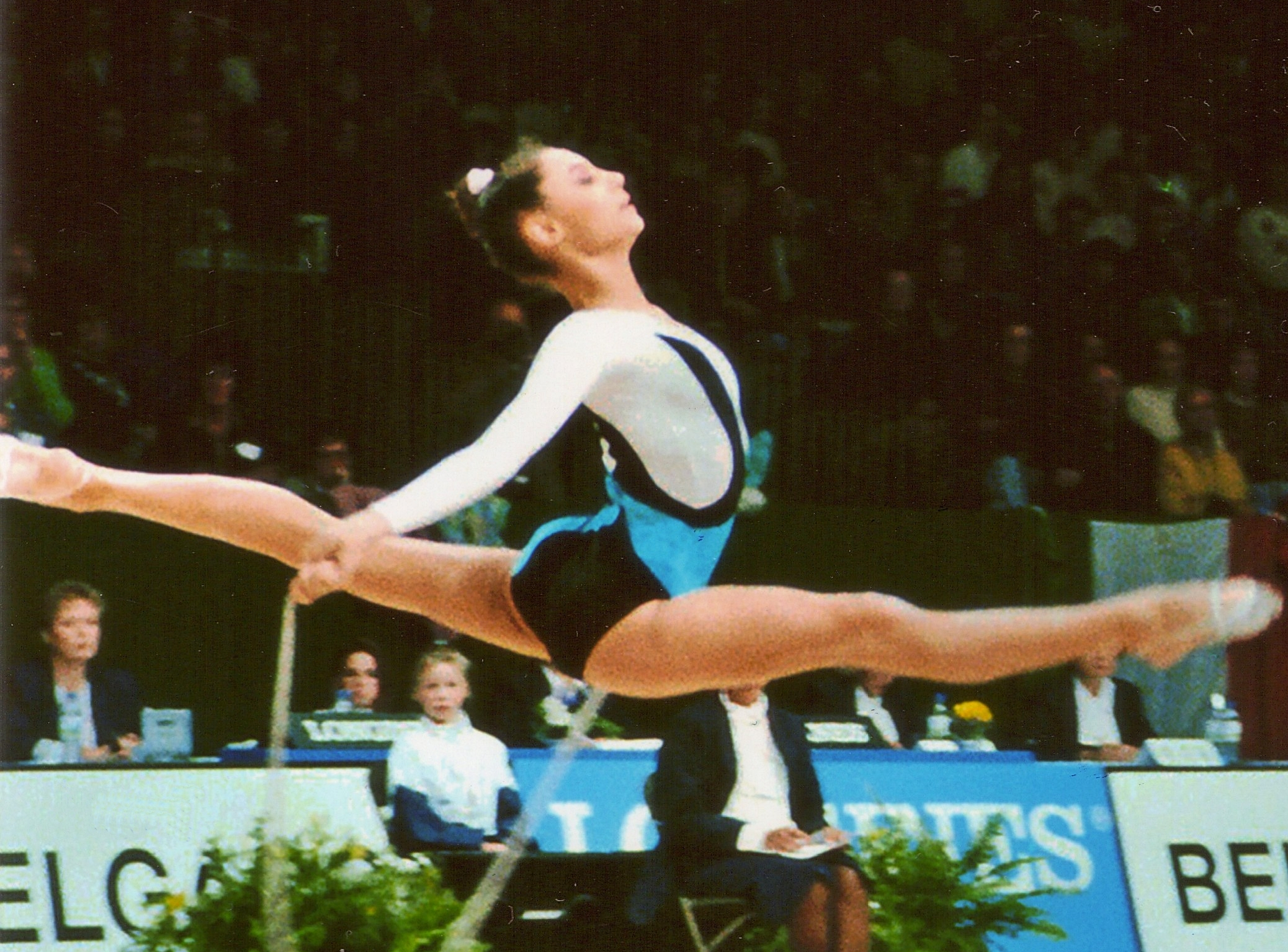
Jumping over the rope (Amaya Cardeñoso)

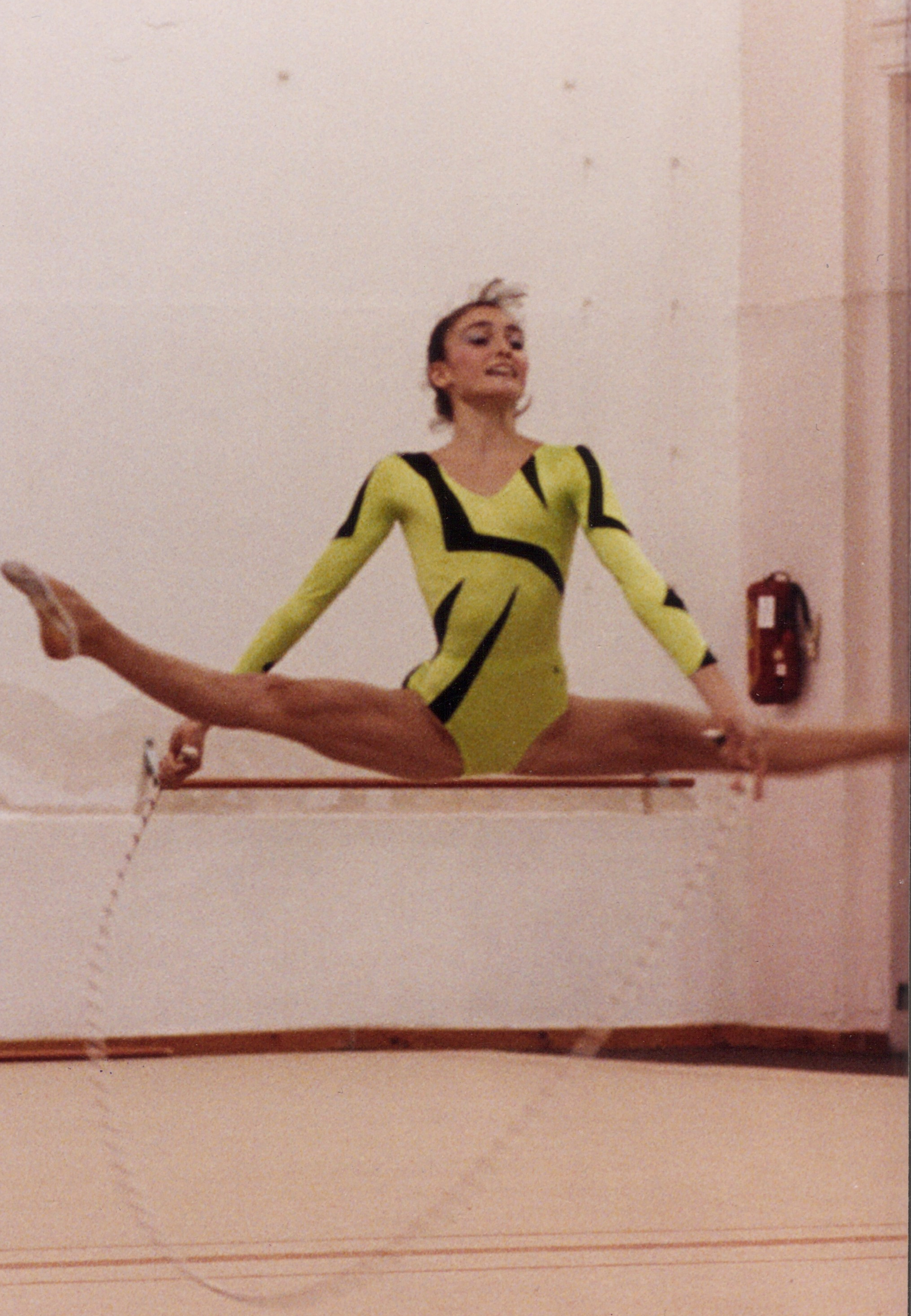
Jumping over the rope sideways (Noelia Fernández (gymnast))

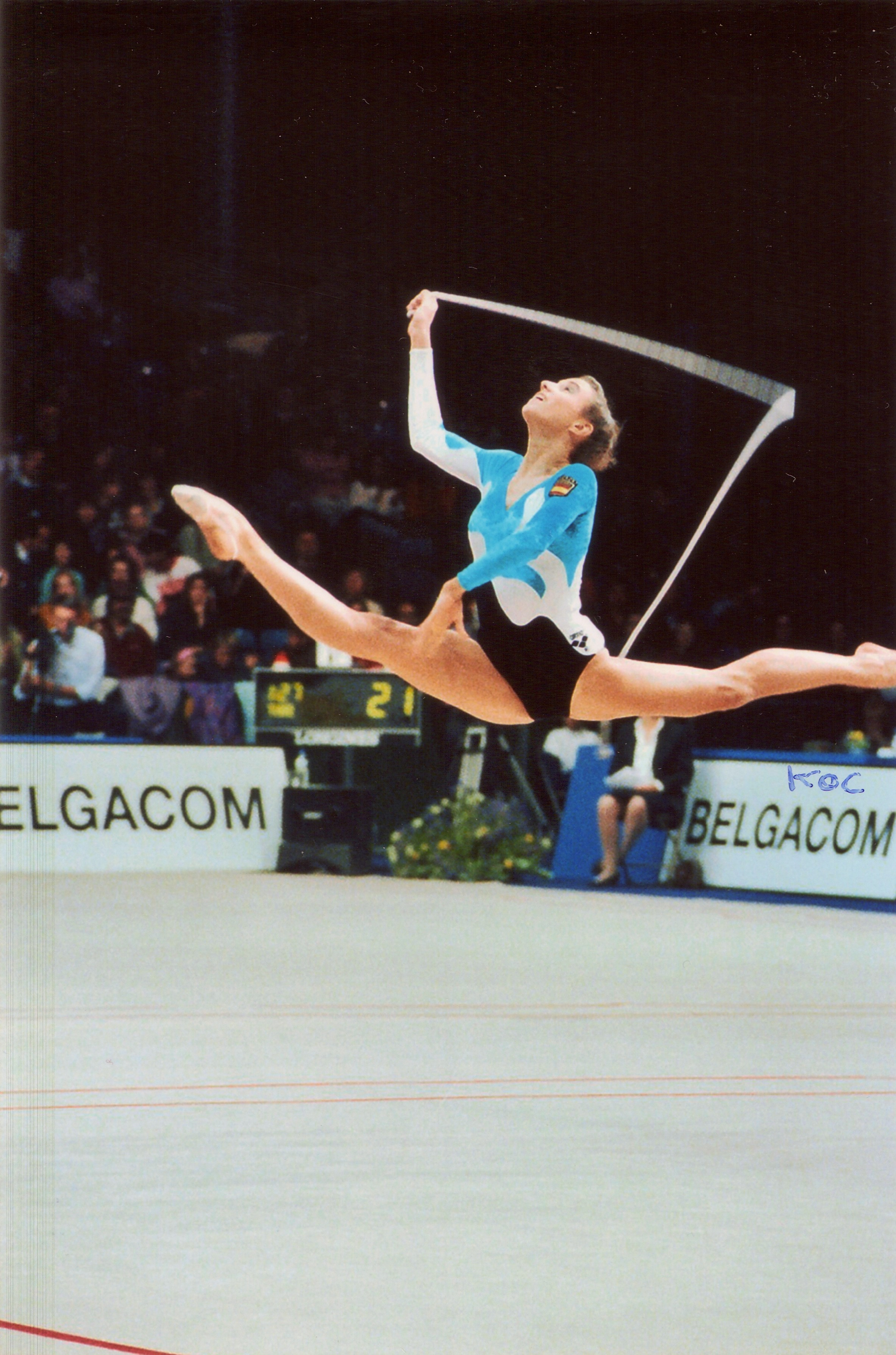
Swinging one end of the rope during a split leap (Carmen Acedo)

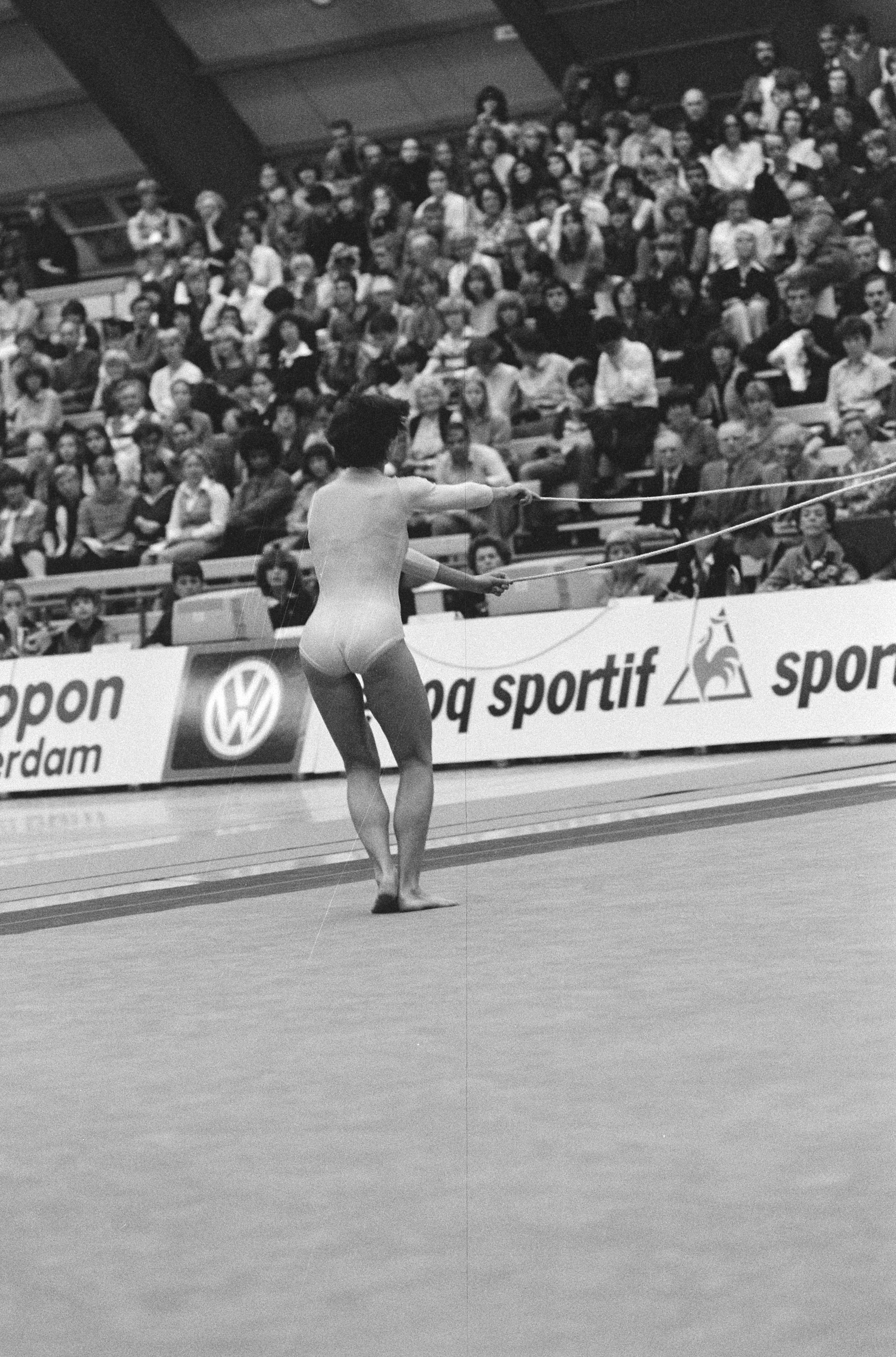
Swinging the rope while holding both ends (Zuzana Záveská)

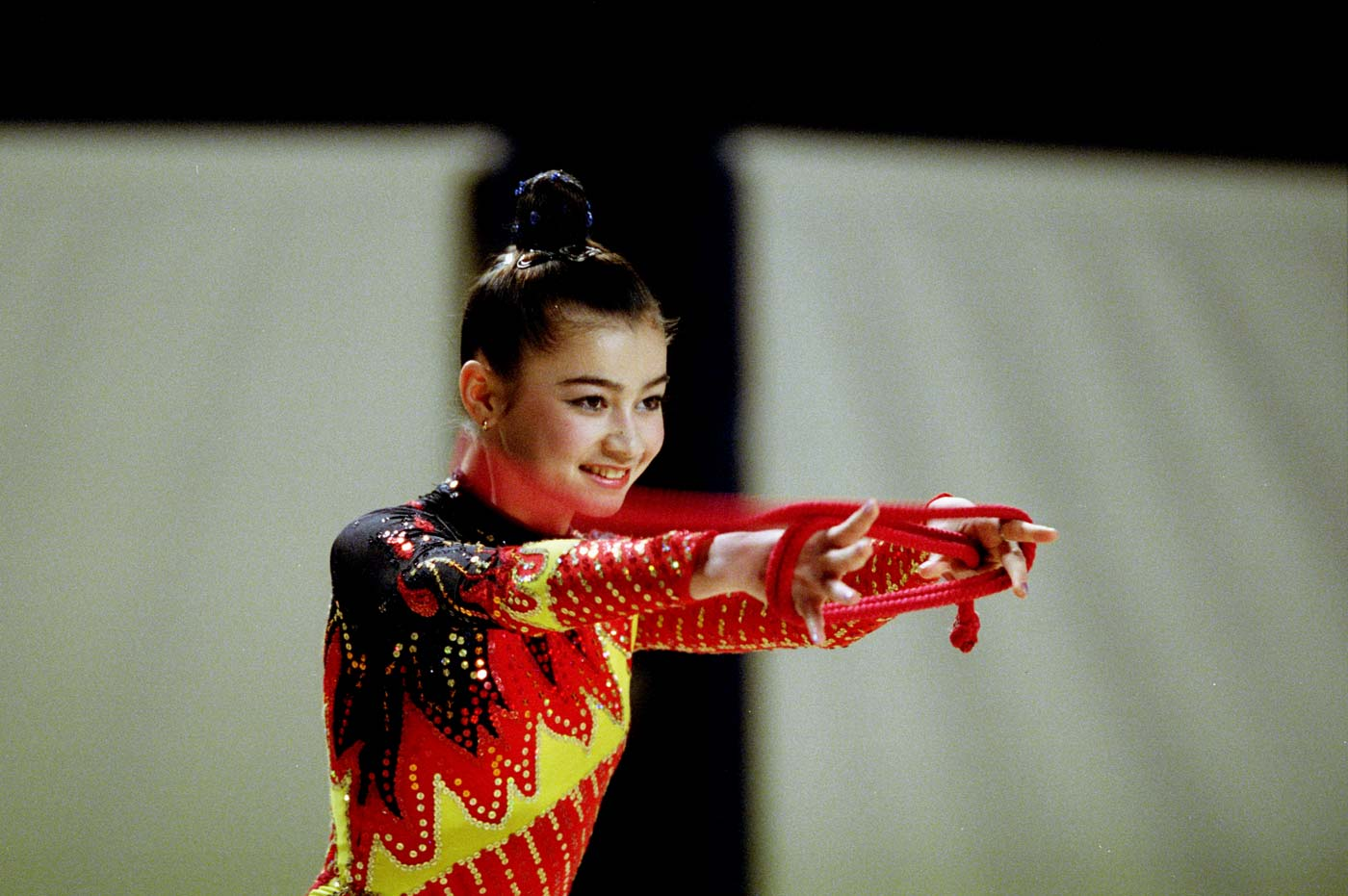
Wrapping the rope around both hands (Zarina Gizikova)
