= Ball (rhythmic gymnastics) =

Performing apparatus

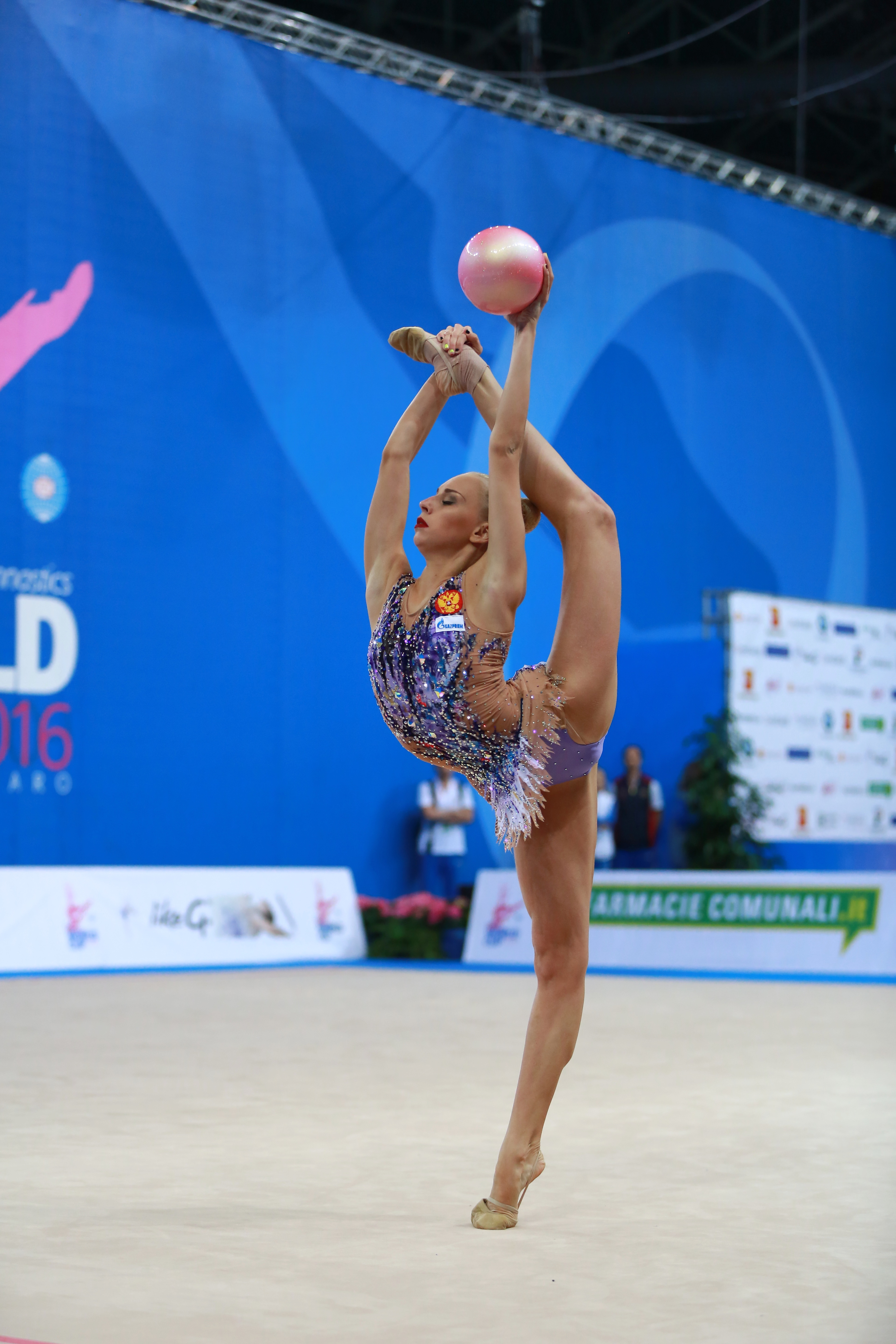
Yana Kudryavtseva with ball

The ball is an apparatus used in the sport of rhythmic gymnastics. It is one of the five apparatuses utilized in this discipline, alongside the clubs, hoop, ribbon, and rope.

== History ==
The rhythmic ball has evolved significantly since the inception of rhythmic gymnastics. The early forms of the sport, known as "group gymnastics" or "modern gymnastics," incorporated apparatus like balls, hoops, and ropes, which were used more for their utility in exercises rather than for performance artistry. For gymnastics, the ball originally began as a small ball around the size of a tennis ball and grew in size to make it easier for the audience to see and for the gymnast to roll along the body.

- Early 1920s: The use of balls in various gymnastics schools in Europe emerged, focusing on simple throws and catches to enhance physical fitness and develop movement.
- 1950s: Rhythmic gymnastics began to formalize as a distinct sport. Balls became more prominent, and their use evolved to include more complex manipulations and artistic elements. It was used in the team portable apparatus competitions for women at both the 1952 and 1956 Olympics before the event was discontinued.
- 1960s and 1970s: The FIG established official rules and competitions for rhythmic gymnastics. The ball was recognised as an official apparatus from the beginning, along with the hoop and rope, and routines began to incorporate more sophisticated techniques and artistic choreography.

The evolution of the rhythmic ball reflects the broader development of rhythmic gymnastics, emphasizing a blend of athleticism, artistry, and innovation. From 2001-2012, each apparatus had a compulsory body group of movements that had to predominate in the exercise; for ball, this was flexibility and waves (a continuous movement through the whole body).

== Specifications and technique ==
The rhythmic ball is made from rubber or a synthetic material with similar properties. According to the Fédération Internationale de Gymnastique (FIG), the official specifications for the ball are as follows:

- Diameter: 18 to 20 cm
- Weight: Minimum of 400 grams
- Color: Can vary, often brightly colored or decorated

The ball should not be grasped or held against the wrist during the routine. One of the difficulties of working with the ball is keeping it balanced in the hand without gripping it.

== Elements ==
Gymnasts perform a variety of elements with the ball, including high or low throws, balancing the ball on a small area of the body, moving or catching it with a part of the body other than the hands, or holding it with a part of the body other than the hands during a body element. During the exercise, the gymnast should spend most of the time handling the ball with one hand. The elements that are considered to be particular to the ball are:

- Large roll: Rolling the ball over at least two segments of the body (e.g. the torso and legs or torso and arms)
- Other rolls:
  - Rolling the ball on the floor
  - A combination of several small rolls along the body
- Figure Eight: Moving the ball in consecutive circular motions
- Rotating the ball:
  - Rotating the ball around one hand or the hand around the ball
  - Rotating the hands around the ball
  - Rotating the ball freely on a part of the body, such as on top of the finger
- Catching the ball with one hand
- Letting the ball rebound after a high throw and catching with a part of the body other than the hands
- Bouncing:
  - A series of small bounces off the floor
  - An active, high bounce off the floor

== Photo gallery ==
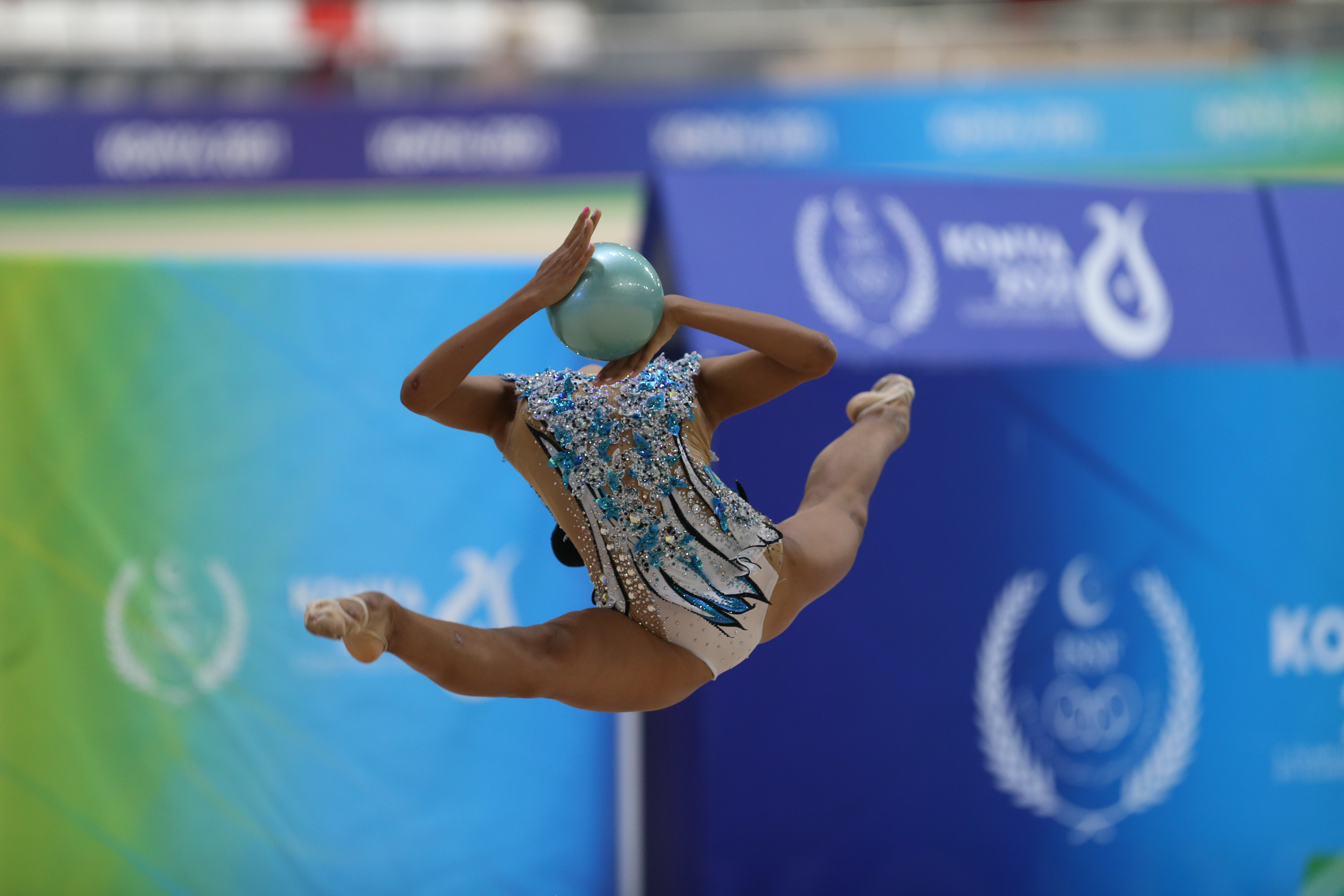
Rolling the ball between the hands during a split leap (Aibota Yertaikyzy)

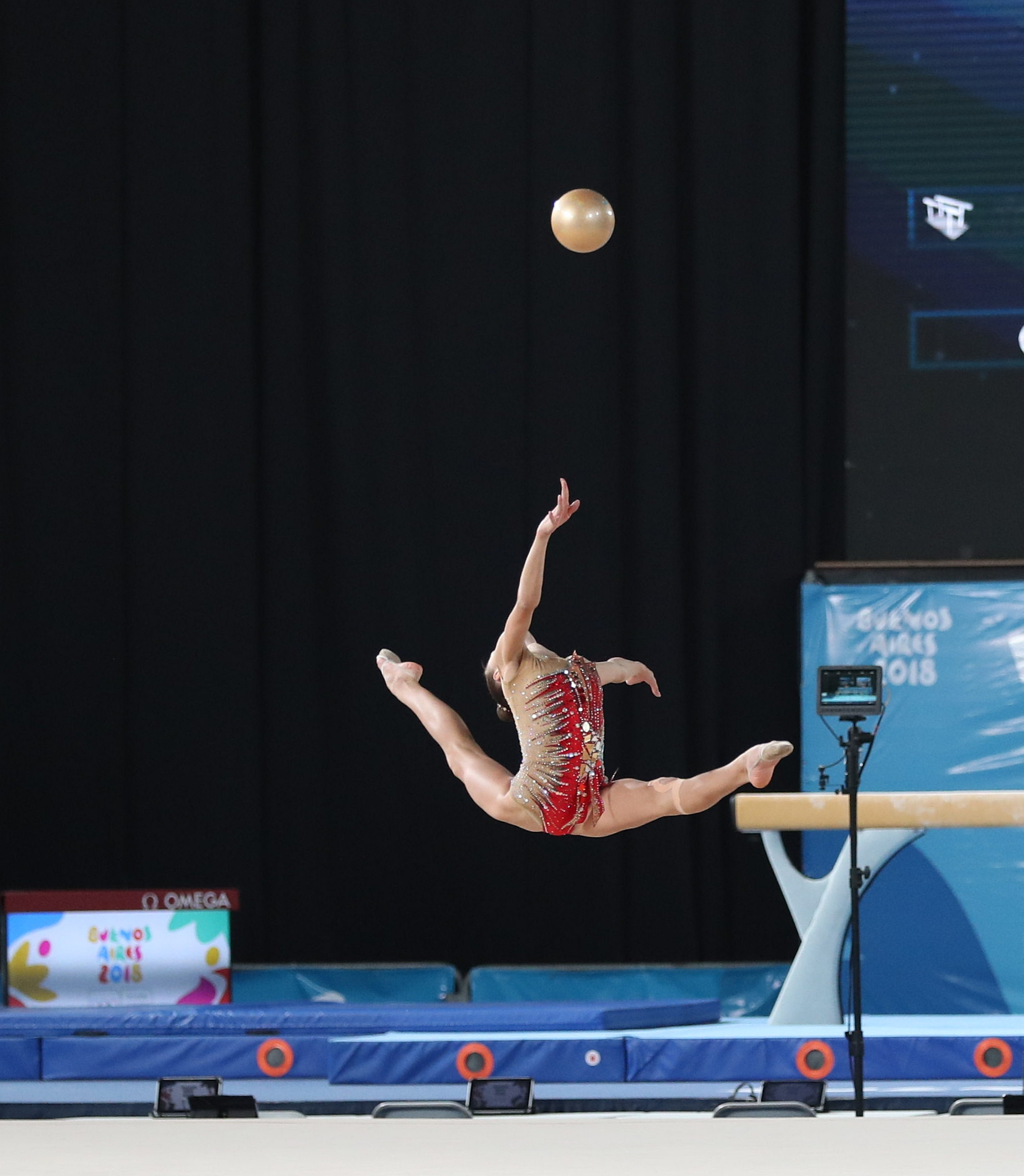
Performing a split leap under a thrown ball (Ekaterina Fetisova)

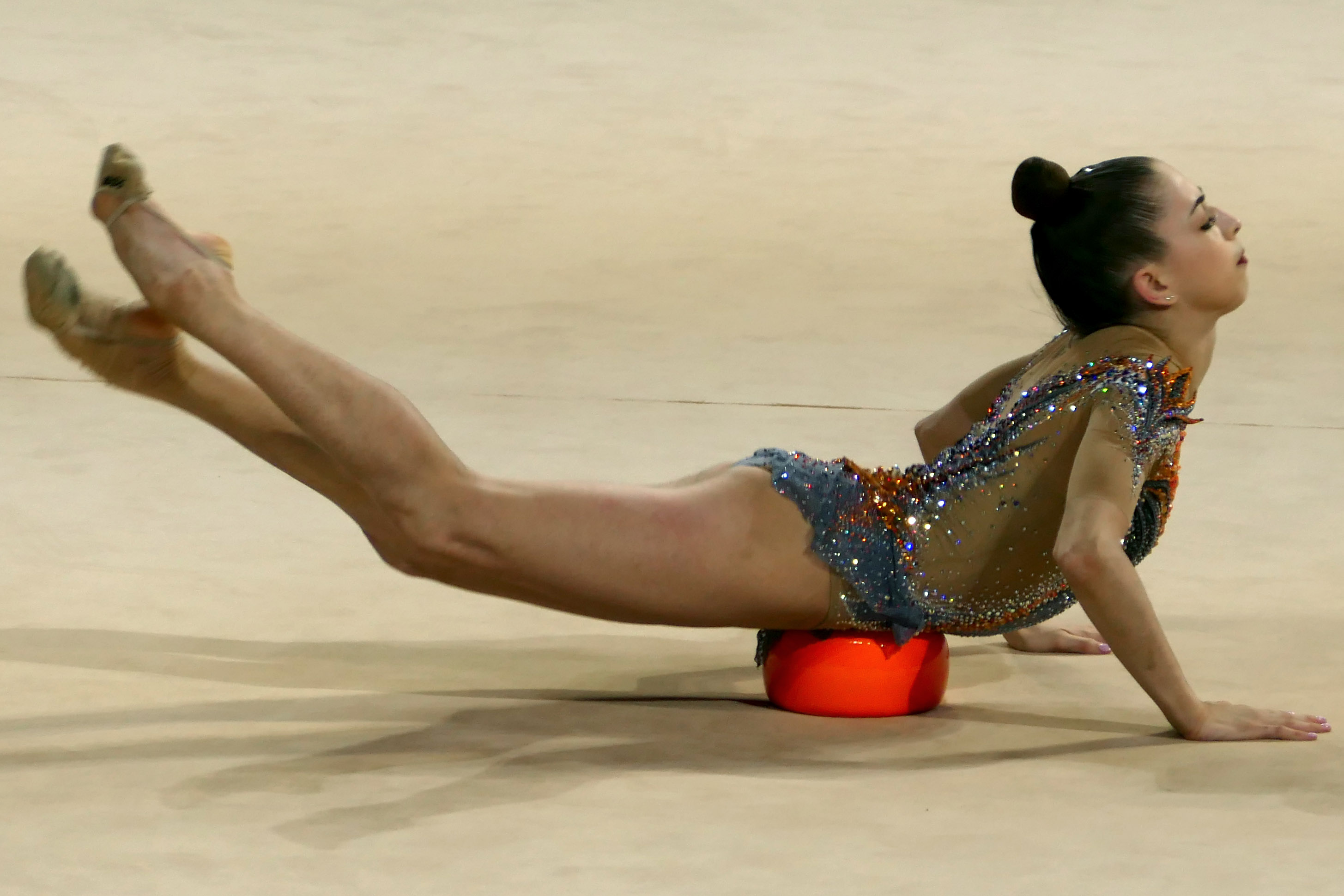
Rolling on top of the ball (Daria Atamanov)

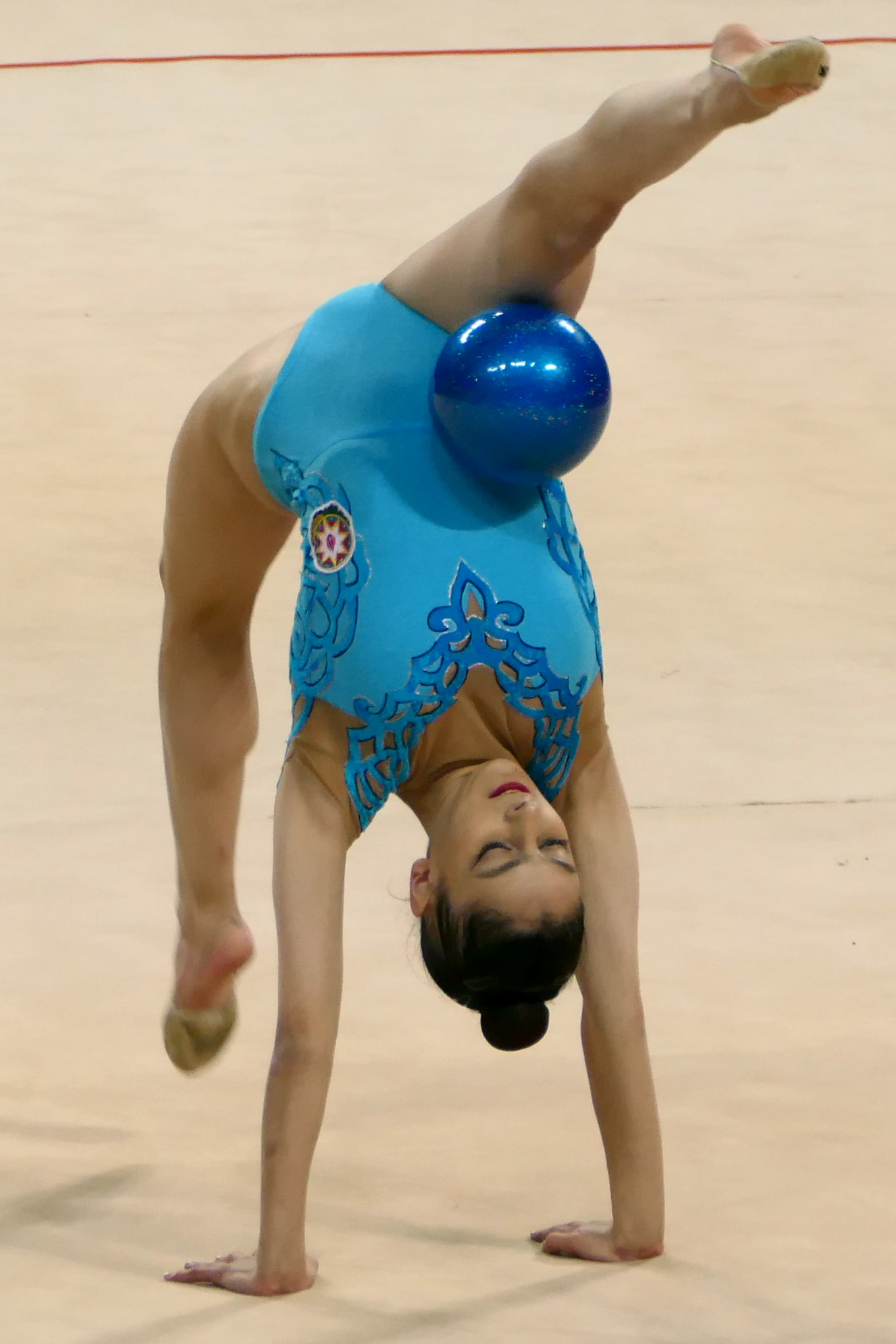
Holding the ball between leg and torso during a walkover (Ilona Zeynalova)

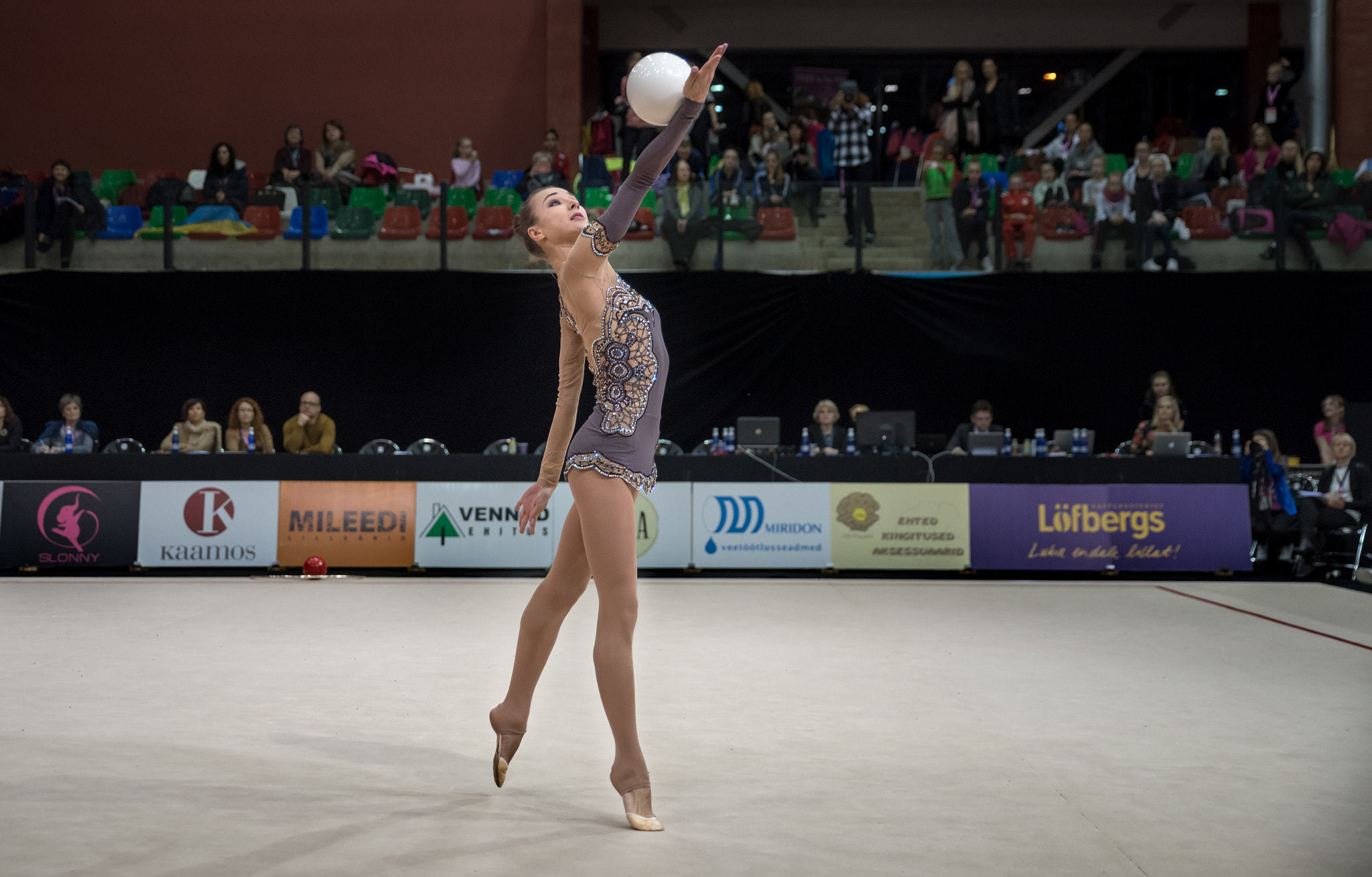
Rolling the ball along the arm (Viktoria Mazur)

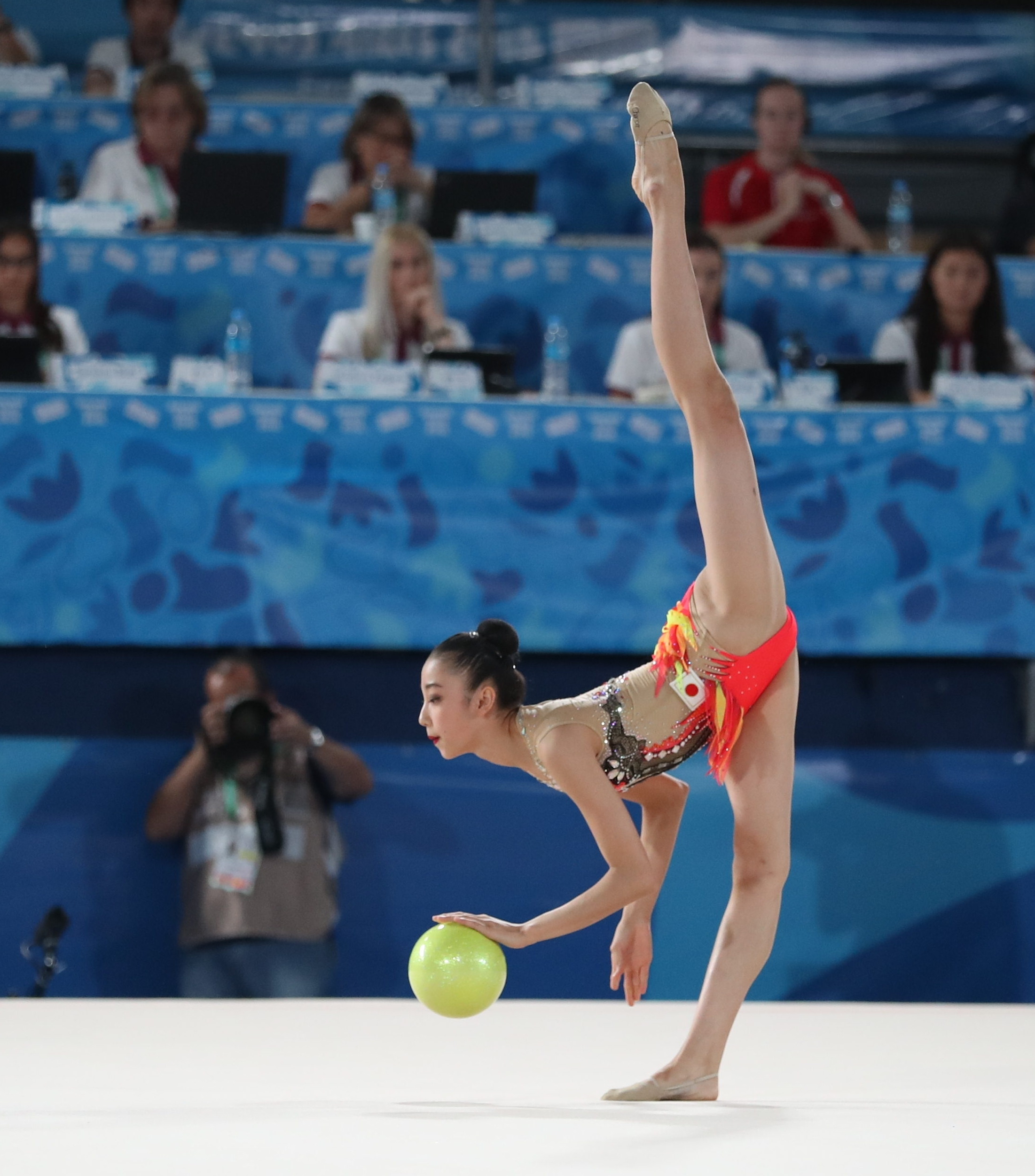
Bouncing the ball while balancing (Aino Yamada)

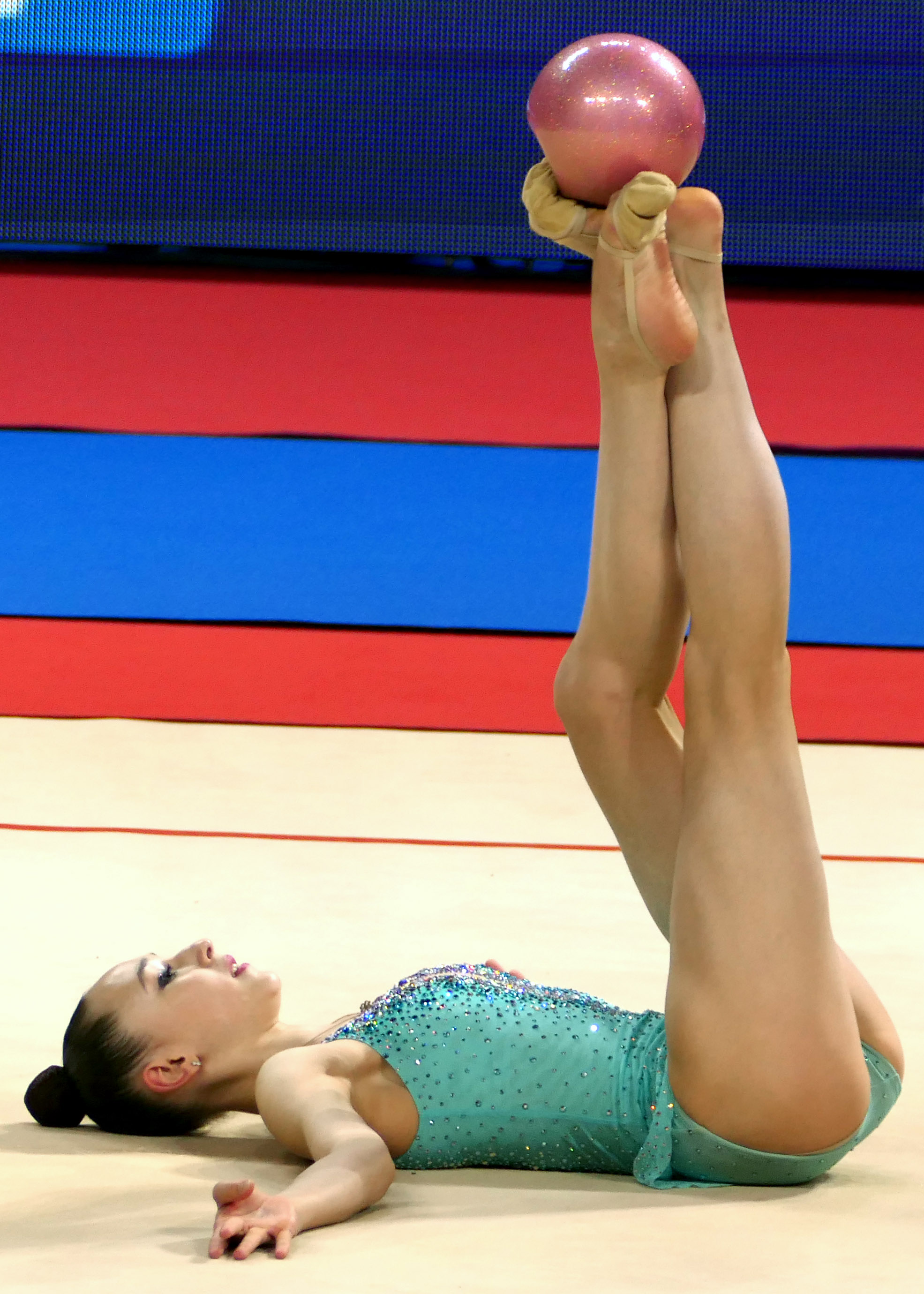
Balancing the ball on the foot (Anastasiya Sarantseva)

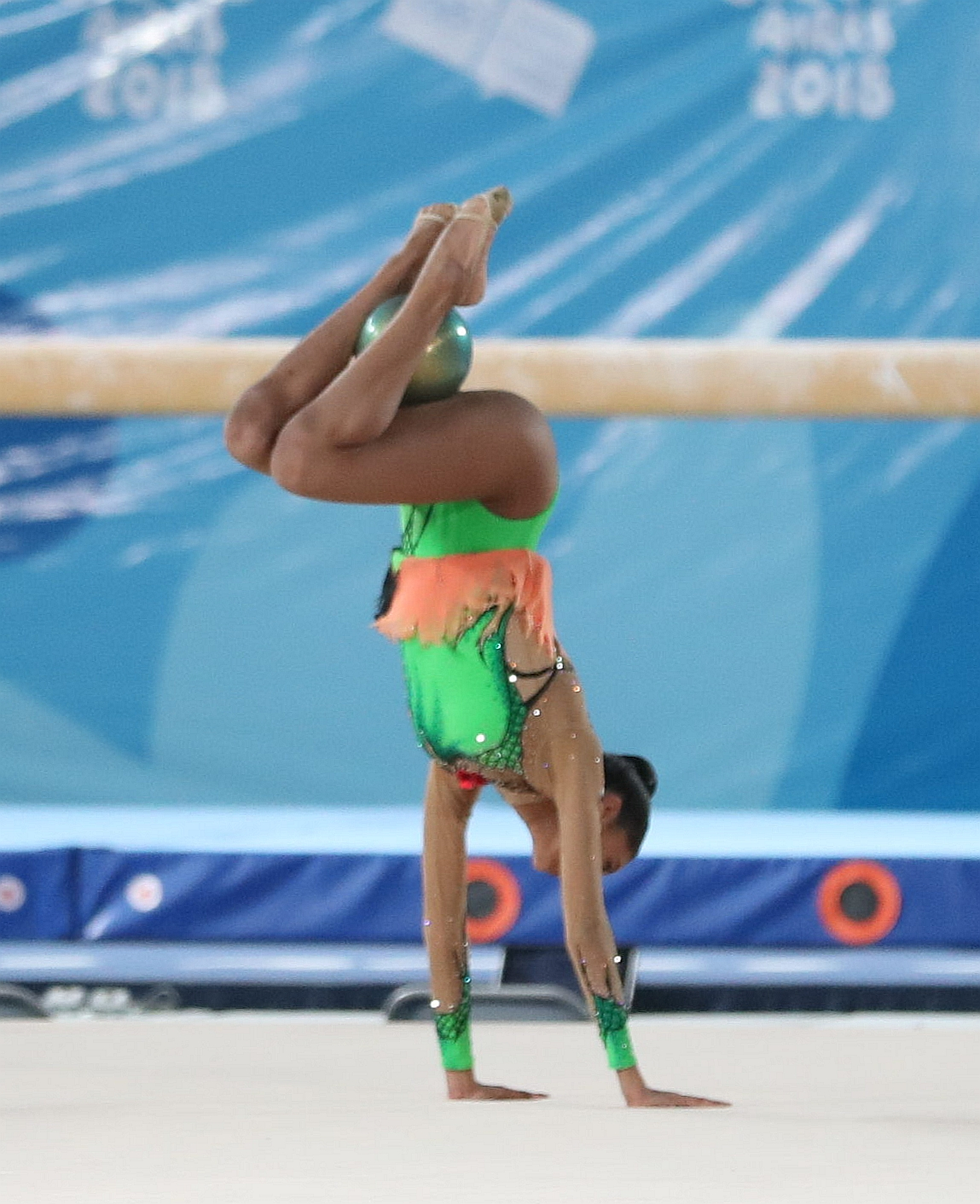
Catching the ball with the legs (Tia Sobhy)
