= Elizaveta =

Elizaveta (Russian: Елизавета) is a feminine Russian given name, a variant of Elizabeth. Notable people with the name include:

- Elizaveta Akhmatova (1820–1904), known by the pen name Leila, Russian writer, publisher and translator
- Elizaveta Aleksandrova (born 1994), Russian rhythmic gymnast
- Elizaveta Alexandrova-Zorina, (born 1984), Russian author and columnist
- Elizaveta Arzamasova (born 1995), Russian actress
- Elizaveta Axenova (born 1995), Russian-Kazakhstani luger
- Elizaveta Bagriana (1893–1991) also transliterated Elisaveta Bagryana, Bulgarian poet
- Elizaveta Bagryantseva (1929–1996), also transliterated Yelizaveta, Russian discus thrower
- Elizaveta Bem (1843–1914), sometimes anglicized Elisabeth Boehm, Russian painter
- Elizaveta Bochkaryova, (born 1978), also transliterated Yelyzaveta, Ukrainian track cyclist
- Elizaveta Boyarskaya (born 1985), Russian theater and film actress
- Elizaveta Bryzhina (born 1989), also transliterated Yelyzaveta Bryzghina, Ukrainian sprinter
- Elizaveta Busch (1886–1960), Russian/Soviet botanist
- Elizaveta Bykova (1913–1989), also transliterated Elisaveta, Soviet chess player
- Elizaveta Chesnokova (born 1996) also transliterated Yelizaveta, Russian freestyle skier
- Elizaveta Dementyeva (1928–2022), Soviet sprint canoeist
- Elizaveta Demirova (born 1987), also transliterated Yelizaveta, Russian track and field sprinter
- Elizaveta Ivanovna Dmitrieva (1887–1928), also transliterated Elisaveta, known by the pen name Cherubina de Gabriak, Russian poet
- Elizaveta Dobrieva (born 1942), Russian researcher and teacher
- Elizaveta Dorfman (c. 1899–c. 1942), or Gerševna, Jewish Russian artist
- Elizaveta Dubrovina (born 1993), Russian acrobatic gymnast
- Elizaveta Ermolaeva (born 1930) also transliterated Yelizavet, Soviet middle-distance runner
- Elizaveta Ersberg (1882-1942), Russian parlormaid to the Imperial family
- Elizaveta Feodorovna (1864–1918), sometimes anglicized Elizabeth or Elisabeth, Grand Duchess of Russia
- Elizaveta Gerdt (1891–1975), Russian ballerina
- Elizaveta Glinka (1962–2016), Russian humanitarian
- Elizaveta Gnevusheva (1916–1994), Soviet historian, orientalist, university lecturer, and publicist
- Elizaveta Golovanova (born 1993), Russian model and beauty pageant titleholder
- Elizaveta Golubeva (born 1996), Russian speed skater
- Elizaveta Goreva (1859–1917), Russian theatre actress and entrepreneur
- Elizaveta Grechishnikova (born 1983) also transliterated Yelizaveta, Russian long-distance runner
- Elizaveta Ianchuk (born 1993), Ukrainian tennis player
- Elizaveta Karamihailova (1897–1968), Bulgarian physicist
- Elizaveta Khripounova (fl. from 2002), Russian-American pianist, singer/songwriter and opera singer
- Elizaveta Khudaiberdieva (born 2002), Russian ice dancer
- Elizaveta Klevanovich (born 2001), Russian swimmer
- Elizaveta Klyuchereva (born 1999), Russian pianist
- Elizaveta Kojevnikova (born 1973), also transliterated Yelizaveta Kozhevnikova, Russian freestyle skier
- Elizaveta Koteneva (born 2004), Russian group rhythmic gymnast
- Elizaveta Kovalskaya (1849/1851–1943), also transliterated Yelizaveta, Russian revolutionary, narodnik, and founding member of Black Repartition
- Elizaveta Kruglikova (1865–1941), Russian/Soviet painter, etcher, silhouettist, and monotypist
- Elizaveta Kulichkova (born 1996), Russian tennis player
- Elizaveta Kusheleva (1850–c. 1916/1918), birth name of Elisabeth Dmitrieff, Russian revolutionary, and feminist activist
- Elizaveta Lastochkina (1869–1967), Russian teacher of the deaf
- Elizaveta Lavrovskaya (1845–1919) also transliterated Yelizaveta, Russian mezzo-soprano
- Elizaveta Levina (fl. from 1994), also known as Liza, Russian-American mathematical statistician
- Elizaveta Litvinova (1845–c. 1919, Russian mathematician and pedagogue
- Elizaveta Lugovskikh (born 2000), Russian rhythmic gymnast
- Elizaveta Makarova (born 1994), Russian pair skater
- Elizaveta Malakhova (born 1993), Ukrainian chess player
- Elizaveta Malashenko (born 1996), Russian handballer
- Elizaveta Mavrikievna (1865–1927), sometimes anglicized Elizabeth or Elisabeth, Grand Duchess of Russia
- Elizaveta Maximová (born 1992), Czech actress
- Elizaveta Mikhailovna (1826–1845), sometimes anglicized Elizabeth, Grand Duchess of Russia
- Elizaveta Misnikova (born 2005), Belarusian singer
- Elizaveta Mukasei (1912–2009), Soviet spy
- Elizaveta Narishkina (1838–1928), sometimes anglicized Elizabeth, Russian noblewoman, court official, and memoirist
- Elizaveta Naydenova (1876–1951), Russian theatre and film actress
- Elizaveta Nazarenkova (born 1995), Russian rhythmic gymnast
- Elizaveta Nugumanova (born 2002), Russian figure skater
- Elizaveta Osetinskaya (born 1977), also transliterated Yelizaveta, Russian journalist and media manager
- Elizaveta Oshurkova (born 1991), Ukrainian-Russian racing cyclist
- Elizaveta Ostrogska (1539–1582), Ruthenian heiress
- Elizaveta Parnova (born 1994), known as Liz, Russian-Australian athlete
- Elizaveta Pecherskikh (born 2004), Kyrgyzstani swimmer
- Elizaveta Peskova (born 1998), known as Liza, Russian political assistant
- Elizaveta Petrovna (1709–1762), sometimes anglicized Elizabeth, Empress of Russia
- Elizaveta Yurievna Pilenko (1891–1945), birth name of Maria Skobtsova, Russian noblewoman, poet, nun, and member of the French Resistance
- Elizaveta Pletneva (born 2002), Russian-American group rhythmic gymnast
- Elizaveta Polonskaya (1890–1969), Russian poet, translator, and journalist
- Elizaveta Posadskikh (born 1994), Russian BMX freestyle cyclist
- Elizaveta Rodnova (born 1999), also transliterated Yelizaveta, Russian ice hockey player
- Elizaveta Rutkovskaja (born 1997), Estonian footballer
- Elizaveta Ryadninskaya (born 2001), Russian taekwondoist
- Elizaveta Ryzih (born 1988), known professionally as Lisa Ryzih, German pole vault athlete
- Elizaveta Salhias de Tournemire (1815–1892), known by the pen name Evgeniia Tur, Russian writer, children's writer, critic, editor, journalist, publisher, salon hostess, and translator
- Elizaveta Sandunova (1772/76–1826), sometimes anglicized Elizabeth, Russian stage actress, operatic mezzo-soprano, and the wife of Sila Sandunov
- Elizaveta Sergeychik (born 1997), Belarusian footballer
- Elizaveta Shabelskaya-Bork (1855–1917), Russian writer, actress, and entrepreneur
- Elizaveta Shahkhatuni (1911–2011), Soviet-Armenian aeronautical engineer and university teacher
- Elizaveta Shanaeva (born 2003), Russian ice dancer
- Elizaveta Sidorenko (born 2003), Russian Paralympic swimmer
- Elizaveta Solonchenko (born 1972), Russian politician
- Elizaveta Solozhenkina (born 2003), Russian chess grandmaster
- Elizaveta Mikhailovna Speranskaya (1799–1857), sometimes anglicized Elisabeth Speransky, Russian noblewoman and writer
- Elizaveta Stekolnikova (born 1974), Kazakhstani ice dancer
- Elizaveta Alexandrovna Stroganova (1779–1818), Russian aristocrat
- Elizaveta Svilova (1900–1975), also transliterated Yelizaveta, Russian filmmaker and film editor
- Elizaveta Tarakhovskaya (1891–1968), also transliterated Yelizaveta, Russian poet, playwright, translator, and author of children's books
- Elizaveta Tichtchenko (born 1975), also transliterated Yelizaveta, Russian volleyball player
- Elizaveta Tuktamysheva (born 1996), Russian figure skater
- Elizaveta Ukolova (born 1998), Czech figure skater
- Elizaveta Valdemarovna Ivantsiv (born 1982), known professionally as Yolka, Ukrainian singer and presenter
- Elizaveta Vodovozova (1844–1923), Russian children's writer, educational theorist, and memoirist
- Elizaveta Vorontsova (1739–1792), mistress of Emperor Peter III of Russia
- Elizaveta Voronyanskaya (died 1973), assistant of the Russian writer Aleksandr Solzhenitsyn
- Elizaveta Yankova (1768–1861), Russian writer
- Elizaveta Yulyevna Zarubina (1900–1987), sometimes anglicized Elizabeth, Soviet spy and podpolkovnik of the MGB
- Elizaveta Zarbatova (1926–2014), Russian singer, member of Buranovskiye Babushki
- Elizaveta Zhirkova (1888–1949), birth name of Elisheva Bikhovski, Russian and Israeli poet, writer, literary critic, and translator
- Elizaveta Zhuk (born 2003), sometimes Czechized as Jelizaveta Žuková, Russian-Czech pair skater
- Elizaveta Zvantseva (1864–1921), Russian painter and art instructor
- Inessa-Elizaveta Fiodorovna (1874–1920), French-Russian communist politician, Bolshevik, and feminist

== See also ==
- Elizabeth (given name)
- Elizabeth (disambiguation)
- Elisaveta (disambiguation)
- Jelisaveta (disambiguation)
