= Erman =

Erman may refer to:

== Given name ==
- Erman Bulucu (born 1989), Turkish footballer
- Erman Eltemur (born 1993), Turkish karateka
- Erman Güraçar (born 1974), Turkish footballer
- Erman Kılıç (born 1983), Turkish footballer
- Erman Kunter (born 1956), Turkish basketball player
- Erman Öncü (born 1976), Turkish professor
- Erman Özgür (born 1977), Turkish footballer

== Surname ==
- Adolf Erman (1854–1937), German Egyptologist
- Cem Erman (born Süleyman Faik Durgun in 1947–2011), Turkish film actor
- Darren Erman, American basketball coach
- Georg Adolf Erman (1806–1877), German physicist, father of Adolf
- John Erman (1935–2021), American TV and film director, actor, and producer
- Kristina Erman (born 1993), Slovenian footballer
- Paul Erman (1764–1851), German physicist, father of Georg
- Verda Erman (1944–2014), Turkish classical pianist

== Places ==
- Dallag Erman, a settlement in the Dzau district of South Ossetia

== See also ==
- Ehrmann
- Ehrman
- Ertman
