= Ertman =

Ertman is a surname. Notable people with the surname include:

- Jennifer Ertman (died 1993), American murder victim
- Martha Ertman (born c. 1964), American law professor

== See also ==
- Erman
