= Elisaveta =

Elisaveta (Bulgarian: Елисавета) is a name that may refer to:

- Elisaveta Bagriana (1893–1991), Bulgarian poet
- Elisaveta Belogradskaya, Russian Imperial Court opera singer and composer
- Elisaveta Bem (1843–1914), Russian painter
- Elisaveta Bykova (1913–1989), Soviet chess player
- Elisaveta Dmitrieva (1887–1928), Russian poet
- Elisaveta Konsulova-Vazova (1881–1965), Bulgarian artist and art instructor
- Elisaveta Petrovna (1709–1762), empress of Russia
- Elisaveta Ryzih (born 1988), German pole vaulter
- Elisaveta Stekolnikowa (born 1974), figure skater
- Elisaveta Svilova (1900–1975), Soviet Russian film director and film editor

== See also ==
- Elizabeth (given name)
- Elizabeth (disambiguation)
- Elizaveta (disambiguation)
- Jelisaveta (disambiguation)
