= Elizaveta Busch =

Russian-Soviet botanist (1886–1960)

Elizaveta Aleksandrovna Busch, née Endaurova (1886–1960) was a Russian / Soviet botanist known for studying the flora of the North Caucasus and Siberia. She married Nikolai Busch in 1908 and accompanied him in his expeditions. In the 1930s, they established a botanical station near Erman, South Ossetia, where she was buried. Not to be confused with Elizaveta Merkurievna Endaurova, her paternal aunt.

The standard author abbreviation E.A.Busch is used to indicate this person as the author when citing a botanical name.
