= Pseudocamelina =

Scientific classification
- Kingdom: Plantae
- Clade: Tracheophytes
- Clade: Angiosperms
- Clade: Eudicots
- Clade: Rosids
- Order: Brassicales
- Family: Brassicaceae
- Genus: Pseudocamelina (Boiss.) N.Busch

Genus of plants

Pseudocamelina is a genus of flowering plants belonging to the family Brassicaceae.

Its native range is Iraq to Iran, Western Himalaya.

Species:

- Pseudocamelina aphragmodes (Boiss.) N.Busch
- Pseudocamelina bakhtiarica Esmailbegi, Mirtadz. & Al-Shehbaz
- Pseudocamelina campylocarpa (Boiss.) N.Busch
- Pseudocamelina campylopoda (Bornm. & Gauba) Hadac & Chrtek
- Pseudocamelina conwayi (Hemsl.) Al-Shehbaz
- Pseudocamelina glaucophylla (DC.) N.Busch
- Pseudocamelina kermanica Esmailbegi, Mirtadz. & Al-Shehbaz
- Pseudocamelina kleinii Rech.f.
- Pseudocamelina kurdica (A.G.Mill.) Esmailbegi & Al-Shehbaz
