= Mark Tochilkin =

Ukrainian painter and sculptor

Mark Tochilkin (Russe : Марк Михалович Точилкин), was born in 1958 in Dniepropetrovsk in Ukraine, he is a painter and sculptor. Figurative artist, he is best known for his portraits, landscapes and his musicians. The work of Tochilkin is characterized by his technique and the pictorial mastery of his compositions.

== Biography ==
=== Early life and family ===
Tochilkin's father was an engineer and his mother an economist. He has discovered very early a vocation for painting.

In 1977 he graduated from the Dniepropetrovsk Institute of the Arts, and in 1983 from the Leningrad Academy of Arts, where he obtained his doctorate in Art history. During his studies, in the years 1977–83, Tochilkin had six hours of painting study each day, from eight o'clock in the morning until two in the afternoon, plus additional lessons on theories and art history. Studies at the academy were strongly oriented towards a classical academic realistic approach. Upon graduation, he was accepted as a member of the Artists' Union of the USSR. He then participated in a large number of individual and group exhibitions.

Tochilkin's style took a new turn after he finished his academic studies. The academic classical style no longer satisfied him. In addition to influences by Italian academic painting and Spanish painting, Tochilkin's paintings started to include expressive elements such as bold brush strokes and big patched of color. Surrounded by the stylistic variety of contemporary art, Tochilkin adopted a unique mode of expression which plurastically combines several styles. He insists, however, in his paintings on complete harmony and well- balanced composition.

=== Personal life ===
In 1984 he married the Ukrainian artist Ina Belous, with whom he collaborated to give a series of collaborative artworks, which mix Belous' specific technique with Tochilkin's composition.

== Career ==
In the early 1990s, his work was exhibited at the Detroit Museum of Art as well as at C.W. Post University, Long Island, in the United States; at the University of Camerino's museum, Italy; at the Heidelberg University's museum, Germany; at the Uzhhorod museum in Ukraine; and at international contemporary art fairs such as Art Miami or Art New York, as well as in a lot of art galleries in Europe and the United States. His work was exhibited in different solo exhibitions in Ukraine, Russia, Poland, Belgium, the United States, Germany, and Israel.

In 1994, Mark Tochilkin was the subject of an article by Joseph A. Melamed, which recalls that the artist's artworks were acquired in various museums in Eastern Europe, such as the National Museum in Warsaw, and four Ukrainian museums from the time of the former USSR.

Tochilkin achieved some success, and his works sold in major Auctions (Christie's in London) from the mid-1990s. An international rating was established, and it was found in official catalogs such as Artprice, Artnet.

In 1995, he participated in a charity sale for the benefit of the AKIM association at Sotheby's with other personalities, including Robert De Niro, Whoopie Goldberg, Yitzhak Rabin, Oliver Stone, Diego Maradonna... The following year, he participated in a new charity sale in New York, for the benefit of the AKIM USA association with other personalities such as James Brown, Patrick Bruel, Phil Collins, or even Benjamin Netanyahu.

In 1998, he had a solo exhibition at the Caesare Gallery, in Florida.

In 1999, he participated in the exhibition "Judaicart", alongside other artists from the School of Paris.

In 2002, he begins making sculpture. He then invents a special process to color his bronze sculptures.

In 2015, he begins a new collaboration with the artist Arman Darian, an Armenian ceramicist. Their bronze sculptures are exhibited on Mamilla Avenue in Jerusalem for three years in a row.

== Art: specifics of the work ==
Art critic Grigori Ostrovski, Professor at the University of Jerusalem, specialized in the influence of Russian avant-garde movements in the world during the 19th and 20th centuries, describes Mark Tochilkin as a figurative painter working in an expressionist style. "One of the defining characteristics of Tochilkin's work is the outstanding technique and solid professionalism found in his painting, plastic art, drawing and composition". He divides Tochilkin's work into different series: lovers, animals, nostalgia, or music. He notes that Tochilkin's work is also characterized by a constant return to these same themes after intervals of several years. The same subject always comes up with a different approach, the artist varying the compositions. According to Ostrovski, music and musicians occupy a special place in a Tochilkin series called "music". The artist's characters include famous musicians such as Niccolo Paganini, Arthur Rubinstein, Leonard Bernstein and David Oistrakh among others. For Ostrovski, "the representation of music in painting is most difficult, if not impossible. Tochilkin has nevertheless achieved a tour de force: his canvas lets us see the music”. The reviewer recalls that this series portrays a symbiosis of colors, compositions, lines and tones that echo the sound of music. The artist captures the orchestra at its peak, the height of creative intensity. Another innovative technique developed by Mark Tochilkin is his introduction of frames, painted within the structure of the picture itself. These frames are gilded and abound in ornate baroque scrolls. The critic compares this deliberate splendor to a sly parody of "philistine love and ostentatious luxury". According to Ostrovski, this technique seems to be more effective: the double frame (one real, the other an illusion) appears to extend the painting's limits, thus creating a fascinating interaction between image and the viewer himself.

For the Professor Amnon Rubinstein, Tochilkin "combines the excellent academic training he received in the Soviet Union with the new experience and the new reality of Israel." He recognizes that the artist's works are characterized by humor and compassion, and that Tochilkin approaches his subjects with love and irony. He also believes that Tochilkin's art reflects his character and nature, "which are themselves kindness and sophistication mixed equally".

Orit Lotringer recalls that Mark Tochilkin is known for adopting a unique mode of expression which pluralistically combines several styles. He insists on harmony and always well-balanced compositions. His technique requires 3 or 4 months for each layer to dry before keeping up on the painting, which means that the artist is constantly working on different works. Unlike artists who "wait for their muse", he is in a demanding and constant work routine. Each painting evokes in the spectator a nostalgic experience and the memory of its own past, whatever its origin.

== Main exhibitions ==
- 1987: Republic Exhibition, Kiev Museum of Art, Kiev, Ukraine,
- 1992: Personal Exhibition, Beit Emmanuel Museum, Ramat Gan, Israel,
- 1993: National Gallery, Ottawa, Canada
- 1993: Albert White Gallery, Toronto, Canada
- 1996: "Nudes", Personal Exhibition, Shulamit Gallery, Tel Aviv, Israel
- 1998: Personal Exhibition, Caesare Gallery, Boca Raton, Florida, US
- 1995: "Masks", Exhibition and Auction, Sotheby's, Tel Aviv, Israel
- 1996: "Masks", Exhibition and Auction, Sotheby's, New York City
- 2002: Art Museum of Memphis, USA
- 2002: Exhibition "Salon d'Automne", Paris, France
- 2003: Exhibition "Art New York", New York City
- 2003: Exhibition "Art Miami", Miami, USA
- 2007, 2009, 2015, 2017: Exhibition "Weekend des Arts", Vannes, France
- 2002–2014: Exhibition "Art en capital", Grand Palais, Paris, France
- 2002, 2004–2013: Exhibition "Salon de la Société Nationale des Beaux Arts", Carrousel du Louvre, Paris, France
- 2013: Exhibition "Art Hamptons", New York City
- 2015: Exhibition "Drawings", Galerie Dina Sabourin, Paris, France
- 2016: Ein Hod Gallery, Ein Hod, Israel
- 2015–2017: Exhibition "Mamilla Avenue", Jerusalem, Israel,
- 2019: Exhibition "Contemporary Art Fair", Paris, France

== Awards ==
- 1990: Winner of the Painting Competition, Society of Ukrainian Artists, Kiev, Ukraine
- 2003: Bronze Medal, Salon 2003, Society of French Artists, Paris, France
- 2003: Consecration Prize, International Competition 2003, Puget-sur-Argens, France
- 2005: Bronze Medal, Salon National des Beaux Arts, Carrousel du Louvre, Paris, France
- 2008: Silver Medal, Salon 2008 of the Society of French Artists, Grand Palais, Paris, France

== Publications ==
- " Mark Tochilkin ", 1997, English, 15 pages
- " Mark Tochilkin ", Fine Art Galleries Eilat Editions, 1998, French-English-Russian, 135 pages
- " Mark Tochilkin ", Fine Art Galleries Eilat Editions, 1999, French-English-Russian, 135 pages
- " Mark Tochilkin ", Ti-Co Company, Tel Aviv Paris Moscow, 2013, French-English-Russian, 142 pages
