= Vakfıkebir bread =

Turkish bread

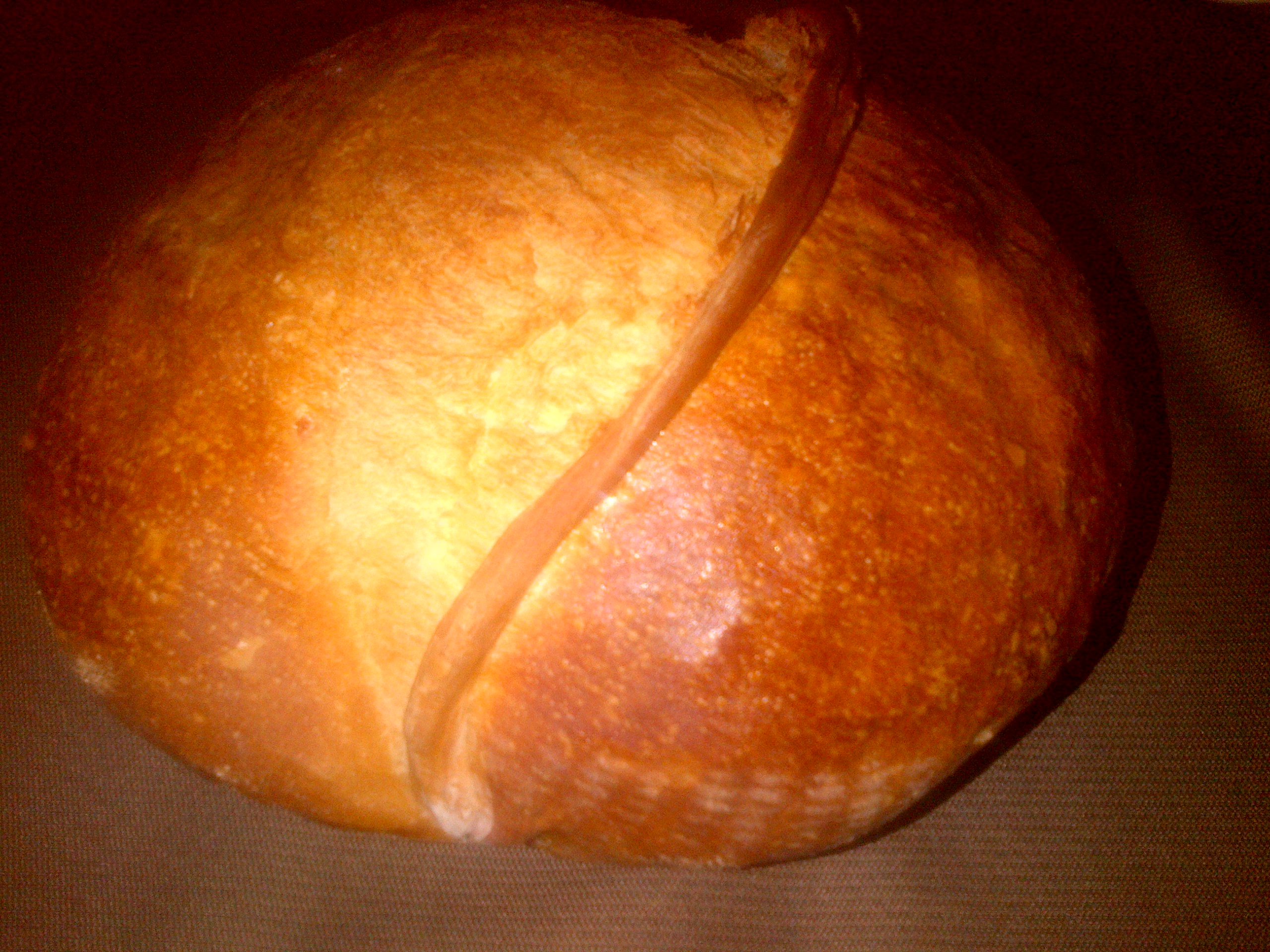
- Type: Bread
- Place of origin: Turkey
- Region or state: Trabzon
- Main ingredients: Durum flour

Vakfıkebir bread, produced in Vakfıkebir, as well as in Maçka – Hamsiköy, ranges from 0.45 to 7.5 kilograms in weight. It is known nearly everywhere in Turkey as "Vakfıkebir" or "Trabzon" bread. In addition to Trabzon, it is especially produced in small towns along major highways. It is baked in a wood-fired stone oven, and is leavened with natural sourdough. Vakfıkebir bread is flavorful, has a long shelf life, and does not mold easily. When it goes stale it is still good. During recent years, companies producing Vakfıkebir bread have opened in large cities such as Istanbul and Ankara. As it is cooked in stone ovens, it is also known as "Stone oven" (Taşfırın) bread. In some areas it is mistakenly called "wood bread" (odun ekmeği); what is meant is that the oven is wood-fired. A "Vakfıkebir Bread Festival" is held each year for the purpose of promoting this bread domestically and abroad.
