= Abode of Chaos =

Museum in Saint-Romain-au-Mont-d'Or, France, created by Thierry Ehrmann

Coordinates: 45°50′15.5″N 4°49′34″E

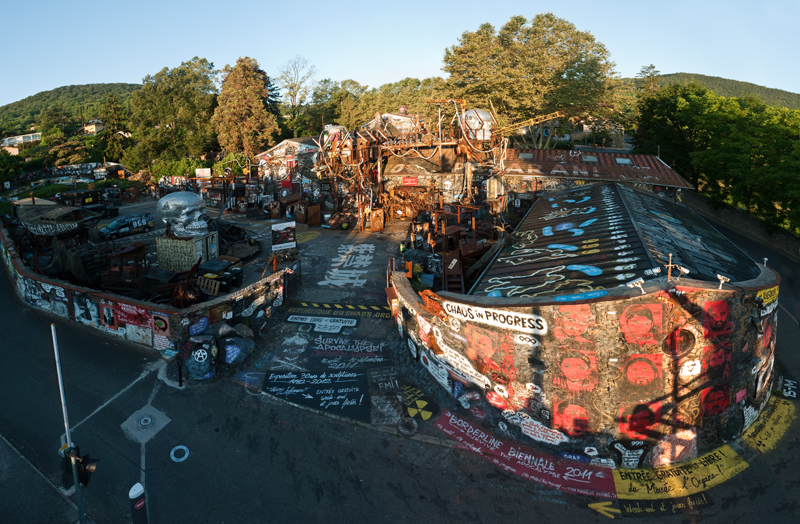
Abode of Chaos (2012)

The Abode of Chaos (French: Demeure du Chaos) is a contemporary art museum located in Saint-Romain-au-Mont-d'Or, a small town in the vicinity of Lyon, France, with over 2,500 works from many different artists, including the owner Thierry Ehrmann. Ehrmann is the founder and CEO of Groupe Serveur and Artprice.com, both of which are headquartered at the Abode.

The artwork is based around the transformation of the 17th century post house into a replica (post-)war zone, which contrasts with the peaceful village a few kilometers up the Saône river from Lyon. The mayor of the town said of the house: "It's humanly intolerable, ugly, dramatic, with its images of destruction. Whatever you think, for me it's not art, it's a provocation."

The Abode of Chaos has been the subject of several lawsuits, and – in 2009 – France's highest court, the Court of Cassation, ruled that Ehrmann would have to revert his home to its pre-Abode of Chaos state. In 2013, the Grenoble Court of Appeals imposed a fine for continued non-compliance of €750 per day. The Court of Cassation intervened in the case again in 2014 by reversing the lower court's decision, ruling that Ehrmann should have been assisted by counsel or his wife at the 2013 hearing because of his manic-depressive condition. In 2016, Ehrmann claimed "absolute victory" on his blog because of the passage of the law on freedom of creation, architecture and patrimony.
