= Nikolai Busch =

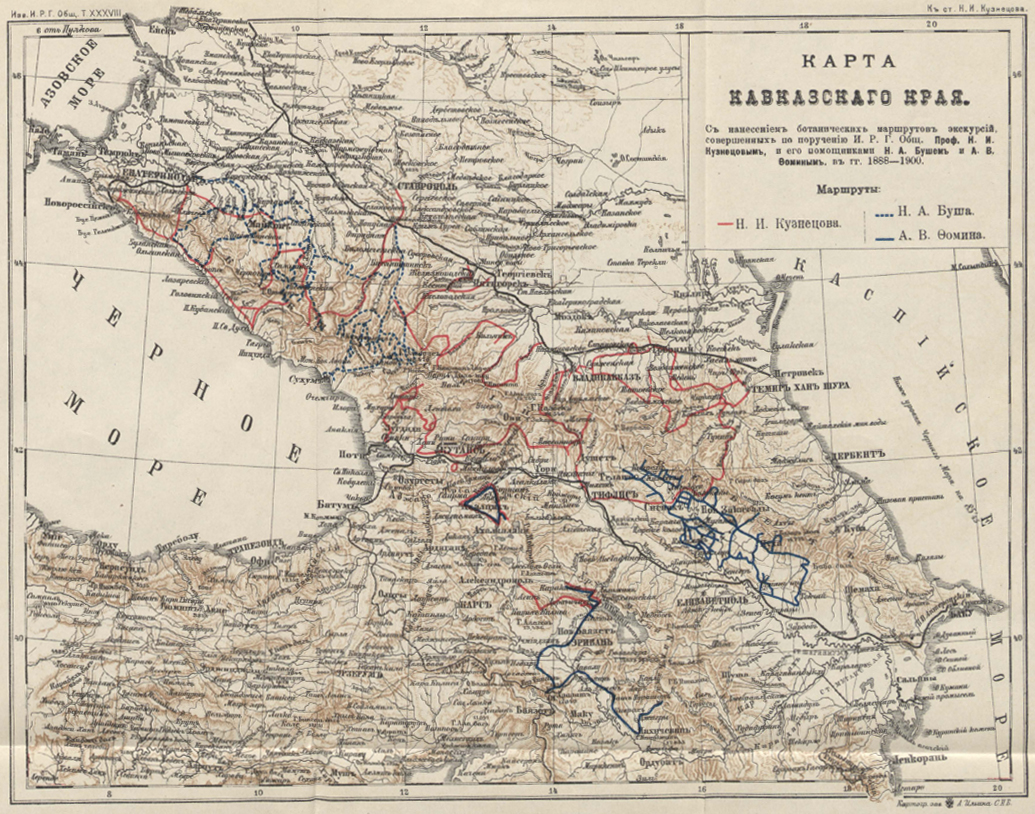
The routes of Busch's expeditions of 1888, 1889 and 1890 are shown in blue dotted lines

Nikolai Adolfovich Busch (Николай Адольфович Буш; 1869 – 1941) was a Russian / Soviet botanist. He was a leading expert on the flora of the Caucasus and read lectures at the Leningrad State University.

Busch was born in Slobodskoy, where his father worked as a forester. He graduated from Kazan University in 1891 and later pursued further studies at the Forestry Institute in St. Petersburg. Between 1888 and 1890, he travelled in the Caucasus as an assistant of N. I. Kuznetsov, collecting an extensive herbarium. Between 1894 and 1911, he conducted eleven expeditions to the Caucasus, along with a trip across Crimea. During one of such expeditions he met Elizaveta Endaurova (a niece of Elisabeth Boehm) who became his companion and then wife. Together with Vasilij Vasilievich Marcowicz and Georg (=Jurij) Nikolaewitch Woronow he issued the exsiccata Flora Caucasica exsiccata (1905 – 1911).

From 1911, Busch held a professorship at the St. Petersburg Higher Women's Courses and served as head of the botany department at the Psychoneurological Institute (1910–1917). His extensive fieldwork earned him the prestigious Przhevalsky Medal from the Russian Geographical Society. He described numerous new plant species from the Caucasus and produced detailed botanical-geographical maps of regions such as Ossetia and Digoria. A street in Tskhinvali is named after Nikolai and Elizaveta Busch.

The standard author abbreviation N.Busch is used to indicate this person as the author when citing a botanical name.
