= Noga Block =

Israeli rhythmic gymnast (born 2004)

- נוגה בלוק
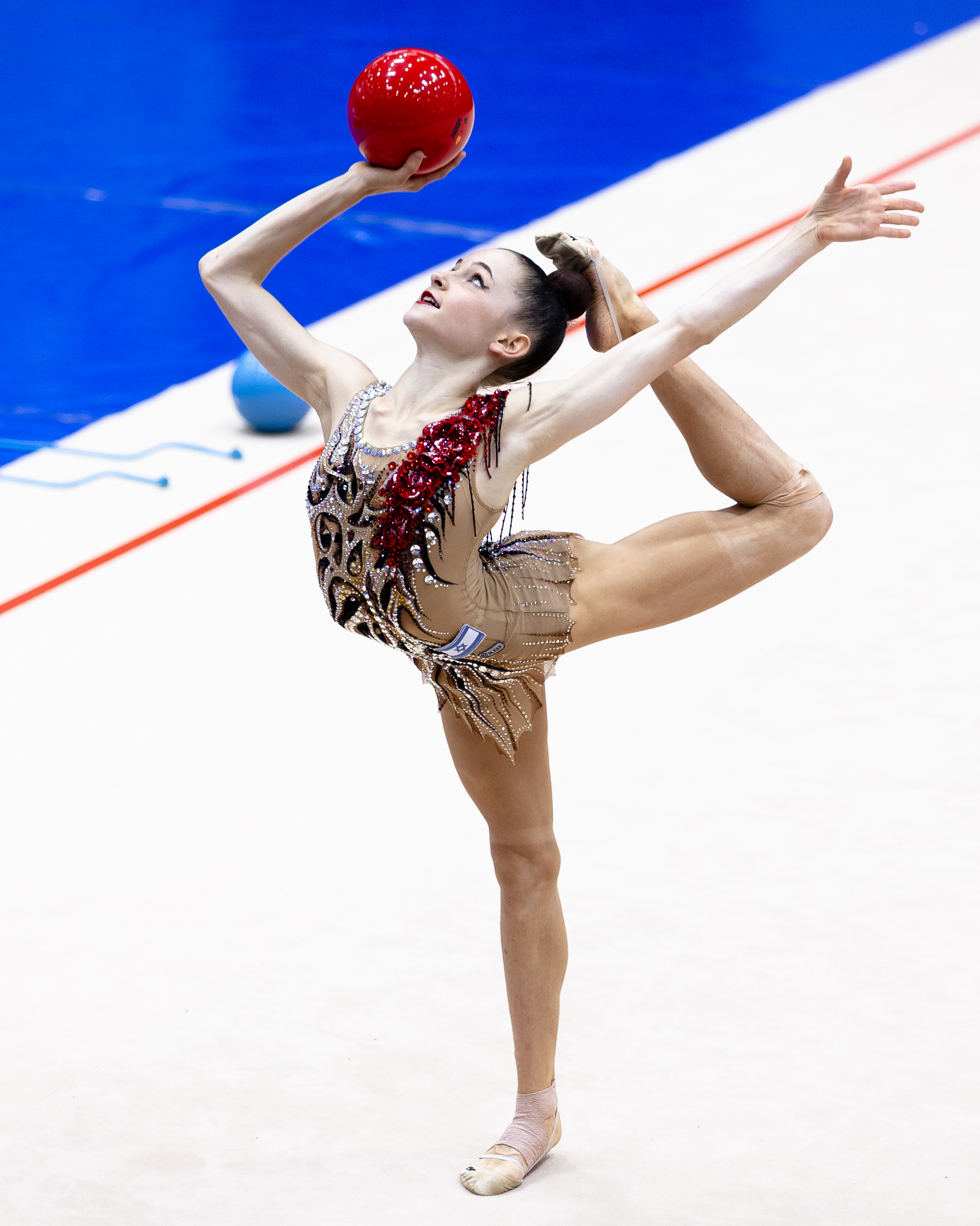

Personal information
- Born: 2004 (age 21–22)

Gymnastics career
- Discipline: Rhythmic gymnastics
- Country represented: Israel
- Club: Maccabi Atidim Hasharon
Medal record
Rhythmic Gymnastics
Representing Israel
Event	1st	2nd	3rd
FIG World Cup	0	0	1
Total	0	0	1
Junior World Championships
Bronze medal – third place	2019 Moscow	Ball
Bronze medal – third place	2019 Moscow	Team

Noga Block (Hebrew: נוגה בלוק; born 2004) is an Israeli retired rhythmic gymnast who competed at the 2019 Junior World Championships and won the bronze medal for the ball apparatus.
