= Volkan Bekçi =

Turkish footballer

Personal information
- Full name: Volkan Bekçi
- Date of birth: 15 February 1987 (age 39)
- Place of birth: Vakfıkebir, Turkey
- Height: 1.64 m (5 ft 4 1/2 in)
- Position: Midfielder

Team information
- Current team: Siirtspor
- Number: 61

Youth career
- 2001–2004: Galatasaray S.K. PAF

Senior career*
Years	Team	Apps	(Gls)
2004–2009	Galatasaray S.K.	0	(0)
2007	→ Gaziantepspor (loan)	17	(1)
2007–2008	→ Altay S.K. (loan)	9	(0)
2008–2009	→ Beylerbeyi S.K. (loan)	15	(2)
2009–	Siirtspor	0	(0)
- * Club domestic league appearances and goals as of 5 January 2009

Volkan Bekçi (born 15 February 1987) is a Turkish footballer who plays for Beylerbeyi S.K. on loan from Galatasaray S.K.

He is a midfielder and wears the 61 shirt which is the car number plate location code for Trabzon where his parents are from.
