= Osman Şirin =

8. First Vice-President of the Supreme Court (Criminal)
- In office 25 October 2004 – 5 November 2008
- Preceded by: Mater Kaban
- Succeeded by: İhsan Akçin

Personal details
- Born: November 5, 1943 (age 82) Vakfıkebir, Trabzon, Turkey

Osman Şirin (born November 5, 1943, in Vakfıkebir, Trabzon Province), is a high-ranked Turkish judge. He was a member of the Turkish Court of Cassation from 1991 to 2008, from 2004 as Deputy First President. On 5 November 2008, he retired from the Court.
