= Anna Batasova =

Russian rhythmic gymnast

- Born: October 26, 2004 (age 21) Moscow, Russia

Gymnastics career
- Discipline: Rhythmic gymnastics
- Country represented: Russia (2019–2024)
- Club: Dynamo Dmitrov
- Head coaches: Vera Milonova, Natalia Raskosova
Medal record
International gymnastics competitions
Event	1st	2nd	3rd
Junior World Championships	4	0	0
Junior European Championships	4	0	0
Total	8	0	0
Rhythmic Gymnastics
Representing Russia
Junior World Championships
Gold medal – first place	2019 Moscow	Team
Gold medal – first place	2019 Moscow	Group All-Around
Gold medal – first place	2019 Moscow	5 Hoops
Gold medal – first place	2019 Moscow	5 Ribbons
Junior European Championships
Gold medal – first place	2019 Baku	Team
Gold medal – first place	2019 Baku	Group All-Around
Gold medal – first place	2019 Baku	5 Hoops
Gold medal – first place	2019 Baku	5 Ribbons

Anna Batasova (Russian: Анна Батасова; born October 26, 2004, in Moscow, Russia) is a Russian group rhythmic gymnast. She is the 2019 World Junior Group All-Around, Team, 5 Hoops and 5 Ribbons champion and the 2019 European Junior Group All-Around, Team, 5 Hoops and 5 Ribbons champion.

== Career ==
=== Junior ===
Anna was born in Moscow on October 26, 2004, and began training rhythmic gymnastics at age 4 in her hometown Shchyolkovo. Coach Vera Viktorovna Milova saw potential in her and invited her to train in Dmitrov school. She was a member of Russian Group that competed at the 2019 World Junior Championships in Moscow, Russia taking the gold medal scoring a total of (49.550) ahead of Italy (45.100) and Belarus (43.100) in the all-around competition. They also won gold medals in team competition and in both apparatus finals.

=== Senior ===
In 2020, Anna was added to Russian National Reserve Team as a senior group gymnast. Reserve group took part in Grand Prix Tartu in February. Anna and her teammates placed second in Group All-Around competition after Uzbekistan and took gold medals in both Apparatus Finals. In October, Russian Federation organized 2nd Online Tournament in rhythmic gymnastics, where reserve group won in Group All-Around competition (69.050) in front of Uzbekistan.

She won gold medal in 5 Hoops at the 2024 BRICS Games in Kazan, Russia.
