= Artprice =

French online art database

- Traded as: CAC Small
- Industry: data processing, hosting and related activities

Artprice
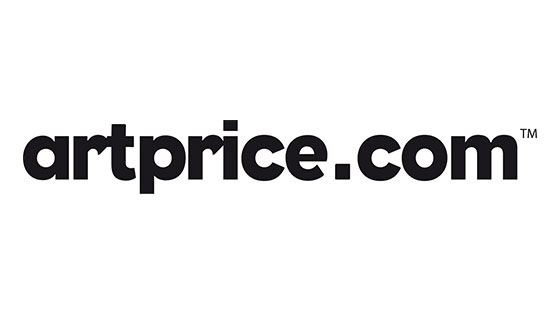
- Type: S.A. (corporation)
- Location: Saint-Romain-au-Mont-d'Or, France
- Founded: 1987
- Key people: Thierry Ehrmann (CEO)
- Currency: EUR
- Website: www.artprice.com

Artprice (Euronext: PRC) is a French online art price Database. It houses millions of art auction records from over 800,000 artists from sales since the 1980's. The database was created by its now CEO Thierry Ehrmann in 1987.

== History ==
Created in 1987 by Thierry Ehrmann, Artprice is a subsidiary company of the Server Group (Groupe Serveur in French). Its website aims to list all artwork from the 17th century to contemporary pieces.

In 2004, Artprice launched a fixed price marketplace for artwork that later led to the creation of an online auction service.

In 2010, Christie's arts auction house sued Artprice for copyright violation of its digital catalog, claiming 63 million euros in commercial prejudice.

In 2014, Artprice redesigned its website and mobile applications and launched a premium fixed price marketplace service.

In February 2015, Artprice executives announced they were seriously considering a merger between an American auction house and their own American subsidiary, Artmarket.com. Later that same year, Artprice denied rumors about their intention to acquire Artnet.com.

== Activities ==
Artprice Images allows unlimited access to a worldwide collection of artworks, counting over 108 million images constantly updated from various auction houses. The company continuously publishes trends in relation to the art market for major art agencies as well as 6300 newspapers worldwide through its press agency, Art Market Insight.

Artprice now counts over 2 million registered users and is traded on NYSE Euronext.
