= Aleksandra Semibratova =

Russian rhythmic gymnast

- Full name: Aleksandra Pavlova Semibratova
- Nickname: Sasha
- Born: 10 December 2004 (age 21) Surgut, Russia

Gymnastics career
- Discipline: Rhythmic gymnastics
- Country represented: Russia (2019-)
- Club: RFSO Lokomotiv
- Head coaches: Yulia Kuzovleva, Natalia Mazur
Medal record
International gymnastics competitions
Event	1st	2nd	3rd
Junior World Championships	4	0	0
Junior European Championships	4	0	0
Total	8	0	0
Rhythmic Gymnastics
Representing Russia
Junior World Championships
Gold medal – first place	2019 Moscow	Team
Gold medal – first place	2019 Moscow	Group All-Around
Gold medal – first place	2019 Moscow	5 Hoops
Gold medal – first place	2019 Moscow	5 Ribbons
Junior European Championships
Gold medal – first place	2019 Baku	Team
Gold medal – first place	2019 Baku	Group All-Around
Gold medal – first place	2019 Baku	5 Hoops
Gold medal – first place	2019 Baku	5 Ribbons

Aleksandra Semibratova (Russian: Александра Семибратова Павлова, born 10 December 2004 in Surgut, Russia) is a Russian group rhythmic gymnast. She is the 2019 World Junior Group All-Around, Team, 5 Hoops and 5 Ribbons champion and the 2019 European Junior Group All-Around, Team, 5 Hoops and 5 Ribbons champion.

== Career ==
=== Junior ===
Aleksandra was born in Surgut on 10 December 2004. She began training in rhythmic gymnastics at age 5. In 2017, she moved to Moscow and began training at the Olympic Reserve School. After participating in a number of training camps and gaining experience, the gymnast performed at the "Hopes of Russia" tournament. She was recognized by Irina Viner, head coach of Russian national team, who invited her to train with junior national team. She was a member of Russian Group that competed at the 2019 World Junior Championships in Moscow, Russia taking the gold medal scoring a total of (49.550) ahead of Italy (45.100) and Belarus (43.100) in the all-around competition. They also won gold medals in team competition and in both apparatus finals.

=== Senior ===
In 2020, Sasha was added to Russian National Reserve Team as a senior group gymnast. Reserve group took part in Grand Prix Tartu in February. Sasha and her teammates placed second in Group All-Around competition after Uzbekistan and took gold medals in both Apparatus Finals. In October, Russian Federation organized 2nd Online Tournament in rhythmic gymnastics, where reserve group won in Group All-Around competition (69.050) in front of Uzbekistan.
