= 2019 Rhythmic Gymnastics European Championships =

- Venue: National Gymnastics Arena
- Location: Baku, Azerbaijan
- Start date: 16 May 2019
- End date: 19 May 2019

The 2019 Rhythmic Gymnastics European Championships was the 35th edition of the Rhythmic Gymnastics European Championships, which took place on 16–19 May 2019 at the National Gymnastics Arena in Baku, Azerbaijan.

== Participating countries ==
- Andorra
- Austria
- Azerbaijan
- Belarus
- Bulgaria
- Croatia
- Cyprus
- Czech Republic
- Spain
- Estonia
- Finland
- France
- Georgia
- Germany
- Greece
- Hungary
- Israel
- Italy
- Latvia
- Lithuania
- Luxembourg
- Moldova
- North Macedonia
- Montenegro
- Norway
- Poland
- Portugal
- Romania
- Russia
- Slovenia
- Serbia
- Switzerland
- Slovakia
- Turkey
- Ukraine

== Medal winners ==
Event	Gold	Silver	Bronze
Team
Team	Russia; Senior Individual; Dina Averina; Arina Averina; Aleksandra Soldatova; Junior Group; Amina Khaldarova; Elizaveta Koteneva; Anna Batasova; Aleksandra Semibratova; Dana Semirenko; Alisa Tishchenko	Belarus; Senior Individual; Katsiaryna Halkina; Alina Harnasko; Anastasiia Salos; Junior Group; Palina Aliaksandrava; Yauheniya Kel; Polina Kovalyova; Viktoriya Padkidysh; Palina Slancheuskaya; Marharyta Yatseuskaya	Bulgaria; Senior Individual; Neviana Vladinova; Katrin Taseva; Boryana Kaleyn; Junior Group; Karina Dimitrova; Zhanina Georgieva; Aleksandra Kyoseva; Yana Momtchilova; Margarita Vasileva; Monika Zarkova
Senior Individual Finals
Hoop	Dina Averina; Russia	Katsiaryna Halkina; Belarus	Nicol Zelikman; Israel
Ball	Arina Averina; Russia	Aleksandra Soldatova; Russia	Boryana Kaleyn; Bulgaria
Clubs	Arina Averina; Russia	Dina Averina; Russia	Vlada Nikolchenko; Ukraine
Ribbon	Dina Averina; Russia	Aleksandra Soldatova; Russia	Boryana Kaleyn; Bulgaria
Junior Group Finals
All-Around	Russia; Amina Khaldarova; Elizaveta Koteneva; Anna Batasova; Aleksandra Semibratova; Dana Semirenko; Alisa Tishchenko	Belarus; Palina Aliaksandrava; Yauheniya Kel; Polina Kovalyova; Viktoriya Padkidysh; Palina Slancheuskaya; Marharyta Yatseuskaya	Italy; Siria Cella; Alessia Leone; Alexandra Naclerio; Serena Ottaviani; Vittoria Quoiani; Giulia Segatori
5 Hoops	Russia; Amina Khaldarova; Elizaveta Koteneva; Anna Batasova; Aleksandra Semibratova; Dana Semirenko; Alisa Tishchenko	Ukraine; Viktoriia Denysenko; Nikol Krasiuk; Alina Melnyk; Oleksandra Panchuk; Daria Shcherbakova; Sofiia Tsybulia	Belarus; Palina Aliaksandrava; Yauheniya Kel; Polina Kovalyova; Viktoriya Padkidysh; Palina Slancheuskaya; Marharyta Yatseuskaya
5 Ribbons	Russia; Amina Khaldarova; Elizaveta Koteneva; Anna Batasova; Aleksandra Semibratova; Dana Semirenko; Alisa Tishchenko	Israel; Amit Hedvat; Emili Malka; Mishel Mialitz; Romi Paritzki; Diana Svertsov	Belarus; Palina Aliaksandrava; Yauheniya Kel; Polina Kovalyova; Viktoriya Padkidysh; Palina Slancheuskaya; Marharyta Yatseuskaya

== Results ==
=== Team ===
Rank	Nation	Hoop (rhythmic gymnastics)	Ball (rhythmic gymnastics)	Clubs (rhythmic gymnastics)	Ribbon (rhythmic gymnastics)	5	5	Total
1st place, gold medalist(s)	Russia	41.025	43.575	46.175	40.525	21.225	23.700	216.225
2nd place, silver medalist(s)	Belarus	42.650	41.600	41.650	38.050	18.950	23.100	206.000
3rd place, bronze medalist(s)	Bulgaria	42.050	43.700	41.775	38.700	15.700	20.150	202.075
4	Italy	37.600	38.650	40.000	35.150	18.300	23.050	192.750
5	Ukraine	38.650	36.500	40.650	34.900	18.450	21.800	190.950
6	Azerbaijan	38.300	37.450	39.600	31.375	17.300	21.650	185.675
7	Spain	36.075	35.900	38.000	34.625	17.300	21.400	183.300
8	Romania	37.350	38.000	37.800	32.300	10.800	17.700	173.950
9	Finland	36.850	33.150	35.850	31.750	16.700	18.450	172.750
10	Hungary	34.425	35.350	35.400	30.050	15.350	18.350	168.925
11	Georgia	33.350	36.200	37.050	30.350	14.350	16.750	168.050
12	Greece	35.325	35.400	35.600	30.250	11.100	18.275	165.950
13	Lithuania	28.850	33.600	31.250	30.250	17.325	20.725	162.000
14	Estonia	29.250	31.300	35.700	28.950	15.350	21.400	161.950
15	Czech Republic	31.050	32.950	34.700	24.850	14.200	16.100	153.850
16	Poland	33.400	29.925	30.050	23.900	15.250	17.750	150.275
17	Norway	26.200	28.400	31.650	27.100	13.100	17.550	144.000

=== Senior Individual ===
==== Hoop ====
Rank	Gymnast	Nation	D Score	E Score	Pen.	Total
1st place, gold medalist(s)	Dina Averina	Russia	14.1	9.200		23.300
2nd place, silver medalist(s)	Katsiaryna Halkina	Belarus	12.1	9.050		21.150
3rd place, bronze medalist(s)	Nicol Zelikman	Israel	12.2	8.750		20.950
4	Neviana Vladinova	Bulgaria	12.2	8.500		20.700
5	Anastasiia Salos	Belarus	12.5	8.100		20.600
6	Zohra Aghamirova	Azerbaijan	11.6	8.275		19.875
7	Boryana Kaleyn	Bulgaria	12.1	7.600		19.700
8	Vlada Nikolchenko	Ukraine	9.6	5.600	-0.600	14.600

==== Ball ====
Rank	Gymnast	Nation	D Score	E Score	Pen.	Total
1st place, gold medalist(s)	Arina Averina	Russia	13.5	9.350		22.850
2nd place, silver medalist(s)	Aleksandra Soldatova	Russia	12.9	9.150		22.050
3rd place, bronze medalist(s)	Boryana Kaleyn	Bulgaria	13.1	8.700		21.800
4	Katsiaryna Halkina	Belarus	12.5	8.900		21.400
5	Nicol Zelikman	Israel	12.4	8.775		21.175
6	Milena Baldassarri	Italy	12.0	8.400		20.400
7	Katrin Taseva	Bulgaria	12.2	7.300		19.500
8	Alina Harnasko	Belarus	11.6	7.200		18.800

==== Clubs ====
Rank	Gymnast	Nation	D Score	E Score	Pen.	Total
1st place, gold medalist(s)	Arina Averina	Russia	13.9	9.300		23.200
2nd place, silver medalist(s)	Dina Averina	Russia	13.7	9.250		22.950
3rd place, bronze medalist(s)	Vlada Nikolchenko	Ukraine	13.5	8.975		22.475
4	Katrin Taseva	Bulgaria	13.0	8.150		21.150
5	Anastasiia Salos	Belarus	12.1	8.900		21.000
6	Nicol Zelikman	Israel	12.2	8.750		20.950
7	Ekaterina Vedeneeva	Slovenia	11.9	8.400		20.300
8	Zohra Aghamirova	Azerbaijan	10.9	8.050		18.950

==== Ribbon ====
Rank	Gymnast	Nation	D Score	E Score	Pen.	Total
1st place, gold medalist(s)	Dina Averina	Russia	11.3	9.100		20.400
2nd place, silver medalist(s)	Aleksandra Soldatova	Russia	11.1	9.200		20.300
3rd place, bronze medalist(s)	Boryana Kaleyn	Bulgaria	11.0	8.750		19.750
4	Anastasiia Salos	Belarus	11.0	8.500		19.500
5	Nicol Zelikman	Israel	10.7	8.600		19.300
6	Katsiaryna Halkina	Belarus	9.9	8.550		18.450
7	Milena Baldassarri	Italy	10.0	7.950		17.950
8	Katrin Taseva	Bulgaria	9.9	7.850		17.750

=== Junior Group ===
==== 5 Ribbons ====
Rank	Nation	D Score	E Score	Pen.	Total
1st place, gold medalist(s)	Russia	12.5	8.500	0.000	21.000
2nd place, silver medalist(s)	Israel	11.8	8.100	0.000	19.900
3rd place, bronze medalist(s)	Belarus	11.9	7.100	0.000	19.000
4	Spain	10.7	7.500	0.000	18.200
5	Italy	10.2	6.100	0.000	16.300
6	Ukraine	9.4	6.150	0.000	15.550
7	Lithuania	9.9	4.950	0.000	14.850
8	Switzerland	9.7	5.450	-0.600	14.550

==== 5 Hoops ====
Rank	Nation	D Score	E Score	Pen.	Total
1st place, gold medalist(s)	Russia	16.1	8.350	0.000	24.450
2nd place, silver medalist(s)	Ukraine	15.8	7.600	0.000	23.400
3rd place, bronze medalist(s)	Belarus	15.5	7.750	0.000	23.250
4	Italy	15.5	7.400	0.000	22.900
5	Estonia	15.5	7.050	0.000	22.550
6	Azerbaijan	14.8	6.700	0.000	21.500
7	Spain	12.9	7.075	0.000	19.975
8	Lithuania	11.9	6.200	-0.300	17.800

== Medal count ==
Pos.	Country	Gold	Silver	Bronze	Total
1	Russia	8	3	0	11
2	Belarus	0	3	2	5
3	Israel	0	1	1	2
3	Ukraine	0	1	1	2
5	Bulgaria	0	0	3	3
6	Italy	0	0	1	1
