= Palina Slancheuskaya =

Belarusian rhythmic gymnast

- Born: January 23, 2006 (age 20) Minsk, Belarus

Gymnastics career
- Discipline: Rhythmic gymnastics
- Country represented: Belarus (2019-)
- Club: Republican Centre of Olympic Preparation
- Head coaches: Marina Lobatch, Irina Lagunova
Medal record
International gymnastics competitions
Event	1st	2nd	3rd
Junior World Championships	0	1	2
Junior European Championships	0	2	3
Total	0	3	5
Rhythmic Gymnastics
Representing Belarus
Junior World Championships
Silver medal – second place	2019 Moscow	5 Ribbons
Bronze medal – third place	2019 Moscow	Group All-Around
Bronze medal – third place	2019 Moscow	5 Hoops
Junior European Championships
Silver medal – second place	2019 Baku	Team
Silver medal – second place	2019 Baku	Group All-Around
Bronze medal – third place	2021 Varna	5 Balls
Bronze medal – third place	2019 Baku	5 Hoops
Bronze medal – third place	2019 Baku	5 Ribbons

Palina Slancheuskaya (Belarusian: Паліна Сланчэўская, born January 23, 2006, in Minsk, Belarus) is a Belarusian group rhythmic gymnast. She is the 2019 World Junior Group All-Around bronze medalist and the 2019 European Junior Group All-Around silver medalist.

== Career ==
=== Junior ===
Palina was born in Minsk on January 23, 2006. She began training in rhythmic gymnastics at age 5. She was a member of Belarusian Group that competed at the 2019 World Junior Championships in Moscow, Russia taking the bronze medal in Group All-around event scoring a total of (43.100) behind Italy (45.100) and Russia (49.550). They also won silver medal in 5 Ribbons final and bronze in 5 Hoops final.

In 2020, she started competing as individual again. She was a member of Belarusian team together with Dina Agisheva and Yelyzaveta Zorkina that competed at the 2020 Junior European Championships in Kyiv, Ukraine. She finished on 4th place in Rope Qualifications and 3rd place in Ribbon Qualifications, but did not advance into apparatus finals due to one per country rule.

In 2021, she returened to competing in group. She took part in 2021 Junior European Championships in Varna, Bulgaria, where she and Belarusian group took bronze medal in 5 Balls final. They took 5th place in Group All-around event and 4th place in 5 Ribbons final.
