= Ehrman =

Ehrman is a surname. Notable persons with the name include:

- Bart D. Ehrman (born 1955), American Biblical scholar
- John Ehrman (1920–2011), British historian
- Lee Ehrman (born 1935), American geneticist
- Marli Ehrman (1904–1982), German-American textile artist
- Riccardo Ehrman (1929–2021), Italian journalist
- Sara Ehrman (1919–2017), American political activist
- William Ehrman (born 1950), retired British diplomat and intelligence officer

== See also ==
- Ehrman Syme Nadal (1843–1922), American journalist and writer
- Ehrmann (surname)
