= Jelisaveta =

Jelisaveta (Serbian: Јелисавета) is a given name that may refer to:

- Jelisaveta of Hungary, Queen of Serbia (d. 1313)
- Jelisaveta Nemanjić, Princess of Serbia and Bosnia (d. 1331)
- Jelisaveta, monastic name of Serbian Empress Jelena (d. 1374)
- Jelisaveta Kotromanić, Princess of Bosnia, Queen of Hungary (d. 1387)
- Jelisaveta, Princess of Serbia and Yugoslavia (b. 1936)
- Jelisaveta Načić (1878-1955)
- Jelisaveta Sablić (b. 1942)
- Jelisaveta Veljković (1951–2023)
- Jelisaveta Orašanin (b. 1988)

== See also ==
- Elizabeth (given name)
- Elizabeth (disambiguation)
- Elizaveta (disambiguation)
- Elisaveta (disambiguation)
