= Ehrmann =

Ehrmann is a German surname. Notable people with the surname include:

- Aleksandar Ehrmann (1879–1965), Croatian industrialist, philanthropist and diplomat
- Eric Ehrmann (born 1946), American author
- Gerry Ehrmann (born 1959), German football player and coach
- Jacques Ehrmann (1931–1972), French literary theorist
- Joe Ehrmann (born 1949), American football player
- Kurt Ehrmann (1922–2013), German football player
- Marianne Ehrmann (1755–1795), German novelist and publicist
- Max Ehrmann (1872–1945), American poet
- Paul Ehrmann (1868–1937), German malacologist
- Salomon Ehrmann (1854–1926), Austrian dermatologist and histologist
- Thierry Ehrmann (born 1962), French entrepreneur and artist

== See also ==
- Stade Charles-Ehrmann, football stadium in Nice, France
- Ehrman, a similar name
