= Muhammet Özdin =

Turkish footballer

Personal information
- Full name: Muhammet Özdin
- Date of birth: September 10, 1978 (age 48)
- Place of birth: Vakfıkebir, Trabzon, Turkey
- Height: 1.83 m (6 ft 0 in)
- Position: Defender

Youth career
- Trabzonspor

Senior career*
Years	Team	Apps	(Gls)
1997–1999	Trabzonspor	0	(0)
1999	Sakaryaspor	0	(0)
1999–2000	→ Çorluspor (loan)	13	(0)
2000	Altay	1	(0)
2001	Akçaabat Sebatspor	12	(0)
2001–2002	Siirtspor	34	(6)
2002–2003	Erzurumspor	26	(1)
2003–2005	Akçaabat Sebatspor	24	(1)
2005–2008	Kocaelispor	63	(2)
2009–2013	Karabükspor	78	(4)
2013	Boluspor	13	(0)
2013–2014	Karşıyaka	12	(0)
2014–2015	Arsinspor	7	(0)
- * Club domestic league appearances and goals as of 6 September 2015

Muhammet Özdin (born September 10, 1978 in Vakfıkebir, Turkey) is a Turkish football defender. He played for three teams in the Süper Lig: he played for Akçaabat Sebatspor from 2003 to 2005, for Kocaelispor from 2008 to 2009, and for Kardemir Karabükspor from 2010 to 2013.
