= 2019 Junior World Rhythmic Gymnastics Championships =

Rhythmic gymnastics competition

1st Rhythmic Gymnastics Junior World Championships
- Venue: Irina Viner-Usmanova Gymnastics Palace
- Location: Moscow, Russia
- Start date: 19 July 2019
- End date: 21 July 2019
- Competitors: 322 from 61 nations

The 2019 Rhythmic Gymnastics Junior World Championships were the inaugural Rhythmic Gymnastics Junior World Championships. They were held in Moscow, Russia, from 19 July to 21 July 2019.

Following the success of the event, which was measured by the amount of participating nations, The Executive Committee of the International Gymnastics Federation has announced the addition of the junior competitions to the official sporting calendar, which will take place every two years, in odd years. The next competition was going to be held in 2021, the covid-19 pandemic has postponed it to 2023.

== Participating nations ==
- Armenia (8)
- Australia (7)
- Austria (7)
- Azerbaijan (7)
- Belgium (2)
- Belarus (9)
- Bolivia (2)
- Brazil (10)
- Bulgaria (9)
- Canada (8)
- China (1)
- Colombia (3)
- Cape Verde (1)
- Croatia (2)
- Cyprus (2)
- Denmark (1)
- Egypt (9)
- Spain (9)
- Estonia (7)
- Finland (8)
- France (3)
- Great Britain (2)
- Georgia (7)
- Germany (7)
- Greece (9)
- Hong Kong (2)
- Hungary (9)
- Indonesia (1)
- Israel (9)
- Italy (7)
- Japan (7)
- Kazakhstan (7)
- Kyrgyzstan (4)
- South Korea (4)
- Latvia (4)
- Lebanon (3)
- Lithuania (7)
- Malaysia (9)
- Moldova (8)
- Mexico (3)
- Mongolia (9)
- Montenegro (2)
- Norway (8)
- New Zealand (2)
- Philippines (2)
- Poland (8)
- Portugal (2)
- Puerto Rico (2)
- Romania (7)
- South Africa (1)
- Russia (10)
- Singapore (8)
- Slovenia (1)
- San Marino (2)
- Serbia (1)
- Slovakia (7)
- Thailand (1)
- Turkey (3)
- Ukraine (7)
- United States (8)
- Uzbekistan (7)

== Medal winners ==
Event	Gold	Silver	Bronze
Team Competition
Team All-Around	Russia Individual: Lala Kramarenko; Dariia Sergaeva; Anastasia Simakova Group: Anna Batasova; Amina Khaldarova; Elizaveta Koteneva; Aleksandra Semibratova; Dana Semirenko; Alisa Tishchenko	Italy Individual: Sofia Raffaeli Group: Siria Cella; Alessia Leone; Alexandra Naclerio; Serena Ottaviani; Vittoria Quoiani; Giulia Segatori	Israel Individual: Noga Block; Adi Asya Katz; Sonia Leyfman Group: Amit Hedvat; Emili Malka; Mishel Mihailetz; Romi Paritzki; Diana Svertsov
Individual Finals
Rope	Anastasia Simakova (RUS)	Sofia Raffaeli (ITA)	Arzu Jalilova (AZE)
Ball	Lala Kramarenko (RUS)	Arzu Jalilova (AZE)	Noga Block (ISR)
Clubs	Lala Kramarenko (RUS)	Sofia Raffaeli (ITA)	Adi Asya Katz (ISR)
Ribbon	Dariia Sergaeva (RUS)	Adi Asya Katz (ISR)	Salma Solaun (ESP)
Groups Finals
All-Around	Russia; Anna Batasova; Amina Khaldarova; Elizaveta Koteneva; Aleksandra Semibratova; Dana Semirenko; Alisa Tishchenko	Italy; Siria Cella; Alessia Leone; Alexandra Naclerio; Serena Ottaviani; Vittoria Quoiani; Giulia Segatori	Belarus; Palina Aliaksandrava; Yauheniya Kel; Polina Kovalyova; Viktoryia Padkidysh; Palina Slancheuskaya; Marharyta Yatseuskaya
5 hoops	Russia; Anna Batasova; Amina Khaldarova; Elizaveta Koteneva; Aleksandra Semibratova; Dana Semirenko; Alisa Tishchenko	Italy; Siria Cella; Alessia Leone; Alexandra Naclerio; Serena Ottaviani; Vittoria Quoiani; Giulia Segatori	Belarus; Palina Aliaksandrava; Yauheniya Kel; Polina Kovalyova; Viktoryia Padkidysh; Palina Slancheuskaya; Marharyta Yatseuskaya
5 ribbons	Russia; Anna Batasova; Amina Khaldarova; Elizaveta Koteneva; Aleksandra Semibratova; Dana Semirenko; Alisa Tishchenko	Belarus; Palina Aliaksandrava; Yauheniya Kel; Polina Kovalyova; Viktoryia Padkidysh; Palina Slancheuskaya; Marharyta Yatseuskaya	Israel; Amit Hedvat; Emili Malka; Mishel Mihailetz; Romi Paritzki; Diana Svertsov

== Individual ==
=== Team ===
Rank	Nation	Total
1st place, gold medalist(s)	Russia	131.150
2nd place, silver medalist(s)	Italy	119.100
3rd place, bronze medalist(s)	Israel	113.800
4	Belarus	111.250
5	Azerbaijan	105.400
6	Hungary	102.000
7	Spain	101.000
8	Bulgaria	100.600
9	Greece	98.125
10	Lithuania	97.350
11	Uzbekistan	96.650
12	Estonia	96.150
13	Kazakhstan	96.100
14	Poland	95.800
15	Germany	95.475
16	Ukraine	95.250
17	Japan	92.125
18	Finland	92.050
19	Georgia	91.400
20	United States	91.075
21	Romania	90.000
22	Canada	88.200
23	Egypt	85.350
24	Slovakia	82.625
25	Moldova	81.850
26	Brazil	81.500
27	Malaysia	80.325
28	Austria	77.650
29	Australia	76.500
30	Norway	72.900
31	Armenia	65.375
32	Mongolia	62.150

=== Rope ===
Rank	Gymnast	Nation	D Score	E Score	Total
1st place, gold medalist(s)	Anastasia Simakova	Russia	11.400	9.200	20.600
2nd place, silver medalist(s)	Sofia Raffaeli	Italy	10.700	8.350	19.050
3rd place, bronze medalist(s)	Arzu Jalilova	Azerbaijan	9.000	8.400	17.400
4	Elzhana Taniyeva	Kazakhstan	9.100	8.100	17.200
5	Sonia Leyfman	Israel	8.900	8.250	17.150
6	Eva Brezalieva	Bulgaria	8.400	7.150	15.550
7	Darya Tkatcheva	Belarus	7.600	7.300	14.900
8	Garam Kim	South Korea	7.800	6.950	14.750

=== Ball ===
Rank	Gymnast	Nation	D Score	E Score	Total
1st place, gold medalist(s)	Lala Kramarenko	Russia	12.400	9.125	21.525
2nd place, silver medalist(s)	Arzu Jalilova	Azerbaijan	10.800	8.400	19.200
3rd place, bronze medalist(s)	Noga Block	Israel	10.800	8.150	18.950
4	Arina Krasnorutskaia	Belarus	10.200	8.275	18.475
5	Polina Murashko	Estonia	10.300	7.950	18.250
6	Laura Anitei	Romania	10.400	7.750	18.150
7	Sabina Bakatova	Kazakhstan	9.900	7.850	17.750
8	Sofia Raffaeli	Italy	10.100	7.350	17.450

=== Clubs ===
Rank	Gymnast	Nation	D Score	E Score	Total
1st place, gold medalist(s)	Lala Kramarenko	Russia	11.800	8.950	20.750
2nd place, silver medalist(s)	Sofia Raffaeli	Italy	11.300	8.150	19.450
3rd place, bronze medalist(s)	Adi Asya Katz	Israel	11.000	8.250	19.250
4	Polina Murashko	Estonia	9.700	8.350	18.050
5	Nikol Krasiuk	Ukraine	10.100	7.750	17.850
6	Yosmina Rakhimova	Uzbekistan	10.400	7.250	17.650
7	Narmina Samadova	Azerbaijan	8.800	7.900	16.700
8	Darya Tkatcheva	Belarus	8.800	7.250	16.050

=== Ribbon ===
Rank	Gymnast	Nation	D Score	E Score	Total
1st place, gold medalist(s)	Dariia Sergaeva	Russia	9.200	8.450	17.650
2nd place, silver medalist(s)	Adi Asya Katz	Israel	9.000	8.100	17.100
3rd place, bronze medalist(s)	Salma Solaun	Spain	8.900	7.850	16.750
4	Valeria Vatova	Bulgaria	9.000	7.250	16.250
5	Narmina Samadova	Azerbaijan	8.600	7.225	15.825
6	Evelin Viktoria Kocsis	Hungary	8.300	7.350	15.650
7	Sofia Raffaeli	Italy	8.400	6.250	14.650
8	Mirano Kita	Japan	7.700	6.750	14.450

== Group ==
=== All-Around ===
The top 8 scores in the apparatus qualifies to the group apparatus finals.

Place	Nation	5	5	Total
1st place, gold medalist(s)	Russia	26.900	22.650	49.550
2nd place, silver medalist(s)	Italy	25.000	20.100	45.100
3rd place, bronze medalist(s)	Belarus	25.100	18.000	43.100
4	Israel	22.700	19.600	42.300
5	Spain	22.250	16.850	39.100
6	Hungary	21.650	16.750	38.400
7	Lithuania	20.050	17.300	37.350
8	Azerbaijan	20.900	16.400	37.300
9	Greece	20.550	16.200	36.750
10	Germany	19.800	16.150	35.950
11	Poland	19.200	16.750	35.950
12	Bulgaria	19.450	16.450	35.900
13	Finland	20.300	15.050	35.350
14	Estonia	21.450	13.400	34.850
15	Japan	18.100	16.425	34.525
16	Ukraine	18.075	16.325	34.400
17	Uzbekistan	17.100	16.200	33.300
18	Kazakhstan	17.550	15.400	32.950
19	United States	17.175	14.300	31.475
20	Georgia	16.550	14.300	30.850
21	Canada	15.900	14.450	30.350
22	Austria	15.050	13.850	28.900
23	Norway	15.650	13.100	28.750
24	Romania	17.000	10.500	28.200
25	Egypt	17.000	11.050	28.050
26	Malaysia	15.025	12.100	27.125
27	Slovakia	14.150	12.700	26.850
28	Brazil	14.750	11.550	26.300
29	Moldova	13.700	11.300	25.000
30	Australia	13.300	9.200	22.500
31	Armenia	9.675	8.450	18.125
32	Mongolia	10.150	7.600	17.750
33	Singapore	12.350	-	12.350

=== 5 Hoops ===
Rank	Nation	D Score	E Score	Pen.	Total
1st place, gold medalist(s)	Russia	17.600	8.650		26.250
2nd place, silver medalist(s)	Italy	17.200	7.900		25.100
3rd place, bronze medalist(s)	Belarus	16.800	7.850		24.650
4	Israel	16.000	6.300		22.300
5	Spain	14.500	7.450		21.950
6	Estonia	14.700	6.750		21.450
7	Azerbaijan	13.400	6.550		19.950
8	Hungary	13.100	6.150	-0.30	18.950

=== 5 Ribbons ===
Rank	Nation	D Score	E Score	Pen.	Total
1st place, gold medalist(s)	Russia	13.400	8.050		21.450
2nd place, silver medalist(s)	Belarus	12.400	7.150		19.550
3rd place, bronze medalist(s)	Israel	11.600	7.400		19.000
4	Spain	9.800	6.300	-0.05	16.050
5	Poland	9.700	5.950	-0.60	15.050
6	Lithuania	9.700	5.350		15.050
7	Hungary	10.100	4.650		14.750
8	Italy	10.100	4.700	-0.30	14.500

== Medal table ==
Rank	Nation	Gold	Silver	Bronze	Total
1	Russia	8	0	0	8
2	Italy	0	5	0	5
3	Israel	0	1	4	5
4	Belarus	0	1	2	3
5	Azerbaijan	0	1	1	2
6	Spain	0	0	1	1
Totals (6 entries)		8	8	8	24
