= Elizaveta Klyuchereva =

Russian pianist (born 1999)

- Елизавета Евгеньевна Ключерева
- Born: 27 May 1999 (age 26); Moscow, Russia
- Occupation: Pianist

Elizaveta Klyuchereva (Елизавета Ключерева, born 1999) is a Russian pianist who began studying music at the age of six. In 2006, she became a student at the music school of the Moscow Conservatory. She is a winner of more than 20 competitions.

== Biography ==
Born on 27 May 1999, in Moscow, Russia, Elizaveta Klyuchereva has studied music since she was six, first with Manana Kandelaky and later with Alexander Strukov and Kira Shashkina at the Central Music School of Moscow's State Conservatory where, as of January 2016, she is in the tenth grade . She has performed in Russia, Germany, China, CZ Republic, England, America, Ukraine, Denmark, France, and Italy and has been awarded five Grand Prizes. Orchestras she has performed with include the Moscow Chamber Orchestra, and the Kharkiv Symphony Orchestra. She has received support from the Yamaha Music Foundation and the Vladimir Spivakov International Charity Foundation.

== Awards ==
Since 2010, Klyuchereva has received many awards, including:

- 2010: Scriabin International Piano Competition, Paris, France, 1st prize
- 2012: XI International Vladimir Krainev Young Pianists Competition, Kharkiv, Ukraine, 3rd prize
- 2012: VII Villuan International Young Pianists Competition, Nizhniy Novgorod, Russia, 1st Prize and Grand Prix
- 2012: VI A. Artobolevskaya International Competition for Young Pianists, Moscow, Grand Prix
- 2012: Music Without Limits, Lithuania, Grand Prix
- 2013: Aarhus International Piano Competition, Aarhus, Denmark, 3rd prize
- 2013: VI Young Pianists Competition of the North, Newcastle, England, 1st Prize
- 2013: IX International Piano Festival Competition for Children and Youth, Villahermosa, Mexico, 1st Prize
- 2014: Virtuosi per musica di pianoforte, Ústí nad Labem, Czech Republic, Grand Prix
- 2015: Aarhus International Piano Competition, Aarhus, Denmark, 3rd prize
- 2015: IX International Tchaikovsky Competition for Young Musicians, Novosibirsk, Russia, 2nd prize

2016 - Elizaveta has received First Prize at the Concertino Praga Competition.

2016 - Elizaveta has received II Prize and silver medal at Arthur Rubinstein Youth Piano Competition, Beijing, China.
