= Martha Ertman =

US law professor

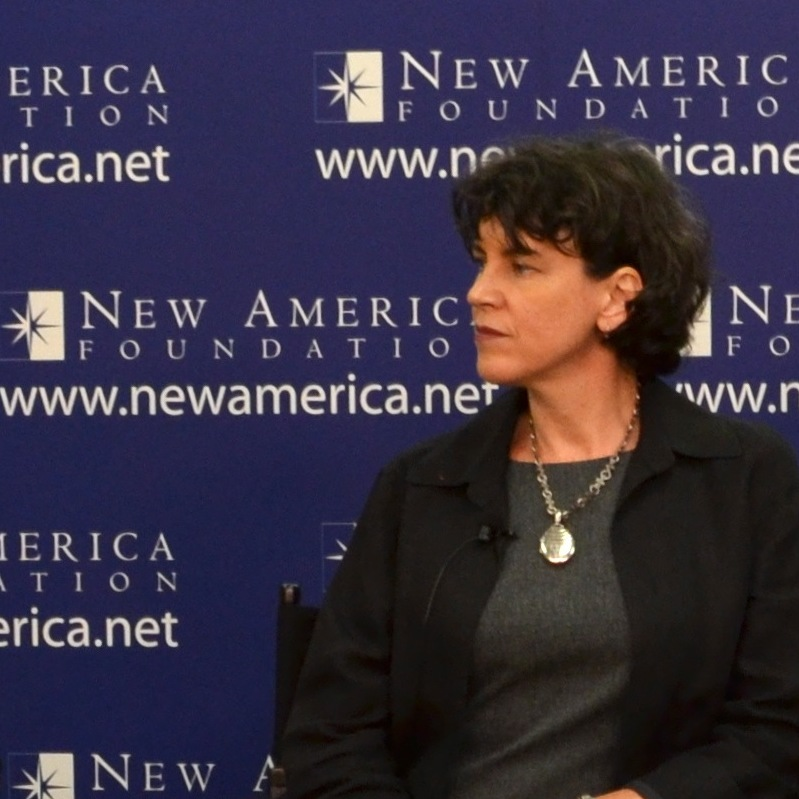
- in 2010
- Born: August 25, 1963 (age 62); Wellesley, Massachusetts
- Occupations: Law professor and writer
- Known for: Writing
- Partner: Karen Lash + 2
- Children: Oscar Ertman

Martha Ertman (born August 25, 1963) is an American US law professor. She is the Carole & Hanan Sibel Research Professor of Law at the University of Maryland's Francis King Carey School of Law. She is an expert in family law and writes about contracts within relationships using her own family of four parents and a child as an example.

== Life ==
Ertman was raised in Virginia. She and her siblings were raised in Wellesley where her mother edited "Wellesley Magazine", taught and her father, Gardner Ertman, who was an architect designed their house, and the local library.

Ertman gained degrees at Wellesley and at Northwestern University. She worked in Louisiana as a legal clerk for a District Court judge and a lawyer in Seattle. She entered academica as a visiting law faculty member at the University of Michigan, the University of Connecticut and University of Oregon. She also laught law at the University of Utah and the University of Denver.

In 2007 she moved to join the University of Maryland's Francis King Carey School of Law.

She married in 2009 to Karen Lash who she had met in 2006. She has a son named Oscar. Her wife was a legal consultant who had been an associate dean in a law school. Her 2015 book, Love's Promises: How Formal and Informal Contracts Shape All Kinds of Families includes a description of this relationship between her son, his father and her wife. She defines the three of them living as joint parents as a "Plan B" family joined together by affection and contracts. The book was named the Love’s Family Equality Council’s 2015 Book Club Pick and attracted attention in the press. The book was covered by the Washingtonian and Time magazine.

She is the Carole & Hanan Sibel Research Professor of Law at the University of Maryland's Francis King Carey School of Law.

== Works include ==
- Rethinking Commodification: Cases and Readings in Law and Culture, 2005
- Love's Promises: How Formal and Informal Contracts Shape All Kinds of Families, 2015
- Developing Professional Skills: Secured Transactions, 2018
- Contract Law: An Integrated Approach (co-author), 2020
