= Vakfıkebir =

- District and municipality
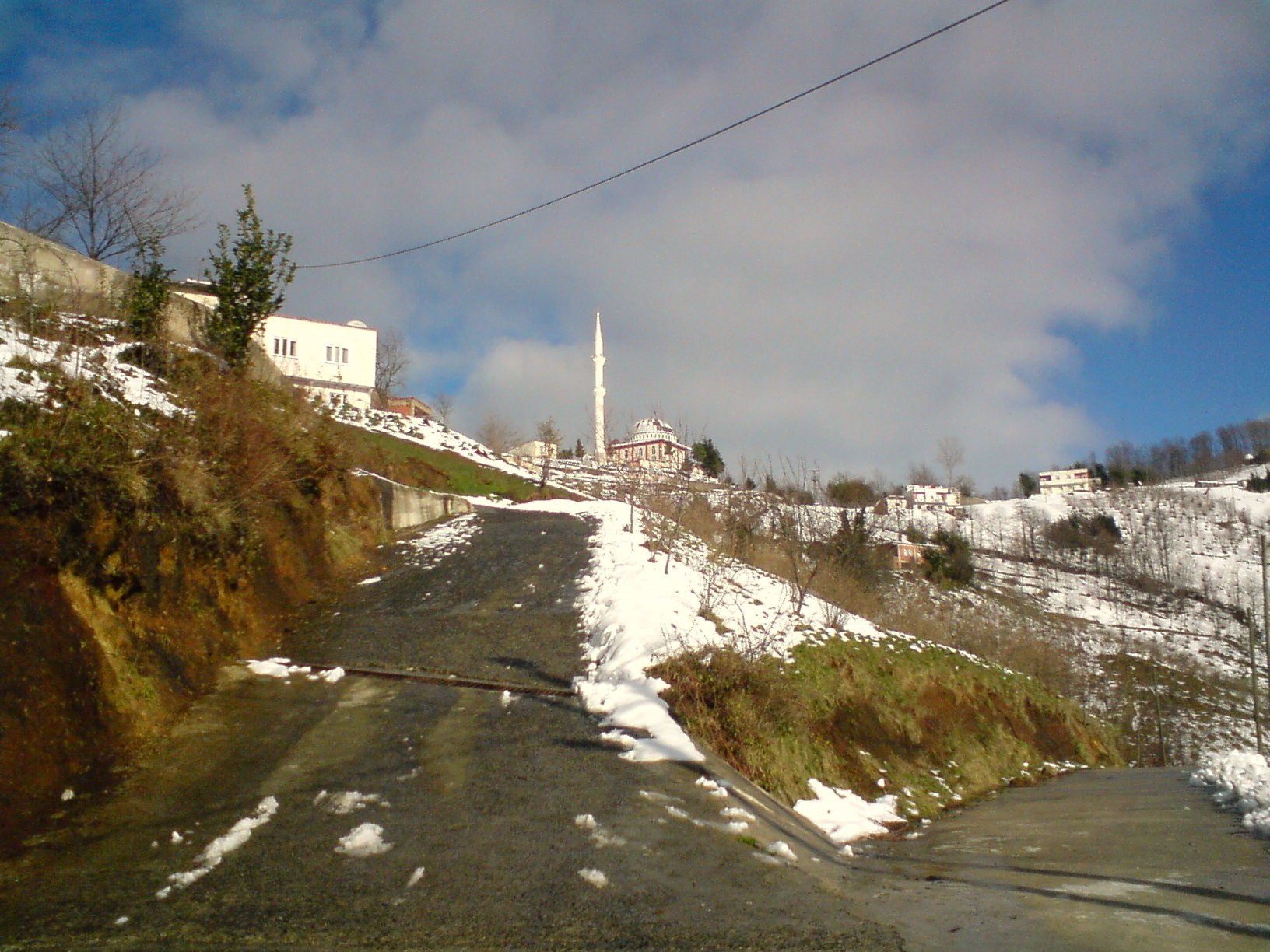
- The village İshaklı

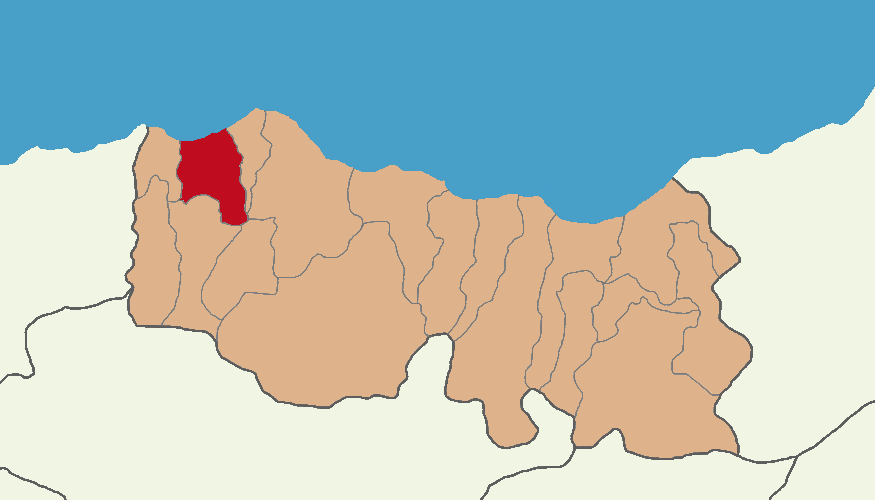
- Map showing Vakfıkebir District in Trabzon Province

- Location within Turkey
- Coordinates: 41°2′51″N 39°16′47″E
- Country: Turkey
- Province: Trabzon

Government
  - Mayor: Fuat Koçal (AKP)
- Area: 141 km^{2} (54 sq mi)
- Population (2022): 27,060
  - Density: 192/km^{2} (497/sq mi)
- Time zone: UTC+3 (TRT)
- Postal code: 61400
- Area code: 0462
- Climate: Cfa
- Website: www.vakfikebir.bel.tr

Vakfıkebir (Turkish: [vakfɯceˈbiɾ]) is a municipality and district of Trabzon Province, Turkey. Its area is 141 km^{2}, and its population is 27,060 (2022). On 31 March 2024, Fuat Koçal (Independent) was elected mayor.

== Composition ==
There are 46 neighbourhoods in Vakfıkebir District:

- Açıkalan
- Akköy
- Aydoğdu
- Bahadırlı
- Ballı
- Bozalan
- Büyükliman
- Caferli
- Çamlık
- Çamlık Sahil
- Çarşı
- Çavuşlu
- Cumhuriyet
- Demirci
- Deregözü
- Düzlük
- Esentepe
- Fethiye
- Fevziye
- Güneyköy
- Güneysu
- Hacıköy
- Hamzalı
- Hürriyet
- İlyaslı
- İshaklı
- Karatepe
- Kemaliye
- Kıranköy
- Kirazlık
- Kirazlık Yeni
- Köprücek
- Körez
- Küçükdere
- Mahmutlu
- Mısırlı
- Ortaköy
- Rıdvanlı
- Sekmenli
- Şenocak
- Sinanlı
- Soğuksu
- Tarlacık
- Yalıköy
- Yaylacık
- Yıldız

== Cuisine of Vakfıkebir ==
- Vakfıkebir bread
- Vakfıkebir butter (Vakfıkebir tereyağı)

== Notable natives ==
- Volkan Bekçi (1987– ), footballer
- Tayfun Cora (1983– ), footballer of Trabzonspor
- Dilek İmamoğlu (1978– ), lecturer, wife of Ekrem İmamoğlu
- Rahman Oğuz Kobya (1988– ), footballer of Adanaspor
- Erman Öncü (1976– ), retired footballer, currently scholar for physical education and sports at the Black Sea Technical University
- Muhammet Özdin (1978– ), footballer
- Osman Şirin (1943– ), former justice of the High Court of Appeals of Turkey
- Necip Torumtay (1926–2011), former Chief of the General Staff of Turkey
