= Erman Öncü =

Turkish academic and footballer (born 1976)

Personal information
- Date of birth: 13 October 1976 (age 50)
- Place of birth: Vakfikebir, Trabzon, Turkey
- Height: 1.82 m (6 ft 0 in)
- Positions: Attacking midfielder; left winger

Youth career
- 1986–1993: A. Sebatspor
- 1993–1995: Trabzonspor

Senior career*
Years	Team	Apps	(Gls)
1995–1997	Trabzonspor	0	(0)
1996	→ A. Sebatspor (loan)	8	(0)
1996–97	→ A. Sebatspor (loan)	24	(5)
1997–98	A. Sebatspor	20	(3)
1998	Elazığspor	0	(0)
Total		52	(8)

International career
- Turkey
- * Club domestic league appearances and goals

Erman Öncü (born 13 October 1976) is a Turkish academic professor and former professional footballer. He is vice-chair of Physical Education and Sports Psychology at the Karadeniz Technical University, School of Physical Education and Sports. As a footballer, he had spells with Trabzonspor, Akçaabat Sebatspor and Elazığspor.

== Football career ==
Being raised in the ranks of Akçaabat Sebatspor youth academy, he soon attracted the interests of sports authorities in Trabzon. His excellent playmaking and dribbling skills, and his ability to use both feet and flanks proved him an excellent prospect. He was transferred to Trabzonspor youth academy, and soon signed a professional contract, however, then-coach Şenol Güneş never gave him a chance to play for the senior team. He was soon loaned out to his hometown team of Akçaabat Sebatspor. There he became the favourite of the local fans and spent 2,5 years helping the team's success. In the summer of 1998, he signed a contract with Elazığspor who then played in Türk Telekom League A. Without being able to play a single official game for the team, he got another offer from A. Sebatspor. He mutually terminated his contract with Elazığspor, given the promise by A. Sebatspor board of directors that they would compensate Elazığspor's financial loss. They never did. Angered by this move, Elazığspor set an astronomical fee for Erman, although his contract was ended. Until Bosman rule came into effect in Turkey, Erman was not able to sign with any professional football clubs who showed an interest for his skills. Feeling betrayed by both teams, he distanced himself from professional football that showed him its dark side. When he was eventually freed from his contract burden, he was already out of hopes and will for playing professional again.

== Academic career ==
Erman Öncü started his academic career at the Department of Mechanical Engineering in Karadeniz Technical University while still playing football. He left the department for studying Physical Education which would be more compatible with his football career. After completing his degree in Physical Education at Karadeniz Technical University in 1999, he became a research assistant at the same department teaching undergraduate classes. He left for Gazi University, Ankara for doctoral studies in 2003 where he published several articles. Coming back to Trabzon with a Ph.D. in Physical Education, he gained his tenure at the School of Physical Education and Sports, Karadeniz Technical University in 2008. Currently he is teaching the undergraduate courses of Sports Psychology, Sports Philosophy and the Olympic Spirit, Football, Football Teaching Methods and Sports Administration and Organization. His research interests focus around sports psychology and football. He has published several scholarly articles and participated national academic panels and conferences. Recently he lectured on the Theory of Sports Psychology at the National Seminars for Basketball Coach Candidates that was organized by the Turkish Basketball Federation in Rize, Turkey, held between 22 April and 3 May 2008

- (Ph.D.) School of Health Sciences, Gazi University (2007)

The Expectations and Attitudes of Parents towards Their Children's Participation in the Physical Education Classes

- (M. S.) School of Physical Education and Sports, Karadeniz Technical University (2002)

A Research on the Factors Affecting the Variation of Aggressive Behaviors During the Games of the Turkish Super League Football Players in 2001-02 Season

- (B. S.) School of Physical Education and Sports, Karadeniz Technical University (1999)

== Published works ==
=== Articles in Accredited Journals ===
- Öncü E., Güven Ö.The Family Factor in Physical Education and Sports Participation (Journal of Family and Society Quarterly, July 2006, pp. 81–90)
- Öncü E., Güven Ö.Physical Education, Sports and Family (Journal of Turkish Motherland by Turkish Historical Society, January 2007, pp. 48–56)

=== Conference Papers in International Conferences ===
- Öncü E., Güven Ö. Validity and Reliability of Attitude Scales on Oil Wrestling (Yağlı Güreş) (9th International Sports Sciences Congress, Mugla, Turkey, November 2006)
- Öncü E., Cihan H. A Research on the Validity and the Reliability of the Attitudes of K-12 Teacher School Students towards Physical Education (4th International Mediterranean Sports Sciences Congress, Antalya, Turkey, November 2007)
- Öncü E., Güven Ö. A Study on the Validity and the Reliability of Non-Ethical Behaviors Scale Applied on Soccer Coaches (4th International Mediterranean Sports Sciences Congress, Antalya, Turkey, November 2007)
- Öncü E., Gürbüz B., Tunçkol H. M. Basketball Attitude Scale: A Study on Formulation, Validity and Reliability (4th International Mediterranean Sports Sciences Congress, Antalya, Turkey, November 2007)
- Öncü E., Güven Ö. A Study on the Validity and the Reliability of Football Attitude Scales (Fenerbahçe Spor Kulübü Centennial International Sports and Science Congress, November–December 2007, Istanbul, Turkey)
