= Elizaveta Dorfman =

Russian painter (1899–1942)

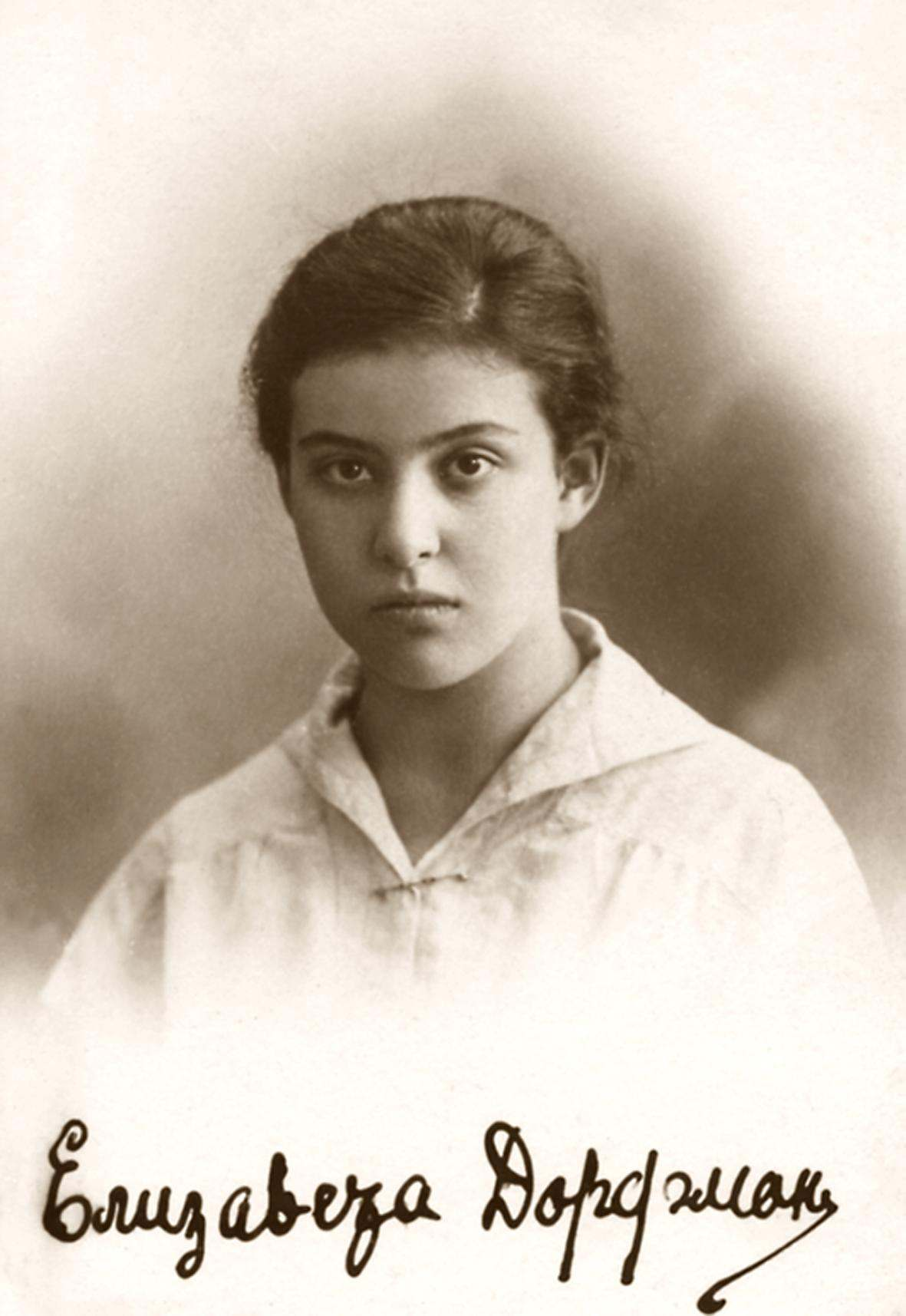
- Occupation: Artist

Elizaveta Grigoryevna Dorfman, (ru: Елизавета Григорьевна Дорфман) or Gerševna (c.1899 – c.1942) was a Jewish Russian artist possibly from Saint Petersburg.

== Life ==
Most sources give Dorfman's birth year as 1899, but her World War II refugee registration card gives her birth year as 1898.

She provided a cover illustration for Sounding Shell (1921 or 1922), a collection of poetry by the circle surrounding Nikolai Gumilev. She also designed a poster for the 1922 film Blood and Sand.

In the late 1930s, Dorfman was living in Sochi. World War II forced her into exile as a Jewish refugee in Tashkent, Uzbekistan. She died there, in 1941 or 1942 during the Blockade of Leningrad.

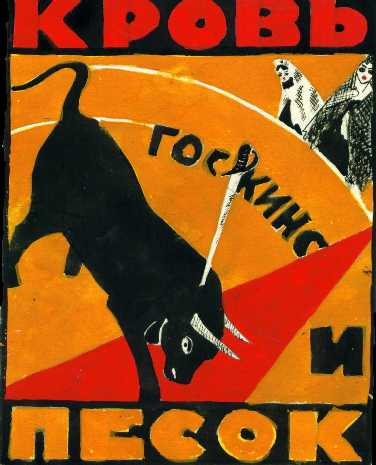
1922 film poster for Blood and Sand
