= Elizaveta Lastochkina =

Russian teacher of the deaf (1869–1967)

Elizaveta Guryevna Lastochkina (Russian: Елизавета Гурьевна Ласточкина; 5 June 1869 – 1 January 1967) was a Russian teacher of the deaf. Hero of Labor (1936), Honored School Teacher of the RSFSR (1944).

== Early life and education ==
Lastochkina was born in Shusha in the family of a state councilor. In 1887, she graduated from the Kazan Mariinsky Women's Gymnasium pedagogical class with a gold medal.

== Career ==
In 1889, Lastochkina became a teacher at the Kazan School for the Deaf and Mute. In 1894, she was appointed head of the Kazan School for the Deaf and Mute.

Since 1931, Lastochkina has been in charge of the educational department of the Kazan School for the Deaf and Mute. She is the organizer of the Kazan Society of the Deaf and Mute. Since 1954 Lastochkina has been working in the Kazan School for the Deaf as a methodologist-consultant.

Elizaveta Lastochkina died in Moscow in 1967 and was cremated. In 1967, an urn with her ashes was buried in the grave of her grandfather, Archpriest Guriy Lastochkin, at the Arskoe Cemetery in Kazan to the right of the altar of the Yaroslavl Wonderworkers Church.

== Contribution to the development of deaf education ==
Lastochkina reformed the activities of the Kazan School for the Deaf and Mute. She drew up curricula and introduced teaching crafts and drawing. Lastochkina developed the oral method of teaching the deaf. Thanks to her, pupils began to communicate verbally with others. Lastochkina was involved in developing approaches to the upbringing and education of deaf children.

In 1903, Lastochkina spoke at the Second Meeting of Deaf Teachers, held as part of the Congress of Figures on Technical and Vocational Education. She made a report, On facial expressions, in which she expressed thoughts that went against the tendencies of the leaders of the congress who sought to expel facial expressions from the process of teaching the Russian language and general subjects.

Lastochkina considered facial expressions a means of communication, thanks to which deaf and mute children were not alone in a team. At the same time, she admitted that deaf and mute will have full-fledged communication with their peers only when they master oral speech. In her school, Lastochkina allowed gestures and facial expressions in her work, along with teaching oral speech, which she used in classes with students during extracurricular time as an auxiliary tool.

In 1910, Lastochkina made a report at the All-Russian Congress of Figures for the Education, Education, and Charity of the Deaf and Mute on the topic Incapacitated deaf and mute people and their education. In the report, she insisted on compulsory education and preparation for independent living. She noted the need to apply an individual approach to such children.

After the 1917 revolution, Lastochkina was actively involved in building a new education system. New workshops were opened in the Kazan School for the Deaf and Mute, teaching of drawing and physical education was introduced, and a hearing room and classes for deaf children equipped with special equipment were organized.

Since 1931, Lastochkina has been in charge of the educational department of the Kazan School for the Deaf and Mute.

The activity of Lastochkina in the education and upbringing of the deaf from 1889 to 1965 is a significant contribution to the theory and practice of deaf education in the Soviet Union.

== Commemoration ==
Seventy-six of her 98 years, Lastochkina dedicated to teaching at the School for the Deaf she established in Kazan, which was affectionately called the Lastochkina's Nest (Swallow's Nest). Lastochkina ran the school during the years of the revolution and two world wars. Today, the school named after Lastochkina is in a modern building with the necessary educational and methodological production complex. In memory of the founder, a monument to Lastochkina was erected in the school courtyard.

== Awards and honors ==
- Hero of Labor (1936).
- Cavalier of two Orders of Lenin and the Order of the Red Banner of Labour.
- Honored School Teacher of the RSFSR (1944).
