= Elizaveta Yankova =

Elizaveta Petrovna Yankova
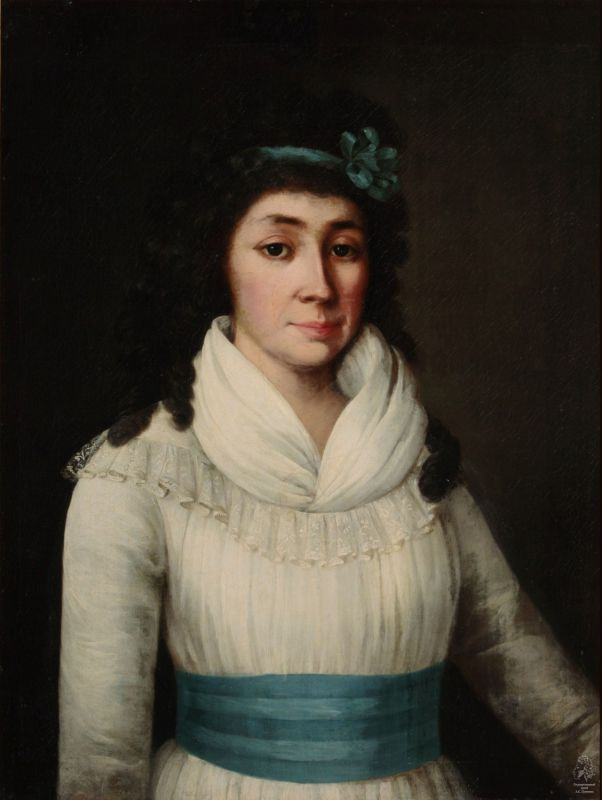
- Elizaveta Yankova, 1794
- Born: April 4, 1768
- Died: March 15, 1861 (aged 92)
- Occupation: Writer

Elizaveta Petrovna Yankova (née Rimskaya–Korsakova; April 4, 1768 – March 15, 1861) was a Moskva old–timer who left detailed memoirs about the life of noble Moskva "for five generations", recorded and published by her grandson Dmitriy Blagovo.

== Biography ==
The third daughter of the Captain of the Semyonovskoe Regiment Pyotr Rimskiy–Korsakov (December 8, 1731 – 1807) from his marriage to Princess Pelageya Shcherbatova (1743 – June 24, 1783). On her father's side, she was the great–granddaughter of the historian Vasiliy Tatishchev. She spent her childhood and youth on her father's Estate Bobrovo ("Kaluga was seventeen miles away") and in her parents' Moskva Home near Ostozhenka, and after her mother's death in 1783, on the Estate Pokrovskoe in Tula Guberniya.

Elizaveta Petrovna married a distant relative, Dmitriy Yankov (1761–1816), on June 5, 1793, in Moskva. He had proposed to her three times and had been rejected three times by her strict father. The wedding took place in the One–Day Church of Iliya. After the wedding, the newlyweds went to Yankov's Estate Gorki near Moskva; then they settled in Yankov's House, which was located on Neopalimovskiy Lane on the site of today's Estate No. 5.

In 1806, the couple bought a house from the Bibikovs on the corner of Prechistenka and Myortvy Lane – old and dilapidated. Five years later they built a new house, which they moved into in November 1811. On September 1, 1812, as Napoleon's Army approached Moskva, Elizaveta Yankova and her children left for her Tambov Estate, Elizavetino, to return to the house that had burned down in 1815.

The new house was built by 1818, when Yankova was already a widow. In 1828 she sold the house: "I was very tired of the busy place on Prechistenka from the constant driving". From 1828 to 1838, she lived in a house on Shtatny Lane, on the site of which Aleksandra Derozhinskaya's Mansion was later built. For a long time she lived with her unmarried daughter Kleopatra, after whose death she moved into the House of the Blagovo Family.

Elizaveta Yankova "vividly remembered all the family traditions dating back to the time of Pyotr I, and told them with amazing detail, sometimes remembering years and dates: who was married to whom, who had how many children, in a word, she was a living chronicle of the entire 18th century and half of the 19th". Her grandson, Dmitriy Blagovo (Pimen in monasticism), immortalized his grandmother by publishing her memoirs in the magazine "Russian Herald" (1878–1880). The book was published as a separate edition under the title "Grandmother's Stories" in 1885, published by Aleksey Suvorin.

== Children ==
She had seven children in her marriage, most of whom died in childhood.

- Agrafena Dmitrievna (May 31, 1794 – 1865), an amateur artist, married to Dmitriy Blagovo (1783–1827) from 1825; they had a son, Dmitriy;
- Pyotr Dmitrievich (1795 – February 23, 1797);
- Anna Dmitrievna (November 22, 1796 – ?), married to Colonel Nikolay Posnikov since 1823;
- Sofya Dmitrievna (April 29, 1798 – December 7, 1805);
- Kleopatra Dmitrievna (1800–1847);
- Elizaveta Dmitrievna (April 18, 1802 – February 5, 1803);
- Aleksandr Dmitrievich (1803 – January 1, 1805);
- Sofya Dmitrievna (August 28, 1807 – 1820).

== Sources ==
- Grandmother's Stories. From the Memories of Five Generations, Recorded and Collected by Her Grandson Dmitriy Blagovo – Sankt–Peterburg: Aleksey Suvorin Printing House, 1885 – [2], 462, 31 Pages, 1 Portrait Sheet (Stories... / The Edition Was Prepared by Tamara Ornatskaya – Leningrad: Nauka, 1989 – 472 Pages, Illustrations, 1 Portrait Sheet – Literary Monuments)
- Aleksandr Nikiforov (2014). "House of "Grandmother" Yankova". Moskva Magazine (8): 50–57. ISSN 0868-7110.
