= Marli Ehrman =

German-American textile designer

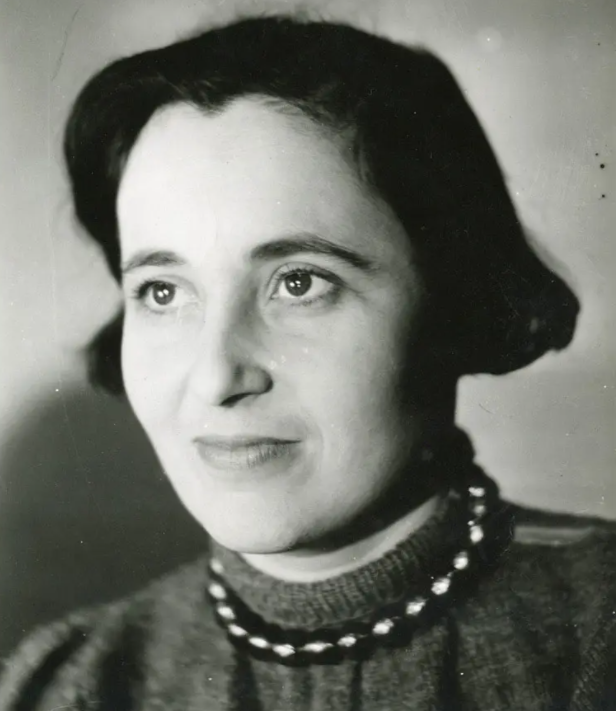
Marli Ehrman

Marli Ehrman née Marie Helene Heimann (1904–1982) was a German-American textile artist, designer and educator. She studied weaving at the Bauhaus, graduating in 1927. While working as a handicrafts teacher at a Berlin school for Jewish children, she married the history teacher Eliezer Ehrman. After the couple emigrated to the United States she taught weaving at the School of Design in Chicago, gaining recognition when she won first prize for her furniture fabrics from New York's Museum of Modern Art (MoMA). She went on to create weaving designs for industry and managed interior design work on a variety of buildings including the Oak Park Public Library.

== Early life and education ==
Born on 17 December 1904 in Berlin, Marie Helene (Marli) Heimann was the daughter of Hans Heimann (1864–1942) and his wife Dora Lucie née Fliess (1880–1942). Brought up in a Jewish family, she was the younger sister of the art historian Adelheid (Heidi) Heimann (1903–93). After attending the Westend-Schule (1912–21), she studied at the Bauhaus in Weimar, specializing in textile art at the weaving workshop in Dessau under Gunta Stölzl and graduating in 1927. She went on to study at the University of Jena and obtained a teaching diploma in Hamburg.

== Career ==
After employment in the experimental department of the Bauhaus weaving workshop (1932–33), she taught at the state education centre in Selent and at the Herzl School in Berlin. While back in Berlin, she met and married the Jewish history scholar. Intent on escaping from the Nazi regime, the couple emigrated to the United States in 1938. The following year, she was invited by fellow Bauhaus immigrant László Moholy-Nagy to join him as director of the Textile Design Workshop at the School of Design in Chicago.

In addition to teaching weaving and textile art, Ehrman participated in MoMA's contest for Organic Design in Home Furnishings, winning the first prize in 1941. From 1947, she accepted commissions to design and organize the production of fabrics for industry from firms such as Herman Miller Furniture and the Dow Chemical Company. She planned the interior design of residential, commercial and public buildings including the Oak Park Public Library in 1962.

Her involvement with the School of Design terminated with the death of Moholy-Nagy in 1947 but in 1956, she became an associate member of the group set up by her students known at The Marli Weavers. One of her most prominent clients was Mies van der Rohe who commissioned her to design a curtain fabric for his apartment buildings on Lake Shore Drive in Chicago.

== Later years ==
On retiring in 1971, Marli Ehrman and her husband moved to Santa Barbara, California, where she died on December 17, 1982. Many of her creations can be seen in New York's Museum of Modern Art.
