= Elizaveta Koteneva =

Russian rhythmic gymnast (born 2004)

- Born: January 9, 2004 (age 22) Belgorod, Russia

Gymnastics career
- Discipline: Rhythmic gymnastics
- Country represented: Russia (2019-)
- Club: FSOP Rossiya
- Head coaches: Kristina Timonova, Galina Oglezneva
Medal record
International gymnastics competitions
Event	1st	2nd	3rd
Junior World Championships	4	0	0
Junior European Championships	4	0	0
Total	8	0	0
Rhythmic Gymnastics
Representing Russia
Junior World Championships
Gold medal – first place	2019 Moscow	Team
Gold medal – first place	2019 Moscow	Group All-Around
Gold medal – first place	2019 Moscow	5 Hoops
Gold medal – first place	2019 Moscow	5 Ribbons
Junior European Championships
Gold medal – first place	2019 Baku	Team
Gold medal – first place	2019 Baku	Group All-Around
Gold medal – first place	2019 Baku	5 Hoops
Gold medal – first place	2019 Baku	5 Ribbons

Elizaveta Koteneva (Russian: Елизавета Котенева, born January 9, 2004, in Belgorod, Russia) is a Russian group rhythmic gymnast. She is the 2019 World Junior Group All-Around, Team, 5 Hoops and 5 Ribbons champion and the 2019 European Junior Group All-Around, Team, 5 Hoops and 5 Ribbons champion.

== Career ==
=== Junior ===
Elizaveta was born in Belgorod on January 9, 2004. She began training in rhythmic gymnastics at age 5. In 2017, she was invited to train with junior national team in Moscow. She was a member of Russian Group that competed at the 2019 World Junior Championships in Moscow, Russia taking the gold medal scoring a total of (49.550) ahead of Italy (45.100) and Belarus (43.100) in the all-around competition. They also won gold medals in team competition and in both apparatus finals.
