= Elizaveta Rutkovskaja =

Estonian footballer

Personal information
- Date of birth: 9 December 1997 (age 28)
- Place of birth: Tartu, Estonia
- Position: Midfielder

Team information
- Current team: Pärnu JK Vaprus
- Number: 75

Youth career
- Pärnu

Senior career*
Years	Team	Apps	(Gls)
2014-2019	Pärnu	60	(11)
2021-	Pärnu JK Vaprus		

International career^{‡}
2017–	Estonia	9	(0)
- * Club domestic league appearances and goals ‡ National team caps and goals as of 20:55, 30 March 2020 (UTC)

Elizaveta Rutkovskaja (born 9 December 1997) is an Estonian footballer who plays as a midfielder and has appeared for the Estonia women's national team.

Rutkovskaja has been capped for the Estonia national team, appearing for the team during the 2019 FIFA Women's World Cup qualifying cycle.
