= Elizaveta Naydenova =

Yelizaveta Ivanovna Naydenova
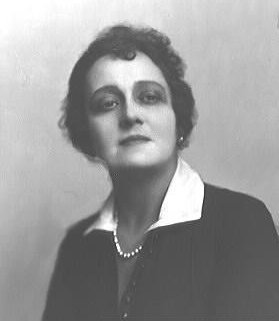
- Born: 1876; Russian Empire
- Died: 1951 (aged 74–75)
- Education: Chernyaev Women's School
- Occupation: Actress
- Awards: two Orders of the Badge of Honor (09/23/1937; 10/26/1949) Honored Artist of the RSFSR (1937)

Elizaveta Ivanovna Naydenova (1876–1951) - Russian theatre and film actress, Honored Artist of the RSFSR (1937).

== Biography ==
Born in a family of merchants Reshetnikovs. In 1896 she played her first role in an amateur play. She graduated from the Chernyaev Women's School on the Maiden's Field, where she received the title of a home teacher.

In 1902, she played on the stage of the Hunt Club under the pseudonym Tomskaya (Fenya in Shpazhinsky's Mayorsha). In 1905-1907 studied at the drama courses at the Maly Theater. In 1907 she played her first professional role at the Maly Theatre, where she worked until 1942, playing mainly roles in Ostrovsky's plays. In 1934-1936 she worked in the Penza region in the Zemetchinsky branch of the Maly Theater.

During the war, she played on the stage of the front-line drama theatre of the Navy.

She was buried at the Novodevichy Cemetery (2 ch. 31 row).

== Roles in the theatre ==
- "Mayorsha" Shpazhinsky – Fenya
- "Without a Dowry" - Larisa Ogudalova, Kruchinina
- "Talents and Admirers" – Negina
- "Thunderstorm" – Katerina
- "In a busy place" – Annushka
- "The truth is good, but happiness is better" – Polyxena
- "The Poor Bride" - Marya Andreevna
- "Yegor Bulychev and others" - Ksenia Bulycheva
- "Inspector" - Anna Andreevna
- "Poverty is not a vice" - Pelageya Yegorovna

== Filmography ==
- 1916 Sisters Kedrov
- 1918 Swamp mirages - Yelena Alekseevna, mother of Rakitin
- 1918 Maiden Mountains - warrior maiden
- 1927 Victory of a woman - his wife
- 1940 Hero's brother - Yevdokia Vlasyevna, teacher

== Awards ==
- two Orders of the Badge of Honor (09/23/1937; 10/26/1949)
- Honored Artist of the RSFSR (1937)
