= Elizaveta Alexandrova-Zorina =

Russian-born writer (born 1984)

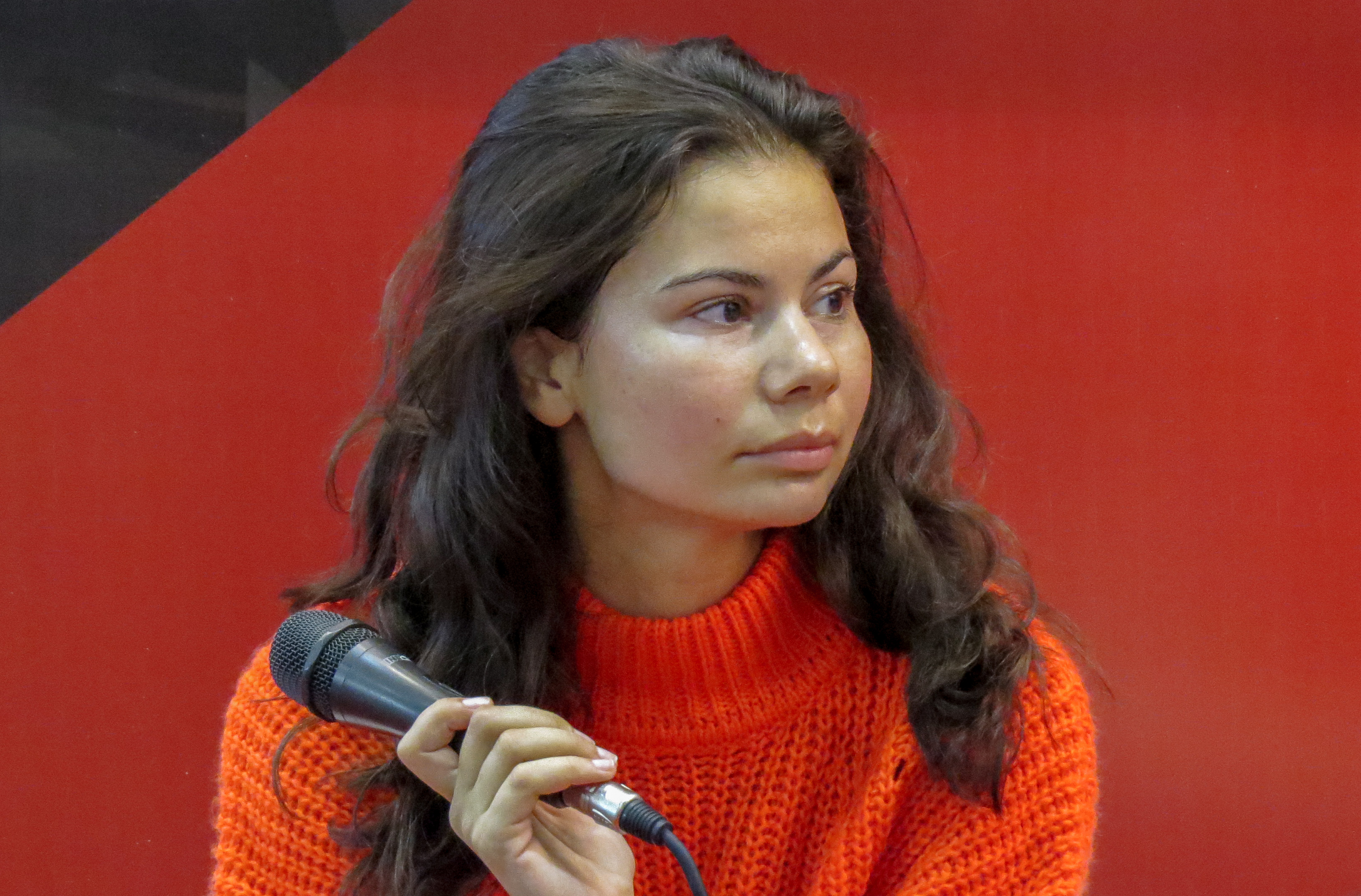
- Born: March 22, 1984
- Occupations: Opinion writer, prosaist, writer

Elizaveta Borisovna Alexandrova-Zorina (Russian: Елизавета Борисовна Александрова-Зорина; born 22 March 1984) is a Russian author and columnist. She is also a publicist and blogger. She was a columnist for Radio Free Europe/Radio Liberty and Moskovskij Komsomolets and authored six books published by Eksmo. She is a Zvezda magazine award winner (2019).

== Personal life ==
Alexandrova was born in Leningrad and grew up in Kovdor. She studied at the High Courses for Scriptwriters and Film Directors. She is an atheist and radical leftist.

== Bibliography ==
=== Novels ===
- Маленький человек (Eksmo, 2012). The Little Man, trans. Melanie Moore (Glas New Russian Writing, 2013)
- Человек без лица (Eksmo, 2016)
- Сломанная кукла (Eksmo, 2016)
- Треть жизни мы спим (Eksmo, 2018)
- Развилка (2018)
- Рюссен коммер! (Eksmo, 2021)

=== Short-story collections ===
- Бунтовщица (2011)
- Три семерки (Eksmo, 2016)

=== Non-fiction ===
- Сергей Есенин. Подлинные воспоминания современников (2017)
- Imperiets barn : ett reportage (Volante, 2023)
