= Thierry Ehrmann =

French businessman

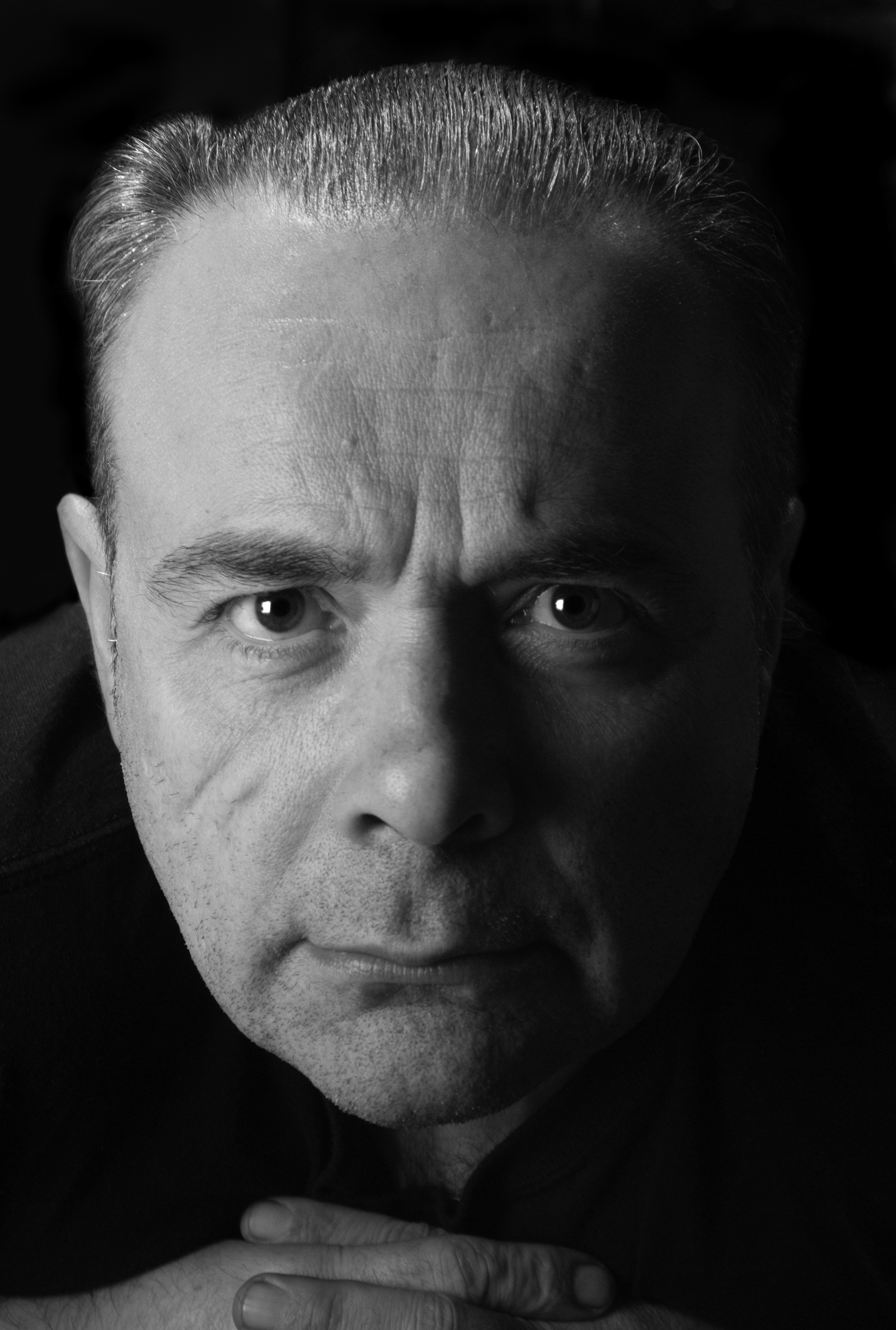
Thierry Ehrmann

Thierry Ehrmann (born 1962) is the founder and current chairman of the Serveur Group. He was born in Avignon. He works from his house which has been transformed into the artwork Abode of Chaos. He's on the far left of the political French spectrum. He is a freemason, and had founded his own lodge (Faits et Documents, n° 117, 2001, p. 1-2, 6).

== Serveur Group & Artprice.com ==
The Serveur Group manages art auction quotation databases. The information is administered from Artprice.com, which serves as both the legal and auction interface for the group.

Artprice.com compiles and regularly updates art reference databases containing information on auction prices, artist biographies, and artwork images sourced from a library of 290,000 auction catalogues. However, Artprice has faced criticism for its alleged use of spam marketing campaigns.
