= Kvemo Ermani =

Coordinates: 42°30′47″N 44°14′12″E

Kvemo Ermani or Kvemo Yermani (Georgian: ქვემო ერმანი; Ossetian: Дæллаг Ерман) is a village in the Java District of South Ossetia or Shida Kartli, Georgia, at an altitude of 1,940 m. Distance to the municipality center, Java, is 46 km. As of 2015, the settlement was home to 21 people.
