= Elisabeth Boehm =

Russian artist (1843–1914)

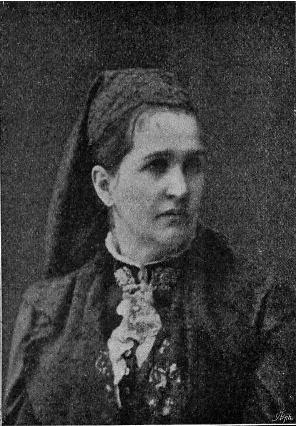
Elisabeth Boehm, 1901

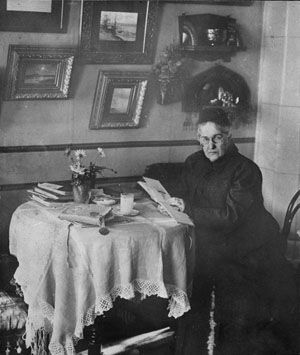
Elisabeth Boehm

Elisabeth Boehm or Böhm (née Endaurova, Russian: Елизавета Меркурьевна Бём, romanized: Yelizaveta Merkuryevna Byom; 1843–1914) was a Russian painter, a popular designer of postcards.

== Biography ==
She was born in Saint Petersburg to a noble Russian family of Endaurov (Эндауров) of Tatar origin. She spent her childhood in the estate of her parents, in the village of Schiptsy, Poshekhonsky, Yaroslavl Governorate. At the age of 14 she entered the School of Painting at the Society for Promotion of Artists (Школа Поощрения Художеств) where she studied under Ivan Kramskoi and Pavel Chistyakov. In 1865 she graduated from the school with the Large Silver Medal. She took private lessons from Kramskoi and studied at the Imperial Academy of Arts where she was awarded a Large Encouragement Medal for her animal paintings.

She married a prominent Russian-Hungarian violinist Ludwig Boehm, professor of the Saint Petersburg Conservatory. Elisabeth painted many watercolors, illustrated children books of the Folk Library (Народная библиотека) series there she was introduced by Leo Tolstoy. She also experimented with glass and ceramics. For her silhouettes, etchings, and works of glass she received medals of the World Fairs in Chicago of 1893, Paris of 1900, Munich of 1902 and Milan of 1906 (gold medal).

Still she is mostly known as one of the most prominent Russian authors of postcards. She created more than 350 postcards, most of which printed by the St. Eugenia Welfare Society (Благотоворительное Общество Святой Евгении). She created a recognisable style of postcards, which depict children's faces and silhouettes. According to the study of Tretyakov and Gutterman, she was the most reprinted author of postcards in the Russian empire.

Elisabeth Böhm died in 1914.

== Selected postcards ==
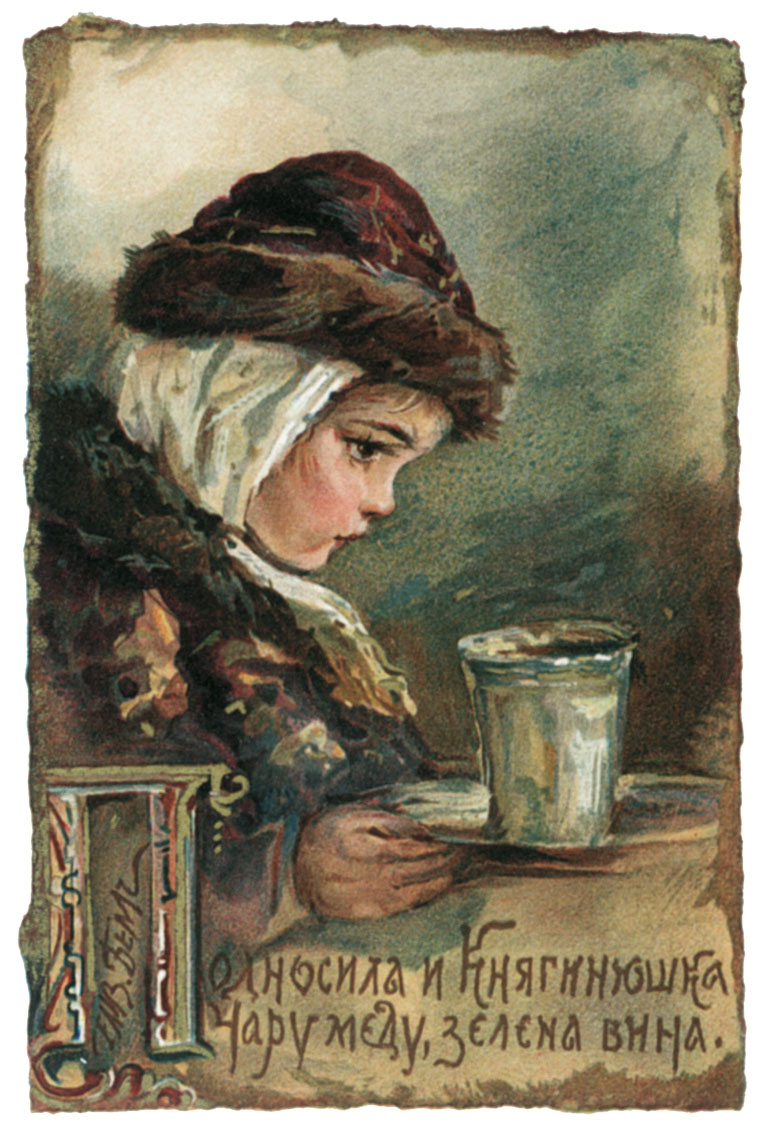
The princess brought mead

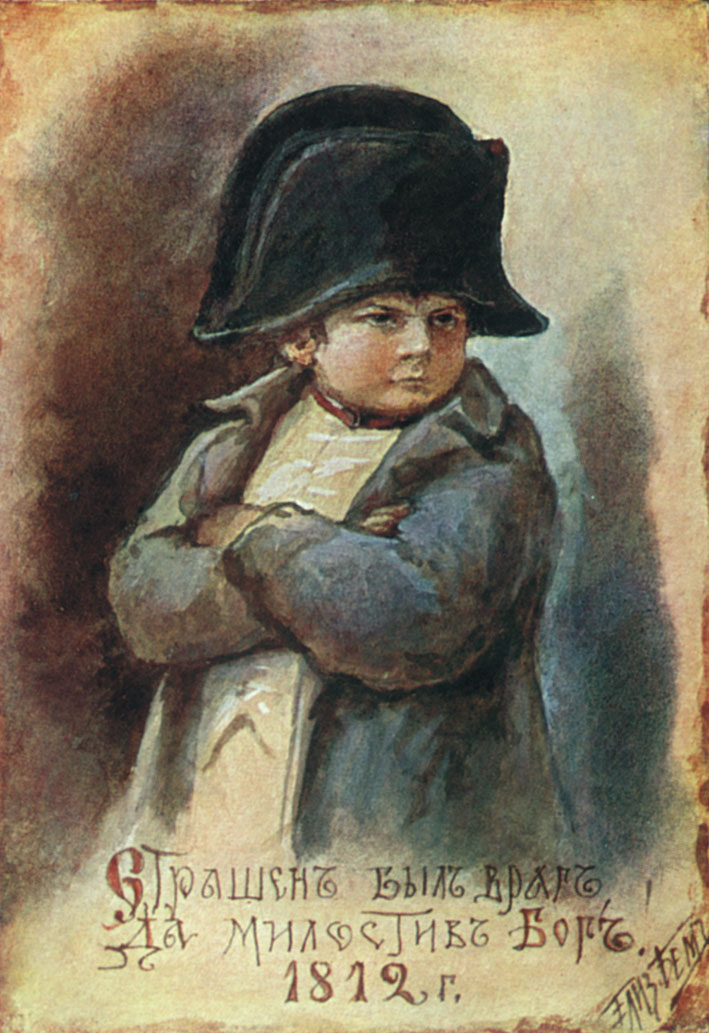
The Enemy was terrible but
God is merciful

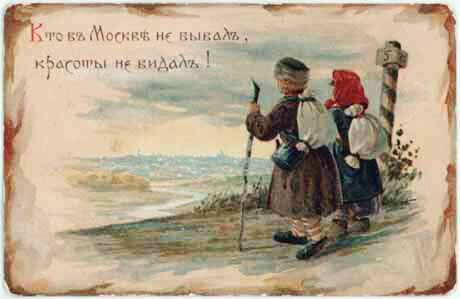
One who has not been to Moscow has not seen beauty

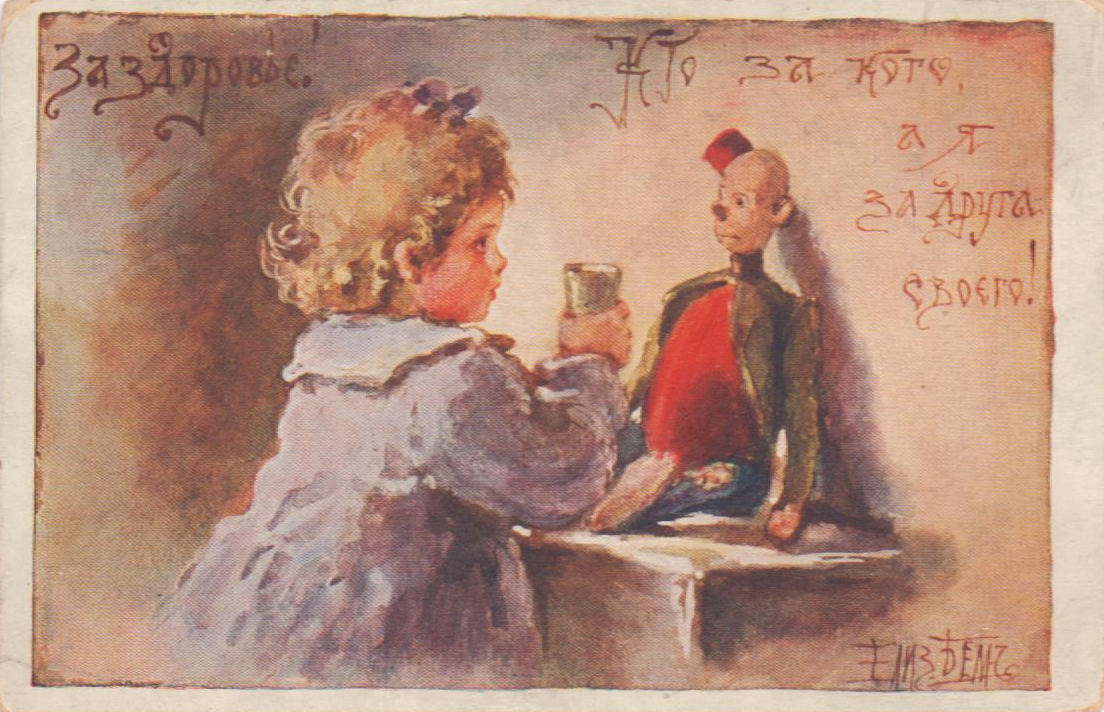
People stand for different things but I stand for my friend
