= Pu Yanzhu =

Chinese rhythmic gymnast

- Born: 18 April 2005 (age 21) Sichuan, China

Gymnastics career
- Discipline: Rhythmic gymnastics
- Country represented: China; (2022-)
- Club: Sichuan Province
- Head coach: Sun Dan
Medal record
Rhythmic Gymnastics
Representing China
Event	1st	2nd	3rd
World Championships	2	3	2
Asian Championships	5	1	2
FIG World Cup	11	6	5
Total	18	10	9
World Championships
Gold medal – first place	2023 Valencia	5 Hoops
Gold medal – first place	2025 Rio de Janeiro	5 Ribbons
Silver medal – second place	2023 Valencia	Group All-around
Silver medal – second place	2023 Valencia	3 Ribbons + 2 Balls
Silver medal – second place	2026 Frankfurt	5 Balls
Bronze medal – third place	2025 Rio de Janeiro	3 Balls + 2 Hoops
Bronze medal – third place	2026 Frankfurt	Team
Asian Games
Gold medal – first place	2026 Aichi-Nagoya	Group All-around
Asian Championships
Gold medal – first place	2023 Manila	Group All-Around
Gold medal – first place	2023 Manila	5 Hoops
Gold medal – first place	2023 Manila	3 Ribbons + 2 Balls
Gold medal – first place	2026 Bishkek	5 Balls
Gold medal – first place	2026 Bishkek	3 Hoops + 4 Clubs
Silver medal – second place	2026 Bishkek	Group All-Around
Bronze medal – third place	2023 Manila	Team
Bronze medal – third place	2026 Bishkek	Team

Pu Yanzhu (born 18 April 2005) is a Chinese rhythmic gymnast. She is the 2023 World group all-around silver medalist.

== Personal life ==
She began the sport in 2019 because her father had received professional training in sport and wanted her to become a professional athlete. Her dream is to compete at the 2024 Olympic Games in Paris. She's studying at the Chengdu Sport University.

== Career ==
She was incorporated into the national team in 2022, debuting with a bronze in the All-Around and silver with 5 hoops at the World Cup in Pesaro. In September she was selected along Guo Qiqi, Hao Ting, Huang Zhangjiayang, Wang Lanjing and individuals Yue Zhao and Zhao Yating for the World Championships in Sofia, Bulgaria, ending on 12th place in teams, 7th in the group all-Around and with 5 hoops and 4th with 3 ribbons & 2 balls.

At the 2023 World Cup in Tashkent the group won gold in the all-Around and both even finals. Weeks later she won gold in the All-Around and silver in the two event finals in Baku. From May 31 to June 3 the group competed at the Asian Championships in Manila, winning bronze in teams along individuals Wang Zilu, Zhao Yating and Zhao Yue, gold in the All-Around, with 5 hoops and with 3 ribbons & 2 balls. In July she travelled to Milan for the last World Cup of the season, getting bronze in the All-Around and with 3 ribbons & 2 balls. in late August Yanzhu was selected for the World Championships in Valencia, winning silver in the All-Around and with 3 ribbons & 2 balls as well an historical gold medal with 5 hoops.

In 2025, Pu debuted with a renewed group (consisting of herself, Wang Lanjing, Liu Miaoting, Ding Xinyi and Zhang Xinyi) at the World Cup in Baku, winning silver medal in all-around and mixed apparatus and gold in 5 ribbons. On April 25–27, they won bronze medal in all-around at Tashkent World Cup. They also won gold in 5 ribbons and silver in 3 balls + 2 hoops finals. On July 18–20, they won bronze in all-around and gold in 3 balls + 2 hoops at Milan World Cup. In late August, she was selected to represent China alongside Liu Miaoting, Ding Xinyi, Wang Lanjing, Zhang Xinyi and Zhao Wanzhu at the 2025 World Championships in Rio de Janeiro, Brazil, where they took 4th place in group all-around. They won gold medal in 5 ribbons and bronze in 3 balls + 2 hoops final.

In 2026, Yanzhu and her teammates (Liu Miaoting, Zhao Wanzhu, Zhang Xinyi, Ding Xinyi, Wang Lanjing) started competition season in late March at Sofia World Cup. They took 4th place in all-around and won gold in 5 Balls final. On April 10-12, they won gold medal in all-around at Tashkent World Cup. They also won gold medals in both apparatus finals. They won gold medal in 5 balls and silver in 3 hoops + 4 clubs final at Baku World Cup. In June, they won gold medals in all-around and both apparatus finals at Beijing World Challenge Cup. In July, they won gold medal in 3 hoops + 4 clubs final and finished 4th in 5 balls final at Milan World Cup. In August, she was selected to represent China alongside Liu Miaoting, Ding Xinyi, Wang Lanjing, Zhang Xinyi, Wanzhu Zhao at the 2026 World Championships in Frankfurt, Germany. They took 7th place in group all-around, due to mistakes in 3 hoops + 4 clubs routine. They won silver medal in 5 balls final and a historic bronze medal in team competition alongside Wang Zilu and Wang Qi.
