= Liu Miaoting =

Chinese rhythmic gymnast (born 2005)

- Born: 27 August 2005 (age 21) Zhejiang, China

Gymnastics career
- Discipline: Rhythmic gymnastics
- Country represented: China; (2025-)
- Head coach: Sun Dan
- Assistant coach: Anastasia Bliznyuk
Medal record
Rhythmic Gymnastics
Representing China
Event	1st	2nd	3rd
World Championships	1	1	2
FIG World Cup	7	3	2
Total	8	4	4
World Championships
Gold medal – first place	2025 Rio de Janeiro	5 Ribbons
Silver medal – second place	2026 Frankfurt	5 Balls
Bronze medal – third place	2025 Rio de Janeiro	3 Balls + 2 Hoops
Bronze medal – third place	2026 Frankfurt	Team
Asian Games
Gold medal – first place	2026 Aichi-Nagoya	Group All-around
Asian Championships
Gold medal – first place	2026 Bishkek	5 Balls
Gold medal – first place	2026 Bishkek	3 Hoops + 4 Clubs
Silver medal – second place	2026 Bishkek	Group All-Around
Bronze medal – third place	2026 Bishkek	Team

Liu Miaoting (Chinese: 刘妙婷; born 27 August 2005) is a Chinese rhythmic gymnast.

== Career ==
Mioating turned senior in 2021. Later that year, she represented Shanghai at the 14th National Games of China in Shaanxi, China, where the Shanghai rhythmic gymnastics group placed fourth in the group all-around final.

Liu was a captain of reserve senior group until 2025, when she integrated in the main senior group (consisting of herself, Wang Lanjing, Ding Xinyi, Pu Yanzhu and Zhang Xinyi) at the World Cup in Baku, winning silver medal in all-around and mixed apparatus and gold in 5 ribbons. On April 25–27, they won bronze medal in all-around at Tashkent World Cup. They also won gold in 5 ribbons and silver in 3 balls + 2 hoops finals. On July 18–20, they won bronze in all-around and gold in 3 balls + 2 hoops at Milan World Cup. In late August, she was selected to represent China alongside Ding Xinyi, Pu Yanzhu, Wang Lanjing, Zhang Xinyi and Zhao Wanzhu at the 2025 World Championships in Rio de Janeiro, Brazil, where they took 4th place in group all-around. They won gold medal in 5 ribbons and bronze in 3 balls + 2 hoops final.

In 2026, Miaoting and her teammates (Pu Yanzhu, Zhao Wanzhu, Zhang Xinyi, Ding Xinyi, Wang Lanjing) started competition season in late March at Sofia World Cup. They took 4th place in all-around and won gold in 5 Balls final. On April 10-12, they won gold medal in all-around at Tashkent World Cup. They also won gold medals in both apparatus finals. They won gold medal in 5 balls and silver in 3 hoops + 4 clubs final at Baku World Cup. In June, they won gold medals in all-around and both apparatus finals at Beijing World Challenge Cup. In July, they won gold medal in 3 hoops + 4 clubs final and finished 4th in 5 balls final at Milan World Cup. In August, she was selected to represent China alongside Ding Xinyi, Pu Yanzhu, Wang Lanjing, Zhang Xinyi, Wanzhu Zhao at the 2026 World Championships in Frankfurt, Germany. They took 7th place in group all-around, due to mistakes in 3 hoops + 4 clubs routine. They won silver medal in 5 balls final and a historic bronze medal in team competition alongside Wang Zilu and Wang Qi.
