= Gymnastics at the 2026 Asian Games – Women's rhythmic individual all-around =

Women's rhythmic individual all-around at the 2026 Asian Games
- Venue: Nippon Gaishi Hall Rainbow Hall
- Date: 01 October 2026 (qualification); 03 October 2026 (final)

Medalists
gold medal	Takhmina Ikromova	Uzbekistan
silver medal	Wang Qi	China
bronze medal	Wang Zilu	China

The women's rhythmic individual all-around competition at the 2026 Asian Games took place from 1 to 3 October 2026 at Nippon Gaishi Hall Rainbow Hall in Nagoya, Japan.

== Schedule ==
All times are Japan Standard Time (UTC+09:00)

Date	Time	Event
Thursday, 1 October 2026	10:00	Qualification
Saturday, 3 October 2026	13:00	Final

== Results ==
=== Qualification ===
Rank	Athlete	Hoop (rhythmic gymnastics)	Ball (rhythmic gymnastics)	Clubs (rhythmic gymnastics)	Ribbon (rhythmic gymnastics)	Total
1	Akmaral Yerekesheva (KAZ)	28.600	27.300	27.750	27.700	111.350
2	Wang Qi (CHN)	27.600	26.500	28.650	26.400	109.150
3	Takhmina Ikromova (UZB)	25.500	28.350	26.400	26.700	106.950
4	Aibota Yertaikyzy (KAZ)	27.650	26.550	24.850	27.500	106.550
5	Seo Eun-chae (KOR)	27.550	24.100	27.450	25.600	104.700
6	Zlata Arkatova (KGZ)	27.100	25.400	24.000	27.950	104.450
7	Wang Zilu (CHN)	25.750	27.300	26.250	25.100	104.400
8	Mirano Kita (JPN)	27.700	24.550	23.200	26.650	102.100
9	Ha Su-yi (KOR)	26.200	24.150	26.650	24.100	101.100
10	Breanna Labadan (PHI)	25.850	25.300	25.750	21.100	98.000
11	Lola Djuraeva (UZB)	23.900	24.950	24.450	24.400	97.700
12	Mikayla Angeline Yang (SGP)	25.550	22.400	25.900	23.700	97.550
13	Jasmine Althea Ramilo (PHI)	24.850	24.150	24.100	24.350	97.450
14	Naruha Suzuki (JPN)	24.500	24.400	23.200	23.250	95.450
15	Asel Arapova (KGZ)	22.300	20.600	25.200	21.850	89.950
16	Pebbyl Jing Ya Ang (SGP)	22.250	21.100	22.650	21.850	87.850
17	Sitanan Eakbunnasing (THA)	22.150	20.200	21.600	21.950	85.900
18	Sikharee Sutthiragsa (THA)	22.250	18.600	20.800	20.800	82.450
19	Praewa Misato Philaphandeth (LAO)	22.300	18.500	20.200	19.950	81.000
20	Tri Wahyuni (INA)	21.000	17.900	20.950	20.750	80.600
21	Ting Huen Li (HKG)	20.450	20.850	19.950	16.900	78.150
22	Alisa Daud (SYR)	18.300	16.700	18.850	17.950	71.800
23	Luna Birjawi (LBN)	13.350	16.550	14.900	14.100	58.900

=== Final ===
Rank	Athlete	Hoop (rhythmic gymnastics)	Ball (rhythmic gymnastics)	Clubs (rhythmic gymnastics)	Ribbon (rhythmic gymnastics)	Total
1st place, gold medalist(s)	Takhmina Ikromova (UZB)	28.650	27.600	28.600	28.100	112.950
2nd place, silver medalist(s)	Wang Qi (CHN)	28.550	26.250	28.950	26.300	110.050
3rd place, bronze medalist(s)	Wang Zilu (CHN)	28.350	26.650	28.000	26.200	109.200
4	Akmaral Yerekesheva (KAZ)	28.900	27.300	25.200	26.600	108.000
5	Aibota Yertaikyzy (KAZ)	27.250	26.450	25.700	26.800	106.200
6	Mirano Kita (JPN)	28.400	24.800	26.150	26.600	105.950
7	Zlata Arkatova (KGZ)	27.850	24.150	26.200	27.500	105.700
8	Seo Eun-chae (KOR)	27.500	25.700	25.400	25.950	104.550
9	Ha Su-yi (KOR)	26.200	25.400	26.400	25.150	103.150
10	Breanna Labadan (PHI)	25.650	25.500	25.100	19.200	95.450
