= Wang Lanjing =

Chinese rhythmic gymnast (born 2005)

- Born: 10 March 2005 (age 21) Zhejiang, China

Gymnastics career
- Discipline: Rhythmic gymnastics
- Country represented: China; (2022-)
- Club: Zhejiang Province
- Head coach: Sun Dan
- Assistant coach: Anastasia Bliznyuk
Medal record
Rhythmic Gymnastics
Representing China
| Event | 1st | 2nd | 3rd |
|---|---|---|---|
| World Championships | 2 | 3 | 2 |
| Asian Championships | 3 | 1 | 2 |
| FIG World Cup | 15 | 7 | 8 |
| Total | 20 | 11 | 12 |
Olympic Games
| Gold medal – first place | 2024 Paris | Group all-around |
World Championships
| Gold medal – first place | 2023 Valencia | 5 Hoops |
| Gold medal – first place | 2025 Rio de Janeiro | 5 Ribbons |
| Silver medal – second place | 2023 Valencia | Group All-around |
| Silver medal – second place | 2023 Valencia | 3 Ribbons + 2 Balls |
| Silver medal – second place | 2026 Frankfurt | 5 Balls |
| Bronze medal – third place | 2025 Rio de Janeiro | 3 Balls + 2 Hoops |
| Bronze medal – third place | 2026 Frankfurt | Team |
Asian Games
| Gold medal – first place | 2026 Aichi-Nagoya | Group All-around |
Asian Championships
| Gold medal – first place | 2023 Manila | Group All-Around |
| Gold medal – first place | 2023 Manila | 5 Hoops |
| Gold medal – first place | 2023 Manila | 3 Ribbons + 2 Balls |
| Silver medal – second place | 2026 Bishkek | Group All-Around |
| Bronze medal – third place | 2023 Manila | Team |
| Bronze medal – third place | 2026 Bishkek | Team |

Wang Lanjing (Chinese: 王澜静; born 10 March 2005) is a Chinese rhythmic gymnast. She is the 2024 Olympic group all-around champion and the 2023 World group all-around silver medalist.

== Personal life ==
She began the sport at around age five at Hangzhou Chenjinglun Sports School, after being scouted by coaches Zhang Rongying and Deng Wanjie, who visited her kindergarten to recruit potential gymnasts. Her dream is to compete at the 2024 Olympic Games in Paris. Her idol is Chinese gymnast Sun Dan who's currently coaching her.

== Career ==
In 2022 she won bronze in the All-Around and silver with 5 hoops at the World Cup in Pesaro. In September she was selected along Guo Qiqi, Hao Ting, Huang Zhangjiayang, Pu Yanzhu and individuals Yue Zhao and Zhao Yating for the World Championships in Sofia, ending 12th in teams, 7th in the All-Around and with 5 hoops and 4th with 3 ribbons & 2 balls.

At the 2023 World Cup in Tashkent the group won gold in the All-Around and both even finals. Weeks later she won gold in the All-Around and silver in the two event finals in Baku. From May 31 to June 3 the group competed at the Asian Championships in Manila, winning bronze in teams along individuals Wang Zilu, Zhao Yating and Zhao Yue, gold in the All-Around, with 5 hoops and with 3 ribbons & 2 balls. In July she travelled to Milan for the last World Cup of the season, getting bronze in the All-Around and with 3 ribbons & 2 balls. in late August Lanjing was selected for the World Championships in Valencia, winning silver in the All-Around and with 3 ribbons & 2 balls as well an historical gold medal with 5 hoops.

In March 2024 she took part in the World Cup in Athens, winning bronze in the All-Around and the two event finals. A month later in Baku they were 5th overall, 4th with 5 hoops, and 5th in the mixed event. Then they won gold in the All-Around and with 5 hoops in Tashkent. In June the group participated in the stage in Milan, winning gold overall and with 5 hoops as well as silver in the mixed event. In August Wang, Ding Xinyi, Guo Qiqi, Hao Ting and Huang Zhangjiayang were selected for the Olympic Games in Paris. There they won an historical gold medal in the final, being only the second time China medalled in the event after 2008's silver.

In 2025, Wang debuted with a renewed group (consisting of herself, Ding Xinyi, Liu Miaoting, Pu Yanzhu and Zhang Xinyi) at the World Cup in Baku, winning silver medal in all-around and mixed apparatus and gold in 5 ribbons. On April 25–27, they won bronze medal in all-around at Tashkent World Cup. They also won gold in 5 ribbons and silver in 3 balls + 2 hoops finals. On July 18–20, they won bronze in all-around and gold in 3 balls + 2 hoops at Milan World Cup. In late August, she was selected to represent China alongside Liu Miaoting, Pu Yanzhu, Ding Xinyi, Zhang Xinyi and Zhao Wanzhu at the 2025 World Championships in Rio de Janeiro, Brazil, where they took 4th place in group all-around. They won gold medal in 5 ribbons and bronze in 3 balls + 2 hoops final.

In 2026, Lanjing and her teammates (Pu Yanzhu, Zhao Wanzhu, Zhang Xinyi, Ding Xinyi, Liu Miaoting) started competition season in late March at Sofia World Cup. They took 4th place in all-around and won gold in 5 Balls final. On April 10-12, they won gold medal in all-around at Tashkent World Cup. They also won gold medals in both apparatus finals. They won gold medal in 5 balls and silver in 3 hoops + 4 clubs final at Baku World Cup. In June, they won gold medals in all-around and both apparatus finals at Beijing World Challenge Cup. In July, they won gold medal in 3 hoops + 4 clubs final and finished 4th in 5 balls final at Milan World Cup. In August, she was selected to represent China alongside Liu Miaoting, Pu Yanzhu, Ding Xinyi, Zhang Xinyi, Wanzhu Zhao at the 2026 World Championships in Frankfurt, Germany. They took 7th place in group all-around, due to mistakes in 3 hoops + 4 clubs routine. They won silver medal in 5 balls final and a historic bronze medal in team competition alongside Wang Zilu and Wang Qi.

== Detailed Olympic results ==
| Year | Competition Description | Location | Music | Apparatus | Rank | Score-Final | Rank | Score-Qualifying |
|---|---|---|---|---|---|---|---|---|
| 2024 | Olympics | Paris | | All-around | 1st | 69.800 | 5th | 67.900 |
| 2024 | Olympics | Paris | Born of Shadows, Loki's Ire, The Seed, Rescue, Can't Help Falling In Love by Audiomachine, Aurora, Tommee Profitt ft. SVRCINA, Raine Wilder & brooke | 5 Hoops | 1st | 36.950 | 5th | 32.850 |
| 2024 | Olympics | Paris | Ming Deng Yin (Promotional song for the Ming Deng Xin Yi version of "Dust White Forbidden Zone") by Guan Dazhou | 3 Ribbons + 2 Balls | 3d | 33.700 | 3rd | 32.400 |
