= Gymnastics at the 2002 Asian Games – Women's rhythmic team =

Women's team at the 2002 Asian Games
- Venue: Sajik Gymnasium
- Date: 8 October 2002
- Competitors: 16 from 4 nations

Medalists
gold medal	China; Sun Dan, Zhang Shuo, Zhong Ling, Zhu Minhong
silver medal	Kazakhstan; Aida Krasnikova, Lola Yeros, Aliya Yussupova, Zaira Zhakupova
bronze medal	South Korea; Cho Eun-jung, Choi Ye-lim, Lee Ji-ae, Yoo Seong-oeun

The women's rhythmic team competition at the 2002 Asian Games in Busan, South Korea was held on 8 October 2002 at the Sajik Gymnasium.

== Schedule ==
All times are Korea Standard Time (UTC+09:00)

Date	Time	Event
Tuesday, 8 October 2002	14:00	Final

== Results ==
Rank	Team	Rope (rhythmic gymnastics)	Hoop (rhythmic gymnastics)	Ball (rhythmic gymnastics)	Clubs (rhythmic gymnastics)	Total
1st place, gold medalist(s)	China (CHN)	73.950	49.600	49.850	76.350	249.750
	Sun Dan	23.800	~~22.850~~		24.500	
	Zhang Shuo			~~23.700~~		
	Zhong Ling	25.900	25.850	25.700	27.450	
	Zhu Minhong	24.250	23.750	24.150	24.400	
2nd place, silver medalist(s)	Kazakhstan (KAZ)	71.100	71.350	72.550	24.950	239.950
	Aida Krasnikova	22.200	22.850		~~22.150~~	
	Lola Yeros		22.350	23.450	~~22.100~~	
	Aliya Yussupova	25.600	26.150	25.650	24.950	
	Zaira Zhakupova	23.300		23.450		
3rd place, bronze medalist(s)	South Korea (KOR)	69.250	22.950	69.400	76.975	238.575
	Cho Eun-jung	22.950	~~20.450~~	23.550	25.500	
	Choi Ye-lim	23.400	22.950		25.575	
	Lee Ji-ae		~~21.600~~	22.900	25.900	
	Yoo Seong-oeun	22.900		22.950		
4	Japan (JPN)	68.600	71.200	71.125	20.925	231.850
	Yukari Murata	23.700	23.900	24.375	20.925	
	Yachiyo Nakamura		23.500	23.350	~~19.950~~	
	Ai Yokochi	22.900	23.800	23.400	~~20.650~~	
	Tomoko Yoshida	22.000				
