= Gymnastics at the 2002 Asian Games – Women's rhythmic individual all-around =

Women's individual all-around at the 2002 Asian Games
- Venue: Sajik Gymnasium
- Date: 8–9 October 2002
- Competitors: 19 from 6 nations

Medalists
gold medal	Zhong Ling	China
silver medal	Aliya Yussupova	Kazakhstan
bronze medal	Yukari Murata	Japan

The women's rhythmic individual all-around competition at the 2002 Asian Games in Busan, South Korea was held on 8 and 9 October 2002 at the Sajik Gymnasium.

== Schedule ==
All times are Korea Standard Time (UTC+09:00)

Date	Time	Event
Tuesday, 8 October 2002	14:00	Qualification
Wednesday, 9 October 2002	15:00	Final

== Results ==
=== Qualification ===
Rank	Athlete	Rope (rhythmic gymnastics)	Hoop (rhythmic gymnastics)	Ball (rhythmic gymnastics)	Clubs (rhythmic gymnastics)	Total
1	Zhong Ling (CHN)	25.900	25.850	~~25.700~~	27.450	79.200
2	Aliya Yussupova (KAZ)	25.600	26.150	25.650	~~24.950~~	77.400
3	Zhu Minhong (CHN)	24.250	~~23.750~~	24.150	24.400	72.800
4	Cho Eun-jung (KOR)	22.950	~~20.450~~	23.550	25.500	72.000
5	Yukari Murata (JPN)	23.700	23.900	24.375	~~20.925~~	71.975
6	Choi Ye-lim (KOR)	23.400	22.950		25.575	71.925
7	Sun Dan (CHN)	23.800	22.850		24.500	71.150
8	Anastasiya Berestetskaya (UZB)	~~22.900~~	23.700	22.900	24.375	70.975
9	Lee Ji-ae (KOR)		21.600	22.900	25.900	70.400
10	Ai Yokochi (JPN)	22.900	23.800	23.400	~~20.650~~	70.100
11	Lola Yeros (KAZ)		22.350	23.450	22.100	67.900
12	Aida Krasnikova (KAZ)	22.200	22.850		22.150	67.200
13	Yachiyo Nakamura (JPN)		23.500	23.350	19.950	66.800
14	Sarina Sundara Rajah (MAS)	~~20.150~~	20.450	21.550	23.000	65.000
15	Elena Podgornova (UZB)	~~18.800~~	20.600	20.200	21.650	62.450
16	Zaira Zhakupova (KAZ)	23.300		23.450		46.750
17	Yoo Seong-oeun (KOR)	22.900		22.950		45.850
18	Zhang Shuo (CHN)			23.700		23.700
19	Tomoko Yoshida (JPN)	22.000				22.000

=== Final ===
Rank	Athlete	Rope (rhythmic gymnastics)	Hoop (rhythmic gymnastics)	Ball (rhythmic gymnastics)	Clubs (rhythmic gymnastics)	Total
1st place, gold medalist(s)	Zhong Ling (CHN)	26.250	26.900	27.500	27.150	107.800
2nd place, silver medalist(s)	Aliya Yussupova (KAZ)	26.600	25.950	26.775	26.950	106.275
3rd place, bronze medalist(s)	Yukari Murata (JPN)	24.350	24.275	25.000	25.775	99.400
4	Zhu Minhong (CHN)	24.750	25.300	24.900	24.200	99.150
5	Anastasiya Berestetskaya (UZB)	24.750	23.300	23.750	23.950	95.750
5	Lola Yeros (KAZ)	25.200	23.100	23.800	23.650	95.750
7	Choi Ye-lim (KOR)	21.575	24.100	23.350	24.350	93.375
8	Cho Eun-jung (KOR)	20.700	23.950	24.200	24.100	92.950
9	Ai Yokochi (JPN)	21.900	23.000	22.550	24.700	92.150
10	Sarina Sundara Rajah (MAS)	22.750	23.300	22.900	22.250	91.200
11	Elena Podgornova (UZB)	21.100	21.000	20.275	22.850	85.225
