= Ding Xinyi =

Chinese rhythmic gymnast (born 2004)

- Born: 27 August 2004 (age 22) Chongqing, China

Gymnastics career
- Discipline: Rhythmic gymnastics
- Country represented: China; (2023-)
- Club: Chongqing
- Head coach: Sun Dan
- Assistant coach: Anastasia Bliznyuk
Medal record
Rhythmic Gymnastics
Representing China
Event	1st	2nd	3rd
World Championships	2	3	2
Asian Championships	3	0	2
FIG World Cup	15	7	8
Total	20	10	12
Olympic Games
Gold medal – first place	2024 Paris	Group all-around
World Championships
Gold medal – first place	2023 Valencia	5 Hoops
Gold medal – first place	2025 Rio de Janeiro	5 Ribbons
Silver medal – second place	2023 Valencia	Group All-around
Silver medal – second place	2023 Valencia	3 Ribbons + 2 Balls
Silver medal – second place	2026 Frankfurt	5 Balls
Bronze medal – third place	2025 Rio de Janeiro	3 Balls + 2 Hoops
Bronze medal – third place	2026 Frankfurt	Team
Asian Games
Gold medal – first place	2026 Aichi-Nagoya	Group All-around
Asian Championships
Gold medal – first place	2023 Manila	Group All-Around
Gold medal – first place	2023 Manila	5 Hoops
Gold medal – first place	2023 Manila	3 Ribbons + 2 Balls
Bronze medal – third place	2023 Manila	Team
Bronze medal – third place	2026 Bishkek	Team

Ding Xinyi (Chinese: 丁欣怡; born 27 August 2004) is a Chinese rhythmic gymnast. She is the 2024 Olympic group all-around champion and the 2023 World group all-around silver medalist.

== Career ==
After taking up the sport in 2010 she became a starter in the senior group in 2023, debuting at the World Cup in Tashkent where the group won gold in the All-Around and both even finals. Weeks later she won gold in the All-Around and silver in the two event finals in Baku. From 31 May to 3 June the group competed at the Asian Championships in Manila, winning bronze in teams along individuals Wang Zilu, Zhao Yating and Zhao Yue, gold in the All-Around, with 5 hoops and with 3 ribbons & 2 balls. In July she travelled to Milan for the last World Cup of the season, getting bronze in the All-Around and with 3 ribbons & 2 balls. in late August Xinyi was selected for the World Championships in Valencia, winning silver in the All-Around and with 3 ribbons & 2 balls as well an historical gold medal with 5 hoops.

In March 2024 she took part in the World Cup in Athens, winning bronze in the All-Around and the two event finals. A month later in Baku they were 5th overall, 4th with 5 hoops, and 5th in the mixed event in Tashkent. In June the group participated in the stage in Milan, winning gold overall and with 5 hoops as well as silver in the mixed event. In August Ding, Wang Lanjing, Guo Qiqi, Hao Ting and Huang Zhangjiayang were selected for the Olympic Games in Paris. There they won an historical gold medal in the final, being only the second time China medalled in the event after 2008's silver.

In 2025, Ding debuted with a renewed group (consisting of herself, Wang Lanjing, Liu Miaoting, Pu Yanzhu and Zhang Xinyi) at the World Cup in Baku, winning silver medal in all-around and mixed apparatus and gold in 5 ribbons. On April 25–27, they won bronze medal in all-around at Tashkent World Cup. They also won gold in 5 ribbons and silver in 3 balls + 2 hoops finals. On July 18–20, they won bronze in all-around and gold in 3 balls + 2 hoops at Milan World Cup. In late August, she was selected to represent China alongside Liu Miaoting, Pu Yanzhu, Wang Lanjing, Zhang Xinyi and Zhao Wanzhu at the 2025 World Championships in Rio de Janeiro, Brazil, where they took 4th place in group all-around. They won gold medal in 5 ribbons and bronze in 3 balls + 2 hoops final.

In 2026, Xinyi and her teammates (Pu Yanzhu, Zhao Wanzhu, Zhang Xinyi, Liu Miaoting, Wang Lanjing) started competition season in late March at Sofia World Cup. They took 4th place in all-around and won gold in 5 Balls final. On April 10-12, they won gold medal in all-around at Tashkent World Cup. They also won gold medals in both apparatus finals. They won gold medal in 5 balls and silver in 3 hoops + 4 clubs final at Baku World Cup. In June, they won gold medals in all-around and both apparatus finals at Beijing World Challenge Cup. In July, they won gold medal in 3 hoops + 4 clubs final and finished 4th in 5 balls final at Milan World Cup. In August, she was selected to represent China alongside Liu Miaoting, Pu Yanzhu, Wang Lanjing, Zhang Xinyi, Wanzhu Zhao at the 2026 World Championships in Frankfurt, Germany. They took 7th place in group all-around, due to mistakes in 3 hoops + 4 clubs routine. They won silver medal in 5 balls final and a historic bronze medal in team competition alongside Wang Zilu and Wang Qi.

== Detailed Olympic results ==
Year	Competition Description	Location	Music	Apparatus	Rank	Score-Final	Rank	Score-Qualifying
2024	Olympics	Paris		All-around	1st	69.800	5th	67.900
2024	Olympics	Paris	Born of Shadows, Loki's Ire, The Seed, Rescue, Can't Help Falling In Love by Audiomachine, Aurora, Tommee Profitt ft. SVRCINA, Raine Wilder & brooke	5 Hoops	1st	36.950	5th	32.850
2024	Olympics	Paris	Ming Deng Yin (Promotional song for the Ming Deng Xin Yi version of "Dust White Forbidden Zone") by Guan Dazhou	3 Ribbons + 2 Balls	3d	33.700	3rd	32.400
