= Zhang Xinyi (rhythmic gymnast) =

Chinese rhythmic gymnast (born 2006)

- 张馨艺
- Born: 31 July 2006 (age 20)

Gymnastics career
- Discipline: Rhythmic gymnastics
- Country represented: China; (2024-)
- Head coach: Sun Dan
- Assistant coach: Anastasia Bliznyuk
Medal record
Rhythmic Gymnastics
Representing China
Event	1st	2nd	3rd
World Championships	1	0	1
FIG World Cup	7	3	2
Total	8	3	3
World Championships
Gold medal – first place	2025 Rio de Janeiro	5 Ribbons
Silver medal – second place	2026 Frankfurt	5 Balls
Bronze medal – third place	2025 Rio de Janeiro	3 Balls + 2 Hoops
Bronze medal – third place	2026 Frankfurt	Team
Asian Games
Gold medal – first place	2026 Aichi-Nagoya	Group All-around
Asian Championships
Gold medal – first place	2026 Bishkek	5 Balls
Gold medal – first place	2026 Bishkek	3 Hoops + 4 Clubs
Silver medal – second place	2026 Bishkek	Group All-Around
Bronze medal – third place	2026 Bishkek	Team

Zhang Xinyi (Chinese: 张馨艺; born 31 July 2006) is a Chinese rhythmic gymnast. She represents China in international competitions as part of the national group.

== Biography ==
In 2017 Zhang won the individual All-Around silver medal of the National Youth Championship at the Sichuan Provincial Championship. In May 2019 she won the first place overall in the preliminary round of the 2nd Youth Games, and in August of the same year she won three gold medals in the competition.

In May 2024 she was the runner-up of the National Championship with the national reserve group. In 2025 she entered the main group making her debut at the World Cup in Baku, where China won gold with 5 ribbons and silver with 3 balls & 2 hoops. At the stage in Tashkent they took bronze in the All-Around, silver with 3 balls & 2 hoops and gold with 5 ribbons. In Milan they were 4th with 5 ribbons and won gold in the mixed event. In August she was selected for the World Championships in Rio de Janeiro along Ding Xinyi, Liu Miaoting, Pu Yanzhu, Wang Lanjing and Wanzhu Zhao. There they were 4th in the All-Around and won bronze with 3 balls & 2 hoops as well as gold with 5 ribbons.

In 2026, Xinyi and her teammates (Pu Yanzhu, Zhao Wanzhu, Liu Miaoting, Ding Xinyi, Wang Lanjing) started competition season in late March at Sofia World Cup. They took 4th place in all-around and won gold in 5 Balls final. On April 10-12, they won gold medal in all-around at Tashkent World Cup. They also won gold medals in both apparatus finals. They won gold medal in 5 balls and silver in 3 hoops + 4 clubs final at Baku World Cup. In June, they won gold medals in all-around and both apparatus finals at Beijing World Challenge Cup. In July, they won gold medal in 3 hoops + 4 clubs final and finished 4th in 5 balls final at Milan World Cup. In August, she was selected to represent China alongside Liu Miaoting, Pu Yanzhu, Wang Lanjing, Ding Xinyi, Wanzhu Zhao at the 2026 World Championships in Frankfurt, Germany. They took 7th place in group all-around, due to mistakes in 3 hoops + 4 clubs routine. They won silver medal in 5 balls final and a historic bronze medal in team competition alongside Wang Zilu and Wang Qi.
