= Zhang Xinyi (disambiguation) =

Zhang Xinyi (born 1981) is a Chinese actor

Zhang Xinyi can also refer to:

- Zhang Xinyi (artistic gymnast) (born 2007), Chinese artistic gymnast
- Zhang Xinyi (rhythmic gymnast) (born 2006), Chinese rhythmic gymnast
- Zhang Xinyi (fencer) (born 2001), Chinese fencer
