= Wanzhu Zhao =

Chinese rhythmic gymnast (born 2006)

- 赵婉竹
- Born: 31 July 2006 (age 20) Liaoning, China

Gymnastics career
- Discipline: Rhythmic gymnastics
- Country represented: China; (2025-)
- Head coach: Sun Dan
- Assistant coach: Anastasia Bliznyuk
Medal record
Rhythmic Gymnastics
Representing China
Event	1st	2nd	3rd
World Championships	1	1	2
FIG World Cup	9	1	1
Total	10	2	3
World Championships
Gold medal – first place	2025 Rio de Janeiro	5 Ribbons
Silver medal – second place	2026 Frankfurt	5 Balls
Bronze medal – third place	2025 Rio de Janeiro	3 Balls + 2 Hoops
Bronze medal – third place	2026 Frankfurt	Team
Asian Championships
Gold medal – first place	2026 Bishkek	5 Balls
Gold medal – first place	2026 Bishkek	3 Hoops + 4 Clubs
Silver medal – second place	2026 Bishkek	Group All-Around
Bronze medal – third place	2026 Bishkek	Team

Wanzhu Zhao (Chinese: 赵婉竹; born 31 July 2006) is a Chinese rhythmic gymnast. She represents China in international competitions as part of the national group.

== Career ==
In May 2024 she was the runner-up of the National Championship with the national reserve group.

In 2025 she entered the main group making her debut at the World Cup in Milan, where China won gold medal in 3 hoops + 4 clubs final and took 4th place with 5 ribbons. In August she was selected for the World Championships in Rio de Janeiro along Ding Xinyi, Liu Miaoting, Pu Yanzhu, Wang Lanjing and Zhang Xinyi. There they were 4th in the all-Around and won bronze with 3 balls & 2 hoops as well as gold with 5 ribbons.

In 2026, Zhao and her teammates (Pu Yanzhu, Zhang Xinyi, Liu Miaoting, Ding Xinyi, Wang Lanjing) started competition season in late March at Sofia World Cup. They took 4th place in all-around and won gold in 5 Balls final. On April 10-12, they won gold medal in all-around at Tashkent World Cup. They also won gold medals in both apparatus finals. In May, the team competed at the 2026 Asian Championships in Bishkek, Kyrgyzstan, and won silver medal in the all-around event and gold medals in both apparatus finals. In June, they won gold medal in all-around and 5 ribbons at Beijing World Challenge Cup. They won gold medal in 5 balls and silver in 3 hoops + 4 clubs final at Baku World Cup. In June, they won gold medals in all-around and both apparatus finals at Beijing World Challenge Cup. In July, they won gold medal in 3 hoops + 4 clubs final and finished 4th in 5 balls final at Milan World Cup. In August, she was selected to represent China alongside Liu Miaoting, Pu Yanzhu, Wang Lanjing, Zhang Xinyi, Ding Xinyi at the 2026 World Championships in Frankfurt, Germany. They took 7th place in group all-around, due to mistakes in 3 hoops + 4 clubs routine. They won silver medal in 5 balls final.
