= Zhang Shuo =

Zhang Shuo may refer to:

- Zhang Yue (Tang Dynasty) (663–730), may often be misread as Zhang Shuo, a Chinese official and chancellor of the Tang Dynasty
- Zhang Shuo (footballer) (born 1983), Chinese football player
- Zhang Shuo (gymnast) (born 1984), Chinese rhythmic gymnast
