= Huang Zhangjiayang =

Chinese rhythmic gymnast

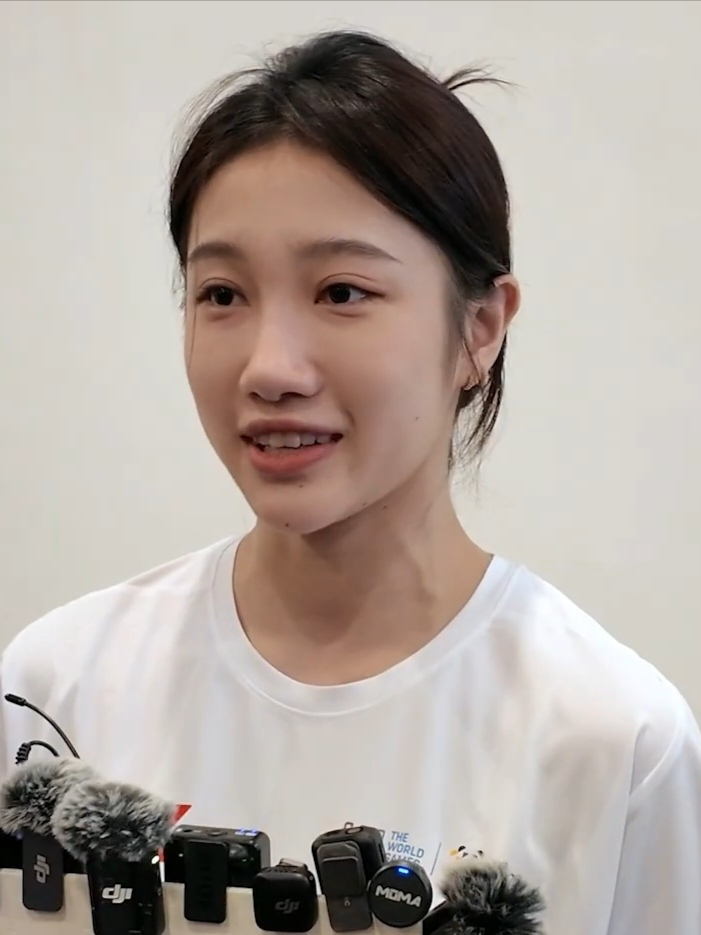
- Huang in 2025

Personal information
- Born: 15 February 2000 (age 26) Sichuan, China

Gymnastics career
- Discipline: Rhythmic gymnastics
- Country represented: China (2018-2024)
- Club: Sichuan Province
- Head coaches: Ren Shuang, Sun Dan
Medal record
Rhythmic Gymnastics
Representing China
Olympic Games
Gold medal – first place	2024 Paris	Group all-around
World Championships
Gold medal – first place	2023 Valencia	5 Hoops
Silver medal – second place	2023 Valencia	Group All-around
Silver medal – second place	2023 Valencia	3 Ribbons + 2 Balls
Asian Championships
Gold medal – first place	2018 Kuala Lumpur	3 Balls + 2 Ropes
Gold medal – first place	2023 Manila	All-Around
Gold medal – first place	2023 Manila	5 Hoops
Gold medal – first place	2023 Manila	3 Ribbons + 2 Balls
Silver medal – second place	2018 Kuala Lumpur	All-Around
Silver medal – second place	2019 Pattaya	3 Hoops + 2 Clubs
Bronze medal – third place	2019 Pattaya	All-Around
Bronze medal – third place	2019 Pattaya	5 Balls
Bronze medal – third place	2023 Manila	Team
FIG World Cup
Event / 1st / 2nd / 3rd; World Cup / 5 / 3 / 4

Huang Zhangjiayang (Chinese: 黄张嘉洋; born 15 February 2000) is a Chinese rhythmic gymnast. She is the 2024 Olympic group all-around champion and also competed in the group all-around at the 2020 Olympic Games where the Chinese group finished fourth.

== Career ==
Huang began rhythmic gymnastics in 2005.

At the 2018 Asian Championships in Kuala Lumpur, she won silver medal in group all-around and gold in 3 balls + 2 ropes. Huang competed at the 2018 World Championships in Sofia alongside Ding Ziyi, Hu Yuhui, Liu Xin, and Xu Yanshu. They finished eleventh in the group all-around and did not qualify for either event final.

Huang was selected to compete for the Chinese group at the 2019 World Championships alongside Hao Ting, Hu Yuhui, Guo Qiqi, Liu Xin, and Xu Yanshu. The Chinese group together finished seventh in the all-around final. Additionally, the group qualified for both event finals where they finished fifth in 5 balls and eighth in 3 hoops + 4 clubs.

Huang was selected to represent China at the 2020 Summer Olympics in the group all-around alongside Hao Ting, Guo Qiqi, Liu Xin, and Xu Yanshu. In the qualification round, they finished fifth and qualified for the final where they finished fourth behind Bulgaria, Russia, and Italy. The same group then competed at the 2021 World Championships and finished fifth in the group all-around. In the event finals, they finished fifth in 5 balls and fourth in 3 hoops + 4 clubs.

Huang won a bronze medal in the group all-around and a silver medal in 5 hoops at the 2022 Pesaro World Cup. She competed at the 2022 World Championships in Sofia and helped the Chinese group finish seventh in the all-around. In the event finals, they finished seventh in 5 hoops and fourth in 3 ribbons + 2 balls.

At the 2023 Tashkent World Cup, Huang and the Chinese group swept the gold medals in the all-around and in both event finals. Weeks later she won gold in the All-Around and silver in the two event finals in Baku. From 31 May to 3 June the group competed at the Asian Championships in Manila, winning bronze in teams along individuals Wang Zilu, Zhao Yating and Zhao Yue, gold in the All-Around, with 5 hoops and with 3 ribbons & 2 balls. In July she travelled to Milan for the last World Cup of the season, getting bronze in the All-Around and with 3 ribbons & 2 balls. in late August Xinyi was selected for the World Championships in Valencia, winning silver in the All-Around and with 3 ribbons & 2 balls as well an historical gold medal with 5 hoops.

In March 2024 she took part in the World Cup in Athens, winning bronze in the All-Around and the two event finals. A month later in Baku they were 5th overall, 4th with 5 hoops, and 5th in the mixed event in Tashkent. In June the group participated in the stage in Milan, winning gold overall and with 5 hoops as well as silver in the mixed event. In August 2024, Huang, Wang Lanjing, Guo Qiqi, Hao Ting and Ding Xinyi were selected to compete at the Olympic Games in Paris. There they won an historical gold medal in the final, being only the second time China medalled in the event after 2008's silver.

== Detailed Olympic results ==
Year	Competition Description	Location	Music	Apparatus	Rank	Score-Final	Rank	Score-Qualifying
2020	Olympics	Tokyo		All-around	4th	84.550	5th	83.600
2020	Olympics	Tokyo	Flying dance by 龙荡 / 鼓破天 by 刘三藏	5 Balls	7th	42.150	6th	41.600
2020	Olympics	Tokyo		3 Hoops + 4 Clubs	4th	42.400	5th	42.000
2024	Olympics	Paris		All-around	1st	69.800	5th	67.900
2024	Olympics	Paris	Born of Shadows, Loki's Ire, The Seed, Rescue, Can't Help Falling In Love by Audiomachine, Aurora, Tommee Profitt ft. SVRCINA, Raine Wilder & brooke	5 Hoops	1st	36.950	5th	32.850
2024	Olympics	Paris	Ming Deng Yin (Promotional song for the Ming Deng Xin Yi version of "Dust White Forbidden Zone") by Guan Dazhou	3 Ribbons + 2 Balls	3d	33.700	3rd	32.400
