= 2004 Asian Rhythmic Gymnastics Championships =

International rhythmic gymnastics competition

The 2004 Asian Rhythmic Gymnastics Championships was held in Yangzhou, China, June 10–13, 2004.

== Medal winners ==
Event	Gold	Silver	Bronze
Team
Team	China; Sun Dan; Ling Zhong; Zhang Shuo	Japan; Yukari Murata; Ai Yokochi; Yachiyo Nakamura; Yoshie Hayashi	Malaysia; Fong Seow Ting; See Hui Yee; Rosli Nashihin
Individual
All-around	Sun Dan; China	Ling Zhong; China	Fong Seow Ting; Malaysia
Hoop	Fong Seow Ting; Malaysia	Ling Zhong; China	Sun Dan; China
Ball	Ling Zhong; China	Sun Dan; China	Yukari Murata; Japan
Clubs	Sun Dan; China	Ling Zhong; China	Olesya Ashaeva; Uzbekistan
Ribbon	Yukari Murata; Japan	Ling Zhong; China	Sun Dan; China
Group
All-around	China	Japan	South Korea
Group 5 ribbons	China	Japan	South Korea
Group 3 hoops + 2 balls	China	South Korea	Japan
