= Emilia Ekandjo =

Namibian rhythmic gymnast (born 2005)

- Born: November 15, 2005 (age 20) Windhoek, Namibia

Gymnastics career
- Discipline: Rhythmic gymnastics
- Country represented: Namibia
- Club: Windhoek Rhythmic Club
- Head coach: Wiesta Snyman

Emilia Ekandjo (born 15 November, 2005) is a Namibian individual rhythmic gymnast.

== Career ==
Ekanjdo began rhythmic gymnastics around 2018 after previously studying ballet. A classmate recommended the sport to her.

In 2022, Ekandjo and her teammate, Shayna Schutte, intended to compete at the 2022 Commonwealth Games held in Birmingham, England. However, due to a legal dispute over which organization was the national governing body of gymnastics in Namibia, they were not given International Gymnastics Federation (FIG) licenses in time to compete. Both organizations claiming to be the governing body were suspended by the Gymnastics Ethics Foundation, and the FIG said they could not do anything to provide licenses without a further ruling. Ekandjo and Schutte were offered the opportunity to compete out of competition, but they did not do so.

Later in 2022, Ekandjo participated in her first international competition, the Happy Cup in Belgium, despite an injured ankle. In 2024, at the African Championships, she placed 17th in the all-around.

In 2025, Ekandjo qualified for the 2025 World Championships after winning a quota at the 2025 African Championships, where she placed 9th; it was the first time since 2014 that a Namibian gymnast would compete at the World Championships. Ekandjo said after she was selected, "Being selected for such a prestigious event is challenging, especially from a country where rhythmic gymnastics is still growing. But my pride kicked in after realising that all my years of sacrifice and relentless training have been recognised." In August, Ekandjo, who has experienced recurring ankle and back injuries, competed at the World Championships with an injured ankle and also struggled with nervousness. She placed 96th out of 97 individual athletes.

Afterward, she, her coach, and the federation began working more on mental preparedness and mental health. This included beginning to see a sport psychologist. In November, at the Namibia Annual Sport Awards, she was selected for the People's Choice Sport Star of the Year award.

At the 2026 African Championships, Ekandjo placed 12th, and Namibia again won a quota for the 2026 World Championships. Ahead of the World Championships, she trained with Aimee van Rooyen to finalize her routines. Ekandjo said she would be better prepared for the environment at the World Championships after her experience the previous year, and that she was focusing more on injury prevention and mental training compared to the year before. In an interview at the Championships, Ekandjo noted how important participation at the event was to help develop the sport in Namibia, and she stated that she felt she was better able to deal with mistakes due to her mental training: "I mean, yes, it's devastating, but if it was last year, I think I'd have probably cried in the Kiss and Cry. But now I'm like — okay, it's just a way for me to improve now, and then I can just go do better from here." She finished 91st out of 93 gymnasts in the qualification round.

== Personal life ==
Ekandjo is a student at Namibia University of Science and Technology, studying procurement and supply chain management.
