= Yuliya Valevataya =

Uzbekistani rhythmic gymnast (born 2008)

- Born: 2008 (age 17–18) Fergana Region

Gymnastics career
- Discipline: Rhythmic gymnastics
- Country represented: Uzbekistan; (2024-present)
Medal record
Rhythmic gymnastics
Representing Uzbekistan
Event	1st	2nd	3rd
FIG World Cup	0	0	2
Total	0	0	2
Asian Championships
Gold medal – first place	2026 Bishkek	Team
Gold medal – first place	2026 Bishkek	Group All-Around

Yuliya Valevataya (born 2008) is an Uzbek rhythmic gymnast. She represents Uzbekistan in international competitions as part of the senior group.

== Career ==
Valevataya became age-eligible for senior international competition in 2024, joining the reserve senior group. In June she competed in the BRICS Games in Kazan, winning silver in the All-Around along Yasmina Mkrtycheva, Kamilla Kagirova, Nikol Zilotova, Madina Yunusova and Diana Khakimova.

In 2026 she was incorporated into the main group, debuting at the Gymnastik International in Fellbach, winning gold with 3 hoops & 2 clubs and silver with 5 balls. Later in March the group competed in World Cup in Sofia where Uzbekistan won bronze with 5 balls.
