= Liu Xin (gymnast) =

Chinese rhythmic gymnast

- Born: 12 October 1999 (age 26) Guangxi, China

Gymnastics career
- Discipline: Rhythmic gymnastics
- Country represented: China
- Club: Shanghai Province
- Head coaches: Huang Yijun, Sun Dan
Medal record
Rhythmic Gymnastics
Representing China
Asian Championships
Bronze medal – third place	2019 Pattaya	All-Around
Bronze medal – third place	2019 Pattaya	5 Balls
Silver medal – second place	2019 Pattaya	3 Hoops + 2 Clubs

Liu Xin (born 12 October 1999) is a Chinese rhythmic gymnast. She competed in the group all-around at the 2020 Olympic Games where the Chinese group finished fourth.

== Career ==
Liu competed with the junior Chinese group at the 2014 Pacific Rim Championships in Richmond, British Columbia, and they won the gold medal in the all-around.

Liu competed at the 2018 World Championships in Sofia alongside Ding Ziyi, Hu Yuhui, Huang Zhangjiayang, and Xu Yanshu. They finished eleventh in the group all-around and did not qualify for either event final.

Liu was selected to compete for the Chinese group at the 2019 World Championships alongside Hao Ting, Hu Yuhui, Guo Qiqi, Huang Zhangjiayang, and Xu Yanshu. The Chinese group together finished seventh in the all-around final. Additionally, the group qualified for both event finals where they finished fifth in 5 balls and eighth in 3 hoops + 4 clubs.

Liu was selected to represent China at the 2020 Summer Olympics in the group all-around alongside Hao Ting, Guo Qiqi, Huang Zhangjiayang, and Xu Yanshu. In the qualification round, they finished fifth and qualified into the final where they finished fourth behind Bulgaria, Russia, and Italy. The same group then competed at the 2021 World Championships and finished fifth in the group all-around. In the event finals, they finished fifth in 5 balls and fourth in 3 hoops + 4 clubs.
