= Xu Yanshu =

Chinese rhythmic gymnast

- Nickname: Shanshan
- Born: 14 July 1998 (age 28) Liaoning, China
- Height: 171 cm (5 ft 7 in)

Gymnastics career
- Discipline: Rhythmic gymnastics
- Country represented: China
- Club: Liaoning Province
- Head coach: Sun Dan
Medal record
Rhythmic Gymnastics
Representing China
Asian Championships
Bronze medal – third place	2019 Pattaya	All-Around
Bronze medal – third place	2019 Pattaya	5 Balls
Silver medal – second place	2019 Pattaya	3 Hoops + 2 Clubs

Xu Yanshu (born 14 July 1998) is a Chinese rhythmic gymnast. She competed in the group all-around at the 2020 Olympic Games where the Chinese group finished fourth, and she competed at the 2017, 2018, 2019, and 2021 World Championships.

== Career ==
Xu was a dancer before being recruited by the Liaoning Province rhythmic gymnastics team when she was eight years old.

Xu competed at the 2017 World Championships and helped the Chinese group finish eighth in the all-around. They also qualified for both event finals, finishing seventh in 5 hoops and eighth in 3 balls + 2 ropes. She was selected to compete at the 2018 World Championships in Sofia alongside Ding Ziyi, Hu Yuhui, Liu Xin, and Huang Zhangjiayang. They finished eleventh in the group all-around and did not qualify for either event final.

Xu was selected to compete for the Chinese group at the 2019 World Championships alongside Hao Ting, Hu Yuhui, Guo Qiqi, Liu Xin, and Huang Zhangjiayang. The Chinese group together finished seventh in the all-around final. Additionally, the group qualified for both event finals where they finished fifth in 5 balls and eighth in 3 hoops + 4 clubs.

Xu was selected to represent China at the 2020 Summer Olympics in the group all-around alongside Hao Ting, Guo Qiqi, Liu Xin, and Huang Zhangjiayang. In the qualification round, they finished fifth and qualified into the final where they finished fourth behind Bulgaria, Russia, and Italy. The same group then competed at the 2021 World Championships in Kitakyushu and finished fifth in the group all-around. In the event finals, they finished fifth in 5 balls and fourth in 3 hoops + 4 clubs.
