= Diana Khakimova =

Uzbekistani rhythmic gymnast (born 2008)

- Диана Хакимова
- Born: 9 August 2008 (age 18) Tashkent

Gymnastics career
- Discipline: Rhythmic gymnastics
- Country represented: Uzbekistan; (2023-present)
Medal record
Rhythmic gymnastics
Representing Uzbekistan
Event	1st	2nd	3rd
FIG World Cup	0	0	2
Total	0	0	2
Junior Asian Championships
Gold medal – first place	2023 Manila	Group All-Around
Silver medal – second place	2023 Manila	5 Balls
Silver medal – second place	2023 Manila	5 Ropes

Diana Khakimova (Russian: Диана Хакимова; born 9 August 2008) is an Uzbek rhythmic gymnast. She represents Uzbekistan in international competitions as part of the senior group.

== Career ==
=== Junior ===
In 2023 she was selected for the 2nd Junior World Championships in Cluj-Napoca along Adelya Fayzulina, Sabina Gadaeva, Yasmina Mkrtycheva, Amaliya Mamedova and Guli Nasimboeva. There they were 15th in the All-Around, 19th with 5 balls, 12th with 5 ropes and 6th in teams. At the 2023 Asian Championships in Manila, she won a gold medal with Uzbekistan's junior group in the all-around. Additionally, the group won silver medals in both event finals.

=== Senior ===
Khakimova became age-eligible for senior international competition in 2024, joining the reserve senior group. In June she competed in the BRICS Games in Kazan, winning silver in the All-Around along Yuliya Valevataya, Kamilla Kagirova, Nikol Zilotova, Madina Yunusova and Yasmina Mkrtycheva.

In March she debuted with Uzbekistan's reserve group at the Grand Prix in Moscow, winning silver in the All-Around and bronze with 3 hoops & 4 clubs. The following month she competed at the World Cup in Baku, being 11th overall and winning bronze with 5 balls. At the World Challenge Cup in Beijing the group was 5th in the All-Around and won again bronze with 5 balls. In July they took part in the World Cup's stage in Milan, being 14th overall. She was then selected, alongside Yosina Djuraeva, Irodakhon Sadikova, Milana Safina and Sofiya Usova, for the Asian Games in Nagoya where the group took 4th place in the final.
