= Yasmina Mkrtycheva =

Uzbekistani rhythmic gymnast (born 2008)

- Ясмина Мкртычева
- Born: 29 May 2008 (age 18) Tashkent

Gymnastics career
- Discipline: Rhythmic gymnastics
- Country represented: Uzbekistan; (2023-present)
Medal record
Rhythmic gymnastics
Representing Uzbekistan
Event	1st	2nd	3rd
FIG World Cup	0	0	2
Total	0	0	2
Asian Championships
Gold medal – first place	2026 Bishkek	Team
Gold medal – first place	2026 Bishkek	Group All-Around
Junior Asian Championships
Gold medal – first place	2023 Manila	Group All-Around
Silver medal – second place	2023 Manila	5 Balls
Silver medal – second place	2023 Manila	5 Ropes

Yasmina Mkrtycheva (Russian: Ясмина Мкртычева; born 29 May 2008) is an Uzbek rhythmic gymnast. She represents Uzbekistan in international competitions as part of the senior group.

== Career ==
In June 2018 Mkrtycheva won gold among gymnasts born in 2008 at the Uzbek Championships.

=== Junior ===
In 2023 she was selected for the 2nd Junior World Championships in Cluj-Napoca along Adelya Fayzulina, Sabina Gadaeva, Diana Khakimova, Amaliya Mamedova and Guli Nasimboeva. There they were 15th in the All-Around, 19th with 5 balls, 12th with 5 ropes and 6th in teams. At the 2023 Asian Championships in Manila, she won a gold medal with Uzbekistan's junior group in the all-around. Additionally, the group won silver medals in both event finals.

=== Senior ===
She became age-eligible for senior international competition in 2024, joining the reserve senior group. In June she competed in the BRICS Games in Kazan, winning silver in the All-Around along Yuliya Valevataya, Kamilla Kagirova, Nikol Zilotova, Madina Yunusova and Diana Khakimova.

In 2026 she was incorporated into the main group, debuting at the Gymnastik International in Fellbach, winning gold with 3 hoops & 2 clubs and silver with 5 balls. Later in March the group competed in the World Cup in Sofia where Uzbekistan won bronze with 5 balls.
