= Akmaral Yerekesheva =

Kazakhstani rhythmic gymnast

- Ақмарал Ерекешева
- Born: 20 March 2010 (age 16) Kazakhstan

Gymnastics career
- Discipline: Rhythmic gymnastics
- Country represented: Kazakhstan, Astana; (2023-present)
- Head coach: Balginbayeva Meruert Tulegenovna
- Choreographer: Aydys Saaya Alekseevna
Medal record
Representing Kazakhstan
Rhythmic gymnastics
Event	1st	2nd	3rd
World Cup	0	0	1
Grand Prix	1	4	0
Total	1	4	1
Asian Championships
Silver medal – second place	2026 Bishkek	Team
Silver medal – second place	2026 Bishkek	Clubs
Bronze medal – third place	2026 Bishkek	Hoop
Bronze medal – third place	2026 Bishkek	Ball
Junior World Championships
Gold medal – first place	2025 Sofia	Ball
Gold medal – first place	2025 Sofia	Ribbon
Silver medal – second place	2025 Sofia	Hoop
Asian Junior Championships
Gold medal – first place	2024 Tashkent	Ribbon
Gold medal – first place	2025 Singapore	Ball
Gold medal – first place	2025 Singapore	Ribbon
Silver medal – second place	2024 Tashkent	All-Around
Silver medal – second place	2024 Tashkent	Ball
Silver medal – second place	2025 Singapore	All-Around
Silver medal – second place	2025 Singapore	Team
Silver medal – second place	2025 Singapore	Clubs
Bronze medal – third place	2024 Tashkent	Clubs
Grand Prix
Gold medal – first place	2026 Brno	Hoop
Silver medal – second place	2026 Brno	Ball
Silver medal – second place	2026 Brno	Clubs
Silver medal – second place	2026 Brno	Ribbon
Silver medal – second place	2026 Brno	All-Around

Aqmaral Erekeşeva (Note: Often transliterated as Akmaral Yerekesheva through a Russified Romanization of Акмарал Ерекешева.) (Kazakh Cyrillic: Ақмарал Ерекешева; born 20 March 2010) is a Kazakh rhythmic gymnast. She's a multiple World and Asian junior Championships medalist.

== Personal life ==
She has one sister Adel, who also competes in rhythmic gymnastics.

== Career ==
Akmaral took up rhythmic gymnastics at the age of 4.

=== Junior ===
In March 2023, Yerekesheva made her international debut at the Aphrodite Cup in Greece, winning silver in the All-Around among those born in 2010.

In 2024, at the same tournament, she won gold in the All-Around and silver with clubs as well as bronze with ball. In May she was selected for the Asian Championships in Tashkent, there she won gold team, gold with ribbon, silver in the All-Around and with ball and bronze with clubs. In July she was the silver medalist in the All-Around and won bronze with clubs and ribbon at the VIII Games of the Children of Asia held in Yakutia. In October, she won gold medal in all-around at Kazakhstani National Championships.

In March 2025, she won gold in the All-Around junior, silver with hoop and with clubs, gold with ball and ribbon at the Aphrodite Cup. Then she competed at International tournament AGF Trophy in Baku, Azerbaijan, and won gold medals in team, ball and ribbon and silver medal in hoop. In April, she won gold medal in all-around at Kazakhstani National Championships. On May 16-18, she competed at the 2025 Asian Championships in Singapore. She won silver medals in all-around, team and clubs and gold medals in ball and ribbon.

In June, she was selected to represent Kazakhstan at the 2025 Junior World Championships in Sofia, Bulgaria, where she won gold medals in ball and ribbon and silver medal in hoop final. For the first time in the history of Kazakhstan — a two-time junior world champion in rhythmic gymnastics.

=== Senior ===
In February 2026, she had her first competition as a senior, where she became the Kazakhstani national all-around champion in front of Aibota Yertaikyzy. She also won gold medals in ball and clubs and silver in hoop and ribbon. In March, she made her senior international debut at Aphrodite Cup in Greece and won gold medal in all-around ahead of Andreea Verdes. In finals, she got gold in clubs and silver in ball. In early April, she competed at Thiais Grand Prix and took bronze medal in all-around behind Alina Harnasko and Mariia Borisova. She won silver medals in hoop and ribbon and bronze medal in clubs final. On April 17-19, she made her World Cup debut at Baku World Cup, where she took 10th place in all-around and won bronze medal in ribbon final.

In May, she competed at the 2026 Asian Championships in Bishkek, and won team silver medal alongside Aibota Yertaikyzy and senior group. She placed 6th in the all-around final and won bronze medals in hoop and ball, and silver in clubs final. In June, she won bronze medals in clubs and ribbon at Liga Iberdola in Spain. In July, she competed at Milan World Cup and took 11th place in all-around, and did not qualify to any apparatus finals.

In August, she was selected to represent Kazakhstan at the 2026 World Championships in Frankfurt, Germany, alongside Aibota Yertaikyzy and senior group. In her senior World Championships debut, she ended on 8th place in all-around qualifications and earned Kazakhstan a spot in the all-around final, for the first time after Elzhana Taniyeva in 2022. She also qualified to two apparatus finals, finishing 5th in clubs and 8th in ribbon. In September, she won silver medal in all-around behind Taisiia Onofriichuk at Brno Grand Prix. She also won gold in hoop and silver in ball and clubs finals. In October, she competed at the 2026 Asian Games and took first place in the all-around qualifications. She ended on 4th place in the all-around final, after big mistakes in clubs routine.

== Routine music information ==
Year	Apparatus	Music title
2026	Hoop	Рух by Президенттік оркестр / Сауыт by Ибрагим Ескендір
2026	Ball	Duck Duck Goose by Power-Haus & Joni Fuller
2026	Clubs	Unshakable March by Цифей / Main theme (from Pirates of the Caribbean)
2026	Ribbon	Nah Neh Nah by Vaya Con Dios
2025	Hoop	Рух by Президенттік оркестр / Сауыт by Ибрагим Ескендір
2025	Ball	Perhaps, perhaps, perhaps by The Pussycat Dolls
2025	Clubs	Revolt by Nathan Lanier
2025	Ribbon	The Terry Theme From Limelight by Billy Vaughn and his Orchestra / Paris By Night by Bob Sinclar

== Competitive highlights ==
(Team competitions in seniors are held only at the World Championships, Europeans and other Continental Games.)

International: Senior
Year	Event	AA	Team	Hoop	Ball	Clubs	Ribbon
2026	Asian Games	4th					
2026	Grand Prix Brno	2nd		1st	2nd	2nd	2nd
2026	World Championships Frankfurt	6th	11th	42nd (Q)	16th (Q)	5th	8th
2026	World Cup Milan	11th		13th (Q)	18th (Q)	9th (Q)	12th (Q)
2026	Asian Championships Bishkek	6th	2nd	3rd	3rd	2nd	4th
2026	World Cup Baku	10th		6th	13th (Q)	27th (Q)	3rd
2026	Grand Prix Thiais	3rd		2nd	4th	3rd	2nd
2026	IT Aphrodite Cup	1st		10th (Q)	2nd	1st	5th
International: Junior
Year	Event	AA	Team	Hoop	Ball	Clubs	Ribbon
2025	Junior World Championships		14th	2nd	1st		1st
2025	Junior Asian Championships	2nd	2nd		1st	2nd	1st
2025	IT AGF Trophy		1st	2nd	1st		1st
2025	IT Aphrodite Cup	1st		2nd	1st	2nd	1st
2024	Junior Asian Championships	2nd	1st		2nd	3rd	1st
National: Senior
Year	Event	AA	Team	Hoop	Ball	Clubs	Ribbon
2026	Kazakhstani National Championships	1st		2nd	1st	1st	2nd
National: Junior
Year	Event	AA	Team	Hoop	Ball	Clubs	Ribbon
2025	Kazakhstani National Championships	1st					
2024	Kazakhstani National Championships	1st					
Q = Qualifications (Did not advance to Event Final due to the 2 gymnast per country rule, only Top 8 highest score); WR = World Record; WD = Withdrew; NT = No Team Competition; OC = Out of Competition(competed but scores not counted for qualifications/results)
