= Zlata Arkatova =

Kyrgyzstani rhythmic gymnast

- Злата Аркатова
- Born: 28 July 2010 (age 16) Bishkek, Kyrgyzstan

Gymnastics career
- Discipline: Rhythmic gymnastics
- Country represented: Kyrgyzstan; (2024-)
- Club: AK Bars Club Bishkek
- Head coach: Zhany Kaimazarova
Medal record
Rhythmic Gymnastics
Representing Kyrgyzstan
Junior World Championships
Gold medal – first place	2025 Sofia	Clubs
Asian Junior Championships
Bronze medal – third place	2024 Tashkent	Team

Zlata Olegovna Arkatova (Russian: Злата Аркатова; born 28 July 2010) is a Kyrgyzstani rhythmic gymnast. She represents Kyrgyzstan in international competitions.

== Biography ==
In 2021 Arkatova won silver in the All-Around at the Bishkek City Championship. In 2023 she won gold overall in the same tournament.

=== Junior ===
In March 2024 she won silver and bronze at the Moscow Grand Prix. In May she was selected to compete with clubs at the Asian Championships in Tashkent, taking 5th place in the final. She and her teammates won bronze medal in team competition.

The following year she participated in the 2025 Asian Championships, she was 4th in teams and 5th in the junior clubs final. In June she was selected for the 2025 Junior World Championships in Sofia, being 16th with ball and winning an historic gold medal with clubs, in front of Farida Bahnas and Kseniya Zhyzhych, that being the first gold and medal overall for Kyrgyzstan at the World Championships at either junior and senior level.

=== Senior ===
In 2026, Zlata started competing as a senior. On April 3-5, she made her senior international debut at AGF Trophy International tournament in Baku. She took silver medal in all-around and bronze in team competition. Then she competed at Tashkent World Cup, her first World Cup, and finished on 24th place in all-around. In May, she competed at the 2026 Asian Championships in Bishkek, and placed 8th in the all-around final. She qualified to ball final, finishing 4th. In July, she took 42nd place in all-around at Milan World Cup. In August, she was selected to represent Kyrgyzstan alongside Asel Arapova at the 2026 World Championships in Frankfurt, Germany. She finished on 28th place in all-around qualifications, which is by far the best result for Kyrgyzstan. She was most successful with ribbon, finishing on 15th place in qualifications. In October, she competed at the 2026 Asian Games in Nagoya, Japan, and qualified to the all-around final from sixth place. In the end, she took 7th place in the all-around final.

== Achievements ==
- First Kyrgyzstani rhythmic gymnast to win a medal in an individual apparatus final at World Championships at both junior and senior level.
- First Kyrgyzstani rhythmic gymnast to win a gold medal in an individual apparatus final at World Championships.

== Routine music information ==
Year	Apparatus	Music title
2026	Hoop	Carmen by Marcin
2026	Ball	You Should Be Dancing by Bee Gees
2026	Clubs	Adrenaline (Extended Version) by Mendez
2026	Ribbon	BOOM BOOM (John Lee Hooker cover) by 2WEI
2025	Hoop	
2025	Ball	Spicy Margarita by Jason Derulo & Michael Bublé
2025	Clubs	Adrenaline (Extended Version) by Mendez
2025	Ribbon	
