= Asel Arapova =

Kyrgyzstani rhythmic gymnast

- Асел Арапова
- Born: 3 July 2010 (age 16) Bishkek, Kyrgyzstan

Gymnastics career
- Discipline: Rhythmic gymnastics
- Country represented: Kyrgyzstan; (2024-)
- Head coach: Natalia Belugina

Asel Arapova (Kyrgyz: Асел Арапова; born 3 July 2010) is a Kyrgyzstani rhythmic gymnast. She represents Kyrgyzstan in international competitions.

== Career ==
=== Junior ===
After becoming a junior, in April 2024 Arapova competed in the BRICS Games in Kazan, winning silver with ribbon, bronze with ball, with clubs and in free-hands.

The following year she participated in the 2025 Asian Championships, she was 4th in teams and 4th in the junior ribbon final. In June she was selected for the 2025 Junior World Championships in Sofia, being 15th with hoop and 17th with ribbon. Two months later she won silver, behind Kseniia Savinova, at the Aeon Cup in Tokyo.

=== Senior ===
Arapova became age eligible for senior competitions in 2026. Debuting at the World Cup in Baku she was 38th in the All-Around. In May, she competed at the 2026 Asian Championships in Bishkek, and placed 10th overall, 11th with hoop, 14th with ball, 9th with clubs and 7th with ribbon. In August, she was selected to represent Kyrgyzstan alongside Zlata Arkatova and the national group at the 2026 World Championships in Frankfurt. In Germany she took 60th place in the All-Around, her best performance was with clubs where she finished in 30th place. In October, she competed at the 2026 Asian Games in Nagoya, finishing 15th in the qualifying round and thus not making the final.

== Routine music information ==
Year	Apparatus	Music title
2026	Hoop	Belief by Otyken
2026	Ball	Ameno (2010 Remix) by ERA / Générique by Maïdi Roth
2026	Clubs	Лезгинка дагестанская by AiSeR
2026	Ribbon	

== Competitive highlights ==
Year	Event	Team	AA	Hoop	Ball	Clubs	Ribb.
International
2025	Aeon Cup		2nd J				
