= Zhong Ling (gymnast) =

Chinese rhythmic gymnast

Zhong Ling 钟玲
- Born: October 30, 1983 (age 42) Guangxi, China

Gymnastics career
- Discipline: Rhythmic gymnastics
- Country represented: China
- Head coach: Pang Qiong
- Assistant coach: Wang Lianqi
- Choreographer: Pang Qiong
- Retired: 2005
Medal record
Representing China
Asian Games
Gold medal – first place	2002 Busan	All-Around
Gold medal – first place	2002 Busan	Team
Summer Universiade
Silver medal – second place	2001 Beijing	Hoop
Bronze medal – third place	2001 Beijing	Ball
Asian Championships
Gold medal – first place	2004 Yangzhou	Ball
Silver medal – second place	2004 Yangzhou	All-Around
Silver medal – second place	2004 Yangzhou	Hoop
Silver medal – second place	2004 Yangzhou	Clubs
Silver medal – second place	2004 Yangzhou	Ribbon

Zhong Ling (born October 30, 1983, in Guangxi, China) is one of China's most successful individual rhythmic gymnasts.

== Career ==
She started rhythmic gymnastics in 1991 and her first international event was in 1995. She trained at the Beijing Sports University. Zhong had her highest placement finishing 9th in All-around at the 2001 World Championships in Madrid, Spain. She competed at the 2004 Athens Olympics where she finished 15th in All-around.

An annual Zhong Ling Cup is held in China.
