= Zhang Shuo (gymnast) =

Chinese rhythmic gymnast

- Full name: 章硕
- Born: January 5, 1984 (age 42) Liaoning
- Height: 170 cm (5 ft 7 in)

Gymnastics career
- Discipline: Rhythmic gymnastics
- Country represented: China
- Club: Beijing Sports University
- Head coach: Xia Yangfei
- Choreographer: Xia Yangfei
- Music: Fight by Rob; Evensong
Medal record
Olympic Games
Silver medal – second place	2008 Beijing	Group
Asian Championships
Gold medal – first place	2004 Yangzhou	Team
Asian Games
Gold medal – first place	2002 Busan	Team
National Games
Silver medal – second place	2005 Nanjing	Team
Silver medal – second place	2005 Nanjing	Individual
Bronze medal – third place	2001 Guangzhou	Individual

Zhang Shuo (Chinese: 章硕; pinyin: Zhāng Shuò; born January 5, 1984, in Liaoning) is a Chinese rhythmic gymnast. She won the individual/group gold medal at the 2002 Asian Games.

She represented China at the 2008 Summer Olympics and won a silver medal in the group competition.
