= Wang Qi (gymnast) =

Chinese rhythmic gymnast

- 王淇
- Born: 16 September 2010 (age 16) China

Gymnastics career
- Discipline: Rhythmic gymnastics
- Country represented: China; (2024-present)
- Former coach: Amina Zaripova
Medal record
Representing China
Rhythmic gymnastics
Event	1st	2nd	3rd
World Challenge Cup	1	4	0
Total	1	4	0
World Championships
Bronze medal – third place	2026 Frankfurt	Team
Asian Games
Silver medal – second place	2026 Aichi-Nagoya	All-Around
Asian Championships
Bronze medal – third place	2026 Bishkek	Team
Junior World Championships
Silver medal – second place	2025 Sofia	Ball
Asian Junior Championships
Gold medal – first place	2024 Tashkent	All-Around
Gold medal – first place	2025 Singapore	All-Around
Gold medal – first place	2025 Singapore	Hoop
Gold medal – first place	2025 Singapore	Clubs
Silver medal – second place	2024 Tashkent	Hoop
Bronze medal – third place	2024 Tashkent	Ribbon
Bronze medal – third place	2025 Singapore	Ball
Bronze medal – third place	2025 Singapore	Ribbon
Gymnasiades
Gold medal – first place	Bahrain 2024	All-around
Gold medal – first place	Bahrain 2024	Ball
Gold medal – first place	Bahrain 2024	Clubs
Gold medal – first place	Bahrain 2024	Ribbon

Wang Qi (Chinese: 王淇; born 16 September 2010) is a Chinese rhythmic gymnast. She is the 2026 Asian Games all-around silver medalist and a two-time (2024, 2025) Asian Junior all-around champion.

== Biography ==
At the 2020 National Youth Rhythmic Gymnastics Championships, 10-year-old Wang became the Chinese pre-junior champion. In 2023 she won all the gold medals at the Chinese Championships.

=== Junior ===
She made her breakthrough as a junior in 2024, when she won gold in the all-around, silver with hoop and bronze with ribbon at the Asian Championships in Tashkent. In November she was selected for the Gymnasiade in Bahrain, winning gold in the all-around, with ball, clubs and ribbon.

Since January 2025, she has been coached by Amina Zaripova. In May she was selected for the Asian Championships in Singapore as the sole representative of China among juniors. There she won gold in the all-around, with hoop and with clubs as well as bronze with ball and ribbon. It was then announced she would participate in the Chinese Championships. In June, she was selected to represent China at the 2025 Junior World Championships in Sofia, Bulgaria, where she won silver medal with ball and took 4th place in ribbon final. In November, she competed at the 15th National Games held in Guangdong, where she won silver in all-around behind Wang Zilu.

=== Senior ===
Wang became age eligible for senior competitions in 2026. She made her senior debut at Sofia World Cup, taking 19th place in all-around. She qualified to her first World Cup apparatus final (with ball), and finished 7th. At Tashkent World Cup she took 11th place in all-around and 4th place in ball final. In May, she competed at the 2026 Asian Championships in Bishkek, and won team bronze medal alongside Wang Zilu and senior group. She placed 4th in the all-around final, 0.4 point behind bronze medal. In June, she won gold medal in all-around at World Challenge Cup in Beijing, claiming first ever individual all-around win by a Chinese gymnast in the World Cup series. She won silver medals in all four apparatus finals. In July, she took 18th place in all-around at Milan World Cup.

In August, she represented China at the 2026 World Championships in Frankfurt, Germany. Together with Wang Zilu and senior group she won historic bronze medal in team competition. She ended on 10th place in the all-around final. She also qualified to two apparatus finals (clubs, ribbon), finishing 7th in both. In October, she competed at the 2026 Asian Games and took second place in all-around qualifications and won silver medal in the all-around final behind Takhmina Ikromova.

== Achievements ==
- She is the first and only Chinese individual gymnast to have won a gold medal in the all-around competition at a World Cup.

== Routine music information ==
Year	Apparatus	Music title
2026	Hoop	
2026	Ball	Svanrand (Live) by Heilung
2026	Clubs	Let Me Think About It (Fedde Le Grand Club Mix) by Ida Corr
2026	Ribbon	碧苍战歌 by 杨秉音
2025	Hoop	星河歎之歡悅(伴奏) by Seven Kwan
2025	Ball	Filiae Mestae Jerusalem, RV 638: "Sileant Zephyri" by Philippe Jaroussky
2025	Clubs	Run The World (Girls) by Beyonce
2025	Ribbon	Run by Ludovico Einaudi & I Virtuosi Italiani
