= Wang Zilu =

Chinese rhythmic gymnast

- 王子露
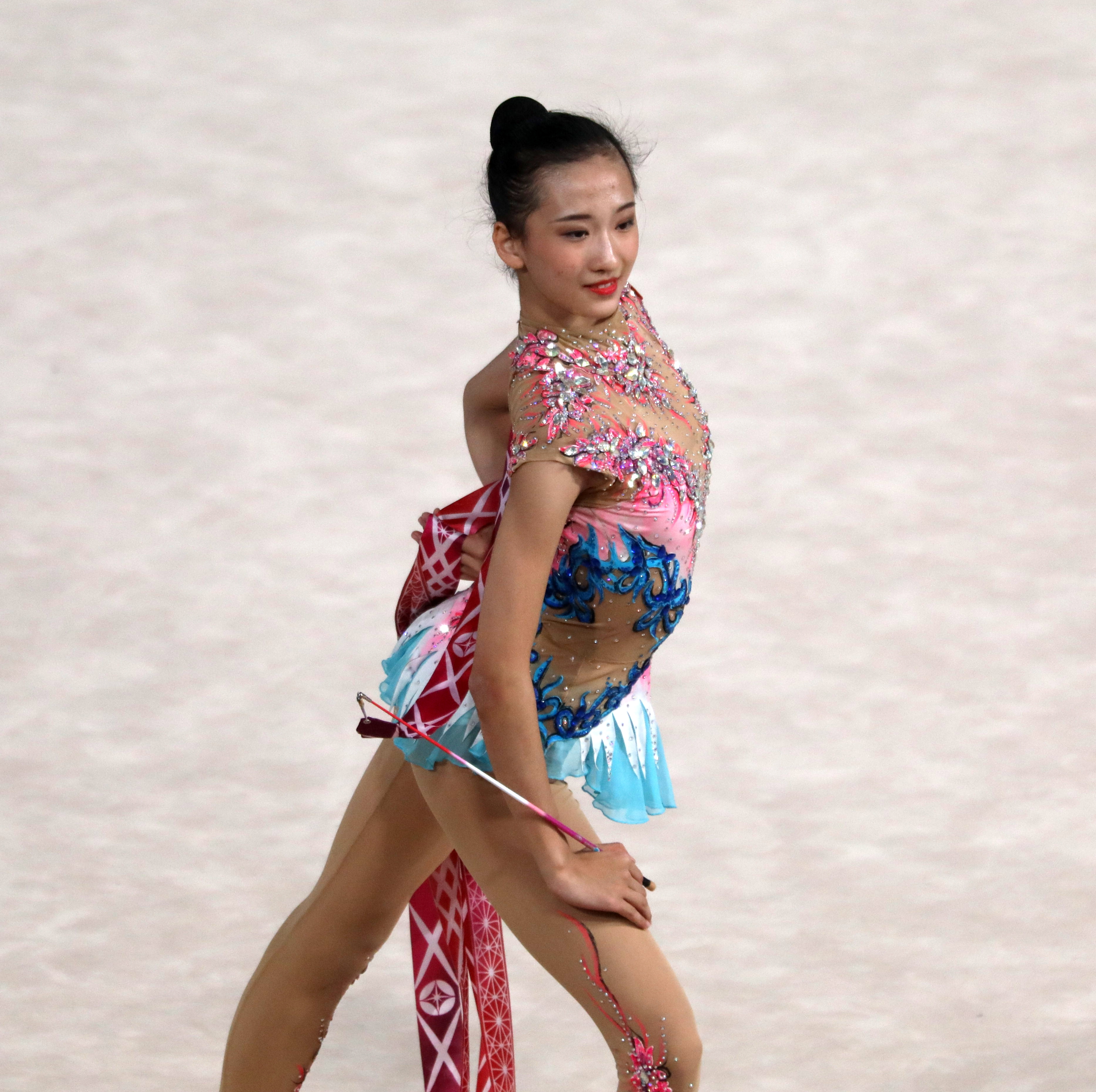
- Wang at the 2018 Summer Youth Olympics

Personal information
- Nickname: Lulu
- Born: 18 June 2003 (age 23) Guangdong, China

Gymnastics career
- Discipline: Rhythmic gymnastics
- Country represented: China; (2018 - present)
- Club: Shaanxi Province
- Head coaches: Yan Yunwen, Kang Qi
- Assistant coach: Olena Diachenko
Medal record
Representing China
Rhythmic Gymnastics
Event	1st	2nd	3rd
FIG World Cup	2	0	1
Asian Games	0	0	2
Asian Championships	0	3	4
Total	2	3	7
World Championships
Bronze medal – third place	2026 Frankfurt	Team
Asian Games
Bronze medal – third place	2022 Hangzhou	Team
Bronze medal – third place	2026 Aichi-Nagoya	All-Around
Asian Championships
Silver medal – second place	2019 Pattaya	Team
Silver medal – second place	2026 Bishkek	Hoop
Silver medal – second place	2026 Bishkek	Ball
Bronze medal – third place	2023 Manila	Team
Bronze medal – third place	2023 Manila	All-around
Bronze medal – third place	2023 Manila	Hoop
Bronze medal – third place	2026 Bishkek	Team

Wang Zilu (Chinese: 王子露; born 18 June 2003) is a Chinese rhythmic gymnast. She is the 2023 Asian Championships all-around, hoop, and team bronze medalist and a 2022 Asian Games team bronze medalist. She represented China at the 2024 Summer Olympics in Women's rhythmic individual all-around, and finished on 7th place in the All-around Final.

== Career ==
Wang began rhythmic gymnastics at the age of seven, joining the Shaanxi Provincial Gymnastics Team. In 2013, she was selected for training in the national team.

=== Junior ===
In 2016, Wang and Chen Ziyi were tied for gold medal in the junior ribbon final at the 2016 National Championships.

In May 2018, Wang won the bronze medal in the junior hoop event at the 2018 Asian Championships in Kuala Lumpur, Malaysia. Wang was selected to represent China at the 2018 Summer Youth Olympics in Buenos Aires. She finished 16th in the qualification round and did not advance to the final. She also finished fifth in the mixed multi-discipline team event.

=== Senior ===
Wang became age-eligible for senior competitions in 2019. She competed at the 2019 Asian Championships in Pattaya, where she won silver in the team event alongside Shang Rong, Zhao Yating, and Liu Jiahui.

==== 2021 ====
She was selected to compete at the 2021 World Championships in Kitakyushu, where she ended 28th in the all-around during the qualification round.

==== 2023 ====
In 2023, Wang started the season at the World Cup in Athens, ending 26th in the all-around. She then finished seventh in the all-around at the Sofia World Cup, where she also placed fourth in the clubs final and eighth in the ribbon final. Then in World Cup Tashkent, she placed eleventh in the all-around, fifth in the hoop final, and sixth in the ball final. She finished 22nd in the all-around at the Baku World Cup.

Wang competed at the 2023 Asian Championships in Manila, winning bronze in the all-around and with the Chinese team. She also won a bronze medal in the hoop final. In the last World Cup stage in Milan, she took 24th place in the all-around. Wang the competed at the 2023 World Championships and qualified for the all-around final where she finished tenth. This was the best all-around placement for a Chinese gymnast at the Rhythmic Gymnastics World Championships since Deng Senyue finished fifth in 2014. She also qualified for the ribbon final and placed fifth, the best World Championships result ever for a Chinese gymnast with ribbon. In October she competed at the 2022 Asian Games, which were postponed to 2023 due to the COVID-19 pandemic. She took 5th place in individual all-around final and won bronze medal in team competition.

==== 2024 ====
Wang began the 2024 season at the Athens World Cup, placing 21st in the all-around. In the event finals, she won gold with clubs, becoming the first Chinese individual rhythmic gymnast to win a gold medal on the FIG World Cup series. At the 2024 Asian Championships, she finished fourth in the all-around, hoop, and clubs, and sixth with the ball.

Wang qualified for the 2024 Summer Olympics after France's host spot was reallocated. She competed at the Milan World Cup in June and took 11th place in the all-around. She also won a gold medal in the hoop final. She proceeded to reach the individual all-around final of the 2024 Olympic Games in Paris. She finished on 7th place.

==== 2025 ====
In February 2025, months after her Olympic debut, Wang was diagnosed with asthma. Doctors advised her to retire, but she chose to continue, determined not to end her career during its peak. With support from her coaching team and medical staff, she resumed training after nearly two months of rest. Though her condition had only recovered to about 50–60%, she returned to competition within weeks, relying on medication to manage her symptoms. On May 16-18, she competed at the 2025 Asian Championships in Singapore. Due to major mistakes, she finished the all-around competition in 7th place. She only qualified for the clubs final, where she was 4th. In June, she won gold medal in all-around at Chinese National Championships, despite a mistake in hoop routine. On July 18-20, she competed at World Cup Milan and took 25th place in all-around, due to mistakes in three out of four routines. She qualified to clubs final, winning bronze medal behind Stiliana Nikolova and Sofia Raffaeli.

In August, she represented China at the 2025 World Championships in Rio de Janeiro, Brazil. In qualification, she made mistakes in ball and ribbon, and therefore finished 22nd in all-around. She failed to qualify to the individual all-around final, but qualified to two apparatus finals - she was 7th in clubs and 8th in hoop. Next month, she won gold medal in all-around at Chinese National championships. In November, she competed at the 15th National Games held in Guangdong, where she won gold in all-around in front of Wang Qi.

==== 2026 ====
Wang started the competition season at the Sofia World Cup and took 24th place in the all-around. She qualified to the clubs final, finishing in 6th place. In April, she competed at Tashkent World Cup, taking 17th place in the all-around. In early May, she won silver medal in all-around at Chinese National Championships. In apparatus finals, she won three gold and one silver medal (in ball). On May 23-26, she competed at the 2026 Asian Championships in Bishkek, Kyrgyzstan, and won the team bronze medal alongside Wang Qi and the senior group. Individually, she placed 5th in the all-around final.

On June 19-21, Wang competed at Beijing World Challenge Cup, and took 4th place in all-around. She withdrew from the apparatus finals due to injury. In August, she represented China at the 2026 World Championships in Frankfurt, Germany. Together with Wang Qi and senior group she won historic bronze medal in team competition. She ended on 15th place in the all-around final. She qualified to ball final, finishing 7th.

In October, she competed at the 2026 Asian Games and won bronze medal in the all-around final behind Takhmina Ikromova and Wang Qi. On October 24, she won gold medal in all-around at Chinese National championships in Tongchuan.

== Personal life ==
In 2019, Wang was named an Elite Athlete of National Class by the General Administration of Sport. She is studying physical education at Beijing Sport University.

== Achievements ==
- First Chinese rhythmic gymnast to win a gold medal in an individual apparatus final at the FIG World Cup series.
- Highest placement by a Chinese gymnast in a Rhythmic Gymnastics World Championships ribbon final (5th, 2023)
- First Chinese athlete to qualify for the Olympics rhythmic gymnastics individual all-around final

== Competitive history ==
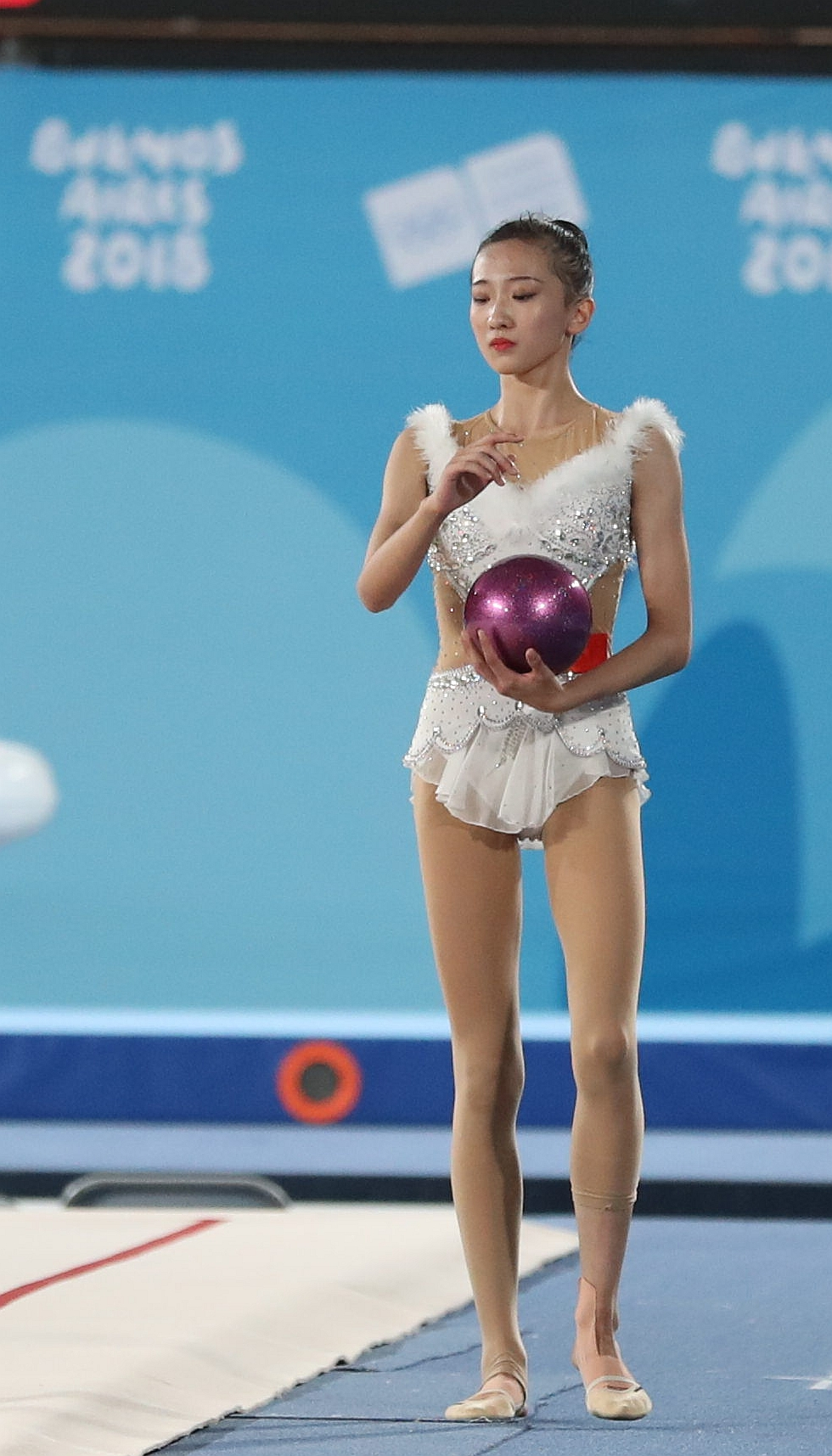
Wang at the 2018 Summer Youth Olympics

Year	Event	Team	AA	HP	BA	CL	RB
Junior
2018
2018	Youth Olympic Games		16				
Senior
2019
2019	Asian Championships	2nd place, silver medalist(s)					
2021
2021	World Championships		28	35	34	19	32
2023	Athens World Cup		26				
2023	Sofia World Cup		7		4	8	
2023	Tashkent World Cup		11	5	6		
2023	Baku World Cup		22				
2023	Asian Championships	3rd place, bronze medalist(s)	3rd place, bronze medalist(s)	3rd place, bronze medalist(s)	5	7	4
2023	Milan World Cup		24				
2023	Asian Games	3rd place, bronze medalist(s)	5				
2023	World Championships	7	10	16	43	12	5
2024	Athens World Cup		21			1st place, gold medalist(s)	
2024	Asian Championships		4	4	6	4	
2024	Milan World Cup		11	1st place, gold medalist(s)	13	13	17
2024	Olympic Games		7				
2025
2025	Asian Championships		7	13	10	4	11
2025	Milan World Cup		25	18	56	3rd place, bronze medalist(s)	22
2025	World Championships	11	22	8	52	7	45
2026	Sofia World Cup		24	27	25	6	31
2026	Tashkent World Cup		17	13	15	21	34
2026	Asian Championships		5	2nd place, silver medalist(s)	2nd place, silver medalist(s)	8	6
2026	World Championships	3rd place, bronze medalist(s)	15	9	7	12	28
2026	Asian Games		3rd place, bronze medalist(s)				

== Routine music information ==
Year	Apparatus	Music Title
2026	Hoop	Final Act by Power-Haus, Ros Stephen
2026	Ball	Missiva d'amore by arisa
2026	Clubs	Sleep Paralysis by Ros Stephen & Nick Tzios
2026	Ribbon	浮光 by Zhou Shen
2025	Hoop	Final Act by Power-Haus, Ros Stephen-哀
2025	Ball	山丹丹开花红艳艳-陕西传统民歌-喜
2025	Clubs	Sleep Paralysis by Ros Stephen & Nick Tzios-怒
2025	Ribbon	La Cumparsita (Questo Tango) by Milva-乐
2024	Hoop	"Homicidal Dependence" by Jardines May
2024	Ball	"Mind Demons" by Audiomachine
2024	Clubs	秦王破阵乐-中国唐朝名曲
2024	Ribbon	醉太平 by Seven Kwan
2023	Hoop	"So Say We All" by Audiomachine
2023	Ball	Nagashi by Jigoku Shoujo
2023	Clubs	To Dwell on Dreams by Audiomachine
2023	Ribbon	醉太平 by Seven Kwan
2020/2021/2022	Hoop	"Despair" / "Escape from Slavery" by Hans Zimmer and PP Music/九州同-关大洲-2022
2020/2021/2022	Ball	四季歌 by Beijing Livetion Orchestra
2020/2021/2022	Clubs	"Tetsujin" by Juno Reactor, Don Davis
2020/2021/2022	Ribbon	"Romani Holiday (Antonius Remix)" by Hans Zimmer
