= Sun Dan (gymnast) =

Chinese rhythmic gymnast

- Born: September 4, 1986 (age 40) Dalian, Liaoning
- Height: 175 cm (5 ft 9 in)

Gymnastics career
- Discipline: Rhythmic gymnastics
- Country represented: China
- Club: Beijing Sports University
- Head coach: Yangfei Xia
- Choreographer: Yangfei Xia
Medal record
Olympic Games
Silver medal – second place	2008 Beijing	Group All-Around
Asian Games
Gold medal – first place	2002 Busan	Team
Asian Championships
Gold medal – first place	2004 Yangzhou	All-Around
Gold medal – first place	2004 Yangzhou	Team
Gold medal – first place	2004 Yangzhou	Clubs
Silver medal – second place	2004 Yangzhou	Ball
Bronze medal – third place	2004 Yangzhou	Hoop
Bronze medal – third place	2004 Yangzhou	Ribbon

Sun Dan (Chinese: 孙丹, born September 4, 1986, in Dalian) is a Chinese rhythmic gymnast who competed in both individual and group disciplines. She is currently serving as the head coach for the Chinese national rhythmic gymnastics team.

== Career ==
Sun won team gold meal alongside Zhang Shuo, Zhong Ling and Zhu Minhong at the 2002 Asian Games in Busan, South Korea. She won six medals at the 2004 Asian Rhythmic Gymnastics Championships in Yangzhou, China, three of them gold (team, all-around, clubs), one silver (ball) and two bronze (hoop, ribbon). At the 2005 World Championships in Baku, Azerbaijan, she took 46th place in all-around qaulifications and 13th place in team competition with Yiming Xiao.

In 2005, she switched to group and competed at the 2007 World Championships in Patras, Greece, taking 9th place in group all-around. Sun represented China at the 2008 Summer Olympics and won a silver medal alongside Cai Tongtong, Chou Tao, Lü Yuanyang, Sui Jianshuang and Zhang Shuo in the group all-around competition.

Since July 14, 2021, Sun Dan has been serving as a coach for the Chinese national team, who won gold medal for the Group All-around event at the 2024 Summer Olympics under the coaching of her and fellow Russian gymnast Anastasia Bliznyuk.
